= Benoîte Crevoisier =

Swiss writer (1938–2024)

- Born: 14 March 1938; Lajoux, Jura, Switzerland
- Died: 20 August 2024 (aged 86); Saignelégier, Jura, Switzerland
- Occupation: Writer

Benoîte Crevoisier (14 March 1938 – 20 August 2024) was a Swiss writer.

== Biography ==
Born in Lajoux on 14 March 1938, Crevoisier grew up in Canton of Bern. She was the tenth-born of twelve children. Her parents, Arnold and Marie, were Catholics. Her father was a schoolteacher. After her schooling in Lajoux and Porrentruy, she attended a teaching institute in Delémont and subsequently taught in Châtelat and Lajoux from 1958 to 1991. She then moved to France, where she lived for seven years before returning to Switzerland and living in Les Breuleux. The mother of three children, she was one of the first women to be divorced in Lajoux.

Crevoisier was known for campaigning against a military parade ground in Franches-Montagnes District from the late 1950s to the late 1970s. She recounted these years in her autobiography, Le bras de fer, published in 2019.

Crevoisier died in Saignelégier on 20 August 2024, at the age of 86.

== Publications ==
- Poignée d’escarbilles (1992)
- Le Miroir aux alouettes (1994)
- Avec un grain de sel (2007)
- Mesdemoiselles (2011)
- Le bras de fer : regard d'une militante sur l'affaire de la place d'armes des Franches-Montagnes (2019)
