= Montfavergier =

- Former municipality
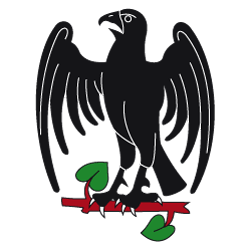
- Coat of arms
- Location of Montfavergier
- Location within Switzerland Location within Canton of Jura
- Coordinates: 47°19′N 07°05′E
- Country: Switzerland
- Canton: Jura
- District: Franches-Montagnes

Area
  - Total: 3.45 km^{2} (1.33 sq mi)
- Elevation: 801 m (2,628 ft)

Population (2003)
  - Total: 34
  - Density: 9.9/km^{2} (26/sq mi)
- Time zone: UTC+01:00 (CET)
  - Summer (DST): UTC+02:00 (CEST)
- Postal code: 2874
- SFOS number: 520
- ISO 3166 code: CH-JU
- Surrounded by: Soubey, Epiquerez, Saint-Brais, Montfaucon, Les Enfers
- Website: SFSO statistics

Montfavergier is a former municipality in the district of Franches-Montagnes in the canton of Jura in Switzerland. On 1 January 2009 the former municipality of Montfavergier merged into Montfaucon.
