= Les Genevez =

- Municipality
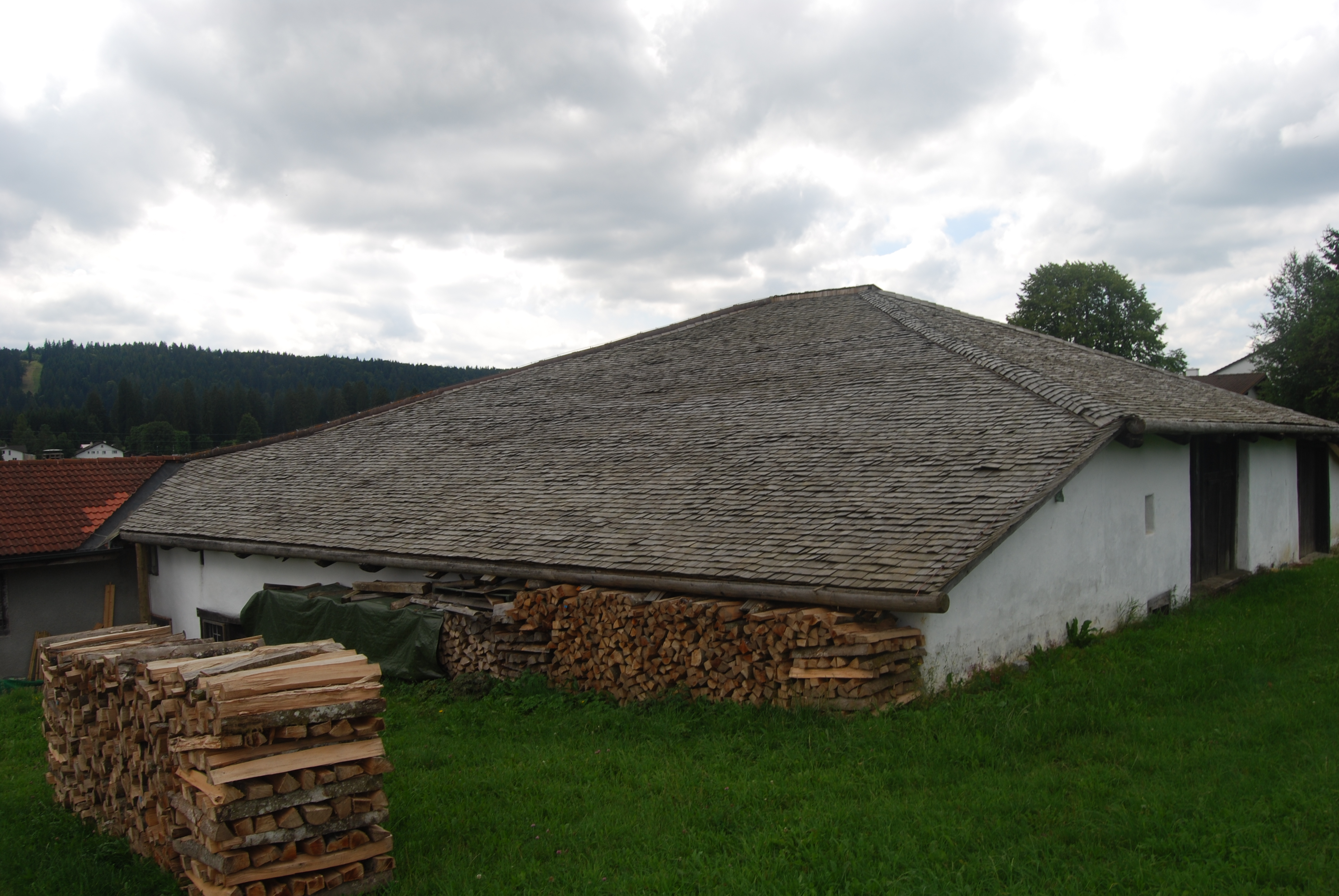
- Rural Jura Region Museum in Les Genevez

- Flag Coat of arms
- Location of Les Genevez
- Location within Switzerland Location within Canton of Jura
- Coordinates: 47°15′N 07°08′E
- Country: Switzerland
- Canton: Jura
- District: Franches-Montagnes

Government
  - Executive: Conseil communal with 7 members
  - Mayor: Maire; Anael Lovis (as of 2026)

Area
  - Total: 13.64 km^{2} (5.27 sq mi)
- Elevation: 1,035 m (3,396 ft)

Population (2020)
  - Total: 5,016
  - Density: 367.7/km^{2} (952.4/sq mi)
- Time zone: UTC+01:00 (CET)
  - Summer (DST): UTC+02:00 (CEST)
- Postal code: 2714
- SFOS number: 6748
- ISO 3166 code: CH-JU
- Surrounded by: Montfaucon, Lajoux, Saicourt(BE), Tramelan(BE)
- Website: lesgenevez.ch

Les Genevez is a municipality in the district of Franches-Montagnes in the canton of Jura in Switzerland.

== History ==
Les Genevez is first mentioned in 1381 as Les Geneveys.

== Geography ==
Aerial view (1953)

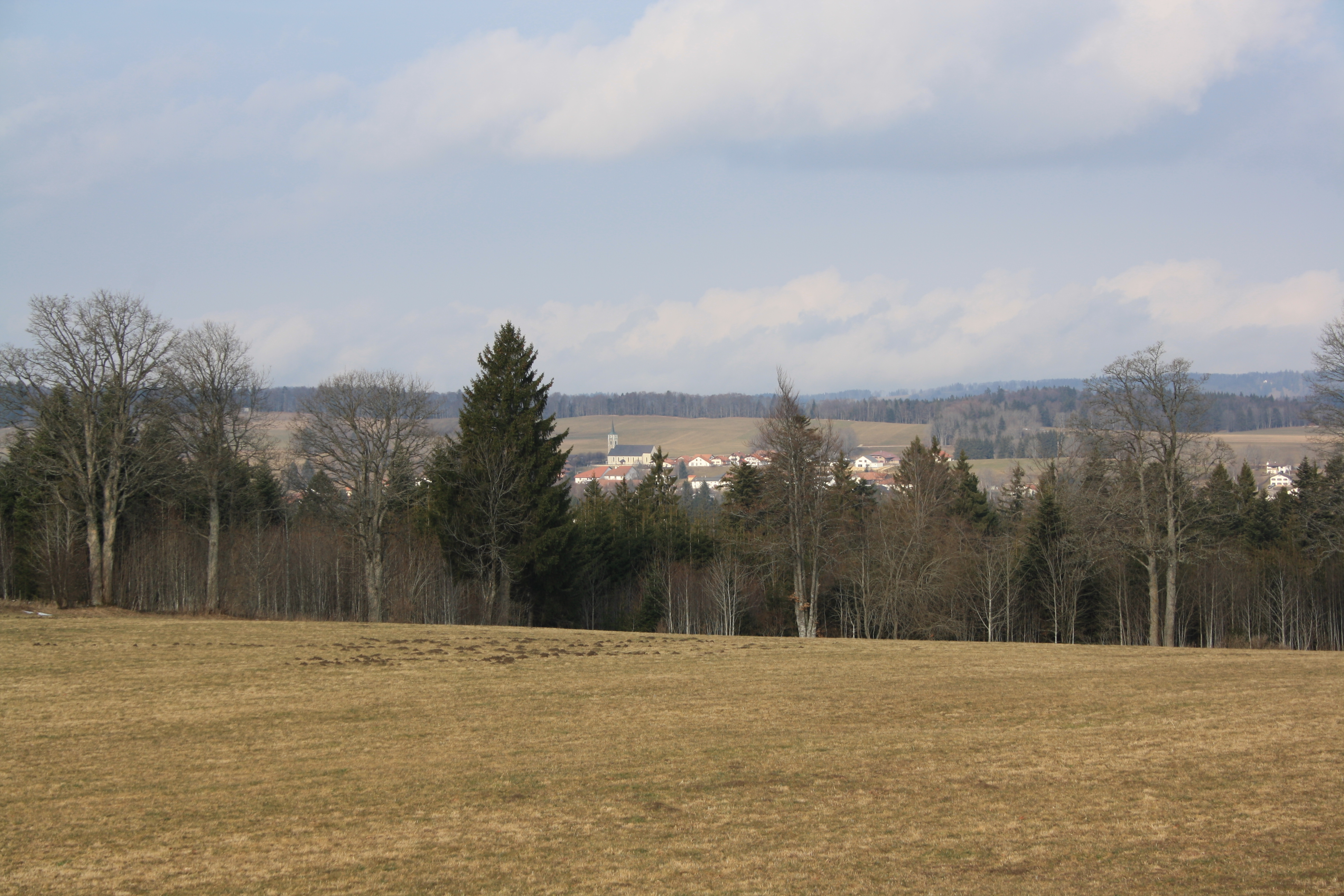
Les Genevez and surrounding countryside

Les Genevez has an area of 13.63 km^{2} (5.26 sq mi). Of this area, 7.32 km^{2} (2.83 mi^{2}) or 53.8% is used for agricultural purposes, while 5.64 km^{2} (2.18 mi^{2}) or 41.4% is forested. Of the rest of the land, 0.49 km^{2} (0.19 mi^{2}) or 3.6% is settled (buildings or roads), 0.01 km^{2} (2.5 acres) or 0.1% is either rivers or lakes and 0.14 km^{2} (35 acres) or 1.0% is unproductive land.

Of the built up area, housing and buildings made up 2.1% and transportation infrastructure made up 1.2%. Out of the forested land, 36.3% of the total land area is heavily forested and 5.1% is covered with orchards or small clusters of trees. Of the agricultural land, 12.6% is used for growing crops and 24.8% is pastures and 16.3% is used for alpine pastures. All the water in the municipality is flowing water.

The municipality is located in the Franches-Montagnes district. It consists of the village of Les Genevez and a number of hamlets of including Le Prédame and Les Vacheries.

The municipalities of Le Bémont, Les Bois, Les Breuleux, La Chaux-des-Breuleux, Les Enfers, Les Genevez (JU), Lajoux, Montfaucon, Muriaux, Le Noirmont, Saignelégier, Saint-Brais and Soubey are considering a merger on at a date in the future into the new municipality of Franches-Montagnes.

== Coat of arms ==
The blazon of the municipal coat of arms is Or, a Rooster's head erased Gules.

== Demographics ==
Les Genevez has a population (as of December 2020) of 516. As of 2008, 7.4% of the population are resident foreign nationals. Over the last 10 years (2000–2010) the population has changed at a rate of 1.9%. Migration accounted for -1.4%, while births and deaths accounted for 2.3%.

Most of the population (as of 2000) speaks French (488 or 94.6%) as their first language, German is the second most common (24 or 4.7%) and Italian is the third (2 or 0.4%).

As of 2008, the population was 52.0% male and 48.0% female. The population was made up of 256 Swiss men (47.9% of the population) and 22 (4.1%) non-Swiss men. There were 230 Swiss women (43.0%) and 27 (5.0%) non-Swiss women. Of the population in the municipality, 278 or about 53.9% were born in Les Genevez and lived there in 2000. There were 89 or 17.2% who were born in the same canton, while 99 or 19.2% were born somewhere else in Switzerland, and 31 or 6.0% were born outside of Switzerland.

As of 2000, children and teenagers (0–19 years old) make up 26.6% of the population, while adults (20–64 years old) make up 56.8% and seniors (over 64 years old) make up 16.7%.

As of 2000, there were 227 people who were single and never married in the municipality. There were 246 married individuals, 32 widows or widowers and 11 individuals who are divorced.

As of 2000, there were 199 private households in the municipality, and an average of 2.5 persons per household. There were 56 households that consist of only one person and 22 households with five or more people. In 2000, a total of 199 apartments (83.6% of the total) were permanently occupied, while 24 apartments (10.1%) were seasonally occupied and 15 apartments (6.3%) were empty. The vacancy rate for the municipality, in 2010, was 3.16%.

The historical population is given in the following chart:

== Heritage sites of national significance ==
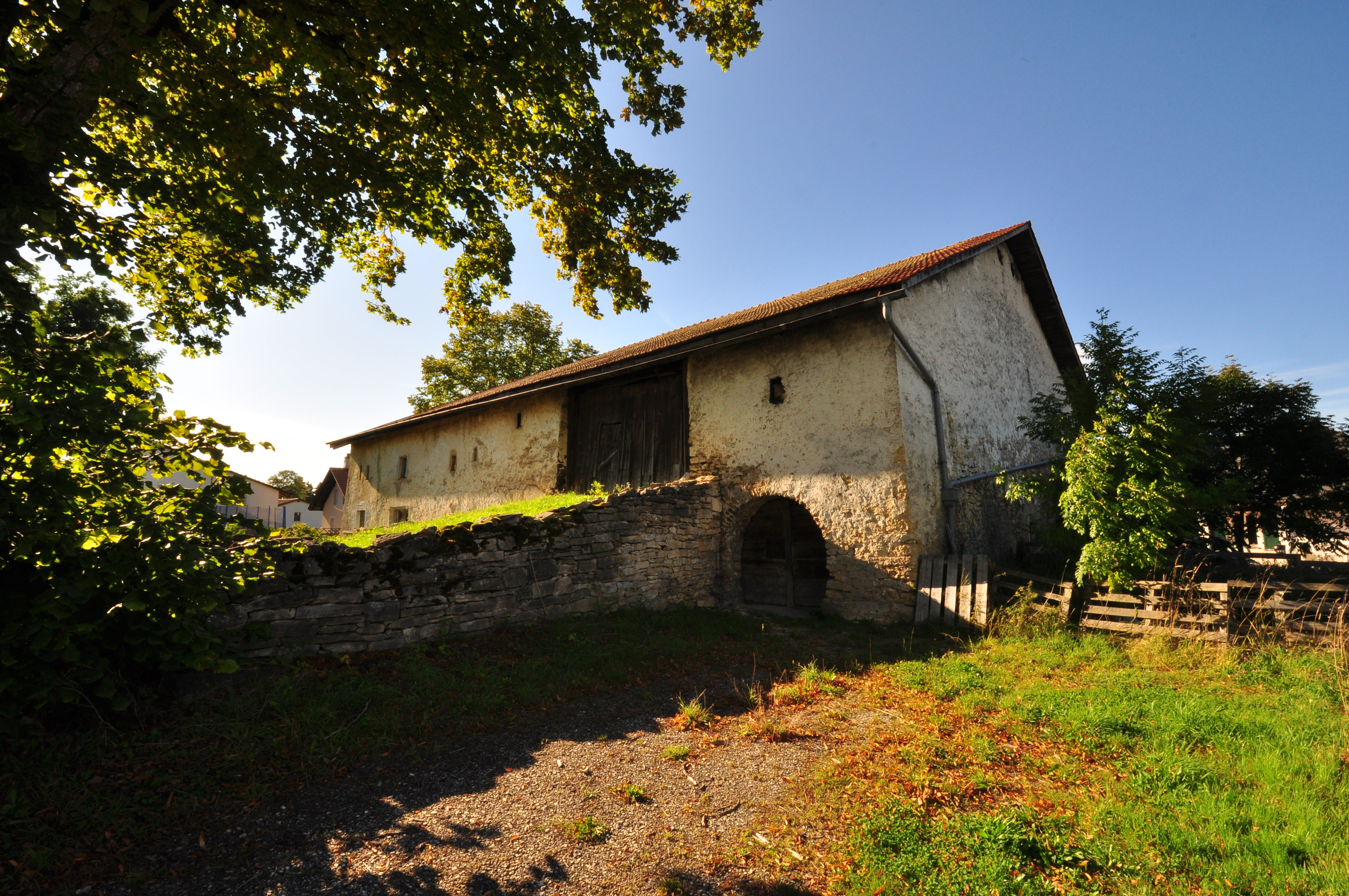
Farm house number 35

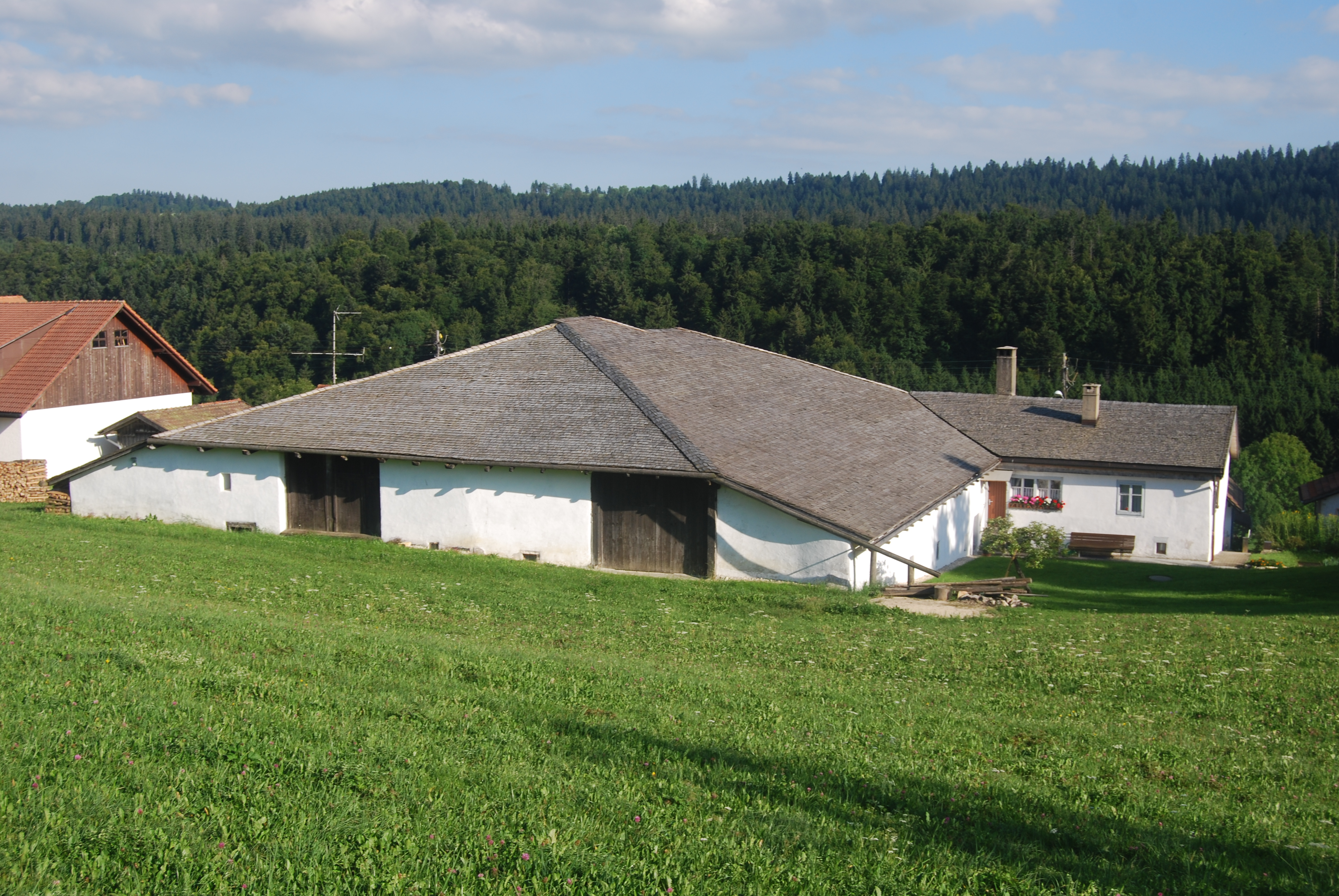
Rural Jurassien (Rural Jura) Museum

The farm house number 35 and the Rural Jurassien Museum are listed as Swiss heritage site of national significance.

== Politics ==
In the 2007 federal election the most popular party was the SPS which received 31.02% of the vote. The next three most popular parties were the SVP (20.07%), the FDP (18.61%) and the CSP (16.79%). In the federal election, a total of 137 votes were cast, and the voter turnout was 34.1%.

== Economy ==
As of 2010, Les Genevez had an unemployment rate of 4.3%. As of 2008, there were 43 people employed in the primary economic sector and about 20 businesses involved in this sector. 259 people were employed in the secondary sector and there were 10 businesses in this sector. 52 people were employed in the tertiary sector, with 12 businesses in this sector. There were 265 residents of the municipality who were employed in some capacity, of which females made up 43.0% of the workforce.

In 2008 the total number of full-time equivalent jobs was 306. The number of jobs in the primary sector was 31, all of which were in agriculture. The number of jobs in the secondary sector was 235 of which 224 or (95.3%) were in manufacturing and 12 (5.1%) were in construction. The number of jobs in the tertiary sector was 40. In the tertiary sector; 9 or 22.5% were in wholesale or retail sales or the repair of motor vehicles, 2 or 5.0% were in the movement and storage of goods, 4 or 10.0% were in a hotel or restaurant, 3 or 7.5% were the insurance or financial industry, 7 or 17.5% were technical professionals or scientists, and 14 or 35.0% were in health care.

In 2000, there were 166 workers who commuted into the municipality and 131 workers who commuted away. The municipality is a net importer of workers, with about 1.3 workers entering the municipality for every one leaving. About 25.9% of the workforce coming into Les Genevez are coming from outside Switzerland. Of the working population, 3.8% used public transportation to get to work, and 61.9% used a private car.

== Religion ==
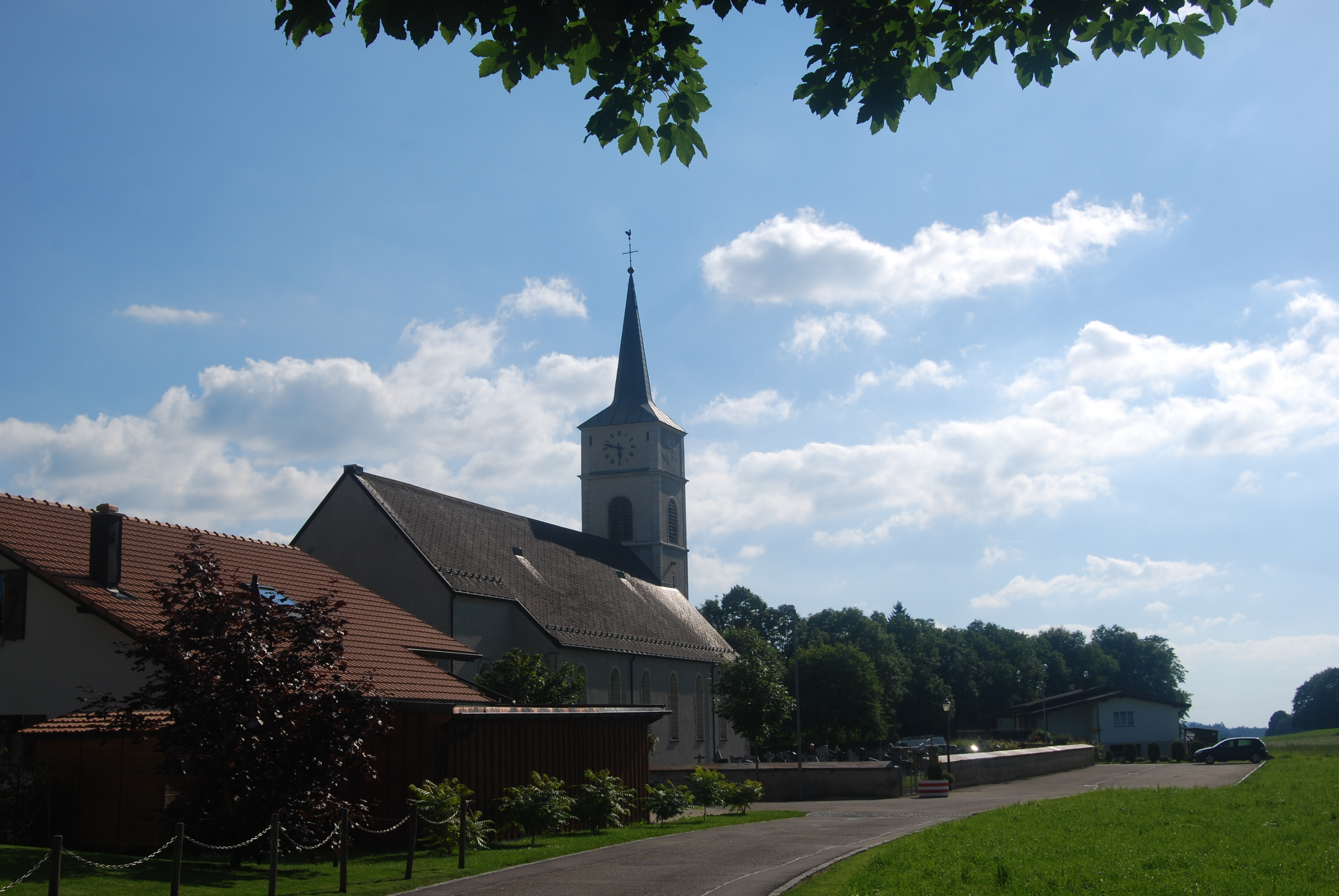
Les Genevez church

From the 2000 census, 391 or 75.8% were Roman Catholic, while 53 or 10.3% belonged to the Swiss Reformed Church. Of the rest of the population, there was 1 member of an Orthodox church, and there were 35 individuals (or about 6.78% of the population) who belonged to another Christian church. 34 (or about 6.59% of the population) belonged to no church, are agnostic or atheist, and 19 individuals (or about 3.68% of the population) did not answer the question.

== Education ==
In Les Genevez about 189 or (36.6%) of the population have completed non-mandatory upper secondary education, and 37 or (7.2%) have completed additional higher education (either university or a Fachhochschule). Of the 37 who completed tertiary schooling, 83.8% were Swiss men, 13.5% were Swiss women.

The Canton of Jura school system provides two year of non-obligatory Kindergarten, followed by six years of Primary school. This is followed by three years of obligatory lower Secondary school where the students are separated according to ability and aptitude. Following the lower Secondary students may attend a three or four year optional upper Secondary school followed by some form of Tertiary school or they may enter an apprenticeship.

During the 2009–10 school year, there were a total of 45 students attending 4 classes in Les Genevez. There was one kindergarten class with a total of 7 students in the municipality. The municipality had 3 primary classes and 38 students. There are only nine Secondary schools in the canton, so all the students from Les Genevez attend their secondary school in another municipality.

As of 2000, there were 4 students in Les Genevez who came from another municipality, while 31 residents attended schools outside the municipality.
