= La Chaux-des-Breuleux =

- Former municipality
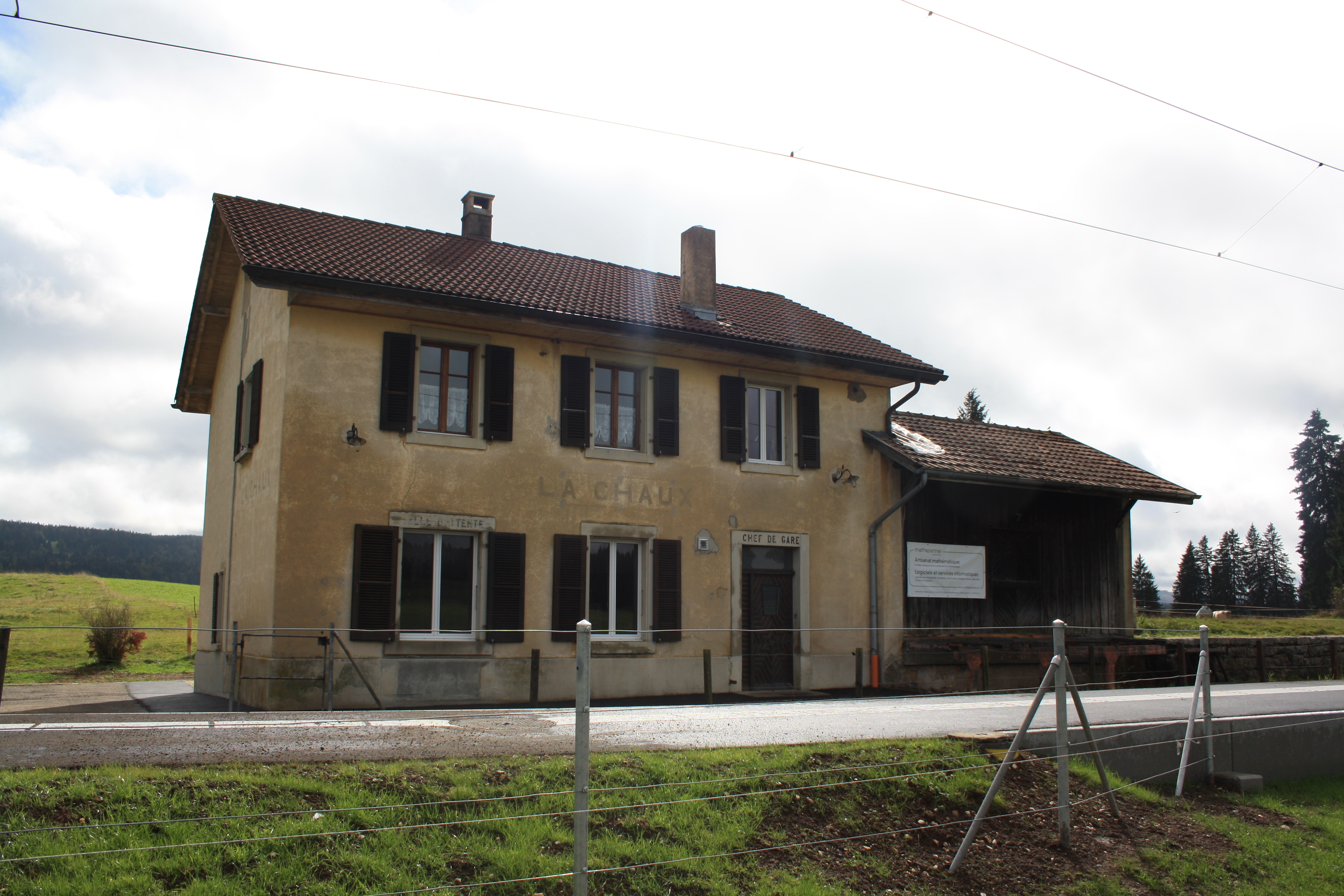
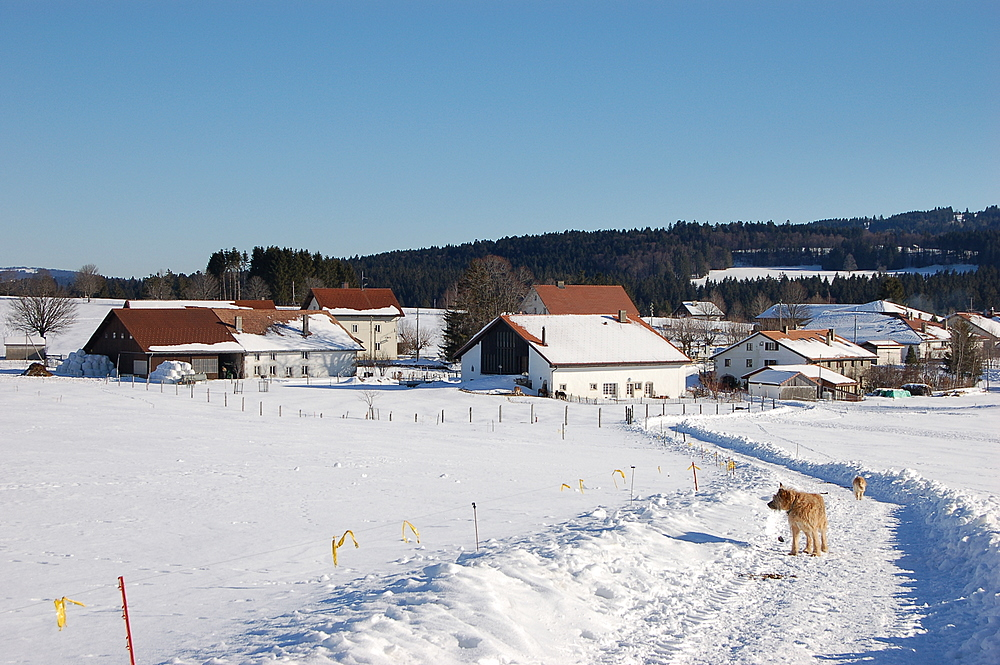
- Old La Chaux-des-Breuleux railway station La-Chaux-des-Breuleux village

- Coat of arms
- Location of La Chaux-des-Breuleux
- Location within Switzerland Location within Canton of Jura
- Coordinates: 47°13′N 07°02′E
- Country: Switzerland
- Canton: Jura
- District: Franches-Montagnes

Government
  - Mayor: Maire

Area
  - Total: 4.12 km^{2} (1.59 sq mi)
- Elevation: 1,016 m (3,333 ft)

Population (2003)
  - Total: 96
  - Density: 23/km^{2} (60/sq mi)
- Time zone: UTC+01:00 (CET)
  - Summer (DST): UTC+02:00 (CEST)
- Postal code: 2345
- SFOS number: 6744
- ISO 3166 code: CH-JU
- Surrounded by: Les Breuleux, Muriaux, Saignelégier, Tramelan(BE), Mont-Tramelan(BE), Courtelary(BE)
- Website: breuleux.ch

La Chaux-des-Breuleux (French pronunciation: [la ʃo de bʁœlø]) is a former municipality in the district of Franches-Montagnes in the canton of Jura in Switzerland. On 1 January 2023 the former municipality of La Chaux-des-Breuleux merged to form the municipality of Les Breuleux.

== History ==
La Chaux-des-Breuleux is first mentioned in 1397 as La Chaux.

== Geography ==
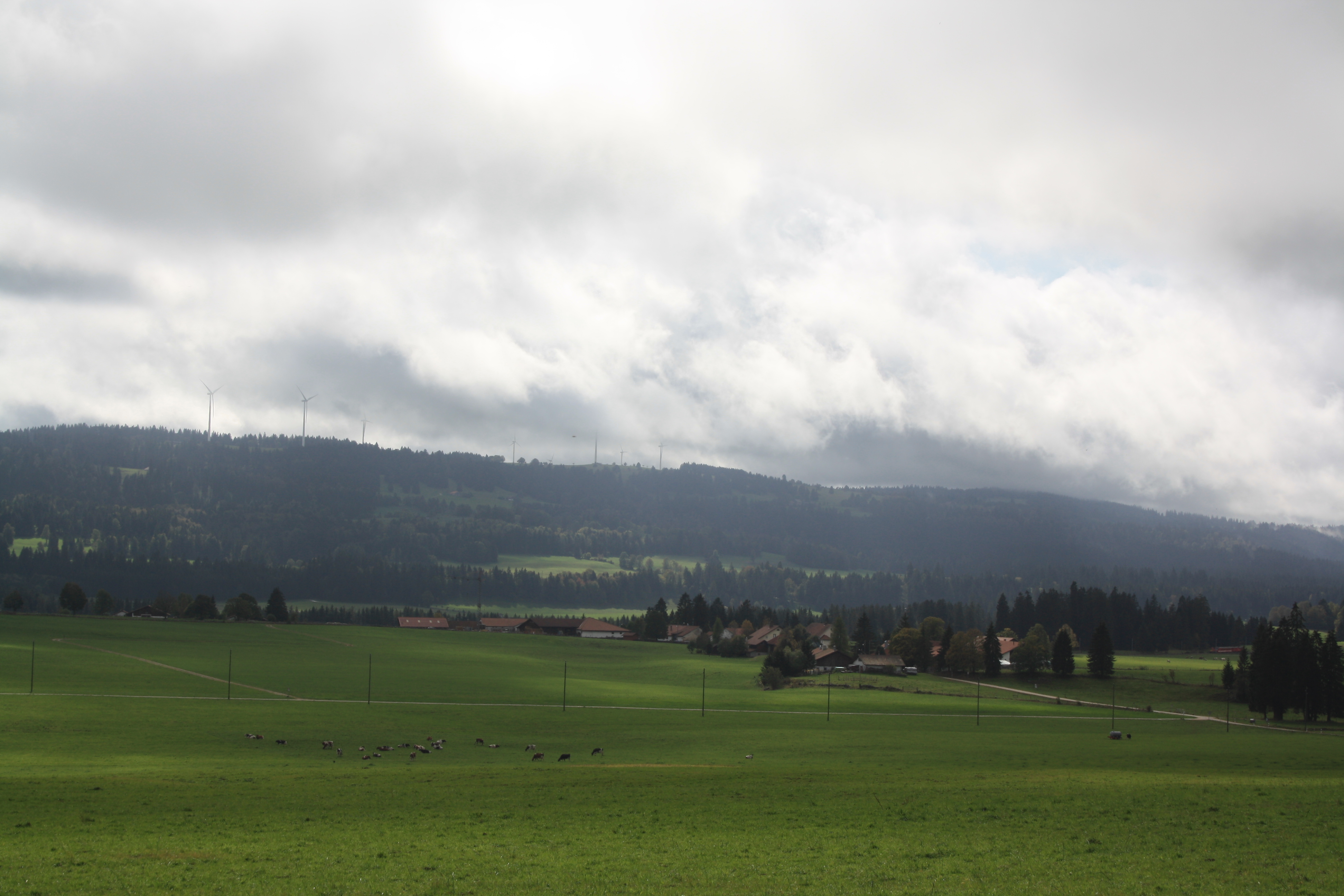
La Chaux-des-Breuleux village

La Chaux-des-Breuleux has an area of 4.05 km^{2} (1.56 sq mi). Of this area, 2.86 km^{2} (1.10 mi^{2}) or 70.6% is used for agricultural purposes, while 0.94 km^{2} (0.36 mi^{2}) or 23.2% is forested. Of the rest of the land, 0.14 km^{2} (35 acres) or 3.5% is settled (buildings or roads), 0.01 km^{2} (2.5 acres) or 0.2% is either rivers or lakes and 0.12 km^{2} (30 acres) or 3.0% is unproductive land.

Of the built up area, housing and buildings made up 1.7% and transportation infrastructure made up 1.2%. Out of the forested land, 18.3% of the total land area is heavily forested and 4.9% is covered with orchards or small clusters of trees. Of the agricultural land, 10.1% is used for growing crops and 33.1% is pastures and 27.4% is used for alpine pastures. All the water in the municipality is in lakes.

The municipality is located in the Franches-Montagnes district, at an elevation of 1,016 m (3,333 ft) on the border between the Canton of Jura and Bern.

The municipalities of Le Bémont, Les Bois, Les Breuleux, La Chaux-des-Breuleux, Les Enfers, Les Genevez, Lajoux, Montfaucon, Muriaux, Le Noirmont, Saignelégier, Saint-Brais and Soubey are considering a merger on at a date in the future into the new municipality of Franches-Montagnes.

== Coat of arms ==
The blazon of the municipal coat of arms is Or, on Coupeaux Gules a Horse rampant Sable langued of the second.

== Demographics ==
La Chaux-des-Breuleux has a population (as of December 2020) of 96. As of 2008, 9.4% of the population are resident foreign nationals. Over the last 10 years (2000–2010) the population has changed at a rate of -9.9%. Migration accounted for -11%, while births and deaths accounted for 5.5%.

Most of the population (as of 2000) speaks French (84 or 85.7%) as their first language, German is the second most common (12 or 12.2%) and Dutch is the third (1 or 1.0%).

As of 2008, the population was 50.6% male and 49.4% female. The population was made up of 37 Swiss men (45.7% of the population) and 4 (4.9%) non-Swiss men. There were 36 Swiss women (44.4%) and 4 (4.9%) non-Swiss women. Of the population in the municipality, 34 or about 34.7% were born in La Chaux-des-Breuleux and lived there in 2000. There were 21 or 21.4% who were born in the same canton, while 32 or 32.7% were born somewhere else in Switzerland, and 9 or 9.2% were born outside of Switzerland.

As of 2000, children and teenagers (0–19 years old) make up 27.6% of the population, while adults (20–64 years old) make up 65.3% and seniors (over 64 years old) make up 7.1%.

As of 2000, there were 42 people who were single and never married in the municipality. There were 48 married individuals, 3 widows or widowers and 5 individuals who are divorced.

As of 2000, there were 36 private households in the municipality, and an average of 2.6 persons per household. There were 9 households that consist of only one person and 3 households with five or more people. In 2000, a total of 34 apartments (75.6% of the total) were permanently occupied, while 9 apartments (20.0%) were seasonally occupied and 2 apartments (4.4%) were empty.

The historical population is given in the following chart:

== Heritage sites of national significance ==
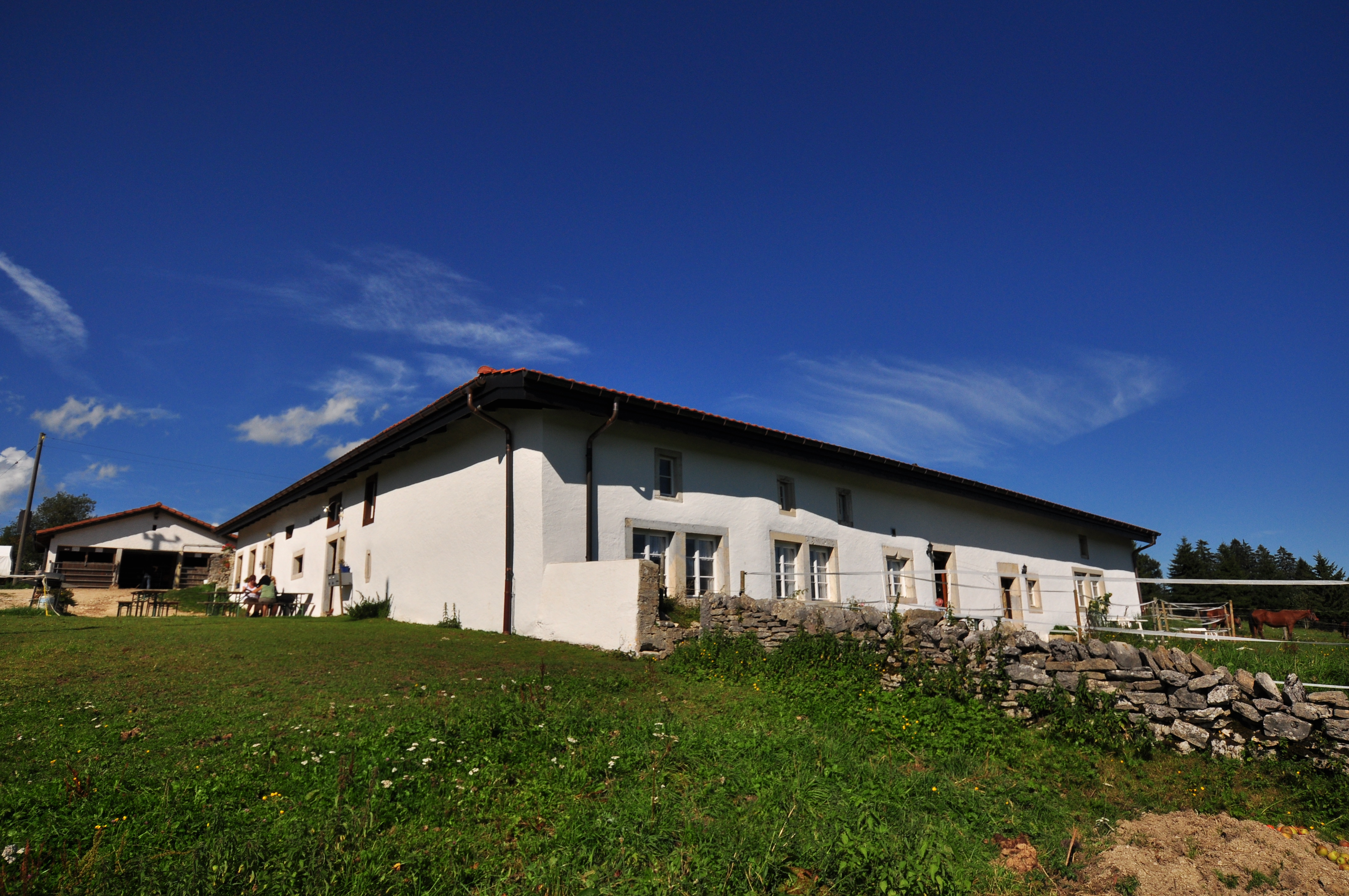
Farm house number 22

The farm house number 22 is listed as Swiss heritage site of national significance. The entire hamlet of La Chaux-des-Breuleux is part of the ISOS.

== Politics ==
In the 2007 federal election the most popular party was the SPS which received 35.71% of the vote. The next three most popular parties were the CSP (23.81%), the CVP (22.62%) and the SVP (9.52%). In the federal election, a total of 43 votes were cast, and the voter turnout was 53.8%.

== Economy ==
As of 2010, La Chaux-des-Breuleux had an unemployment rate of 3%. As of 2008, there were 15 people employed in the primary economic sector and about 6 businesses involved in this sector. 1 person was employed in the secondary sector and there was 1 business in this sector. 25 people were employed in the tertiary sector, with 1 business in this sector. There were 50 residents of the municipality who were employed in some capacity, of which females made up 46.0% of the workforce.

In 2008 the total number of full-time equivalent jobs was 34. The number of jobs in the primary sector was 10, all of which were in agriculture. The number of jobs in the secondary sector was 1, in construction. The number of jobs in the tertiary sector was 23, all in a hotel or restaurant.

In 2000, there were 2 workers who commuted into the municipality and 34 workers who commuted away. The municipality is a net exporter of workers, with about 17.0 workers leaving the municipality for every one entering. Of the working population, 16% used public transportation to get to work, and 48% used a private car.

== Religion ==
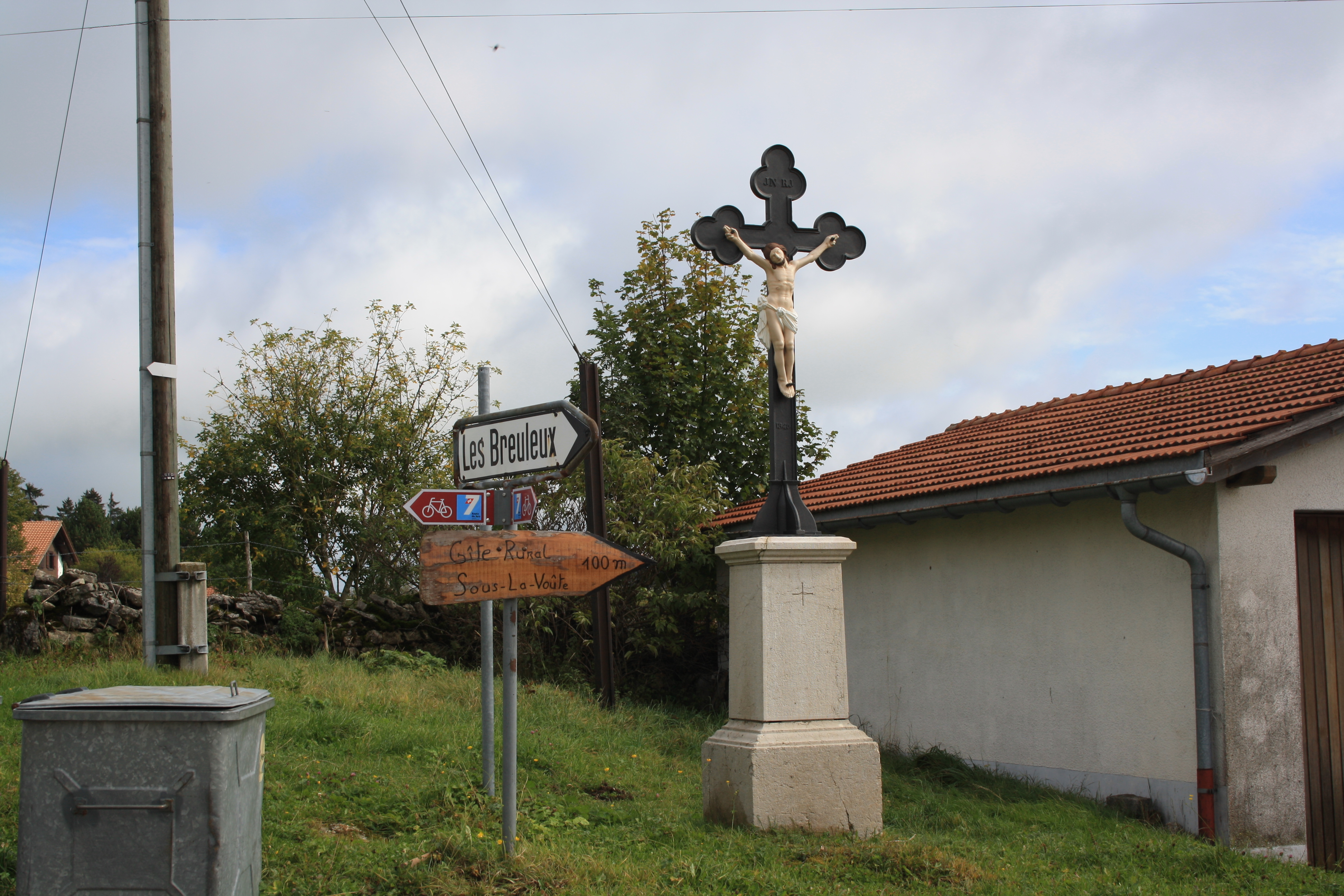
Roadside cross in La Chaux-des-Breuleux

From the 2000 census, 55 or 56.1% were Roman Catholic, while 15 or 15.3% belonged to the Swiss Reformed Church. Of the rest of the population, there were 10 individuals (or about 10.20% of the population) who belonged to another Christian church. There were 4 (or about 4.08% of the population) who were Islamic. There were 1 individual who belonged to another church. 15 (or about 15.31% of the population) belonged to no church, are agnostic or atheist, and 3 individuals (or about 3.06% of the population) did not answer the question.

== Education ==
In La Chaux-des-Breuleux about 27 or (27.6%) of the population have completed non-mandatory upper secondary education, and 17 or (17.3%) have completed additional higher education (either university or a Fachhochschule). Of the 17 who completed tertiary schooling, 58.8% were Swiss men, 35.3% were Swiss women.

The Canton of Jura school system provides two year of non-obligatory Kindergarten, followed by six years of Primary school. This is followed by three years of obligatory lower Secondary school where the students are separated according to ability and aptitude. Following the lower Secondary students may attend a three or four year optional upper Secondary school followed by some form of Tertiary school or they may enter an apprenticeship.

During the 2009–10 school year, there were no students attending school in La Chaux-des-Breuleux.

As of 2000, there were 6 students in La Chaux-des-Breuleux who came from another municipality, while 21 residents attended schools outside the municipality.
