= Le Bémont =

- Municipality
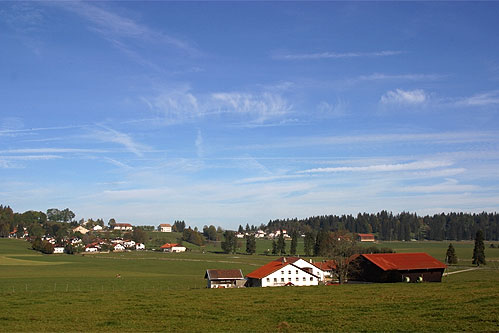
- Le Bémont village

- Coat of arms
- Location of Le Bémont
- Location within Switzerland Location within Canton of Jura
- Coordinates: 47°16′N 07°01′E
- Country: Switzerland
- Canton: Jura
- District: Franches-Montagnes

Government
  - Executive: Conseil communal with 5 members
  - Mayor: Maire; André Tschudi (as of 2026)

Area
  - Total: 11.64 km^{2} (4.49 sq mi)
- Elevation: 982 m (3,222 ft)

Population (2020)
  - Total: 324
  - Density: 27.8/km^{2} (72.1/sq mi)
- Time zone: UTC+01:00 (CET)
  - Summer (DST): UTC+02:00 (CEST)
- Postal code: 2360
- SFOS number: 6741
- ISO 3166 code: CH-JU
- Localities: La Bosse, Les Communances, Les Cufattes, Les Rouges-Terres
- Surrounded by: Saignelégier, Les Pommerats, Les Enfers, Montfaucon, Tramelan(BE)
- Website: http://lebemont.ch/

Le Bémont is a municipality in the district of Franches-Montagnes in the canton of Jura in Switzerland.

== History ==
Le Bémont is first mentioned in 1330 as Le Belmont.

== Geography ==
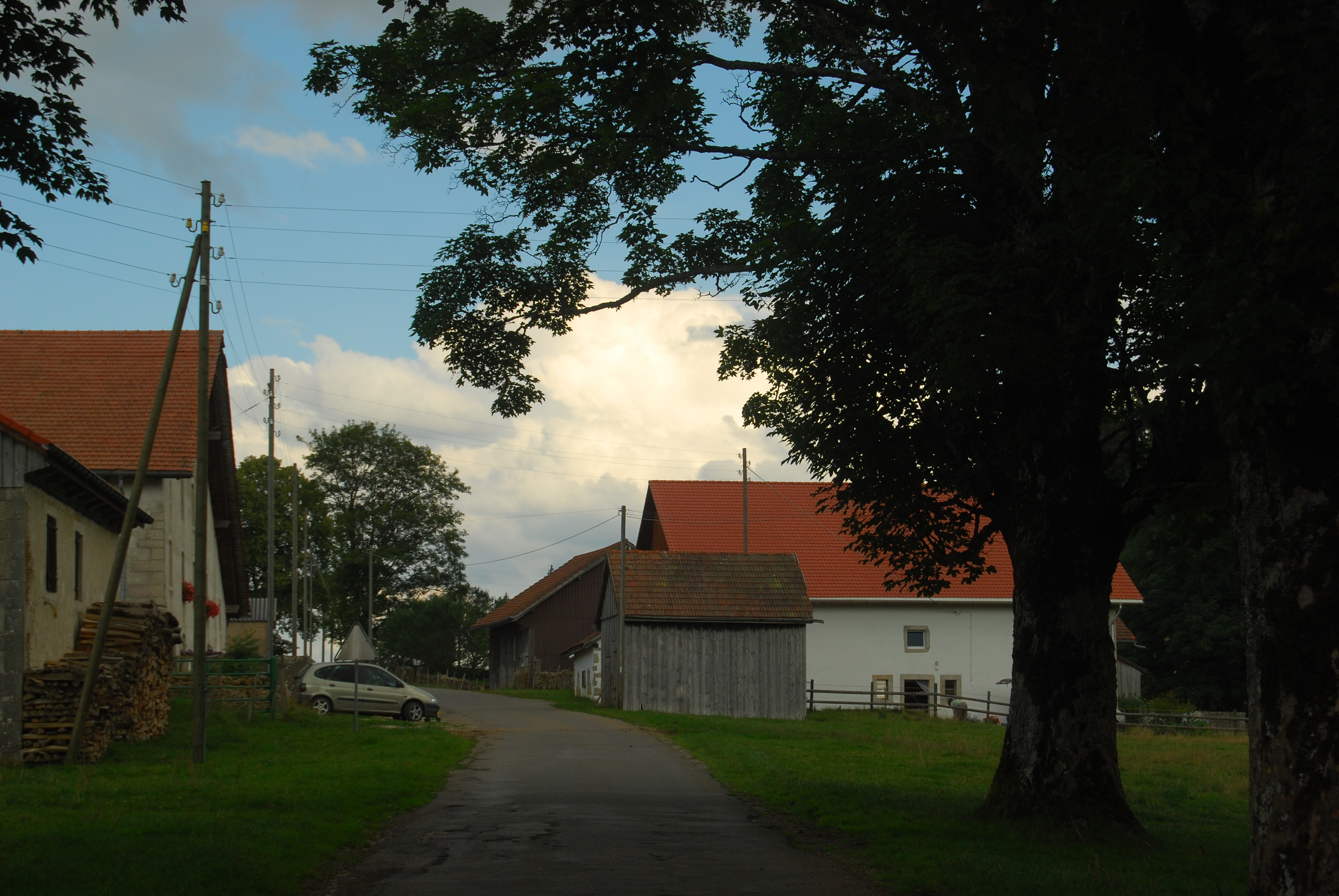
Les Rouges Terres hamlet

Le Bémont has an area of 11.68 km^{2} (4.51 sq mi). Of this area, 7.94 km^{2} (3.07 mi^{2}) or 68.0% is used for agricultural purposes, while 3.04 km^{2} (1.17 mi^{2}) or 26.0% is forested. Of the rest of the land, 0.5 km^{2} (0.19 mi^{2}) or 4.3% is settled (buildings or roads) and 0.14 km^{2} (35 acres) or 1.2% is unproductive land.

Of the built up area, housing and buildings made up 1.9% and transportation infrastructure made up 2.1%. Out of the forested land, 21.6% of the total land area is heavily forested and 4.5% is covered with orchards or small clusters of trees. Of the agricultural land, 12.5% is used for growing crops and 34.0% is pastures and 21.5% is used for alpine pastures.

The municipality is located in the Franches-Montagnes district. It consists of a number of hamlets including La Bosse and Les Rouges-Terres.

The municipalities of Le Bémont, Les Bois, Les Breuleux, La Chaux-des-Breuleux, Les Enfers, Les Genevez, Lajoux, Montfaucon, Muriaux, Le Noirmont, Saignelégier, Saint-Brais and Soubey are considering a merger on at a date in the future into the new municipality of Franches-Montagnes.

== Coat of arms ==
The blazon of the municipal coat of arms is Or a Pine Tree Vert trunked Sable issuant from a Mount of the second between two horses passant Gules and in chief two Mullets of Five of the same.

== Demographics ==
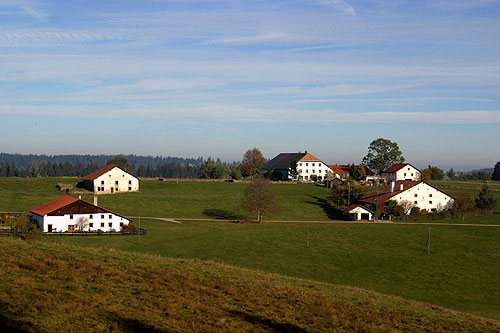
Farm houses in Les Rouges Terres

Le Bémont has a population (as of December 2020) of 324. As of 2008, 2.4% of the population are resident foreign nationals. Over the last 10 years (2000–2010) the population has changed at a rate of -8.2%. Migration accounted for -10.1%, while births and deaths accounted for 4.5%.

Most of the population (as of 2000) speaks French (337 or 97.4%) as their first language, German is the second most common (8 or 2.3%) and Italian is the third (1 or 0.3%).

As of 2008, the population was 52.0% male and 48.0% female. The population was made up of 168 Swiss men (51.4% of the population) and 2 (0.6%) non-Swiss men. There were 154 Swiss women (47.1%) and 3 (0.9%) non-Swiss women. Of the population in the municipality, 158 or about 45.7% were born in Le Bémont and lived there in 2000. There were 112 or 32.4% who were born in the same canton, while 49 or 14.2% were born somewhere else in Switzerland, and 15 or 4.3% were born outside of Switzerland.

As of 2000, children and teenagers (0–19 years old) make up 30.6% of the population, while adults (20–64 years old) make up 57.2% and seniors (over 64 years old) make up 12.1%.

As of 2000, there were 150 people who were single and never married in the municipality. There were 181 married individuals, 8 widows or widowers and 7 individuals who are divorced.

As of 2000, there were 115 private households in the municipality, and an average of 3.0 persons per household. There were 20 households that consist of only one person and 21 households with five or more people. In 2000, a total of 115 apartments (76.7% of the total) were permanently occupied, while 30 apartments (20.0%) were seasonally occupied and 5 apartments (3.3%) were empty.

The historical population is given in the following chart:

== Heritage sites of national significance ==
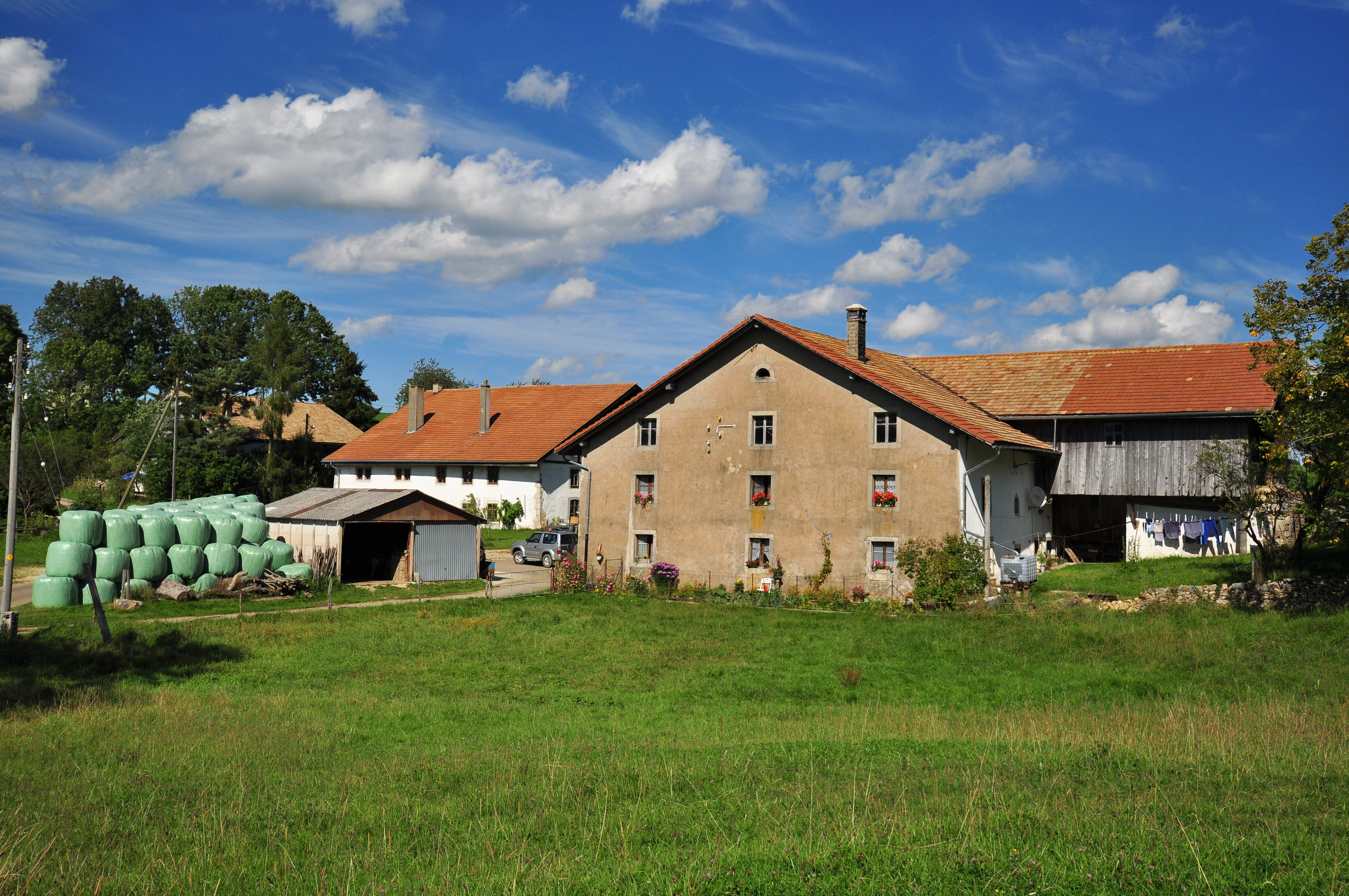
Farm house at La Bosse 38

The farm house at La Bosse 38 is listed as Swiss heritage site of national significance. The entire hamlet of La Bosse is part of the Inventory of Swiss Heritage Sites.

== Politics ==
In the 2007 federal election the most popular party was the CSP which received 32.74% of the vote. The next three most popular parties were the SPS (28.76%), the CVP (21.24%) and the SVP (8.85%). In the federal election, a total of 114 votes were cast, and the voter turnout was 42.2%.

== Economy ==
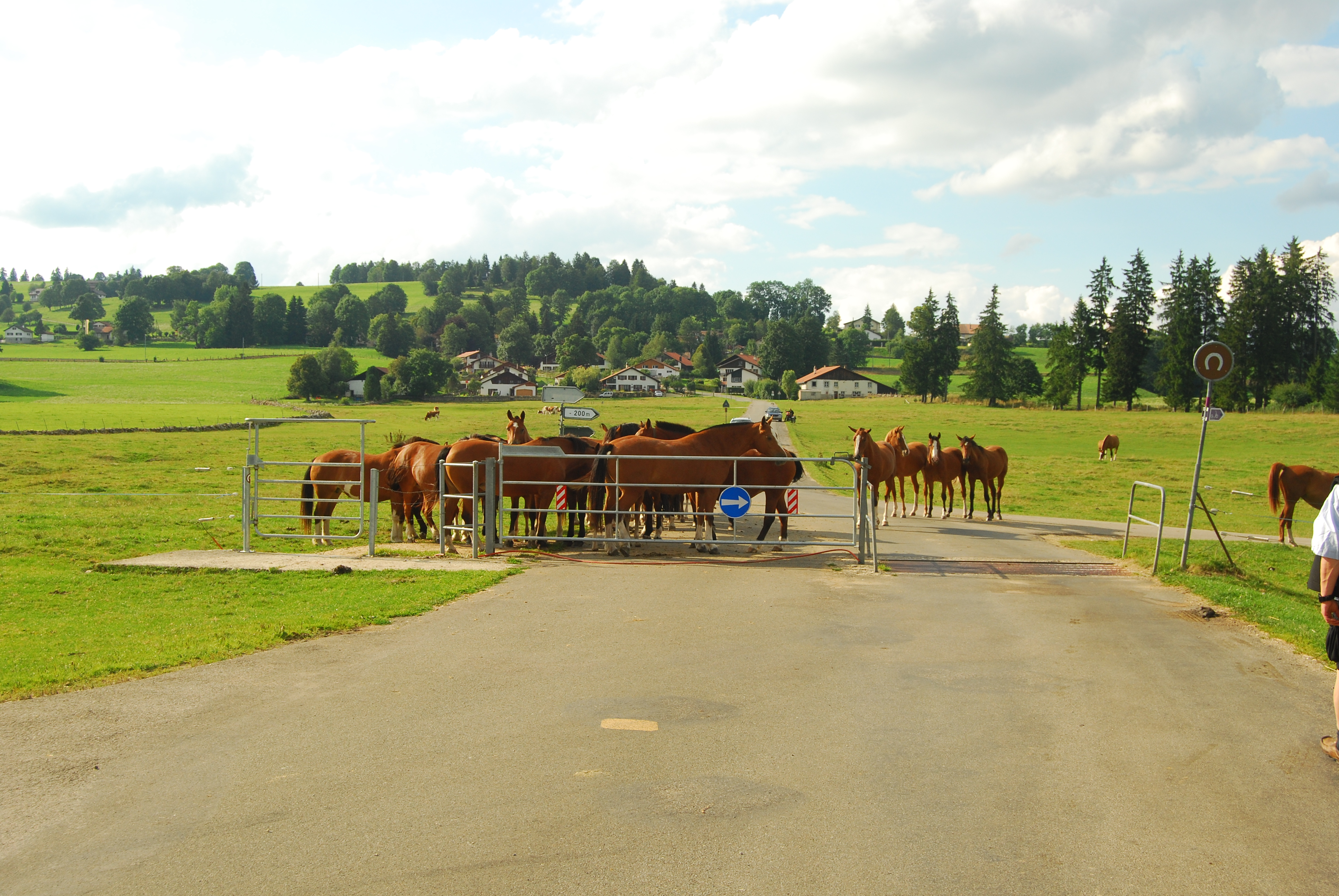
Horses in Le Bémont

As of 2010, Le Bémont had an unemployment rate of 4.3%. As of 2008, there were 70 people employed in the primary economic sector and about 30 businesses involved in this sector. 14 people were employed in the secondary sector and there were 3 businesses in this sector. 17 people were employed in the tertiary sector, with 6 businesses in this sector. There were 183 residents of the municipality who were employed in some capacity, of which females made up 38.8% of the workforce.

In 2008 the total number of full-time equivalent jobs was 76. The number of jobs in the primary sector was 51, all of which were in agriculture. The number of jobs in the secondary sector was 13 of which 8 or (61.5%) were in manufacturing and 6 (46.2%) were in construction. The number of jobs in the tertiary sector was 12. In the tertiary sector; 6 or 50.0% were in wholesale or retail sales or the repair of motor vehicles, 4 or 33.3% were in a hotel or restaurant, 3 or 25.0% were in education.

In 2000, there were 18 workers who commuted into the municipality and 97 workers who commuted away. The municipality is a net exporter of workers, with about 5.4 workers leaving the municipality for every one entering. Of the working population, 4.4% used public transportation to get to work, and 53% used a private car.

== Transport ==
The municipality has a railway station, Le Bémont, on the La Chaux-de-Fonds–Glovelier line.

== Religion ==
From the 2000 census, 264 or 76.3% were Roman Catholic, while 32 or 9.2% belonged to the Swiss Reformed Church. Of the rest of the population, there was 1 member of an Orthodox church, and there were 14 individuals (or about 4.05% of the population) who belonged to another Christian church. 29 (or about 8.38% of the population) belonged to no church, are agnostic or atheist, and 13 individuals (or about 3.76% of the population) did not answer the question.

== Education ==
In Le Bémont about 104 or (30.1%) of the population have completed non-mandatory upper secondary education, and 21 or (6.1%) have completed additional higher education (either university or a Fachhochschule). Of the 21 who completed tertiary schooling, 61.9% were Swiss men, 38.1% were Swiss women.

The Canton of Jura school system provides two year of non-obligatory Kindergarten, followed by six years of Primary school. This is followed by three years of obligatory lower Secondary school where the students are separated according to ability and aptitude. Following the lower Secondary students may attend a three or four year optional upper Secondary school followed by some form of Tertiary school or they may enter an apprenticeship.

During the 2009–10 school year, there were a total of 55 students attending 4 classes in the Le Bémont-Les Enfers school district. There was one kindergarten class with a total of 12 students in the municipality. The municipality had 3 primary classes and 43 students. There are only nine Secondary schools in the canton, so all the students from Le Bémont attend their secondary school in another municipality.

As of 2000, there were 11 students in Le Bémont who came from another municipality, while 46 residents attended schools outside the municipality.
