= Les Enfers =

- Municipality
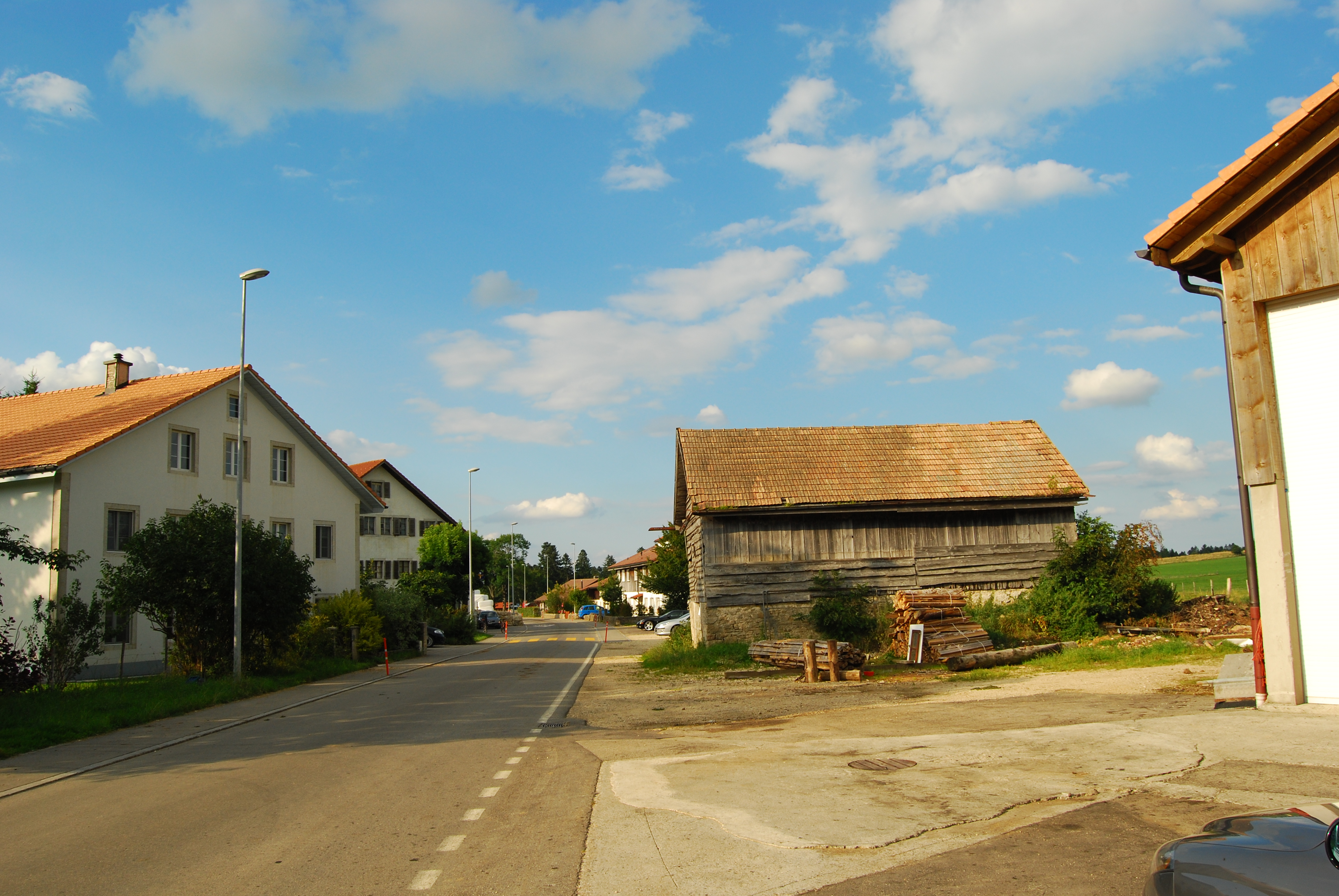
- Les Enfers village

- Coat of arms
- Location of Les Enfers
- Location within Switzerland Location within Canton of Jura
- Coordinates: 47°18′N 07°03′E
- Country: Switzerland
- Canton: Jura
- District: Franches-Montagnes

Government
  - Mayor: Maire; Samuel Oberli

Area
  - Total: 7.09 km^{2} (2.74 sq mi)
- Elevation: 955 m (3,133 ft)

Population (2020)
  - Total: 149
  - Density: 21.0/km^{2} (54.4/sq mi)
- Time zone: UTC+01:00 (CET)
  - Summer (DST): UTC+02:00 (CEST)
- Postal code: 2875
- SFOS number: 6745
- ISO 3166 code: CH-JU
- Surrounded by: Soubey, Montfavergier, Saint-Brais, Montfaucon, Saignelégier
- Website: https://lesenfers.ch/deuxpointzero/

Les Enfers (Frainc-Comtou: Lés Endfies) is a municipality in the district of Franches-Montagnes in the canton of Jura in Switzerland.

== History ==
Les Enfers is first mentioned in 1330 as Au cruz des Enfers.

== Geography ==
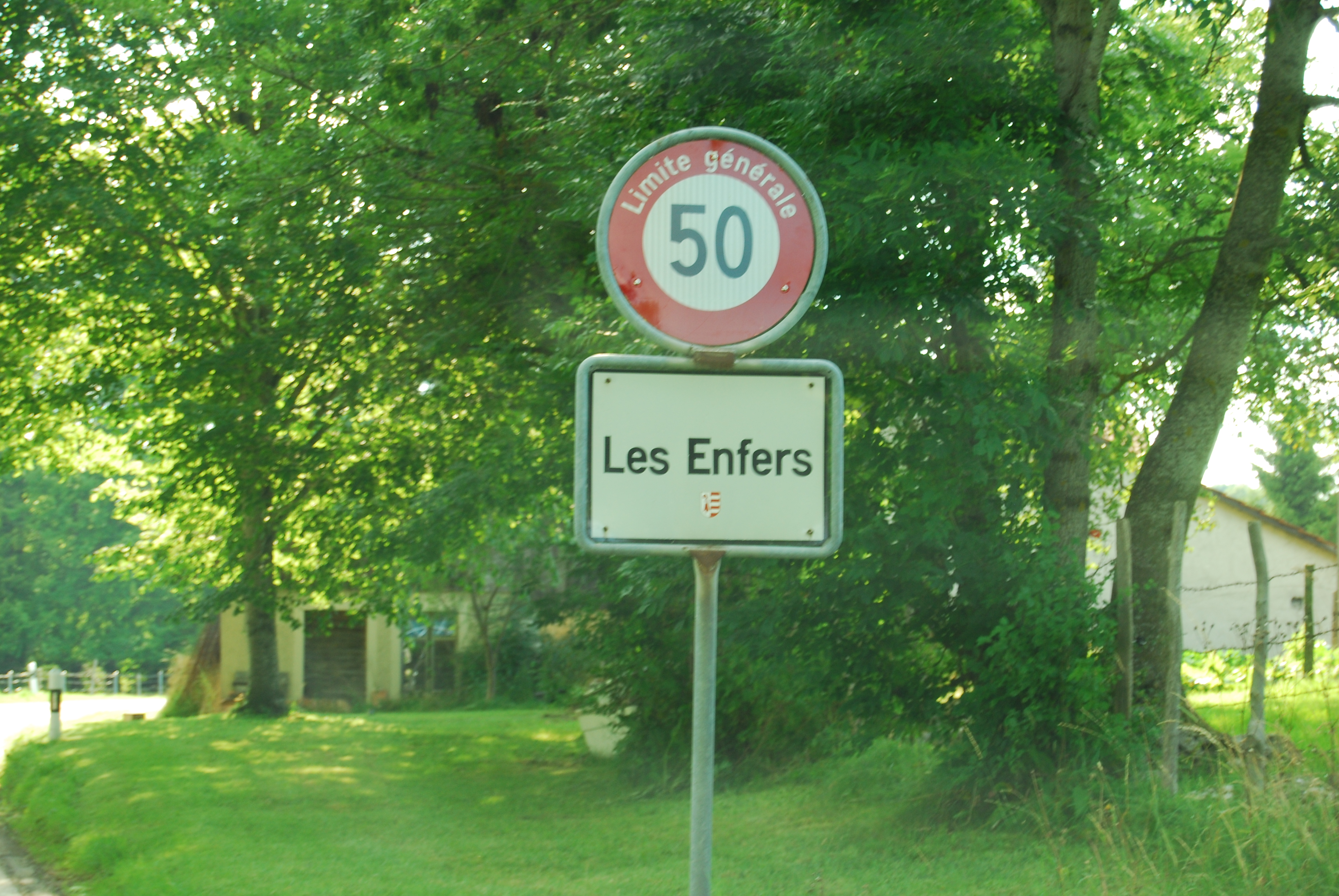
Entrance into the municipality

Les Enfers has an area of 7.12 km^{2} (2.75 sq mi). Of this area, 3.46 km^{2} (1.34 mi^{2}) or 48.5% is used for agricultural purposes, while 3.41 km^{2} (1.32 mi^{2}) or 47.8% is forested. Of the rest of the land, 0.19 km^{2} (0.073 mi^{2}) or 2.7% is settled (buildings or roads) and 0.03 km^{2} (7.4 acres) or 0.4% is unproductive land.

Of the built up area, housing and buildings made up 1.3% and transportation infrastructure made up 1.0%. Out of the forested land, 44.7% of the total land area is heavily forested and 3.1% is covered with orchards or small clusters of trees. Of the agricultural land, 8.0% is used for growing crops and 25.6% is pastures and 14.8% is used for alpine pastures.

The municipality is located in the Franches-Montagnes district. It consists of the village of Les Enfers and the hamlet of Cerniévillers.

The municipalities of Le Bémont, Les Bois, Les Breuleux, La Chaux-des-Breuleux, Les Enfers, Les Genevez, Lajoux, Montfaucon, Muriaux, Le Noirmont, Saignelégier, Saint-Brais and Soubey are considering a merger on at a date in the future into the new municipality of Franches-Montagnes.

== Coat of arms ==
The municipal coat of arms is canting for the French word for Hell.

== Demographics ==
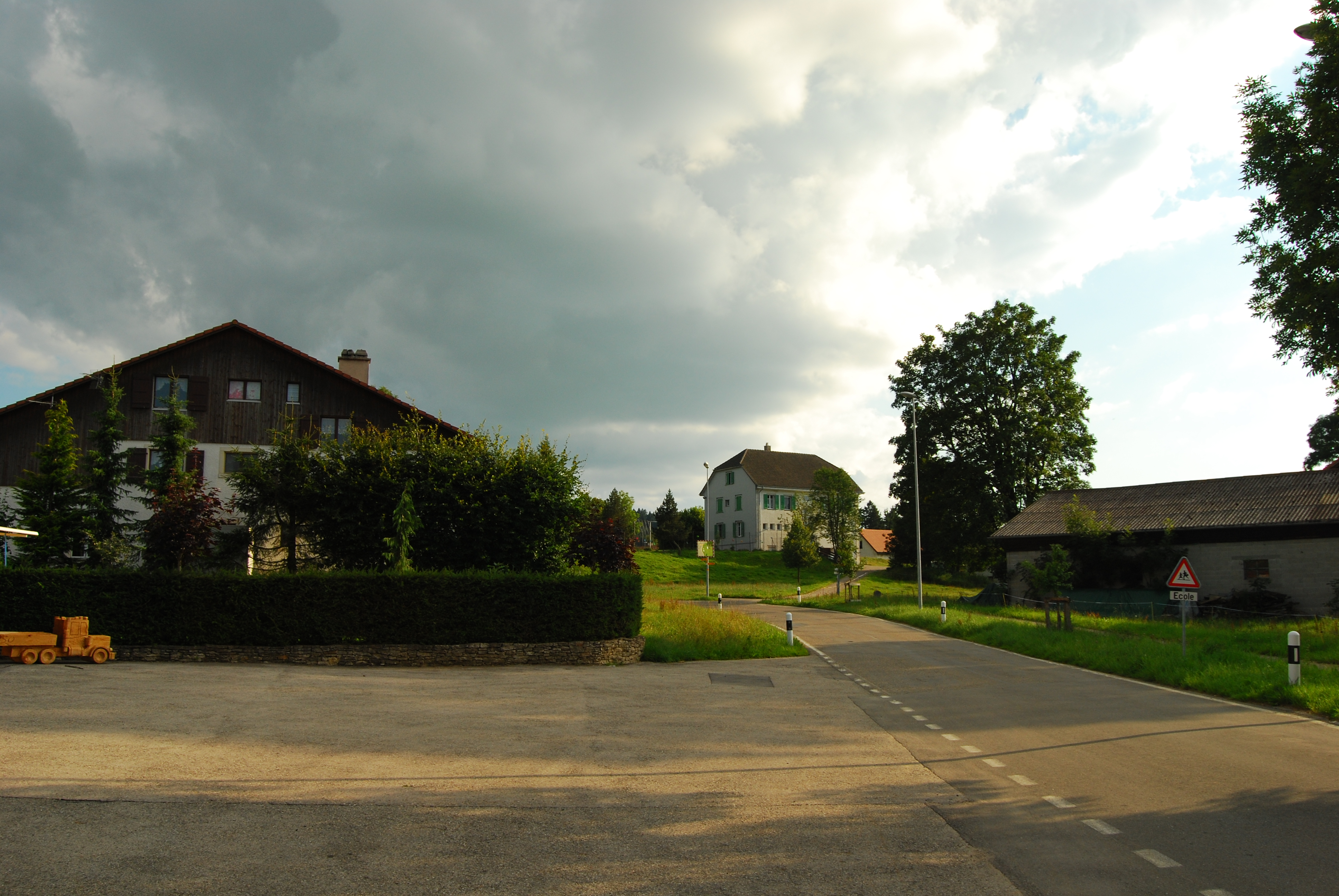
Les Enfers

Les Enfers has a population (as of December 2020) of 149. As of 2008, 1.9% of the population are resident foreign nationals. Over the last 10 years (2000–2010) the population has changed at a rate of 19.1%. Migration accounted for 0%, while births and deaths accounted for 11.5%.

Most of the population (as of 2000) speaks French (110 or 84.6%) as their first language, German is the second most common (18 or 13.8%) and English is the third (1 or 0.8%).

As of 2008, the population was 48.7% male and 51.3% female. The population was made up of 74 Swiss men (47.4% of the population) and 2 (1.3%) non-Swiss men. There were 80 Swiss women (51.3%) and (0.0%) non-Swiss women. Of the population in the municipality, 49 or about 37.7% were born in Les Enfers and lived there in 2000. There were 41 or 31.5% who were born in the same canton, while 30 or 23.1% were born somewhere else in Switzerland, and 10 or 7.7% were born outside of Switzerland.

As of 2000, children and teenagers (0–19 years old) make up 36.9% of the population, while adults (20–64 years old) make up 56.2% and seniors (over 64 years old) make up 6.9%.

As of 2000, there were 61 people who were single and never married in the municipality. There were 62 married individuals, 6 widows or widowers and 1 individual who was divorced.

As of 2000, there were 43 private households in the municipality, and an average of 3.0 persons per household. There were 7 households that consist of only one person and 9 households with five or more people. In 2000, a total of 43 apartments (72.9% of the total) were permanently occupied, while 13 apartments (22.0%) were seasonally occupied and 3 apartments (5.1%) were empty. As of 2009, the construction rate of new housing units was 12.8 new units per 1000 residents. The vacancy rate for the municipality, in 2010, was 1.49%.

The historical population is given in the following chart:

== Politics ==
In the 2007 federal election the most popular party was the SPS which received 29.81% of the vote. The next three most popular parties were the CSP (24.04%), the CVP (23.08%) and the FDP (12.5%). In the federal election, a total of 53 votes were cast, and the voter turnout was 48.2%.

== Economy ==
As of 2010, Les Enfers had an unemployment rate of 6.6%. As of 2008, there were 29 people employed in the primary economic sector and about 10 businesses involved in this sector. 3 people were employed in the secondary sector and there were 2 businesses in this sector. 7 people were employed in the tertiary sector, with 3 businesses in this sector. There were 63 residents of the municipality who were employed in some capacity, of which females made up 41.3% of the workforce.

In 2008 the total number of full-time equivalent jobs was 30. The number of jobs in the primary sector was 20, all of which were in agriculture. The number of jobs in the secondary sector was 3 of which 2 or (66.7%) were in manufacturing and 1 was in construction. The number of jobs in the tertiary sector was 7. In the tertiary sector; 5 were in wholesale or retail sales or the repair of motor vehicles, 1 was in the movement and storage of goods and 1 was in a hotel or restaurant.

In 2000, there were 20 workers who commuted into the municipality and 28 workers who commuted away. The municipality is a net exporter of workers, with about 1.4 workers leaving the municipality for every one entering. About 20.0% of the workforce coming into Les Enfers are coming from outside Switzerland. Of the working population, 1.6% used public transportation to get to work, and 47.6% used a private car.

== Religion ==
From the 2000 census, 95 or 73.1% were Roman Catholic, while 3 or 2.3% belonged to the Swiss Reformed Church. Of the rest of the population, there were 10 individuals (or about 7.69% of the population) who belonged to another Christian church. 26 (or about 20.00% of the population) belonged to no church, are agnostic or atheist, and 1 individuals (or about 0.77% of the population) did not answer the question.

== Education ==
In Les Enfers about 31 or (23.8%) of the population have completed non-mandatory upper secondary education, and 13 or (10.0%) have completed additional higher education (either university or a Fachhochschule). Of the 13 who completed tertiary schooling, 61.5% were Swiss men, 38.5% were Swiss women.

The Canton of Jura school system provides two year of non-obligatory Kindergarten, followed by six years of Primary school. This is followed by three years of obligatory lower Secondary school where the students are separated according to ability and aptitude. Following the lower Secondary students may attend a three or four year optional upper Secondary school followed by some form of Tertiary school or they may enter an apprenticeship.

During the 2009–10 school year, there were a total of 55 students attending 4 classes in the Le Bémont-Les Enfers school district. There was one kindergarten class with a total of 12 students in the municipality. The municipality had 3 primary classes and 43 students. There are only nine Secondary schools in the canton, so all the students from Les Enfers attend their secondary school in another municipality.

As of 2000, there were 10 students in Les Enfers who came from another municipality, while 23 residents attended schools outside the municipality.
