= Montfaucon, Switzerland =

Montfaucon
- Municipality
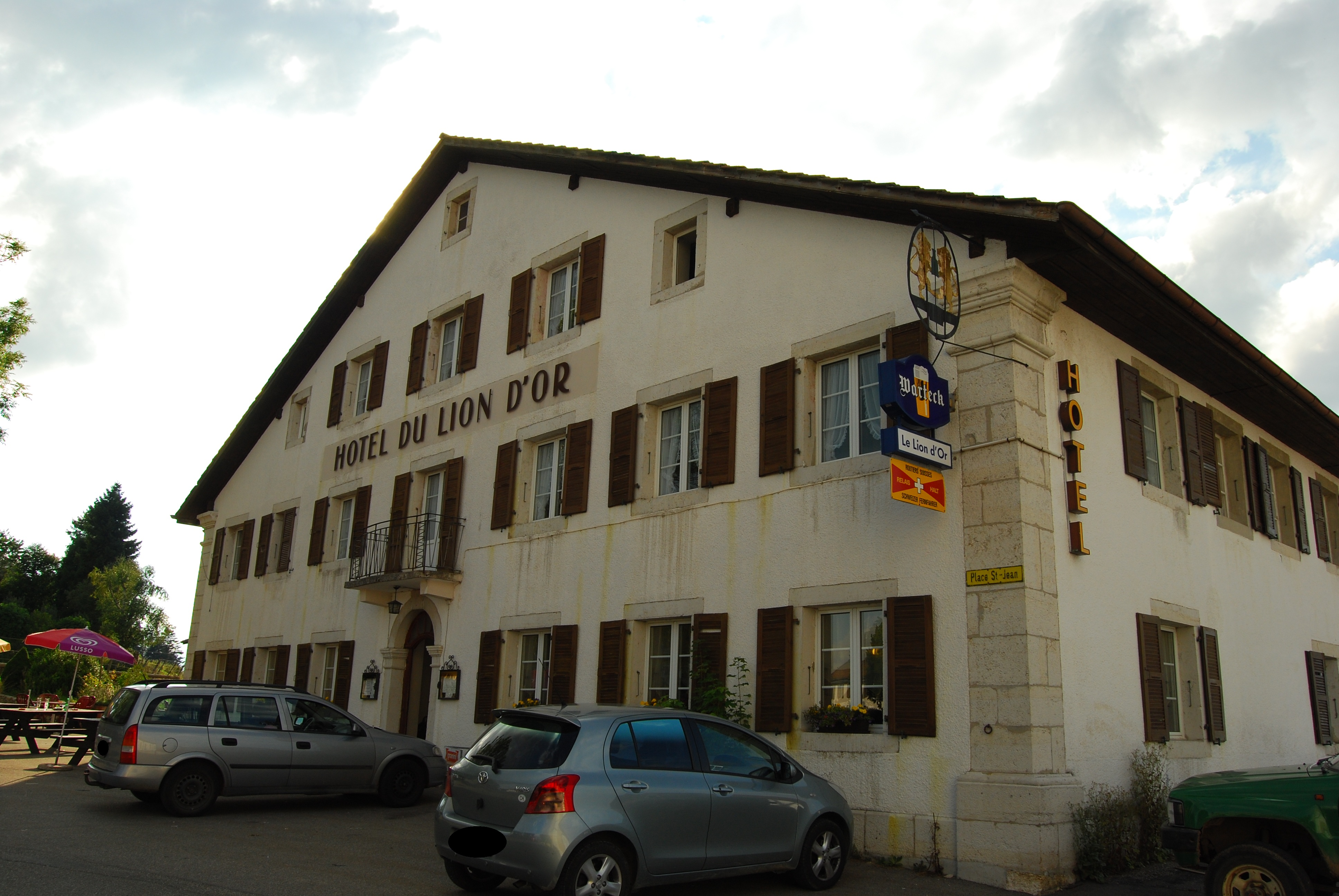
- Hotel du Lion d'Or in Montfaucon village

- Coat of arms
- Location of Montfaucon
- Location within Switzerland Location within Canton of Jura
- Coordinates: 47°17′N 07°03′E
- Country: Switzerland
- Canton: Jura
- District: Franches-Montagnes

Government
  - Executive: Conseil communal with 7 members
  - Mayor: Maire; Xavier Schaffter (as of 2026)

Area
  - Total: 18.24 km^{2} (7.04 sq mi)
- Elevation: 996 m (3,268 ft)

Population (December 2020)
  - Total: 572
  - Density: 31.4/km^{2} (81.2/sq mi)
- Time zone: UTC+01:00 (CET)
  - Summer (DST): UTC+02:00 (CEST)
- Postal code: 2362
- SFOS number: 6751
- ISO 3166 code: CH-JU
- Surrounded by: Le Bémont, Les Enfers, Saint-Brais, Lajoux, Les Genevez, Tramelan(BE)
- Website: https://www.montfaucon.ch/

Montfaucon (French pronunciation: [mɔ̃fokɔ̃]) is a municipality in the district of Franches-Montagnes in the canton of Jura in Switzerland. On 1 January 2009 the former municipality of Montfavergier merged into Montfaucon.

== History ==
Aerial view (1955)

Montfaucon is first mentioned in 1125 as de Monte Falconis. The municipality was formerly known by its German name Falkenberg, however, that name is no longer used.

== Geography ==
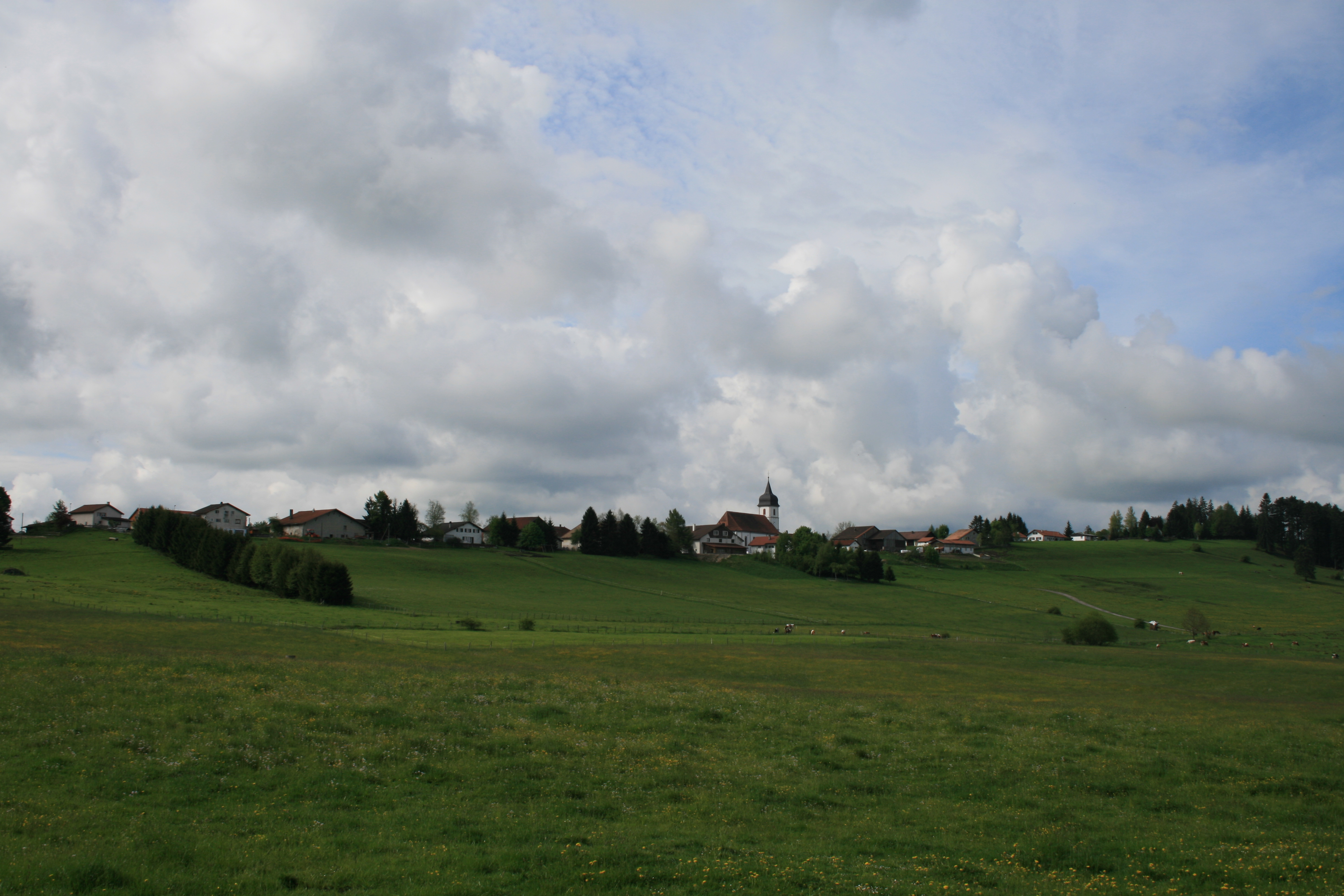
Montfaucon

Montfaucon has an area of 18.25 km^{2} (7.05 sq mi). Of this area, 11.95 km^{2} (4.61 mi^{2}) or 65.5% is used for agricultural purposes, while 5.51 km^{2} (2.13 mi^{2}) or 30.2% is forested. Of the rest of the land, 0.71 km^{2} (0.27 mi^{2}) or 3.9% is settled (buildings or roads), 0.01 km^{2} (2.5 acres) or 0.1% is either rivers or lakes and 0.1 km^{2} (25 acres) or 0.5% is unproductive land.

Of the built up area, housing and buildings made up 1.8% and transportation infrastructure made up 2.1%. Out of the forested land, 26.3% of the total land area is heavily forested and 3.9% is covered with orchards or small clusters of trees. Of the agricultural land, 4.6% is used for growing crops and 37.2% is pastures and 23.6% is used for alpine pastures. All the water in the municipality is in lakes.

The municipality is located in the Franches-Montagnes district, on a ridge between Glovelier and Saignelégier. It consists of the villages of Montfaucon and Montfavergier.

The municipalities of Le Bémont, Les Bois, Les Breuleux, La Chaux-des-Breuleux, Les Enfers, Les Genevez, Lajoux, Montfaucon, Muriaux, Le Noirmont, Saignelégier, Saint-Brais and Soubey are considering a merger on at a date in the future into the new municipality of Franches-Montagnes.

== Coat of arms ==
The blazon of the municipal coat of arms is Argent, a Falcon displayed Gules statant on Coupeaux of the same. This is an example of canting since the name Montfaucon means Falcon Mountain.

== Demographics ==
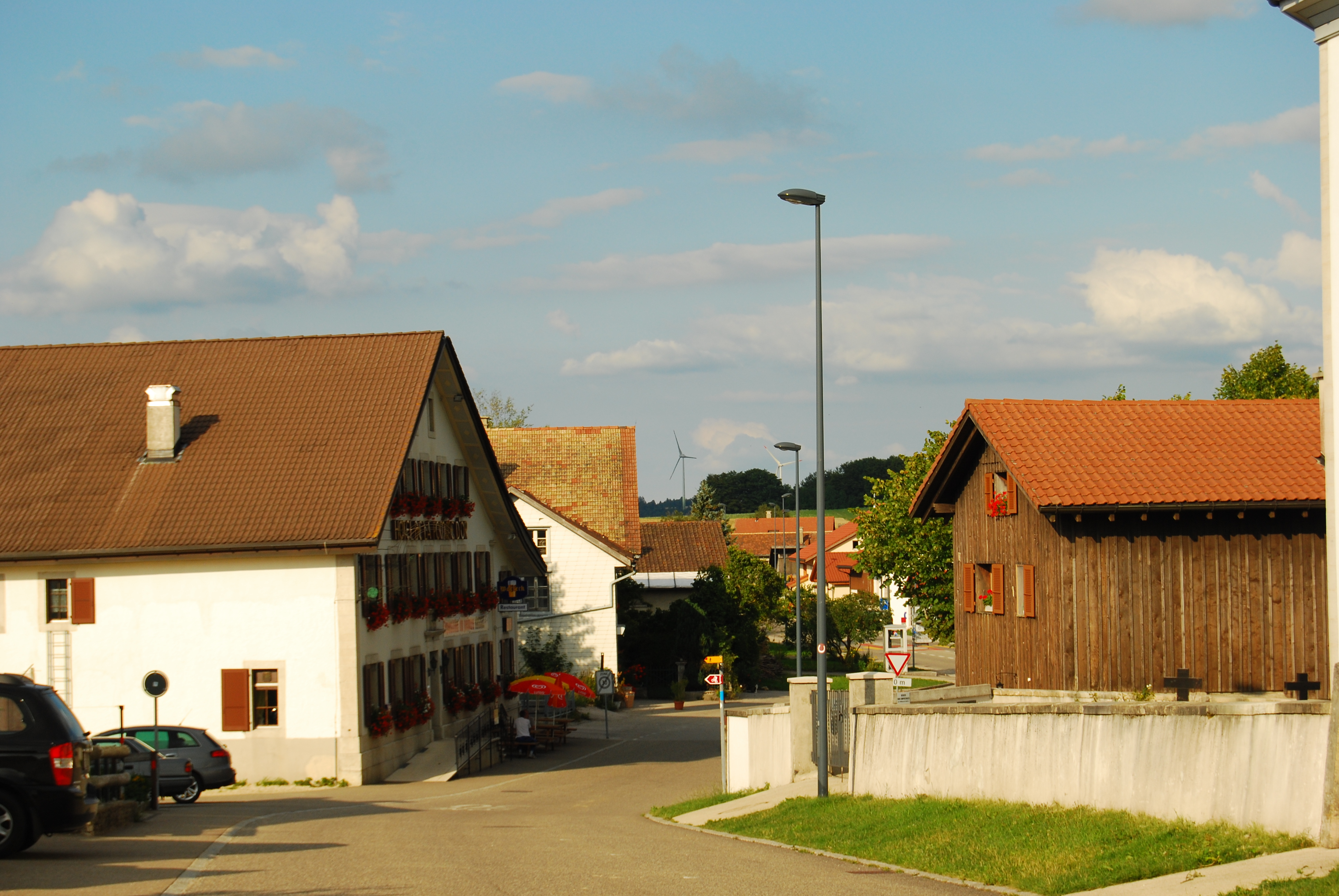
Montfaucon village

Montfaucon has a population (as of December 2020) of 572. As of 2008, 4.5% of the population are resident foreign nationals. Over the last 10 years (2000–2010) the population has changed at a rate of 7.4%. Migration accounted for 3.7%, while births and deaths accounted for 3.7%.

Most of the population (as of 2000) speaks French (445 or 91.8%) as their first language, German is the second most common (35 or 7.2%) and Spanish is the third (2 or 0.4%).

As of 2008, the population was 50.2% male and 49.8% female. The population was made up of 279 Swiss men (47.8% of the population) and 14 (2.4%) non-Swiss men. There were 276 Swiss women (47.3%) and 15 (2.6%) non-Swiss women. Of the population in the municipality, 215 or about 44.3% were born in Montfaucon and lived there in 2000. There were 135 or 27.8% who were born in the same canton, while 92 or 19.0% were born somewhere else in Switzerland, and 25 or 5.2% were born outside of Switzerland.

As of 2000, children and teenagers (0–19 years old) make up 26.2% of the population, while adults (20–64 years old) make up 59.6% and seniors (over 64 years old) make up 14.2%.

As of 2000, there were 220 people who were single and never married in the municipality. There were 222 married individuals, 24 widows or widowers and 19 individuals who are divorced.

As of 2000, there were 200 private households in the municipality, and an average of 2.6 persons per household. There were 55 households that consist of only one person and 18 households with five or more people. In 2000, a total of 182 apartments (65.2% of the total) were permanently occupied, while 45 apartments (16.1%) were seasonally occupied and 52 apartments (18.6%) were empty. As of 2009, the construction rate of new housing units was 12 new units per 1000 residents. The vacancy rate for the municipality, in 2010, was 1.53%.

The historical population is given in the following chart:

== Politics ==
In the 2007 federal election the most popular party was the CSP which received 28.17% of the vote. The next three most popular parties were the SPS (23.66%), the CVP (22.82%) and the FDP (14.08%). In the federal election, a total of 181 votes were cast, and the voter turnout was 44.3%.

== Economy ==
As of 2010, Montfaucon had an unemployment rate of 3.7%. As of 2008, there were 67 people employed in the primary economic sector and about 29 businesses involved in this sector. 34 people were employed in the secondary sector and there were 8 businesses in this sector. 76 people were employed in the tertiary sector, with 17 businesses in this sector. There were 258 residents of the municipality who were employed in some capacity, of which females made up 42.2% of the workforce.

In 2008 the total number of full-time equivalent jobs was 130. The number of jobs in the primary sector was 45, all of which were in agriculture. The number of jobs in the secondary sector was 29, all of which were in manufacturing. The number of jobs in the tertiary sector was 56. In the tertiary sector; 13 or 23.2% were in wholesale or retail sales or the repair of motor vehicles, 4 or 7.1% were in the movement and storage of goods, 26 or 46.4% were in a hotel or restaurant, 8 or 14.3% were the insurance or financial industry, 4 or 7.1% were in education.

In 2000, there were 41 workers who commuted into the municipality and 154 workers who commuted away. The municipality is a net exporter of workers, with about 3.8 workers leaving the municipality for every one entering. About 22.0% of the workforce coming into Montfaucon are coming from outside Switzerland. Of the working population, 4.4% used public transportation to get to work, and 60% used a private car.

== Transport ==
Train station Pré-Petitjean at Montfaucon

The municipality has two railway stations, La Combe and Pré-Petitjean. Both are located on the La Chaux-de-Fonds–Glovelier line.

== Religion ==
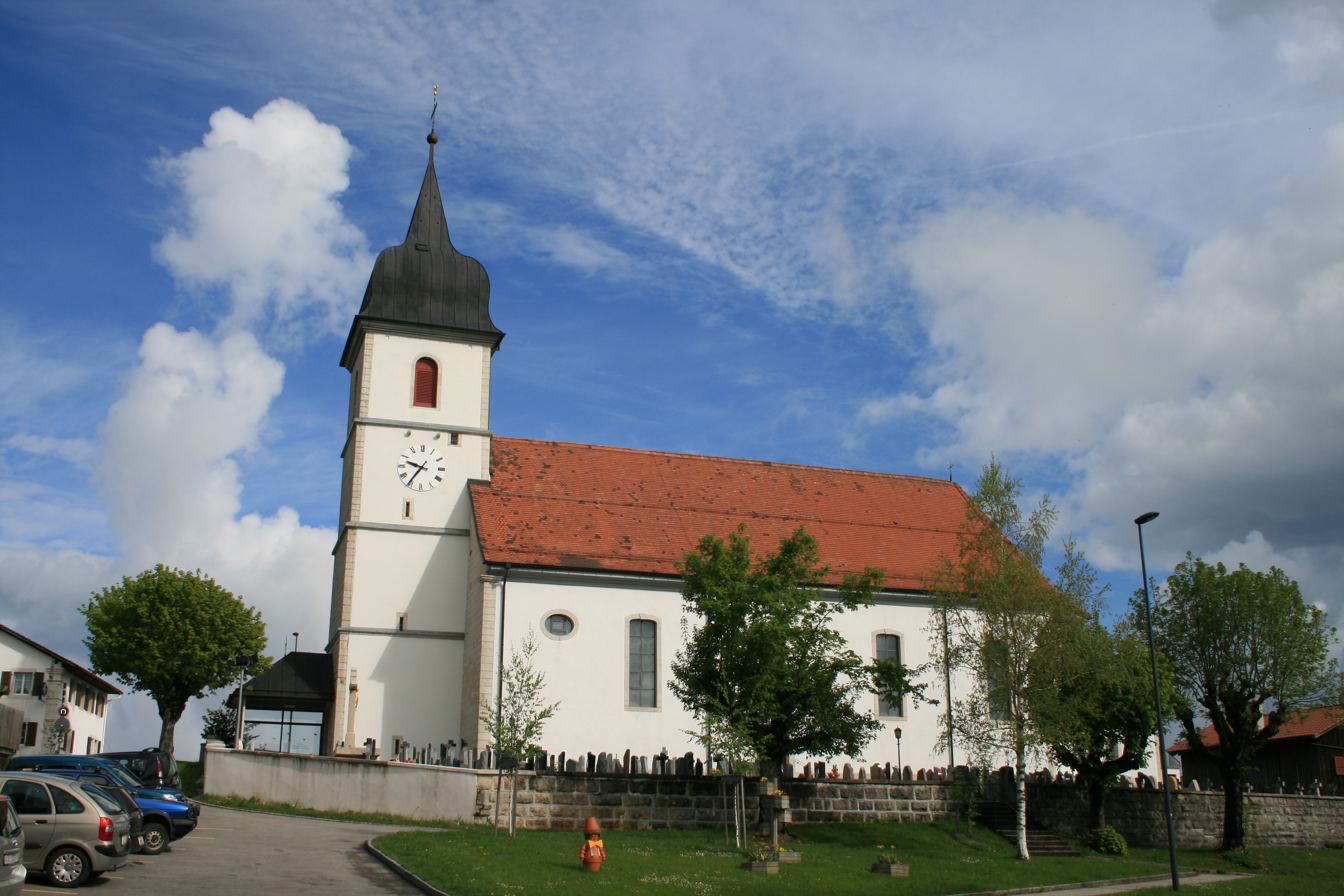
Village church

From the 2000 census, 344 or 70.9% were Roman Catholic, while 57 or 11.8% belonged to the Swiss Reformed Church. Of the rest of the population, there were 2 members of an Orthodox church (or about 0.41% of the population), and there were 50 individuals (or about 10.31% of the population) who belonged to another Christian church. There were 2 (or about 0.41% of the population) who were Islamic. There were 1 individual who belonged to another church. 33 (or about 6.80% of the population) belonged to no church, are agnostic or atheist, and 21 individuals (or about 4.33% of the population) did not answer the question.

== Education ==
In Montfaucon about 166 or (34.2%) of the population have completed non-mandatory upper secondary education, and 35 or (7.2%) have completed additional higher education (either university or a Fachhochschule). Of the 35 who completed tertiary schooling, 60.0% were Swiss men, 31.4% were Swiss women.

The Canton of Jura school system provides two year of non-obligatory Kindergarten, followed by six years of Primary school. This is followed by three years of obligatory lower Secondary school where the students are separated according to ability and aptitude. Following the lower Secondary students may attend a three or four year optional upper Secondary school followed by some form of Tertiary school or they may enter an apprenticeship.

During the 2009–10 school year, there were a total of 47 students attending 3 classes in Montfaucon. There was one kindergarten class with 9 students in the municipality. The municipality had 3 primary classes and 47 students. There are only nine Secondary schools in the canton, so all the students from Montfaucon attend their secondary school in another municipality.

As of 2000, there were 9 students in Montfaucon who came from another municipality, while 43 residents attended schools outside the municipality.
