= Soubey =

- Municipality
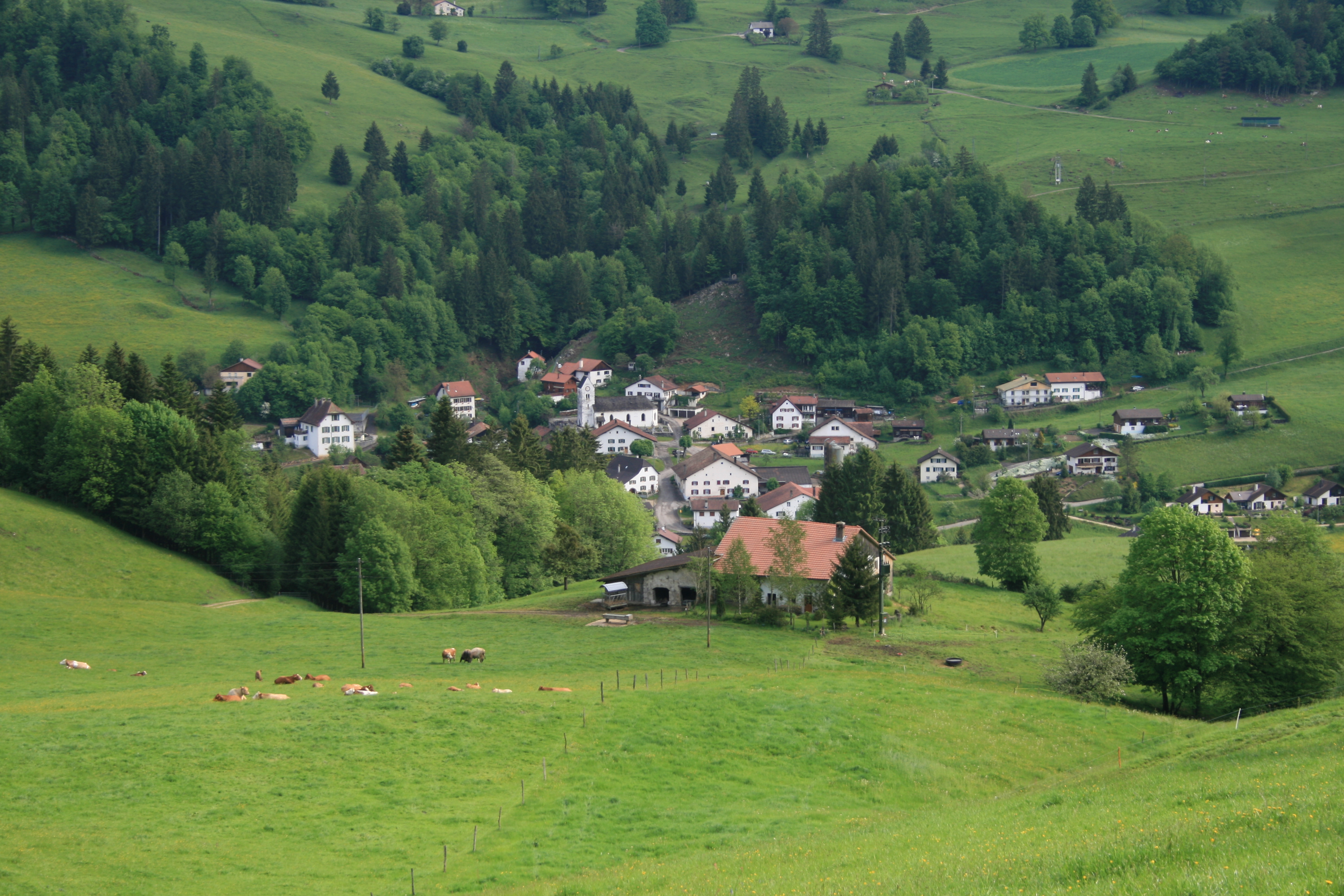
- Soubey village

- Coat of arms
- Location of Soubey
- Location within Switzerland Location within Canton of Jura
- Coordinates: 47°18′N 07°03′E
- Country: Switzerland
- Canton: Jura
- District: Franches-Montagnes

Government
  - Executive: Conseil communal with 5 members
  - Mayor: Maire; Jacques Tosoni (as of 2026)

Area
  - Total: 13.51 km^{2} (5.22 sq mi)
- Elevation: 476 m (1,562 ft)

Population (2020)
  - Total: 131
  - Density: 9.70/km^{2} (25.1/sq mi)
- Time zone: UTC+01:00 (CET)
  - Summer (DST): UTC+02:00 (CEST)
- Postal code: 2887
- SFOS number: 6759
- ISO 3166 code: CH-JU
- Surrounded by: Les Pommerats, Les Enfers, Epiquerez, Burnevillers(F), Indevillers(F)
- Website: www.soubey.ch

Soubey is a municipality in the district of Franches-Montagnes in the canton of Jura in Switzerland.

== History ==
Soubey is first mentioned in 1340 as Subeis. In 1369 it was mentioned as Subiez.

Because Soubey is among the few locations in Switzerland with no cell phone reception and few other sources of electromagnetic radiation, it has attracted – to the disapproval of its residents – numerous visitors seeking relief from electromagnetic hypersensitivity.

== Geography ==
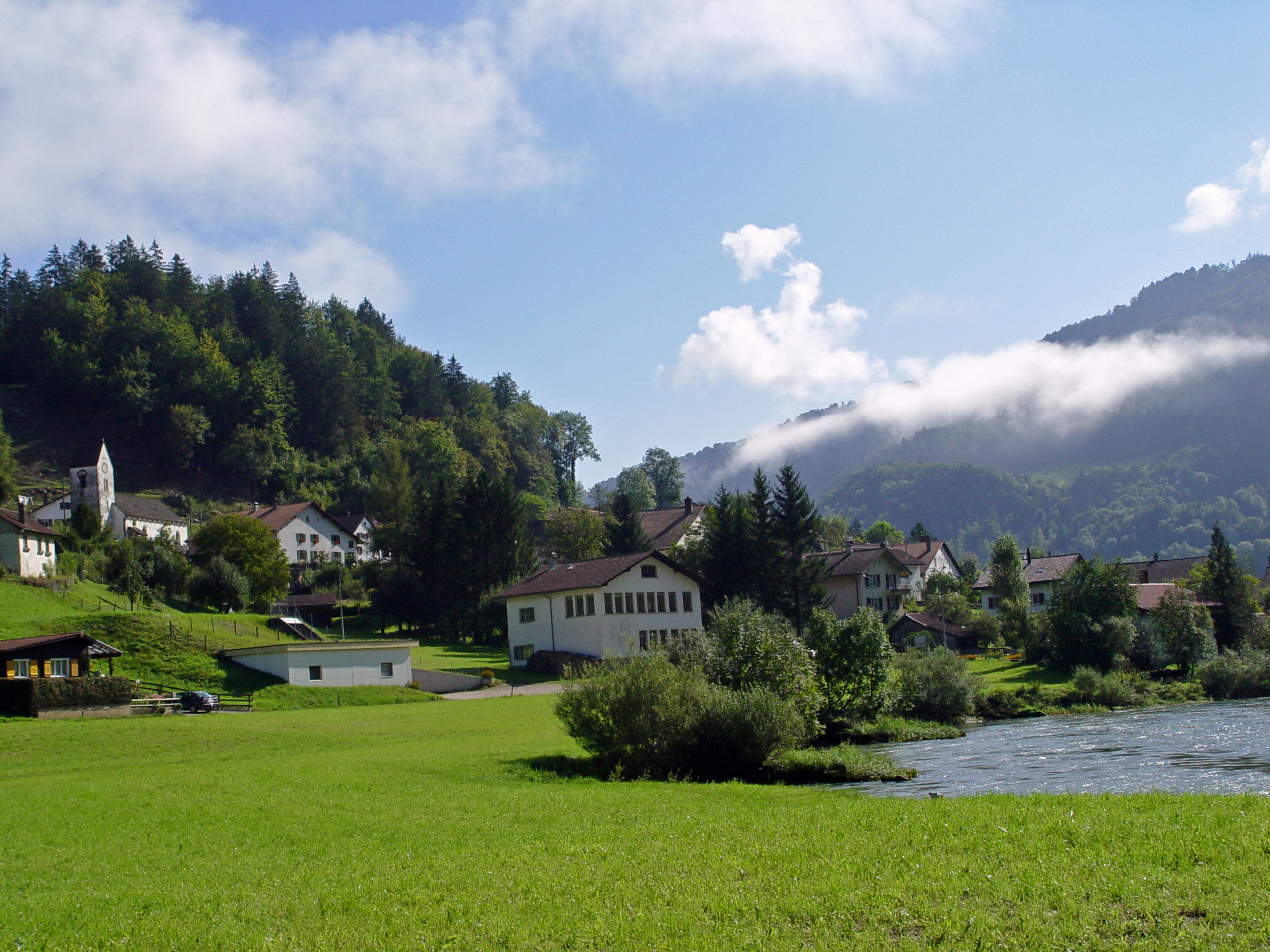
Soubey village

Soubey has an area of 13.49 km^{2} (5.21 sq mi). Of this area, 5.19 km^{2} (2.00 mi^{2}) or 38.5% is used for agricultural purposes, while 7.65 km^{2} (2.95 mi^{2}) or 56.8% is forested. Of the rest of the land, 0.3 km^{2} (0.12 mi^{2}) or 2.2% is settled (buildings or roads), 0.31 km^{2} (0.12 mi^{2}) or 2.3% is either rivers or lakes and 0.04 km^{2} (9.9 acres) or 0.3% is unproductive land.

Of the built up area, housing and buildings made up 1.0% and transportation infrastructure made up 1.2%. Out of the forested land, 54.0% of the total land area is heavily forested and 2.8% is covered with orchards or small clusters of trees. Of the agricultural land, 3.5% is used for growing crops and 24.7% is pastures and 10.1% is used for alpine pastures. All the water in the municipality is flowing water.

The municipality is located in the Franches-Montagnes district and straddles the Doubs river. It consists of the village of Soubey and the hamlets of Clairbief, Chercenay, Froidevaux and Le Chaufour on the left side of the river as well as the hamlets of Lobschez and Les Moulins on the right side.

The municipalities of Le Bémont, Les Bois, Les Breuleux, La Chaux-des-Breuleux, Les Enfers, Les Genevez, Lajoux, Montfaucon, Muriaux, Le Noirmont, Saignelégier, Saint-Brais and Soubey are considering a merger on at a date in the future into the new municipality of Franches-Montagnes.

== Coat of arms ==
The blazon of the municipal coat of arms is Or, a Pike embowed Azure.

== Demographics ==
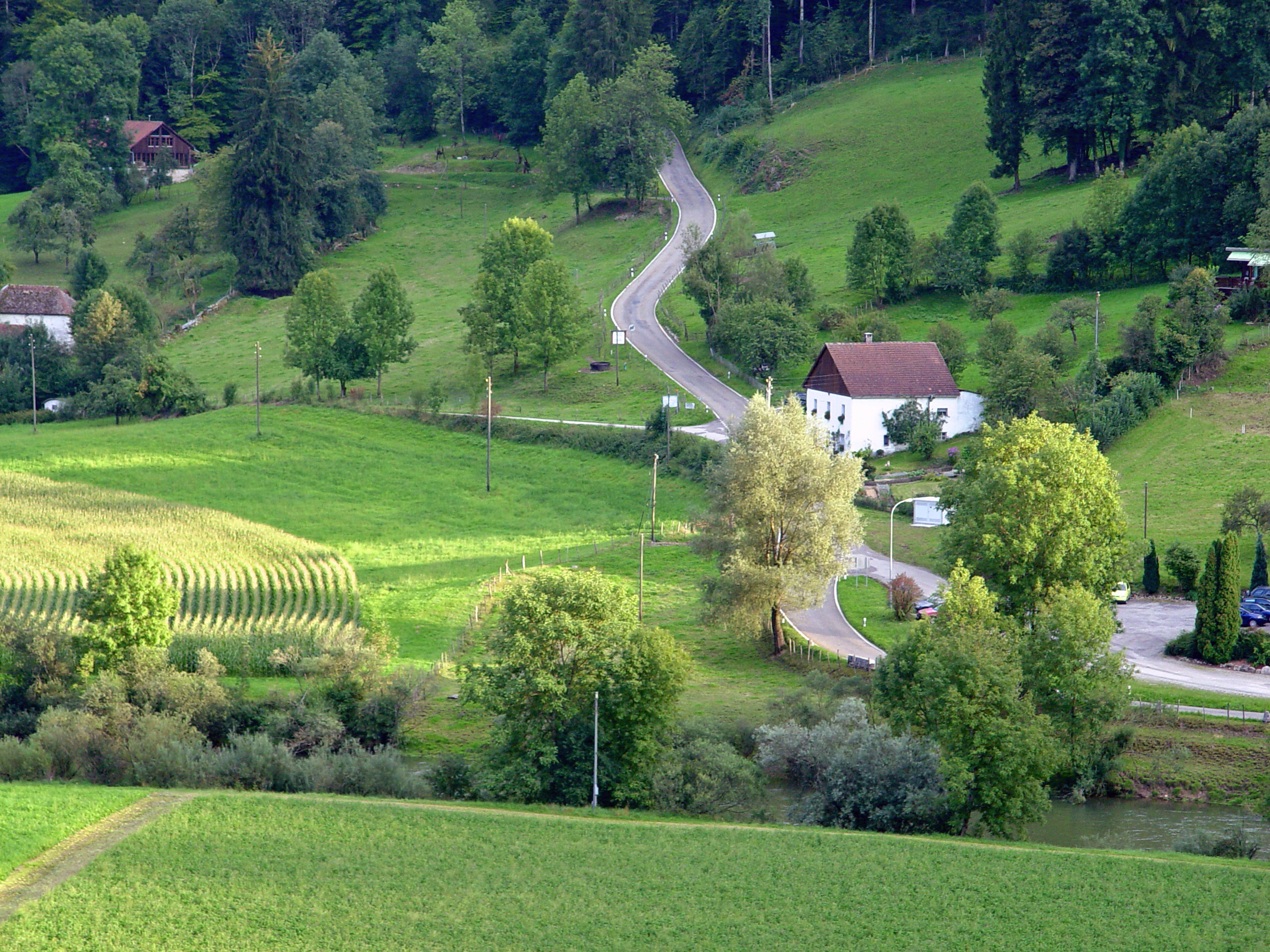
Scattered farm houses near Soubey

Soubey has a population (as of December 2020) of 131. As of 2008, 4.4% of the population are resident foreign nationals. Over the last 10 years (2000–2010) the population has changed at a rate of 5.5%. Migration accounted for 8.3%, while births and deaths accounted for -4.1%.

Most of the population (as of 2000) speaks French (114 or 83.8%) as their first language with the rest speaking German

As of 2008, the population was 54.2% male and 45.8% female. The population was made up of 81 Swiss men (52.9% of the population) and 2 (1.3%) non-Swiss men. There were 66 Swiss women (43.1%) and 4 (2.6%) non-Swiss women. Of the population in the municipality, 62 or about 45.6% were born in Soubey and lived there in 2000. There were 32 or 23.5% who were born in the same canton, while 31 or 22.8% were born somewhere else in Switzerland, and 7 or 5.1% were born outside of Switzerland.

As of 2000, children and teenagers (0–19 years old) make up 22.8% of the population, while adults (20–64 years old) make up 55.9% and seniors (over 64 years old) make up 21.3%.

As of 2000, there were 65 people who were single and never married in the municipality. There were 60 married individuals, 5 widows or widowers and 6 individuals who are divorced.

As of 2000, there were 44 private households in the municipality, and an average of 3.0 persons per household. There were 13 households that consist of only one person and 8 households with five or more people. In 2000, a total of 42 apartments (30.0% of the total) were permanently occupied, while 83 apartments (59.3%) were seasonally occupied and 15 apartments (10.7%) were empty. The vacancy rate for the municipality, in 2010, was 7.14%.

The historical population is given in the following chart:

== Politics ==
In the 2007 federal election the most popular party was the SVP which received 38.39% of the vote. The next three most popular parties were the CVP (28.57%), the FDP (19.64%) and the SPS (10.71%). In the federal election, a total of 58 votes were cast, and the voter turnout was 43.0%.

== Economy ==
As of 2010, Soubey had an unemployment rate of 1.8%. As of 2008, there were 42 people employed in the primary economic sector and about 15 businesses involved in this sector. No one was employed in the secondary sector. 24 people were employed in the tertiary sector, with 7 businesses in this sector. There were 62 residents of the municipality who were employed in some capacity, of which females made up 41.9% of the workforce.

In 2008 the total number of full-time equivalent jobs was 52. The number of jobs in the primary sector was 31, of which 29 were in agriculture and 1 was in forestry or lumber production. There were no jobs in the secondary sector. The number of jobs in the tertiary sector was 21. In the tertiary sector; 2 or 9.5% were in wholesale or retail sales or the repair of motor vehicles, 12 or 57.1% were in a hotel or restaurant, and 1 was a technical professional or scientist.

In 2000, there were 5 workers who commuted into the municipality and 8 workers who commuted away. The municipality is a net exporter of workers, with about 1.6 workers leaving the municipality for every one entering. Of the working population, 6.5% used public transportation to get to work, and 14.5% used a private car.

== Religion ==
From the 2000 census, 95 or 69.9% were Roman Catholic, while 28 or 20.6% belonged to the Swiss Reformed Church. Of the rest of the population, there was 1 individual who belongs to the Christian Catholic Church. 11 (or about 8.09% of the population) belonged to no church, are agnostic or atheist, and 1 individuals (or about 0.74% of the population) did not answer the question.

== Education ==
In Soubey about 37 or (27.2%) of the population have completed non-mandatory upper secondary education, and 8 or (5.9%) have completed additional higher education (either university or a Fachhochschule). Of the 8 who completed tertiary schooling, 75.0% were Swiss men, 12.5% were Swiss women.

The Canton of Jura school system provides two year of non-obligatory Kindergarten, followed by six years of Primary school. This is followed by three years of obligatory lower Secondary school where the students are separated according to ability and aptitude. Following the lower Secondary students may attend a three or four year optional upper Secondary school followed by some form of Tertiary school or they may enter an apprenticeship.

During the 2009–10 school year, there were no students attending school in Soubey.

As of 2000, there were 11 students in Soubey who came from another municipality, while 12 residents attended schools outside the municipality.
