= Lajoux, Switzerland =

Lajoux
- Municipality
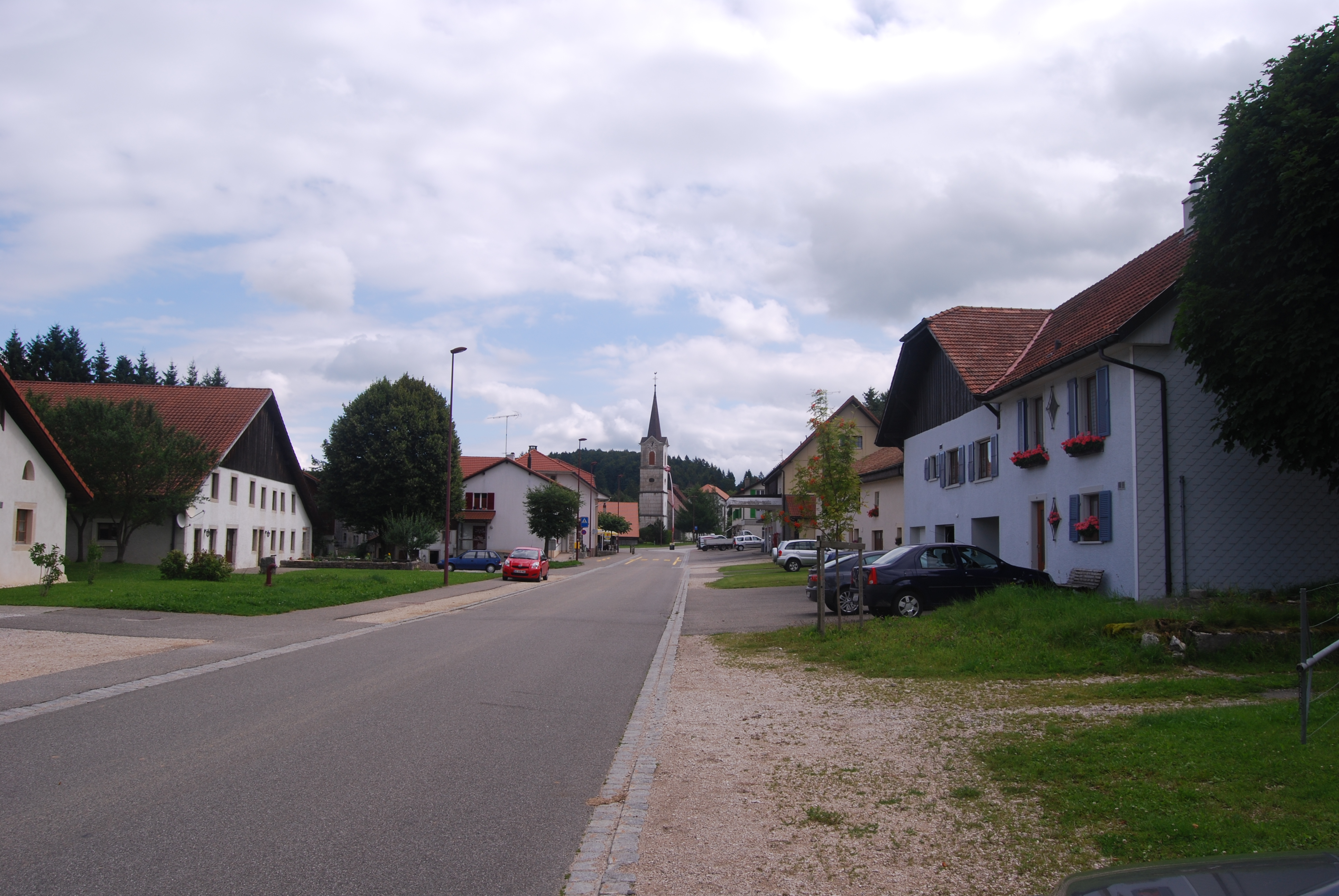
- Lajoux village

- Coat of arms
- Location of Lajoux
- Location within Switzerland Location within Canton of Jura
- Coordinates: 47°17′N 07°08′E
- Country: Switzerland
- Canton: Jura
- District: Franches-Montagnes

Government
  - Executive: Conseil communal with 7 members
  - Mayor: Maire; François Brahier-Jeckelmann (as of 2026)

Area
  - Total: 12.35 km^{2} (4.77 sq mi)
- Elevation: 960 m (3,150 ft)

Population (2020)
  - Total: 671
  - Density: 54.3/km^{2} (141/sq mi)
- Demonym: Djoulais
- Time zone: UTC+01:00 (CET)
  - Summer (DST): UTC+02:00 (CEST)
- Postal code: 2718
- SFOS number: 6750
- ISO 3166 code: CH-JU
- Surrounded by: Les Genevez, Montfaucon, Saint-Brais, Saulcy, Rebévelier(BE), Châtelat(BE), Saicourt(BE)
- Website: www.lajoux.ch

Lajoux (French: [laʒu]; Arpitan: La Jor [la ˈdzɑ]) is a municipality in the district of Franches-Montagnes in the canton of Jura in Switzerland.

== History ==
Lajoux is first mentioned in 1404 as La Jous Mertinatt.

== Geography ==
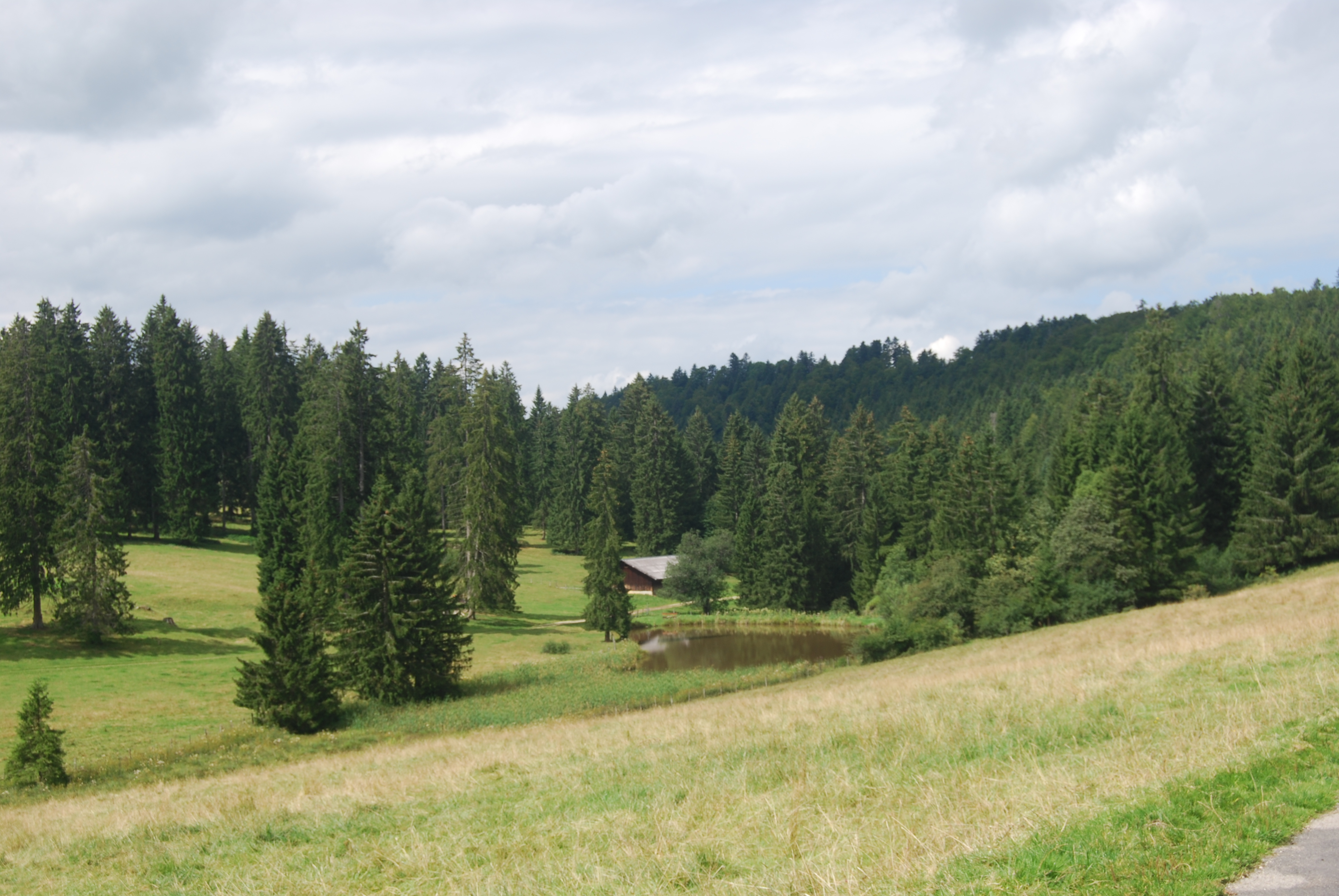
Pond and hills outside Lajoux

Aerial view (1953)

Lajoux has an area of 12.38 km^{2} (4.78 sq mi). Of this area, 7.76 km^{2} (3.00 mi^{2}) or 62.7% is used for agricultural purposes, while 3.98 km^{2} (1.54 mi^{2}) or 32.1% is forested. Of the rest of the land, 0.57 km^{2} (0.22 mi^{2}) or 4.6% is settled (buildings or roads), 0.02 km^{2} (4.9 acres) or 0.2% is either rivers or lakes and 0.04 km^{2} (9.9 acres) or 0.3% is unproductive land.

Of the built up area, housing and buildings made up 2.7% and transportation infrastructure made up 1.6%. Out of the forested land, 28.0% of the total land area is heavily forested and 4.1% is covered with orchards or small clusters of trees. Of the agricultural land, 10.4% is used for growing crops and 28.5% is pastures and 23.7% is used for alpine pastures. All the water in the municipality is in lakes.

The municipality is located in the Franches-Montagnes district. It consists of the village of Lajoux and the hamlets of Fornet-Dessus and Les Vacheries.

The municipalities of Le Bémont, Les Bois, Les Breuleux, La Chaux-des-Breuleux, Les Enfers, Les Genevez, Lajoux, Montfaucon, Muriaux, Le Noirmont, Saignelégier, Saint-Brais and Soubey are considering a merger at a date in the future into the new municipality of Franches-Montagnes.

== Coat of arms ==
The blazon of the municipal coat of arms is Azure, issuant from sinister a hand clad Argent holding a crosier Or in pale issuant from base.

== Demographics ==
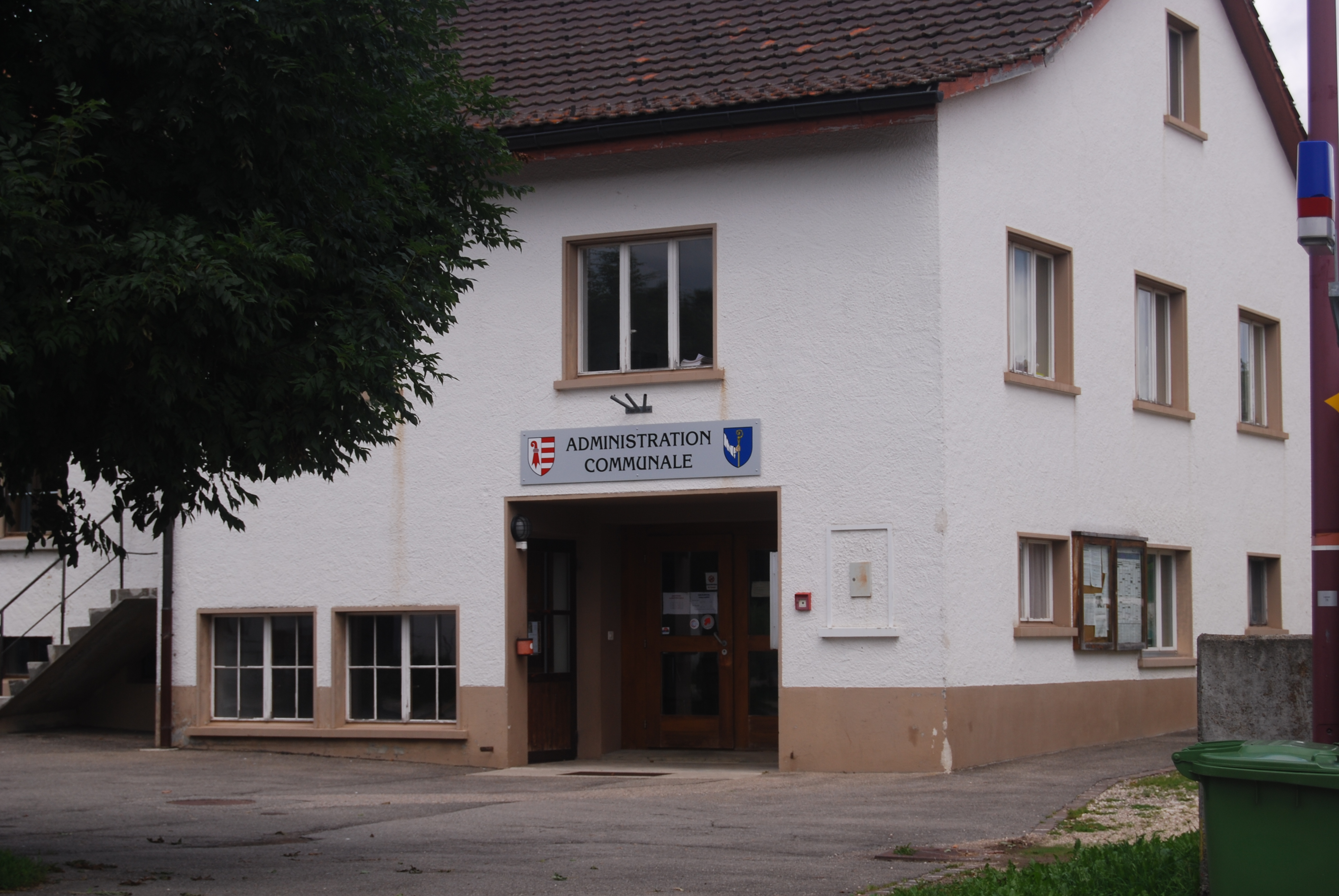
Municipal administration building in Lajoux

Lajoux has a population (as of December 2020) of 671. As of 2008, 6.1% of the population are resident foreign nationals. Over the last 10 years (2000–2010) the population has changed at a rate of 10.5%. Migration accounted for 8.1%, while births and deaths accounted for 2.1%.

Most of the population (as of 2000) speaks French (572 or 94.4%) as their first language, German is the second most common (25 or 4.1%) and Italian is the third (3 or 0.5%).

As of 2008, the population was 49.2% male and 50.8% female. The population was made up of 311 Swiss men (45.5% of the population) and 25 (3.7%) non-Swiss men. There were 324 Swiss women (47.4%) and 23 (3.4%) non-Swiss women. Of the population in the municipality, 326 or about 53.8% were born in Lajoux and lived there in 2000. There were 99 or 16.3% who were born in the same canton, while 112 or 18.5% were born somewhere else in Switzerland, and 46 or 7.6% were born outside of Switzerland.

As of 2000, children and teenagers (0–19 years old) make up 26.9% of the population, while adults (20–64 years old) make up 55.8% and seniors (over 64 years old) make up 17.3%.

As of 2000, there were 264 people who were single and never married in the municipality. There were 288 married individuals, 32 widows or widowers and 22 individuals who are divorced.

As of 2000, there were 226 private households in the municipality, and an average of 2.6 persons per household. There were 52 households that consist of only one person and 28 households with five or more people. In 2000, a total of 223 apartments (82.0% of the total) were permanently occupied, while 38 apartments (14.0%) were seasonally occupied and 11 apartments (4.0%) were empty. As of 2009, the construction rate of new housing units was 2.9 new units per 1000 residents.

The historical population is given in the following chart:

== Politics ==
In the 2007 federal election the most popular party was the SPS which received 55.98% of the vote. The next three most popular parties were the CSP (17.81%), the CVP (12.47%) and the SVP (8.14%). In the federal election, a total of 203 votes were cast, and the voter turnout was 39.3%.

== Economy ==
As of 2010, Lajoux had an unemployment rate of 5.5%. As of 2008, there were 50 people employed in the primary economic sector and about 21 businesses involved in this sector. 76 people were employed in the secondary sector and there were 11 businesses in this sector. 88 people were employed in the tertiary sector, with 13 businesses in this sector. There were 303 residents of the municipality who were employed in some capacity, of which females made up 45.2% of the workforce.

In 2008 the total number of full-time equivalent jobs was 168. The number of jobs in the primary sector was 35, all of which were in agriculture. The number of jobs in the secondary sector was 73 of which 54 or (74.0%) were in manufacturing and 18 (24.7%) were in construction. The number of jobs in the tertiary sector was 60. In the tertiary sector; 10 or 16.7% were in wholesale or retail sales or the repair of motor vehicles, 2 or 3.3% were in the movement and storage of goods, 6 or 10.0% were in a hotel or restaurant, 2 or 3.3% were technical professionals or scientists, 6 or 10.0% were in education and 31 or 51.7% were in health care.

In 2000, there were 59 workers who commuted into the municipality and 164 workers who commuted away. The municipality is a net exporter of workers, with about 2.8 workers leaving the municipality for every one entering. About 15.3% of the workforce coming into Lajoux are coming from outside Switzerland. Of the working population, 3.6% used public transportation to get to work, and 57.4% used a private car.

== Religion ==
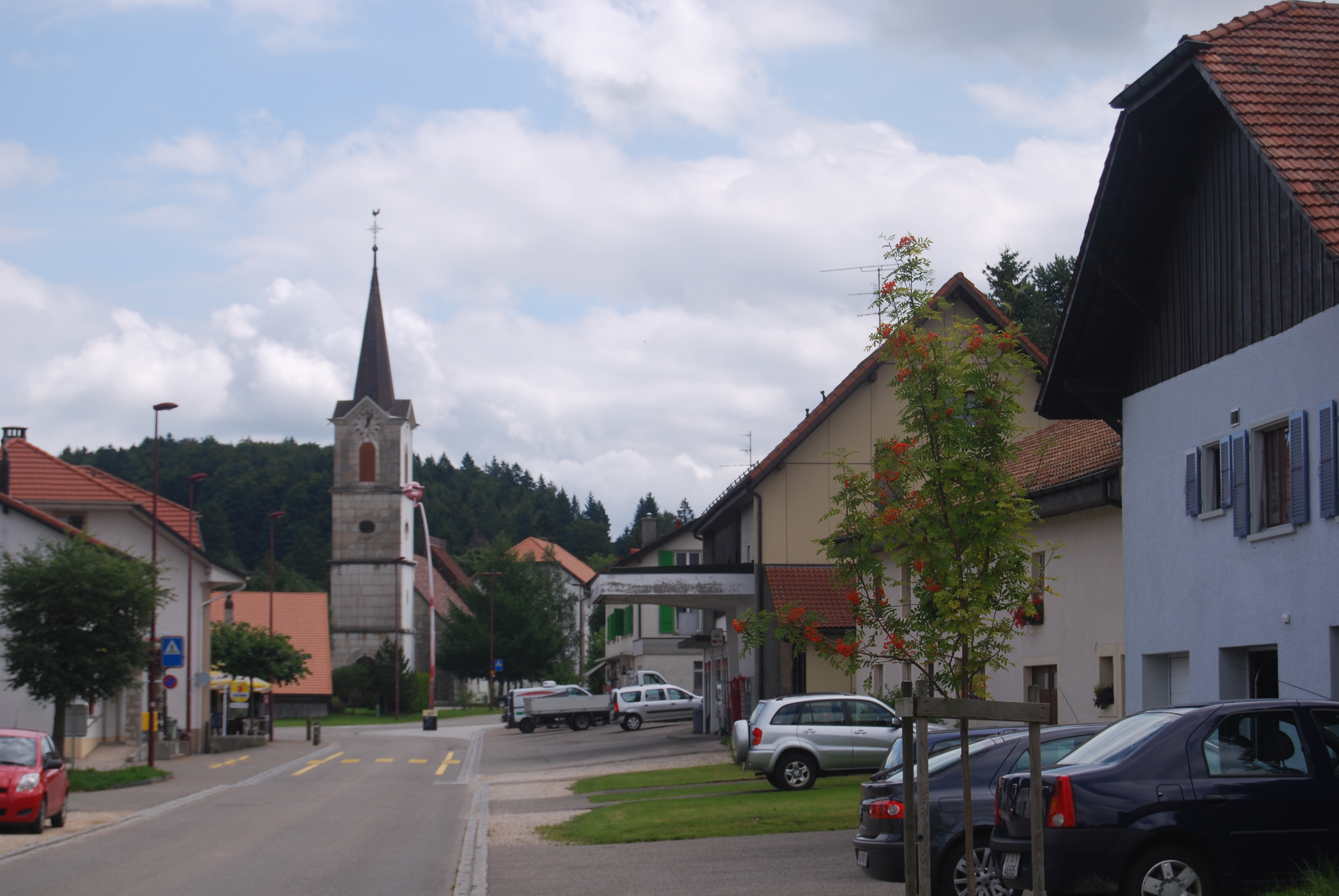
Village church of Lajoux

From the 2000 census, 473 or 78.1% were Roman Catholic, while 52 or 8.6% belonged to the Swiss Reformed Church. Of the rest of the population, there was 1 member of an Orthodox church, there was 1 individual who belongs to the Christian Catholic Church, and there were 44 individuals (or about 7.26% of the population) who belonged to another Christian church. 35 (or about 5.78% of the population) belonged to no church, are agnostic or atheist, and 22 individuals (or about 3.63% of the population) did not answer the question.

== Education ==
In Lajoux about 209 or (34.5%) of the population have completed non-mandatory upper secondary education, and 48 or (7.9%) have completed additional higher education (either university or a Fachhochschule). Of the 48 who completed tertiary schooling, 60.4% were Swiss men, 27.1% were Swiss women.

The Canton of Jura school system provides two year of non-obligatory Kindergarten, followed by six years of Primary school. This is followed by three years of obligatory lower Secondary school where the students are separated according to ability and aptitude. Following the lower Secondary students may attend a three or four year optional upper Secondary school followed by some form of Tertiary school or they may enter an apprenticeship.

During the 2009-10 school year, there were a total of 79 students attending 4 classes in Lajoux. There was one kindergarten class with a total of 15 students in the municipality. The municipality had 3 primary classes and 64 students. There are only nine Secondary schools in the canton, so all the students from Lajoux attend their secondary school in another municipality.

As of 2000, there were 13 students in Lajoux who came from another municipality, while 39 residents attended schools outside the municipality.
