= Le Peuchapatte =

- Former municipality
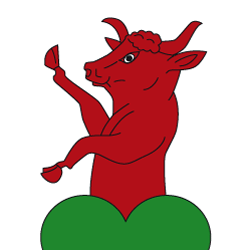
- Coat of arms
- Location of Le Peuchapatte
- Location within Switzerland Location within Canton of Jura
- Coordinates: 47°12′N 06°58′E
- Country: Switzerland
- Canton: Jura
- District: Franches-Montagnes

Area
  - Total: 2.57 km^{2} (0.99 sq mi)
- Elevation: 1,131 m (3,711 ft)

Population (2003)
  - Total: 40
  - Density: 16/km^{2} (40/sq mi)
- Time zone: UTC+01:00 (CET)
  - Summer (DST): UTC+02:00 (CEST)
- Postal code: 2345
- SFOS number: 523
- ISO 3166 code: CH-JU
- Surrounded by: Le Noirmont, Les Breuleux, Muriaux
- Website: SFSO statistics

Le Peuchapatte is a municipality in the district of Franches-Montagnes in the canton of Jura in Switzerland. On 1 January 2009, the formerly independent municipality of Le Peuchapatte merged into the municipality of Muriaux.
