= Richard Mille =

Swiss watch manufacturer

Coordinates: 47°12′41.3″N 7°00′04.2″E

Richard Mille Group
- Type: Private
- Industry: Luxury watchmaking
- Founded: 2001; 25 years ago
- Founder: Richard Mille; Dominique Guenat
- Headquarters: Les Breuleux (JU), Switzerland
- Area served: Worldwide
- Key people: Richard Mille, (Chairman/CEO)
- Products: Watches
- Production output: 4,800 (2018)
- Number of employees: 200–500
- Parent: Richard Mille Group
- Subsidiaries: Horométrie SA; Guenat SA Montres Valgine; ProArt; VMDH; Cercle d'Art
- Website: richardmille.com

Richard Mille is a Swiss luxury watchmaker founded in 2001 by Dominique Guenat and Richard Mille, based in Les Breuleux, Switzerland. The brand specialises in high-priced clockwork watches.

== Company history ==
After studying marketing in Besançon, Richard Mille (born 13 February 1951, Draguignan, France) started work at Finhor, a local watchmaking company in 1974. The company was bought by Matra in 1981, and Mille rose to manage Matra's watchmaking business, which then included the brands Yema and Cupillard Rième. Matra's watchmaking activities were sold to Seiko; Mille left in 1992 to start a watchmaking business for jewellery firm Mauboussin.

=== Development ===
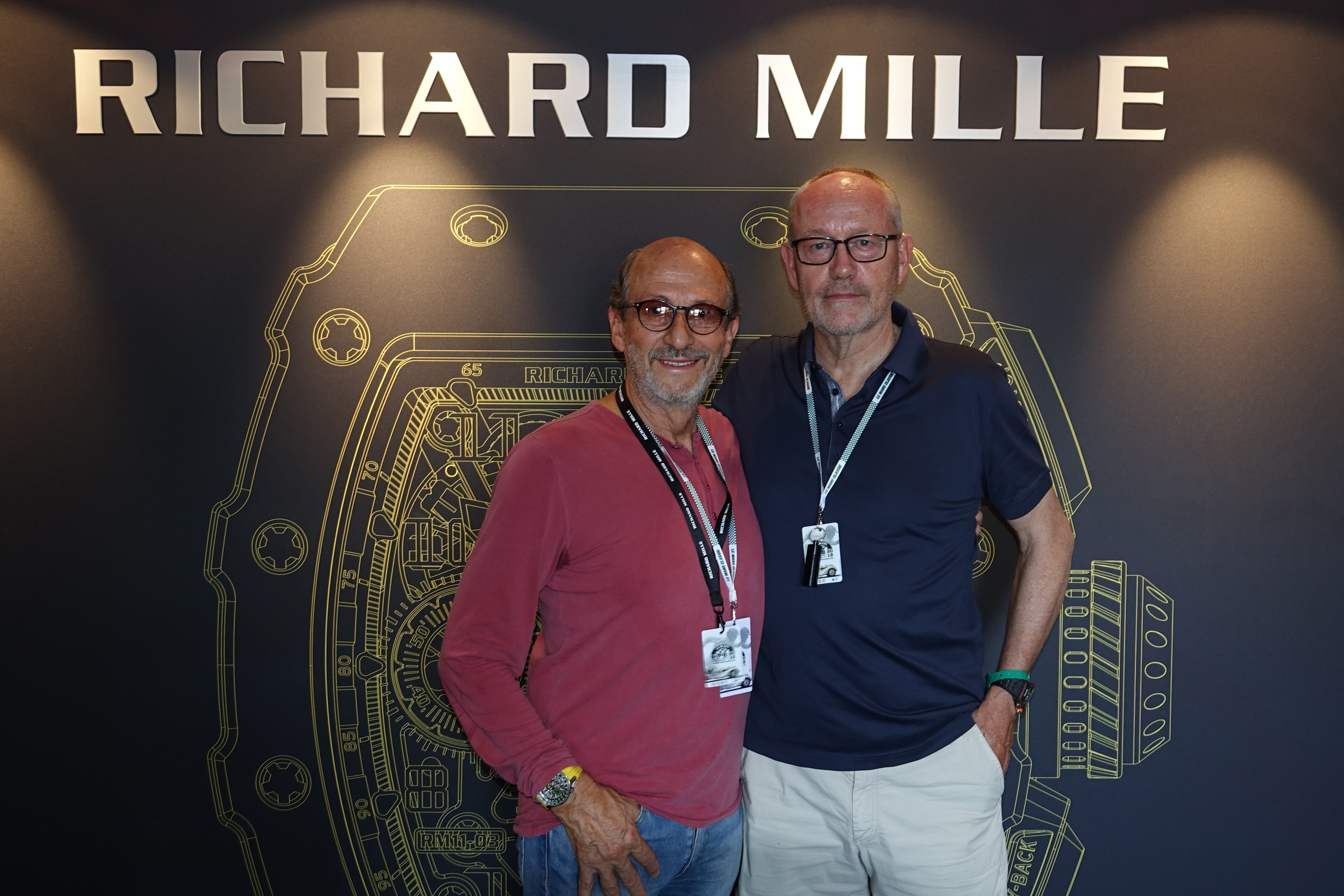
Richard Mille and Dominique Guenat, founders

Following a disagreement about commercial strategy at Mauboussin, where he was a shareholder, Richard Mille left his position as general manager to launch a range of watches. In late 1998, Mille presented his plans to his friend Dominique Guenat, owner of watchmaker Montres Valgine.

In early 1999, Richard Mille and Dominique Guenat drew up their plans for the Richard Mille brand in partnership with Montres Valgine and Swiss watchmaker Audemars Piguet. Over the next two years, they defined their brand concept and began designing watches. They then founded Horométrie, their operating company for the new Richard Mille brand as equal partners, which was registered in Switzerland by October 2001, and created the Richard Mille watchmaking brand in collaboration with Audemars Piguet, which then owned a stake in Richard Mille brand in 2007. After three years of research and prototypes, they exhibited their first watch, a manually-wound RM 001 Tourbillon, at the 2001 watch and jewellery exhibition Baselworld in Basel, Switzerland. The watch, which featured an exhibition caseback and visible parts, had a tourbillon calibre, a power-reserve indicator, and a torque indicator.

Richard Mille joined the Fondation de la Haute Horlogerie in 2007.

In April 2013, Richard Mille and Dominique Guenat acquired a 90% stake in Prototypes Artisanals SA, founded by Marco Poluzzi; former director Alain Varrin retained a 10% share. The company became ProArt and moved to a purpose-built 3,000 m² building in Les Breuleux. Following the sale of case supplier Donzé-Baume to Swiss luxury group Richemont in 2007, the Richard Mille company started machining its cases and some components, with ProArt as a subcontractor.

In 2013, Richard Mille turned down a proposal by the French group Kering to acquire a 51% stake.

In 2018, Richard Mille withdrew from the Salon international de la haute horlogerie in Geneva.

In late 2018 the RM 71-01 Automatic Tourbillon Talisman was launched, designed by women's collection director Cécile Guenat. It was described as being made by a woman for women.

== The Richard Mille Group ==
The Richard Mille Group comprises the following companies: Horométrie SA (distribution), Guenat SA Montres Valgine (conception and assembly), ProArt (components) and VMDH (decoration).

=== ProArt ===
Richard Mille watch cases and some movement components, such as baseplates, bridges, screws, and some wheels, are produced by ProArt, which belongs to the Richard Mille group.

=== VMDH ===
VMDH (Vital Morel Décalque Horlogère) is located in La Chaux-de-Fonds, Switzerland, 25 km from Les Breuleux. It specialises in transfers and the decoration of watch movement components (galvanoplasty, electroplating, etc.) VMDH produces the dials and flanges used by the Richard Mille and applies phosphorescent pigments.

== Technologies ==
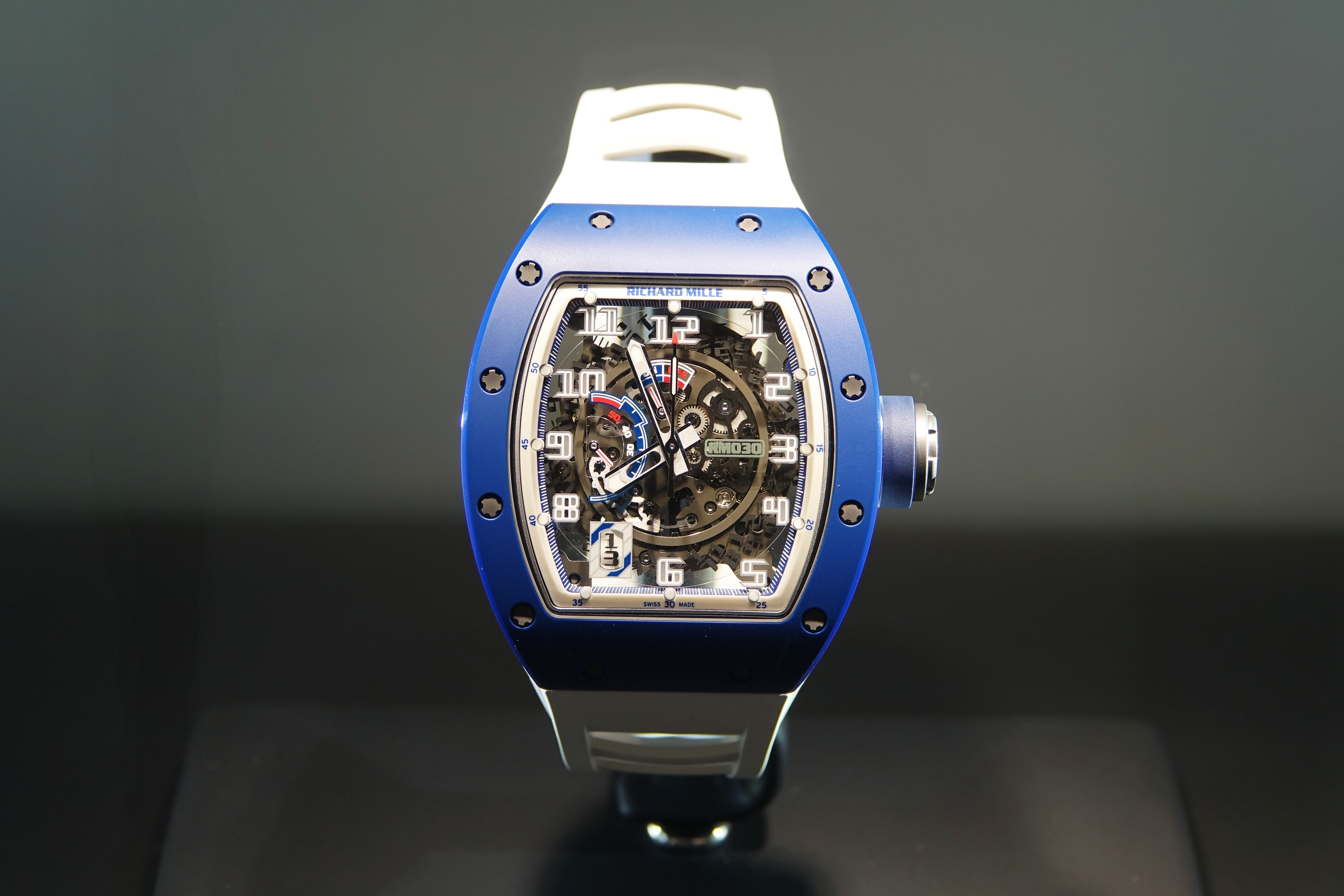
RM 030

Richard Mille teamed up with North Thin Ply Technology (NTPT), producer of lightweight pre-impregnated materials used in sailing and Formula 1, to produce the RM 27-02 Rafael Nadal in Carbon NTPT and Quartz TPT, and the RM 11-03 McLaren.

=== Technical innovation ===
- Development of gem-set ceramic
- Invention of laminated sapphire crystal (RM 53-01)
- Invention of new watch complications: Oracle (RM 069).
- Invention of the variable-geometry rotor.
- Invention of the declutchable rotor.
- Invention of Quartz TPT with the NTPT company.

=== Movement ===
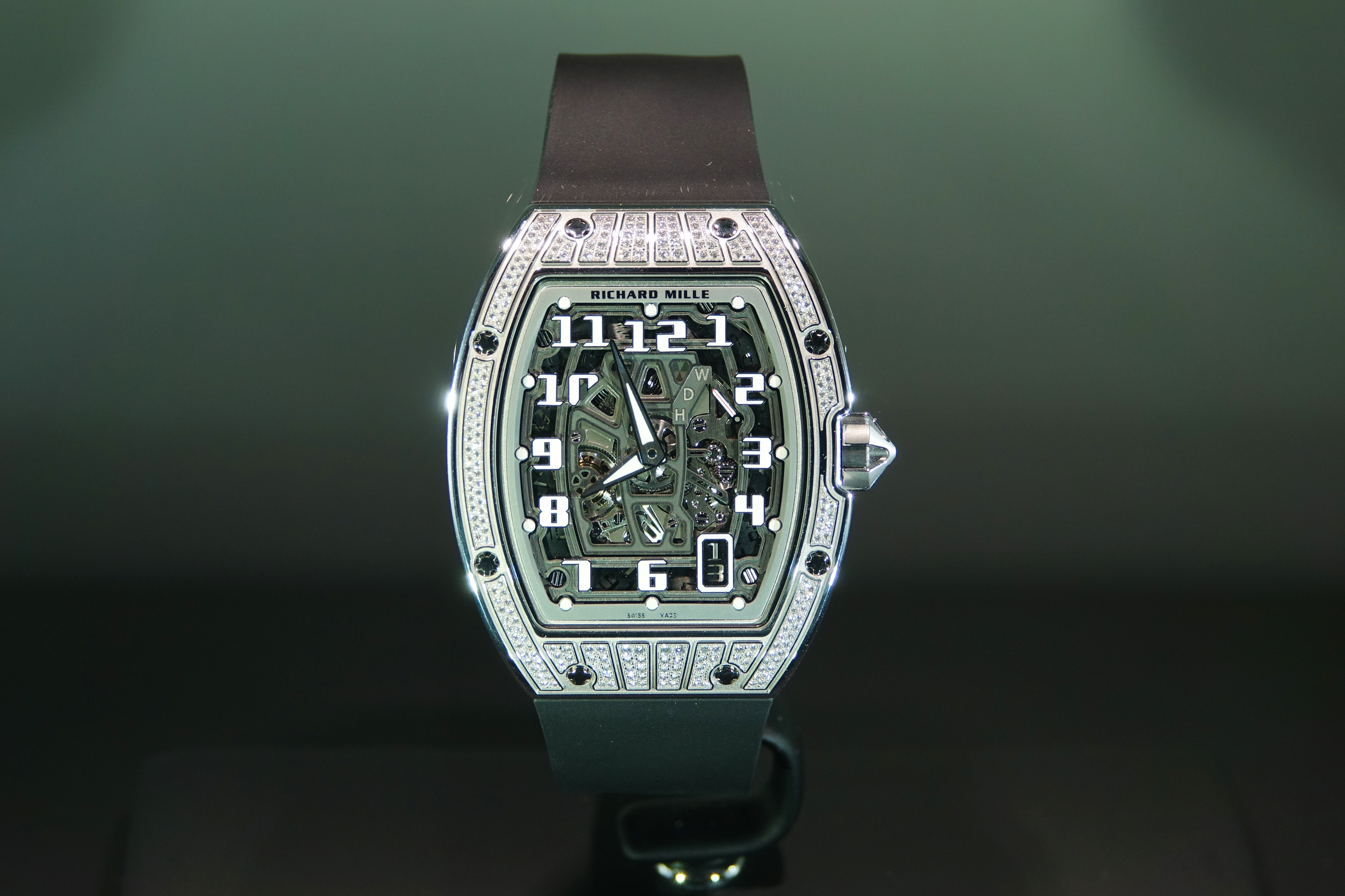
RM 67-01 Automatic Extra Flat

The brand has designed its own manufactured automatic calibres, including a whirlpool movement:

Name of the caliber	Richard Mille watch	Designation
CRMA1	RM037	First in-house automatic caliber with hours, minutes, big dates, and function selector.
CRMA2	RM 07-01 Black Ceramic	Automatic caliber with hours and minutes.
CRMA3	RM 63-01	Automatic caliber with hours, minutes, and twisting hours complication (Dizzy hands).
CRMA4	RM 63-02	Automatic caliber with hours, minutes, seconds, big dates, function selector, and universal time complication.
CRMA5	RM 07-02	Automatic gold calibre with hours and minutes.
CRMA6	RM 67-01 Automatic Extra Flat	Ultra-flat automatic caliber with hours, minutes, date, and function indicator.
CRMA7	RM 67-02 Sebastian Ogier Carbon TPT	Ultra-flat automatic caliber with hours and minutes.
CRMT1	RM 71-01	First in-house automatic tourbillon caliber with hours and minutes.

== Records ==
=== Accuracy of RM 031 ===
The RM 031 escapement beats at a frequency of 36,000 vibrations per hour, accurate to within 30 seconds per month. The RM 031 was limited to just 10 pieces.

=== Weight ===
In 2004, Richard Mille launched the RM 006 Felipe Massa Tourbillon, which weighed 48 grams excluding the strap, in 2005 the 29 g RM 009 Felipe Massa Tourbillon, and in 2007 the 20 g (including strap) RM 027 Rafael Nadal, with movement made from titanium and LITAL, a lithium alloy used in aeronautics that contains aluminium, copper, magnesium and zirconium.

In 2017, at the Salon international de la haute horlogerie (SIHH), the RM 50-03 McLaren F1 was exhibited, the world's lightest flyback chronograph at 38 g (including strap).

=== Shock-resistance ===
The RM 27-03 Tourbillon can withstand impacts of 10,000 g due to its skeletonised unibody baseplate made from Carbon TPT.

On 25 July 2009, during his Formula 1 accident in the qualifying stages of the 2009 Hungarian Grand Prix, Felipe Massa, one of the brand's "partners", was wearing an RM 006, which was undamaged.

== Projects ==
=== Quebec City Clock ===
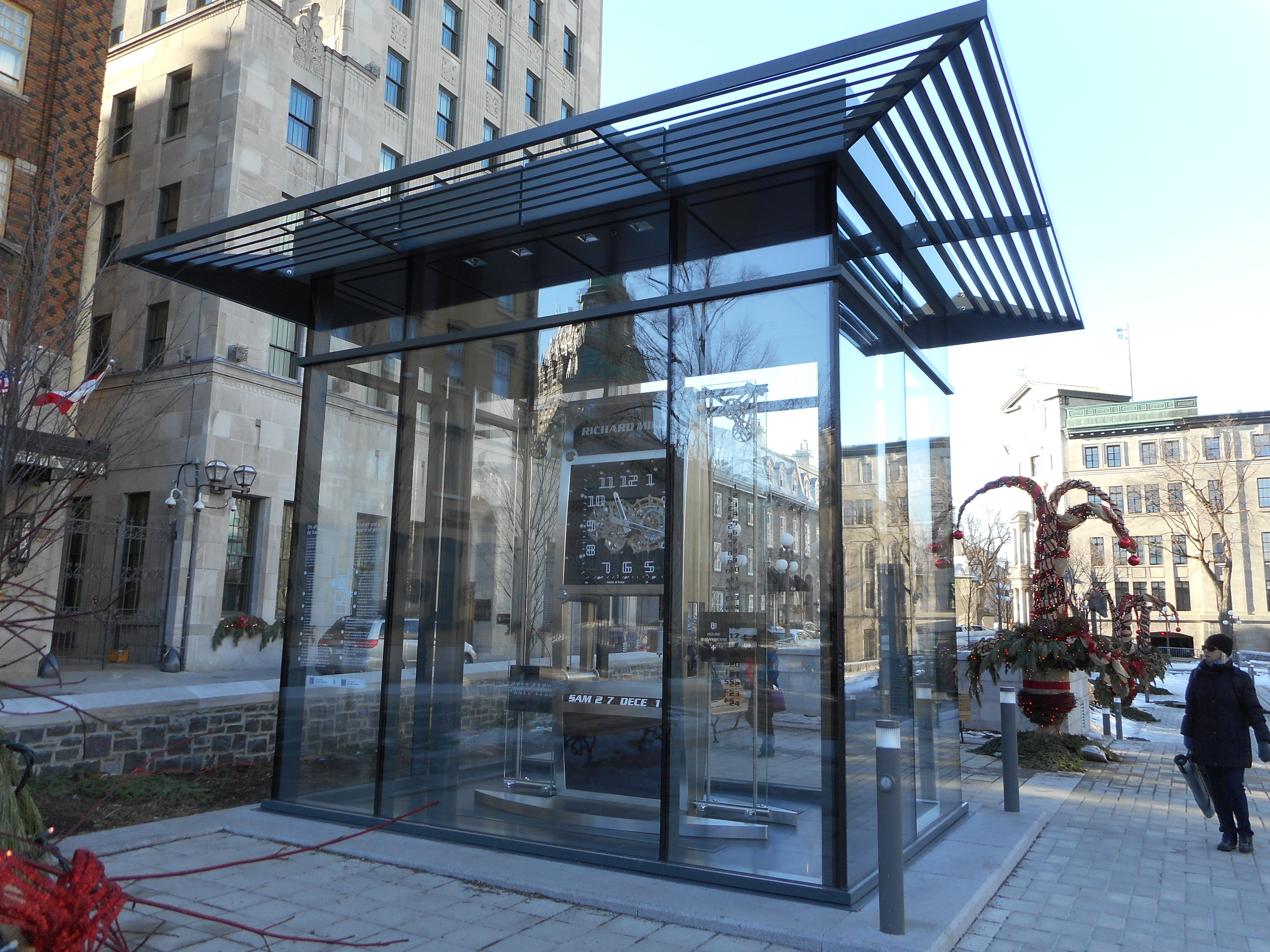
Porte-Bonheur Clock at Quebec City

The Porte-Bonheur Clock was presented to Quebec City by the Republic and Canton of Jura and the Richard Mille brand in 2014 to celebrate its 400th anniversary. From 2008 to 2014, the Richard Mille company, the technical college of Porrentruy (École des métiers techniques in Porrentruy), and the Neuchâtel Haute Ecole Arc developed and built the clock.

=== Starck and Only Watch ===
In 2005, Richard Mille and the French designer Philippe Starck made their first collaboration, producing a single "RM 005-1 Richard Mille by Philippe Stark", which was sold at auction in Monaco for €285,000, the highest price for an automatic watch at that time, for the benefit of the charity association Only Watch.

Mille and Starck made the extremely complex RM 011 Starck for Only Watch 2007, with a titanium "bangle" bracelet integrated into the case. The watch sold at auction for a new record €320,000 for the same charity.

=== Planetarium Tellurium ===
In 1998 Richard Mille met Stephen Forsey and Robert Greubel during an assignment for Mauboussin.

The Planetarium-Tellurium combines a precise gear train and barrel for the planetarium with a detent escapement, making it the most accurate clockwork planetarium-tellurium of its kind at the time.

== Sponsorship and endorsements ==
The brand sponsors various sportspeople and sports events, including the Le Mans Classic and Grand Prix de Pau auto races and the 'Voiles de Saint Barth' regatta.

=== Aircraft ===
In 2016 Richard Mille produced the "RM-50-02 ACJ Tourbillon Split Seconds Chronograph" in a 30-piece limited edition in collaboration with manufacturer Airbus Corporate Jets.

=== Sailing ===
In 2006, Richard Mille launched a partnership with Italian yacht manufacturer Perini Navi. The watch brand became the official timekeeper of the Perini Navi Cup. To mark this collaboration, it launched the RM 014 Tourbillon Perini Navi watch in 2006 and the RM 015 Tourbillon Perini Navi in 2007.

Richard Mille has been the main partner of «Les Voiles de Saint Barth» since 2010, with the "Richard Mille Maxi Cup".

In 2007, Ian Williams, a British sailor, won the third edition of the Monsoon Cup under the colors Richard Mille, last round of the World Match Racing Tour in Kuala Terengganu, Malaysia, and became World Match-Race Champion.

=== Cars and racing ===
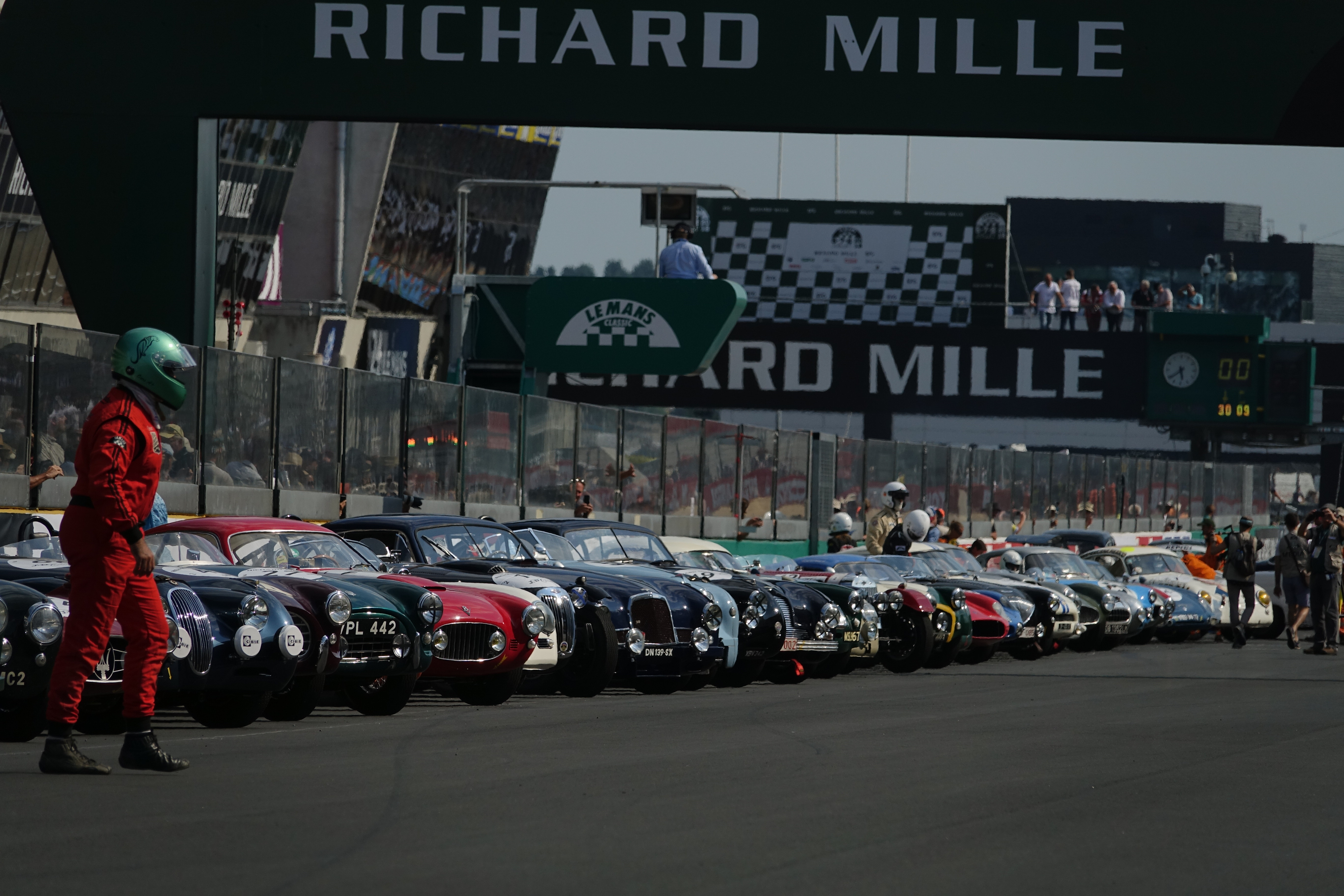
Le Mans Classic

Richard Mille is chairman of the Endurance Commission of the Fédération Internationale de l'Automobile (FIA).

The brand has always invested in automobile events, becoming in 2002 the partner of the Le Mans Classic.

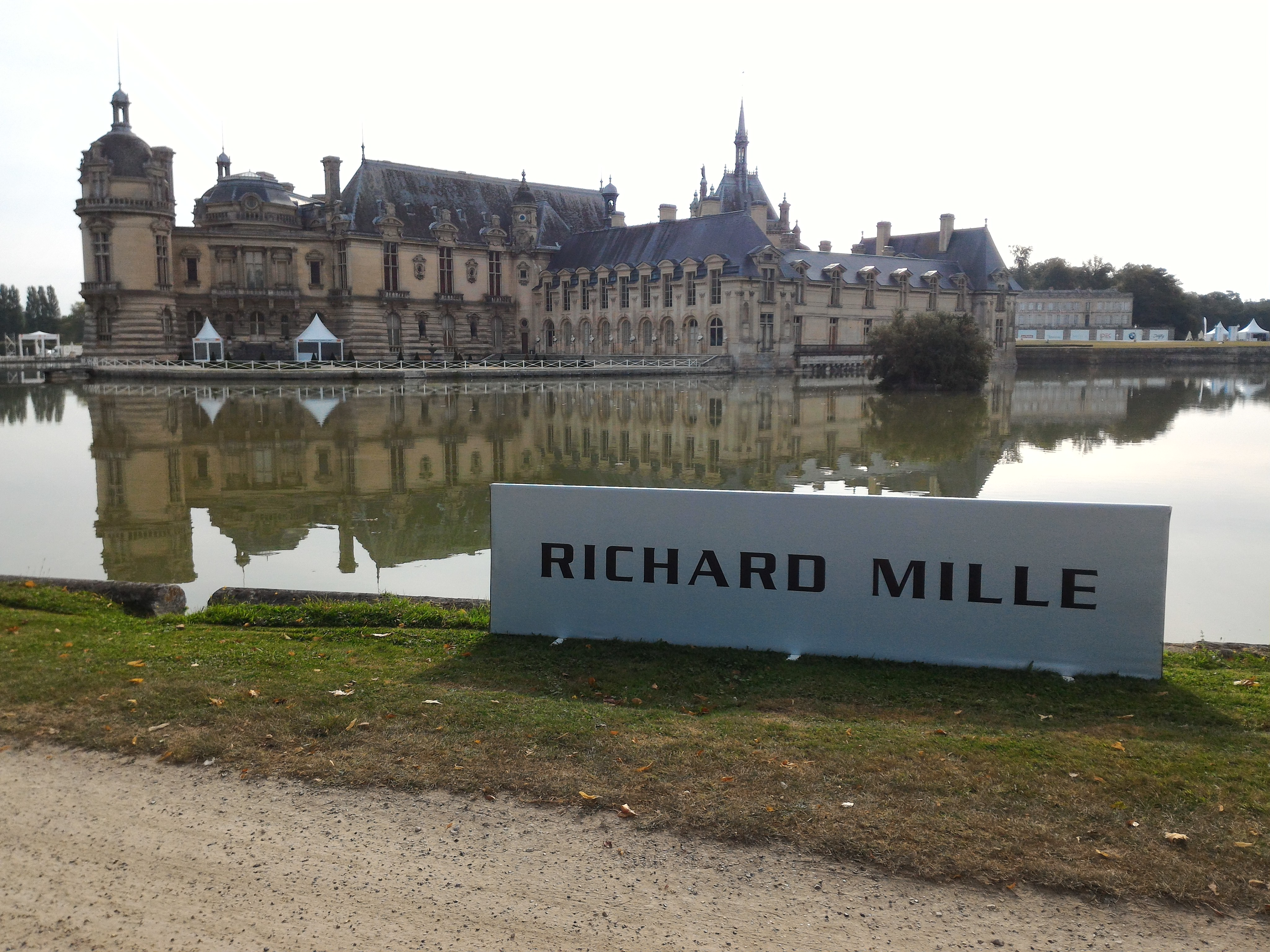
Chantilly Arts & Elegance Richard Mille

In 2014, Richard Mille, in association with Patrick Peter of Peter Auto, contributed to the creation of the Chantilly Arts & Elegance Richard Mille automotive elegance competition for classic cars.

The Richard Mille brand has teamed up with drivers from Formula 1 teams, including Alfa Romeo Racing, Haas F1 Team and McLaren Racing, and from Formula E (Nissan E-dams, Venturi Formula E). In 2021 Richard Mille replaced Hublot as a partner of Scuderia Ferrari.

In 2016, Richard Mille and McLaren Group signed a 10-year partnership agreement that covers Formula One team and automotive division and will run until 2025. The RM 11-03 McLaren Automatic Flyback Chronograph – a limited edition of 500 timepieces jointly designed by McLaren design director Rob Melville and Richard Mille engineer Fabrice Namura – is the first product to arise from this union. The 500 owners of the McLaren Senna car, the first model in McLaren's Ultimate Series, could order a watch with a number matching the chassis number of their car.

Also in 2017, the watch brand became an official partner of the Yas Marina Circuit in Abu Dhabi and of the Circuit Paul Ricard in Le Castellet in 2018, where the "Tour Chrono" (race display board) was designed by the Richard Mille teams.

In late 2018, Richard Mille announced a three-year partnership with Venturi, the team managed by Gildo Pastor in which Felipe Massa, the watch brand's historical partner, competes alongside teammate Edoardo Mortara. Richard Mille launched the "RM11 Felipe Massa Rose Gold and Titanium."

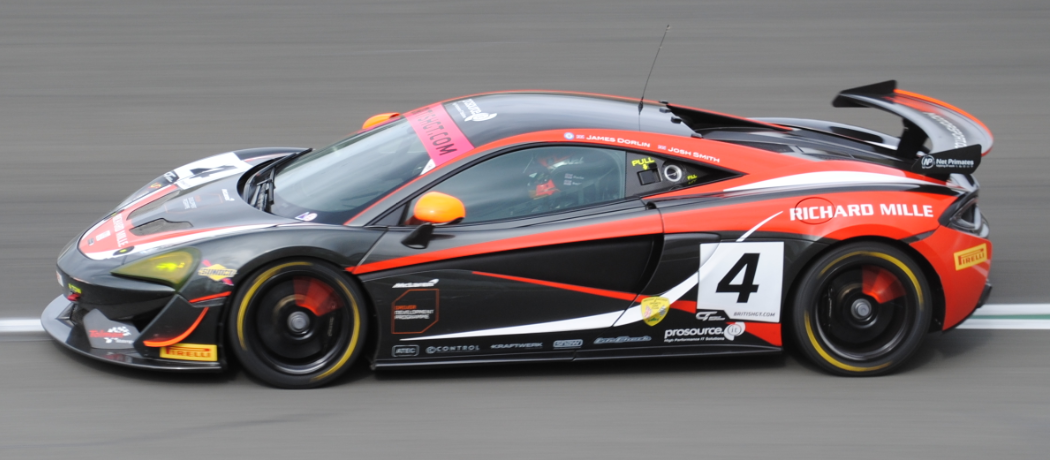
Tolman Motorsport's McLaren carry Richard Mille on their cars as sponsors.

In 2019, Tolman Motorsport ran a pair of McLaren 570S GT4s with Richard Mille as a sponsor.

The watch brand is also a partner of:

- The Spa Classic (in 2013), Belgium,
- The Suzuka Sound of Engine Richard Mille (since 2016),
- The Nürburgring Classic (since 2017),
- The Rallye des Princesses (since 2017),
- The Rallye des Légendes Richard Mille (since 2018),
- Rétromobile.

=== Other sports ===
Since 2010, Richard Mille has sponsored Rafael Nadal, the Spanish tennis player launching the "RM 27-03 Tourbillon Rafael Nadal" in 2017.

Since 2013, Richard Mille has sponsored the Open de France Dames golf tournament.

In May 2011, Richard Mille created the Richard Mille Polo Team composed of Prince Bahar of Brunei, British player Max Routledge and Argentines Pablo Mac Donough and Alejandro Muzzio.

In March 2026, Richard Mille has partnered with the Former UFC Lightweight Champion Ilia Topuria, he serves as the ambassador for the "RM 67-02".

== Criticism ==
Richard Mille has been criticised for creating "tasteless" watches and following the ugly sneaker trend. In 2021, American rapper Sean Combs described Richard Mille watches as "ugly" and likened them to Timex watches, saying he had two or three but never wore them.

In 2021, the magazine of watch reseller Chrono24 labelled Richard Mille watches as "not worth the hype," noting that one such wearer was robbed in Beverly Hills of the watch and suffered four gunshots and a trip to the hospital, and while such incidences were rare, they were another "unwanted aspect" of the watches.

== Bibliography ==
- Borer, Alain (2006). Richard Mille (in French). Vol. 1. Cercle d'art. p. 240. ISBN 978-2-7022-0762-8.
- Hottois, Gilbert (2009). Richard Mille, Individus techniques, individus humains (in French). Vol. 2. Cercle d'art. p. 200. ISBN 978-2-7022-0888-5.
- Monsel, Philippe; Diehl, Théodore; Treton-Monceyron, Mélanie (2013). Richard Mille: Monographie 1 (in French). Vol. 1. Cercle d'art. p. 488. ISBN 978-2-7022-0964-6.
- Mantoux, Aymeric (2017). Richard Mille: Monographie 2 (in French). Vol. 2. Cercle d'art. p. 521. ISBN 978-2-7022-1050-5.
