= Muriaux =

- Municipality
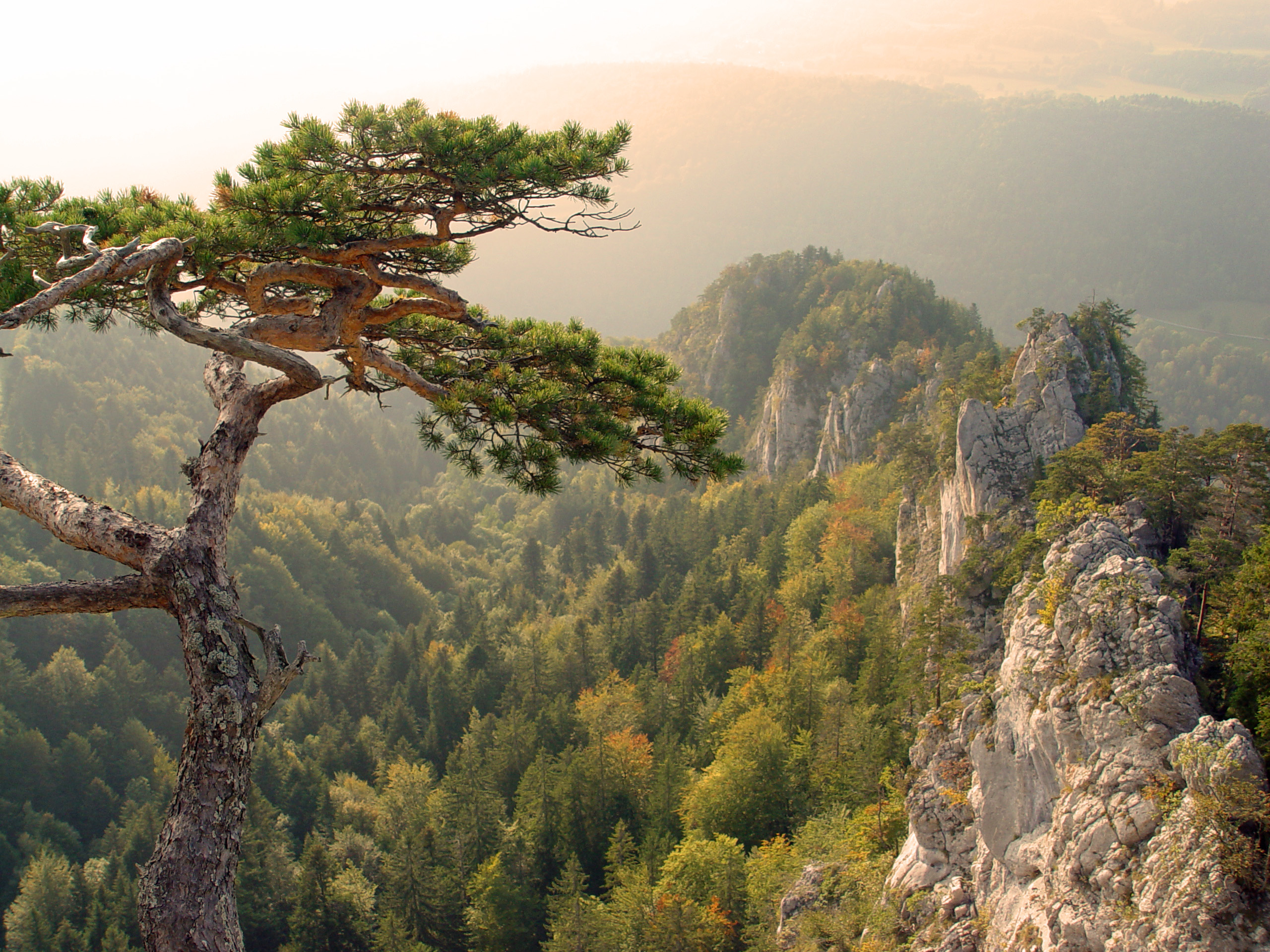
- Rocky peaks near the ruins of Spiegelberg by Muriaux village

- Flag Coat of arms
- Location of Muriaux
- Location within Switzerland Location within Canton of Jura
- Coordinates: 47°15′N 06°59′E
- Country: Switzerland
- Canton: Jura
- District: Franches-Montagnes

Government
  - Executive: Conseil communal with 5 members
  - Mayor: Maire; Nathalie Donzé (as of 2026)

Area
  - Total: 16.89 km^{2} (6.52 sq mi)
- Elevation: 947 m (3,107 ft)

Population (December 2020)
  - Total: 490
  - Density: 29/km^{2} (75/sq mi)
- Time zone: UTC+01:00 (CET)
  - Summer (DST): UTC+02:00 (CEST)
- Postal code: 2338
- SFOS number: 6753
- ISO 3166 code: CH-JU
- Surrounded by: Le Noirmont, Goumois, Les Pommerats, Saignelégier, La Chaux-des-Breuleux, Les Breuleux, Le Peuchapatte, Villeret (BE), Saint-Imier (BE)
- Website: muriaux.ch

Muriaux (French pronunciation: [myʁjo]) is a municipality in the district of Franches-Montagnes in the canton of Jura in Switzerland. On 1 January 2009, the formerly independent municipality of Le Peuchapatte merged into the municipality of Muriaux.

== History ==
Muriaux is first mentioned in 1301 as Murival. The municipality was formerly known by its German name Spiegelberg, however, that name is no longer used.

== Geography ==
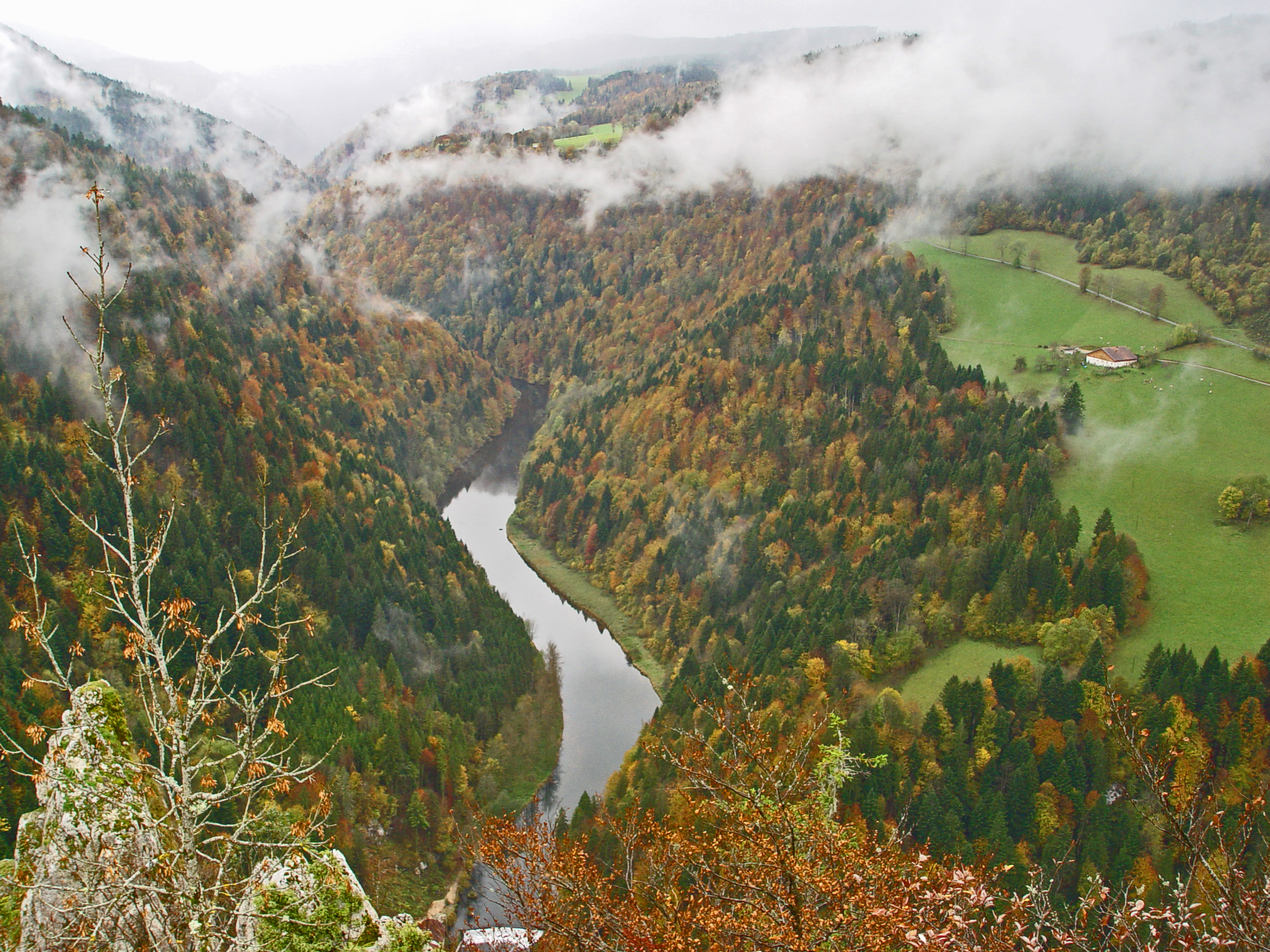
Doubs river near Muriaux

Muriaux has an area of 16.88 km^{2} (6.52 sq mi). Of this area, 10.22 km^{2} (3.95 mi^{2}) or 60.5% is used for agricultural purposes, while 6.1 km^{2} (2.4 mi^{2}) or 36.1% is forested. Of the rest of the land, 0.54 km^{2} (0.21 mi^{2}) or 3.2% is settled (buildings or roads) and 0.03 km^{2} (7.4 acres) or 0.2% is unproductive land.

Of the built up area, housing and buildings made up 1.5% and transportation infrastructure made up 1.6%. Out of the forested land, 31.4% of the total land area is heavily forested and 4.7% is covered with orchards or small clusters of trees. Of the agricultural land, 5.7% is used for growing crops and 33.9% is pastures and 20.8% is used for alpine pastures.

The widely scattered settlements of municipality are located in the Franches-Montagnes district. It consists of the village of Muriaux west of the Saignelégier-Le Noirmont road, the hamlets of Les Emibois, Les Chenevières, Le Roselet, the exclave of Le Cerneux-Veusil between the municipalities of Saint-Imier and Les Breuleux and the former municipality of Le Peuchapatte.

The municipalities of Le Bémont, Les Bois, Les Breuleux, La Chaux-des-Breuleux, Les Enfers, Les Genevez, Lajoux, Montfaucon, Muriaux, Le Noirmont, Saignelégier, Saint-Brais and Soubey are considering a merger on at a date in the future into the new municipality of Franches-Montagnes.

== Coat of arms ==
The blazon of the municipal coat of arms is Or, a Roundel Argent bordered Gules, in base triple steep Mountain Peaks Vert.

== Demographics ==
Muriaux has a population (as of December 2020) of 490. As of 2008, 4.6% of the population are resident foreign nationals. Over the last 10 years (2000–2010) the population has changed at a rate of 1.2%. Migration accounted for 0.4%, while births and deaths accounted for 2%.

Most of the population (as of 2000) speaks French (392 or 91.2%) as their first language, German is the second most common (32 or 7.4%) and Italian is the third (2 or 0.5%). There is 1 person who speaks Romansh.

As of 2008, the population was 51.3% male and 48.7% female. The population was made up of 244 Swiss men (49.3% of the population) and 10 (2.0%) non-Swiss men. There were 228 Swiss women (46.1%) and 13 (2.6%) non-Swiss women. Of the population in the municipality, 156 or about 36.3% were born in Muriaux and lived there in 2000. There were 123 or 28.6% who were born in the same canton, while 92 or 21.4% were born somewhere else in Switzerland, and 44 or 10.2% were born outside of Switzerland.

As of 2000, children and teenagers (0–19 years old) make up 26.1% of the population, while adults (20–64 years old) make up 60.5% and seniors (over 64 years old) make up 13.5%.

As of 2000, there were 185 people who were single and never married in the municipality. There were 209 married individuals, 18 widows or widowers and 18 individuals who are divorced.

As of 2000, there were 179 private households in the municipality, and an average of 2.6 persons per household. There were 39 households that consist of only one person and 18 households with five or more people. In 2000, a total of 151 apartments (77.4% of the total) were permanently occupied, while 37 apartments (19.0%) were seasonally occupied and 7 apartments (3.6%) were empty. The vacancy rate for the municipality, in 2010, was 0.9%.

The historical population is given in the following chart:

== Sights ==
The entire village of Muriaux is designated as part of the Inventory of Swiss Heritage Sites.

=== Motor Museum ===
The small motor museum closed in 2008 although the collection on which it was based remains in place.

== Politics ==
In the 2007 federal election the most popular party was the FDP which received 26.5% of the vote. The next three most popular parties were the SPS (20.23%), the CSP (19.66%) and the SVP (18.23%). In the federal election, a total of 182 votes were cast, and the voter turnout was 48.7%.

== Economy ==
The economy is based on dairy farming and cattle breeding. There are few other sources of employment in the village.

As of 2010, Muriaux had an unemployment rate of 2.1%. As of 2008, there were 96 people employed in the primary economic sector and about 36 businesses involved in this sector. 5 people were employed in the secondary sector and there were 4 businesses in this sector. 49 people were employed in the tertiary sector, with 12 businesses in this sector. There were 241 residents of the municipality who were employed in some capacity, of which females made up 41.9% of the workforce.

In 2008 the total number of full-time equivalent jobs was 104. The number of jobs in the primary sector was 59, all of which were in agriculture. The number of jobs in the secondary sector was 5, all of which were in manufacturing. The number of jobs in the tertiary sector was 40. In the tertiary sector; 27 or 67.5% were in wholesale or retail sales or the repair of motor vehicles, 2 or 5.0% were in the movement and storage of goods, 7 or 17.5% were in a hotel or restaurant, and 1 was a technical professional or scientist.

In 2000, there were 67 workers who commuted into the municipality and 130 workers who commuted away. The municipality is a net exporter of workers, with about 1.9 workers leaving the municipality for every one entering. About 16.4% of the workforce coming into Muriaux are coming from outside Switzerland. Of the working population, 3.4% used public transportation to get to work, and 57.8% used a private car.

== Transport ==
The municipality has two railway stations, Muriaux and Les Emibois, on the La Chaux-de-Fonds–Glovelier line.

== Religion ==
From the 2000 census, 278 or 64.7% were Roman Catholic, while 82 or 19.1% belonged to the Swiss Reformed Church. Of the rest of the population, there were 24 individuals (or about 5.58% of the population) who belonged to another Christian church. There were 1 individual who belonged to another church. 36 (or about 8.37% of the population) belonged to no church, are agnostic or atheist, and 21 individuals (or about 4.88% of the population) did not answer the question.

== Education ==
In Muriaux about 138 or (32.1%) of the population have completed non-mandatory upper secondary education, and 47 or (10.9%) have completed additional higher education (either university or a Fachhochschule). Of the 47 who completed tertiary schooling, 61.7% were Swiss men, 21.3% were Swiss women, 10.6% were non-Swiss men.

The Canton of Jura school system provides two year of non-obligatory Kindergarten, followed by six years of Primary school. This is followed by three years of obligatory lower Secondary school where the students are separated according to ability and aptitude. Following the lower Secondary students may attend a three or four year optional upper Secondary school followed by some form of Tertiary school or they may enter an apprenticeship.

During the 2009–10 school year, there were no students attending school in Muriaux.

As of 2000, there were 9 students in Muriaux who came from another municipality, while 54 residents attended schools outside the municipality.
