= Goumois =

- Former municipality
- Location of Goumois
- Location within Switzerland Location within Canton of Jura
- Coordinates: 47°16′N 06°57′E
- Country: Switzerland
- Canton: Jura
- District: Franches-Montagnes

Area
  - Total: 8.54 km^{2} (3.30 sq mi)
- Elevation: 493 m (1,617 ft)

Population (2003)
  - Total: 99
  - Density: 12/km^{2} (30/sq mi)
- Time zone: UTC+01:00 (CET)
  - Summer (DST): UTC+02:00 (CEST)
- Postal code: 2354
- SFOS number: 518
- ISO 3166 code: CH-JU
- Surrounded by: Les Pommerats, Muriaux, Le Noirmont, Charmauvillers, Goumois(F), Fessevillers(F)
- Website: SFSO statistics

Goumois (French pronunciation: [ɡumwa]) was a municipality in the district of Franches-Montagnes in the canton of Jura in Switzerland. On 1 January 2009, the formerly independent municipalities of Goumois and Les Pommerats merged into Saignelégier.
