= Les Pommerats =

- Former municipality
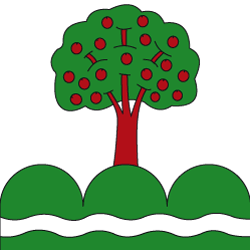
- Coat of arms
- Location of Les Pommerats
- Location within Switzerland Location within Canton of Jura
- Coordinates: 47°16′N 06°59′E
- Country: Switzerland
- Canton: Jura
- District: Franches-Montagnes

Area
  - Total: 11.51 km^{2} (4.44 sq mi)
- Elevation: 899 m (2,949 ft)

Population (2003)
  - Total: 247
  - Density: 21.5/km^{2} (55.6/sq mi)
- Time zone: UTC+01:00 (CET)
  - Summer (DST): UTC+02:00 (CEST)
- Postal code: 2353
- SFOS number: 524
- ISO 3166 code: CH-JU
- Surrounded by: Goumois, Muriaux, Saignelégier, Le Bémont, Les Enfers, Soubey, Indevillers(F)
- Website: SFSO statistics

Les Pommerats (French pronunciation: [le pɔmʁa]) is a municipality in the district of Franches-Montagnes in the canton of Jura in Switzerland. On 1 January 2009, the formerly independent municipalities of Goumois and Les Pommerats merged into Saignelégier.
