= Le Mans Classic =

Biennial French vintage sports car event

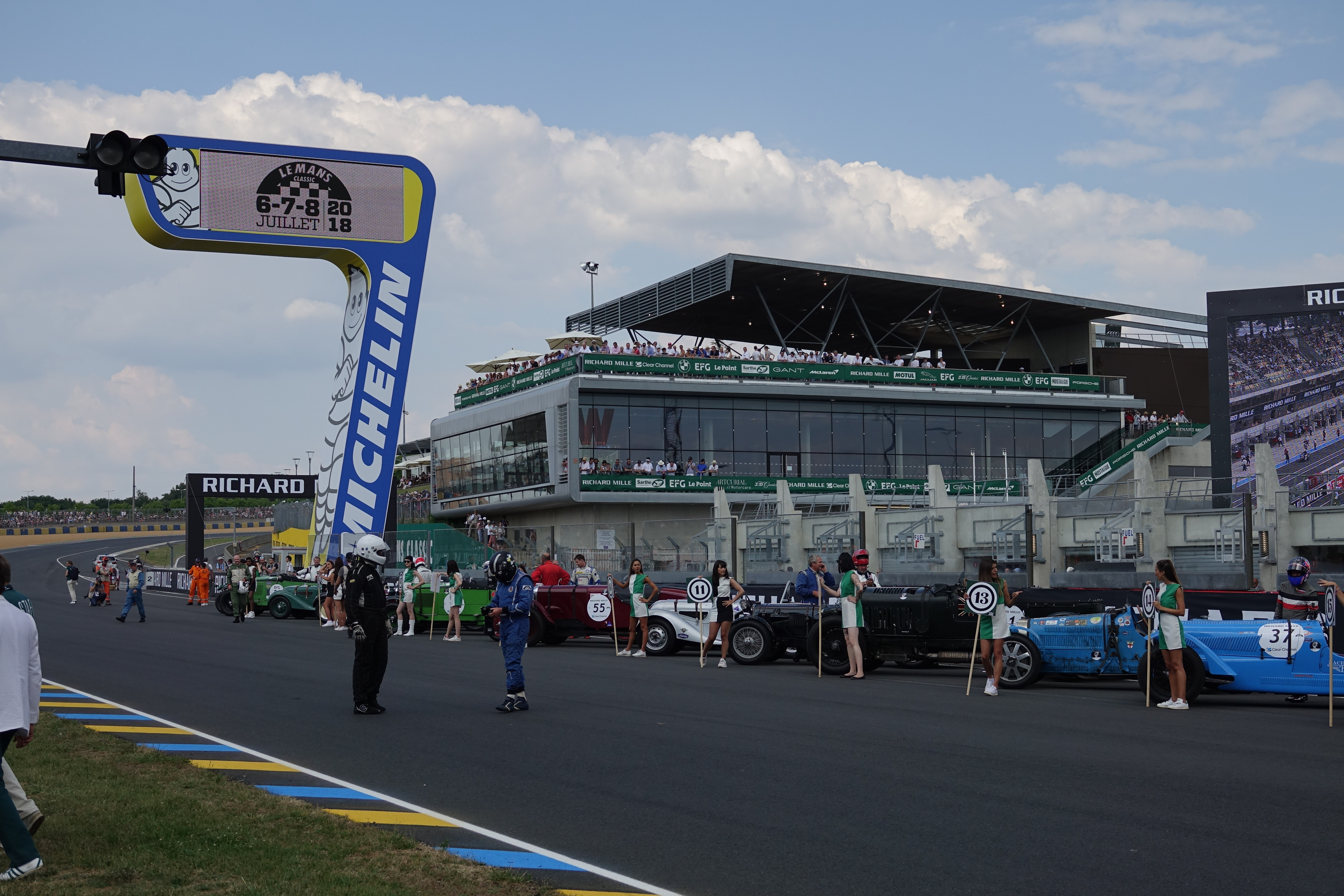
Cars at Le Mans Classic 2018

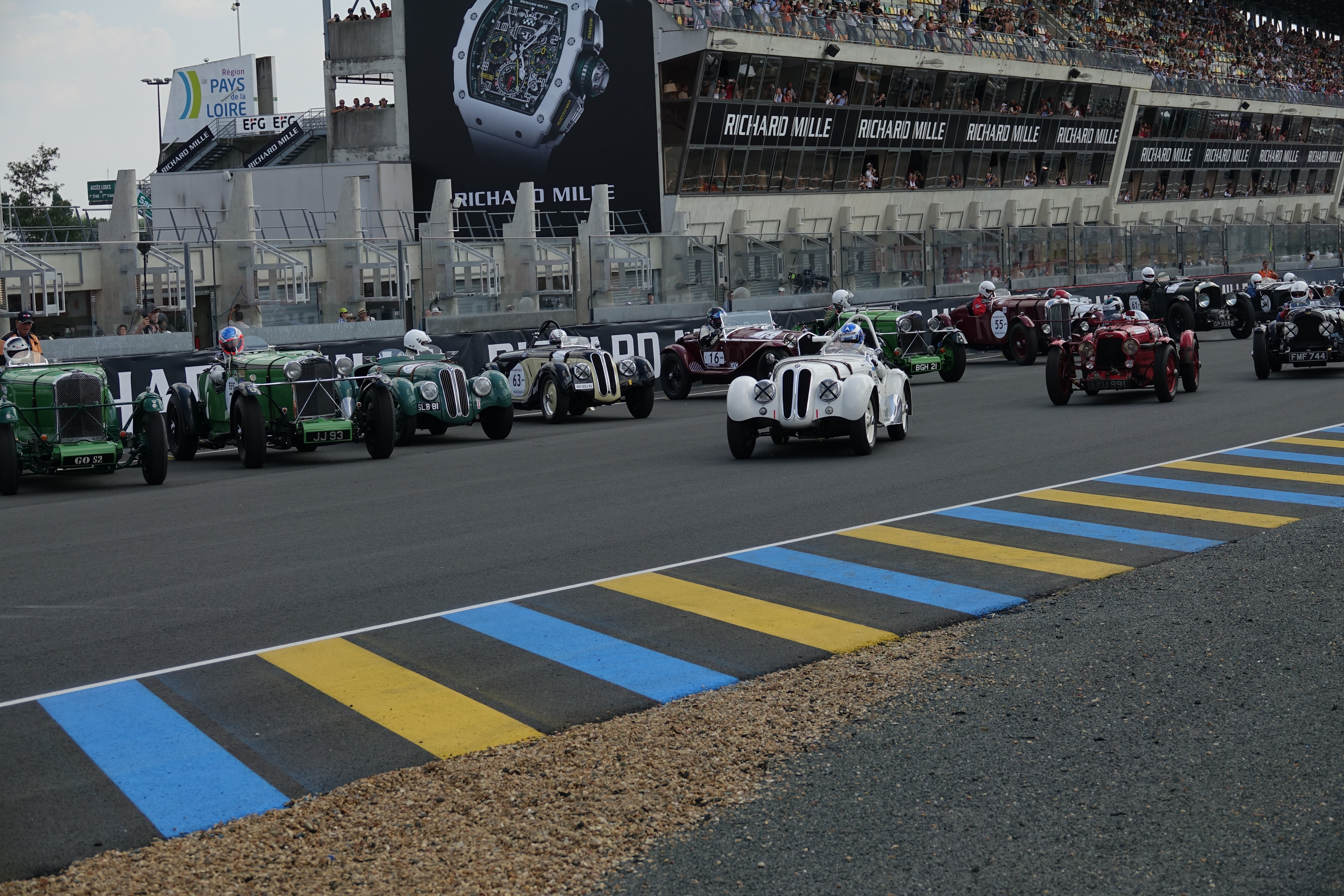
Le Mans Start at Le Mans Classic 2018

The Le Mans Classic is a vintage sports car event held on the grounds of the 24 Hours of Le Mans, created by Peter Auto and Richard Mille, and associated with Automobile Club de l'Ouest (ACO). It began in 2002 and ran every two years in July on the full 13.65 km circuit also used for the annual modern day 24 Hours of Le Mans. The event is split, starting in 2025, based on 50 years determining which classes will be used, as the event will become annual. Le Mans Classic Heritage (which will encompass the original classifications up to 1975, in odd numbered years) and Le Mans Classic Legend (which will encompass classes since 1976, in even numbered years).

The Le Mans Classic event of 2002 was the first time since 1923 that the full 24-hour Circuit, part of which is public road the rest of the year, was closed specifically for an event other than the annual running of the 24 heures du Mans with contemporary sports cars and prototypes. To compete in the races a driver must own an FIA International Competition licence.

The event consists of a series of races for cars which have competed at the 24 Hours of Le Mans or for similar cars of the same model. The traditional classes feature cars from prior to 1981 (originally 1979, but 1981 was the last year of the formula), with all cars being broken into six different eras. In recent years, three new classes from event organisers have been added by Peter Auto, to reflect the history of the event.

Car shows and auctions are hosted on the Bugatti Circuit grounds, with various car clubs meeting to show off machinery.

== Car classes ==
Each class of car competes separately on the full 13.65 km Circuit de la Sarthe (traditional circuit of Le Mans race). The classes are divided by era in an attempt to equalize the pace of the cars in each event. The current classes for Heritage are:

1. 1923–1939 (pre-WWII)
2. 1949–1956
3. 1957–1961
4. 1962–1966
5. 1967–1975

The current classes for Legend are:

1. 1976–1982
2. 1983–1993 Group C
3. 1994–2000 (GT Cars)
4. 2001–2005 (prototypes) or 2001–2010 LM GTE
5. 2006–2012 (prototypes) and 2011–2020 (GTE)

Although the ruleset states 2015 for the final Legend class, any car up to 2020 in Prototype and 2023 for GTE will be eligible, as the cars were retired at the end of the 2020 FIA WEC season in prototypes and 2023 for GTE cars. Some cars used in 2015 were eligible to 2023. Support races for retired GT3 cars whose homologation expired and NASCAR race cars up to 2021 will be offered. The Le Mans Classic will be associated with NASCAR Holdings' Historic Sportscar Racing, whose sportscars will be offered in the Le Mans Classic Legend, along with historic (Gen 6 and prior) NASCAR national series race cars.

== Le Mans Classic Japan ==
Beginning in 2005, the SERO organization launched the Le Mans Classic Japan event, meant to run in alternative years from the event in France. The initial event was held at the Mine Circuit, while in 2007 it moved to the Fuji Speedway where it was part of the Japan Le Mans Challenge event.

Drivers and cars are required to fit the same qualifications as their French counterparts, meaning cars are broken into eras and drivers require competition licenses.

== Previous winners ==
=== 2008 ===
In 2008, six classes competed in separate races. The first class was won by a Talbot 105 driven by Gareth Burnett and Julian Bronson. Class 2 was won by a Jaguar C-Type driven by Vary Paerson and Nigel Webb, while Class 3 featured the same drivers winning in a D-Type, although this was based on laps total. A Saab 93 driven by Fredrik Tornérhielm, Bo Lindman and Göran Dahlén won the class based on adjusted performance and came second in total. A Ford GT40 driven by Christian Glasel won Class 4 and Olivier Cazalier's Ferrari 512S won Class 5. The final class was won by a Porsche 936 driven by Jean-Marc Luco and Jürgen Barth.

=== 2010 ===
In 2010, the first class was won by a BMW 328 driven by Albert Otten. Class 2 was won by a Jaguar D-Type driven by Peter Neumark and JS Baxter, and Class 3 by the Maserati Tipo 61 Birdcage driven by Willi Balz and Frank Stippler. Class 4 saw Christian Glasel repeat his 2008 success in a Ford GT40, whilst Class 5 was won by a Lola T70 Mk III of Bernard Thuner. Finally, Class 6 saw Jean-Marc Luco win again in a Porsche 936, this time partnered by Jacques Nicolet.

=== 2012 ===
In 2012, the first class was won by a Talbot Lago driven by C. Traber and B. Trenery. Class 2 was won by a Jaguar D-Type driven by G. Pickering, and Class 3 by the Lotus 15 driven by Wills, Twyman and Pirro. Class 4 was won by L. Voyazides & R. D'Abel De Libran in a Ford GT40, whilst Class 5 was won again by the Lola T70 Mk III of Bernard Thuner. Finally, Class 6 saw C. MacAllister win in a Gulf Mirage.

=== 2014 ===
In 2014, the first class was won by a Talbot 105 driven by Michael Birch & Gareth Burnett. Class 2 & 3 were both won by a Jaguar D-Type driven by Gary Pearson & Chris Harris. Class 4 was won by Hans Hugenholtz in a Ford GT40, whilst Class 5 was won by the Lola T70 Mk III of David Hart. Finally, Class 6 saw C. MacAllister win again in a Gulf Mirage.

=== 2016 ===
In 2016, the first class was won by a Talbot Lago driven by Christian Traber & Spencer Trenery. Class 2 was won by a Jaguar D-Type driven by Andy Wallace and Class 3 by Chris Ward-Lister in a Costin. Class 4 was won by Shaun Lynn in a Ford GT40, whilst Class 5 was won by the Lola T70 Mk III of Bernard Thuner. Finally, Class 6 saw Ulrich Schumacher & Marco Werner win in a Porsche 936.

=== 2018 ===
In 2018, the first class was won by a Talbot AV105 driven by 2014 winners Michael Birch & Gareth Burnett. Class 2 was won by a Jaguar D-Type driven by Niklas Halusa & Lukas Halusa and Class 3 by Andy Wallace in another D-Type Jaguar. Class 4 was won by Diogo Ferrao in a Ford GT40, whilst Class 5 was won by the Ford GT40 of Philippe Scemama. Finally, Class 6 saw Stephen Dance win in a Ford Capri RS 2600.

=== 2023 ===
Record edition, which celebrated the Centenary of the 24 Hours of Le Mans, bringing together almost 235,000 visitors.

=== 2025 ===
3 to 6 July 2025

=== 2026 ===
The new Le Mans Classic Legend division for cars from the past 50 years debuts for the 2 to 5 July 2026 event. The traditional Le Mans Classic for cars older than 50 years will be held in 2027. Of note, Historic Sportscar Racing will be a support class.

Kurt Busch will drive his restored 2020 South Point 400 race winner, now reconfigured for circuit racing, in front of spectators (that race was run behind closed doors), with a special tribute to his brother Kyle, who died days after Kurt announced his intent to drive his hometown race winning car at Le Mans, by renumbering the No. 1 car with his brother's trademarked No. 8.
