= Les Emibois railway station =

Railway station in Muriaux, Switzerland

Les Emibois
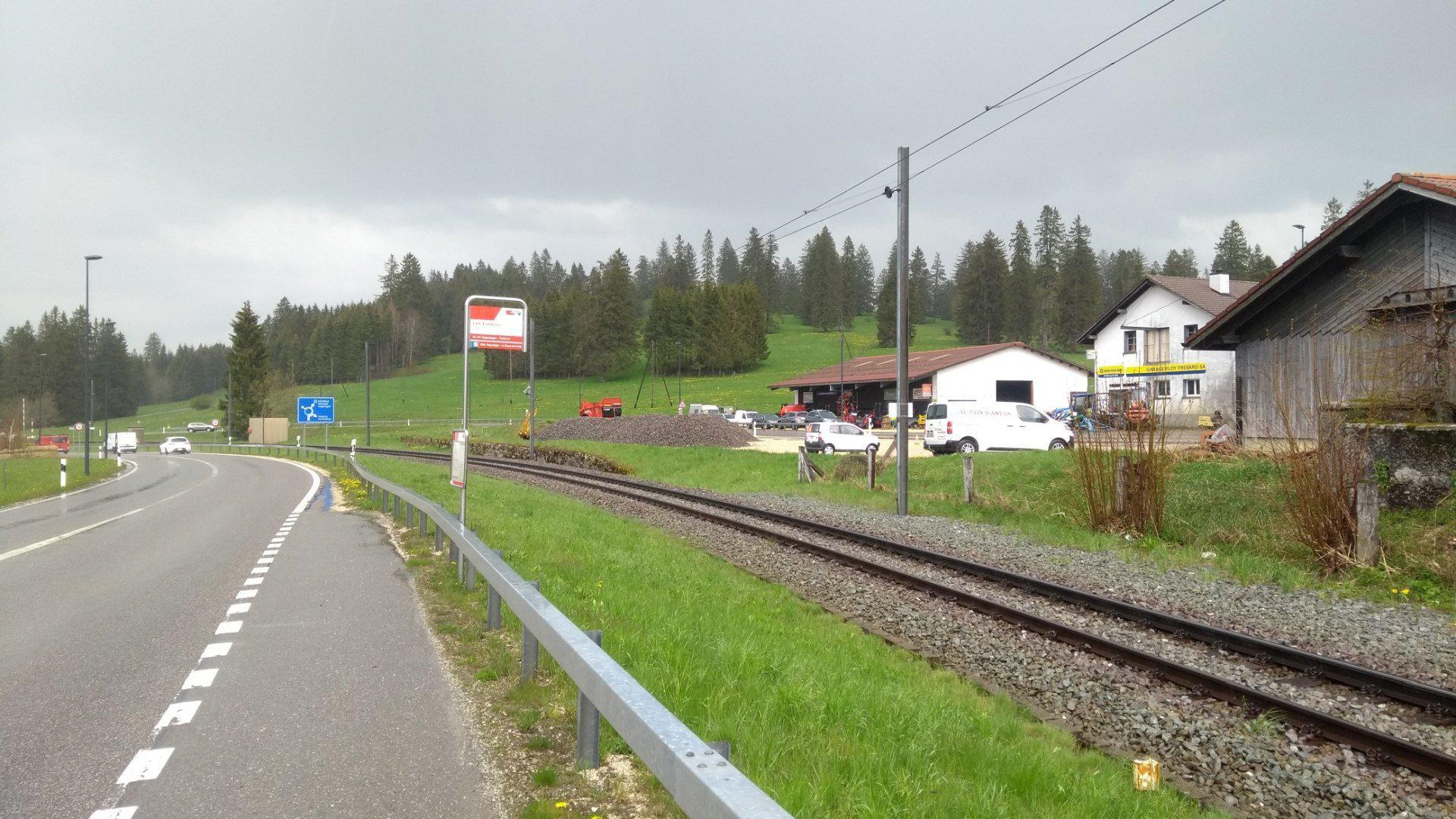
- The former stopping location in 2019

General information
- Location: Muriaux, Jura; Switzerland
- Coordinates: 47°13′55″N 6°59′06″E
- Elevation: 954 m (3,130 ft)
- Owner: Chemins de fer du Jura
- Line: La Chaux-de-Fonds–Glovelier line
- Distance: 2.4 km (1.5 mi) from Le Noirmont
- Platforms: 1 side platform
- Tracks: 1
- Train operators: Chemins de fer du Jura

Construction
- Accessible: Yes

Other information
- Station code: 8500190 (EMI)
- Fare zone: 42 (Onde Verte and Vagabond)

Services
Preceding station	Chemins de fer du Jura	Following station
Le Noirmont towards La Chaux-de-Fonds	R36	Muriaux towards Glovelier
Location
- Location within Switzerland Location within Canton of Jura

Les Emibois railway station (French: Gare des Emibois) is a railway station in the municipality of Muriaux, in the Swiss canton of Jura. It is an intermediate stop and a request stop on the 1,000 mm (3 ft 3 3/8 in) metre gauge La Chaux-de-Fonds–Glovelier line of the Chemins de fer du Jura.

== Services ==
As of the December 2023 timetable change, the following services stop at Les Emibois:

- Regio: hourly service between La Chaux-de-Fonds and Glovelier.
