= Saignelégier =

- Municipality
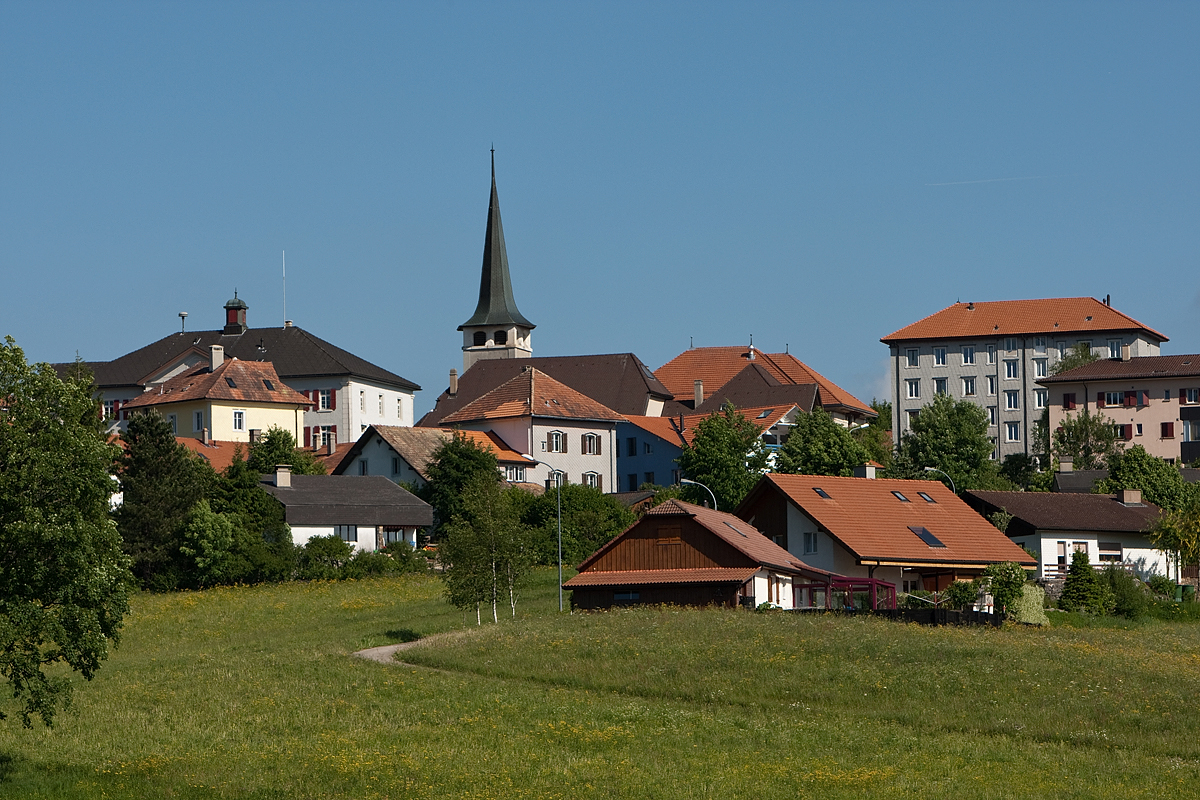

- Coat of arms
- Location of Saignelégier
- Location within Switzerland Location within Canton of Jura
- Coordinates: 47°15′N 7°00′E
- Country: Switzerland
- Canton: Jura
- District: Franches-Montagnes

Government
  - Executive: Conseil communal with 7 members
  - Mayor: Maire; Catherine Erba SPS/PSS (as of 2026)

Area
  - Total: 31.64 km^{2} (12.22 sq mi)
- Elevation: 978 m (3,209 ft)

Population (December 2020)
  - Total: 2,615
  - Density: 82.65/km^{2} (214.1/sq mi)
- Time zone: UTC+01:00 (CET)
  - Summer (DST): UTC+02:00 (CEST)
- Postal code: 2350
- SFOS number: 6757
- ISO 3166 code: CH-JU
- Surrounded by: La Chaux-des-Breuleux, Le Bémont, Les Enfers, Muriaux, Soubey, Tramelan (BE)
- Website: www.saignelegier.ch

Saignelégier (French pronunciation: [sɛɲleʒje]; Frainc-Comtou: Sainneleudgie) is a municipality in the canton of Jura in Switzerland. It is the seat of the district of Franches-Montagnes. On 1 January 2009, the formerly independent municipalities of Goumois and Les Pommerats merged into Saignelégier.

The bog and nature preserve around étang de la Gruère is located in the municipality. It is also the home of noted brewery Brasserie des Franches-Montagnes.

== History ==
Aerial view (1955)

Saignelégier is first mentioned in 1294 as Saignelegier. The municipality was formerly known by its German name Sankt Leodegar, however, that name is no longer used.

During the Middle Ages the village of Saignelégier was part of the diocese of Basel. During the 15th century, Saignelégier began to grow into an important regional town. A chapel was built and a yearly market started in 1428. Around the same time, the pastor of Montfaucon, the head of the main parish of the Franches-Montagnes region, moved to Saignelégier. In 1629 it became an independent parish.

In 1691, it became the seat of the Bishop's bailiff over the surrounding area. The bailiff's castle was built around the end of the 17th century. After the French invasion (1793–1813), Saignelégier was the capital of the canton in the Département of Mont-Terrible and then in the Département of Haut-Rhin. Following the collapse of Napoleonic France, in 1815 it became part of the Canton of Bern, where it remained until the founding of the Canton of Jura in 1978.

With the advent of the watch industry in Switzerland in the 19th century and the opening of rail lines in 1892 to La Chaux-de-Fonds and Glovelier in 1904, a number of precision manufacturing firms settled in Saignelégier. By 2005, 35% of the population worked in manufacturing while 61% were in technology and services jobs. Almost two-thirds of the workers in town commute elsewhere for work.

== Geography ==
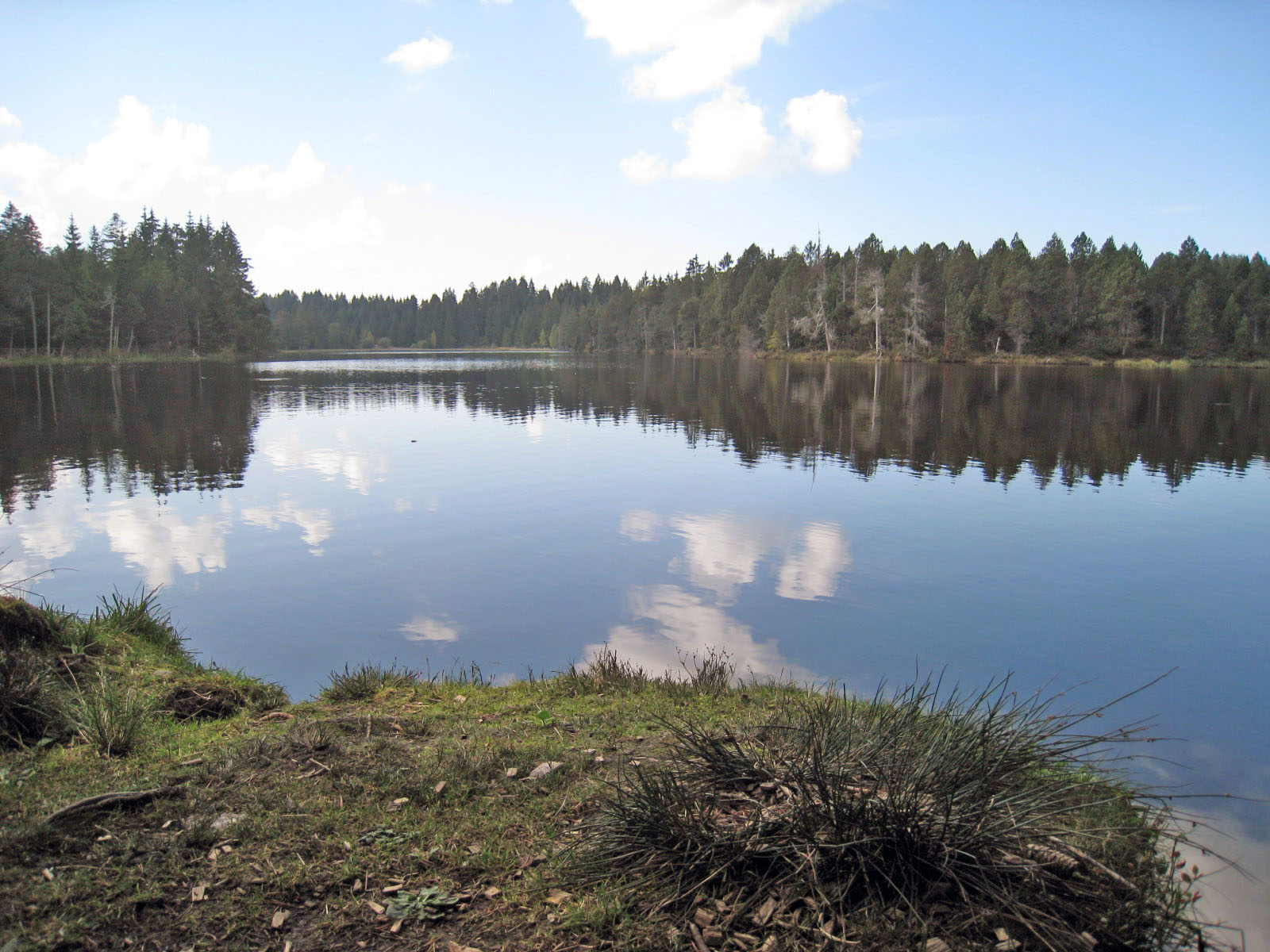
Etang de la Gruère

Saignelégier has an area of 31.67 km^{2} (12.23 sq mi). Of this area, 13.44 km^{2} (5.19 mi^{2}) or 42.5% is used for agricultural purposes, while 16.06 km^{2} (6.20 mi^{2}) or 50.8% is forested. Of the rest of the land, 1.72 km^{2} (0.66 mi^{2}) or 5.4% is settled (buildings or roads), 0.21 km^{2} (0.081 mi^{2}) or 0.7% is either rivers or lakes and 0.32 km^{2} (0.12 mi^{2}) or 1.0% is unproductive land.

Of the built up area, housing and buildings made up 2.3% and transportation infrastructure made up 2.2%. Out of the forested land, 46.7% of the total land area is heavily forested and 4.0% is covered with orchards or small clusters of trees. Of the agricultural land, 5.9% is used for growing crops and 22.3% is pastures and 14.2% is used for alpine pastures. Of the water in the municipality, 0.3% is in lakes and 0.3% is in rivers and streams.

The municipality is the capital of the Franches-Montagnes district. Since the 2009 merger, it has stretched from the banks of the Doubs river to the Etang de la Gruère. The original village lies at the intersection of the roads to Delémont, Tramelan, La Chaux-de-Fonds and France. It consists of the villages of Saignelégier, Les Pommerats and Goumois and a number of hamlets.

The municipalities of Le Bémont, Les Bois, Les Breuleux, La Chaux-des-Breuleux, Les Enfers, Les Genevez, Lajoux, Montfaucon, Muriaux, Le Noirmont, Saignelégier, Saint-Brais and Soubey are considering a merger at a date in the future into the new municipality of Franches-Montagnes.

== Coat of arms ==
The blazon of the municipal coat of arms is Or, a Roundel Argent bordered Sable, in base Coupeaux of Six Gules.

== Demographics ==
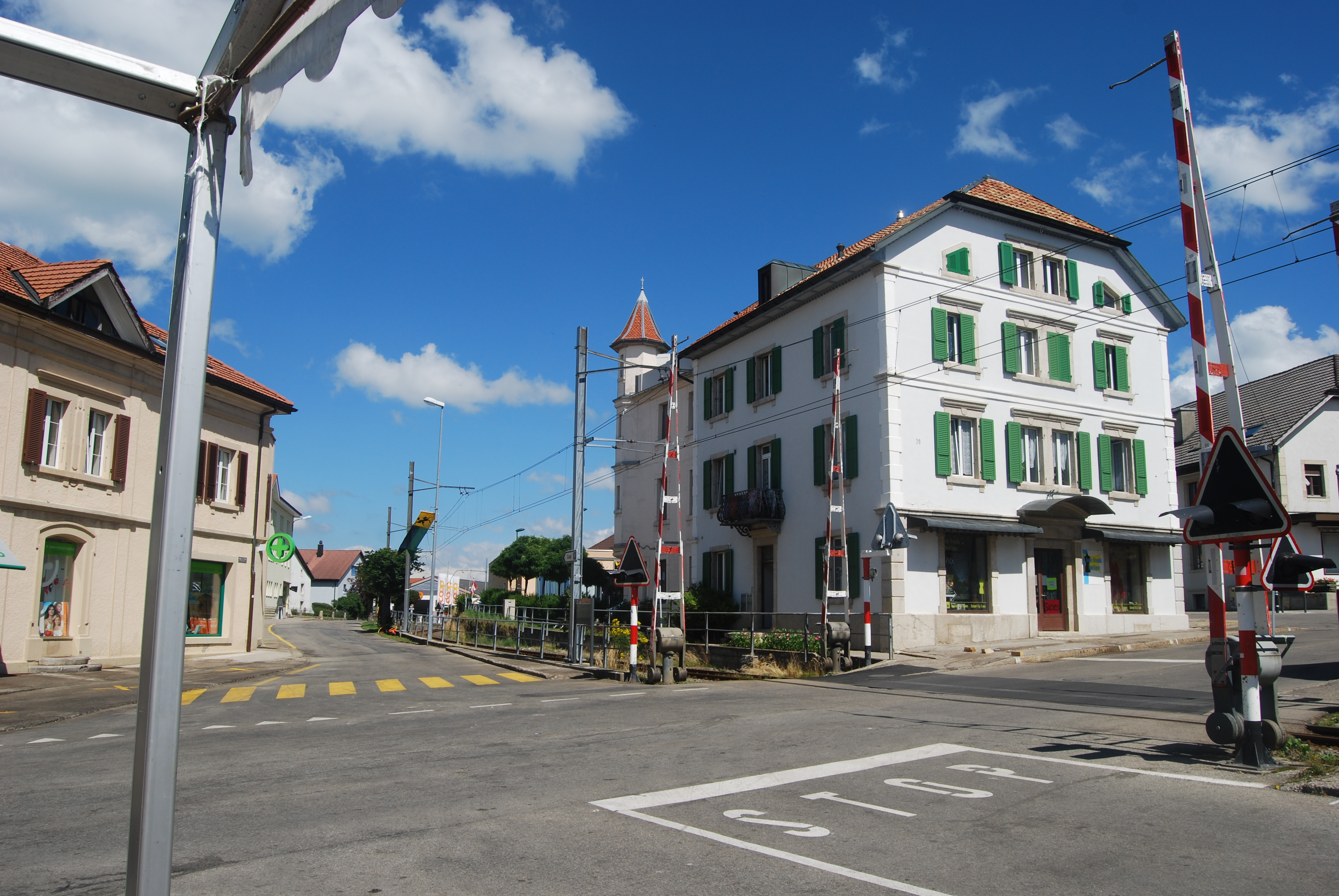
Saignelégier

Saignelégier has a population (as of December 2020) of 2,615. As of 2008, 8.5% of the population are resident foreign nationals. Over the last 10 years (2000–2010) the population has changed at a rate of 10%. Migration accounted for 10.7%, while births and deaths accounted for 0.4%.

Most of the population (as of 2000) speaks French (1,961 or 91.4%) as their first language, German is the second most common (69 or 3.2%) and Italian is the third (20 or 0.9%). There are 3 people who speak Romansh.

As of 2008, the population was 49.5% male and 50.5% female. The population was made up of 1,151 Swiss men (45.5% of the population) and 100 (4.0%) non-Swiss men. There were 1,177 Swiss women (46.6%) and 99 (3.9%) non-Swiss women. Of the population in the municipality, 721 or about 33.6% were born in Saignelégier and lived there in 2000. There were 678 or 31.6% who were born in the same canton, while 360 or 16.8% were born somewhere else in Switzerland, and 260 or 12.1% were born outside of Switzerland.

As of 2000, children and teenagers (0–19 years old) make up 27.1% of the population, while adults (20–64 years old) make up 56.5% and seniors (over 64 years old) make up 16.4%.

As of 2000, there were 943 people who were single and never married in the municipality. There were 955 married individuals, 130 widows or widowers and 117 individuals who are divorced.

As of 2000, there were 968 private households in the municipality, and an average of 2.5 persons per household. There were 269 households that consist of only one person and 67 households with five or more people. In 2000, a total of 816 apartments (89.1% of the total) were permanently occupied, while 79 apartments (8.6%) were seasonally occupied and 21 apartments (2.3%) were empty. As of 2009, the construction rate of new housing units was 3.2 new units per 1000 residents. The vacancy rate for the municipality, in 2010, was 0.85%.

The historical population is given in the following chart:

== Sights ==
The entire village of Les Pommerats and the hamlet of Les Cerlatez are designated as part of the Inventory of Swiss Heritage Sites

== Politics ==
In the 2007 federal election the most popular party was the SPS which received 36.77% of the vote. The next three most popular parties were the CVP (23.89%), the CSP (23.34%) and the SVP (9.14%). In the federal election, a total of 727 votes were cast, and the voter turnout was 46.2%.

== Economy ==
As of 2010, Saignelégier had an unemployment rate of 4.1%. As of 2008, there were 109 people employed in the primary economic sector and about 42 businesses involved in this sector. 567 people were employed in the secondary sector and there were 51 businesses in this sector. 911 people were employed in the tertiary sector, with 121 businesses in this sector. There were 1,055 residents of the municipality who were employed in some capacity, of which females made up 44.6% of the workforce.

In 2008, the total number of full-time equivalent jobs was 1,239. The number of jobs in the primary sector was 38, of which 37 were in agriculture and 1 was in forestry or lumber production. The number of jobs in the secondary sector was 509 of which 401 or (78.8%) were in manufacturing and 104 (20.4%) were in construction. The number of jobs in the tertiary sector was 692. In the tertiary sector; 152 or 22.0% were in wholesale or retail sales or the repair of motor vehicles, 44 or 6.4% were in the movement and storage of goods, 62 or 9.0% were in a hotel or restaurant, 3 or 0.4% were in the information industry, 91 or 13.2% were the insurance or financial industry, 47 or 6.8% were technical professionals or scientists, 49 or 7.1% were in education and 135 or 19.5% were in health care.

In 2000, there were 778 workers who commuted into the municipality and 401 workers who commuted away. The municipality is a net importer of workers, with about 1.9 workers entering the municipality for every one leaving. About 17.0% of the workforce coming into Saignelégier are coming from outside Switzerland. Of the working population, 5.6% used public transportation to get to work, and 55.1% used a private car.

== Transport ==
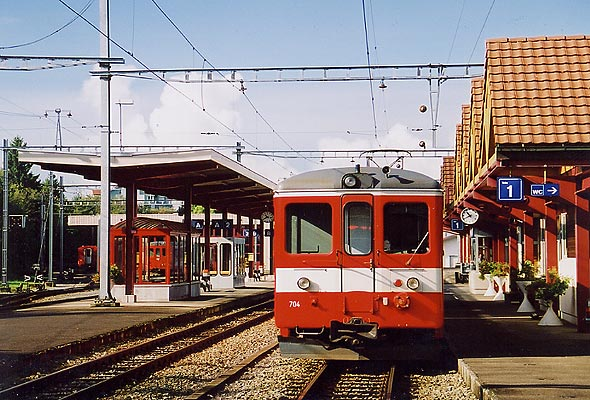
Train station

The municipality has a railway station, Saignelégier, on the La Chaux-de-Fonds–Glovelier line.

== Religion ==
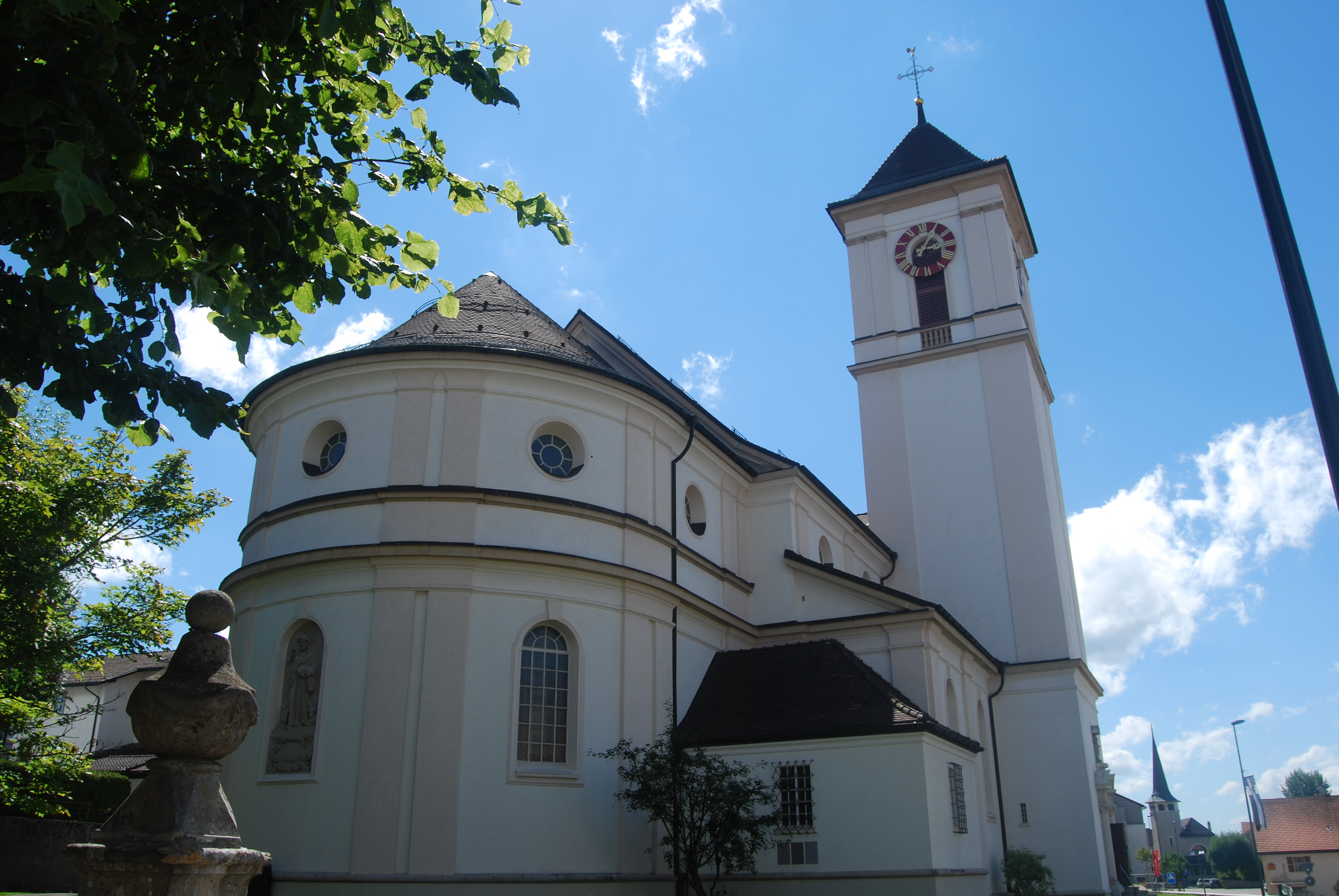
Catholic church in Saignelégier

From the 2000 census, 1,544 or 72.0% were Roman Catholic, while 237 or 11.0% belonged to the Swiss Reformed Church. Of the rest of the population, there were 17 members of an Orthodox church (or about 0.79% of the population), there was 1 individual who belongs to the Christian Catholic Church, and there were 58 individuals (or about 2.70% of the population) who belonged to another Christian church. There were 27 (or about 1.26% of the population) who were Islamic. There was 1 person who was Buddhist and 9 individuals who were Hindu. 146 (or about 6.81% of the population) belonged to no church, are agnostic or atheist, and 133 individuals (or about 6.20% of the population) did not answer the question.

== Weather ==
Saignelégier has an average of 153.6 days of rain or snow per year and on average receives 1,511 mm (59.5 in) of precipitation. The wettest month is June during which time Saignelégier receives an average of 152 mm (6.0 in) of rain or snow. During this month there is precipitation for an average of 13.7 days. The month with the most days of precipitation is May, with an average of 15.8, but with only 150 mm (5.9 in) of rain or snow. The driest month of the year is October with an average of 98 mm (3.9 in) of precipitation over 10 days.

== Education ==
In Saignelégier about 747 or (34.8%) of the population have completed non-mandatory upper secondary education, and 183 or (8.5%) have completed additional higher education (either university or a Fachhochschule). Of the 183 who completed tertiary schooling, 58.5% were Swiss men, 29.0% were Swiss women, 6.6% were non-Swiss men and 6.0% were non-Swiss women.

The Canton of Jura school system provides two-year of non-obligatory Kindergarten, followed by six years of Primary school. This is followed by three years of obligatory lower Secondary school where the students are separated according to ability and aptitude. Following the lower Secondary students may attend a three or four-year optional upper Secondary school followed by some form of Tertiary school or they may enter an apprenticeship.

During the 2009–10 school year, there were a total of 343 students attending 18 classes in Saignelégier. There were 3 kindergarten classes with a total of 56 students in the municipality. The municipality had 9 primary classes and 167 students. During the same year, there were 6 lower secondary classes with a total of 120 students.

As of 2000, there were 66 students in Saignelégier who came from another municipality, while 81 residents attended schools outside the municipality.
