= Les Breuleux-Eglise railway station =

Railway station in Les Breuleux, Switzerland

Les Breuleux-Eglise
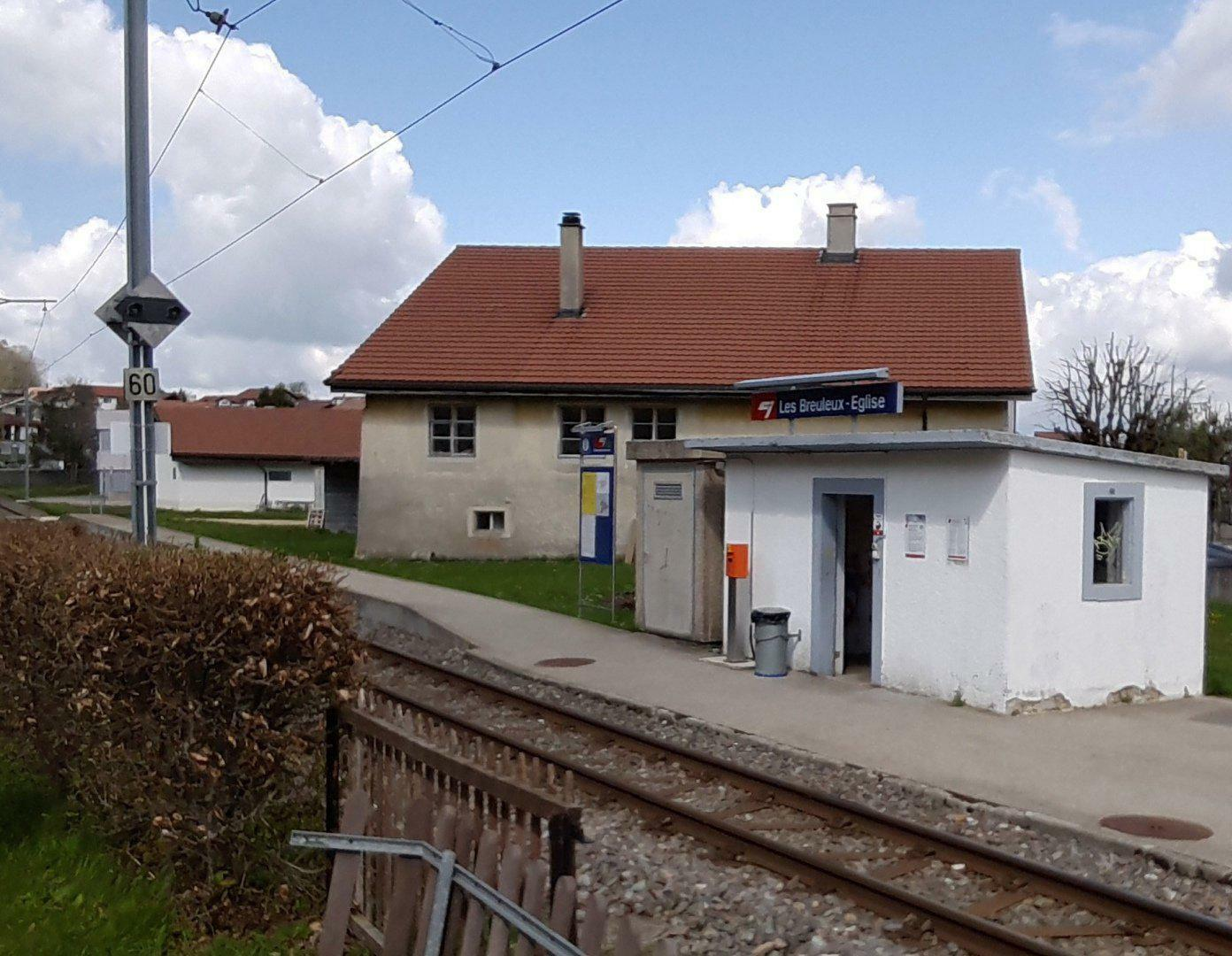
- The station in 2019

General information
- Location: Les Breuleux, Jura; Switzerland
- Coordinates: 47°12′47″N 7°00′07″E
- Elevation: 1,050 m (3,440 ft)
- Owner: Chemins de fer du Jura
- Line: Tavannes–Noirmont
- Distance: 18.6 km (11.6 mi) from Tavannes
- Platforms: 1 side platform
- Tracks: 1
- Train operators: Chemins de fer du Jura

Construction
- Accessible: No

Other information
- Station code: 8500167 (BREL)
- Fare zone: 41 (Vagabond); 42 (Onde Verte and Vagabond)

Services
Preceding station	Chemins de fer du Jura	Following station
Le Noirmont Terminus	R37	Les Breuleux towards Tavannes
Location
- Location within Switzerland Location within Canton of Jura

Les Breuleux-Eglise railway station (French: Gare des Breuleux-Eglise) is a railway station in the municipality of Les Breuleux, in the Swiss canton of Jura. It is an intermediate stop and a request stop on the 1,000 mm (3 ft 3 3/8 in) metre gauge Tavannes–Noirmont railway line of Chemins de fer du Jura. It is one of the two stations in the municipality: the other, Les Breuleux, is 0.7 kilometres (0.43 mi) further down the line.

== Services ==
As of the December 2023 timetable change, the following services stop at Les Breuleux-Eglise:

- Regio: hourly service between Le Noirmont and Tavannes. Connections are made in Le Noirmont for La Chaux-de-Fonds and Saignelégier, and in Tavannes for Sonceboz-Sombeval, Biel/Bienne and Moutier.
