= Etang de la Gruère =

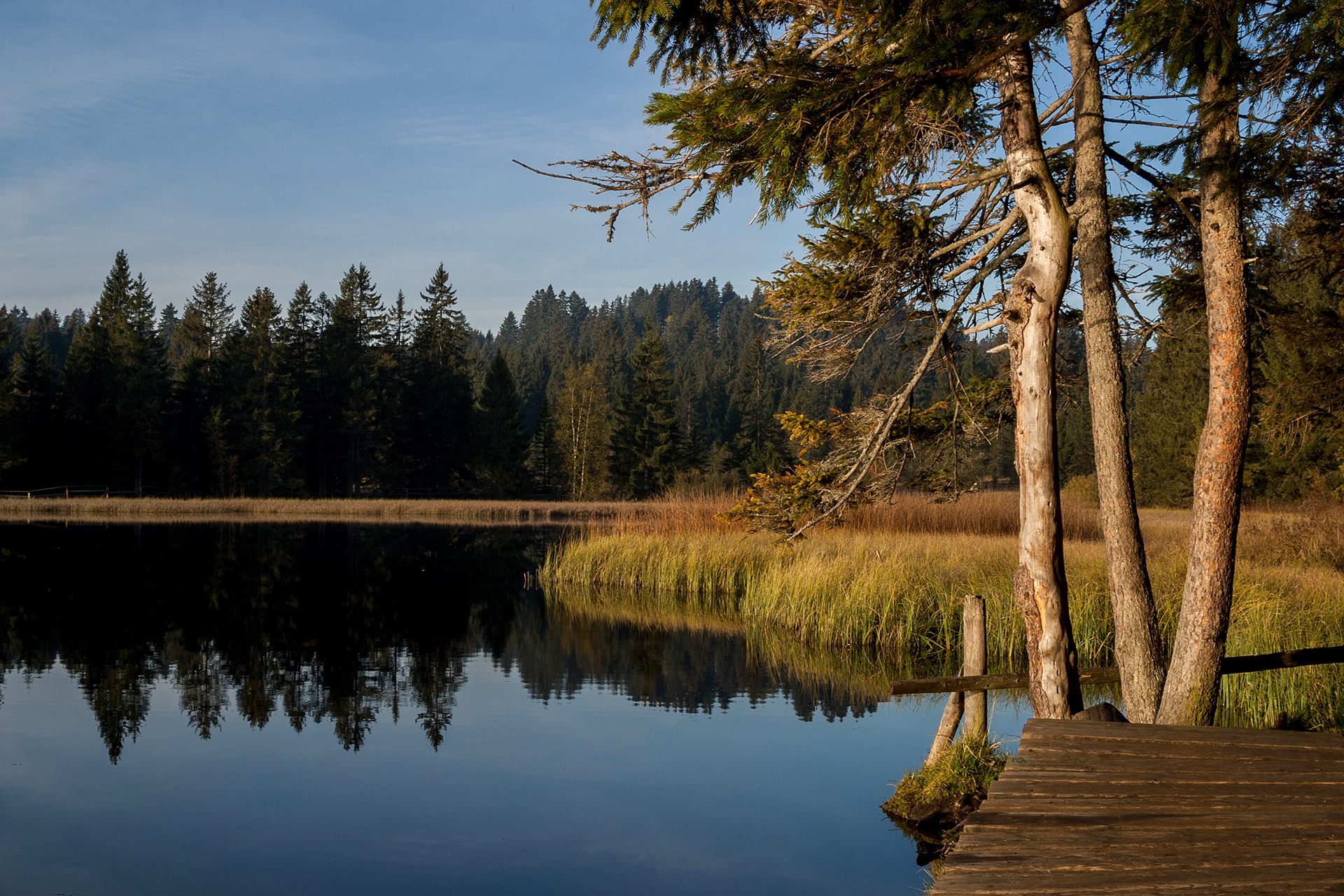

- Location within Canton of Jura Location within Canton of Bern Location within Switzerland Location within Alps
- Interactive map of Etang de la Gruère
- Location: Canton of Jura
- Coordinates: 47°14′20″N 7°2′48″E
- Type: artificial lake, bog
- Basin countries: Switzerland
- Max. length: 600 m (2,000 ft)
- Surface area: 0.08 km^{2} (0.031 sq mi)
- Max. depth: 4.5 m (15 ft)
- Surface elevation: 998 m (3,274 ft)

Etang de la Gruère is a small lake in the Jura range near Saignelégier, Canton of Jura, Switzerland. The lake and the surrounding bog is a nature preserve. The lake was formed in the 17th century, when a dam was built for a mill.

== See also ==
- List of mountain lakes of Switzerland
