= Les Breuleux =

- Municipality
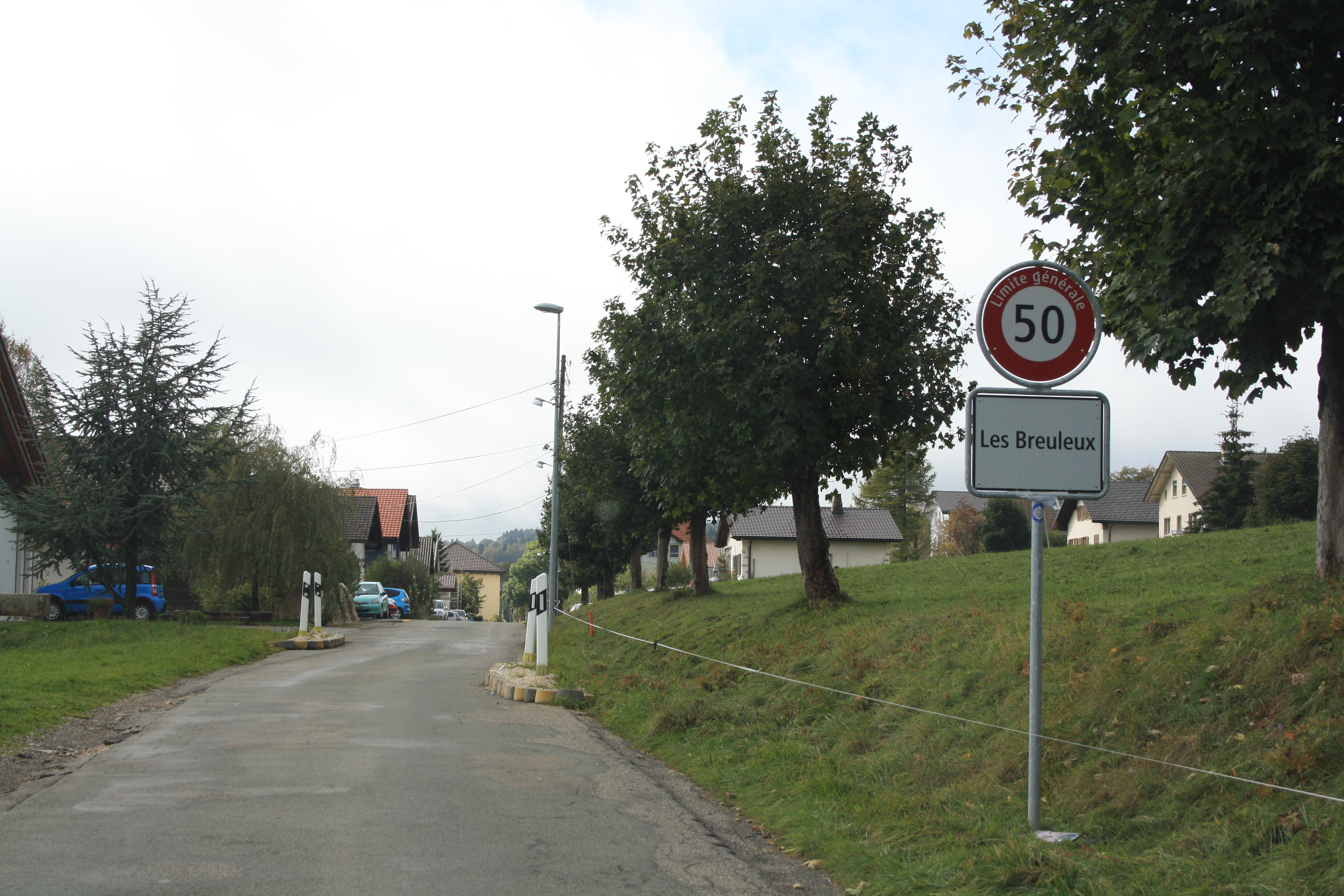
- Les Breuleux entrance

- Flag Coat of arms
- Location of Les Breuleux
- Location within Switzerland Location within Canton of Jura
- Coordinates: 47°12′N 07°00′E
- Country: Switzerland
- Canton: Jura
- District: Franches-Montagnes

Government
  - Executive: Conseil communal with 7 members
  - Mayor: Maire; Renaud Baume (as of 2026)

Area
  - Total: 10.8 km^{2} (4.2 sq mi)
- Elevation: 1,038 m (3,406 ft)

Population (2020)
  - Total: 1,528
  - Density: 141/km^{2} (366/sq mi)
- Demonym: Breulotiers (ères)
- Time zone: UTC+01:00 (CET)
  - Summer (DST): UTC+02:00 (CEST)
- Postal code: 2345
- SFOS number: 6743
- ISO 3166 code: CH-JU
- Surrounded by: Muriaux, Le Noirmont, La Chaux-des-Breuleux, Courtelary (BE), Cormoret (BE), Villeret (BE)
- Website: https://www.breuleux.ch/

Les Breuleux (French pronunciation: [le bʁœlø]) is a municipality in the district of Franches-Montagnes in the canton of Jura in Switzerland. On 1 January 2023 the former municipality of La Chaux-des-Breuleux merged to form the municipality of Les Breuleux.

== History ==
Les Breuleux is first mentioned in 1429 as Les Bruilluit.

== Geography ==
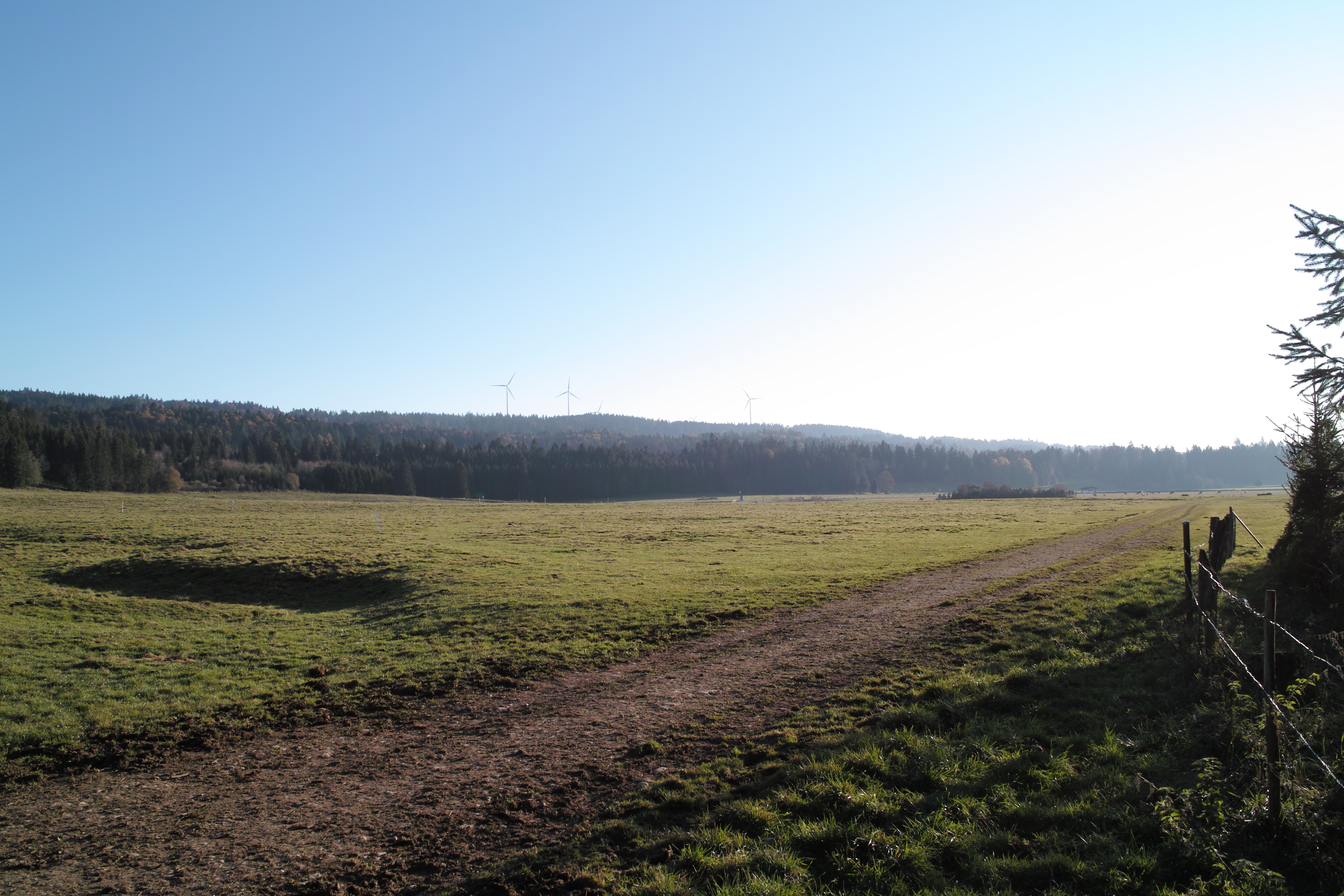
Pasture near Les Breuleux

Aerial view from 300 m by Walter Mittelholzer (1931)

Les Breuleux has an area of 10.82 km^{2} (4.18 sq mi). Of this area, 6.72 km^{2} (2.59 mi^{2}) or 62.2% is used for agricultural purposes, while 3.26 km^{2} (1.26 mi^{2}) or 30.2% is forested. Of the rest of the land, 0.83 km^{2} (0.32 mi^{2}) or 7.7% is settled (buildings or roads) and 0.01 km^{2} (2.5 acres) or 0.1% is unproductive land.

Of the built up area, industrial buildings made up 1.1% of the total area while housing and buildings made up 4.0% and transportation infrastructure made up 2.0%. Out of the forested land, 23.5% of the total land area is heavily forested and 6.7% is covered with orchards or small clusters of trees. Of the agricultural land, 3.4% is used for growing crops and 37.0% is pastures and 21.7% is used for alpine pastures.

The municipality is located in the Franches-Montagnes district. It consists of a number of hamlets including Les Vacheries.

The municipalities of Le Bémont, Les Bois, Les Breuleux, La Chaux-des-Breuleux, Les Enfers, Les Genevez, Lajoux, Montfaucon, Muriaux, Le Noirmont, Saignelégier, Saint-Brais and Soubey are considering a merger on at a date in the future into the new municipality of Franches-Montagnes.

== Coat of arms ==
The blazon of the municipal coat of arms is Or, a Pine Tree Vert trunked Sable issuant from Coupeaux of the last enflamed Gules. The flames on the coat of arms are an example of canting.

== Demographics ==
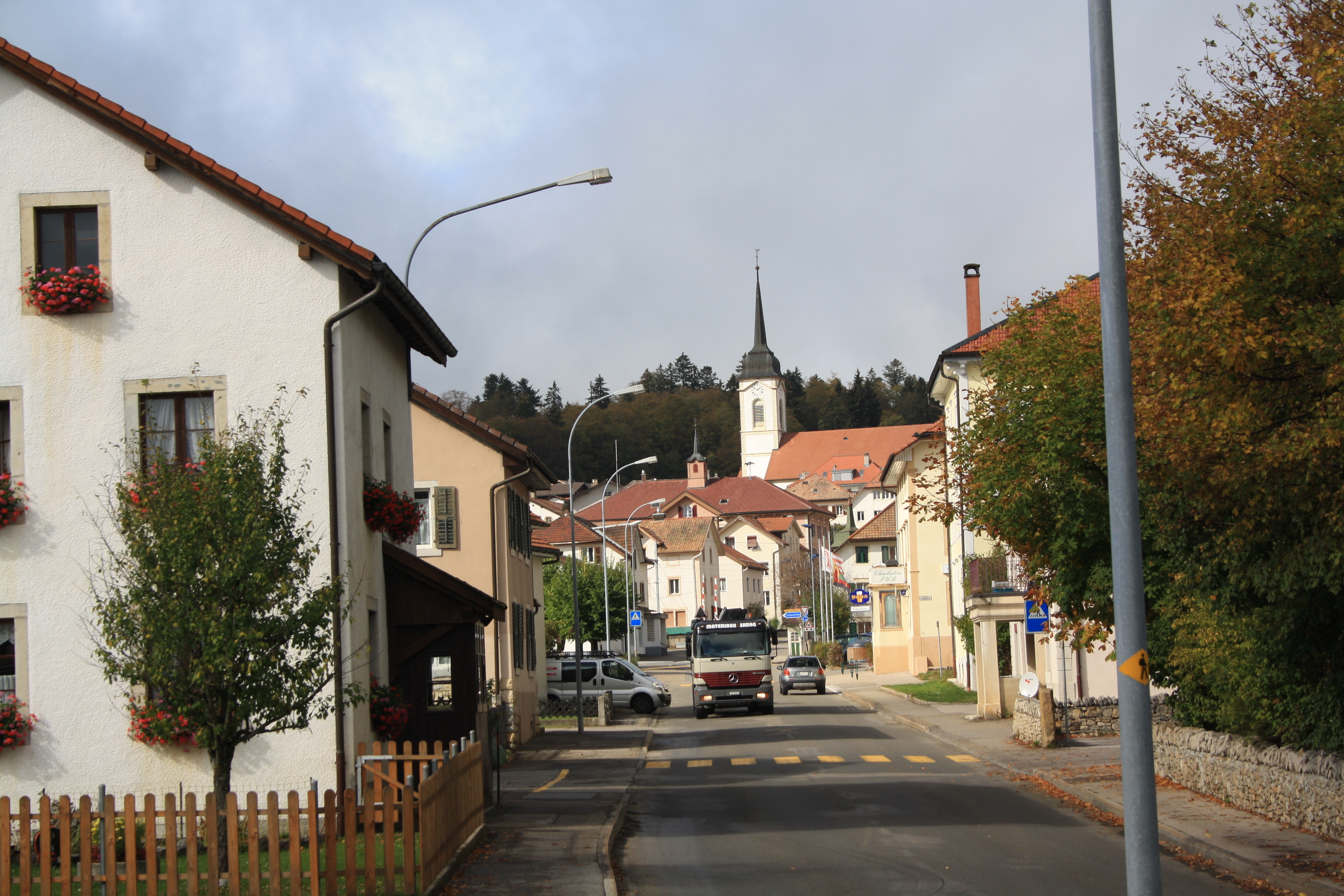
Les Breuleux village

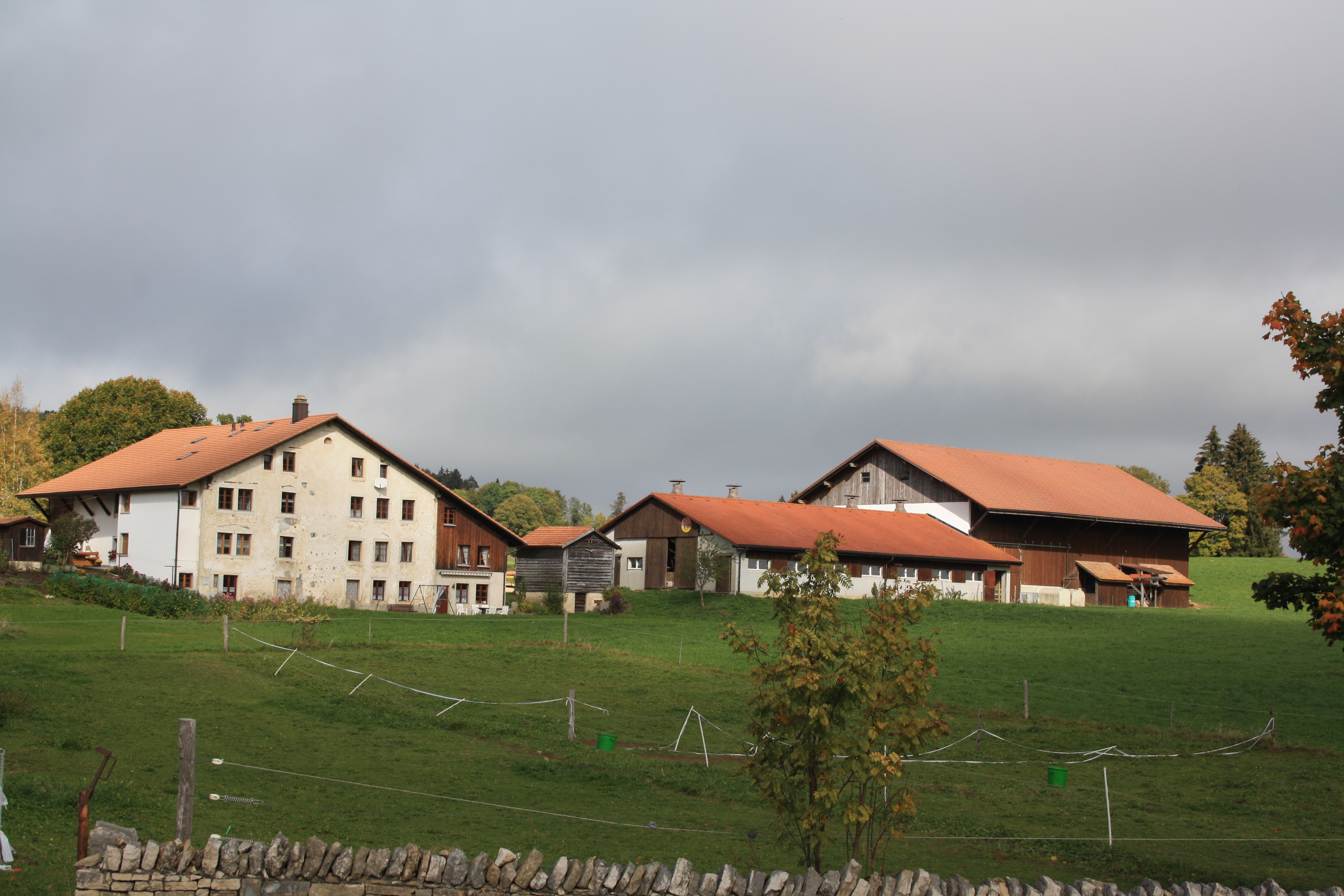
Farm houses outside Les Breuleux village

Les Breuleux has a population (as of December 2020) of 1,528. As of 2008, 14.2% of the population are resident foreign nationals. Over the last 10 years (2000–2010) the population has changed at a rate of 1.9%. Migration accounted for 4.6%, while births and deaths accounted for −1.6%.

Most of the population (as of 2000) speaks French (1,247 or 92.6%) as their first language, Portuguese is the second most common (42 or 3.1%) and German is the third (29 or 2.2%). There are 11 people who speak Italian.

As of 2008, the population was 49.4% male and 50.6% female. The population was made up of 578 Swiss men (42.1% of the population) and 100 (7.3%) non-Swiss men. There were 599 Swiss women (43.6%) and 96 (7.0%) non-Swiss women. Of the population in the municipality, 658 or about 48.8% were born in Les Breuleux and lived there in 2000. There were 242 or 18.0% who were born in the same canton, while 232 or 17.2% were born somewhere else in Switzerland, and 166 or 12.3% were born outside of Switzerland.

As of 2000, children and teenagers (0–19 years old) make up 24.8% of the population, while adults (20–64 years old) make up 56.6% and seniors (over 64 years old) make up 18.6%.

As of 2000, there were 563 people who were single and never married in the municipality. There were 646 married individuals, 85 widows or widowers and 53 individuals who are divorced.

As of 2000, there were 548 private households in the municipality, and an average of 2.4 persons per household. There were 172 households that consist of only one person and 52 households with five or more people. In 2000, a total of 535 apartments (87.6% of the total) were permanently occupied, while 54 apartments (8.8%) were seasonally occupied and 22 apartments (3.6%) were empty. As of 2009, the construction rate of new housing units was 9.5 new units per 1000 residents. The vacancy rate for the municipality, in 2010, was 2.8%.

The historical population is given in the following chart:

== Heritage sites of national significance ==
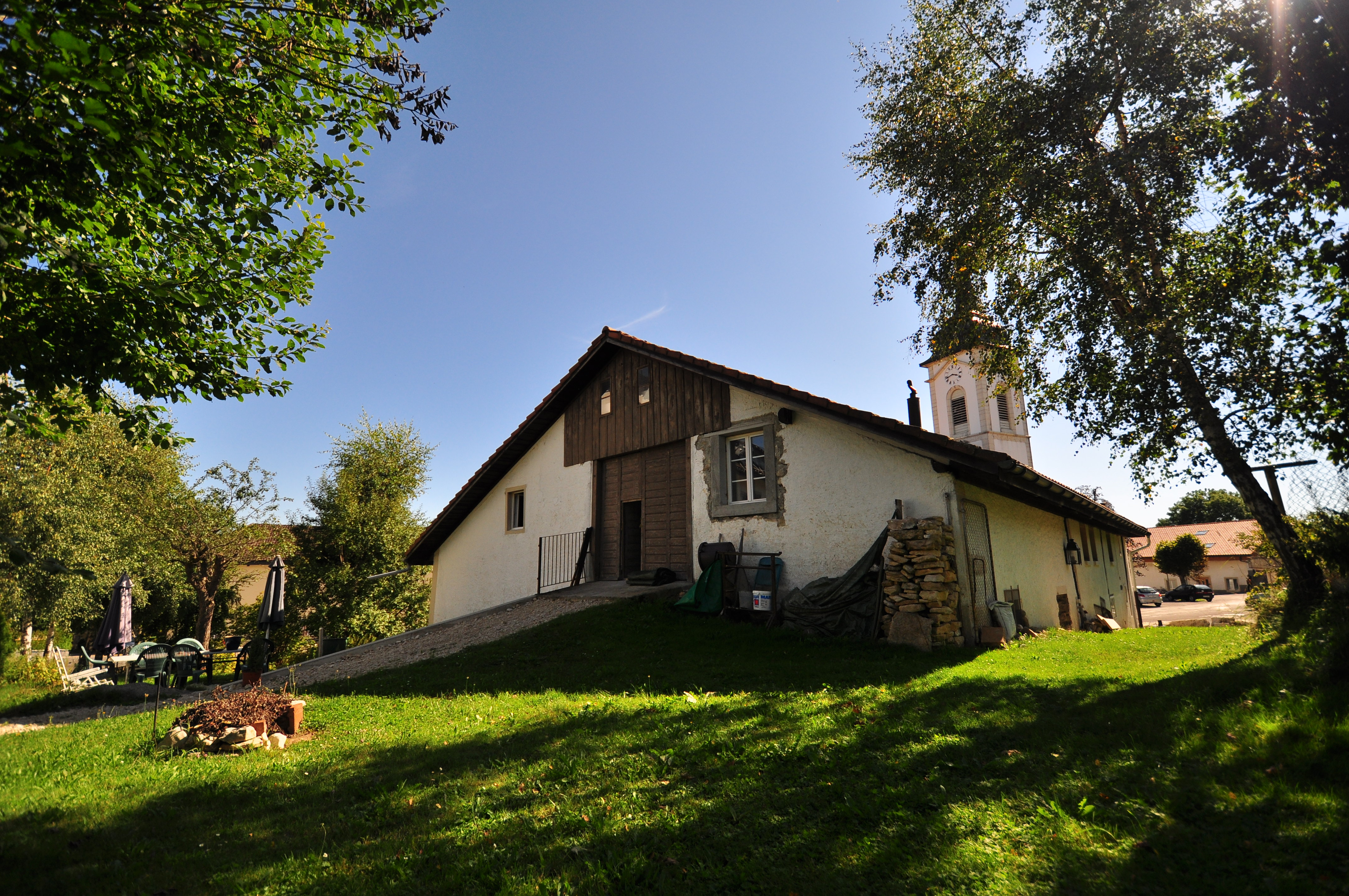
Farm House at Du Peu-Girard 46 A

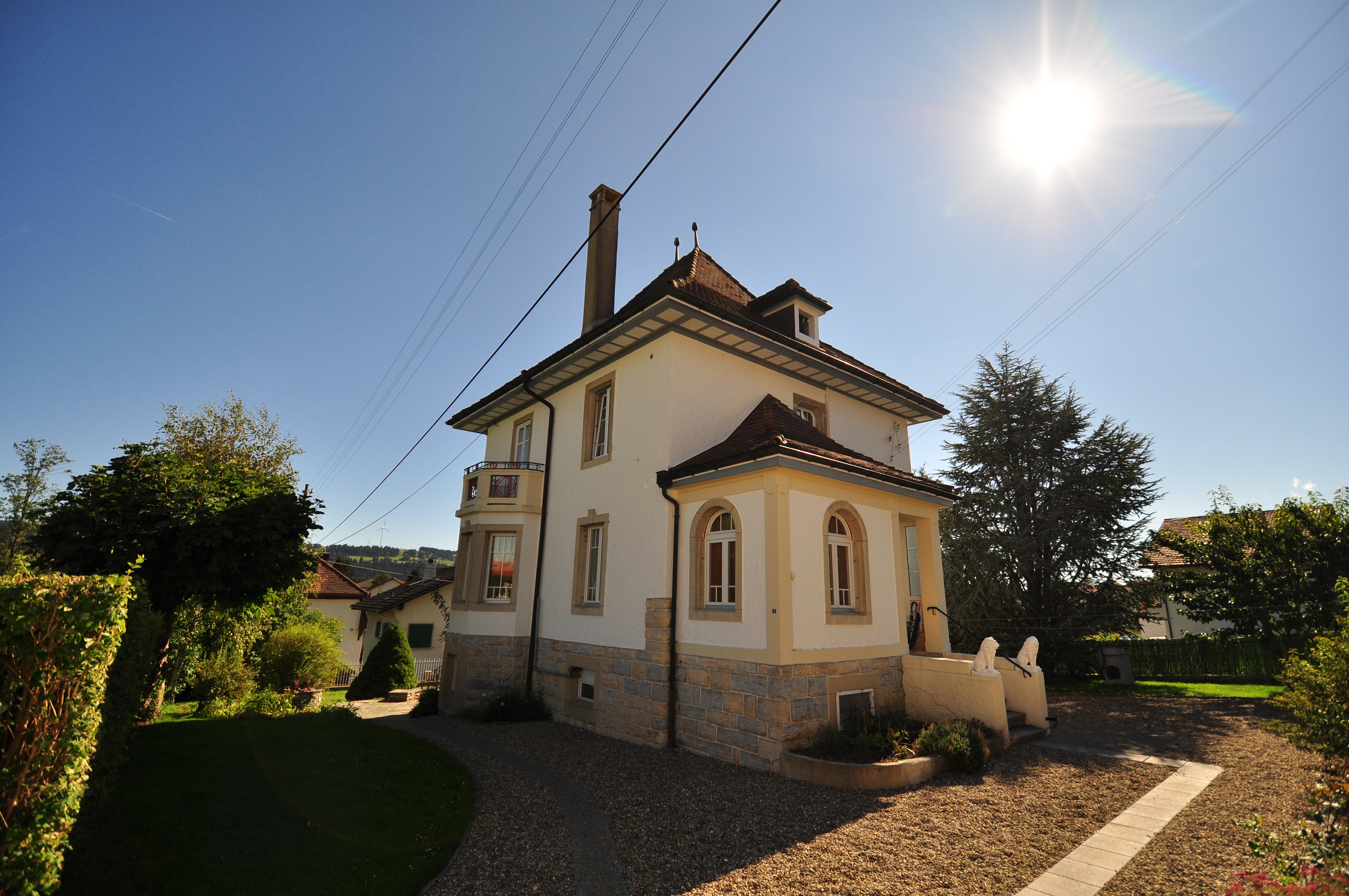
Farm House at Sur le Cratan 13

The farm house at Du Peu-Girard 46 A and the farm house at Sur le Cratan 13 are listed as Swiss heritage site of national significance.

== Politics ==
In the 2007 federal election the most popular party was the SPS which received 34.65% of the vote. The next three most popular parties were the FDP (22.73%), the CSP (18.08%) and the CVP (14.85%). In the federal election, a total of 500 votes were cast, and the voter turnout was 53.0%.

== Economy ==
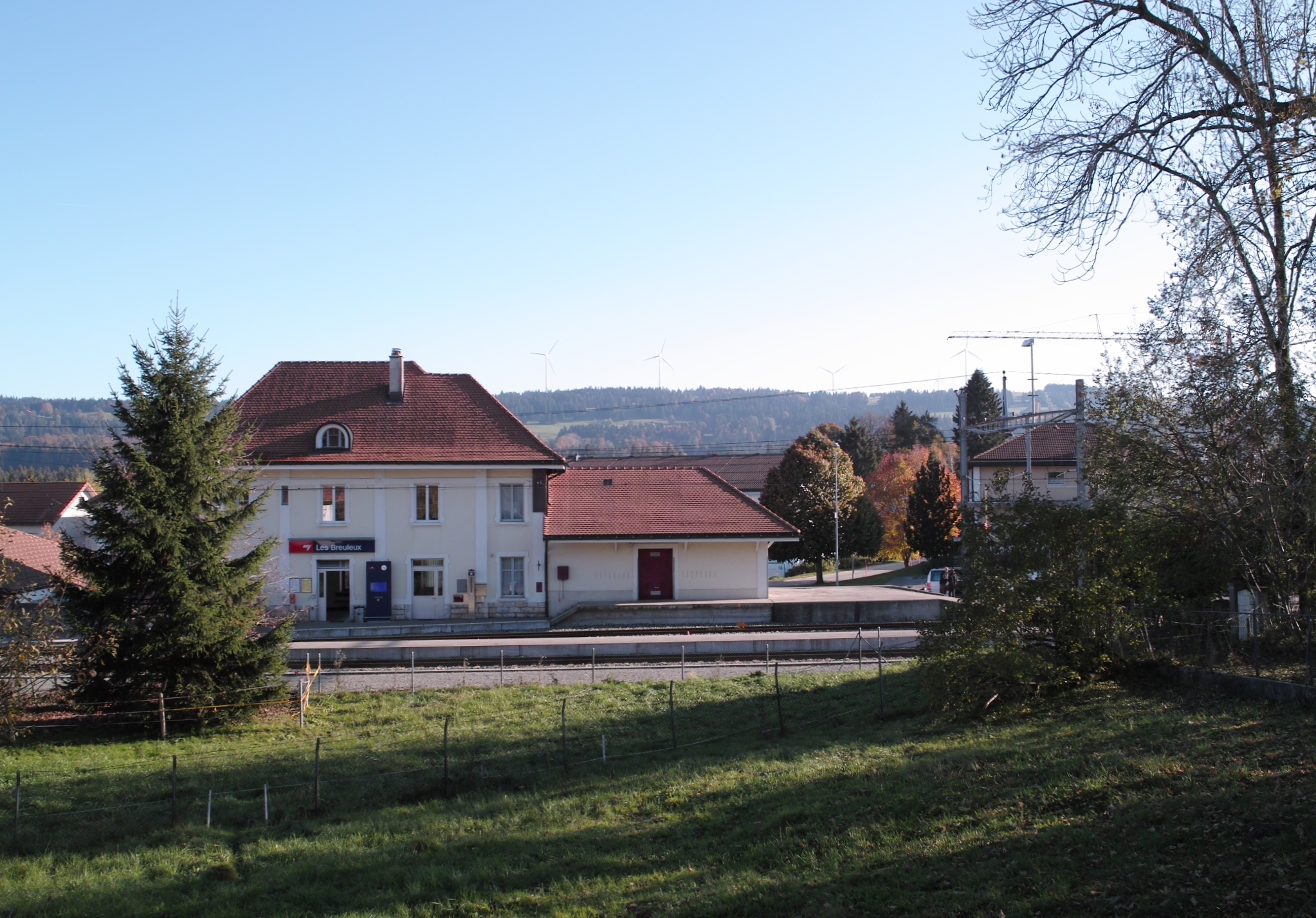
Les Breuleux railway station

As of 2010, Les Breuleux had an unemployment rate of 5.7%. As of 2008, there were 65 people employed in the primary economic sector and about 24 businesses involved in this sector. 657 people were employed in the secondary sector and there were 25 businesses in this sector. 154 people were employed in the tertiary sector, with 36 businesses in this sector. There were 672 residents of the municipality who were employed in some capacity, of which females made up 44.2% of the workforce.

In 2008 the total number of full-time equivalent jobs was 797. The number of jobs in the primary sector was 47, of which 42 were in agriculture and 5 were in forestry or lumber production. The number of jobs in the secondary sector was 622 of which 552 or (88.7%) were in manufacturing and 70 (11.3%) were in construction. The number of jobs in the tertiary sector was 128. In the tertiary sector; 28 or 21.9% were in wholesale or retail sales or the repair of motor vehicles, 11 or 8.6% were in the movement and storage of goods, 13 or 10.2% were in a hotel or restaurant, 2 or 1.6% were in the information industry, 1 was the insurance or financial industry, 6 or 4.7% were technical professionals or scientists, 25 or 19.5% were in education and 3 or 2.3% were in health care.

In 2000, there were 550 workers who commuted into the municipality and 314 workers who commuted away. The municipality is a net importer of workers, with about 1.8 workers entering the municipality for every one leaving. About 26.9% of the workforce coming into Les Breuleux are coming from outside Switzerland. Of the working population, 7.1% used public transportation to get to work, and 58.3% used a private car.

== Religion ==
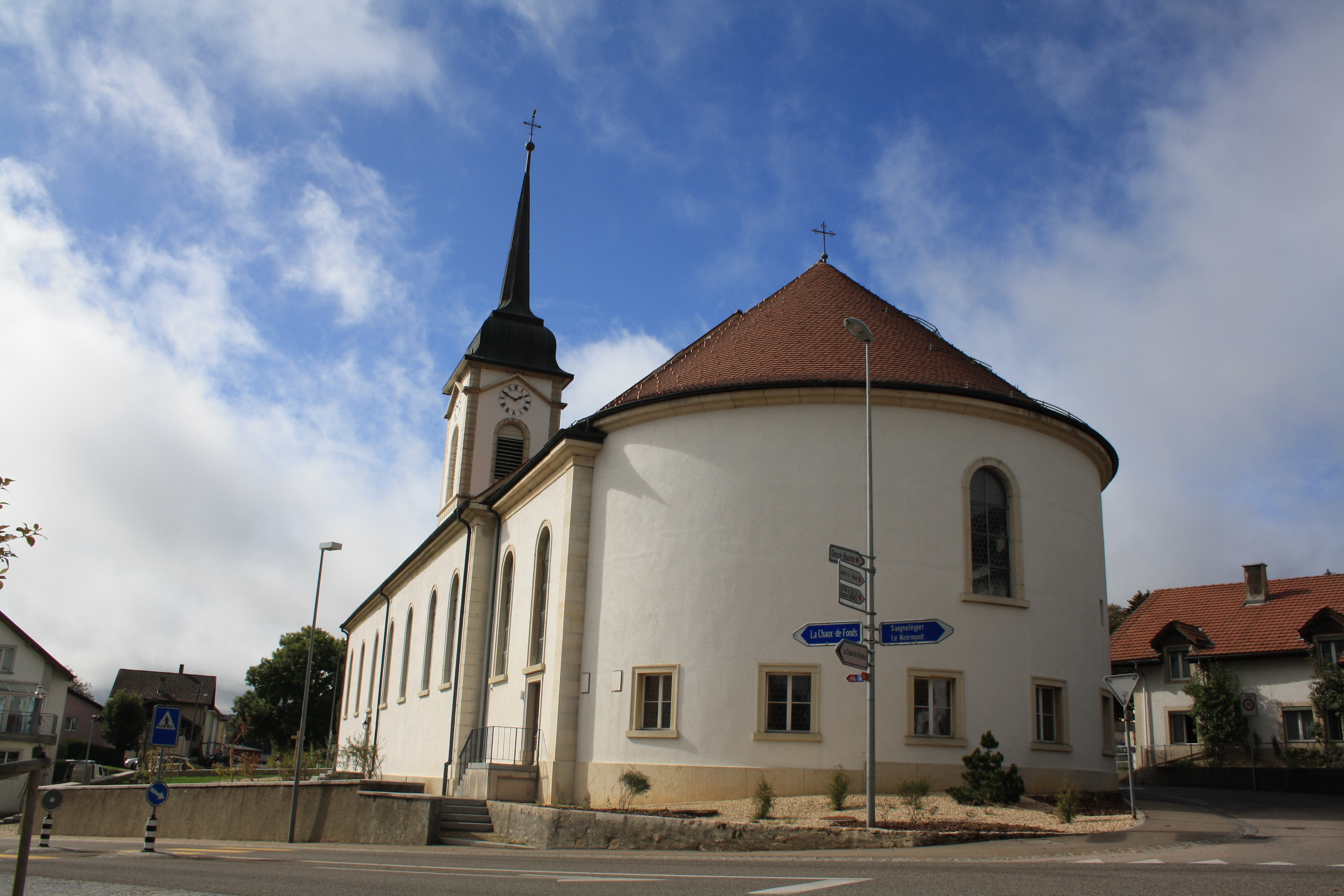
Les Breuleux church

From the 2000 census, 1,031 or 76.5% were Roman Catholic, while 122 or 9.1% belonged to the Swiss Reformed Church. Of the rest of the population, there were 46 individuals (or about 3.41% of the population) who belonged to another Christian church. There were 6 (or about 0.45% of the population) who were Islamic. There were 1 individual who belonged to another church. 103 (or about 7.65% of the population) belonged to no church, are agnostic or atheist, and 60 individuals (or about 4.45% of the population) did not answer the question.

== Education ==
In Les Breuleux about 463 or (34.4%) of the population have completed non-mandatory upper secondary education, and 115 or (8.5%) have completed additional higher education (either university or a Fachhochschule). Of the 115 who completed tertiary schooling, 66.1% were Swiss men, 22.6% were Swiss women, 4.3% were non-Swiss men and 7.0% were non-Swiss women.

The Canton of Jura school system provides two year of non-obligatory Kindergarten, followed by six years of Primary school. This is followed by three years of obligatory lower Secondary school where the students are separated according to ability and aptitude. Following the lower Secondary students may attend a three or four year optional upper Secondary school followed by some form of Tertiary school or they may enter an apprenticeship.

During the 2009–10 school year, there were a total of 285 students attending 15 classes in Les Breuleux. There were 2 kindergarten classes with a total of 33 students in the municipality. The municipality had 7 primary classes and 123 students. During the same year, there were 6 lower secondary classes with a total of 129 students.

As of 2000, there were 135 students in Les Breuleux who came from another municipality, while 61 residents attended schools outside the municipality.

== Transportation ==
The municipality has two railway stations, Les Breuleux and Les Breuleux-Eglise. Both are located on the Tavannes–Noirmont railway line.
