= History of the Canton of Jura =

History of Swiss canton

The history of the Canton of Jura spans from prehistoric times through the formation of the Prince-Bishopric of Basel, its incorporation into the Canton of Bern in 1815, and ultimately the creation of the Canton of Jura as Switzerland's newest canton in 1979.

== Prehistory and antiquity ==
=== Paleolithic and Mesolithic periods ===
Rich flint-working workshops have been attested from the Riss-Würm interglacial (Eemian) at Alle, at the site called Noir Bois, dating to approximately 120,000 years ago. The Mousterian culture, associated with Neanderthal populations, continued there periodically until around 35,000 BC. The flint deposits of Alle (Noir Bois and Pré Monsieur) and Löwenbourg provided raw materials exploited on site, mainly during warming periods that punctuated the last ice age (Würm, 35,000 to 8000 BC). The tens of thousands of flakes collected show an industry characterized by Levallois-type production. The main objects are scrapers, notches, and denticulates. These sites have also yielded tools carved from flints and quartzites from the northern foot of the Jura chain, the southern or eastern flanks of the Vosges and the Black Forest. Some pieces originate from the Swiss Plateau, from the regions of Olten and Orvin. Animal bones (mammoths, woolly rhinoceroses, hyenas, horses, reindeer) have been found on the Bure plateau as well as at Alle, Boncourt, Bure, Courtedoux, Courtemaîche, and Porrentruy. Most of the Jurassian caves sheltered cave bears. In the caves of Saint-Brais, Frédéric-Edouard Koby discovered a Neanderthal human incisor and some carved flints.

Around 13,000 BC, as the climate warmed, some Magdalenian individuals stopped at Alle - Noir Bois where they carved flint bladelets to repair their spears, using local siliceous material or working Bendorf flint (Haut-Rhin) they had brought with them. The transition to the Mesolithic, called Azilian, was uncovered at Löwenbourg. A laminar industry using local flint, dated from 12,000 to 10,000 BC, includes backed points and blades, truncated blades, burins, scrapers, and borers.

With climate warming, the return of forests, and the appearance of new characteristic fauna (deer, roe deer, wild boar, aurochs, beaver, wolf), human groups adapted to a different environment. According to discoveries, they remained confined to Ajoie and the Laufental, downstream of Liesberg. The valleys of Delémont and the Bernese Jura have yielded nothing from this period. Located in a lateral valley of the Doubs valley on the territory of the former commune of Saint-Ursanne, the small rock shelter of Les Gripons revealed a microlithic industry rich in triangular armatures, dated around 8000-7000 BC. The flint worked on site is essentially of local origin, showing these populations' adaptation to a limited region. Leather working is also attested at the same site, which was occupied temporarily. Two millennia later, another human group from the recent Mesolithic, carrying a microlithic industry (trapezoids and blades with notches and irregular retouches, Montbani type), frequented this shelter, probably to make bows. Other Mesolithic traces have been uncovered at Porrentruy and around Bure.

=== Neolithic period ===
The beginnings of sedentarization and neolithization (livestock farming and agriculture) remain very discreet in Ajoie. The region nevertheless lies at the confines of the two major currents specific to Western Europe: the Danubian, occupying the plains of Central Europe, and the Mediterranean, ascending the Rhône and Saône valleys. Some Franco-Comtois caves close to the Jura yielded ceramics characteristic of the second half of the 5th millennium. At the same period, long-distance exchanges developed. Polished stone axes of Vosges origin passed through the Jura toward the lakes of the Swiss Plateau (Zurich, Bienne, Neuchâtel). Two examples were discovered at Alle, whose flint, like that of Löwenbourg, is found in lakeside sites dating from 4000 to 2000 BC.

The Jura chain was therefore regularly crossed. However, pollen and sediment analyses seem to indicate that no site in the Delémont valley was yet inhabited. In Ajoie, a habitat is attested at Alle - Sur Noir Bois, probably from the end of the Middle Neolithic, around 3500 BC. Moreover, the Pierre Percée of Courgenay, the frontal slab of a dolmen, is the last vestige of a collective burial monument erected around 3000 BC according to customs specific to the northern flank of the Jura chain. It proves the presence of one or more villages nearby. The only one found to date (Alle - Noir Bois) dates from 2300 BC, from the end of the Neolithic, that is, the Bell Beaker period. Poorly preserved, nothing is known of its extent or architecture. Livestock farming (cattle, pigs, goats, sheep) and agriculture were practiced there. Exchanges with populations from Alsace and southern Germany are evident. More eastern influences, as well as with the Rhône valley, are perceptible. The priority exploitation of local resources (flint, clays) proves thorough knowledge of the region and long-standing settlement. Other contemporary sites are recognized in several places in Ajoie.

=== Bronze and Iron Ages ===
The beginning of the Bronze Age seems to coincide with demographic evolution. An increase in signs of human presence is observed throughout the 2nd millennium. The Ajoie plain and the Delémont valley were progressively colonized. Numerous small habitats and isolated farms dotted the foot and flanks of hillsides at the end of the Middle Bronze Age and the beginning of the Late Bronze Age. At the threshold of the Franches-Montagnes plateau, the caves of Saint-Brais yielded fairly significant ceramic material from the end of the Middle Bronze Age. Opposite, near Lajoux, pollen analyses showed that clearings took place from this period, suggesting cattle summering. A contemporary site is reported at the summit of Mont-Terri in Ajoie. That of Le Roc, in the commune of Courroux, is an important Late Bronze Age deposit. Perched in the rocks overlooking the passage of the Vorbourg gorge, it dominates the eastern access passage to the Delémont valley.

Social life developed and became hierarchical. The two necropolises of Alle - Les Aiges and Delémont - En La Pran testify to the cremation rite. The oldest burials (Les Aiges) date back to the beginning of the Late Bronze Age. The Delémont necropolis suggests a separation of the burial area. It yielded glass paste beads, proof of relations with Mediterranean milieus. The gold threads found at Alle testify to connections with the Meuse and Marne regions.

The few objects or sites from the early Iron Age (800-480 BC) can also be related to funerary rites, but, as on the Swiss Plateau, this period corresponds to a rarefaction of archaeological data. No habitat is currently known with certainty. The second Iron Age (480-15 BC) is better known, thanks to farms with granaries dated to the early La Tène culture (Alle - Noir Bois), a midden (Courtételle - Tivila), a habitat (Courrendlin - En Solé), and five sites from the late La Tène at Alle (Pré au Prince and Pré Monsieur), Chevenez (Combe Varu and forge of la Combe en Vaillard), and Mont-Terri (oppidum).

=== Roman period ===
According to writings by Roman authors, particularly Julius Caesar in his De Bello Gallico, the Gallic tribe of the Sequani then occupied the Jura region. At war against the Aedui, they called on Germanic reinforcements from Ariovistus, who were defeated by Caesar at the battle of Ochsenfeld in Alsace (58 BC). The summit of Mont-Terri may have been fortified with a murus Gallicus in these circumstances, related both to the exodus of the Rauraci and Helvetii and to the invasion of Germanic peoples.

The construction of villae and roads at the beginning of the 1st century AD marks the passage of the Jura mountains into Rome's orbit, with most establishments built on Gallic sites. Following the layout of Celtic beaten-earth paths, the Romans consolidated them with stones and gravel in the 30s AD. The current cantonal territory is located at an intersection of the Roman road that then crossed the Jura. From the Swiss Plateau, the road passed through the Pierre-Pertuis pass and Bellelay. At the western end of the Delémont valley, a branch departed toward Augusta Raurica (Augst) following the Birs. Continuing through the La Caquerelle-Les Rangiers pass, the main road crossed Ajoie toward Epomanduodurum (Mandeure), where it met the great artery along the northern flank of the Jura chain, linking Augusta Raurica to Vesuntio (Besançon). The strategic importance of this route disappeared once the Empire's border on the Rhine was pushed further east, after Vespasian's conquest of the Agri Decumates in 73-74 AD.

The vestiges of Gallo-Roman villae scattered throughout Ajoie and the Delémont valley are distributed across the entire territory, except the Bure plateau where water is lacking. The only sign of a presence in the Franches-Montagnes corresponds to the probable relay at Lajoux, on the Pierre-Pertuis road. Some sites preserve signs of certain wealth (Buix, Develier, Vicques) with decorated floors, painted walls, and imported tableware. Others appear more modest (Boécourt, Damvant). A mausoleum was erected in the Delémont plain, attached like the entire valley to Germania Superior, then probably included in the civitas Rauracorum with Upper Alsace following Domitian's territorial reorganization (86 AD). Ajoie, where a Gallo-Roman sanctuary (fanum) was built north of Porrentruy, remained Sequanian, with Mandeure and the Doubs. Both joined the Provincia Maxima Sequanorum created by Diocletian (284–305) by uniting Helvetii, Rauraci, and Sequani.

In 260–261, Alemanni raiding expeditions caused significant destruction. Some villae were abandoned, others partially repaired for a few decades. Mont-Terri was again fortified and probably occupied for some time at the beginning of the 4th century by Roman armies. In the middle of the same century, the Alemanni took advantage of struggles between the official emperor Constans and the usurper Magnentius to definitively erase the Roman presence in the Jurassian countryside, in 353-354 and then in 378. Monetary deposits found in the region highlight these two major destructive waves. Some Roman coins from the end of the 4th century suggest the maintenance of certain activity, but neither archaeology nor history reveals the slightest sign of life in the territory of Canton Jura in the 5th century. Only a few villages preserve a toponym of Latin origin. Like Chevenez, Montignez, or Vicques, they testify to continuity of habitation.

=== Early Middle Ages ===
In contrast, from the 6th century onward, fairly dense soil occupation is observed, both in Ajoie and in the Delémont valley, where the rural habitat of Develier - Courtételle proves that iron ore reduction was in full swing. This activity encouraged smelters to settle further south, notably around Corcelles and Court, as indicated by the low furnaces and heaps of slag found there. From the second half of the 6th century and especially in the 7th century, numerous necropolises confirm this marked human presence. The importance and wealth of the Merovingian cemetery of Bassecourt, discovered and excavated in the mid-1870s, suggest the existence of a Frankish aristocracy in this main town of the Sornegau, a province extending to the sources of the Birs, probably under the domination of the dukes of Alsace within Austrasia. The Alsegau, a vast territory that encompassed present-day Ajoie, remained attached to the diocese of Besançon and the kingdom of Burgundy. The 7th century demographic development, the wealth of iron ore, and the connecting route to the Swiss Plateau attracted evangelizing monks, notably the future saints Ursanne (who settled in the Clos du Doubs) and Germain (first abbot of Moutier-Grandval).

The Carolingian period left few traces in the Jurassian region, included after the Treaty of Verdun (843) in Lotharingia. It is nevertheless probably at this time that fortified towers such as those of Chetelay at Courfaivre, Béridier (Vorbourg) at Delémont, or Mont-Terri in Ajoie were erected, precursors of feudalism. In the 8th and 9th centuries, the abbey of Moutier-Grandval developed and expanded its territories in the Delémont valley at the expense of small local lords.

== Prince-Bishopric of Basel (999-1792) ==
=== Formation and territorial expansion ===
In 999, Rudolf III of Burgundy, last king of Burgundy, gave part of his territory, namely Moutier-Grandval and all its possessions, to the cathedral Church of Our Lady of Basel. This donation, which extended the temporal power of the bishop, is at the origin of the future Prince-Bishopric of Basel. The territory of Canton Jura encompassed the part of the former Prince-Bishopric of Basel formed by the seigneuries of Ajoie, Delémont, and the Franche Montagne des Bois, as well as the prévôté of Saint-Ursanne, two villages of the curtain of Bellelay, and the Sous-les-Roches parishes of the prévôté of Moutier-Grandval.

The prévôté of Saint-Ursanne, which belonged to the Diocese of Besançon, fell under the temporal and spiritual power of the bishops of Basel at the beginning of the 12th century. They also received the possessions of the lord of Asuel in 1241 and purchased those of the County of Ferrette in 1271. Defeated in 1283, the Count of Montbéliard also had to leave to the prince-bishop, supported by Rudolf I of Habsburg, sovereignty over Porrentruy and Ajoie. To consolidate their authority against the nobility, the emperor and the bishop promoted the emergence of towns. Porrentruy (1283), Delémont (1289), La Neuveville (1318), and Saint-Ursanne (1338) obtained charters of franchises. In 1384, Imier de Ramstein also granted liberties to the inhabitants of Mons Falconis or the seigneury of Muriaux (Spiegelberg) acquired around 1360, attached to the castellany of Saint-Ursanne and henceforth called the "Franche Montagne" ("Franche Montagne des Bois" in 1595), then with the clearing of lands and the multiplication of parishes, the Franches-Montagnes.

In the 14th century, the bishops of Basel, weakened and impoverished, mortgaged their Jurassian possessions. Those of the 15th century partially succeeded in restoring their authority. However, at the beginning of the 16th century, the prince's sovereignty was fully exercised only over the northern part of the bishopric (castellanies of Ajoie, Delémont, Saint-Ursanne with the Franche Montagne, as well as the Laufental). As for the southern part (prévôté of Moutier-Grandval, Erguël, La Neuveville, Tessenberg, and Bienne), it benefited from treaties of combourgeoisie signed with Bern, Fribourg, or Solothurn.

=== Reformation and confessional tensions ===
In the 16th century, the Reformation took hold in Basel (1529), then in the southern part of the bishopric (1530–1531). In the north, Protestant centers in Porrentruy and the Laufental finally died out around 1580. The bishop of Basel established himself in Porrentruy from 1528, and the chapter of Moutier-Grandval took refuge in Delémont (1534). In 1555, taking advantage of the vacancy of the episcopal see, the subjects of the Delémont valley and the Franche Montagne concluded treaties of combourgeoisie with the city of Basel. Unable to oppose this, prince-bishop Melchior de Lichtenfels negotiated with the 13 free villages of the Delémont valley a new customary (1562) to regulate usage rights in forests. In contrast, Jakob Christoph Blarer von Wartensee vigorously fought aspirations for emancipation. He had the combourgeoisies with Basel suppressed and negotiated lasting arrangements with his subjects: the Treaty of Delémont with the Franche Montagne des Bois (1595), a new police ordinance of Porrentruy (1598), revision of the old Ajoie roll (1601).

During the Thirty Years' War, between 1634 and 1640, the northern part of the bishopric suffered numerous exactions perpetrated in turn by mercenary troops in the service of Sweden, France, and the Empire. The modernization of the state, pursued in the 18th century in the spirit of enlightened despotism, clashed with secular franchises and customs. The ordinances of 1726 reforming the administration of the bishopric triggered the Troubles (1730–1740), whose diplomatic consequence was a rapprochement with France (mutual defense treaty of 1739, renewed in 1780).

== Revolutionary period and annexation to France (1792-1815) ==
The French Revolution had profound repercussions in the Prince-Bishopric of Basel, inscribed in France's political, military, economic, and cultural orbit. Popular unrest, with the city of Porrentruy as its center, did not immediately lead to the fall of the princely regime. The flight of the prince-bishop shortly preceded the occupation of the country by French volunteer battalions in April 1792. The presence of these troops encouraged the revolutionary movement, led by Joseph-Antoine Rengguer, syndic of the Estates of the bishopric (spokesman of the Assembly of Estates to the prince-bishop), and Jean-Baptiste-Joseph Gobel, coadjutor bishop, to whom the notables of Porrentruy and Delémont rallied out of opportunism.

The Rauracian Republic was proclaimed on 17 December 1792. However, lacking agreement on the country's future, the assembly of deputies allowed itself to be imposed with annexation to France on 23 March 1793, with the constitution of a department whose chief town was fixed at Porrentruy. The Mont-Terrible was divided into two districts. The district of Porrentruy comprised Ajoie, the Clos du Doubs, and the Franches-Montagnes. That of Delémont, seat of military command, extended over the valley and the Laufental. Extended to the Pays de Montbéliard in March 1797 and to the southern bailiwicks of the bishopric, occupied since December, the department of Mont-Terrible was abolished under the Consulate (1800) and attached to the Haut-Rhin department, with Colmar as chief town. It then formed two arrondissements, each divided into five cantons, with Delémont and Porrentruy as sub-prefectures.

== Incorporation into Canton of Bern (1815-1979) ==
=== The Congress of Vienna and the Act of Reunion ===
The political status of the region was called into question by the fall of the Napoleonic empire. In 1815, the territory of the Prince-Bishopric of Basel, henceforth without a master, was given to Switzerland by the Congress of Vienna and annexed primarily to the Canton of Bern. The Birseck bailiwick and part of that of Pfeffingen were attributed to Basel. The European powers intended thereby to push France's border westward, grant Bern compensation for the loss of the Pays de Vaud and Aargau, and suppress a state governed by an ecclesiastic. On 21 December in Delémont, federal commissioner Johann Conrad Escher handed over the territory of the former Prince-Bishopric of Basel to representatives of the restored patrician Bernese republic.

The Act of Reunion of 14 November 1815, negotiated and signed in Bienne between Bernese and Jurassian delegations, guaranteed the Catholic religion as public worship in communes where it was established. It also provided for the abolition of French civil and penal codes as well as the restoration of bourgeoisies. The suppression of tithes and feudal rents, replaced by land tax under the Republic, was confirmed.

The territory of the future Canton Jura constituted essentially the Catholic and French-speaking part of the Bernese Jura. Also designated as Jura-Nord, it was distributed among four of the five bailiwicks (Ämter) that then subdivided the Leberberg (Jura in German) annexed by Bern: the bailiwick of Delémont, of which the Laufental (German-speaking and predominantly Catholic) was part until 1846, extended over almost the entire valley; that of Porrentruy comprised Ajoie and five of the eight communes of the former prévôté of Saint-Ursanne, the other three joining the bailiwick of Franches-Montagnes; finally, in the bailiwick of Moutier were found the eight Catholic communes that would opt for Canton Jura in 1975, as well as those of Vellerat and Moutier which would join it in 1996 and 2026. Jura-Sud, which remained in Canton Bern after 1978, constituted the Protestant part of the Bernese Jura (bailiwicks then districts of Moutier and Courtelary and, from 1846, the district of La Neuveville).

=== Constitutional conflicts and the Kulturkampf ===
The clergy and bourgeoisies accommodated themselves to the Restoration regime. However, an intellectual elite, including Xavier Stockmar, Jules Thurmann, and Auguste Quiquerez, considering that Bern endangered the provisions of the 1815 Act of Reunion, aspired to the creation of a territory independent of Bern. It was around 1830 that the terms "Jura question" and "separatism" appeared. Encouraged by the July Revolution of 1830 in Paris, the liberals of Porrentruy actively participated in the movement that overthrew the Bernese patriciate.

The liberal Constitution of 1831 established representative democracy and transformed the bailiwicks into districts, whose prefects would be designated by the Executive Council and a committee of the Grand Council until 1894 and elected thereafter by the people. However, its implementation also called into question the principles of the Jura's union with Bern, guaranteed by the Federal Diet. Obeying the bishop of the new Roman Catholic Diocese of Basel, reorganized in 1828, the Catholics of the Jura opposed measures aimed at secularizing public education and placing the Church under state supervision. In 1832, priests refused to swear an oath to the Constitution without the approval of the Holy See, which was ultimately granted. In 1834, the establishment in Porrentruy of a normal school of the Jura, confessionally mixed, met with strong opposition. The adoption in 1836 by the Bernese Grand Council of the Baden Articles, subjecting the Catholic Church to the control of diocesan states, provoked a popular uprising. The Bernese army intervened in the Catholic Jura to restore order. French interference ended the conflict, however, and Bern renounced applying the Baden Articles.

With the establishment of the radical regime, tension between supporters of the state and defenders of Catholic Church rights increased. Confrontations multiplied over both educational policy and religious questions. They culminated in the 1870s with the crisis of the Kulturkampf, whose episodes profoundly marked collective memory. At the end of the century, the divide between liberal-radicals and Catholic-conservatives strengthened through electoral struggles and press polemics opposing Le Démocrate to its competitor Le Pays. Their divisions did not prevent these enemies from presenting a united front to defend regional interests, jointly supporting the maintenance of French legislation and bourgeoisies as well as railway construction.

=== Political evolution in the 20th century ===
The establishment of the Socialist Party at the beginning of the 20th century, then that of the Peasants, Artisans, and Citizens' Party (PAB, future Swiss People's Party) after World War I, modified the political balance of power, especially to the detriment of the Liberal-Radical Party. In the 1950s, the Jura question and the socialist surge in the district of Delémont provoked a split of the Catholic-conservatives in 1957, who divided between a Conservative Christian-Social Party (from 1971 Christian Democratic Party; from 2021 The Centre) and the Independent Christian-Social Party (PCSI). Initially rather conservative, the Jurassian electorate showed itself more progressive from the second half of the 20th century, approving projects refused by the Swiss people, notably women's suffrage (1959), anti-atomic initiatives (1962, 1963), the right to housing (1970), and a more social health insurance (1974). In 1959, Jura-Nord massively supported the initiative of the Rassemblement Jurassien for the organization of a self-determination plebiscite, ultimately lost. On 23 June 1974, it very largely approved (74% yes) the creation of a Canton of Jura, accepted by the people of the seven districts with just under 52% yes.

=== Demographic and economic changes ===
In 1818, some 34,000 people were counted in the territory of the future Canton Jura, which had nearly 65,000 inhabitants at its entry into sovereignty (1979). The migration balance, chronically negative, suffices to explain this increase of 91%, relatively modest compared to the Swiss average (250%). Immigration of Bernese peasants and German-speaking or foreign workers in the 19th century, and Italian and Spanish workers from the 1960s, did not compensate for the emigration of young Jurassians. Evolution varied by district. That of Delémont (251%) was in the Swiss average. Those of Porrentruy (51%) and Franches-Montagnes (28%) progressed in the 19th century but declined in the 20th century.

Migration movements significantly modified the population's composition. The proportion of bourgeois domiciled in their commune of origin diminished strongly while linguistic and religious minorities grew. At the turn of the 20th century, German speakers represented a quarter of the population of the Delémont district but less than 10% in the other two. Progression of French, strong decline of German, and appearance of Italian and Spanish minorities marked the second half of the 20th century. On the religious level, the Protestant community went from 2% in 1850 to 12% in 1910, 17% in 1950, and 15% in 1970. Temples were built in Delémont (1865), Porrentruy (1891), Saignelégier (1913), Bassecourt (1945), and chapels in Miécourt (1909), Courrendlin (1930), and Boncourt (1940). In the second half of the 19th century, Jews from Alsace, fleeing the last pogroms, settled in the Jurassian arc from Basel to La Chaux-de-Fonds. In the Jura, they formed two communities around the synagogues of Porrentruy (1874) and Delémont (1911).

Socio-economic transformations also modified the spatial distribution of the population, which tended to concentrate in industrial zones well served by train. In 1970, 17 localities of more than 1,000 inhabitants gathered 70% (39% in 1818) of Jurassians, of which 32% (10% in 1818) resided in Delémont or Porrentruy. In the Franches-Montagnes, where habitation is very dispersed, demographic decline in the 20th century occurred mainly to the detriment of hamlets, several of which exceeded one hundred inhabitants in the 19th century.

In 1815, more than half of the active population in Ajoie, the Clos du Doubs, and the Delémont valley worked in the primary sector: agriculture, horse breeding, and especially cattle. In the mid-19th century, there were still about a hundred mills, sawmills, and threshers as well as about ten tanneries, whose activities were linked to rural necessities and forest exploitation. Pottery in Bonfol, faience in Cornol, tobacco manufacture in Boncourt (Burrus), and silk weaving at home in the Delémont district completed the range of artisanal activities.

In the first half of the 19th century, watchmaking spread through the villages and hamlets of the Franches-Montagnes. It took root in Ajoie from the 1840s and after 1870 in the Delémont valley, where the iron industry was in decline after experiencing a remarkable boom in the mid-century. To the three old blast furnaces of Courrendlin, Undervelier, and Bellefontaine were added those of Delémont (1838), Choindez (1846), and Les Rondez (1855). At its peak in 1858, Jurassian metallurgy employed some 1,800 miners, smelters, blacksmiths, carters, woodcutters, and charcoal burners. But strong foreign competition led to the closure of foundries, except those of Choindez and Les Rondez, which would offer some 1,000 jobs during the 20th century under Von Roll's direction.

The construction of Jurassian railways (1872–1877) connected Ajoie and the Delémont valley to French and Swiss railway networks. Replacing Basel after the annexation of Alsace by the German Empire (1871), Porrentruy became an important border station with France. Regions left aside from the base network, formed by the Bienne-Delémont-Basel and Delémont-Porrentruy-Delle lines, integrated into the SBB in 1903 with those of the Jura-Simplon railways, made great efforts to also be served by train. Opened in 1892, the La Chaux-de-Fonds-Saignelégier connection was extended to Glovelier in 1904 and to Tramelan via Le Noirmont in 1913. The line inaugurated between Porrentruy and Bonfol in 1901 was connected to the Alsatian network in 1910. These lines were united in the Chemins de fer du Jura (CJ) company in 1944. Upper Ajoie and the Val Terbi had to wait until the 1920s to see postal buses replace stagecoaches. From the 1960s, the Jurassian population demanded the construction of a transjurane motorway, whose route was only inscribed in the national roads network in 1984.

In the first half of the 20th century, Jurassian industry, with a clear horological predominance, found other niches: textiles in Ajoie, bicycles and motorcycles in Courfaivre (Condor), Delémont cutlery (Wenger), and a metallurgical factory in Saint-Ursanne. The share of the active population in the secondary sector almost doubled between 1860 and 1970, going from one-third to 60%, while agriculture fell from 50 to 10%. However, the Jurassian economy remained fragile. Its industry was insufficiently diversified, with half of the active workers employed in watchmaking and a quarter in metallurgy and mechanics, and high-tech industries as well as the tertiary sector were under-represented.

Toward the end of the 19th century, a working class formed, first in the cities of Delémont and Porrentruy, where industrial development concentrated production in factories. The development of commercial activities and services also multiplied the number of employees, teachers, and civil servants. Trade unionism took root in watchmaking, metallurgy, and among railway workers at the beginning of the 20th century, at the same time as the Socialist Party and a Christian-social movement appeared. The latter was part of the very dense associative network established by the Catholic clergy and conservative party leaders to supervise religious practice and political life. Catholic Jura annually and publicly manifested its faith during Corpus Christi processions and through its participation in the festivals of Notre-Dame du Vorbourg.

The traditional sociability of the "time of evening gatherings" and peasant mentality receded. From the mid-19th century, the development of public education (primary and secondary schools, normal school for male teachers in Porrentruy in 1834 and that for female teachers in Delémont in 1846, cantonal school of Porrentruy in 1856, and vocational schools later), the rise of the associative movement (mutual and agricultural associations, musical, cultural, and sports societies, professional, trade union, and political organizations), and the advent of a regional press (Le Jura, Le Pays, Le Démocrate) contributed to the broadening of knowledge and the changing of human relations. The evolution toward the modern world, which accelerated in the 20th century, led to the disappearance of patois, symbol of a rural society and its oral tradition. First of the great regional associations, the Société jurassienne d'émulation was founded in 1847 to defend French culture and promote the literary and scientific productions of its members.

== The Jura separatist movement ==
The advent of Canton Jura is part of the development of the Jura question since 1947. After World War II, a separatist movement campaigned for the secession of Jura from Canton Bern. The movement was characterized by a long and partly militant struggle, which included some arson attacks by the youth organization Les Béliers. On 23 June 1974, with 90% participation, the Jurassian people of the seven districts accepted the creation of a Canton of Jura by 36,802 yes votes against 34,057 no and 1,726 blank ballots. This vote of self-determination constitutes the founding act of the Jurassian state. On 16 March 1975, the southern districts decided to remain in Canton Bern, opening the way for the cascade plebiscites provided for by the Bernese constitutional amendment of 1970, which took place during this year. At the end of this process, the future cantonal territory was limited to the three districts with separatist majorities (Porrentruy, Delémont, and Franches-Montagnes), increased by eight communes from the Moutier district (Châtillon, Corban, Courchapoix, Courrendlin, Lajoux, Les Genevez, Mervelier, and Rossemaison) and diminished by two small communes from the Delémont district (Roggenburg and Rebévelier), which joined Canton Bern.

From the summer of 1975, the delegation of the future canton to the Grand Council of Bern formed a group positioning itself as the privileged interlocutor of federal and Bernese authorities for safeguarding Jurassian interests until the canton's entry into sovereignty. On 11 December 1975, the Order of Jurassian Lawyers presented a draft constitution, quickly adopted as a basis for discussion by political parties and the Rassemblement Jurassien (RJ). Seeking to maintain control of the future state's construction process, the RJ set up a coordination commission that would strongly influence the organization and work of the Constituent Assembly.

== Creation of the Canton (1974-1978) ==
The results of the election to the Constituent Assembly (21 March 1976) confirmed the balance of power. They marked the personal success of the main leaders of the RJ, including Roland Béguelin and Roger Schaffter, and the failure of non-conformist lists. The 50 seats, contested by 11 formations presenting 529 candidates, were divided among Christian Democrats (19), Liberal-Radicals (11), Socialists (10), Independent Christian-Socials (7), Democrats of the Centre (2), and Reformist Radicals (1). Valentine Friedli was the only woman elected. Solemnly inaugurated on 12 April 1976, the work of the Constituent Assembly concluded on 3 February 1977. The fundamental charter of the Republic and Canton of Jura was adopted unanimously by the delegation and ratified by the people with 80% of voters on 20 March 1977.

The Constitution of the new canton was notably distinguished by recognition of the rights to work, housing, and strike. It also charged the state with promoting full employment, the principle of equal treatment between men and women, as well as the integration of migrants and persons with disabilities. It gave the Cantonal Bank the mission of supporting the state's economic policy. Its article 44, instituting an office for the status of women, also represented an innovation in Switzerland at the time.

Duly mandated, the Constituent Assembly legislated by provisionally maintaining Bernese legislation, except for provisions contrary to the Jurassian Constitution. It developed the organizational chart of the future state's administration and signed agreements on the terms of division of property with Canton Bern. In September 1977, the Federal Chambers granted their guarantee to the Constitution of Canton Jura, with the exception of article 138 providing for the possibility of uniting with the new canton all or part of the Jura that remained Bernese if it regularly detached itself. On 24 September 1978, the Swiss people (82% yes) and all the cantons ratified the creation of Canton Jura by accepting modification of the Federal Constitution in this sense. In November, the Jurassian people adopted the first cantonal laws and elected the Parliament and Government. Two Council of States members, one Christian Democrat and one Socialist, were elected tacitly in December. After the Constituent Assembly handed over its powers to the newly elected Government and Parliament during its last session on 6 December, the Republic and Canton of Jura, Switzerland's 26th canton, entered into sovereignty on 1 January 1979.

== Post-independence developments ==
=== The "State of combat" and political evolution ===
The creation of the new canton did not definitively settle the Jura question. In the Jura that remained Bernese (Bernese Jura), the autonomist movement continued the struggle with the support of the Jurassian state, officially favorable to reunification. However, from the entry into sovereignty, the Government and the Rassemblement Jurassien diverged on strategy. For the former, it was necessary to integrate into the Swiss political system and seek dialogue with the Confederation. The latter, led by Roland Béguelin, aimed to establish a "State of combat." Under its pressure, the Jurassian executive canceled the demonstration planned for 11 May 1979 in Delémont to celebrate the advent of the new Swiss canton in the presence of federal and cantonal authorities. The event marked the beginning of their rupture. Torn by a violent internal crisis in subsequent years, the RJ could not prevent the cantonal authorities' decision to participate in CH 91, the set of events intended to commemorate the 700th anniversary of the Confederation. It nevertheless obtained from the Government and Parliament the payment of 300,000 francs to a foundation for reunification. Developed at its request, the cantonal law on the political unity of Jura was adopted by the people in September 1992, despite a negative opinion from the Federal Tribunal. The Bernese Executive Council judged this decision contrary to the dialogue established between the two cantons in March 1992 through the Consultative Commission (also designated by the name of its president, former national councilor Sigmund Widmer) of the Federal Council, whose intervention it requested.

The Widmer report of April 1993 advocated a solution to the Jura question through the creation in two stages of a new canton formed by Jura and the current Bernese Jura. Bilateral negotiations, conducted under the aegis of the Federal Council, led to the tripartite agreement (Confederation-Jura-Bern) of 25 March 1994 creating the Interjurassian Assembly (AIJ). The AIJ, whose seat was fixed at Moutier, was formed of a Bernese delegation and a Jurassian delegation, of 12 members each. The presidency was occupied successively by former Federal Councilor from Neuchâtel René Felber (1994–1997), former national councilor from Vaud Jean-François Leuba (1997–2003), former State Councilor from Valais Serge Sierro (2003–2010), and former Council of States member from Ticino Dick Marty (2011–2017). It was organized into six commissions (institutions; education and training; economy; public health and social affairs; transport, communications, and planning; culture). Decisions, taken by double majority of the two delegations, mainly took the form of resolutions addressed to the two governments, generally inviting them to consultation, intercantonal cooperation, or joint achievements for both parts of the Jura. Resolution No. 44 of 20 December 2000, politically major for resolving the Jura question, submitted to the cantonal executives a process in two phases (establishment of cooperation instruments, then Interjurassian collaboration).

Charged by the cantons of Jura and Bern with conducting a study on the institutional future of the Interjurassian region, the AIJ published its final report in 2009. One of the paths proposed for settling the Jura question was the reunification of Jura through the creation of a new canton with six districts. In 2013, the electorate of Canton Jura overwhelmingly supported this project with 76.6% yes, while that of the Bernese Jura clearly rejected it with 71.8% no, Moutier being the exception with 55% yes. This result meant abandoning the idea of a new canton. The declaration of intent signed in 2012 by the Jurassian and Bernese governments nevertheless provided, in case of rejection by one of the two parties, the possibility of organizing votes in Bernese Jura communes that requested it within two years, with a view to possible attachment to Canton Jura. Votes took place in 2017 in Belprahon and Sorvilier, which refused this attachment, and in Moutier which accepted it (51.7% yes). The communalist process completed, the agreement of 25 March 1994 was denounced and the AIJ, whose role was finished, dissolved on 10 November 2017.

=== Recent developments ===
The Jura question experienced a new rebound. Following appeals, Moutier's vote was invalidated in 2018 by the prefecture of the administrative district of Bernese Jura, a decision against which Moutier's executive appealed in turn. In 2019, the administrative court of Canton Bern confirmed the annulment of the vote on Moutier's attachment to Canton Jura. Finally, on 28 March 2021, through a repetition of the vote of 18 June 2017, Moutier's population renewed its choice to leave Canton Bern to join Canton Jura by 54.9% yes (entry into force in 2026).

Since 1996, when Vellerat joined Canton Jura, the question of the Jura region has remained controversial. In 2004, a federal commission proposed that the French-speaking southern Jura be united with Canton Jura, as the language question appeared more important than the denominational one. A possible solution would be to create two half-cantons, as reunification with the creation of only a single canton would mean a complete restructuring of Jura's current political system, with the cantonal capital being transferred from Delémont to Moutier.
