= Epauvillers =

- Former municipality
- Location of Epauvillers
- Location within Switzerland Location within Canton of Jura
- Coordinates: 47°20′N 07°07′E
- Country: Switzerland
- Canton: Jura
- District: Franches-Montagnes

Area
  - Total: 8.43 km^{2} (3.25 sq mi)
- Elevation: 696 m (2,283 ft)

Population (2003)
  - Total: 147
  - Density: 17.4/km^{2} (45.2/sq mi)
- Time zone: UTC+01:00 (CET)
  - Summer (DST): UTC+02:00 (CEST)
- Postal code: 2885
- SFOS number: 516
- ISO 3166 code: CH-JU
- Surrounded by: Seleute, Saint-Ursanne, Montenol, Montmelon, Saint-Brais, Epiquerez
- Website: SFSO statistics

Epauvillers (Frainc-Comtou: Velès) is a village and former municipality in the district of Franches-Montagnes in the canton of Jura in Switzerland. Since January 1, 2009 it is a part of the new municipality of Clos du Doubs in the Porrentruy District.
