= Clos du Doubs =

- Municipality
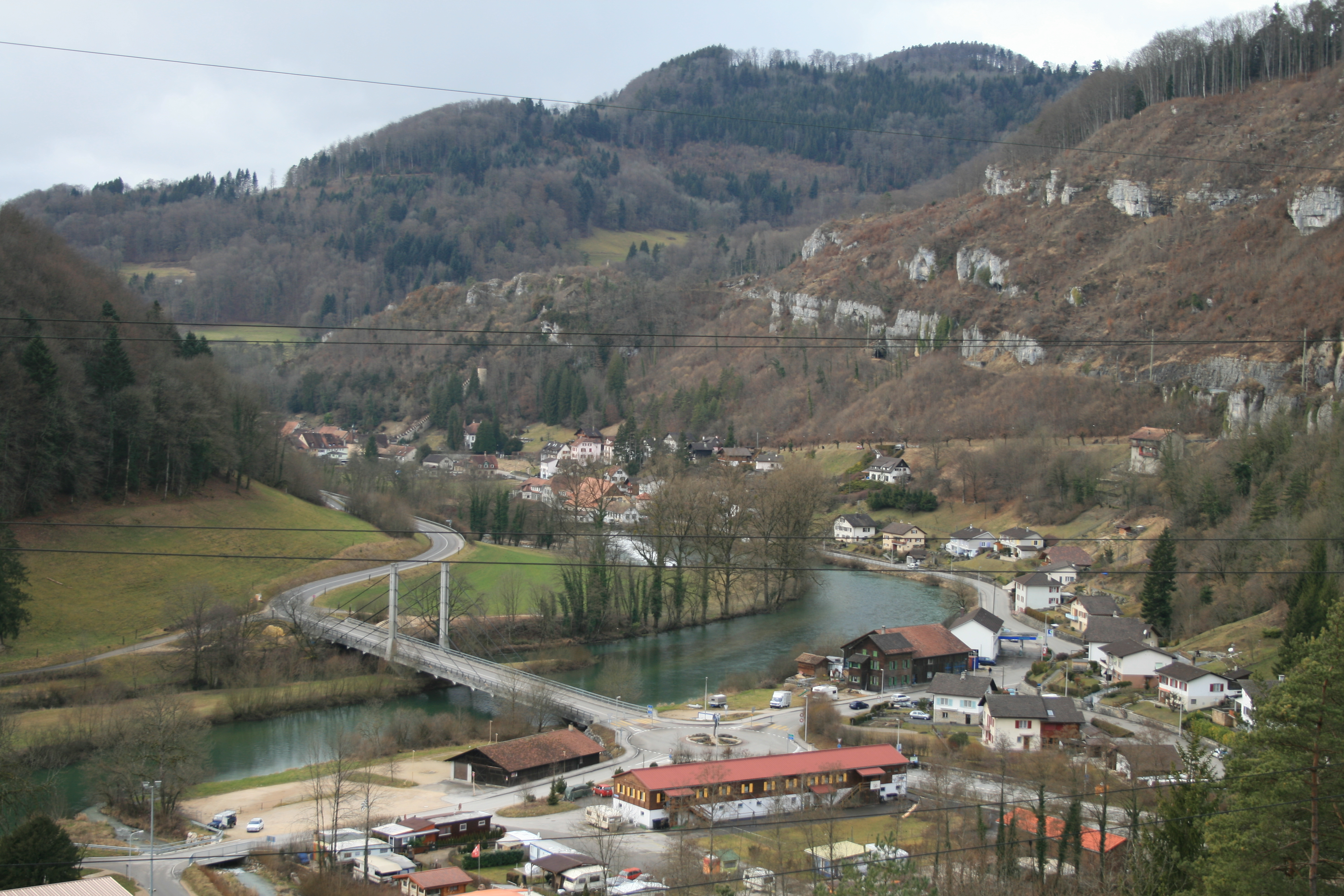
- Clos du Doubs

- Coat of arms
- Location of Clos du Doubs
- Location within Switzerland Location within Canton of Jura
- Coordinates: 47°21′N 07°09′E
- Country: Switzerland
- Canton: Jura
- District: Porrentruy

Government
  - Executive: Conseil communal with 7 members
  - Mayor: Maire; Yves Charmillot (as of 2026)

Area
  - Total: 61.86 km^{2} (23.88 sq mi)
- Elevation: 440 m (1,440 ft)

Population (2000)
  - Total: 1,309
  - Density: 21.16/km^{2} (54.81/sq mi)
- Time zone: UTC+01:00 (CET)
  - Summer (DST): UTC+02:00 (CEST)
- Postal code: 2882
- SFOS number: 6808
- ISO 3166 code: CH-JU
- Localities: Epauvillers, Epiquerez, Montenol, Montmelon, Ocourt, Saint-Ursanne and Seleute
- Surrounded by: Montfaucon, Soubey, Saint-Brais, La Baroche, Glovelier, Boécourt, Cornol, Courgenay, Fontenais, Bressaucourt, Montancy (F), Burnevillers (F)
- Website: https://closdudoubs.ch SFSO statistics

Clos du Doubs (Franc-Comtois: Chôs di Doubs) is a municipality in the district of Porrentruy in the canton of Jura in Switzerland. It was founded on 1 January 2009 by the former municipalities of Epauvillers, Epiquerez, Montenol, Montmelon, Ocourt, Saint-Ursanne and Seleute. Soubey voted not to join the merger.

Clos du Doubs can also refer to a range of the Jura folds south-west of Saint-Ursanne. The new municipality took its name from this regional designation (which also includes Soubey). The region includes the section of the Doubs valley near Saint-Ursanne, about 15 km (9.3 mi) west of Delémont. The region covers about 80 km^{2} (31 mi^{2}), centered on the village of Saint-Ursanne.

== Geography ==
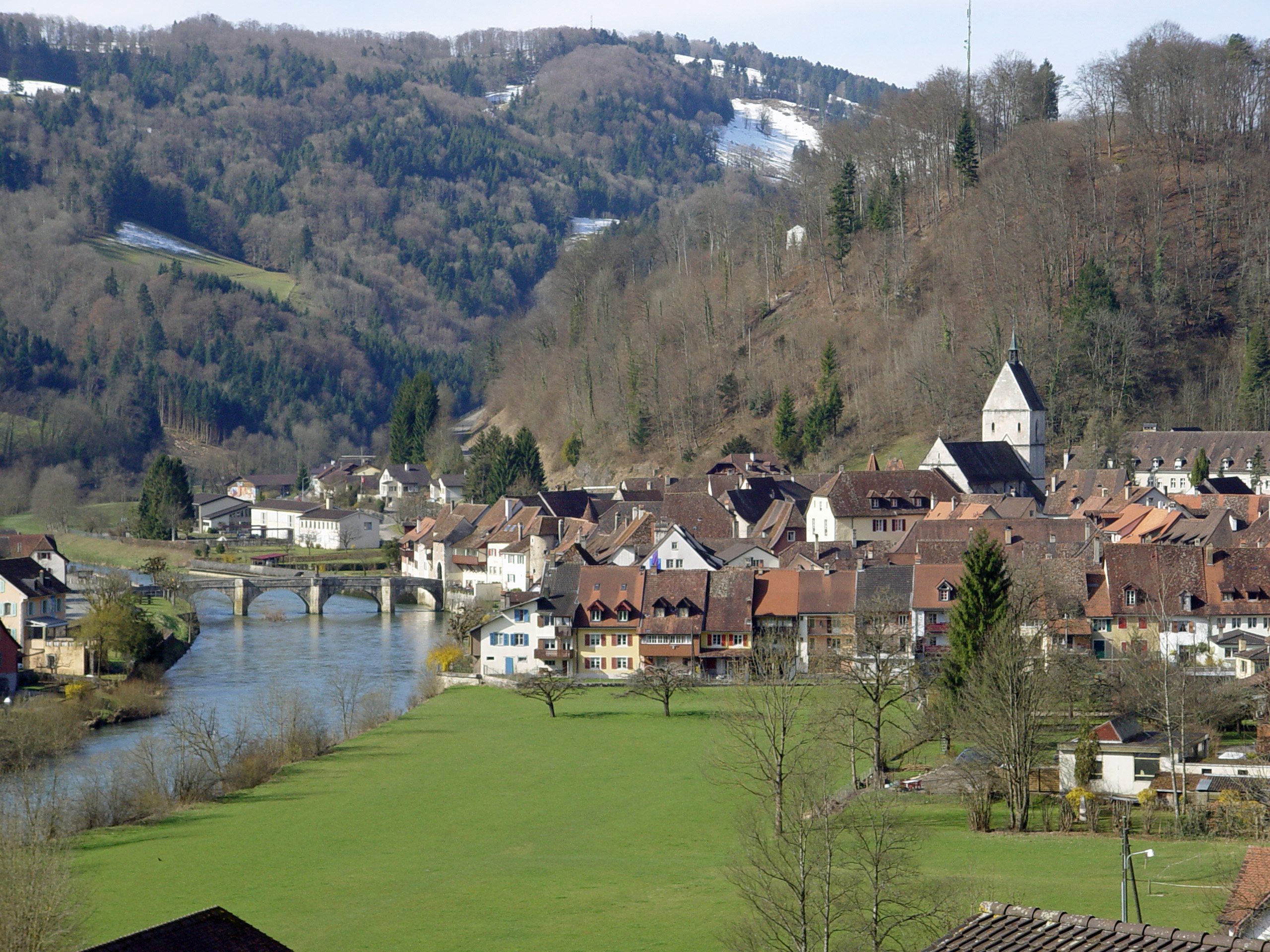
Doubs river at Saint Ursanne

Clos du Doubs has an area of 61.75 km^{2} (23.84 sq mi). Of this area, 26.51 km^{2} (10.24 mi^{2}) or 42.9% is used for agricultural purposes, while 32.21 km^{2} (12.44 mi^{2}) or 52.1% is forested. Of the rest of the land, 2.24 km^{2} (0.86 mi^{2}) or 3.6% is settled (buildings or roads), 0.78 km^{2} (0.30 mi^{2}) or 1.3% is either rivers or lakes and 0.08 km^{2} (20 acres) or 0.1% is unproductive land.

Of the built up area, housing and buildings made up 1.2% and transportation infrastructure made up 2.0%. Out of the forested land, 48.7% of the total land area is heavily forested and 3.4% is covered with orchards or small clusters of trees. Of the agricultural land, 5.7% is used for growing crops and 27.5% is pastures and 9.5% is used for alpine pastures. All the water in the municipality is flowing water.

== Demographics ==
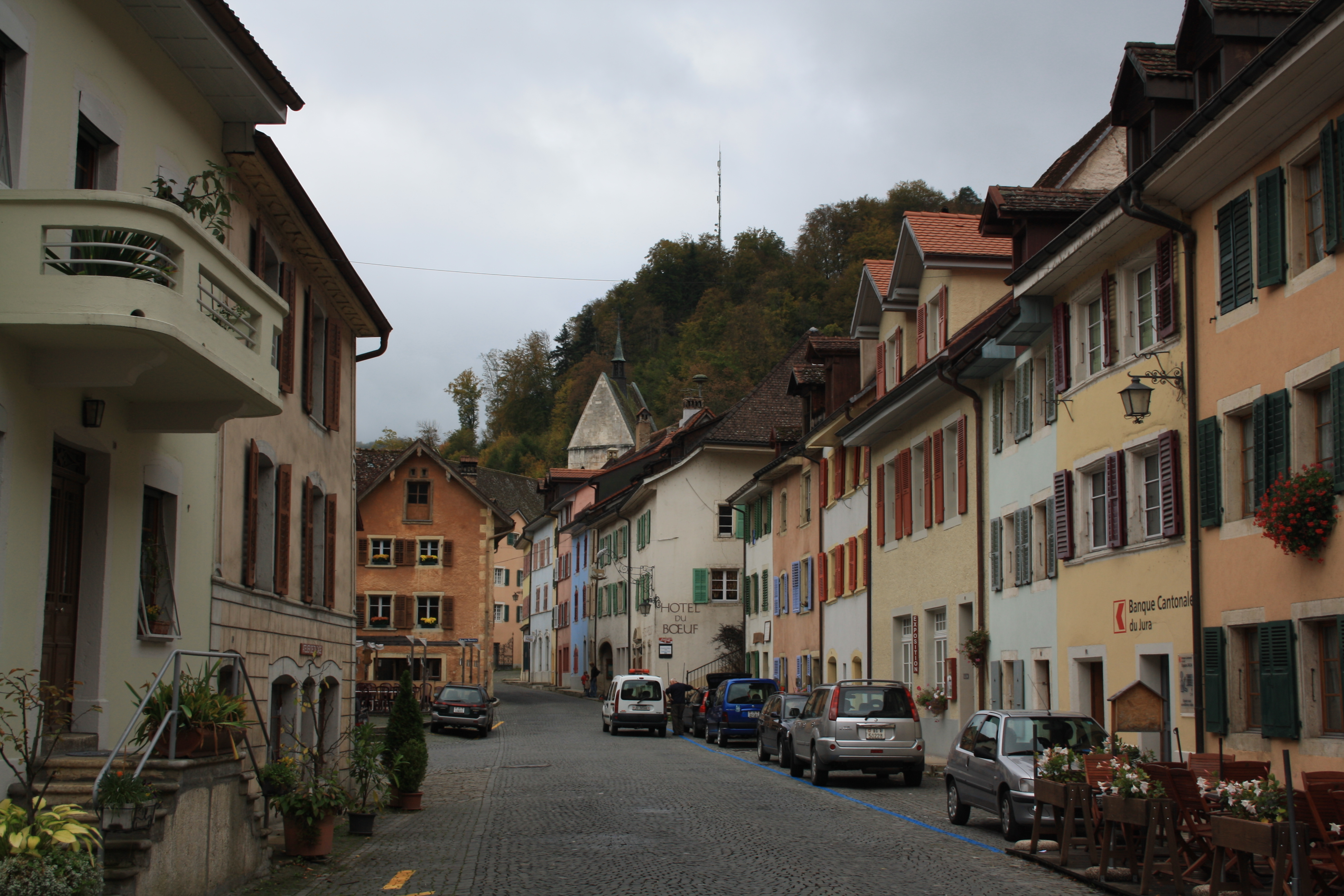
Saint Ursanne town

Clos du Doubs has a population (as of December 2020) of 1,263. As of 2010, 6.6% of the population are resident foreign nationals. Over the last 10 years (2000–2010) the population has changed at a rate of -2.7%. Migration accounted for -1.5%, while births and deaths accounted for -2%.

Most of the population (as of 2000) speaks French (90.5%) as their first language, German is the second most common (6.0%) and Serbo-Croatian is the third (1.1%).

As of 2008, the population was 49.6% male and 50.4% female. The population was made up of 592 Swiss men (46.4% of the population) and 41 (3.2%) non-Swiss men. There were 600 Swiss women (47.0%) and 43 (3.4%) non-Swiss women.

As of 2000, children and teenagers (0–19 years old) make up 23.6% of the population, while adults (20–64 years old) make up 55.1% and seniors (over 64 years old) make up 21.2%.

As of 2009, the construction rate of new housing units was 3.8 new units per 1000 residents. The vacancy rate for the municipality, in 2010, was 1.58%.

== Historic Population ==
The historical population is given in the following chart:

== Heritage sites of national significance ==
The farm house at Chez Danville 5 in Montmelon, Montvoie Castle, the Saint-Ursanne Collegiate church, the fortifications at Saint-Ursanne, the bridge over the Doubs river, and the medieval village of Saint-Ursanne are listed as Swiss heritage site of national significance. The entire village of Saint-Ursanne and the hamlet of Montenol are part of the Inventory of Swiss Heritage Sites.

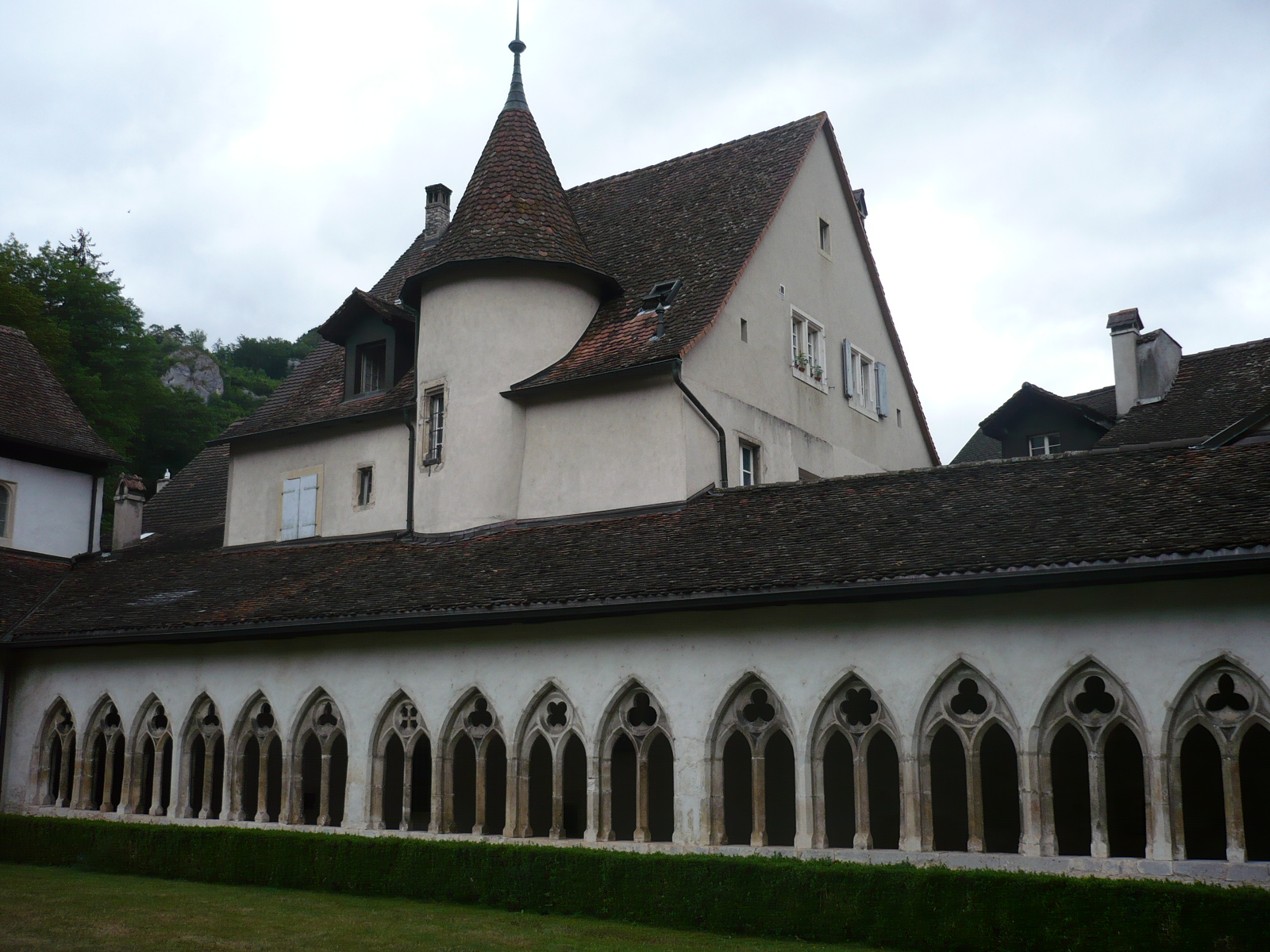
Saint-Ursanne Collegiate church

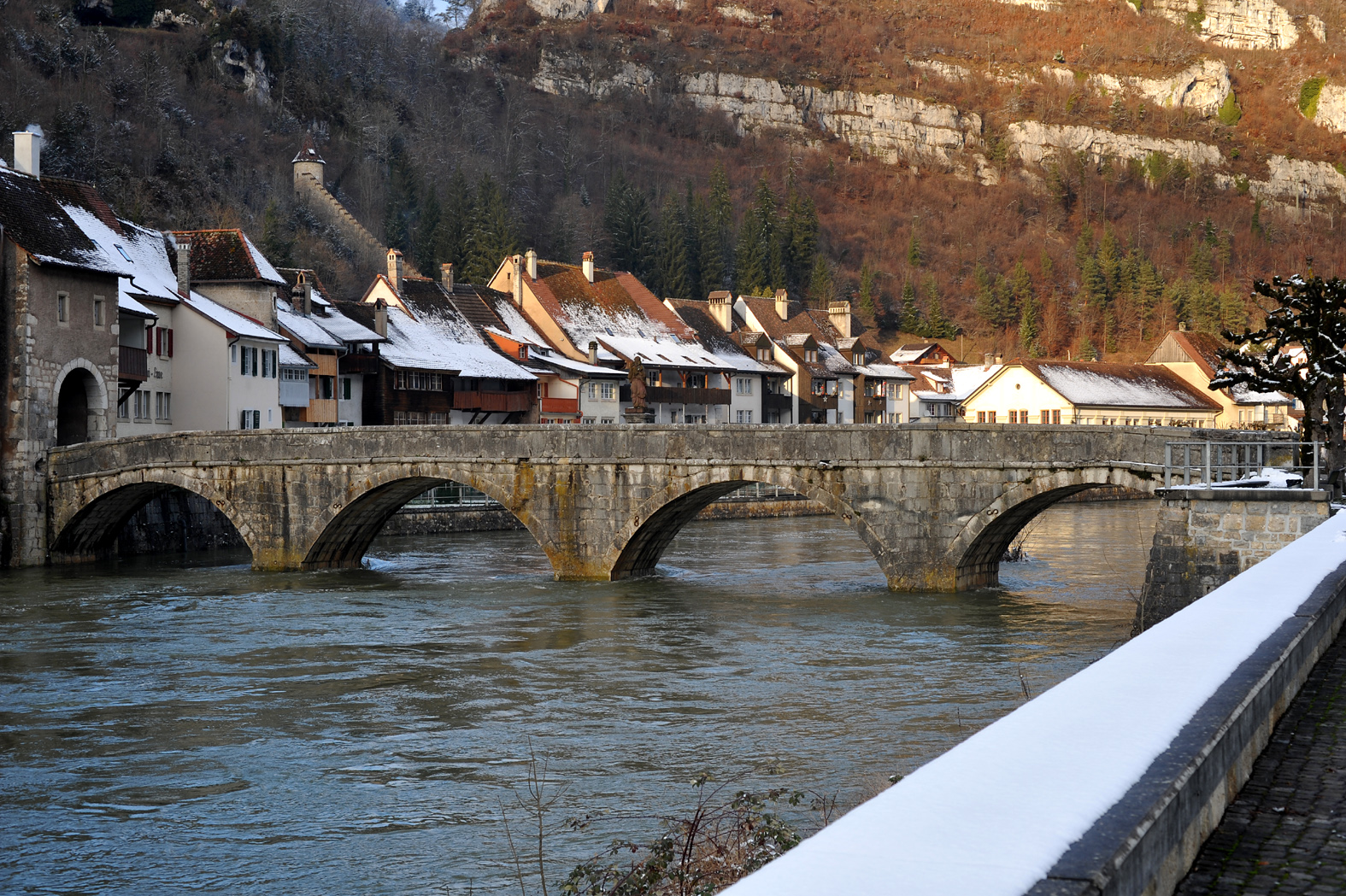
Bridge over the Doubs

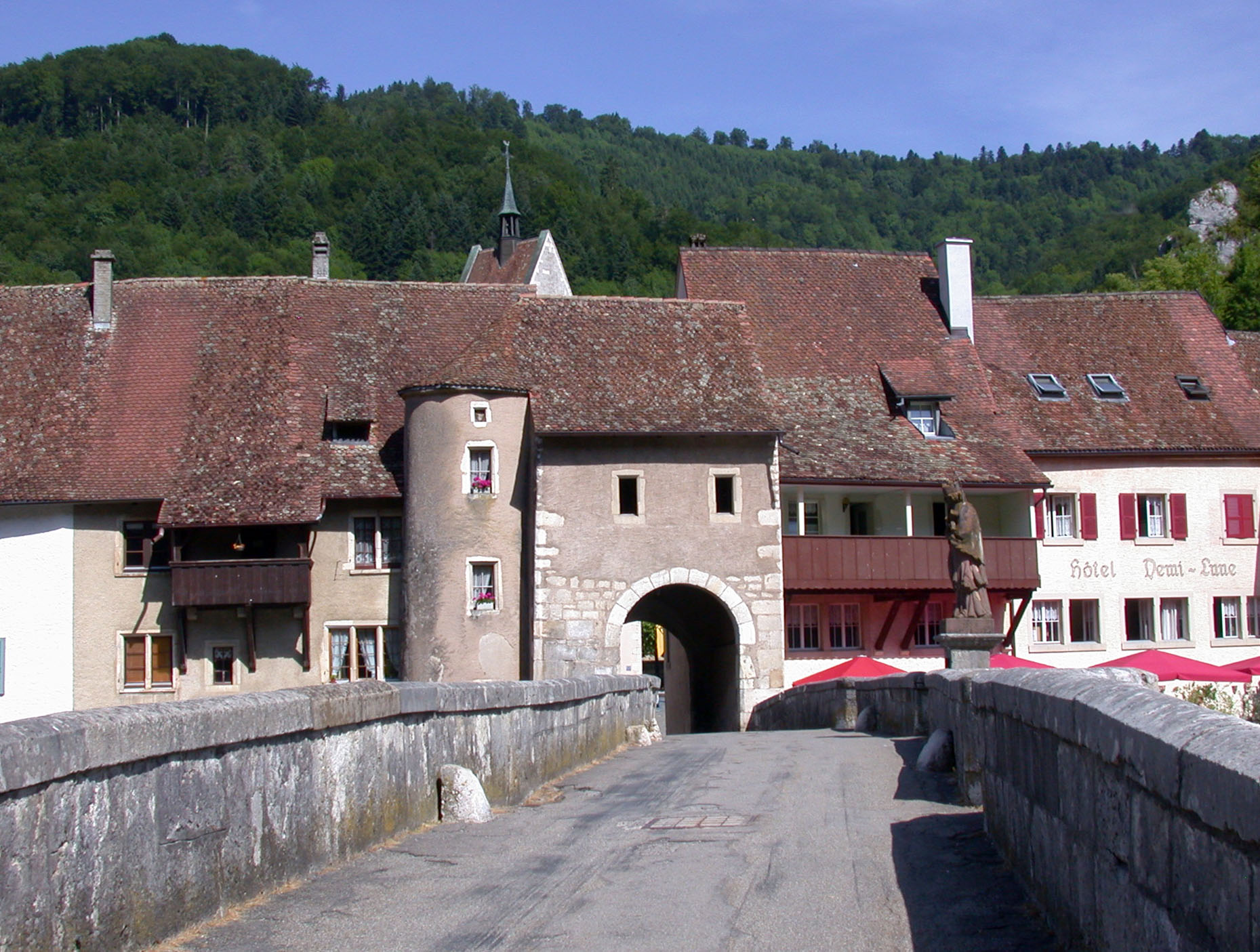
Saint-Ursanne, Medieval Village

== Economy ==
As of 2010, Clos du Doubs had an unemployment rate of 2.9%. As of 2008, there were 227 people employed in the primary economic sector and about 74 businesses involved in this sector. 173 people were employed in the secondary sector and there were 12 businesses in this sector. 349 people were employed in the tertiary sector, with 46 businesses in this sector.

Of the working population, 9% used public transportation to get to work, and 47.9% used a private car.

== Education ==
The Canton of Jura school system provides two year of non-obligatory Kindergarten, followed by six years of Primary school. This is followed by three years of obligatory lower Secondary school where the students are separated according to ability and aptitude. Following the lower Secondary students may attend a three or four year optional upper Secondary school followed by some form of Tertiary school or they may enter an apprenticeship.

During the 2009-10 school year, there were a total of 100 students attending 7 classes in Clos du Doubs. There was one kindergarten class with a total of 16 students in the municipality. The municipality had 6 primary classes and 84 students. There are only nine Secondary schools in the canton, so all the students from Clos du Doubs attend their secondary school in another municipality.

== Transportation ==
The municipality has a railway station, St-Ursanne. It is located on the Delémont–Delle line and has regular service to Biel/Bienne and Meroux (in France).
