= Epiquerez =

- Former municipality
- Location of Epiquerez
- Location within Switzerland Location within Canton of Jura
- Coordinates: 47°20′N 07°03′E
- Country: Switzerland
- Canton: Jura
- District: Franches-Montagnes

Area
  - Total: 9.41 km^{2} (3.63 sq mi)
- Elevation: 878 m (2,881 ft)

Population (2003)
  - Total: 85
  - Density: 9.0/km^{2} (23/sq mi)
- Time zone: UTC+01:00 (CET)
  - Summer (DST): UTC+02:00 (CEST)
- Postal code: 2886
- SFOS number: 6747
- ISO 3166 code: CH-JU
- Surrounded by: Ocourt, Seleute, Epauvillers, Saint-Brais, Montfavergier, Soubey, Burnevillers (F)
- Website: SFSO statistics

Epiquerez is a former municipality in the district of Franches-Montagnes in the canton of Jura in Switzerland. Since January 1, 2009 it is a part of the new municipality of Clos du Doubs in the Porrentruy District.
