= Seleute =

- Former municipality
- Coat of arms
- Location of Seleute
- Location within Switzerland Location within Canton of Jura
- Coordinates: 47°22′N 07°07′E
- Country: Switzerland
- Canton: Jura
- District: Porrentruy

Area
  - Total: 6.81 km^{2} (2.63 sq mi)
- Elevation: 650 m (2,130 ft)

Population (2003)
  - Total: 75
  - Density: 11/km^{2} (29/sq mi)
- Time zone: UTC+01:00 (CET)
  - Summer (DST): UTC+02:00 (CEST)
- Postal code: 2888
- SFOS number: 835
- ISO 3166 code: CH-JU
- Surrounded by: Saint-Ursanne, Montmelon, Epauvillers, Epiquerez, Ocourt, Courgenay
- Website: SFSO statistics

Seleute (Frainc-Comtou: Sleute) is a village and former municipality in the district of Porrentruy in the canton of Jura in Switzerland. Since January 1, 2009 it has been part of the municipality of Clos du Doubs.
