= Saint-Ursanne =

- Former municipality
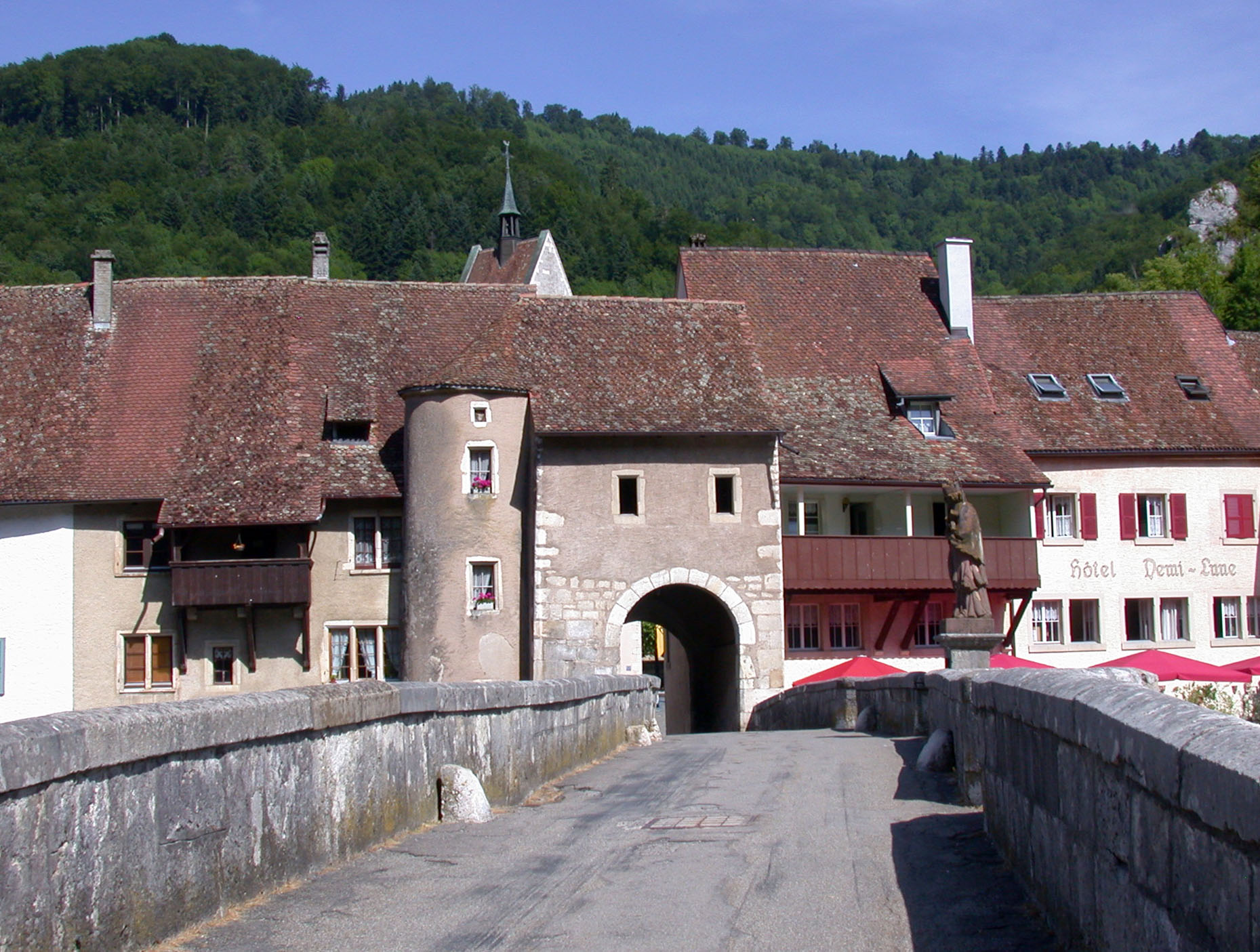
- City gate of Saint-Ursanne

- Coat of arms
- Location of Saint-Ursanne
- Location within Switzerland Location within Canton of Jura
- Coordinates: 47°22′N 7°09′E
- Country: Switzerland
- Canton: Jura
- District: Porrentruy

Area
  - Total: 11.46 km^{2} (4.42 sq mi)
- Elevation: 440 m (1,440 ft)

Population (December 2003)
  - Total: 730
  - Density: 64/km^{2} (160/sq mi)
- Time zone: UTC+01:00 (CET)
  - Summer (DST): UTC+02:00 (CEST)
- Postal code: 2882
- SFOS number: 834
- ISO 3166 code: CH-JU
- Surrounded by: Seleute, Ocourt, Montmelon, Asuel, Montenol, Saint-Brais, Epauvillers
- Twin towns: La Motte, Var (France)
- Website: www.closdudoubs.ch

Saint-Ursanne (Frainc-Comtou: Sïnt-Ouéchanne) is an old town and a former municipality of the district of Porrentruy in the canton of Jura, Switzerland which has preserved much of its medieval character. The town contains many historical buildings, including a Romanesque abbey church, a collegiate church, a cloister, many medieval houses, a hermitage and an 18th-century bridge. The river Doubs makes a loop near Saint-Ursanne before flowing into France. Since 2009 Saint-Ursanne has been a part of the new municipality Clos du Doubs. An active railway station is located above the town, to the east.

The town is famous for the medieval festival which it organizes each summer, and for the annual St-Ursanne–Les Rangiers International Hill Climb in August.

Its name refers to Saint Ursicinus, a seventh-century monk who built a monastery here.

This town received an award as being one of the "best tourism villages" worldwide by UNWTO.

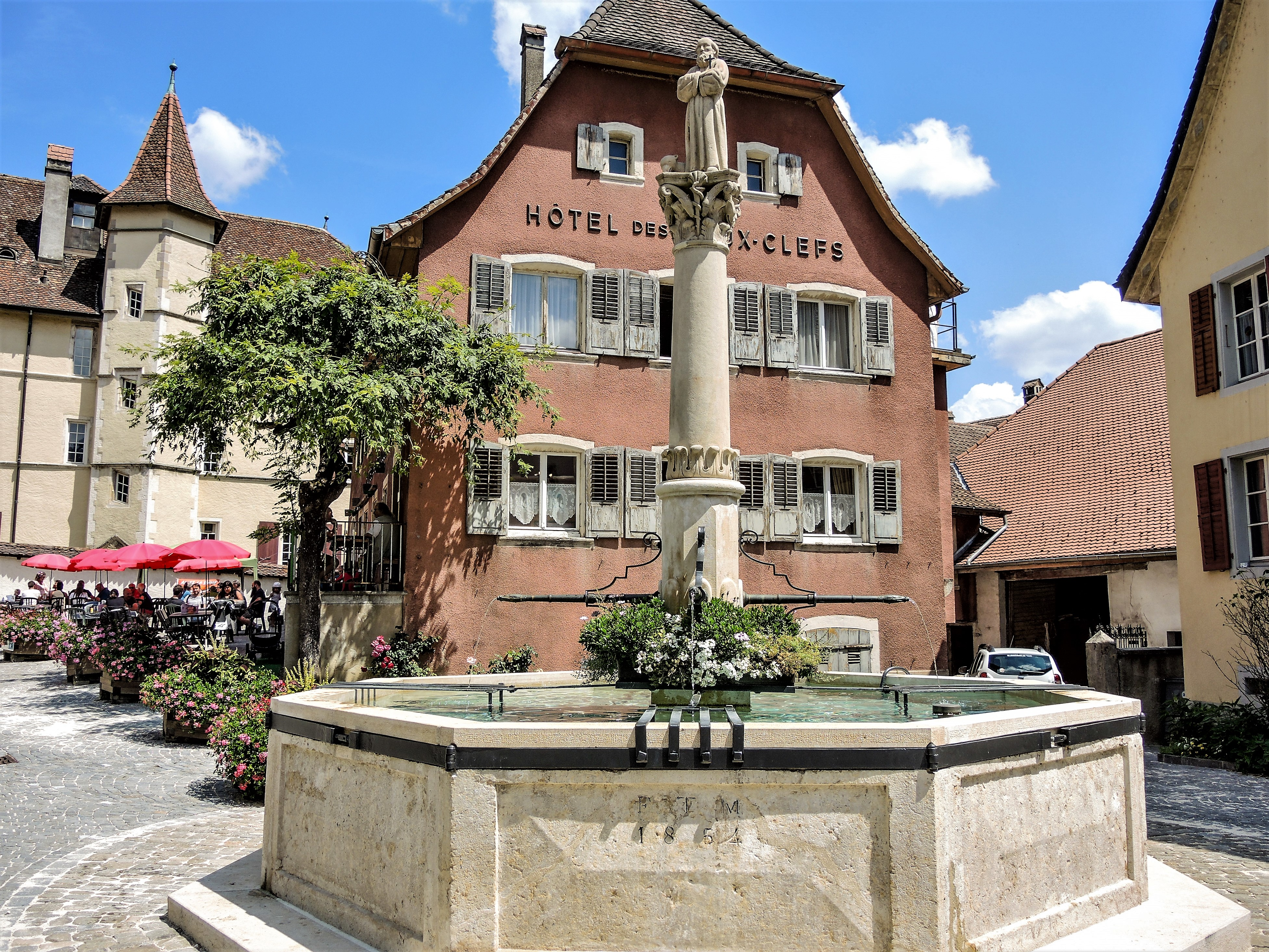
Fountain in the city centre 2018

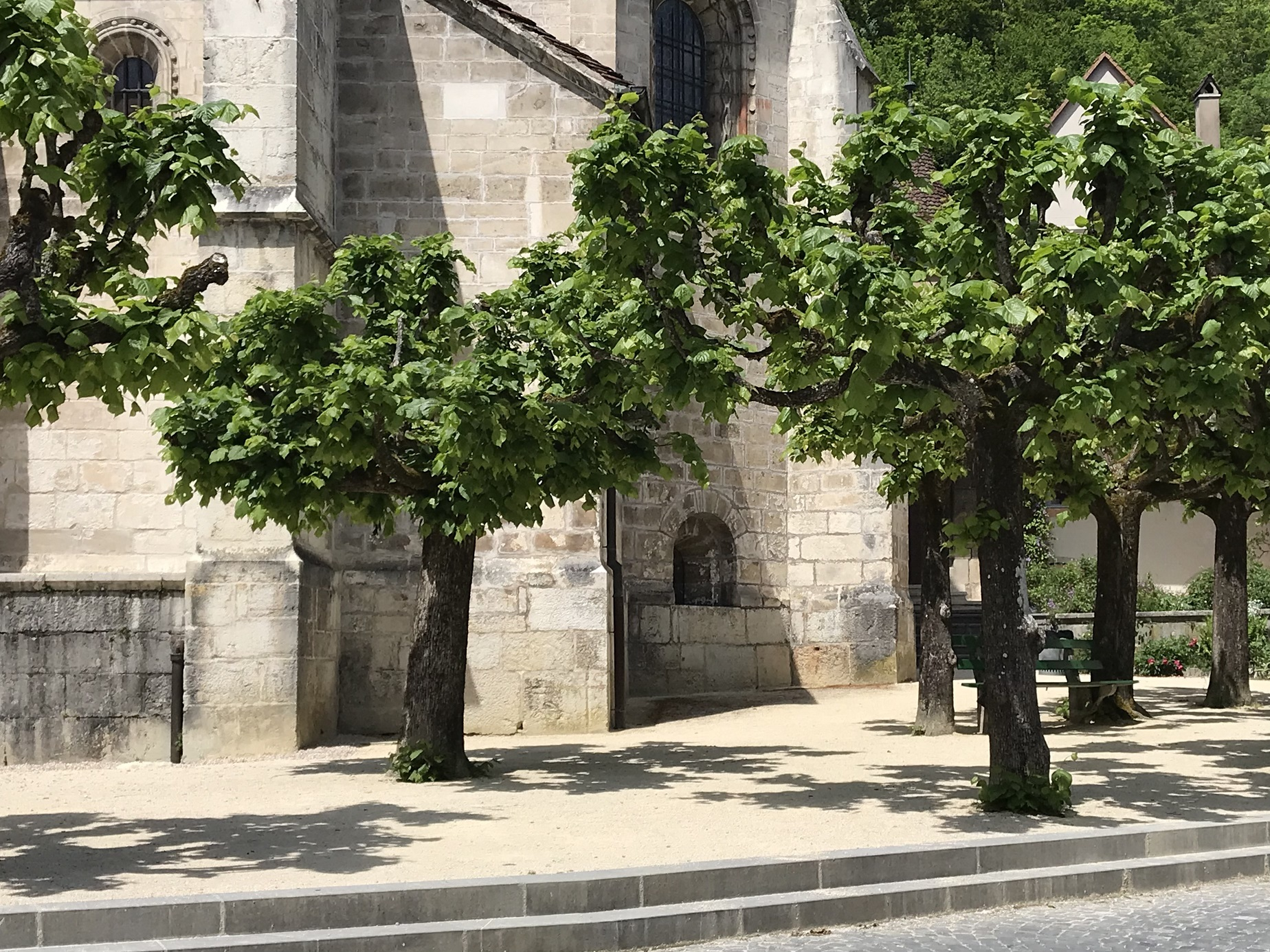
Detail of the abbey 2022

Aerial view 1955

== Notable people ==
- Ursicinus of Saint-Ursanne (7th century), an Irish missionary and hermit, his supposed sarcophagus is preserved in St-Ursanne
- Saint Wandregisel (c. 605–668 AD), a Frankish courtier, monk, and abbot; lived as a hermit in complete solitude at Saint-Ursanne
- Lionel Régal (1975 – 2010 in Saint-Ursanne), a French hillclimbing racer, died in a crash in Saint-Ursanne
- Cathérine Hug (born 1976), an art historian and curator, was brought up in Saint-Ursanne
- Benjamin Conz (born 1991 in Saint-Ursanne), a Swiss professional ice hockey goaltender

== Transport ==
St-Ursanne railway station is located within walking distance to the old town. It is served by S3 service of Basel S-Bahn, which operates between Porrentruy and Olten, via Delémont and Basel SBB.
