= Montmelon =

- Former municipality
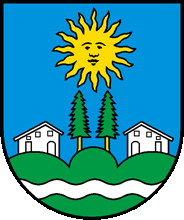
- Coat of arms
- Location of Montmelon
- Location within Switzerland Location within Canton of Jura
- Coordinates: 47°21′N 07°11′E
- Country: Switzerland
- Canton: Jura
- District: Porrentruy

Area
  - Total: 11.97 km^{2} (4.62 sq mi)
- Elevation: 594 m (1,949 ft)

Population (2003)
  - Total: 114
  - Density: 9.52/km^{2} (24.7/sq mi)
- Time zone: UTC+01:00 (CET)
  - Summer (DST): UTC+02:00 (CEST)
- Postal code: 2883
- SFOS number: 827
- ISO 3166 code: CH-JU
- Localities: Montmelon-Dessus, Montmelon-Dessous, Ravines
- Surrounded by: Asuel, Saint-Ursanne, Montenol, Epauvillers, Saint-Brais, Glovelier, Boécourt, Cornol, Courgenay, Seleute, Ocourt
- Website: SFSO statistics

Aerial view (1957)

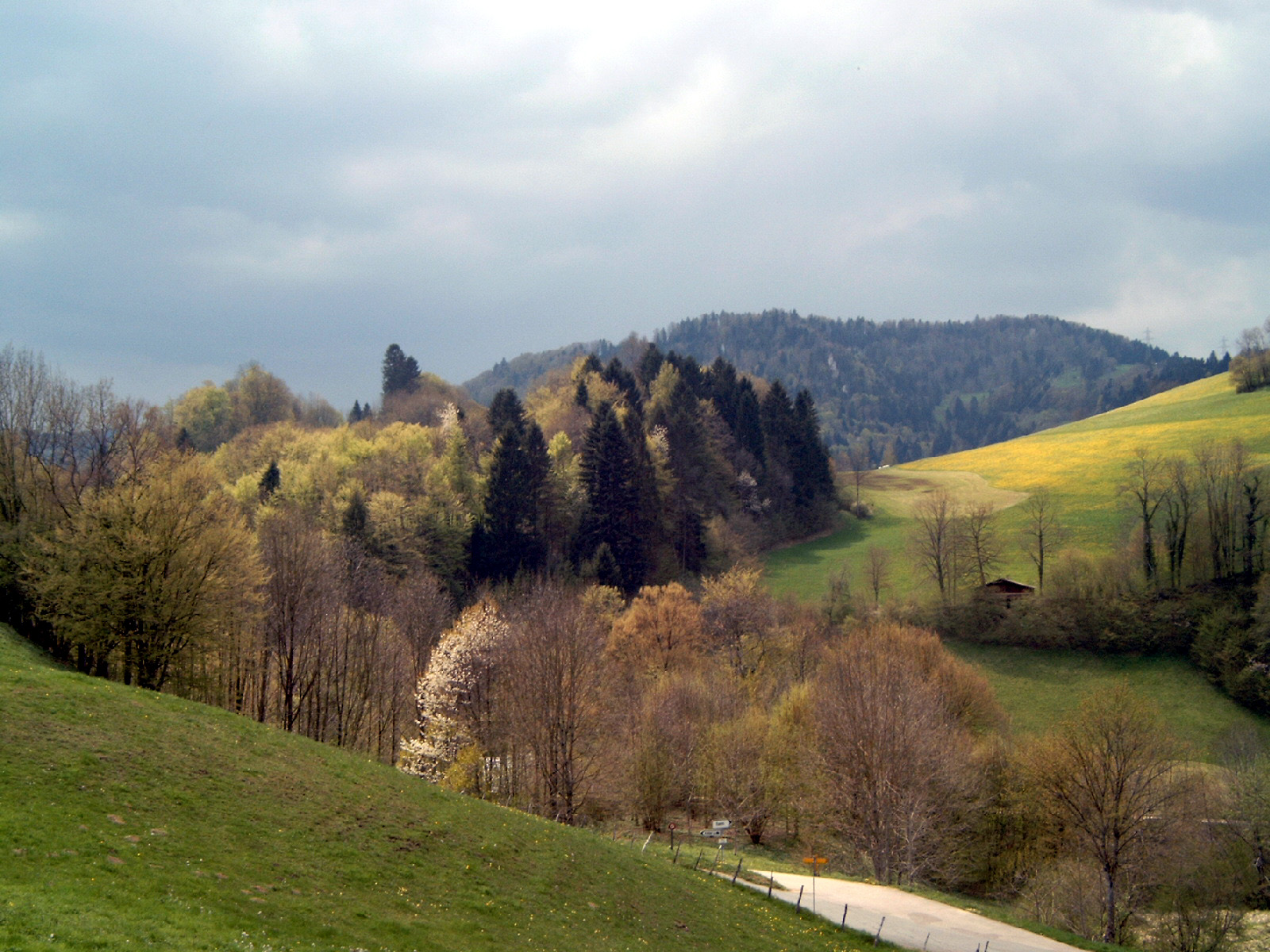
Montmelon, Doubs, Jura in spring.

Montmelon is a village and former municipality in the district of Porrentruy in the canton of Jura in Switzerland.

Since January 1, 2009 it is a part of the new municipality Clos du Doubs.

The municipality was composed of several villages (Montmelon-Dessus, Montmelon-Dessous, Ravines) and of many dispersed farms. The municipality had approximately 100 inhabitants, many of whom are farmers.
