= Franches-Montagnes District =

Coordinates: 47°15′N 6°59′E

Franches-Montagnes District District des Franches-Montagnes
- District
- Flag Coat of arms
- Country: Switzerland
- Canton: Jura
- Capital: Saignelégier

Area
  - Total: 200.18 km^{2} (77.29 sq mi)

Population (2020)
  - Total: 10,479
  - Density: 52.348/km^{2} (135.58/sq mi)
- Time zone: UTC+1 (CET)
  - Summer (DST): UTC+2 (CEST)
- Municipalities: 12

Franches-Montagnes District (German: Freiberge, French: District des Franches-Montagnes, Franc-Comtois: Dichtrict des Fraintches-Montaignes) is one of the four districts of the canton of Jura, Switzerland. Its capital is the town of Saignelégier. The French-speaking district has a population of 10,479 (as of 31 December 2020).

== Municipalities ==
Franches-Montagnes contains a total of 12 municipalities:

Coat of Arms	Municipality	Population (31 December 2020)	Area km^{2}
	Le Bémont	324	11.68
	Les Bois	1,246	24.71
	Les Breuleux	1,528	10.82
	Les Enfers	149	7.12
	Les Genevez	516	13.63
	Lajoux	671	12.38
	Le Noirmont	1,914	20.39
	Montfaucon	572	18.25
	Muriaux	490	16.88
	Saignelégier	2,615	31.67
	Saint-Brais	227	15.16
	Soubey	131	13.49
	Total	10,479	200.18

== Mergers ==
- In 2009 Montfavergier merged into Montfaucon and Le Peuchapatte merged into Muriaux. At the same time, Goumois and Les Pommerats merged into Saignelégier. Also in 2009, Epauvillers and Epiquerez merged into Clos du Doubs of the Porrentruy District.
- In 2023 La Chaux-des-Breuleux merged into Les Breuleux

== Coat of arms ==
The blazon of the district coat of arms is Or, a Roundel Argent bordered Sable and Coupeaux of Six Gules.

== Demographics ==
Franches-Montagnes has a population (as of December 2020) of 10,479.

Most of the population (as of 2000) speaks French (8,975 or 91.9%) as their first language, German is the second most common (431 or 4.4%) and Portuguese is the third (91 or 0.9%). There are 72 people who speak Italian and 4 people who speak Romansh.

As of 2008, the population was 49.7% male and 50.3% female. The population was made up of 4,498 Swiss men (45.1% of the population) and 456 (4.6%) non-Swiss men. There were 4,573 Swiss women (45.9%) and 446 (4.5%) non-Swiss women. Of the population in the district, 4,147 or about 42.5% were born in Franches-Montagnes and lived there in 2000. There were 2,328 or 23.8% who were born in the same canton, while 1,840 or 18.8% were born somewhere else in Switzerland, and 1,031 or 10.6% were born outside of Switzerland.

As of 2000, there were 4,275 people who were single and never married in the district. There were 4,596 married individuals, 524 widows or widowers and 374 individuals who are divorced.

There were 1,073 households that consist of only one person and 409 households with five or more people.

The historical population is given in the following chart:

== Politics ==
In the 2007 federal election the most popular party was the SPS which received 33.99% of the vote. The next three most popular parties were the CSP (21.85%), the CVP (19.47%) and the FDP (13.05%). In the federal election, a total of 3,330 votes were cast, and the voter turnout was 44.6%.

== Religion ==
According to the 2000 census, 8,649 people (88.6% of total population) identified as Christian, with a confessional division of 7,068 (72.4%) were Roman Catholics, 1,102 (11.3%) Reformed (Protestant) and 479 (5%) adherents of other Christian confessions (mostly free churches, but also including 25 members of an Orthodox church and 4 members of the Christian Catholic Church).

750 (7.7% of the population) stated no religious adherence (agnostic or atheist). 480 individuals (or about 4.91% of the population) did not answer the question.

86 (0.9%) people identified as Muslim, 9 as Hindu, 6 as Buddhist, and 7 as adherents of other religious groups.

== Education ==
In Franches-Montagnes about 3,255 or (33.3%) of the population have completed non-mandatory upper secondary education, and 785 or (8.0%) have completed additional higher education (either university or a Fachhochschule). Of the 785 who completed tertiary schooling, 61.9% were Swiss men, 27.3% were Swiss women, 5.4% were non-Swiss men and 5.5% were non-Swiss women.

The Canton of Jura school system provides two year of non-obligatory Kindergarten, followed by six years of Primary school. This is followed by three years of obligatory lower Secondary school where the students are separated according to ability and aptitude. Following the lower Secondary students may attend a three or four year optional upper Secondary school followed by some form of Tertiary school or they may enter an apprenticeship.

During the 2009–10 school year, there were a total of 922 students attending 55 classes in Franches-Montagnes. There were 12 kindergarten classes with a total of 197 students in the district. The district had 43 primary classes and 725 students.
