= Montenol =

- Former municipality
- Location of Montenol
- Location within Switzerland Location within Canton of Jura
- Coordinates: 47°21′N 07°09′E
- Country: Switzerland
- Canton: Jura
- District: Porrentruy

Area
  - Total: 2.15 km^{2} (0.83 sq mi)
- Elevation: 692 m (2,270 ft)

Population (2003)
  - Total: 89
  - Density: 41/km^{2} (110/sq mi)
- Time zone: UTC+01:00 (CET)
  - Summer (DST): UTC+02:00 (CEST)
- Postal code: 2884
- SFOS number: 825
- ISO 3166 code: CH-JU
- Surrounded by: Saint-Ursanne, Montmelon, Epauvillers
- Website: SFSO statistics

Montenol is a village and former municipality in the district of Porrentruy in the canton of Jura in Switzerland. Since 2009 it is a part of the new municipality Clos du Doubs.
