= Ocourt =

- Former municipality
- Coat of arms
- Location of Ocourt
- Location within Switzerland Location within Canton of Jura
- Coordinates: 47°21′N 07°05′E
- Country: Switzerland
- Canton: Jura
- District: Porrentruy

Area
  - Total: 11.63 km^{2} (4.49 sq mi)
- Elevation: 424 m (1,391 ft)

Population (2003)
  - Total: 137
  - Density: 11.8/km^{2} (30.5/sq mi)
- Time zone: UTC+01:00 (CET)
  - Summer (DST): UTC+02:00 (CEST)
- Postal code: 2889
- SFOS number: 6798
- ISO 3166 code: CH-JU
- Surrounded by: Epiquerez, Seleute, Saint-Ursanne, Montmelon, Courgenay, Fontenais, Bressaucourt, Montancy(F), Brémoncourt(F)
- Website: SFSO statistics

Ocourt is a village and former municipality in the district of Porrentruy of the canton of Jura in Switzerland. Since 2009 it is a part of the new municipality Clos du Doubs.
