= Courgenay =

- Municipality
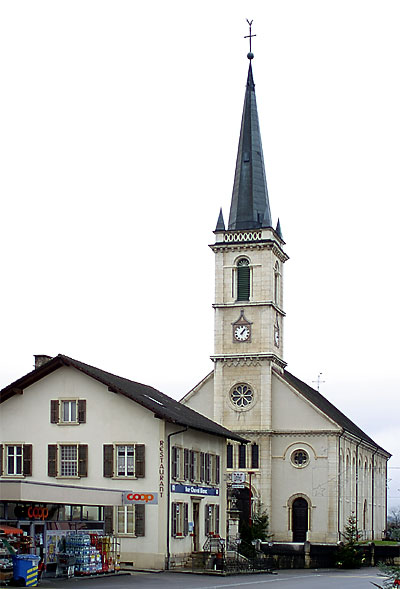
- Courgenay village church

- Flag Coat of arms
- Location of Courgenay
- Location within Switzerland Location within Canton of Jura
- Coordinates: 47°24′N 07°08′E
- Country: Switzerland
- Canton: Jura
- District: Porrentruy

Government
  - Executive: Conseil communal with 8 (Note: The Secretary of the Council is counted as part of the Conseil Communal.) members
  - Mayor: Maire; Didier Jolissaint (as of 2026)

Area
  - Total: 18.42 km^{2} (7.11 sq mi)
- Elevation: 488 m (1,601 ft)

Population (2003)
  - Total: 2,118
  - Density: 115.0/km^{2} (297.8/sq mi)
- Time zone: UTC+01:00 (CET)
  - Summer (DST): UTC+02:00 (CEST)
- Postal code: 2950
- SFOS number: 6784
- ISO 3166 code: CH-JU
- Surrounded by: Porrentruy, Alle, Cornol, Montmelon, Seleute, Ocourt, Fontenais
- Website: www.courgenay.ch

Courgenay (French pronunciation: [kuʁʒənɛ]; Frainc-Comtou: Cordgenaie) is a municipality in the district of Porrentruy in the canton of Jura in Switzerland.

== History ==
Courgenay is first mentioned in 1139 as Corgennart.

== Geography ==
Aerial view (1950)

Courgenay has an area of 18.44 km^{2} (7.12 sq mi). Of this area, 8.91 km^{2} (3.44 mi^{2}) or 48.3% is used for agricultural purposes, while 7.76 km^{2} (3.00 mi^{2}) or 42.1% is forested. Of the rest of the land, 1.72 km^{2} (0.66 mi^{2}) or 9.3% is settled (buildings or roads), 0.02 km^{2} (4.9 acres) or 0.1% is either rivers or lakes and 0.01 km^{2} (2.5 acres) or 0.1% is unproductive land.

Of the built up area, industrial buildings made up 1.1% of the total area while housing and buildings made up 4.1% and transportation infrastructure made up 2.9%. Out of the forested land, 40.8% of the total land area is heavily forested and 1.3% is covered with orchards or small clusters of trees. Of the agricultural land, 25.0% is used for growing crops and 16.4% is pastures, while 1.8% is used for orchards or vine crops and 5.1% is used for alpine pastures. All the water in the municipality is flowing water.

The municipality is located in the Porrentruy district. It consists of the village of Courgenay and the hamlet of Courtemautruy. The former villages of Courtemblin and Courtari were both abandoned shortly before or during the Thirty Years War.

== Coat of arms ==
The blazon of the municipal coat of arms is Argent, a Goose Gules beaked and membered Or statant on Coupeaux Vert and in chief three Mullets of Five of the second.

== Demographics ==
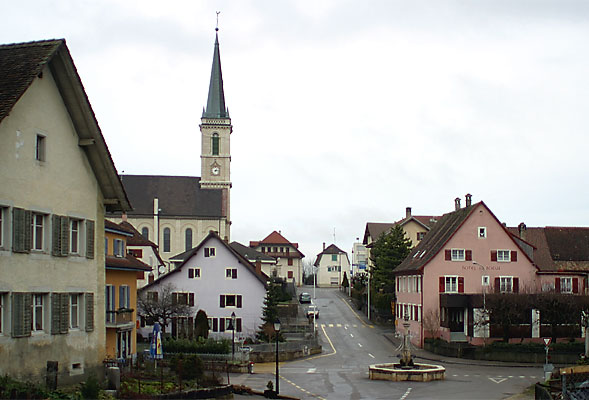
Cougenay village center

Courgenay has a population (as of December 2020) of 2,400. As of 2008, 9.4% of the population are resident foreign nationals. Over the last 10 years (2000–2010) the population has changed at a rate of 2%. Migration accounted for 4%, while births and deaths accounted for -1.6%.

Most of the population (as of 2000) speaks French (1,912 or 92.7%) as their first language, German is the second most common (77 or 3.7%) and Italian is the third (27 or 1.3%). There are 2 people who speak Romansh.

As of 2008, the population was 49.8% male and 50.2% female. The population was made up of 958 Swiss men (44.8% of the population) and 107 (5.0%) non-Swiss men. There were 973 Swiss women (45.5%) and 102 (4.8%) non-Swiss women. Of the population in the municipality, 764 or about 37.1% were born in Courgenay and lived there in 2000. There were 713 or 34.6% who were born in the same canton, while 224 or 10.9% were born somewhere else in Switzerland, and 290 or 14.1% were born outside of Switzerland.

As of 2000, children and teenagers (0–19 years old) make up 24.2% of the population, while adults (20–64 years old) make up 57.1% and seniors (over 64 years old) make up 18.6%.

As of 2000, there were 763 people who were single and never married in the municipality. There were 1,045 married individuals, 155 widows or widowers and 99 individuals who are divorced.

As of 2000, there were 836 private households in the municipality, and an average of 2.4 persons per household. There were 244 households that consist of only one person and 62 households with five or more people. In 2000, a total of 809 apartments (85.5% of the total) were permanently occupied, while 58 apartments (6.1%) were seasonally occupied and 79 apartments (8.4%) were empty. As of 2009, the construction rate of new housing units was 2.3 new units per 1000 residents. The vacancy rate for the municipality, in 2010, was 3.06%.

The historical population is given in the following chart:

== Heritage sites of national significance ==
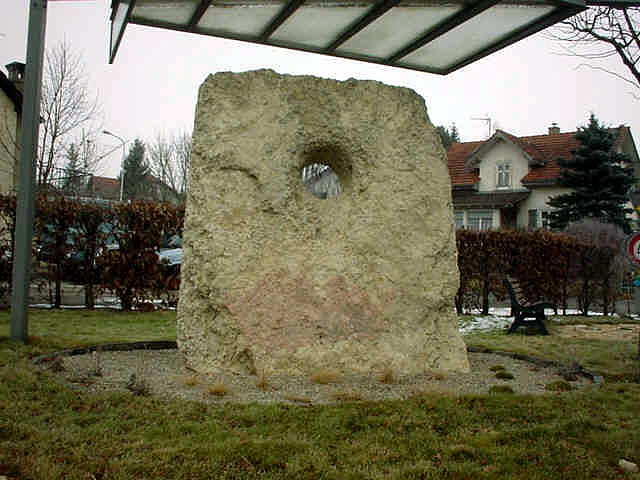
Pierre-Percée

The Neolithic dolmen at Pierre-Percée is listed as a Swiss heritage site of national significance.

== Politics ==
In the 2007 federal election the most popular party was the SPS which received 30.26% of the vote. The next three most popular parties were the CVP (26.42%), the FDP (23.69%) and the SVP (14.98%). In the federal election, a total of 695 votes were cast, and the voter turnout was 44.1%.

== Economy ==
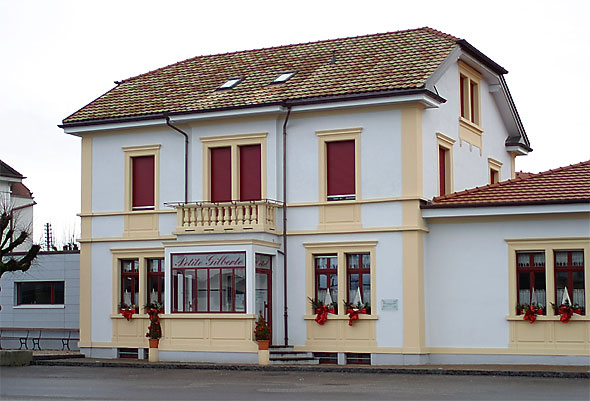
Hôtel de la Gare (Train station hotel) in Courgenay

As of 2010, Courgenay had an unemployment rate of 6.6%. As of 2008, there were 83 people employed in the primary economic sector and about 31 businesses involved in this sector. 465 people were employed in the secondary sector and there were 37 businesses in this sector. 285 people were employed in the tertiary sector, with 61 businesses in this sector. There were 981 residents of the municipality who were employed in some capacity, of which females made up 40.5% of the workforce.

In 2008 the total number of full-time equivalent jobs was 733. The number of jobs in the primary sector was 58, all of which were in agriculture. The number of jobs in the secondary sector was 439 of which 360 or (82.0%) were in manufacturing and 79 (18.0%) were in construction. The number of jobs in the tertiary sector was 236. In the tertiary sector; 55 or 23.3% were in wholesale or retail sales or the repair of motor vehicles, 52 or 22.0% were in the movement and storage of goods, 22 or 9.3% were in a hotel or restaurant, 1 was in the information industry, 11 or 4.7% were the insurance or financial industry, 18 or 7.6% were technical professionals or scientists, 19 or 8.1% were in education and 45 or 19.1% were in health care.

In 2000, there were 530 workers who commuted into the municipality and 620 workers who commuted away. The municipality is a net exporter of workers, with about 1.2 workers leaving the municipality for every one entering. About 25.7% of the workforce coming into Courgenay are coming from outside Switzerland. Of the working population, 10.7% used public transportation to get to work, and 65% used a private car.

== Religion ==
From the 2000 census, 1,487 or 72.1% were Roman Catholic, while 319 or 15.5% belonged to the Swiss Reformed Church. Of the rest of the population, there were 4 members of an Orthodox church (or about 0.19% of the population), and there were 62 individuals (or about 3.01% of the population) who belonged to another Christian church. There were 38 (or about 1.84% of the population) who were Islamic. There were 7 individuals who were Buddhist. 96 (or about 4.66% of the population) belonged to no church, are agnostic or atheist, and 80 individuals (or about 3.88% of the population) did not answer the question.

== Transport ==
Courgenay sits on the Delémont–Delle line and is served by trains at Courgenay railway station.

== Education ==
In Courgenay about 669 or (32.4%) of the population have completed non-mandatory upper secondary education, and 162 or (7.9%) have completed additional higher education (either university or a Fachhochschule). Of the 162 who completed tertiary schooling, 60.5% were Swiss men, 24.1% were Swiss women, 11.7% were non-Swiss men and 3.7% were non-Swiss women.

The Canton of Jura school system provides two year of non-obligatory Kindergarten, followed by six years of Primary school. This is followed by three years of obligatory lower Secondary school where the students are separated according to ability and aptitude. Following the lower Secondary students may attend a three or four year optional upper Secondary school followed by some form of Tertiary school or they may enter an apprenticeship.

During the 2009-10 school year, there were a total of 198 students attending 11 classes in Courgenay. There were 2.5 kindergarten classes with a total of 49 students in the municipality. The municipality had 8 primary classes and 149 students. There are only nine Secondary schools in the canton, so all the students from Courgenay attend their secondary school in another municipality.

As of 2000, there were 8 students in Courgenay who came from another municipality, while 156 residents attended schools outside the municipality.

== Notable people ==
- Gilberte Montavon (1896–1957), for whom the movie Gilberte de Courgenay is based
