= Ognon =

Ognon may refer to:

Rivers in France

- Ognon (Franche-Comté) in Franche-Comté, tributary of the Saône
- Ognon (Loire-Atlantique) in Loire-Atlantique
- Ognon, which becomes the Ornain after its confluence with the Maldite

Others

- Ognon, Oise, commune in France
- "Oignon" and (since the 1990 orthographic reform) "ognon" are the French language words for onion.
