= Ursicinus of Saint-Ursanne =

Irish missionary and Swiss hermit

Saint Ursicinus of Saint-Ursanne
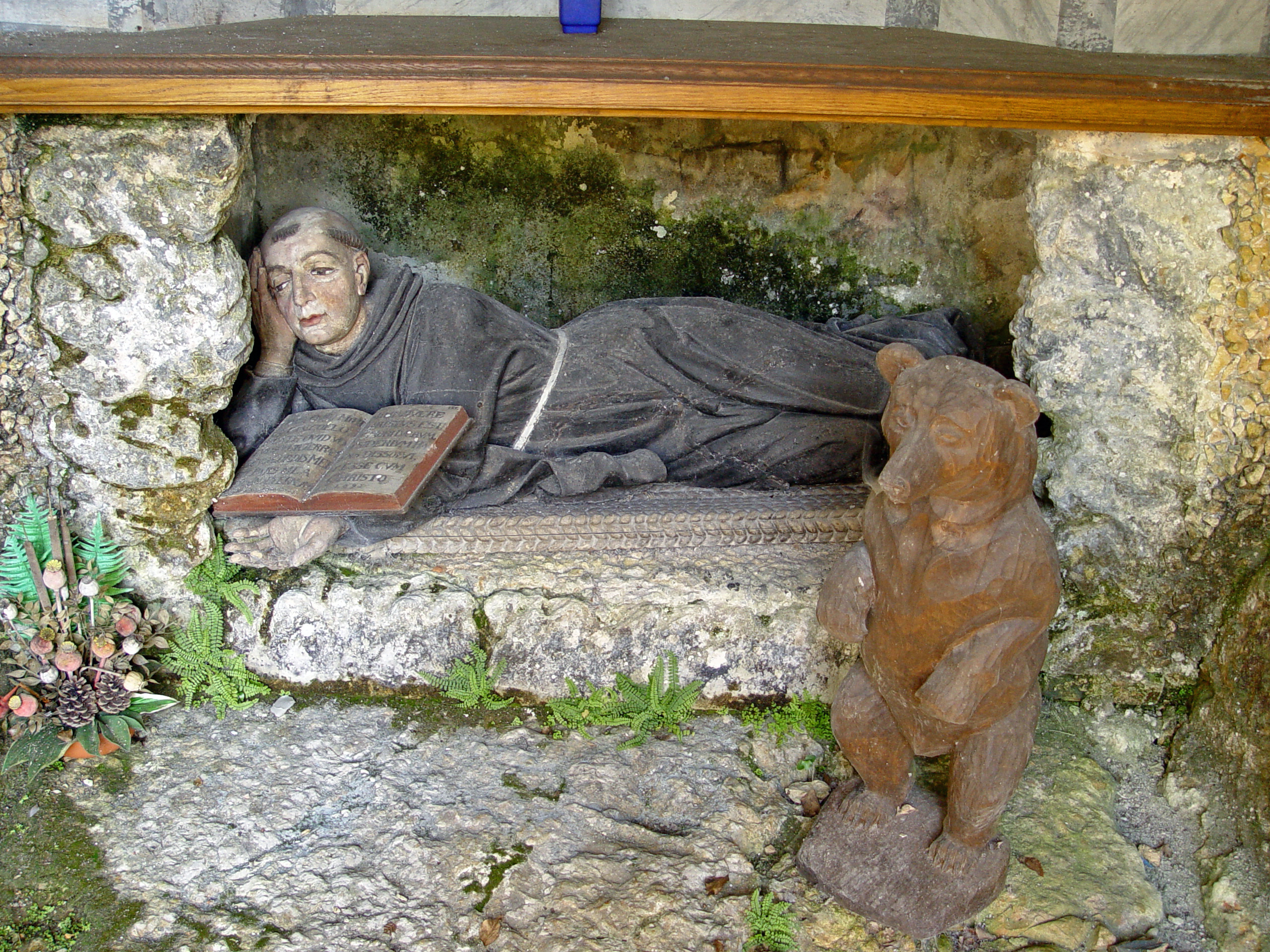
- Statue of St. Ursicinus, Hermitage St-Ursanne
- Died: c. 620 AD
- Venerated in: Roman Catholic Church; Eastern Orthodox Church
- Major shrine: Saint-Ursanne; venerated at Basel, Besançon, and Mainz
- Feast: 20 December
- Attributes: abbot with three lilies in his hand or holding a book and fleur-de-lys, surrounded by fleur-de-lys
- Patronage: invoked against stiff neck

Ursicinus (also Hursannus, Ursitz, Oschanne, fl. 620) was an Irish missionary and hermit in the Jura region.

== Information ==
A vita of his is preserved in a redaction of the 11th century. According to this account, he was a disciple of Columbanus at Luxeuil who followed his master when he was banished from Burgundy in 610, but then retired as a hermit in the Doubs valley. Veneration of Ursicinus is attested since the 7th century. In Grandval, a church was dedicated to Ursicinus in 675. By the 11th century, he was part of the local canon of saints of the Besançon diocese. His feast day is on 20 December. Ursicinus' supposed sarcophagus is preserved in St-Ursanne in what is now the canton of Jura in Switzerland.

== Notes ==
- Andreas Merkt, Ursicinus in Biographisch-Bibliographisches Kirchenlexikon, vol. 12 (1997).
