= Burnevillers =

- Commune
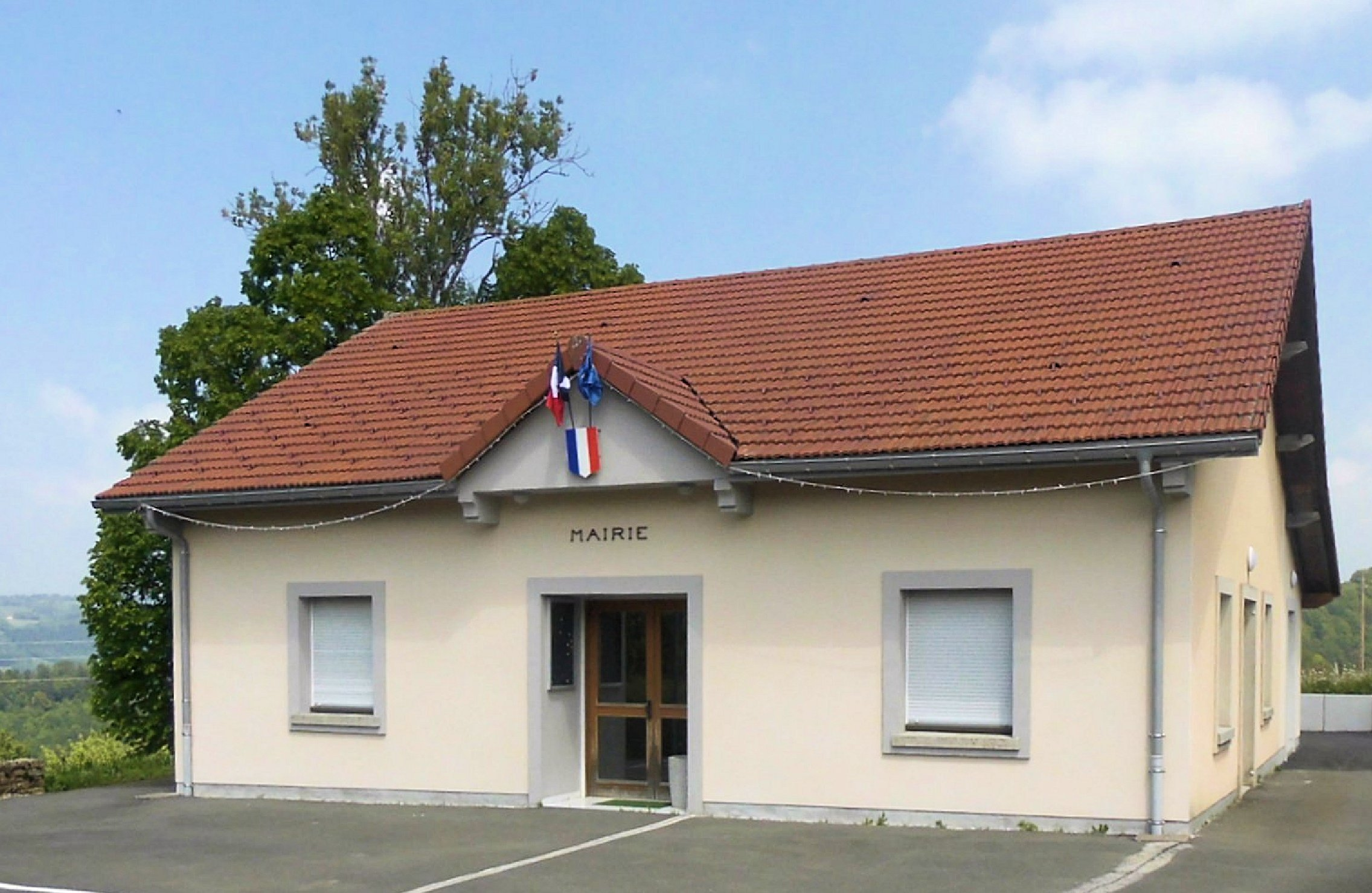
- The town hall in Burnevillers
- Location of Burnevillers
- Location within France Location within Bourgogne-Franche-Comté
- Coordinates: 47°19′47″N 7°00′32″E
- Country: France
- Region: Bourgogne-Franche-Comté
- Department: Doubs
- Arrondissement: Montbéliard
- Canton: Maîche

Government
  - Mayor (2020–2026): Lydie Lab
- Area^{1}: 6.74 km^{2} (2.60 sq mi)
- Highest elevation: 892 m (2,927 ft)
- Lowest elevation: 570 m (1,870 ft)
- Population (2023): 48
  - Density: 7.1/km^{2} (18/sq mi)
- Time zone: UTC+01:00 (CET)
  - Summer (DST): UTC+02:00 (CEST)
- INSEE/Postal code: 25102 /25470
- ^{1} French Land Register data, which excludes lakes, ponds, glaciers > 1 km^{2} (0.386 sq mi or 247 acres) and river estuaries.

Burnevillers is a commune in the Doubs department in the Bourgogne-Franche-Comté region in eastern France.

== Population ==
Historical population
Year	Pop.	±% p.a.
1968	42	—
1975	39	−1.05%
1982	37	−0.75%
1990	51	+4.09%
1999	42	−2.13%
2007	49	+1.95%
2012	44	−2.13%
2017	45	+0.45%
2023	48	+1.08%
Source: INSEE

== See also ==
- Communes of the Doubs department
