= Saint-Brais =

- Municipality
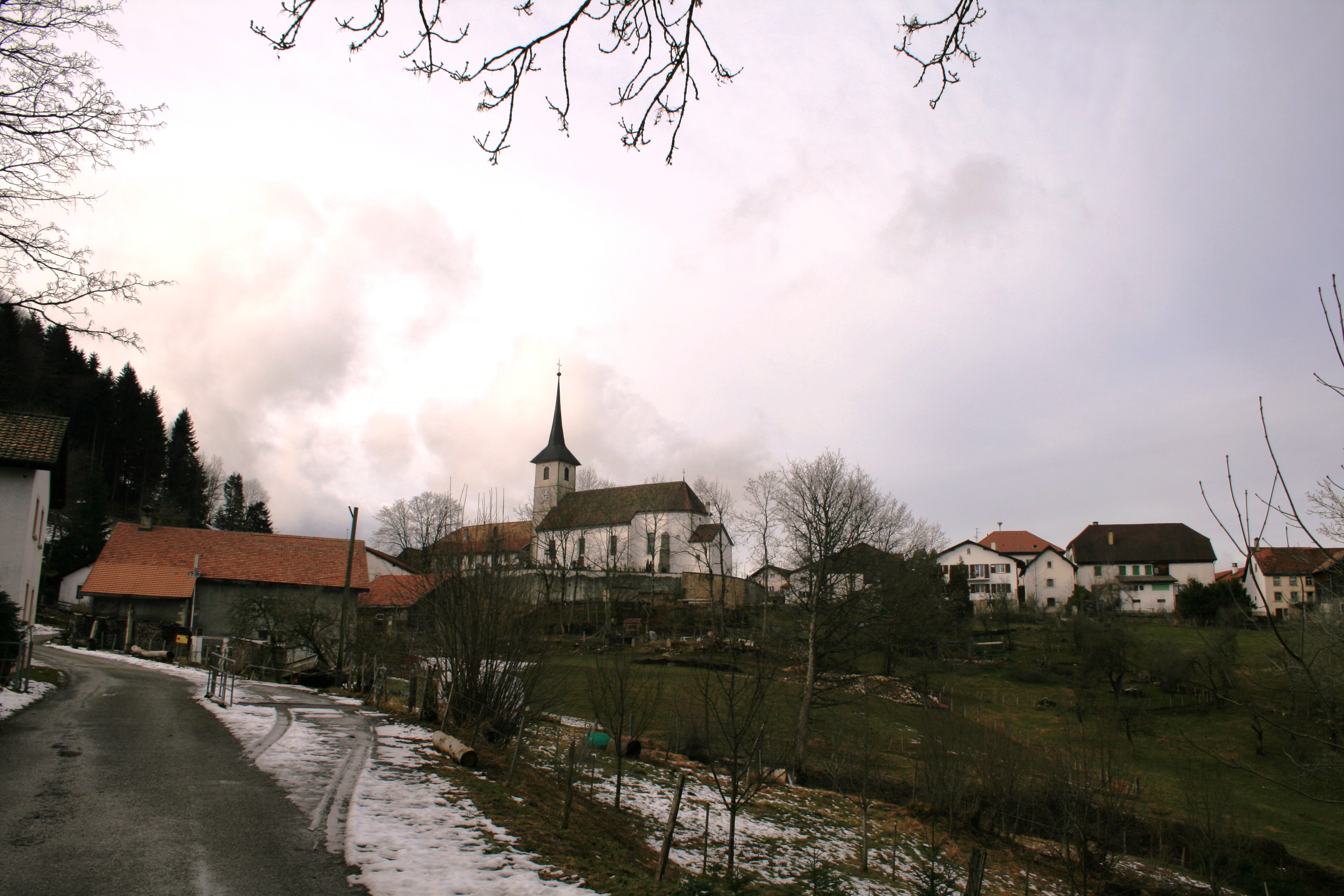
- Saint-Brais village

- Coat of arms
- Location of Saint-Brais
- Location within Switzerland Location within Canton of Jura
- Coordinates: 47°18′N 07°07′E
- Country: Switzerland
- Canton: Jura
- District: Franches-Montagnes

Government
  - Executive: Conseil communal with 5 members
  - Mayor: Maire; Aline Erard-Donzé (as of 2026)

Area
  - Total: 15.19 km^{2} (5.86 sq mi)
- Elevation: 967 m (3,173 ft)

Population (2020)
  - Total: 227
  - Density: 14.9/km^{2} (38.7/sq mi)
- Time zone: UTC+01:00 (CET)
  - Summer (DST): UTC+02:00 (CEST)
- Postal code: 2364
- SFOS number: 6758
- ISO 3166 code: CH-JU
- Surrounded by: Lajoux, Montfaucon, Clos du Doubs, Glovelier, Saulcy
- Website: https://saint-brais.ch/

Saint-Brais (Frainc-Comtou: Sïnt-Brais) is a municipality in the district of Franches-Montagnes in the canton of Jura in Switzerland.

== History ==
Aerial view (1955)

Saint-Brais is first mentioned in 1275 as Sem Bris. The municipality was formerly known by its German name St Brix, however, that name is no longer used.

== Geography ==
Saint-Brais has an area of 15.16 km^{2} (5.85 sq mi). Of this area, 7.54 km^{2} (2.91 mi^{2}) or 49.8% is used for agricultural purposes, while 6.82 km^{2} (2.63 mi^{2}) or 45.0% is forested. Of the rest of the land, 0.55 km^{2} (0.21 mi^{2}) or 3.6% is settled (buildings or roads), 0.17 km^{2} (0.066 mi^{2}) or 1.1% is either rivers or lakes and 0.05 km^{2} (12 acres) or 0.3% is unproductive land.

Of the built up area, housing and buildings made up 1.4% and transportation infrastructure made up 2.1%. Out of the forested land, 41.5% of the total land area is heavily forested and 3.6% is covered with orchards or small clusters of trees. Of the agricultural land, 3.7% is used for growing crops and 35.0% is pastures and 10.9% is used for alpine pastures. All the water in the municipality is flowing water.

The municipality is located in the Franches-Montagnes district, from the high valleys of the Franches-Montagnes down to the banks of the Doubs river. It consists of the village of Saint-Brais and scattered hamlets and individual farm houses.

The municipalities of Le Bémont, Les Bois, Les Breuleux, La Chaux-des-Breuleux, Les Enfers, Les Genevez, Lajoux, Montfaucon, Muriaux, Le Noirmont, Saignelégier, Saint-Brais and Soubey are considering a merger on at a date in the future into the new municipality of Franches-Montagnes.

== Coat of arms ==
The blazon of the municipal coat of arms is Azure, St. Brice depicted as bishop clad Argent with mitre and haloed Or holding a crosier statant on Coupeaux of the last. The village's name comes from St. Brice who was the bishop of Tours during the 5th century.

== Demographics ==
Saint-Brais has a population (as of December 2020) of 227. As of 2008, 4.5% of the population are resident foreign nationals. Over the last 10 years (2000–2010) the population has changed at a rate of 1.8%. Migration accounted for 4.6%, while births and deaths accounted for -1.4%.

Most of the population (as of 2000) speaks French (188 or 88.7%) as their first language, German is the second most common (18 or 8.5%) and Dutch is the third (4 or 1.9%). There is 1 person who speaks Italian.

As of 2008, the population was 49.5% male and 50.5% female. The population was made up of 105 Swiss men (47.3% of the population) and 5 (2.3%) non-Swiss men. There were 108 Swiss women (48.6%) and 4 (1.8%) non-Swiss women. Of the population in the municipality, 110 or about 51.9% were born in Saint-Brais and lived there in 2000. There were 56 or 26.4% who were born in the same canton, while 22 or 10.4% were born somewhere else in Switzerland, and 13 or 6.1% were born outside of Switzerland.

As of 2000, children and teenagers (0–19 years old) make up 28.8% of the population, while adults (20–64 years old) make up 56.1% and seniors (over 64 years old) make up 15.1%.

As of 2000, there were 102 people who were single and never married in the municipality. There were 87 married individuals, 18 widows or widowers and 5 individuals who are divorced.

As of 2000, there were 80 private households in the municipality, and an average of 2.6 persons per household. There were 24 households that consist of only one person and 11 households with five or more people. In 2000, a total of 78 apartments (70.3% of the total) were permanently occupied, while 27 apartments (24.3%) were seasonally occupied and 6 apartments (5.4%) were empty. The vacancy rate for the municipality, in 2010, was 1.74%.

The historical population is given in the following chart:

== Heritage sites of national significance ==
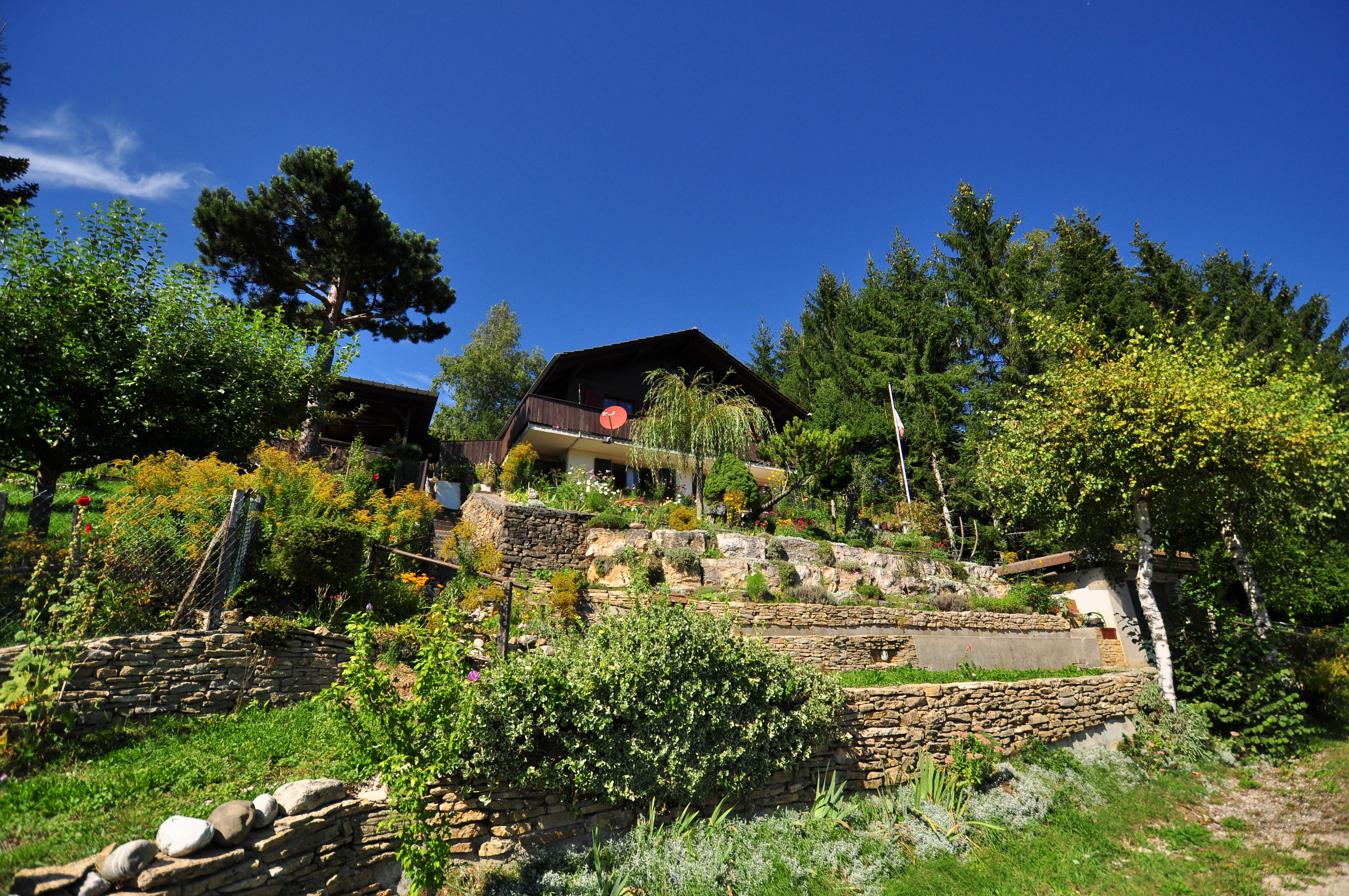
Le Mont

The prehistoric settlement of Le Mont, which is shared sith Glovelier, is listed as a Swiss heritage site of national significance.

== Politics ==
In the 2007 federal election the most popular party was the CVP which received 34% of the vote. The next three most popular parties were the SPS (27.33%), the CSP (26%) and the SVP (10%). In the federal election, a total of 77 votes were cast, and the voter turnout was 41.6%.

== Economy ==
As of 2010, Saint-Brais had an unemployment rate of 3.1%. As of 2008, there were 56 people employed in the primary economic sector and about 22 businesses involved in this sector. No one was employed in the secondary sector. 25 people were employed in the tertiary sector, with 9 businesses in this sector. There were 98 residents of the municipality who were employed in some capacity, of which females made up 34.7% of the workforce.

In 2008 the total number of full-time equivalent jobs was 62. The number of jobs in the primary sector was 44, all of which were in agriculture. There were no jobs in the secondary sector. The number of jobs in the tertiary sector was 18. In the tertiary sector; 5 or 27.8% were in wholesale or retail sales or the repair of motor vehicles, 2 or 11.1% were in the movement and storage of goods, 8 or 44.4% were in a hotel or restaurant, 1 was in education.

In 2000, there were 4 workers who commuted into the municipality and 33 workers who commuted away. The municipality is a net exporter of workers, with about 8.3 workers leaving the municipality for every one entering. Of the working population, 7.1% used public transportation to get to work, and 30.6% used a private car.

== Transport ==
The municipality has a railway station, Bollement, on the La Chaux-de-Fonds–Glovelier line.

== Religion ==
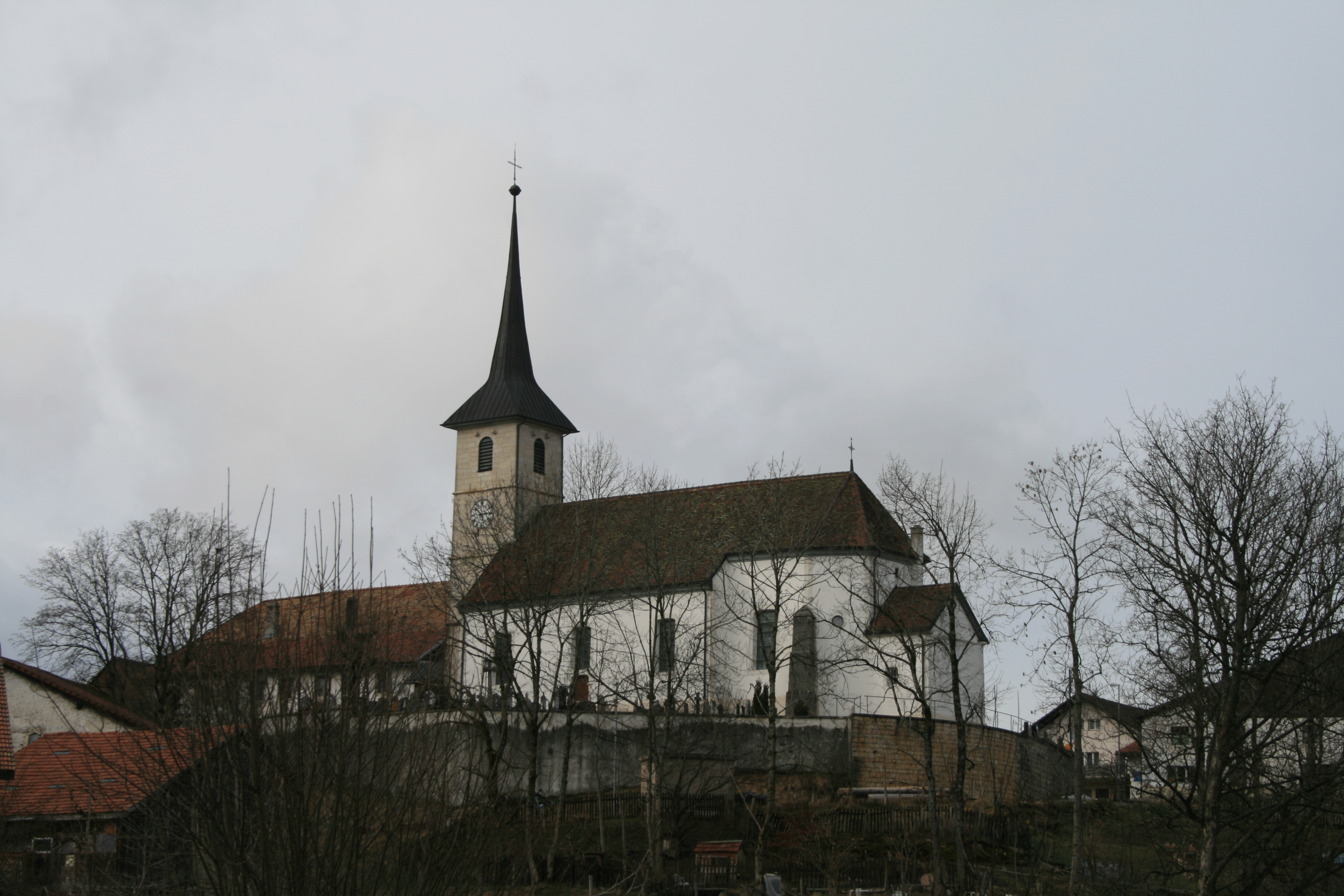
Saint-Brais church

From the 2000 census, 157 or 74.1% were Roman Catholic, while 12 or 5.7% belonged to the Swiss Reformed Church. Of the rest of the population, there were 12 individuals (or about 5.66% of the population) who belonged to another Christian church. 24 (or about 11.32% of the population) belonged to no church, are agnostic or atheist, and 13 individuals (or about 6.13% of the population) did not answer the question.

== Education ==
In Saint-Brais about 63 or (29.7%) of the population have completed non-mandatory upper secondary education, and 10 or (4.7%) have completed additional higher education (either university or a Fachhochschule). Of the 10 who completed tertiary schooling, 50.0% were Swiss men, 40.0% were Swiss women.

The Canton of Jura school system provides two year of non-obligatory Kindergarten, followed by six years of Primary school. This is followed by three years of obligatory lower Secondary school where the students are separated according to ability and aptitude. Following the lower Secondary students may attend a three or four year optional upper Secondary school followed by some form of Tertiary school or they may enter an apprenticeship.

During the 2009–10 school year, there were a total of 16 students attending one class at the Montfaucon-Saint-Brais school. There was one kindergarten class with a total of 16 students in the municipality. The municipality had no primary school classes, all the students attended school in a neighboring school. There are only nine Secondary schools in the canton, so all the students from Saint-Brais attend their secondary school in another municipality.

As of 2000, there were 3 students in Saint-Brais who came from another municipality, while 21 residents attended schools outside the municipality.
