= Frainc-Comtou =

Romance language of France and Switzerland

- Native to: France, Switzerland
- Region: Franche-Comté, Canton of Jura, Bernese Jura
- Native speakers: (undated figure of c. 4,000)
- Language family: Indo-European: Italic; Latino-Faliscan; Latinic; Romance; Italo-Western; Western; Gallo-Iberian; Gallo-Romance; Gallo-Rhaetian?; Arpitan–Oïl; Oïl; Burgundian zone; Frainc-Comtou
- Early forms: Old Latin: Vulgar Latin; Proto-Romance; Old Gallo-Romance; Old French

Language codes
- ISO 639-3: –
- Glottolog: fran1270
- Linguasphere: & 51-AAA-hc 51-AAA-ja & 51-AAA-hc
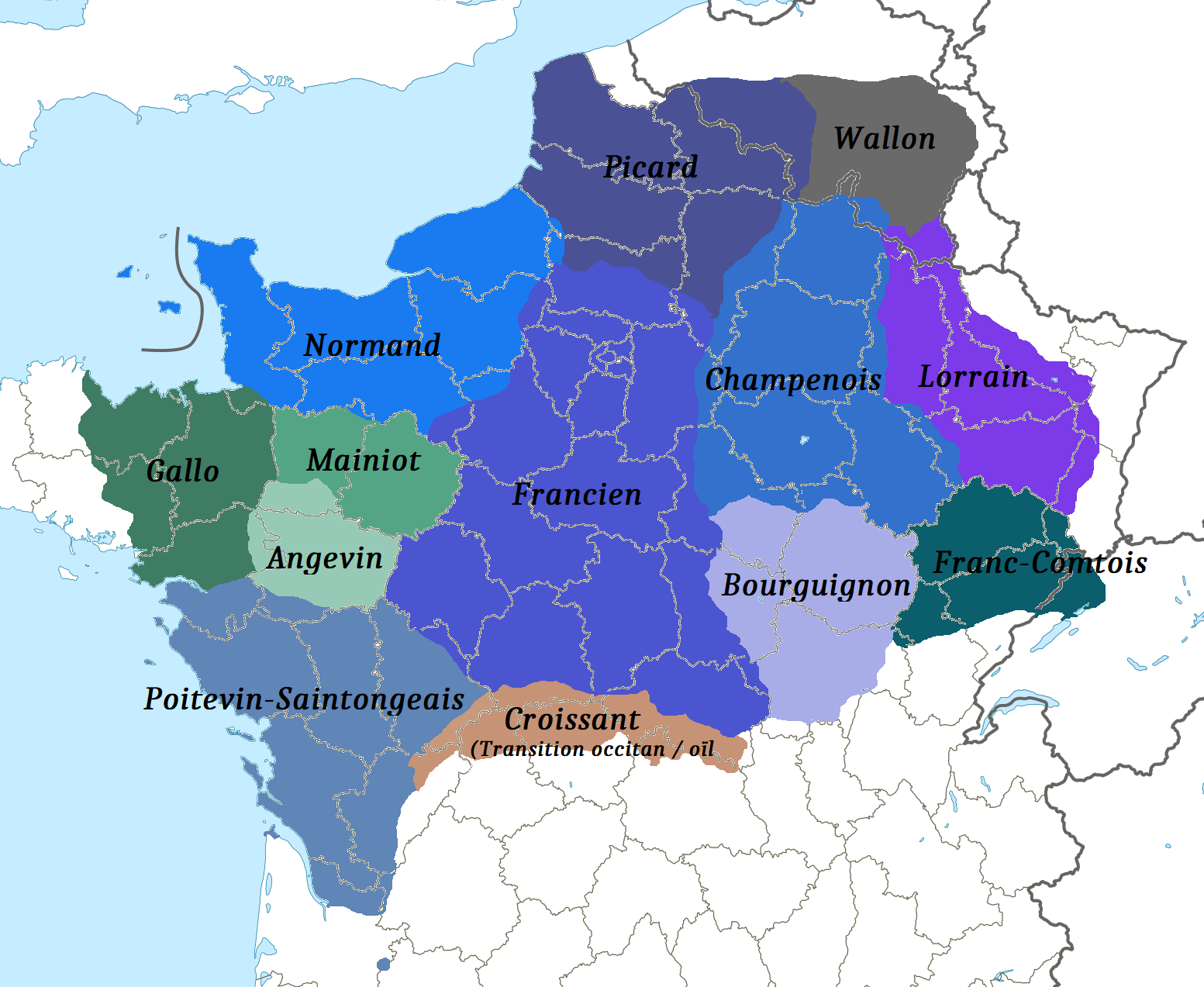
- Situation of Frainc-Comtou among the Oïl languages.

Frainc-Comtou (French: franc-comtois) is a Romance language of the langues d'oïl language family spoken in the Franche-Comté region of France and in the Canton of Jura and Bernese Jura in Switzerland.

== History ==
Jean Priorat's Li abrejance de l'ordre de chevalerie is written in Old French with Frainc-Comtou features.

Although Franc-Comtois remained primarily a spoken language for centuries, written texts in the language are known from the 17th century, and some date back to the 16th century. The oldest known text in Franc-Comtois is the Chant du Rosemont, a ballad dating from 1525. It commemorates Généry, also called Jean Neury, and Richard Prévôt, the leader of a group of peasants who took part in the German Peasants' War that affected the German-speaking world that year. Another early example is the Dialogue de Porte Noire et de Pilory sur la prise de Besançon par les Français, dating from 1668, which concerns the capture of Besançon by French forces.

Contrary to the common image of Franc-Comtois as an exclusively oral language, it was therefore also written. Nevertheless, French imposed itself early among the elites in Franche-Comté, while Franc-Comtois remained for many centuries the principal language of the common people.

The 19th and 20th centuries were marked by a major decline of the language, both in Franche-Comté and in the canton of Jura. This decline was due in particular to school policies that promoted French over the other languages spoken in France. In written texts, Franc-Comtois was often influenced lexically by French.

By the late 20th and early 21st centuries, the language had largely disappeared from public life. It survived mainly among small groups of speakers, often active in associations, for some of whom it remained a mother tongue.

In 2021, Antoine de Saint-Exupéry's novel The Little Prince was translated into Franc-Comtois by the Comtois writer Billy Fumey under the title Lou péquignot prïnce. The edition was printed and sold in 600 copies, making it one of the best-selling books in the Franc-Comtois language. In 2024, another Franc-Comtois translation was published by the Swiss writer Michel Choffat under the title Lo Ptét Prïnce.

Today, the number of people who understand or speak Franc-Comtois is estimated at up to 5,000, including about 4,000 in Switzerland and 1,000 in Franche-Comté.

== Geographic range ==
The Franc-Comtois language area is bounded:

- to the south and south-east by Franco-Provençal varieties;
- to the west by Bourguignon-Morvandiau and Champenois varieties;
- to the north by Lorrain varieties;
- to the east and north-east by Alemannic Germanic languages, including Alsatian and Swiss German, or by other varieties of High German.

=== In France ===
Like all regional and minority languages of France, Franc-Comtois has no institutional status in France. The association Union des Patoisants en Langue Romane organises courses for teaching Franc-Comtois.

Several groups and associations work on a small scale to make the language better known, especially through contributions to reviews and through the organisation of courses.

==== In Alsace ====
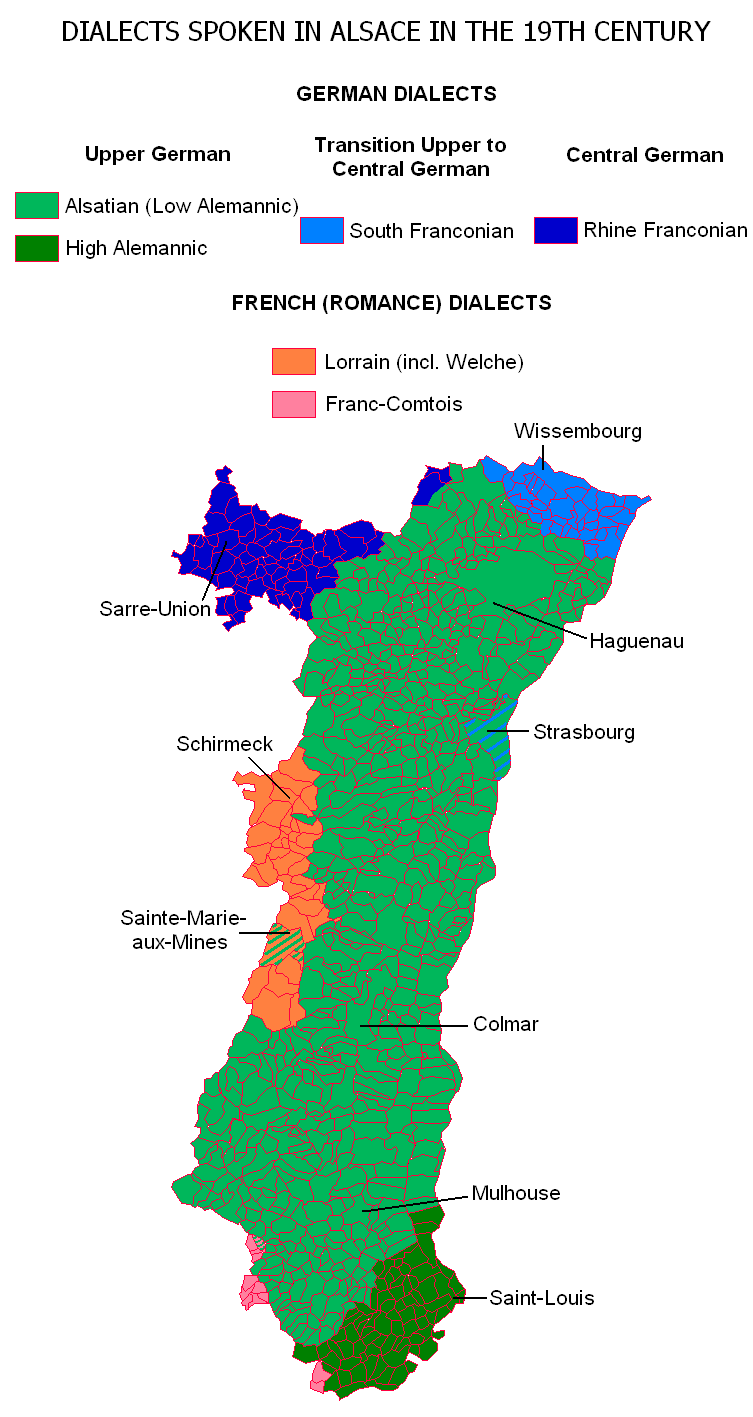
Linguistic map of Alsace in 1910. Franc-Comtois appears in pink.

According to a linguistic map of Alsace in 1910, the language area extended in the arrondissement of Altkirch over ten communes of the canton of Dannemarie, Bellemagny, Bretten, Chavannes-sur-l'Étang, Eteimbes, Magny, Montreux-Jeune, Montreux-Vieux, Romagny, Saint-Cosme and Valdieu-Lutran, and over two communes of the canton of Ferrette, Courtavon and Levoncourt.

Today, Franc-Comtois speakers are still active in Alsace.

The General Council of Haut-Rhin adopted a policy in favor of bilingualism by signing a four-party agreement for 2007–2013. One of its aims was to make the Écomusée d'Alsace an experimental example of a bilingual model, with signage representing all the dialects of Alsace. The agreement referred to names in French, in Hochdeutsch, and, depending on the area, in Elsasserditsch or Alsatian, in Roman for the Montreux-Jeune, Montreux-Vieux and Valdieu-Lutran area, in Welche for the Lapoutroie and Le Bonhomme area, or in Alsatian Yiddish.

This initiative represented an early recognition of a Franc-Comtois dialect, called Roman in Alsace, and could potentially be extended at departmental level.

==== In Franche-Comté ====
In Franche-Comté, the Franc-Comtois language area extends over Doubs in its northern part, Haute-Saône, the northern part of Jura, and the Territoire de Belfort.

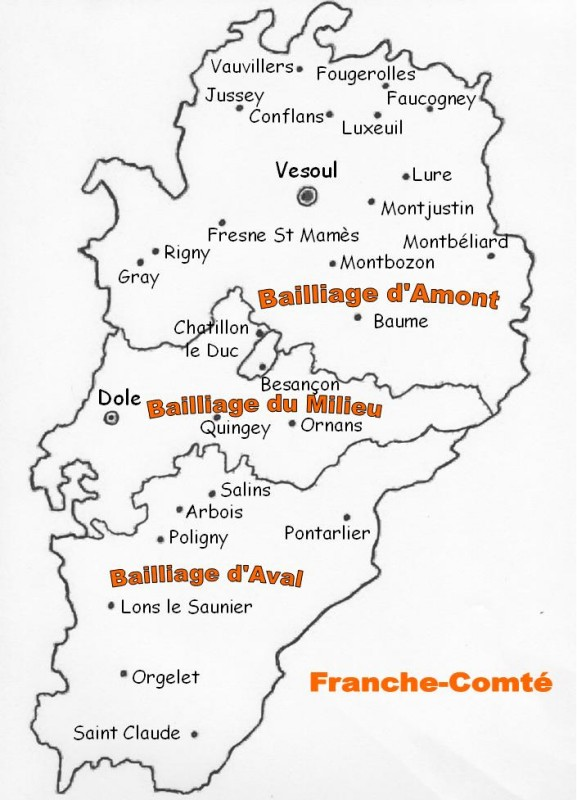
The bailiwicks of Franche-Comté before 1790.

The boundary between Franco-Provençal and Franc-Comtois corresponds approximately to the historical frontier between the Bailliage du Milieu and the Bailliage d'Aval, in the territorial organisation that existed before 1790.

Franc-Comtois remains little known even among people from Franche-Comté themselves. It is relatively uncommon in local toponymy. Only one village in Haute-Saône, Anjeux, has a motto in Comtois: Ai Anjeux lo diale y cueut, meaning “At Anjeux the devil cooks”. The motto alludes to the 17th-century witchcraft trials in which many alleged witches were burned.

Although regional French expressions remain widely used in Franche-Comté, the region seems largely to have forgotten its own language. Nevertheless, an increasing number of groups have emerged to defend local dialects.

=== In Switzerland ===
On 7 December 2018, the Federal Council approved Switzerland's seventh report on the implementation of the European Charter for Regional or Minority Languages. Following a recommendation by the Council of Europe to recognise Franco-Provençal, to which most dialects of Romandy historically belong, as a regional or minority language, the Federal Council extended this recognition to Franc-Comtois. Both Franco-Provençal and Franc-Comtois are now officially recognised in Switzerland as minority languages.

==== In the canton of Bern ====
Franc-Comtois is the traditional language of the north-east of the Bernese Jura, the French-speaking region of the canton of Bern, more specifically the northern part of the former Moutier District. In the south-eastern part of the region, Franco-Provençal is the traditional idiom, while in the central part there is a transitional dialect between Franc-Comtois and Franco-Provençal.

==== In the canton of Jura ====
The language has relatively significant activity in the canton of Jura, especially through the existence of several associations that protect and keep Franc-Comtois alive. Nevertheless, the language was neglected for almost two centuries. It developed differently from the other dialects of Romandy because of the historical polarisation between the Germanic language imposed by Bern and French, becoming a symbol of resistance.

According to Andres Kristol, at the end of the 20th century 3.1% of the population of the canton still spoke Franc-Comtois. According to Radio Télévision Suisse, in 2018, when the language was officially recognised, up to 4,000 people were Franc-Comtois speakers, representing about 5.5% of the canton's population.

Article 42.2 of the Constitution of the Republic and Canton of Jura refers to the language under the term “patois”:

They shall ensure and contribute to the conservation, enrichment and enhancement of Jura heritage, especially patois.

On 26 April 1997, Jean-Marie Moine proposed considering the creation of a study circle for Comtois within the Société jurassienne d'émulation (SJE). Moine has been responsible for the circle since its creation. The circle was not founded until 28 April 2001. Named Voiyïn, meaning “regrowth” in French, it meets regularly four times a year.

Its activities include:

- recording Franc-Comtois speakers;
- establishing a catalogue of everything written or published in Comtois, including articles, books, records, cassettes and videocassettes;
- presenting research on the Comtois language and examining new Comtois texts written by members of the circle;
- gathering documents and making them available to the public.

In 1956, Joseph Badet, better known as Djôsèt Barotchèt, founded the Réton di Ciôs-di-Doubs, or “Echo of Clos-du-Doubs”, an association of Franc-Comtois speakers. He was committed to the defence and preservation of Comtois and wrote nineteen plays, as well as many poems and songs set to music by Paul Montavon and Ernest Beuchat. He also gave Comtois courses, took part in radio programmes and wrote many newspaper articles. In 1983, he received the Jura Literary Prize.

== Dialects ==
The Franc-Comtois language is composed of several dialects:

- Saône, spoken on the high plateaus of the department of Haute-Saône;
- Doubs-Ognon, spoken in the valley of the Ognon, including the valleys of the department of Doubs and the southern part of Haute-Saône;
- Lomont-Doubs, spoken in the Lomont massif, in the upper valleys east of the Doubs and in the western part of the canton of Jura;
- Ajoulot, spoken in Ajoie, the valley of the Savoureuse, the western Sundgau, including the Territoire de Belfort and neighbouring parts of the department of Haut-Rhin, around Porrentruy and in the north-western part of the canton of Jura. Ajoulot is probably the most developed and best-known of all Franc-Comtois dialects, and many authors still write in it;
- Vâdais, spoken at Delémont in the canton of Jura;
- Taignon, spoken in the Franches-Montagnes in the south-western part of the canton of Jura.

In the canton of Jura, six local speech varieties are distinguished by geographical area, four of which may be attached to the Franc-Comtois dialect area: the Franches-Montagnes, the Delémont valley, Ajoie and the former provostry of Moutier-Grandval. This observation makes it possible to add a seventh dialect area in the Bernese Jura.

A Besançon speech variety may also be distinguished, or more specifically a Bousbot variety, named after the inhabitants of the Battant district. It developed in literature from the end of the 17th century with the Noëls, the Crèche and the Jacquemardade. This typical speech of Besançon is characterised by great closeness to French and by a vocabulary much less influenced by Germanic languages.

== Bibliography ==
- Dalby, David (1999/2000). The Linguasphere Register of the World's Languages and Speech Communities. (Vol. 2). Hebron, Wales, UK: Linguasphere Press. ISBN 0-9532919-2-8.

== See also ==
- Languages of France
- Languages of Switzerland
- Linguasphere Observatory (Observatoire Linguistique)
- Franc-Comtois Language at wiktionary
