= Federal Inventory of Amphibian Spawning Areas =

The Federal Inventory of Amphibian Spawning Areas is part of a 2001 Ordinance of the Swiss Federal Council implementing the Federal Law on the Protection of Nature and Cultural Heritage. The inventory includes spawning areas of amphibians of national importance in Switzerland. The inventory includes permanent and temporary sites.

== Permanent sites ==
This table is sorted by canton and municipality of location. Sites located in more than one canton are listed once for each canton.

Ref	Site	Location (municipalities)	Canton	Year	Revised
AG0003	Zurlindeninsel	Aarau	AG	2001	
AG0021	Seematten	Aristau	AG	2001	
AG2002	Butzenmoos	Aristau	AG	2001	
AG2003	Bremengrien	Aristau	AG	2001	
AG0453	Birri-Weiher	Aristau, Merenschwand	AG	2001	
AG0019	Halbmond	Aristau, Rottenschwil	AG	2001	
AG0613	Musital	Baldingen, Rekingen, Tegerfelden	AG	2007	
AG0096	Moos	Boniswil, Seengen	AG	2001	
AG0102	Feldenmoos	Boswil	AG	2001	
AG0104	Niedermoos	Boswil	AG	2001	
AG0120	Fischergrien	Böttstein	AG	2001	
AG0128	Hegnau	Bremgarten	AG	2001	
AG0129	Schwand	Bremgarten	AG	2001	
AG2005	Folenweid	Bremgarten	AG	2001	
AG0201	Dickhölzli	Bremgarten, Fischbach-Göslikon	AG	2001	
AG0203	Fischbacher Moos	Bremgarten, Fischbach-Göslikon	AG	2001	
AG0139	Haldengutweiher	Brittnau	AG	2001	
AG0843	Umiker Schachen	Brugg, Villnachern	AG	2001	
AG0149	Auschachen	Brugg, Windisch	AG	2001	
AG0159	Lostorf	Buchs, Suhr	AG	2001	
AG2419	Forenmoos	Bünzen, Hermetschwil-Staffeln	AG	2001	
AG0163	Burger Weiher	Burg	AG	2001	
AG0439	Burgergrube	Burg, Menziken	AG	2001	
AG2795	Feret	Densbüren	AG	2007	
AG3035	Ebni	Dintikon	AG	2001	
AG0176	Kiesgrube Egg	Dürrenäsch	AG	2001	
AG3432	Foort	Eggenwil	AG	2007	
AG0367	Alte Reuss	Eggenwil, Künten	AG	2001	
AG0181	Mattenplätz	Eiken	AG	2001	
AG0183	Weiher im Tal	Eiken	AG	2001	
AG0304	Ankematt	Eiken, Kaisten	AG	2001	
AG0206	Tote Reuss	Fischbach-Göslikon	AG	2001	
AG0208	Letzi	Fischbach-Göslikon	AG	2001	
AG0202	Zelgli/Höll	Fischbach-Göslikon, Niederwil	AG	2001	
AG0233	Mättenfeld	Gontenschwil, Oberkulm, Zetzwil	AG	2001	
AG0254	Wolfshüsli	Hägglingen, Wohlen	AG	2001	
AG0260	Binsenweiher	Hausen bei Brugg	AG	2001	
AG0268	Steinrüti	Hermetschwil-Staffeln, Rottenschwil	AG	2001	
AG0815	Rottenschwiler Moos	Hermetschwil-Staffeln, Rottenschwil	AG	2001	
AG0279	Schümel	Holderbank	AG	2001	
AG0284	Graströchni Hard	Holziken	AG	2001	
AG0294	Rüssmatten	Jonen	AG	2001	
AG0669	Heftihof	Jonen, Rottenschwil	AG	2001	
AG0303	Birristrott	Kaisten	AG	2001	
AG0307	Tägerhau	Kaisten	AG	2001	
AG0305	Heuberg	Kaisten, Laufenburg, Sulz	AG	2001	
AG0340	Giriz	Koblenz	AG	2001	
AG0344	Hof	Kölliken	AG	2001	
AG0348	Grossmoos	Kölliken	AG	2001	
AG0349	Walisgraben	Kölliken	AG	2001	
AG0350	Zopfmatt	Kölliken	AG	2001	
AG0368	Ägerten	Künten	AG	2001	
AG0369	Buechhübel	Künten, Stetten	AG	2001	
AG0404	Gippinger Grien	Leuggern	AG	2001	
AG0407	Sagenmülitäli	Linn	AG	2001	
AG0416	Talweiher	Magden	AG	2001	
AG0436	Äbereich	Mellingen, Stetten	AG	2001	
AG0910	Ägelmoos	Mellingen, Wohlenschwil	AG	2001	
AG0440	Schmulzenchopf	Menziken	AG	2001	
AG0449	Oberschachen	Merenschwand	AG	2001	
AG0454	Schorengrindel	Merenschwand	AG	2001	
AG0459	Unterrütiweiher	Merenschwand	AG	2001	
AG0461	Sibeneichen	Merenschwand	AG	2001	
AG2409	Dorfrüti	Merenschwand	AG	2001	
AG0468	Breitsee	Möhlin	AG	2001	
AG0469	Wolfhöhli/Chüelespitz	Möhlin	AG	2007	
AG0471	Haumättli	Möhlin	AG	2001	
AG0619	Steppberg	Möhlin, Rheinfelden	AG	2001	
AG2008	Lindimatt	Möriken-Wildegg	AG	2001	
AG0276	Kohlschwärzi	Muhen	AG	2001	
AG0493	Schoren Schachen	Mühlau	AG	2001	
AG2725	Maiholz	Muri	AG	2001	
AG0522	Torfmoos	Niederrohrdorf	AG	2001	
AG0523	Egelmoos	Niederrohrdorf	AG	2001	
AG2015	Bösimoos	Niederrohrdorf, Stetten	AG	2001	
AG0530	Hard	Niederwil	AG	2001	
AG0533	Krähhübel	Niederwil	AG	2001	
AG0534	Breiti	Niederwil	AG	2001	
AG2011	Eggimoos	Niederwil	AG	2001	
AG3431	Schlaufe	Niederwil	AG	2007	
AG0526	Löliweiher	Niederwil, Tägerig	AG	2001	
AG0527	Chlosteräcker	Niederwil, Tägerig	AG	2001	
AG0525	Rütermoos	Niederwil, Wohlen	AG	2001	
AG2012	Friedgraben	Oberlunkhofen, Rottenschwil	AG	2001	
AG0569	Schachen	Oberrüti	AG	2001	
AG0582	Looweiher/Heidenloch	Oftringen	AG	2001	
AG2150	Zollester	Reinach	AG	2001	
AG0620	Tannenchopf	Rheinfelden	AG	2001	
AG0640	Chli Rhy	Rietheim	AG	2001	
AG0649	Eiholz	Rohr	AG	2001	
AG0655	Stockmösli	Rothrist	AG	2001	
AG0667	Giriz	Rottenschwil	AG	2001	
AG0671	Stille Reuss	Rottenschwil	AG	2001	
AG0668	Schnäggenmatten	Rottenschwil, Unterlunkhofen	AG	2001	
AG0681	Langenmoos	Sarmenstorf	AG	2001	
AG2230	Buech/Steiacher	Schafisheim, Staufen	AG	2007	
AG0734	Töniweiher	Sins	AG	2001	
AG0742	Franzosenweiher und Altes Bad	Spreitenbach	AG	2001	
AG0749	Kaltacker	Staffelbach	AG	2001	
AG0759	Wildenau	Stetten	AG	2001	
AG0765	Ramoos	Strengelbach	AG	2001	
AG0766	Ziegelmatt	Strengelbach	AG	2001	
AG0780	Schwarzrain	Sulz	AG	2001	
AG2933	Weihermatthau	Tägerig	AG	2001	
AG0799	Schwarzmatt	Unterbözberg	AG	2001	
AG0820	Breitmoos	Untersiggenthal	AG	2001	
AG2016	Unterzelg	Villmergen	AG	2001	
AG3054	Chalofe	Villmergen	AG	2001	
AG0881	Windischer Schachen	Windisch	AG	2001	
AG0882	Fröschegräbe	Windisch	AG	2001	
AG0925	Lochmatt	Zeihen	AG	2001	
AG0931	Ägelsee	Zeiningen	AG	2001	
AG0941	Bärenmoosweiher	Zofingen	AG	2001	
AG0960	Im See	Zurzach	AG	2001	
AR0118	Wissenbachschlucht	Herisau	AR	2001	
BE0047	Mumenthaler Weiher	Aarwangen, Roggwil, Wynau	BE	2001	
BE0323	Hahnenmoosbergli	Adelboden, Lenk	BE	2003	
BE0332	Sumpf unterh. Station Heustrich	Aeschi bei Spiez	BE	2007	
BE0569	Märchligenau-Flühli	Allmendingen, Rubigen	BE	2001	2003
BE0151	Kieswerk Schopsberg	Arch	BE	2003	
BE0152	Widi	Arch	BE	2001	
BE0049	Vogelraupfi	Bannwil, Walliswil bei Niederbipp	BE	2003	
BE0183	Bermoos	Bäriswil, Mattstetten, Urtenen	BE	2001	
BE0968	Aareaue bei Jägerheim	Belp	BE	2001	
BE0973	Belpau	Belp	BE	2001	
BE0071	Elfenaureservat	Bern, Muri bei Bern	BE	2001	
BE0121	Mettlenweiher	Bern, Muri bei Bern	BE	2001	
BE0149	Mettmoos	Biel	BE	2001	
BE0051	Bleienbacher Torfsee und Sängeli	Bleienbach, Thunstetten	BE	2001	
BE0696	Grube uf der Hole	Bühl	BE	2001	
BE0643	Mont Girod 1	Champoz	BE	2001	
BE0649	Lac Vert	Court	BE	2001	
BE0650	Mont Girod 2	Court	BE	2001	
BE1136	Vieille Birse	Court, Sorvilier	BE	2001	
BE0742	Ägelsee-Moor	Diemtigen	BE	2001	
BE0756	Flachmoor Oberste Gurbs	Diemtigen	BE	2001	
BE0171	Tümpel b. Schulhaus	Dotzigen	BE	2003	
BE0174	Tümpel bei Alter Aare Meienried	Dotzigen, Meienried	BE	2003	
BE0719	Grien nordwestl. Dotzigen	Dotzigen, Schwadernau	BE	2003	
BE1120	Heideweg	Erlach, Twann	BE	2003	
BE0337	Stirple	Frutigen	BE	2003	
BE0269	Lätti Gals	Gals	BE	2001	
BE0274	Nordteil Fanel	Gampelen	BE	2001	
BE0612	Oltigenmatt	Golaten, Wileroltigen	BE	2001	
BE0383	Chratzera	Grindelwald	BE	2003	
BE0397	Tümpel östl. Underläger	Grindelwald	BE	2003	
BE0403	Grosse Scheidegg	Grindelwald	BE	2003	
BE0897	Weiher am Rüschbach	Gsteig	BE	2001	
BE0898	Riedgebiet Saligrabe	Gsteig	BE	2001	
BE0939	Weiher ob Ottenleuebad	Guggisberg	BE	2001	
BE0815	Juchli Käserstatt	Hasliberg	BE	2003	
BE0199	Bärmatten	Hindelbank	BE	2007	
BE0524	Wyssensee	Hofstetten bei Brienz	BE	2001	
BE0281	Leuschelzmoos	Ins	BE	2001	
BE0283	Inser-Weiher	Ins	BE	2001	
BE0010	Büeltigen-Weiher	Kallnach	BE	2001	
BE0341	Spittelmatte	Kandersteg	BE	2001	
BE0016	Waldgrube Tannholz	Kappelen	BE	2001	
BE0558	Neuenzälgau	Kiesen	BE	2001	
BE0116	Schnydere ob Eichholz	Köniz	BE	2001	
BE0618	Röselisee	Kriechenwil	BE	2001	
BE1139	Biaufond	La Ferrière	BE	2001	
BE0223	Sessenais	La Heutte, Sonceboz-Sombeval	BE	2001	
BE0913	Lauenensee	Lauenen	BE	2001	
BE0917	Weiher Obere Brüesche	Lauenen	BE	2003	
BE0534	Wengernalp Weiher	Lauterbrunnen	BE	2003	
BE0862	Weiher am Fuss der Gryde	Lenk	BE	2001	
BE0020	Grube Hardern	Lyss	BE	2003	
BE1127	Muttli	Müntschemier	BE	2001	
BE0120	Wehrliau Muribadparkplatz	Muri bei Bern	BE	2003	
BE1095	Colas Grube	Niederbipp	BE	2003	
BE1101	Erlimoos	Oberbipp	BE	2001	
BE0770	Weiher Hinter Richisalp	Oberwil im Simmental	BE	2007	
BE0705	Römerareal	Orpund	BE	2001	
BE0262	Etang de Sagne	Plagne, Vauffelin	BE	2001	
BE0358	Kanderauen bei Mülenen	Reichenbach im Kandertal	BE	2001	
BE0057	Schmittenweiher	Roggwil	BE	2001	
BE0237	Le Bain, Oversat	Romont	BE	2003	
BE1023	Schallenberg Tümpel	Röthenbach im Emmental	BE	2001	
BE0574	Kleinhöchstettenau	Rubigen	BE	2001	
BE0947	Fischbächen Weiher	Rüschegg	BE	2003	
BE0998	Fischzuchtteich Gurnigelbad	Rüti bei Riggisberg	BE	2003	
BE0930	Tümpel Hornberg Läger	Saanen	BE	2003	
BE0708	Reservat Gryfeberg	Safnern	BE	2001	
BE0710	Waldgrube Scheuren, Orpundinsel	Safnern, Scheuren	BE	2001	
BE0672	La Noz, tourbière de La Sagne	Saicourt	BE	2001	
BE0240	Tourbière de la Chaux d'Abel	Saint-Imier, Sonvilier	BE	2001	
BE1027	Seeli-Egg, Lochsiten	Schangnau	BE	2001	
BE0061	Alte Kiesgrube Schwarzhäusern	Schwarzhäusern	BE	2001	
BE0678	Les Chaufours	Sorvilier	BE	2001	
BE1135	Cornez de la Mairie	Sorvilier	BE	2001	
BE1081	Buechholz Weiher	Sumiswald	BE	2001	
BE0684	Le Châtelet	Tavannes	BE	2003	
BE1065	Thuner Allmend	Thierachern, Thun	BE	2003	
BE1064	Gwattmösli	Thun	BE	2001	
BE1063	Schintere Lerchenfeld	Thun, Uetendorf	BE	2001	2007
BE0254	La Marnière	Tramelan	BE	2001	
BE0556	Weissenau	Unterseen	BE	2001	
BE0065	Chlyrot Weiher	Untersteckholz	BE	2003	
BE0962	Waldgass-Grube	Wahlern	BE	2001	
BE0181	Wengimoos	Wengi	BE	2001	
BE0783	Au-Gand Kander	Wimmis	BE	2003	
BE0132	Leubachbucht, Wohlensee-Nordufer	Wohlen bei Bern	BE	2001	
BE0140	Lörmoos	Wohlen bei Bern	BE	2001	
BE0584	Feuerweiher Houti	Worb	BE	2001	
BE0588	Rüfenachtmoos	Worb	BE	2001	
BL0111	Talweiher	Anwil, Oltingen, Rothenfluh	BL	2001	
BL0173	Herzogenmatt	Binningen, Oberwil	BL	2001	
BL0171	Bammertsgraben	Bottmingen	BL	2001	
BL0593	Uf Sal Tonwarenfabrik	Laufen	BL	2001	
BL0598	Steinbruch Andil	Liesberg	BL	2001	
BL0599	Steingrube Bohlberg	Liesberg	BL	2001	
BL0045	Ziegelei Oberwil	Oberwil	BL	2001	2007
BL0062	Buechloch	Therwil	BL	2001	
BL0064	Mooswasen	Therwil	BL	2001	
BS0004	Eisweiher und Wiesenmatten	Riehen	BS	2001	
BS0010	Autal	Riehen	BS	2001	
FR0220	Petite Sarine	Arconciel, Corpataux-Magnedens, Hauterive, Marly, Rossens, Treyvaux	FR	2001	
FR0211	La Grève, Autavaux, Forel	Autavaux, Estavayer-le-Lac, Forel	FR	2001	
FR0216	Ancienne carrière Les Saus	Châbles	FR	2003	
FR0215	Les Grèves, Cheyres-Font	Châbles, Cheyres, Estavayer-le-Lac, Font	FR	2001	
FR0035	Poutes Paluds	Charmey	FR	2001	
FR0201	Lac des Joncs	Châtel-Saint-Denis	FR	2001	
FR0214	Les Grèves, Cheyres sud	Cheyres	FR	2001	
FR0102	Les Dailles	Corpataux-Magnedens	FR	2001	
FR0099	La Tuilerie	Cottens, La Brillaz	FR	2001	
FR0005	Les Grèves, Gletterens-Portalban	Delley, Gletterens, Portalban	FR	2001	
FR0144	Saaneboden	Düdingen	FR	2001	
FR0145	Stöckholz	Düdingen	FR	2001	
FR0147	Düdingermoos	Düdingen	FR	2001	
FR0276	Vuibroye	Ecublens, Rue	FR	2001	
FR0089	Le Mouret	Essert	FR	2001	
FR0088	Le Taconnet	Essert, Ferpicloz	FR	2001	
FR0043	Le Liti	Estavannens	FR	2001	
FR0210	La Grève, La Grande Gouille	Estavayer-le-Lac	FR	2001	
FR0052	Gros Chadoua	Grandvillard	FR	2001	
FR0053	Le Mongeron	Gruyères	FR	2001	
FR0132	Auried	Kleinbösingen	FR	2001	
FR0100	Les Nex	La Brillaz	FR	2001	
FR0217	Pra-les-Bous	Léchelles, Montagny	FR	2001	
FR0059	Le Lity	Lessoc	FR	2001	
FR0133	Ehemalige Kiesgrube Reben	Liebistorf	FR	2003	
FR0161	Rohrmoos	Plaffeien	FR	2001	
FR0166	Nümatt	Plasselb	FR	2001	
FR0170	Entenmoos	Rechthalten	FR	2001	
FR0115	Sur Plian, Les Cases	Rossens	FR	2001	
FR0218	Overesses	Villarepos	FR	2001	
GE0010	Bois des Mouilles	Bernex, Onex, Confignon	GE	2001	2007
GE0011	La Petite Grave	Cartigny	GE	2001	2007
GE0014	Moulin de Vert	Cartigny	GE	2001	2007
GE0046	Saint-Victor	Cartigny, Bernex, Aire-la-Ville	GE	2007	
GE0015	Raclerets	Chancy	GE	2001	2007
GE0044	Château de Choulex	Choulex	GE	2001	2007
GE0019	Pointe à la Bise	Collonge-Bellerive	GE	2001	2007
GE0033	Teppes de Verbois	Dardagny, Russin	GE	2001	2007
GE0022	L'Allondon	Dardagny, Russin, Satigny	GE	2001	2007
GE0025	Prés de Villette	Gy	GE	2001	2007
GE0026	Arales	Jussy	GE	2007	
GE0043	Rappes	Jussy	GE	2001	2007
GE0059	Dolliets	Jussy, Presinge	GE	2007	
GE0028	Laconnex	Laconnex	GE	2001	2007
GE0029	Haute Seymaz	Meinier, Choulex	GE	2007	
GE0068	Miolan	Meinier, Choulex	GE	2007	
GE0030	Mategnin	Meyrin	GE	2001	2007
GE0049	Bistoquette et Paradis	Plan-les-Ouates	GE	2007	
GE0040	Pré-Béroux	Versoix	GE	2007	
GE0042	Douves	Versoix	GE	2001	2007
GE0050	Combes Chappuis	Versoix	GE	2007	
GL0002	Niederriet	Bilten	GL	2001	
GL0018	Talsee	Filzbach	GL	2001	
GL0017	Walenberg	Filzbach, Mollis	GL	2001	
GL0020	Klöntalersee Nordostufer	Glarus	GL	2001	
GL0096	Klöntalersee Vorauen	Glarus	GL	2001	
GL0037	Oberblegisee	Luchsingen	GL	2001	
GL0047	Feldbach	Mollis	GL	2001	
GR0043	Palüds - Agnas	Bever	GR	2001	
GR0397	Bregl	Bonaduz, Domat/Ems, Rhäzüns	GR	2001	
GR0251	Pian di Alne	Cauco, Rossa	GR	2001	
GR0457	Pro Niev	Feldis/Veulden	GR	2001	
GR0392	Ellwald	Fläsch	GR	2001	
GR0570	Tola	Fläsch	GR	2001	
GR0102	Lais da Pesch	Ftan	GR	2001	
GR0567	Punt Planet	Fuldera	GR	2001	
GR0325	Plaun da Foppas	Ilanz	GR	2001	
GR0338	Lag digl Oberst	Laax	GR	2001	
GR0386	Siechenstuden	Maienfeld	GR	2001	
GR0412	Länder	Maienfeld	GR	2003	
GR0591	Neugüeter	Maienfeld	GR	2001	
GR0361	Malixer Alp	Malix	GR	2001	
GR0391	Isla	Mastrils	GR	2003	
GR0159	Crest'Ota	Mon	GR	2001	
GR0143	Schler dal Podestà	Müstair	GR	2001	
GR0151	Rutisc Tonghi	Poschiavo	GR	2001	
GR0118	Plan da Chomps	Ramosch	GR	2001	
GR0120	Craistas	Ramosch	GR	2001	
GR0442	Alp da Razen	Rhäzüns	GR	2001	
GR0569	Lag Miert	Rhäzüns	GR	2001	
GR0339	Liger Alp Falätscha	Safien	GR	2001	
TI0016	Isola Sgraver	San Vittore	GR	2001	
GR0470	Sayser See	Says	GR	2001	
GR0568	Flin	S-chanf	GR	2001	
GR0111	Duigls	Sent	GR	2001	
GR0572	Fröschaboda Val Madris	Soglio	GR	2001	
GR0141	Plaun Schumpeder	Sta. Maria Val Müstair	GR	2001	
GR0140	Lai da Valpaschun	Sta. Maria Val Müstair, Valchava	GR	2001	
GR0082	Cavloc	Stampa	GR	2001	
GR0396	Girsch	Tamins	GR	2003	
GR0106	Lai da Tarasp	Tarasp	GR	2001	
GR0395	Zizerser Gumpen	Trimmis, Zizers	GR	2001	
GR0129	Lai da Juata	Tschierv, Valchava	GR	2001	
GR0121	Ischlas da Strada	Tschlin	GR	2003	
GR0310	Ils Lags Alp Ramosa	Vrin	GR	2001	
GR0319	Ogna da Pardiala	Waltensburg/Vuorz	GR	2001	
JU0200	Les Esserts	Boécourt	JU	2001	
JU7501	Etangs de Bonfol	Bonfol	JU	2001	
JU7508	Les Queues de Chats	Bonfol	JU	2001	
JU7500	Etangs Rougeat	Bonfol, Vendlincourt	JU	2001	
JU8101	La Coeuvatte	Coeuve	JU	2007	
JU0701	Sous Bâme	Courfaivre	JU	2001	
JU0703	En Cortio	Courfaivre	JU	2001	
JU8400	Le Martinet	Courgenay	JU	2001	
JU0902	Le Colliard	Courroux	JU	2001	
JU1002	Bois de Chaux	Courtetelle	JU	2001	
JU8700	Les Coeudres	Damphreux	JU	2003	
JU1400	Combe Tabeillon	Glovelier	JU	2001	
JU1405	Combe du Bez	Glovelier	JU	2001	
JU1406	Foradrai	Glovelier	JU	2001	
JU4900	La Vauchotte - Bois Banal	Goumois	JU	2001	
JU5412	La Goule - Le Theusseret	Goumois, Le Noirmont	JU	2001	
JU5001	Dos le Cras	Lajoux	JU	2001	
JU5800	Côte d'Oye	Lajoux, Saint-Brais	JU	2001	
JU5701	La Gruère	Le Bémont, Saignelégier	JU	2001	
JU5702	Les Royes	Le Bémont, Saignelégier	JU	2001	
JU5413	La Bouège - La Goule	Le Noirmont	JU	2001	
JU4300	Les Saignes	Le Noirmont, Les Breuleux	JU	2001	2007
BE1139	Biaufond	Les Bois	JU	2001	
JU4200	Le Refrain - La Bouège	Les Bois, Le Noirmont	JU	2001	
JU4806	La Sagne à Droz	Les Genevez	JU	2001	
JU5600	Bois Banal - Moulin Jeannotat	Les Pommerats	JU	2001	
JU5606	Les Pommerats	Les Pommerats	JU	2001	
JU1600	Les Charbonnières	Mettembert	JU	2001	
JU5101	Plain de Saigne	Montfaucon	JU	2001	
JU1902	Moulin de Bavelier	Pleigne	JU	2001	
JU7000	Etang Corbat	Porrentruy	JU	2003	
JU6600	Lorette	Saint-Ursanne	JU	2001	
JU6604	Bellefontaine	Saint-Ursanne	JU	2001	
JU2400	La Réselle	Soyhières	JU	2001	
JU6400	Etangs de Vendlincourt	Vendlincourt	JU	2001	
LU0523	Forenmoos	Adligenswil, Meggen	LU	2001	
LU0524	Moosweiher	Adligenswil, Udligenswil	LU	2001	
LU0003	Stadelmoosweiher	Alberswil	LU	2001	
LU0005	Schlossweiher Altishofen	Altishofen	LU	2001	
LU0010	Hasliweiher	Ballwil	LU	2001	
LU0013	Gütschweiher	Ballwil	LU	2001	
LU0532	Chänzeli/Schachen	Buchrain, Emmen	LU	2001	
LU0230	Burgschachen	Buchrain, Inwil	LU	2001	
LU0033	Uffikonermoos	Buchs, Dagmersellen	LU	2001	
LU0036	Hetzligermoos	Buttisholz	LU	2001	
LU0047	Chalchloch	Doppleschwand, Entlebuch	LU	2003	
LU0055	Risch, Rotseeried	Ebikon	LU	2001	
LU0060	Ottigenbüel	Ebikon	LU	2001	
LU0454	Wauwilermoos	Egolzwil, Ettiswil, Kottwil, Schötz, Wauwil	LU	2001	
LU0086	Riffigweiher	Emmen	LU	2001	
LU0105	Fuchseren	Entlebuch	LU	2001	
LU0116	Gürmschmoos	Entlebuch	LU	2001	
LU0119	Moos	Eschenbach	LU	2001	
LU0122	Mettlenmoos	Eschenbach	LU	2001	
LU0133	Naturlehrgebiet Buechwald	Ettiswil, Grosswangen	LU	2001	
LU0155	Unter Chlotisberg	Gelfingen	LU	2001	
LU0156	Unterbüel	Gelfingen	LU	2003	
LU0669	Lättloch	Gettnau	LU	2001	
LU0222	Gütsch/Feldhof	Gisikon, Honau	LU	2001	
LU0512	Ostergau	Grosswangen, Willisau Land	LU	2001	
LU0210	Schützenfeld - Moospünten	Hochdorf	LU	2003	
LU0213	Turbiweiher/Ronfeldweiher	Hochdorf, Römerswil	LU	2001	
LU0227	Steinibachried	Horw	LU	2001	
LU0606	Wannenholz	Inwil	LU	2001	
LU0246	Wolermoos	Knutwil	LU	2001	
LU0248	Hagimoos	Kottwil, Mauensee	LU	2003	
LU0354	Moosschürweiher	Littau, Neuenkirch	LU	2001	
LU0331	Tuetenseeli	Menznau	LU	2003	
LU0341	Vogelmoos	Neudorf	LU	2001	
LU0359	Chüsenrainwald	Neuenkirch	LU	2001	
LU0360	Mühleweiher	Nottwil	LU	2001	
LU0408	Staudenschachen Südarm	Root	LU	2001	
LU0410	Unterallmend	Root	LU	2001	
LU0425	Turbemoos (Forenwäldli)	Ruswil	LU	2001	
LU0469	NE Hirsboden	Schwarzenberg	LU	2001	
LU0476	Hinter Roren	Schwarzenberg	LU	2001	
LU0434	Steinibüelweier	Sempach	LU	2001	
LU0486	Grueb Grossfeld	Triengen	LU	2001	
LU0491	Wagenmoos	Udligenswil	LU	2001	
LU0519	Grube Stoos Hüswil	Zell, Ufhusen	LU	2001	
NE0108	Pointe du Grain	Bevaix, Cortaillod	NE	2001	
NE0001	Marnière du Plan du Bois	Bôle	NE	2001	
NE0005	La Gare	Boudry	NE	2003	
NE0068	La Paulière	Coffrane	NE	2001	
NE0107	La Fabrique	Cortaillod	NE	2001	
NE0013	Les Eplatures	La Chaux-de-Fonds	NE	2003	
NE0099	Le Foulet	La Chaux-de-Fonds	NE	2001	
BE1139	Biaufond	La Chaux-de-Fonds	NE	2001	
NE0018	La Galandrure	Les Brenets	NE	2001	
NE0106	Les Goudebas	Les Brenets	NE	2003	
NE0056	La Marnière d'Hauterive	Saint-Blaise	NE	2001	
NE0058	Le Loclat	Saint-Blaise	NE	2001	
NW0059	Gnappiried	Stans	NW	2001	
NW0061	Vierwaldstättersee Hüttenort	Stansstad	NW	2001	
NW0062	Stansstader Ried/Rotzloch	Stansstad	NW	2001	
NW0069	Chrotteseeli Obbürgen	Stansstad	NW	2001	
OW0001	Schlierenrüti, Reservat Sarna	Alpnach	OW	2001	
OW0035	Glaubenbielen Ribihütte	Giswil	OW	2007	
OW0045	Mörlisee	Giswil	OW	2001	
OW0047	Jänzimatt	Giswil	OW	2007	
OW0063	Usser Allmend	Giswil	OW	2007	
OW0078	Gerzensee, Blindseeli	Kerns	OW	2001	
OW0213	Melbach	Kerns	OW	2001	
OW0123	Hanenriet	Sachseln	OW	2001	
OW0127	Sachsler Seefeld	Sachseln	OW	2001	
OW0167	Sewenseeli	Sarnen	OW	2001	
OW0201	Ritzenmattseeli	Sarnen	OW	2007	
OW0204	Obermatteggweiher	Sarnen	OW	2007	
SG0140	Banriet/Burst	Altstätten	SG	2001	
SG0179	Spitzmäder	Altstätten, Oberriet	SG	2001	
SG0365	Baggerseen im Staffelriet	Benken	SG	2001	
SG0367	Mösli	Benken	SG	2001	
SG0374	Kaltbrunnerriet	Benken, Kaltbrunn, Uznach	SG	2001	
SG0030	Huebermoos	Berg, Wittenbach	SG	2001	
SG0561	Hasenlooweiher	Bronschhofen	SG	2001	
SG0205	Retentionsbecken Ceres Rhein-Au	Buchs	SG	2001	
SG0201	Wiesenfurt	Buchs, Sennwald	SG	2001	
SG0496	Zuckenmattweiher	Bütschwil	SG	2001	
SG0515	Magdenau	Degersheim	SG	2001	
SG0094	Moosanger	Diepoldsau	SG	2001	
SG0396	Siessenweiher	Eschenbach	SG	2001	
AR0118	Wissenbachschlucht	Flawil	SG	2001	
SG0525	Glattal	Flawil, Gossau	SG	2001	
SG0021	Ochsenweid	Gaiserwald, St. Gallen	SG	2001	
SG0033	Kiesgrube Schuppis	Goldach	SG	2001	
SG0398	Briggisweiher N Auenhof	Goldingen	SG	2001	
SG0598	Arniger Witi	Gossau	SG	2001	
SG0600	Espel	Gossau	SG	2001	
SG0603	Waffenplatz Breitfeld	Gossau, St. Gallen	SG	2001	
SG0399	Joner Allmeind	Jona	SG	2001	
SG0552	Bettenauerweier	Jonschwil, Oberuzwil	SG	2001	
SG0506	Turpenriet	Kirchberg	SG	2001	
TG0040	Hudelmoos	Muolen	SG	2001	
SG0563	Huserfelsen, Himmelbleichi	Niederbüren	SG	2001	
SG0574	Ehemalige Kiesgrube Au	Oberbüren	SG	2001	
SG0170	Alte Lehmgrube Hilpert	Oberriet	SG	2001	
SG0177	Wichenstein	Oberriet	SG	2001	
SG0103	Bisen	Rheineck, Thal	SG	2001	
SG0384	St. Sebastian	Schänis	SG	2001	
SG0405	Allmeind	Schmerikon	SG	2001	
SG0236	Burstried, Galgenmad	Sennwald	SG	2001	
SG0248	Egelsee bei Bad Forstegg	Sennwald	SG	2001	
SG0009	Bildweiher	St. Gallen	SG	2001	
SG0020	Wenigerweiher	St. Gallen	SG	2001	
SG0110	Eselschwanz	St. Margrethen	SG	2001	
SG0113	Bodenseeriet, Altenrhein	Thal	SG	2001	
SG0118	Fuchsloch-Buriet	Thal	SG	2001	
SG0059	Schlossweiher	Untereggen	SG	2001	
SG0554	Gill-Henau Reservat	Uzwil	SG	2001	
SG0342	Kiessammler Vilters	Vilters-Wangs	SG	2001	
SG0344	Kiesgrube Feerbach	Vilters-Wangs	SG	2001	
SG0614	Weiher NE Hohfirst	Waldkirch	SG	2001	
SG0027	Ziegelei Bruggwald	Wittenbach	SG	2001	
SG0587	Riet Zuzwil	Zuzwil	SG	2001	
SH0031	Bohnerzgruben Färberwiesli	Beringen	SH	2001	
SH3201	Bohnerzgruben Chäferhölzli	Beringen	SH	2001	
SH0070	Lehmlöcher Dicki	Büttenhardt, Lohn	SH	2001	
SH1501	Bachtelli/Seeli	Dörflingen	SH	2001	
SH7101	Weiher Lochgraben	Hallau	SH	2001	
SH6203	Alte Biberschleife	Hemishofen	SH	2001	
SH0069	Lehmlöcher Rüti	Lohn	SH	2001	
SH0401	Feuchtgebiet Widen	Neunkirch	SH	2001	
SH6301	Ried/Lehmgrueb Hofenacker	Ramsen	SH	2001	
SH0043	Eschheimer Weiher	Schaffhausen	SH	2001	
SH1901	Rohrenbüeli-Stritholz	Schaffhausen, Stetten	SH	2001	
SH3902	Moos-Buck Herblingen	Schaffhausen, Stetten	SH	2001	
SH6401	Egelsee Degerfeld Wagenhausen	Stein am Rhein	SH	2001	
SH0021	Morgetshofsee	Thayngen	SH	2001	
SO0083	Erlenmoos, Haag	Bettlach	SO	2001	
SO0084	Biedermannsgrube	Feldbrunnen-St. Niklaus	SO	2001	
SO0065	Tümpel untere Erli	Hauenstein-Ifenthal	SO	2001	
SO0069	Obergösger Schachen	Obergösgen	SO	2001	
SO0044	Tümpel Stierenberg	Welschenrohr	SO	2001	
SO0011	Chli Aarli	Wolfwil	SO	2001	
SZ0068	Sägel, Schutt, Lauerzersee	Arth, Lauerz, Steinen	SZ	2001	
SZ0003	Oberer Sihlsee Euthal	Einsiedeln	SZ	2001	
SZ0004	Sihlsee S Schönbächli	Einsiedeln	SZ	2001	
SZ0005	Sihlsee Steinbach (Lukasrank)	Einsiedeln	SZ	2001	
SZ0007	Klosterweiher	Einsiedeln	SZ	2001	
SZ0010	Trachslauerweiher	Einsiedeln	SZ	2001	
SZ0002	Breitried/Schützenried	Einsiedeln, Unteriberg	SZ	2001	
SZ0034	Dreiwässern	Feusisberg	SZ	2001	
SZ0077	Klosterried Ingenbohl	Ingenbohl	SZ	2001	
SZ0060	Reumeren	Reichenburg	SZ	2001	
SZ0138	Aazopf	Steinen	SZ	2001	
SZ0152	Bätzimatt	Tuggen	SZ	2001	
TG0104	Luggeseeli	Aadorf	TG	2003	
TG0509	Kiesgrube Buech	Amlikon-Bissegg	TG	2007	
TG0034	Biessenhofer Weiher	Amriswil, Erlen	TG	2001	
TG0040	Hudelmoos	Amriswil, Zihlschlacht-Sitterdorf	TG	2001	
TG0082	Sürch	Basadingen-Schlattingen	TG	2003	
TG0438	Heeristobel	Berlingen, Steckborn	TG	2003	2007
TG0276	Bichelsee	Bichelsee-Balterswil	TG	2007	
TG0472	Lehmgrube Opfershofen	Bürglen	TG	2001	
TG0466	Sangen - Mülifang	Bürglen, Weinfelden	TG	2001	2003
TG0007	Kiesgrube Atzenholz	Egnach	TG	2003	
TG0072	Wiimoos	Erlen, Sulgen	TG	2003	
TG0231	Espen Riet	Ermatingen, Gottlieben	TG	2007	
TG0367	Kiesgruben Neuhus-Bälisteig	Eschenz, Wagenhausen	TG	2001	
TG0127	Allmend	Felben-Wellhausen, Frauenfeld	TG	2001	
TG0116	Baggersee Chasperäcker	Frauenfeld	TG	2001	
TG0117	Ägelsee	Gachnang	TG	2001	
TG0049	Hauptwiler Weiher	Hauptwil-Gottshaus	TG	2003	
TG0062	Kiesgrube Freudenberg	Hohentannen	TG	2001	
TG0386	Bächler	Homburg	TG	2003	
TG0387	Grube Trubeschloo	Homburg	TG	2001	
TG0425	Grube Gündelhart	Homburg	TG	2007	
TG0429	Wolfsgrueb	Homburg	TG	2007	
TG0432	Waldriet Grosswis	Homburg	TG	2001	
TG0179	Grüt - Bietenhart - Wolfsbüel	Hüttlingen, Thundorf	TG	2001	
TG0388	Hüttwiler Seen	Hüttwilen, Uesslingen-Buch	TG	2001	
TG0213	Bommer Weiher	Kemmental	TG	2003	
TG0488	Kiesgrube Schürliwiesen	Kemmental	TG	2001	
TG0244	Seeburg	Kreuzlingen	TG	2001	2007
TG0242	Lengwiler Weiher	Kreuzlingen, Lengwil	TG	2001	
TG0294	Lommiser Riet	Lommis	TG	2003	
TG0165	Mösliweiher	Neunforn	TG	2003	
TG0166	Müliweier	Neunforn	TG	2003	
TG0170	Barchetsee	Neunforn	TG	2001	
TG0507	Aue N Aachmündung	Romanshorn	TG	2001	
TG0424	Ägelsee	Salenstein	TG	2003	
TG0093	Bächli - Gishalde	Schlatt	TG	2003	
TG0094	Riet	Schlatt	TG	2003	
TG0089	Schaarenwies/Schaarenwald	Schlatt, Diessenhofen	TG	2007	
TG0316	Ägelsee	Sirnach, Wilen	TG	2007	
TG0177	Kiesgrube Bärg	Stettfurt	TG	2003	
TG0069	Langstuden Befang	Sulgen	TG	2007	
TG0261	Seerhein Chuehorn - Paradies	Tägerwilen	TG	2007	
TG0197	Kiesweiher Weidacker	Uesslingen-Buch	TG	2001	
TG0200	Googlete	Uesslingen-Buch	TG	2003	
TG0413	Schoren Riet	Uesslingen-Buch, Warth-Weiningen	TG	2003	
TG0440	Etzwilerriet	Wagenhausen	TG	2001	
TG0443	Reservat Schule Kaltenbach	Wagenhausen	TG	2003	
TG0264	Kiesgrube Wolfsbüel	Wäldi	TG	2003	
TG0349	Grütried	Wängi	TG	2007	
TG0506	Weierwies	Warth-Weiningen	TG	2007	
TG0508	Stockrüti	Warth-Weiningen	TG	2003	
TG0462	Grube Moos N Weerswilen	Weinfelden	TG	2003	
TG0494	Pflanzgarten Tätsch	Weinfelden	TG	2003	
TG0498	Güttingersrüti	Weinfelden	TG	2001	
TI0002	Laghetto d'Orbello	Arbedo-Castione	TI	2001	
TI0375	Delta della Maggia	Ascona, Locarno	TI	2001	
TI0127	Belladrum	Ascona, Losone	TI	2007	
TI0190	Stagno Figino-Cásoro	Barbengo	TI	2001	
TI0362	Rompiga	Barbengo, Grancia	TI	2001	
TI0193	Cava Rivaccia	Bedigliora	TI	2001	
TI0347	Pre Murin	Besazio, Ligornetto	TI	2001	
TI0376	Vigna	Besazio, Ligornetto	TI	2001	
TI0034	Bolla di Loderio	Biasca, Malvaglia	TI	2001	
TI0195	Stagno Agra	Cademario	TI	2001	
TI0005	Ciossa Antognini	Cadenazzo, Cugnasco, Gudo, Locarno	TI	2001	
TI0200	Laghetto	Camignolo	TI	2001	
TI0199	Gola di lago	Camignolo, Tesserete, Vaglio	TI	2001	
TI0335	Cava Motto Grande	Camorino	TI	2001	
TI0201	Lago di Lugano a Cantonetto	Caslano	TI	2001	
TI0379	Dosso dell'Ora - Dosso Bello	Castel San Pietro	TI	2001	
TI0232	Stagno Avra	Castel San Pietro	TI	2001	
TI0233	Pozza Bosco Penz	Chiasso	TI	2001	
TI0234	Stagni Campagna Seseglio	Chiasso	TI	2001	
TI0236	Pozza Moreggi Pedrinate	Chiasso	TI	2001	
TI0323	Lanca Saligin	Coglio, Lodano, Maggia, Moghegno	TI	2001	
TI0336	Valle della Motta	Coldrerio, Novazzano	TI	2001	
TI0306	Scairolo Vecchio	Collina d'Oro	TI	2007	
TI0202	Cava Gere Croglio	Croglio	TI	2001	
TI0238	Stagno Pra Vicc	Genestrerio	TI	2001	
TI0239	Prato Grande	Genestrerio	TI	2001	
TI0250	Meandri del Laveggio e Colombera	Genestrerio, Ligornetto, Stabio	TI	2001	
TI0211	Bosco Agnuzzo	Gentilino, Muzzano	TI	2001	
TI0337	Basciocca (ovest)	Giubiasco	TI	2001	
TI0152	Bolle di Magadino	Gordola, Locarno, Magadino, Tenero-Contra	TI	2001	
TI0008	Vigna lunga - Trebbione	Gudo	TI	2001	
TI0010	Stagno di Progero	Gudo	TI	2001	
TI0012	Malcantone	Gudo	TI	2001	
TI0373	Santa Maria	Gudo	TI	2007	
TI0021	Canale Demanio	Gudo, Sant'Antonino	TI	2001	
TI0139	Pescicoltura Golino	Intragna	TI	2001	
TI0258	Lanche di Iragna	Iragna	TI	2001	
TI0334	Pozza Monzell	Iragna	TI	2001	
TI0387	Canton del Marcio	Locarno	TI	2007	
TI0263	Stagno Campi Grandi	Lodrino	TI	2001	
TI0333	Campi Grandi	Lodrino	TI	2007	
TI0153	Barbescio - Bolletina Lunga	Losone	TI	2001	2007
TI0158	Piano di Arbigo	Losone	TI	2001	
TI0161	Bolle di Mondrigo	Losone	TI	2001	
TI0016	Isola Sgraver	Lumino	TI	2001	
TI0284	Laghetto Pianca	Maggia	TI	2001	
TI0285	Lago di Masnee	Maggia	TI	2001	
TI0019	Stagno Motto della Costa	Medeglia	TI	2001	
TI0241	Stagno Roggio	Meride	TI	2001	
TI0343	Stagno Guana	Meride	TI	2001	
TI0209	Ressiga	Monteggio	TI	2001	
TI0339	Stagni San Giorgio	Morbio Inferiore	TI	2007	
TI0212	Palude San Giorgio	Neggio, Agno	TI	2007	
TI0243	Pra Coltello	Novazzano	TI	2001	
TI0352	Valle della Motta/Ai Prati	Novazzano	TI	2001	
TI0378	Torrazza - Pra Signora	Novazzano	TI	2001	
TI0215	Lago d'Origlio	Origlio	TI	2007	
TI0171	Stagno Paron	Piazzogna	TI	2001	
TI0308	Pian Gallina	Porza	TI	2001	
TI0114	Cassina di Lago	Quinto	TI	2001	
TI0223	Pozza an est di Motto	Sessa	TI	2001	
TI0252	Cava Boschi	Stabio	TI	2001	
TI0464	Ca del Boscat	Stabio	TI	2007	
TI0228	Bolle di S. Martino	Vezia	TI	2001	
UR0077	Reussdelta	Altdorf, Flüelen, Seedorf	UR	2001	
UR0059	Bi den Seelenen	Isenthal	UR	2001	
UR0076	Schlossried	Seedorf	UR	2001	
UR0104	Alpler See	Sisikon	UR	2001	
VD0251	Bioute, Etang d'Arnex	Arnex-sur-Orbe	VD	2001	
VD0253	Entremur	Baulmes	VD	2001	
VD0093	Lac Coffy, Bois Ramel	Bettens, Bioley-Orjulaz, Boussens	VD	2003	
VD0006	Grand Marais	Bex	VD	2001	
VD0463	Canal de la Tuilière	Bex	VD	2007	
VD0067	Les Mossières	Bière, Saint-Livres	VD	2001	
VD0213	Les Bidonnes	Bogis-Bossey, Chavannes-de-Bogis, Crassier	VD	2001	
VD0362	Les Echelettes, La Léchère	Chamblon	VD	2001	
VD0225	Grand Bataillard, Marais de la Versoix	Chavannes-de-Bogis, Commugny	VD	2001	
VD0265	Pré Bernard, Creux-de-Terre	Chavornay	VD	2001	
VD0229	Bois de Chênes, Lac Vert	Coinsins, Genolier	VD	2007	
VD0224	Bois de Porte, Les Dailles	Commugny, Chavannes-des-Bois, Mies, Tannay	VD	2001	
VD0292	Prés de Rosex	Corcelles-près-Payerne, Payerne	VD	2001	
VD0101	Etang du Sépey	Cossonay	VD	2001	
VD0100	Etang de Vigny	Cossonay, La Chaux	VD	2001	
VD0140	Etang de la Scie	Fiez, Fontaines-sur-Grandson	VD	2001	
VD0232	Ballastière	Gland	VD	2001	
VD0177	Arborex	Lavigny, Villars-sous-Yens	VD	2001	
VD0275	Planches de Sergey, Chassagne	Les Clées, Sergey, Valeyres-sous-Rances	VD	2001	
VD0286	Les Mosses de la Rogivue	Maracon	VD	2001	2007
VD0299	Vernez-de-Chaux, La Coula	Payerne	VD	2001	
VD0300	Ancienne Broye	Payerne	VD	2001	
VD0133	Etang du Buron, Les Bioles	Penthéréaz	VD	2001	
VD0145	La Combaz, L'Abbaye	Romairon	VD	2001	
VD0357	Bendes	Saint-Légier-La Chiésaz	VD	2001	
VD0069	Borire, Corjon	Saubraz	VD	2001	
VS0050	Canal de Ceinture	Ardon, Chamoson	VS	2001	2007
VS0417	Bettmeralp	Betten	VS	2001	
VS0476	Le Malévoz	Collombey-Muraz, Monthey	VS	2001	
VS0075	Le Rosel	Dorénaz	VS	2001	2003
VS0427	Chiebodenstafel	Fiesch	VS	2001	
VS0066	Poutafontana	Grône, Sierre	VS	2001	
VS0028	Pfyn Ost, Rosensee	Leuk	VS	2001	
VS0432	Lüsga	Naters	VS	2001	
VS0026	Pfyn West	Salgesch	VS	2001	
VS0269	Lac de Mont d'Orge	Sion	VS	2001	
VS0349	Bonigersee	Törbel	VS	2001	
VS0136	Lac de Tanay	Vouvry	VS	2001	
VS0142	Montagne de l'Au	Vouvry	VS	2001	
ZG0046	Steinhauser Weiher	Baar, Steinhausen	ZG	2001	
ZG0012	Rüss-Spitz	Cham, Hünenberg	ZG	2001	
ZG0043	Binzmüli	Risch	ZG	2001	
ZH0002	Ried beim Scheibenstand	Adlikon	ZH	2001	
ZH0001	Eselacherried	Adlikon, Andelfingen	ZH	2001	
ZH0011	Mülliweiher, Weiher am Rossweg	Adliswil	ZH	2001	
ZH1213	Tüfi-Weiher	Adliswil, Zürich	ZH	2001	
ZH0016	Türlersee NW-Ufer	Aeugst am Albis	ZH	2001	
ZH0033	Kiesgrube Büelhüsli	Altikon	ZH	2007	
TG0197	Kiesweiher Weidacker	Altikon	ZH	2001	
ZH0034	Hätteliweiher Oberholz	Andelfingen	ZH	2001	
ZH0038	Erlenhofweiher	Andelfingen	ZH	2001	
ZH0053	Mülichrammweiher	Bäretswil	ZH	2001	
ZH0071	Feuerweiher am Homberg	Bassersdorf	ZH	2001	
ZH0076	Gruben Hard und Gubel	Bassersdorf	ZH	2001	
ZH0101	Kiesgrube Egghau	Birmensdorf	ZH	2001	
ZH0110	Weiher und Grube bei Ribacher	Bonstetten	ZH	2001	
ZH0144	Waldweiher im Oberholz/ Iffertsmoos	Dägerlen	ZH	2001	
ZH0148	Gurisee	Dägerlen, Dinhard	ZH	2001	
AG0742	Franzosenweiher und Altes Bad	Dietikon	ZH	2001	
ZH0072	Kiesgrube SW Runsberg	Dietlikon	ZH	2001	
ZH0162	Längerenweiher	Dinhard	ZH	2001	
ZH0896	Chrutzelried, Heidenried	Dübendorf, Schwerzenbach, Volketswil	ZH	2007	
ZH0201	Kiesgrube Garwid	Dürnten	ZH	2001	
ZH0264	Hungerseeli	Fehraltorf	ZH	2001	
ZH0458	Laichgebiet Bogen-Mesikon-Brand	Fehraltorf, Illnau-Effretikon	ZH	2001	
ZH0284	Altwässer Thurspitz	Flaach	ZH	2001	
ZH0289	Kiesgrube Buchbrunnen	Flaach	ZH	2007	
ZH0294	Präuselen	Flaach	ZH	2001	
ZH0295	Kiesgruben Ebnet	Flaach	ZH	2001	
ZH0310	Seewadel	Gossau	ZH	2001	
ZH0322	Isert Weiher	Gossau	ZH	2001	
ZH0975	Ambitzgi-/Bönlerried	Gossau, Wetzikon	ZH	2001	
ZH0352	Kiesgrube Ebertswil	Hausen am Albis	ZH	2001	
ZH0358	Weiher Fromoos (Gerhauweiher)	Hedingen	ZH	2001	
ZH0367	Mittelfeld-Kiesgrube	Hettlingen	ZH	2007	
ZH0403	Kiesgrube Hasel	Hittnau	ZH	2001	
ZH0444	Örmis	Illnau-Effretikon	ZH	2001	
ZH0450	Ried Schlimberg/Vogelholz	Illnau-Effretikon, Lindau	ZH	2001	
ZH0899	Kiesgrube Kindhausen (Blutzwies)	Illnau-Effretikon, Volketswil	ZH	2001	
ZH0468	Ried südl. Uerzlikon	Kappel am Albis	ZH	2001	
ZH0469	Alter Torfstich im Hagenholz	Kappel am Albis	ZH	2001	
ZG0046	Steinhauser Weiher	Kappel am Albis, Knonau	ZH	2001	
ZH0476	Räubrichseen	Kleinandelfingen	ZH	2007	
ZH0487	Enteler-Weiher	Kleinandelfingen, Marthalen	ZH	2001	
ZH0485	Mördersee und Pfaffensee	Kleinandelfingen, Ossingen	ZH	2001	
ZH0496	Waldried Homberg	Kloten	ZH	2001	
ZH0506	Lehmgrube beim Gwerfihölzli	Kloten	ZH	2001	
ZH0502	Eigental, Pantliried	Kloten, Oberembrach, Nürensdorf, Bassersdorf	ZH	2007	
ZH0548	Elliker Auen	Marthalen, Flaach	ZH	2001	
ZH0555	Grischei	Maschwanden	ZH	2001	2007
ZH0558	Kiesgrube Hinterfeld	Maschwanden	ZH	2001	
ZH0560	Biotop Süessplätz	Maur	ZH	2001	
ZH0577	Schützenweiher	Mettmenstetten	ZH	2001	
ZH0603	Biotop bei NOK Breite	Nürensdorf	ZH	2001	
ZH1205	Weiher Stigenhof	Oberembrach	ZH	2001	
ZH0616	Glattallaufgebiet Schlosswinkel-Peterli-Solachten	Oberglatt, Rümlang	ZH	2001	
ZH0628	Kiesgrube Härdli	Oberstammheim	ZH	2001	
ZH0629	Raffoltersee	Oberstammheim	ZH	2001	
ZH0638	Laichgebiet Lorzespitz	Obfelden	ZH	2001	
ZH0680	Ried Gmeimatt	Ottenbach	ZH	2007	
ZH0682	Kiesgrube Mülibach	Ottenbach	ZH	2007	
ZH0694	Weiher bei Hermatswil	Pfäffikon	ZH	2001	
ZH0973	Robenhauserried	Pfäffikon, Seegraeben, Wetzikon	ZH	2001	
ZH0714	Chatzensee, Chräenriet	Regensdorf, Zürich	ZH	2001	
ZH1037	Hänsiried	Regensdorf, Zürich	ZH	2001	
ZH0726	Kiesgrube Rhinauer Feld und Oberboden	Rheinau	ZH	2001	
ZH0732	Kiesgrube Ebnet	Rickenbach	ZH	2001	
ZH0752	Russiker Ried	Russikon	ZH	2001	
ZH1210	Kiesgrube Goldbach	Rüti	ZH	2001	
ZH0833	Weiher Gütighausen	Thalheim an der Thur	ZH	2001	
ZH0849	Truttiker Ried	Truttikon	ZH	2001	
TG0276	Bichelsee	Turbenthal	ZH	2007	
ZH0860	Seewädeli	Unterstammheim	ZH	2001	
ZH0868	Torfstiche im Seewadel	Uster	ZH	2001	
ZH0870	Werriker-/Glattenried	Uster	ZH	2001	
ZH0872	Hoperenried	Uster	ZH	2001	
ZH0877	Grube Seefeld und Stopperweiher	Uster	ZH	2001	
ZH0881	Grabenriet	Uster	ZH	2001	
ZH0887	Kiesgrube im Türli	Uster, Volketswil	ZH	2001	2007
ZH0944	Wollwisli	Wangen-Brüttisellen	ZH	2001	
ZH0946	Weiher Lochrüti	Wangen-Brüttisellen	ZH	2001	
ZH0953	Kiesgrube Rüteren	Weiach	ZH	2007	
ZH1252	Alte Oelerdeponie/Munimatt	Wettswil am Albis	ZH	2007	
ZH0995	Kiesgrube Rosengarten	Wila	ZH	2001	
ZH1004	Totentäli	Winterthur	ZH	2001	
ZH1013	Weiher Häsental	Winterthur	ZH	2001	
ZH1015	Weiertal	Winterthur	ZH	2001	
ZH1017	Lehmgrube Dättnau	Winterthur	ZH	2001	
ZH1211	Sandlochgrube Chomberg	Winterthur	ZH	2001	
ZH1212	Amphibienbiotope Allmend III	Zürich	ZH	2001	

== See also ==
- Nature parks in Switzerland
