= Lake Coffy =

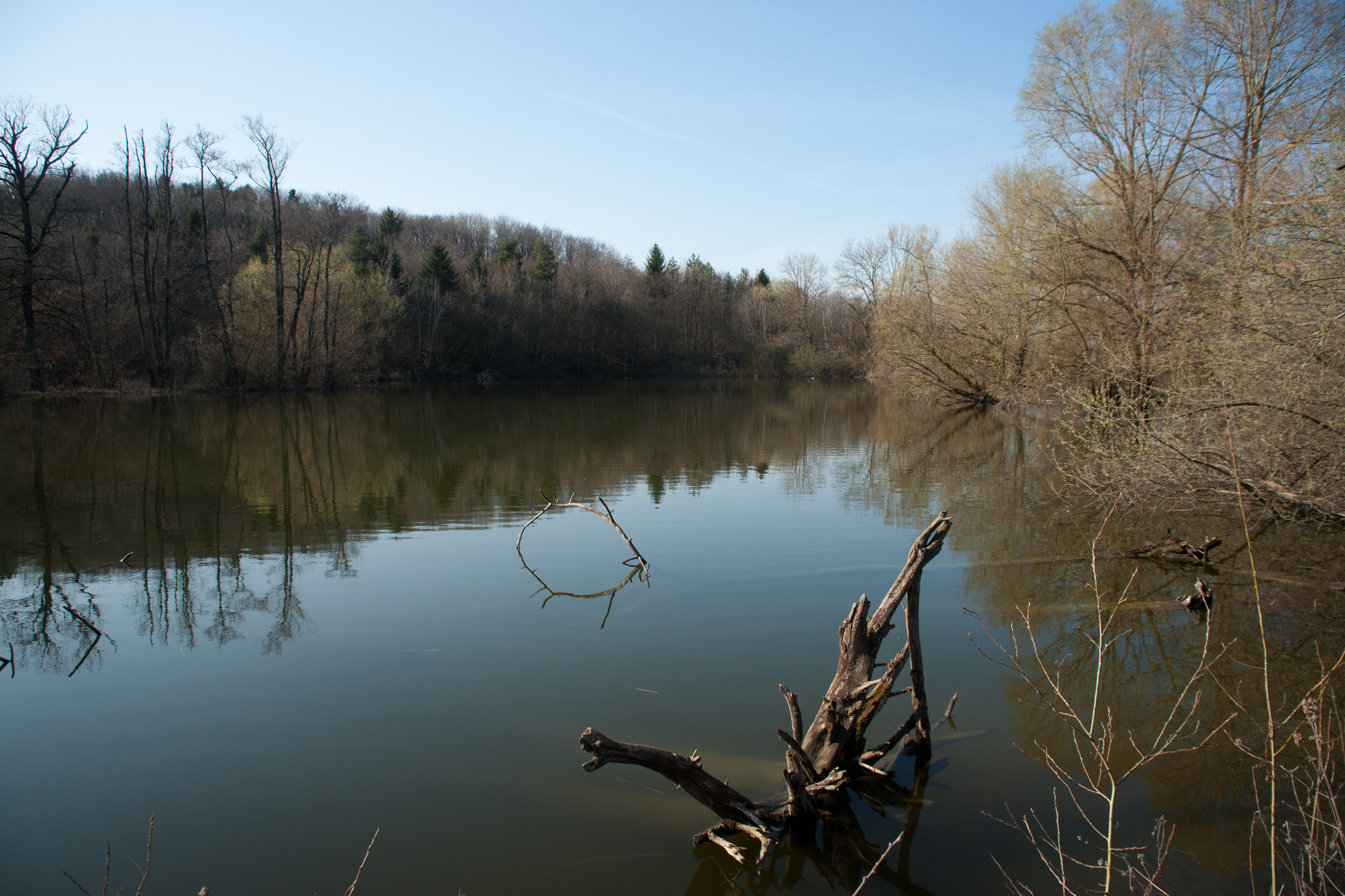

- Location within Canton of Vaud Location within Switzerland Location within Alps
- Interactive map of Lake Coffy
- Location: Vaud
- Coordinates: 46°36′56″N 6°35′15″E
- Type: artificial lake
- Basin countries: Switzerland
- Max. length: 140 m (460 ft)
- Max. width: 95 m (312 ft)
- Surface area: 1.2 ha (3.0 acres)
- Max. depth: 3 m (9.8 ft)
- Surface elevation: 595 m (1,952 ft)
- Islands: 1

Lake Coffy is a lake between Bettens and Boussens in the canton of Vaud, Switzerland. Its surface area is 1.2 ha. The artificial lake was created in 1972. The site is listed in the Federal Inventory of Amphibian Spawning Areas.

== See also ==
- 1972 in the environment
