= Ägelsee =

Lake in the municipality of Zeiningen, Canton of Aargau, Switzerland

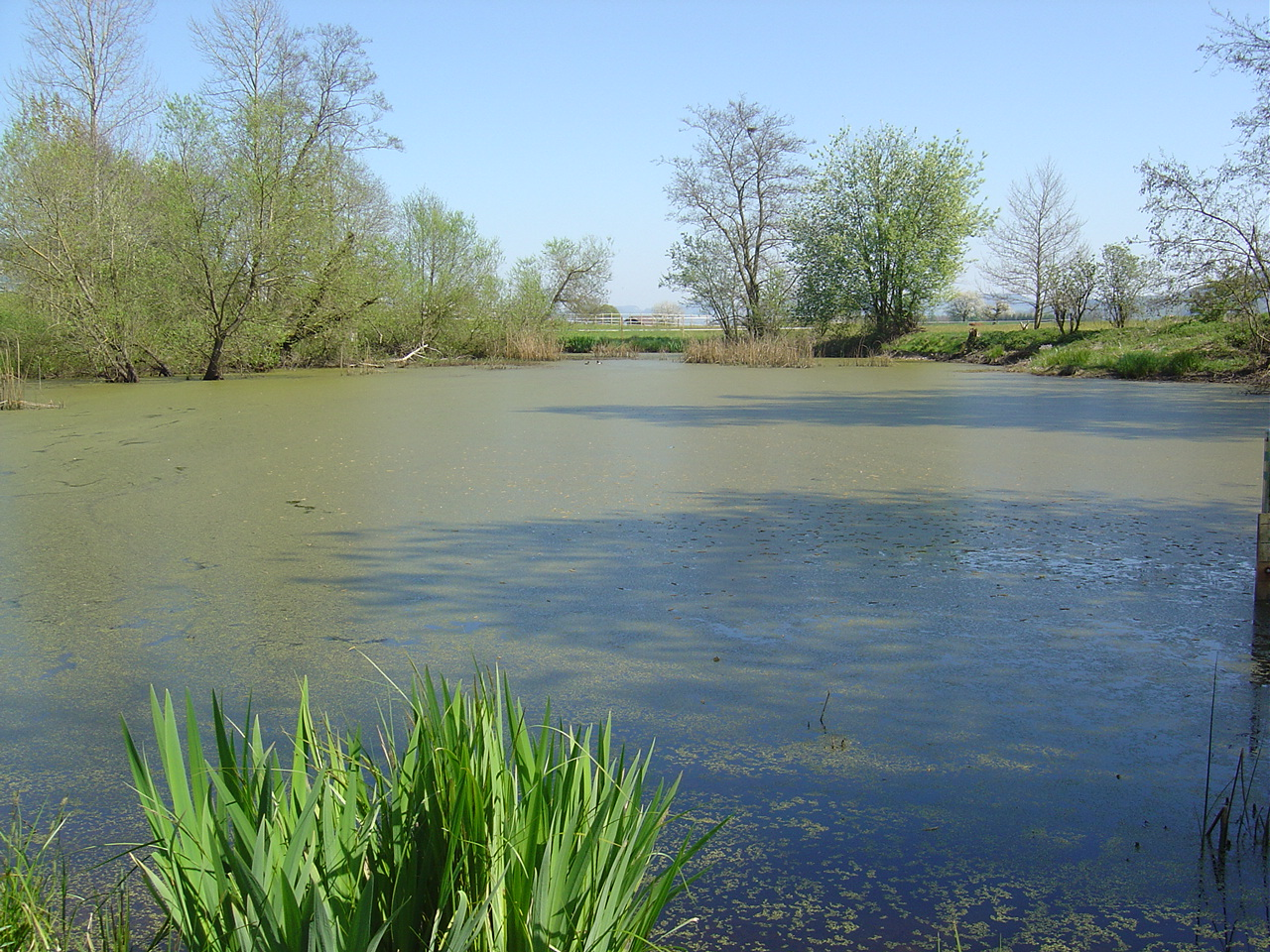

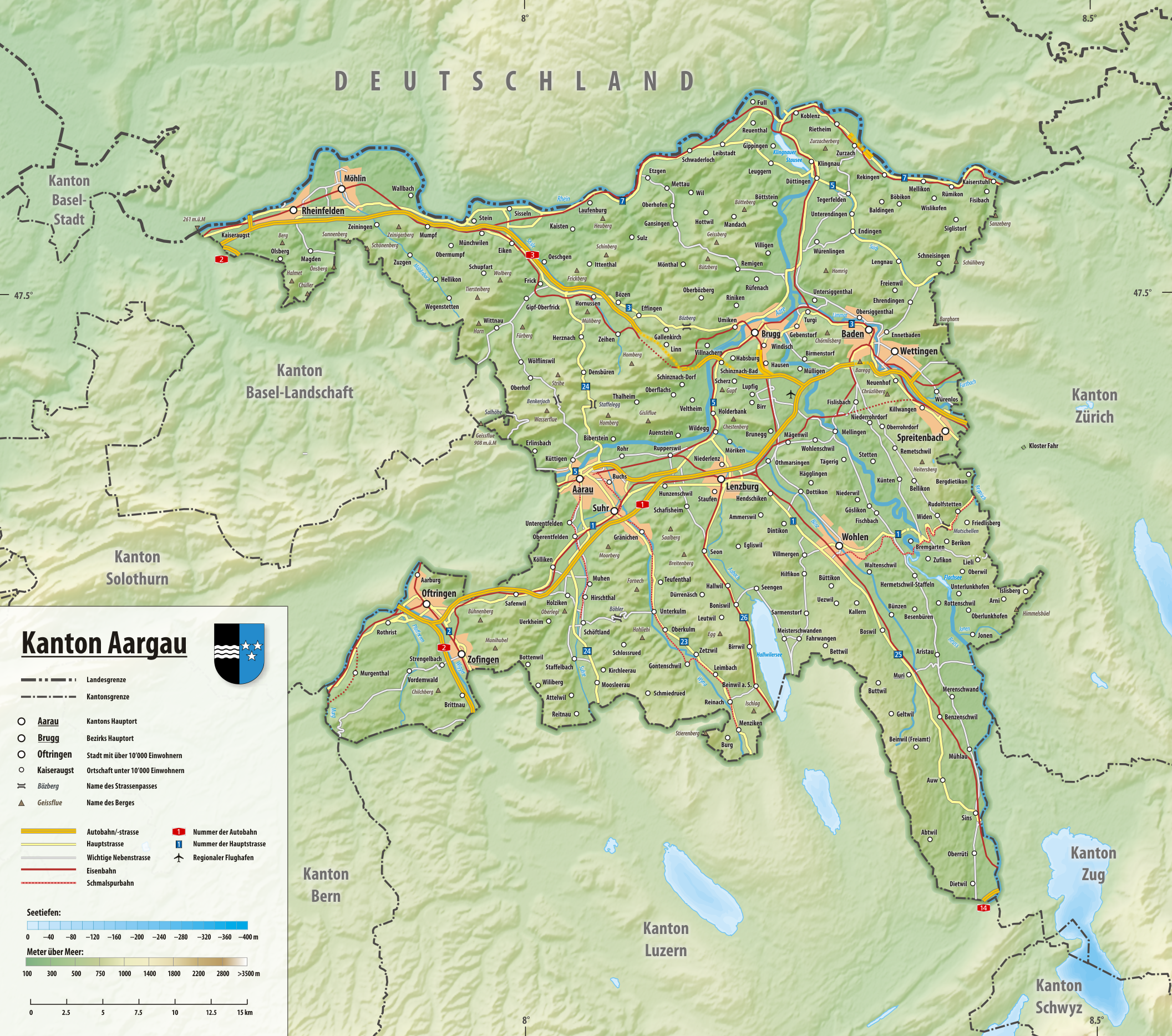
- Location within Canton of Aargau Location within Switzerland Location within Alps
- Interactive map of Ägelsee
- Location: Zeiningen, Aargau
- Coordinates: 47.566111°N 7.879167°E
- Basin countries: Switzerland
- Surface elevation: 339 m (1,112 ft)

Ägelsee (or Egelsee) is a small lake in the municipality of Zeiningen, Canton of Aargau, Switzerland. The 7500 m^{2} nature preserve is an amphibian spawning area of national importance.
