= Morgetshofsee =

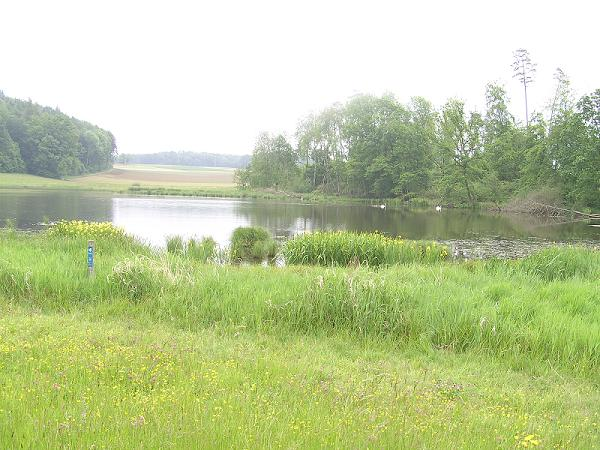

- Location within Canton of Schaffhausen Location within Switzerland Location within Alps
- Interactive map of Morgetshofsee
- Location: Thayngen, Schaffhausen
- Coordinates: 47°43′44″N 8°42′03″E
- Type: kettle lake
- Basin countries: Switzerland

Morgetshofsee is a kettle lake at Thayngen in the canton of Schaffhausen, Switzerland. The lake and its surroundings are listed in the Federal Inventory of Amphibian Spawning Areas as a site of national importance.

The following species were observed at Morgetshofsee: Common Frog (Rana temporaria), Edible Frog, Agile Frog (Rana dalmatina), European tree frog (Hyla arborea), Alpine Newt (Triturus alpestris), Great Crested Newt (Triturus cristatus), Smooth Newt (Triturus vulgaris) and Common Toad (Bufo bufo).
