= Lac du Mont d'Orge =

Lake in Valais, Switzerland

- Location within Canton of Valais Location within Switzerland Location within Alps
- Interactive map of Lac du Mont d'Orge
- Location: Sion, Valais
- Coordinates: 46°13′59″N 7°20′13″E
- Basin countries: Switzerland
- Surface elevation: 643 m (2,110 ft)

Lac du Mont d'Orge (or Lac de Montorge) is a small lake above Sion, Valais, Switzerland.
