= Fischbach-Göslikon =

- Municipality
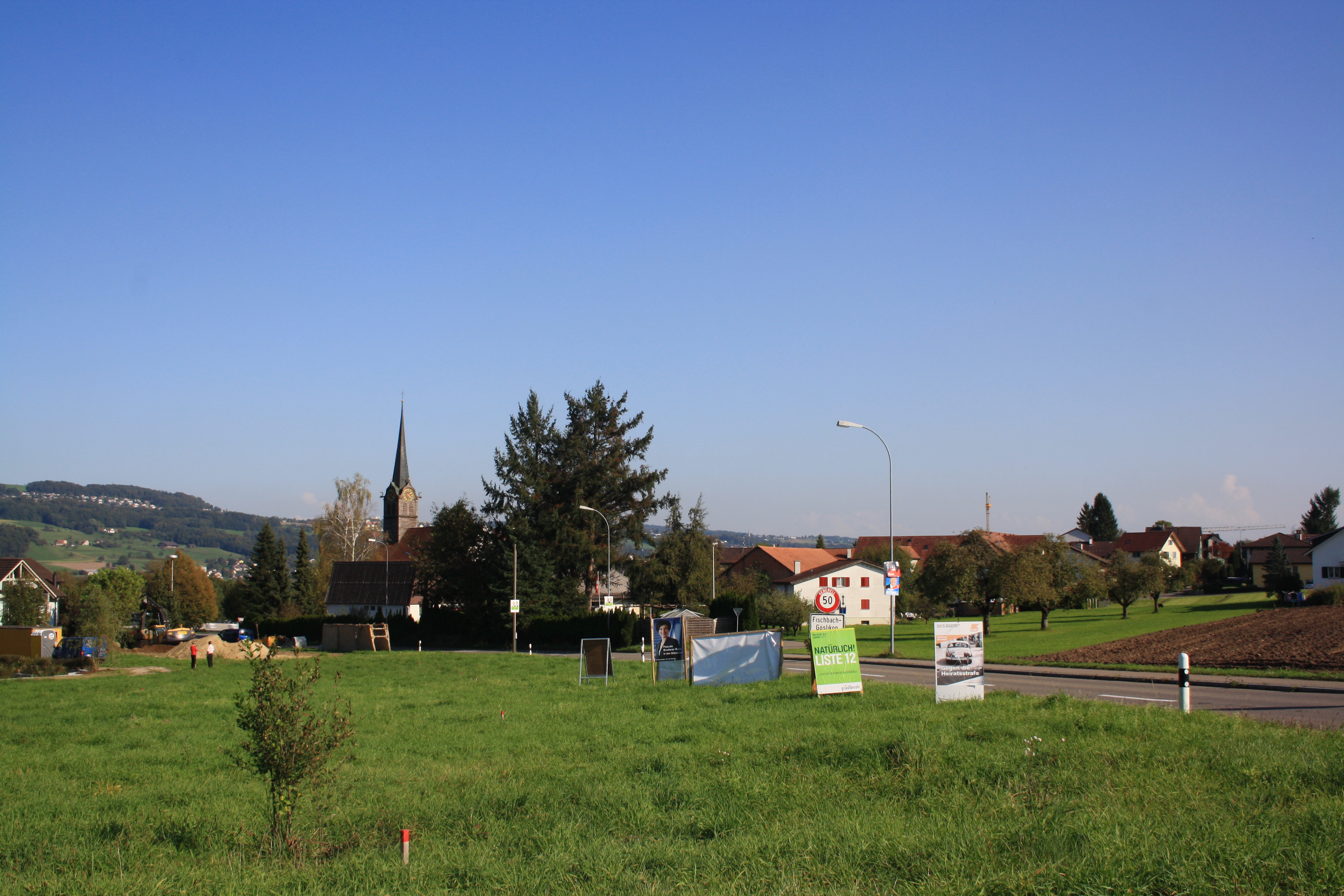

- Flag Coat of arms
- Location of Fischbach-Göslikon
- Location within Switzerland Location within Canton of Aargau
- Coordinates: 47°22′N 8°18′E
- Country: Switzerland
- Canton: Aargau
- District: Bremgarten

Area
  - Total: 3.07 km^{2} (1.19 sq mi)
- Elevation: 390 m (1,280 ft)

Population (December 2020)
  - Total: 1,672
  - Density: 545/km^{2} (1,410/sq mi)
- Time zone: UTC+01:00 (CET)
  - Summer (DST): UTC+02:00 (CEST)
- Postal code: 5525
- SFOS number: 4067
- ISO 3166 code: CH-AG
- Surrounded by: Bremgarten, Eggenwil, Künten, Niederwil, Wohlen
- Website: www.fischbach-goeslikon.ch

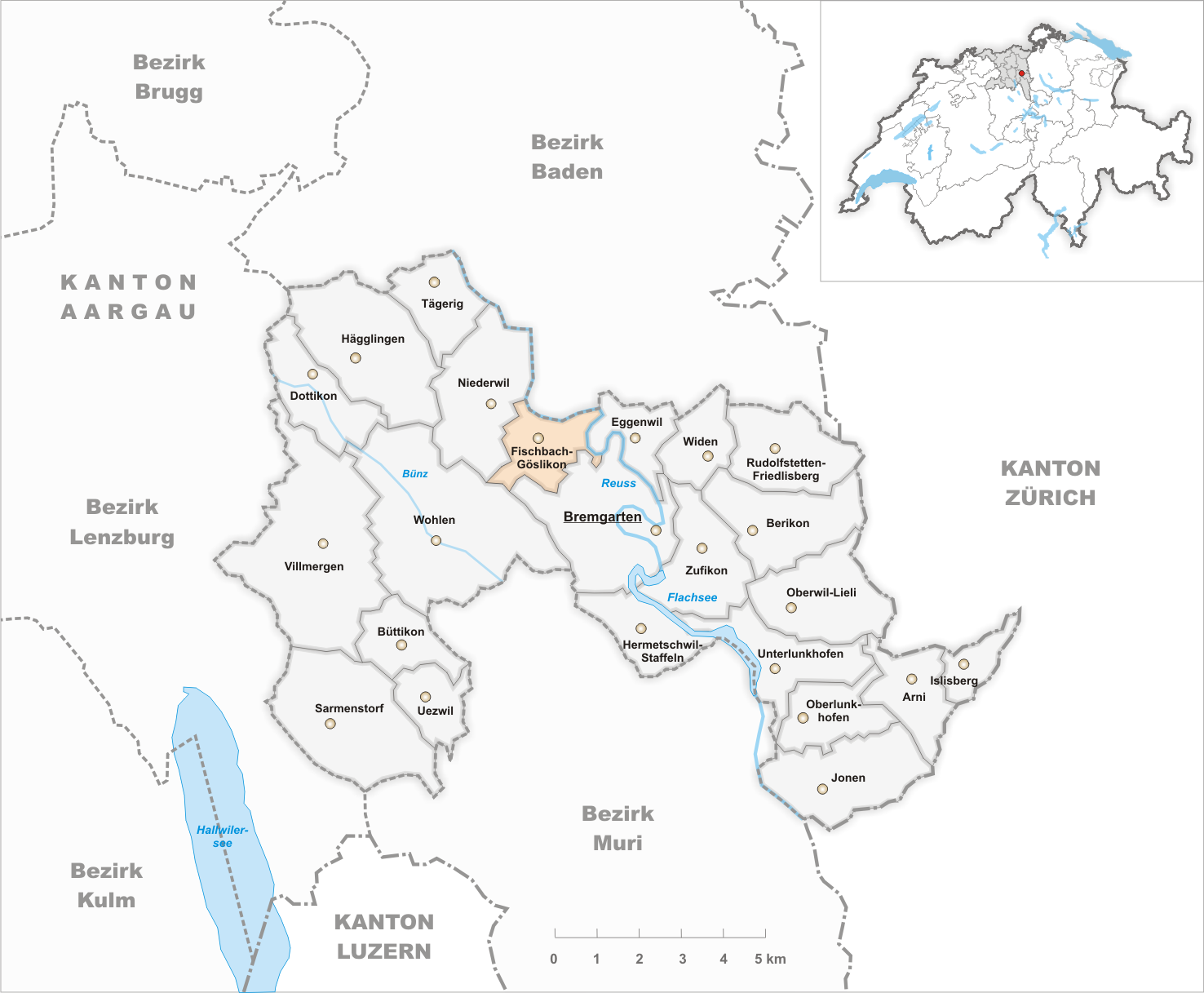
Fischbach-Göslikon

Fischbach-Göslikon is a municipality in the district of Bremgarten in the canton of Aargau in Switzerland.

Aerial view (1966)

== History ==
While several, individual mesolithic items have been found in the municipality, the first evidence of a settlement are two Hallstatt era graves. The current village was founded in the Middle Ages. The medieval settlements of Fischbach and Göslikon are first mentioned in the first half of the 12th century as Visbach und Fischbach. In 1159 it was mentioned as Cohelinchon, and in 1179 as Cozlinchon. The high and low justice lay with the Habsburgs, and then after 1415 with the Swiss. The monasteries of Hermetschwil and Gnadental as well as citizens and institutions of Bremgarten held property in both villages.

The parish church was consecrated in 1048 and at least from 1159, it was in possession of Muri Abbey. In 1360 it came under the authority of the Spital Baden. Between 1529 and 1531 the Protestant Reformation entered Fischbach-Göslikon, though today more of the population remains Roman Catholic. In 1671–72, a new church was built and in 1757-60 it was rebuilt in the Rococo style. In 1709 a new chapel was built next to the church.

In 1798 Fischbach and Göslikon were combined, though the Ortsbürger communities remained separate until 1997.

In the 19th Century a peat processing operation opened in the village. Around the same time, a significant factory for straw plaiting opened. The factory had 71 employees in 1863, and added 12 more by 1885 (at the time the combined villages only had about 500 inhabitants). A gravel plant opened along the banks of the Reuss. The Reuss River Corrections of 1811–18, 1906–15 and 1935–50 changed the landscape and settlement pattern of Fischbach-Göslikon.

== Geography ==
Fischbach-Göslikon has an area, as of 2006, of 3.1 square kilometers (1.2 sq mi). Of this area, 52.3% is used for agricultural purposes, while 19.4% is forested. Of the rest of the land, 16.8% is settled (buildings or roads) and the remainder (11.6%) is non-productive (rivers or lakes).

The municipality is located in the Bremgarten district, on the left bank of the Reuss river and along the Bremgarten-Mellingen road. It consists of the villages of Fischbach and Göslikon which merged in 1798 and since then have physically grown together.

== Coat of arms ==
The blazon of the municipal coat of arms is Gules a Fish embowed Argent. The fish (German: fisch) makes this an example of canting.

== Demographics ==
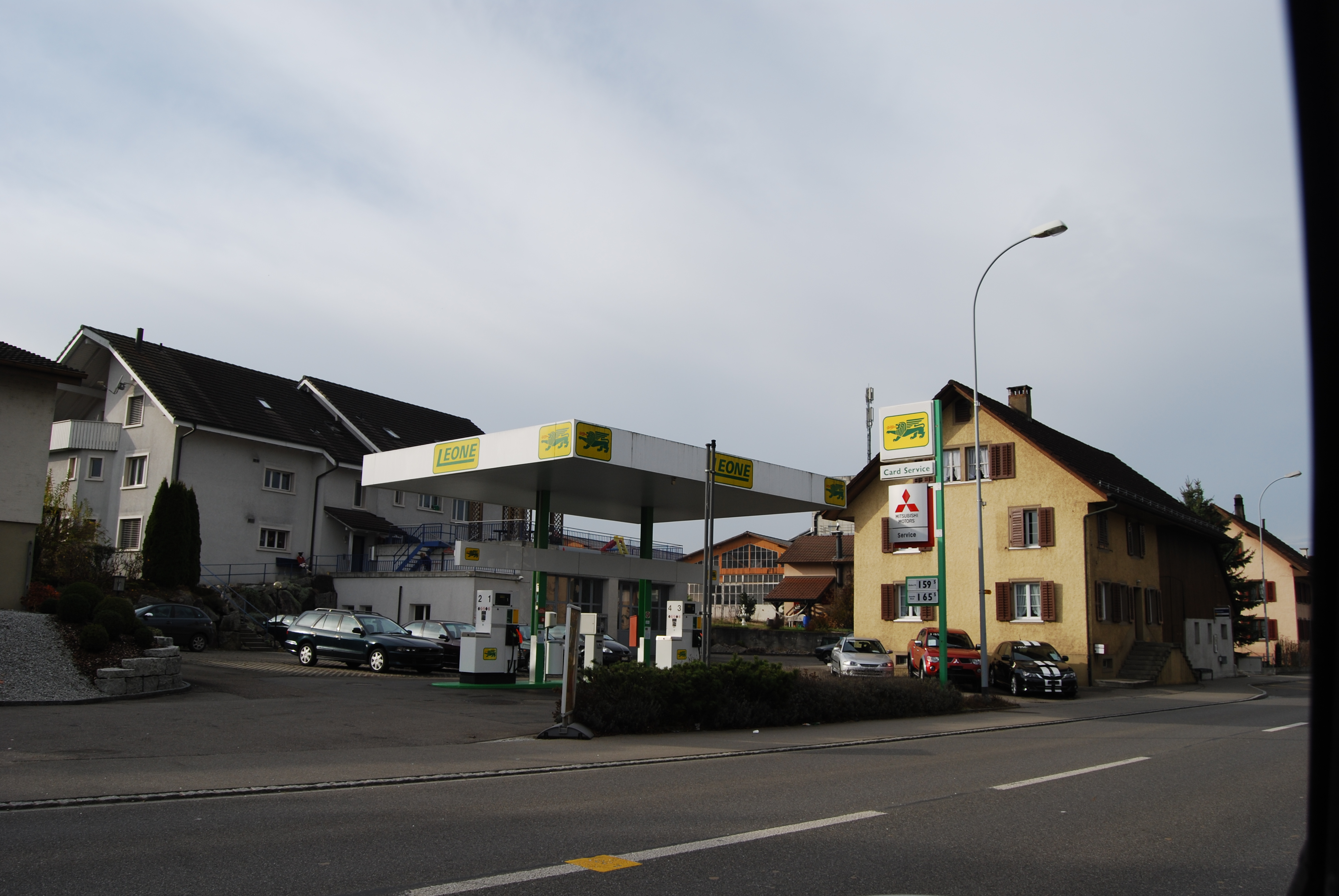
Fischbach-Göslikon

Fischbach-Göslikon has a population (as of 31 December 2020) of 1,672. As of 2008, 7.8% of the population was made up of foreign nationals. Over the last 10 years the population has grown at a rate of 19.1%. Most of the population (as of 2000) speaks German (96.4%), with Italian being second most common ( 1.0%) and French being third ( 0.4%).

The age distribution, as of 2008, in Fischbach-Göslikon is; 170 children or 12.2% of the population are between 0 and 9 years old and 187 teenagers or 13.5% are between 10 and 19. Of the adult population, 175 people or 12.6% of the population are between 20 and 29 years old. 191 people or 13.8% are between 30 and 39, 257 people or 18.5% are between 40 and 49, and 205 people or 14.8% are between 50 and 59. The senior population distribution is 122 people or 8.8% of the population are between 60 and 69 years old, 52 people or 3.7% are between 70 and 79, there are 25 people or 1.8% who are between 80 and 89, and there are 5 people or 0.4% who are 90 and older.

As of 2000 the average number of residents per living room was 0.59 which is about equal to the cantonal average of 0.57 per room. In this case, a room is defined as space of a housing unit of at least 4 m^{2} (43 sq ft) as normal bedrooms, dining rooms, living rooms, kitchens and habitable cellars and attics. About 68.3% of the total households were owner occupied, or in other words did not pay rent (though they may have a mortgage or a rent-to-own agreement). As of 2000, there were 26 homes with 1 or 2 persons in the household, 223 homes with 3 or 4 persons in the household, and 214 homes with 5 or more persons in the household. The average number of people per household was 2.61 individuals. In 2008 there were 297 single family homes (or 54.1% of the total) out of a total of 549 homes and apartments. There were a total of 2 empty apartments for a 0.4% vacancy rate. As of 2007, the construction rate of new housing units was 2.2 new units per 1000 residents.

In the 2007 federal election the most popular party was the SVP which received 47.8% of the vote. The next three most popular parties were the CVP (14%), the FDP (11.6%) and the SP (9.3%).

The entire Swiss population is generally well educated. In Fischbach-Göslikon about 80.6% of the population (between age 25–64) have completed either non-mandatory upper secondary education or additional higher education (either university or a Fachhochschule). Of the school age population (in the 2008/2009 school year), there are 144 students attending primary school in the municipality.

The historical population is given in the following table:

Historical population
Year	Pop.	±%
1798	341	—
1850	569	+66.9%
1900	392	−31.1%
1920	331	−15.6%
1950	389	+17.5%
1980	633	+62.7%
1990	963	+52.1%
2000	1,254	+30.2%

== Heritage sites of national significance ==
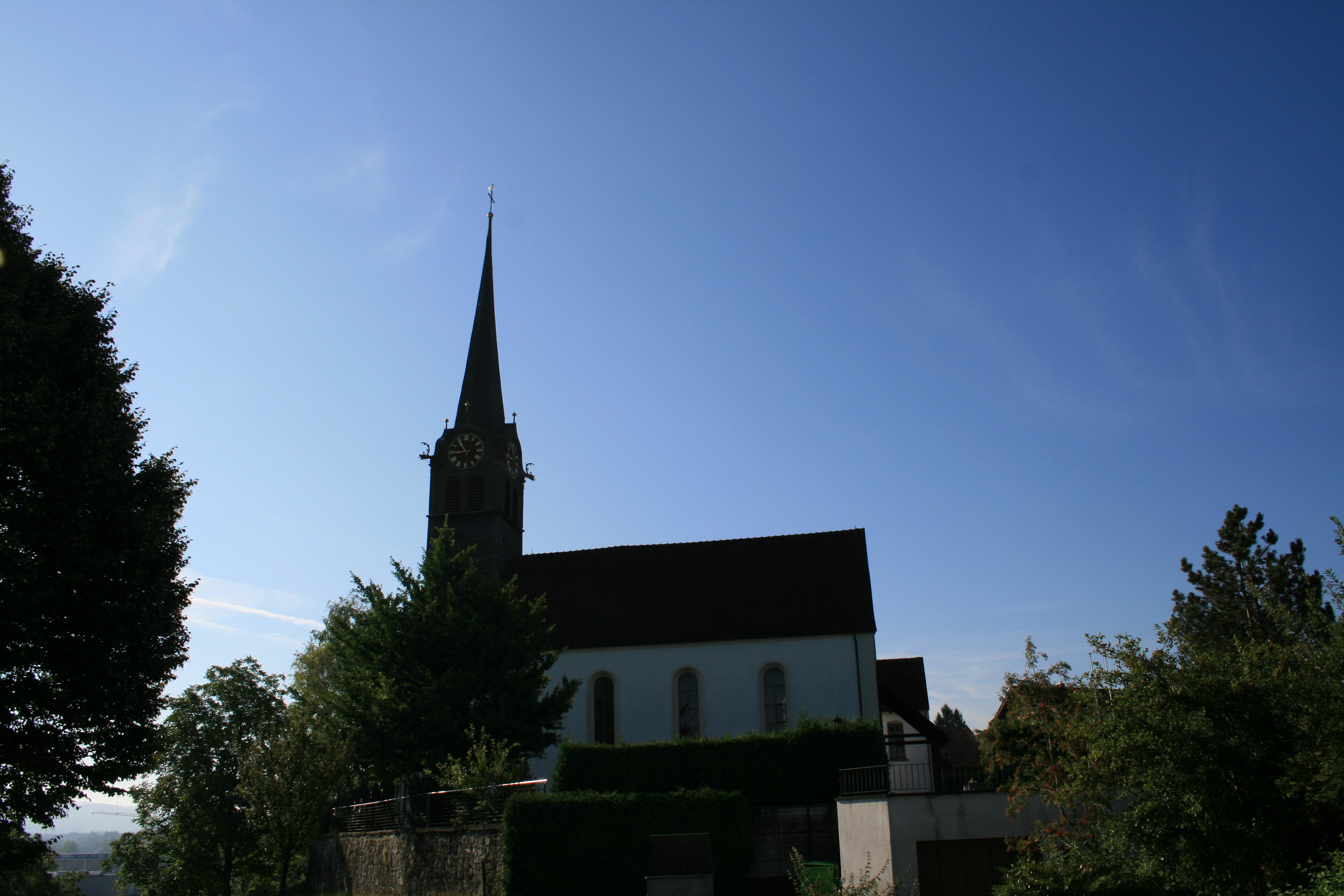
Parish Church of Fischbach-Göslikon

The Roman Catholic parish church of the Assumption of Mary (German: Maria Himmelfahrt) is listed as a Swiss heritage site of national significance.

== Economy ==
As of 2007, Fischbach-Göslikon had an unemployment rate of 1.91%. As of 2005, there were 36 people employed in the primary economic sector and about 13 businesses involved in this sector. 185 people are employed in the secondary sector and there are 13 businesses in this sector. 93 people are employed in the tertiary sector, with 41 businesses in this sector.

As of 2000 there was a total of 706 workers who lived in the municipality. Of these, 587 or about 83.1% of the residents worked outside Fischbach-Göslikon while 209 people commuted into the municipality for work. There were a total of 328 jobs (of at least 6 hours per week) in the municipality. Of the working population, 9.4% used public transportation to get to work, and 65.7% used a private car.

== Religion ==
From the 2000 census, 709 or 56.5% were Roman Catholic, while 352 or 28.1% belonged to the Swiss Reformed Church. Of the rest of the population, there were 2 individuals (or about 0.16% of the population) who belonged to the Christian Catholic faith.
