= Niederwil, Aargau =

Niederwil
- Municipality
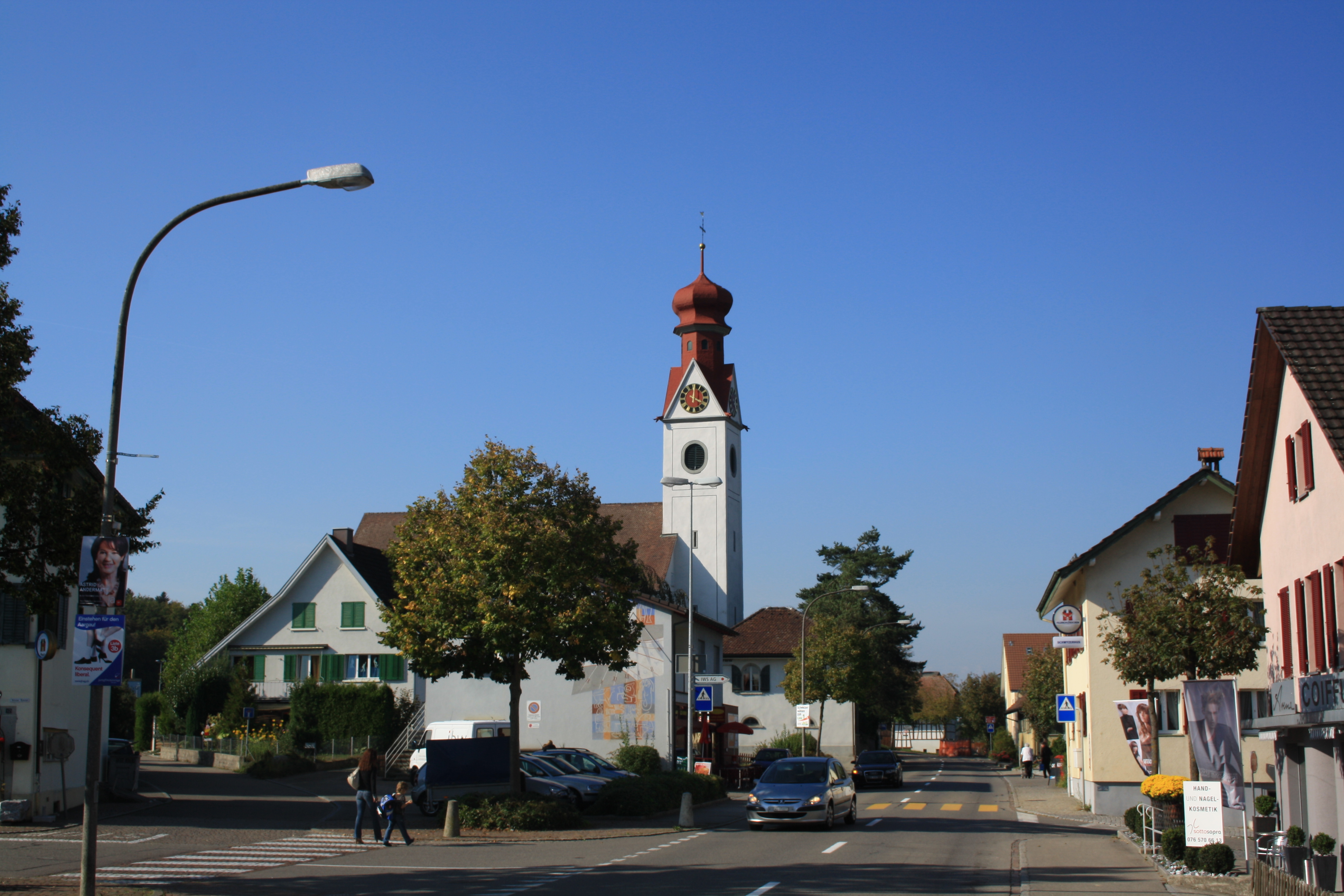

- Flag Coat of arms
- Location of Niederwil
- Location within Switzerland Location within Canton of Aargau
- Coordinates: 47°23′N 8°18′E
- Country: Switzerland
- Canton: Aargau
- District: Bremgarten

Area
  - Total: 6.15 km^{2} (2.37 sq mi)
- Elevation: 405 m (1,329 ft)

Population (December 2020)
  - Total: 2,863
  - Density: 466/km^{2} (1,210/sq mi)
- Time zone: UTC+01:00 (CET)
  - Summer (DST): UTC+02:00 (CEST)
- Postal code: 5524
- SFOS number: 4072
- ISO 3166 code: CH-AG
- Surrounded by: Fischbach-Göslikon, Hägglingen, Künten, Stetten, Tägerig, Wohlen
- Website: www.niederwil.ch

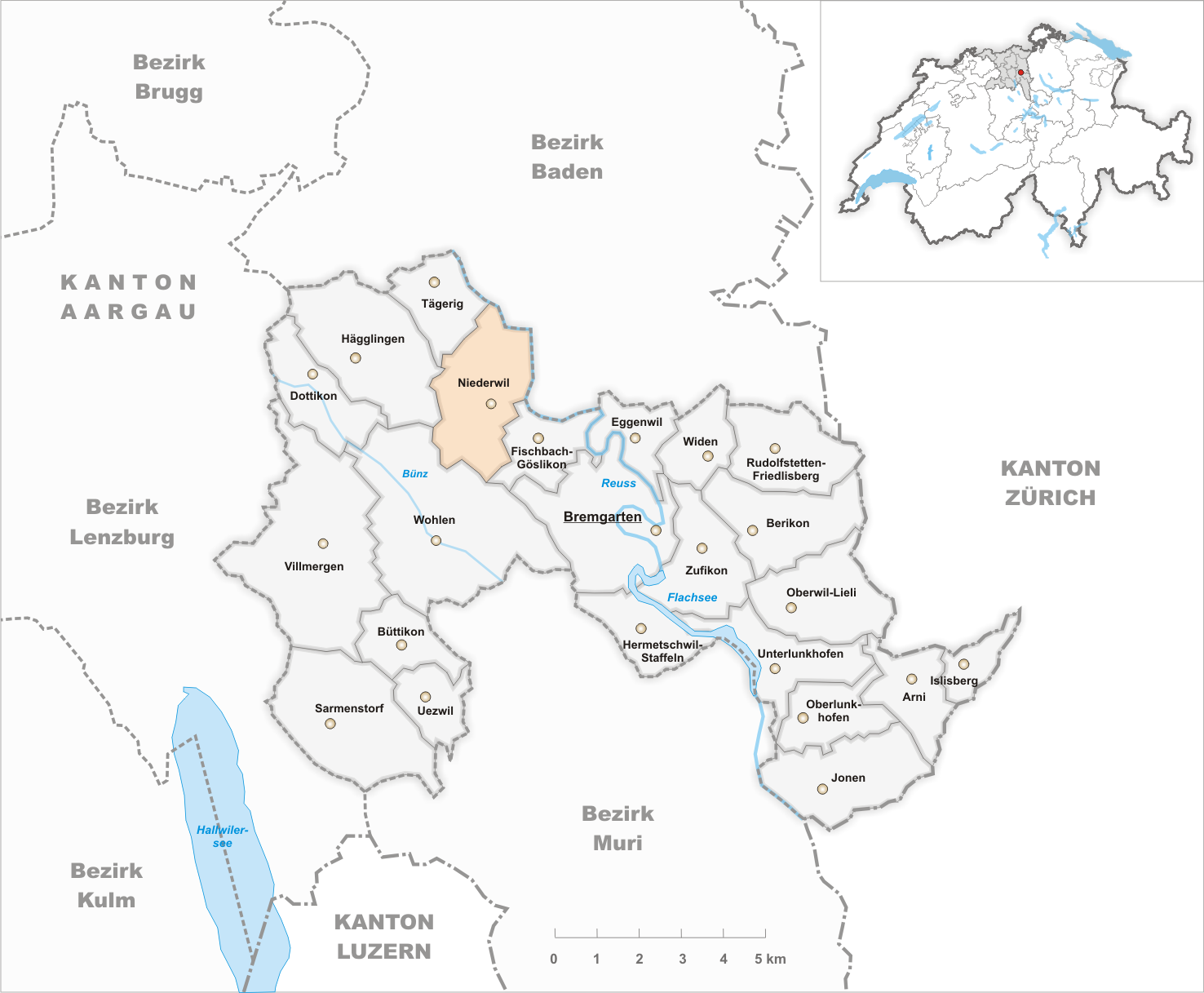
Niederwil

Niederwil is a municipality in the district of Bremgarten in the canton of Aargau in Switzerland.

== History ==
The first traces of human settlement near Niederwil are several scattered neolithic stones axes. During the Roman era, there was a small settlement. Near the church is the ruins of a Roman era wall, and there was a Roman treasury at what is now Riedmatte. An iron spearhead from the 7th Century was discovered in the municipality, but all details of the discovery have been lost.

The village of Niederwil is first mentioned in 924 as Wilare. The rights to high justice were held throughout the High and Late Middle Ages by the Counts of Lenzburg. Following their extinction, the rights were held by the House of Habsburg, and after the 1415 conquest of Aargau, they were held by the Old Swiss Confederation. The rights to low justice were held by Schänis Abbey in Gaster.

== Geography ==
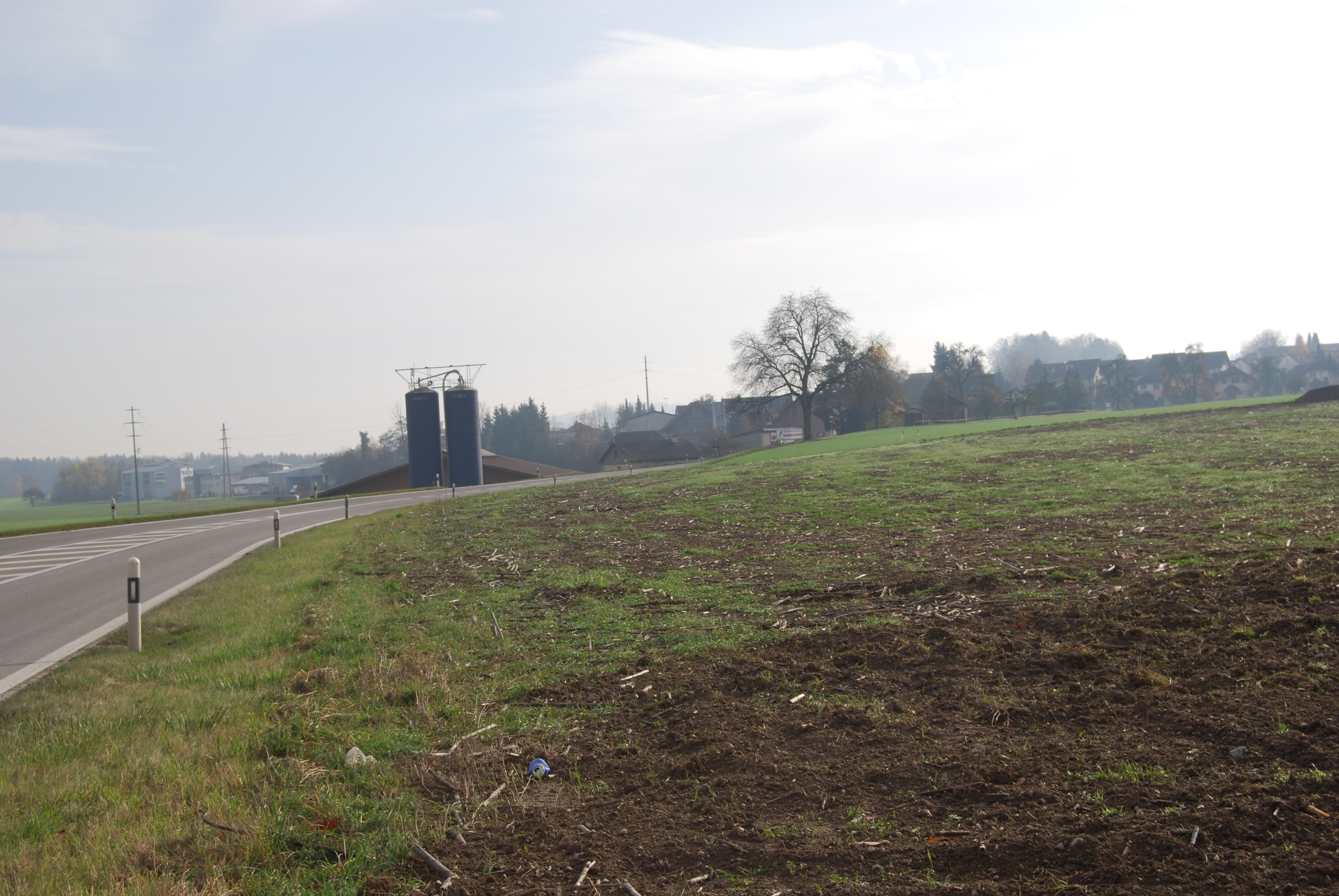
Nesselnbach

Aerial view (1970)

Niederwil has an area, as of 2006, of 6.1 square kilometers (2.4 sq mi). Of this area, 53% is used for agricultural purposes, while 30.4% is forested. Of the rest of the land, 14.1% is settled (buildings or roads) and the remainder (2.5%) is non-productive (rivers or lakes).

The municipality is located in the Bremgarten district on the left bank of the Reuss river. It consists of the village of Niederwil and since 1901, the village of Nesselnbach and the former Gnadental convent.

== Coat of arms ==
The blazon of the municipal coat of arms is Per fess on a Bar Sable a Barrulet countercompony Gules and Argent, chief Gules two Bends Argent and base Vert a Barrulet wavy Argent.

== Demographics ==
Niederwil has a population (as of 31 December 2020) of 2,863. As of 2008, 14.8% of the population was made up of foreign nationals. Over the last 10 years the population has grown at a rate of 9.8%. Most of the population (as of 2000) speaks German (92.7%), with Albanian being second most common ( 2.0%) and Italian being third ( 1.9%).

The age distribution, as of 2008, in Niederwil is; 254 children or 10.6% of the population are between 0 and 9 years old and 381 teenagers or 15.9% are between 10 and 19. Of the adult population, 284 people or 11.9% of the population are between 20 and 29 years old. 280 people or 11.7% are between 30 and 39, 458 people or 19.1% are between 40 and 49, and 341 people or 14.2% are between 50 and 59. The senior population distribution is 224 people or 9.4% of the population are between 60 and 69 years old, 113 people or 4.7% are between 70 and 79, there are 50 people or 2.1% who are between 80 and 89, and there are 9 people or 0.4% who are 90 and older.

As of 2000 the average number of residents per living room was 0.61 which is about equal to the cantonal average of 0.57 per room. In this case, a room is defined as space of a housing unit of at least 4 m^{2} (43 sq ft) as normal bedrooms, dining rooms, living rooms, kitchens and habitable cellars and attics. About 59.7% of the total households were owner occupied, or in other words did not pay rent (though they may have a mortgage or a rent-to-own agreement). As of 2000, there were 90 homes with 1 or 2 persons in the household, 288 homes with 3 or 4 persons in the household, and 403 homes with 5 or more persons in the household. The average number of people per household was 2.72 individuals. In 2008 there were 550 single family homes (or 56.4% of the total) out of a total of 976 homes and apartments. There was a total of 1 empty apartment for a 0.1% vacancy rate. As of 2007, the construction rate of new housing units was 8.1 new units per 1000 residents.

In the 2007 federal election the most popular party was the SVP which received 41.3% of the vote. The next three most popular parties were the CVP (18.6%), the SP (12.7%) and the FDP (12%).

In Niederwil about 77.2% of the population (between age 25-64) have completed either non-mandatory upper secondary education or additional higher education (either university or a Fachhochschule). Of the school age population (in the 2008/2009 school year), there are 197 students attending primary school, there are 131 students attending secondary school in the municipality.

The historical population is given in the following table:

Historical population
| Year | Pop. | ±% |
|---|---|---|
| 1837 | 617 | — |
| 1850 | 689 | +11.7% |
| 1888 | 484 | −29.8% |
| 1900 | 500 | +3.3% |
| 1920 | 808 | +61.6% |
| 1950 | 1,102 | +36.4% |
| 2000 | 2,471 | +124.2% |

== Heritage sites of national significance ==
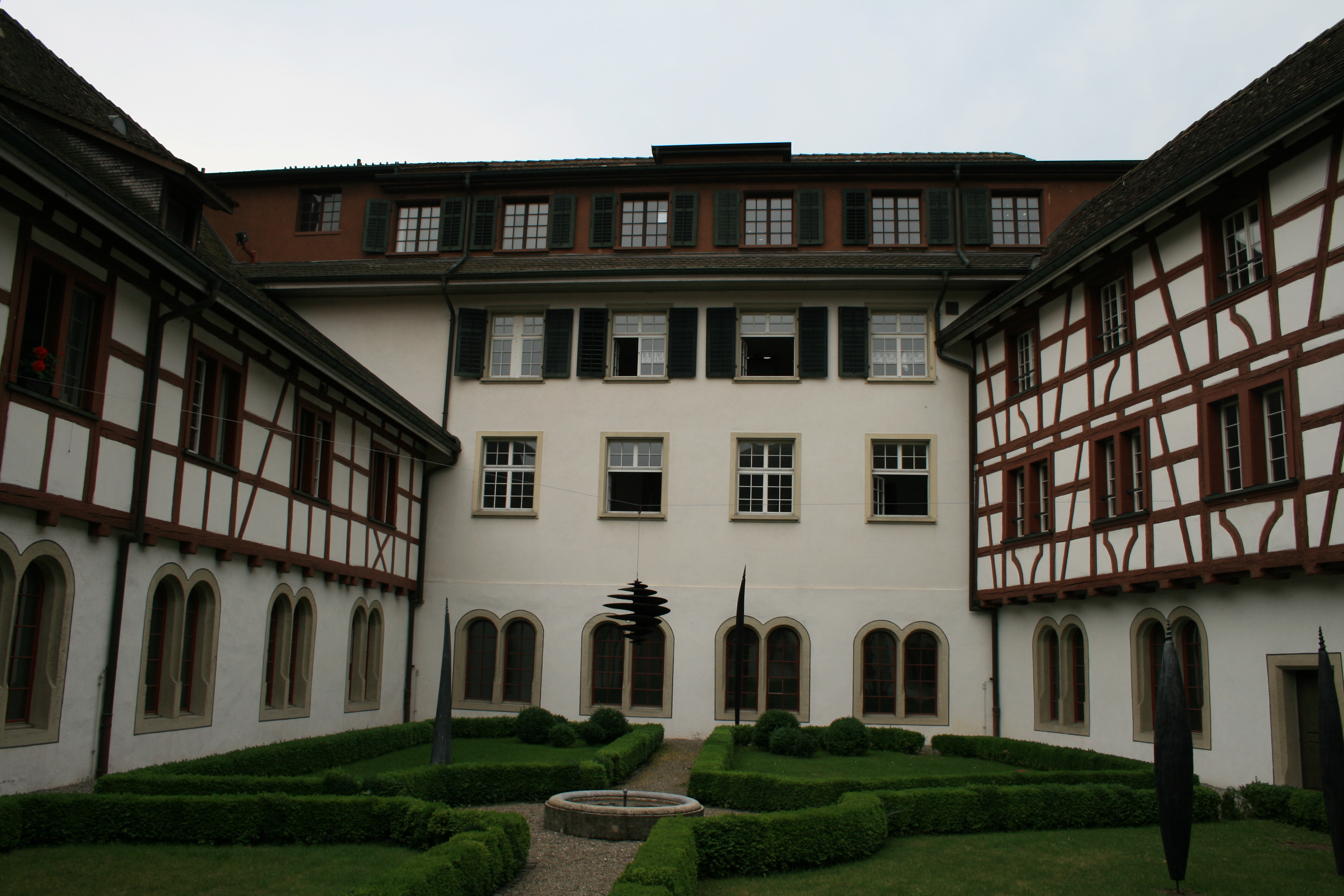
Courtyard of the former Cistercian convent of Gnadenthal

The former Cistercian convent of Gnadenthal as well as the Gnadenthalerstrasse are listed as Swiss heritage sites of national significance.

== Economy ==
As of 2007, Niederwil had an unemployment rate of 1.93%. As of 2005, there were 86 people employed in the primary economic sector and about 21 businesses involved in this sector. 230 people are employed in the secondary sector and there are 21 businesses in this sector. 554 people are employed in the tertiary sector, with 59 businesses in this sector.

As of 2000 there was a total of 2,921 workers who lived in the municipality. Of these, 1,978 or about 67.7% of the residents worked outside Bremgarten while 1,915 people commuted into the municipality for work. There were a total of 2,858 jobs (of at least 6 hours per week) in the municipality. Of the working population, 8.7% used public transportation to get to work, and 60.8% used a private car.

== Religion ==
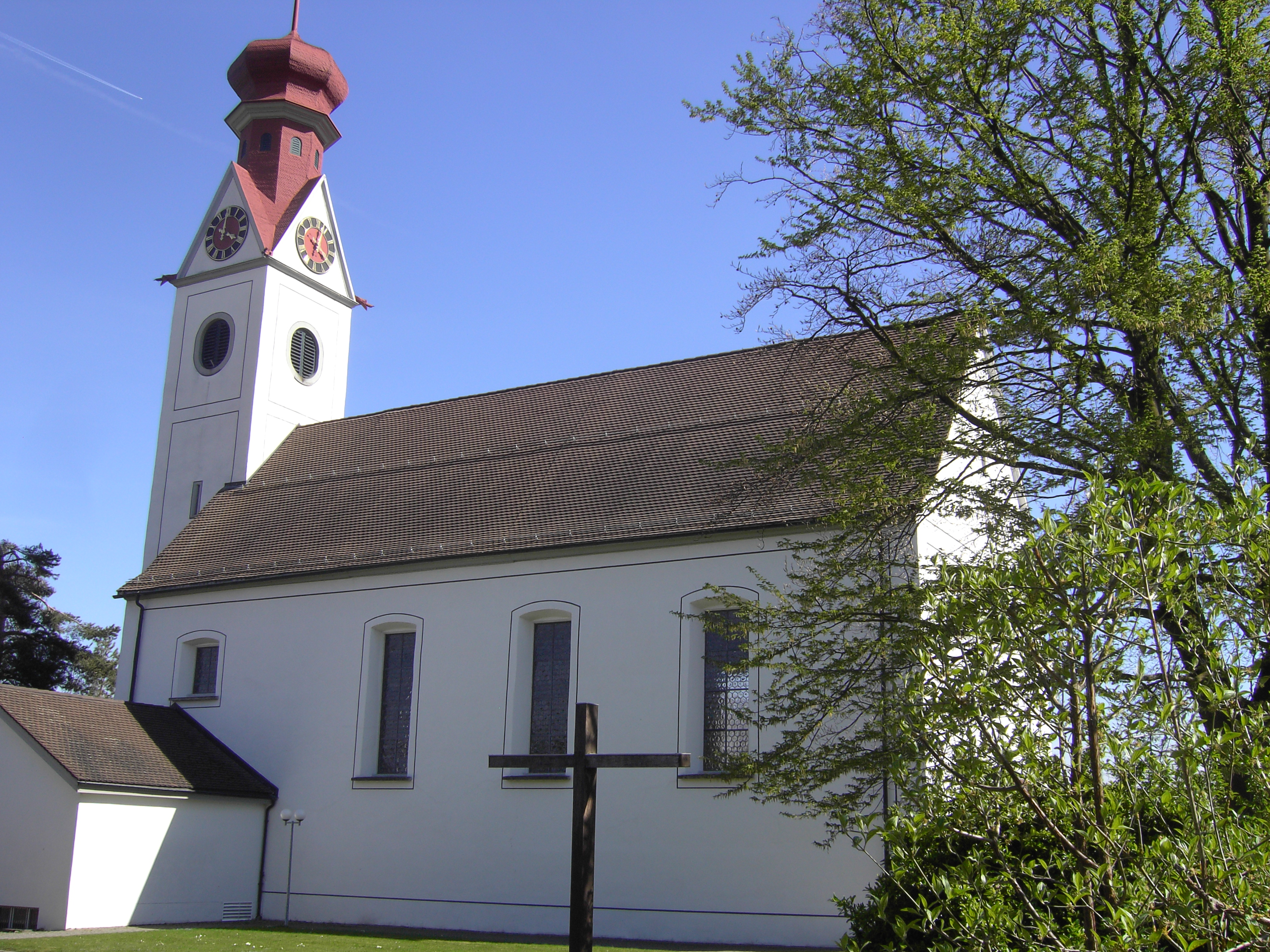
Roman Catholic Church

From the 2000 census, 1,479 or 59.9% were Roman Catholic, while 662 or 26.8% belonged to the Swiss Reformed Church. Of the rest of the population, there were 5 individuals (or about 0.20% of the population) who belonged to the Christian Catholic faith.
