= Coglio =

Village and former municipality in Switzerland

Coordinates: 46°16′7.43″N 8°41′4.93″E

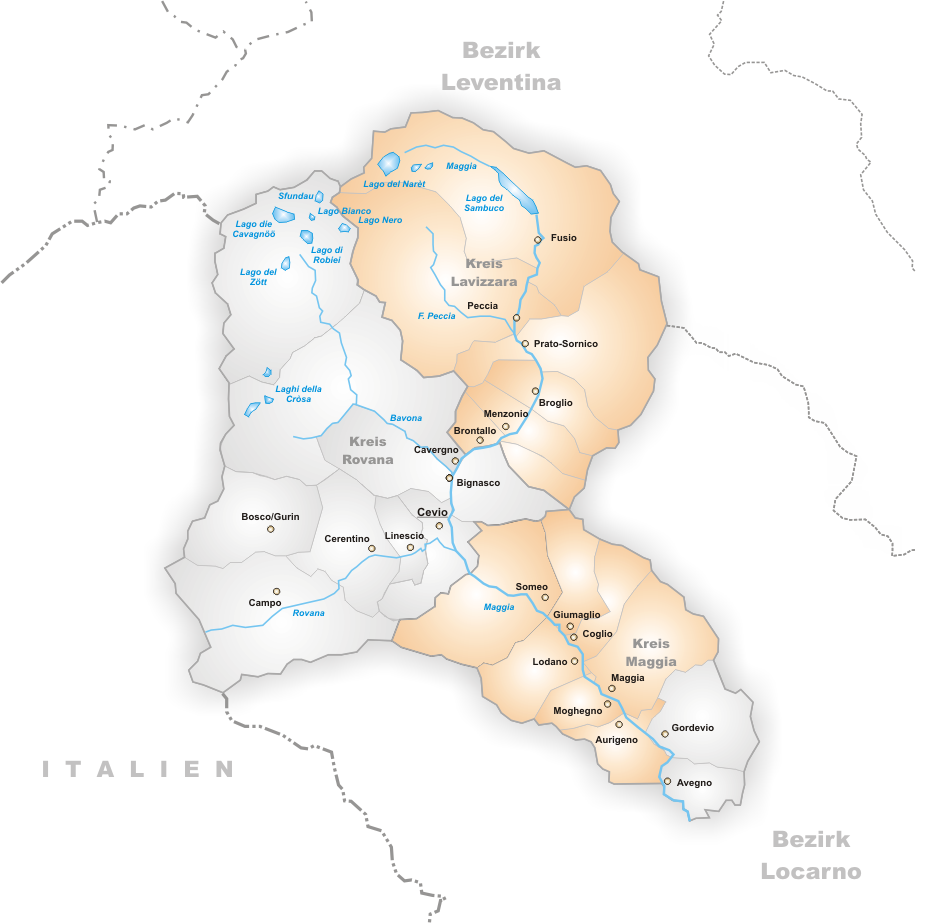
2003 map with Coglio.

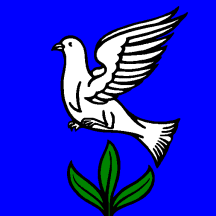
Flag of Coglio.

Coat of arms of Coglio.

Coglio is a village and former municipality in the district of Vallemaggia in the canton of Ticino, Switzerland.

It was first recorded in 1237 as Cono.

The municipality had 100 inhabitants in 1591, which went up and down to 122 in 1719, 94 in 1801, 195 in 1850, 135 in 1900 and 73 in 1950. It then increased somewhat to 96 in 2000 and 99 in 2003. The municipality had an area of 9.55 km^{2}.

In 2004 the municipality was incorporated into the larger, neighboring municipality Maggia.
