= Aristau =

- Municipality
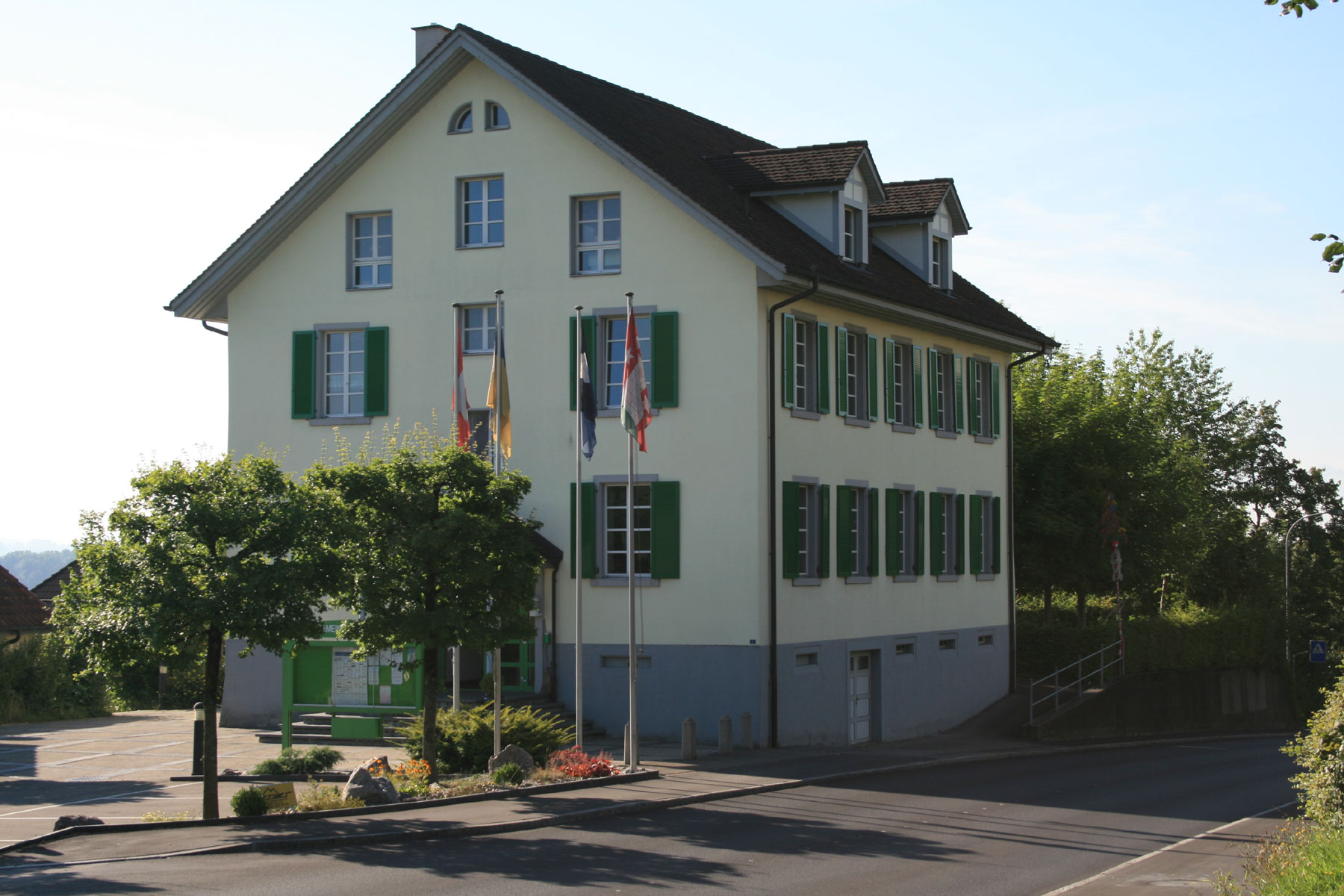

- Flag Coat of arms
- Location of Aristau
- Location within Switzerland Location within Canton of Aargau
- Coordinates: 47°17′N 8°22′E
- Country: Switzerland
- Canton: Aargau
- District: Muri

Area
  - Total: 8.64 km^{2} (3.34 sq mi)
- Elevation: 401 m (1,316 ft)

Population (December 2020)
  - Total: 1,512
  - Density: 175/km^{2} (453/sq mi)
- Time zone: UTC+01:00 (CET)
  - Summer (DST): UTC+02:00 (CEST)
- Postal code: 5628
- SFOS number: 4222
- ISO 3166 code: CH-AG
- Surrounded by: Besenbüren, Boswil, Jonen, Merenschwand, Muri, Ottenbach (ZH), Rottenschwil
- Website: www.aristau.ch

Aristau is a municipality in the district of Muri in the canton of Aargau in Switzerland.

== History ==
Aerial view (1950)

The first traces of human settlement around Aristau are scattered La Tène culture artifacts. The modern municipality of Aristau is made up of three separate sections or villages. The three sections that make up the municipality were first mentioned in 1153 as Arnestowo, Althusern and Birchi. It was originally the seat of a vassal of the Lanzburg family. During the Late Middle Ages it was the possession of the lords of Baar and Muri Abbey. After 1285, the Abbey also owned the rights to hold courts and to collect tithes. In 1351 Catherine of Baar sold the rights and property in Aristau to Hartmann Heidegg. After the destruction of his tower in 1386 by troops from Lucerne and Zurich, the orchard at the foot of the tower was sold to the monastery of Hermetschwil. The remaining property was sold to Muri Abbey. The ruins of Werd Castle (of which no records exist) were possibly the home of the Lords of Aristau. In 1750 Aristau introduced a local tax. This tax led, in 1816, to the current community. However, the town councils of the three villages didn't unite until 1912.

Until 1942, Aristau was part of the parish of Muri. With the completion of the Wendelin Church in 1943, Aristau became the center of the newly independent Reusstalpfarrei (Reuss valley parish). This was a long time in coming, the parish had been planned since 1845. The Chapel of St. John the Baptist and the Evangelist in the village center, was first mentioned in 1360/70 as a filial church of the parish church in Muri. The chapel was totally rebuilt in 1521, enlarged in 1734 and renovated in 1972.

== Geography ==
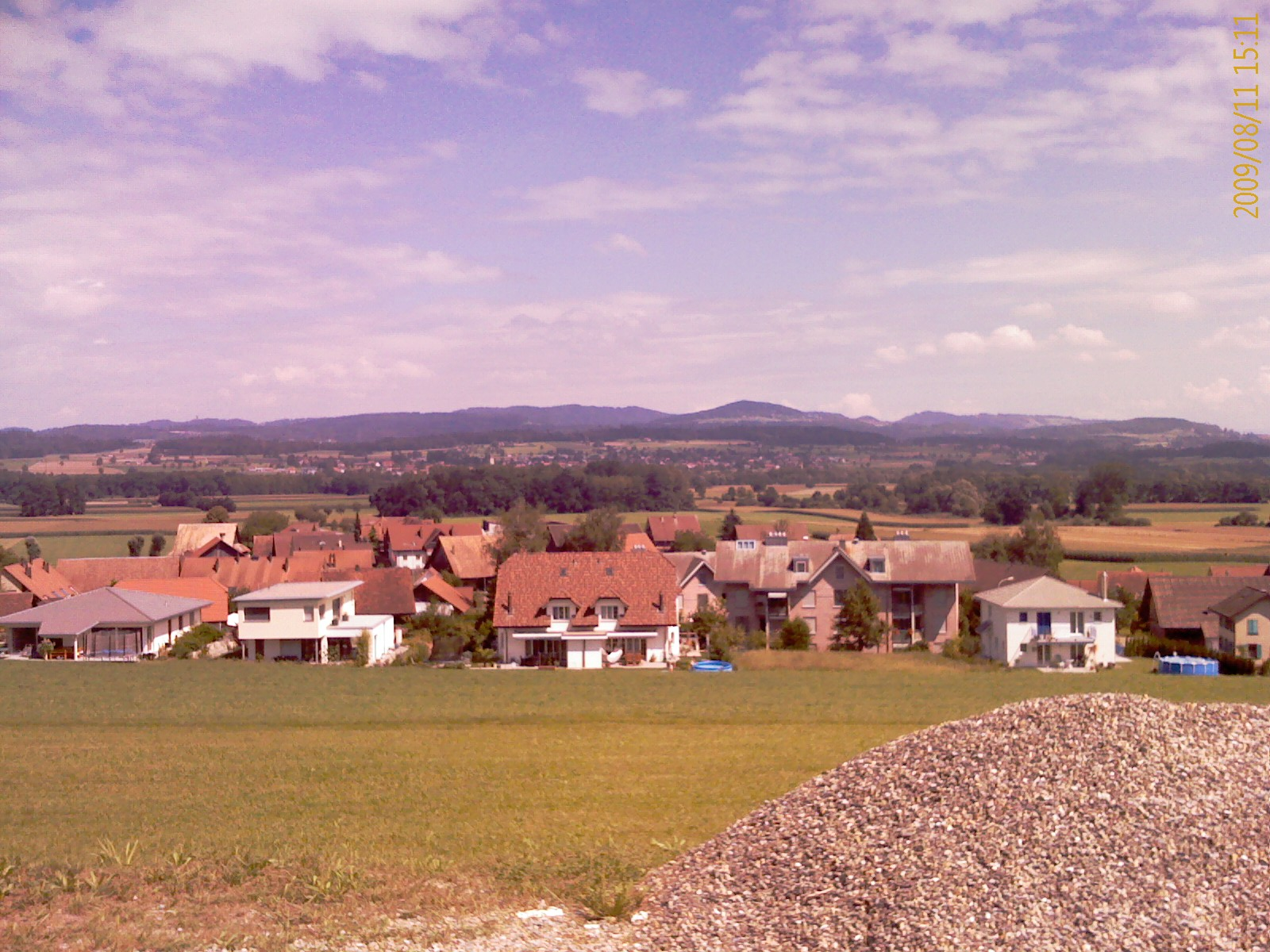
Birri village in Aristau

Aristau has an area, as of 2009, of 8.64 square kilometers (3.34 sq mi). Of this area, 5.98 km^{2} (2.31 sq mi) or 69.2% is used for agricultural purposes, while 1.32 km^{2} (0.51 sq mi) or 15.3% is forested. Of the rest of the land, 0.8 km^{2} (0.31 sq mi) or 9.3% is settled (buildings or roads), 0.25 km^{2} (0.097 sq mi) or 2.9% is either rivers or lakes and 0.36 km^{2} (0.14 sq mi) or 4.2% is unproductive land.

Of the built up area, housing and buildings made up 5.4% and transportation infrastructure made up 3.2%. Out of the forested land, all of the forested land area is covered with heavy forests. Of the agricultural land, 58.6% is used for growing crops and 9.1% is pastures, while 1.5% is used for orchards or vine crops. All the water in the municipality is in rivers and streams. Of the unproductive areas, 4.1% is unproductive vegetation.

The municipality is located in the Muri district, on the eastern slope of the Wagenrain hills above the Reuss river valley. It consists of the villages of Aristau, Birri and Althäusern.

== Coat of arms ==
The blazon of the municipal coat of arms is Gules a Tower Argent embattled masoned issuant from a Mount Vert between two Mullets of the second.

== Demographics ==
Aristau has a population (as of December 2020) of 1,512 As of June 2009, 12.8% of the population are foreign nationals. Over the last 10 years (1997–2007) the population has changed at a rate of 10.3%. Most of the population (as of 2000) speaks German (94.7%), with Portuguese being second most common ( 1.1%) and French being third ( 0.9%).

The age distribution, as of 2008, in Aristau is; 122 children or 9.4% of the population are between 0 and 9 years old and 193 teenagers or 14.9% are between 10 and 19. Of the adult population, 149 people or 11.5% of the population are between 20 and 29 years old. 151 people or 11.7% are between 30 and 39, 290 people or 22.4% are between 40 and 49, and 202 people or 15.6% are between 50 and 59. The senior population distribution is 99 people or 7.7% of the population are between 60 and 69 years old, 65 people or 5.0% are between 70 and 79, there are 22 people or 1.7% who are between 80 and 89, and there is 1 person who is 90 or older.

As of 2000 the average number of residents per living room was 0.6 which is about equal to the cantonal average of 0.57 per room. In this case, a room is defined as space of a housing unit of at least 4 m^{2} (43 sq ft) as normal bedrooms, dining rooms, living rooms, kitchens and habitable cellars and attics. About 61% of the total households were owner occupied, or in other words did not pay rent (though they may have a mortgage or a rent-to-own agreement).

As of 2000, there were 28 homes with 1 or 2 persons in the household, 171 homes with 3 or 4 persons in the household, and 216 homes with 5 or more persons in the household. As of 2000, there were 430 private households (homes and apartments) in the municipality, and an average of 2.7 persons per household. In 2008 there were 237 single family homes (or 45.6% of the total) out of a total of 520 homes and apartments. There were a total of 15 empty apartments for a 2.9% vacancy rate. As of 2007, the construction rate of new housing units was 11.8 new units per 1000 residents.

In the 2007 federal election the most popular party was the SVP which received 33.7% of the vote. The next three most popular parties were the CVP (22.5%), the FDP (12.8%) and the SP (12.7%).

The historical population is given in the following table:

Historical population
Year	Pop.	±%
1836	886	—
1850	937	+5.8%
1900	753	−19.6%
1950	785	+4.2%
2000	1,197	+52.5%

== Economy ==
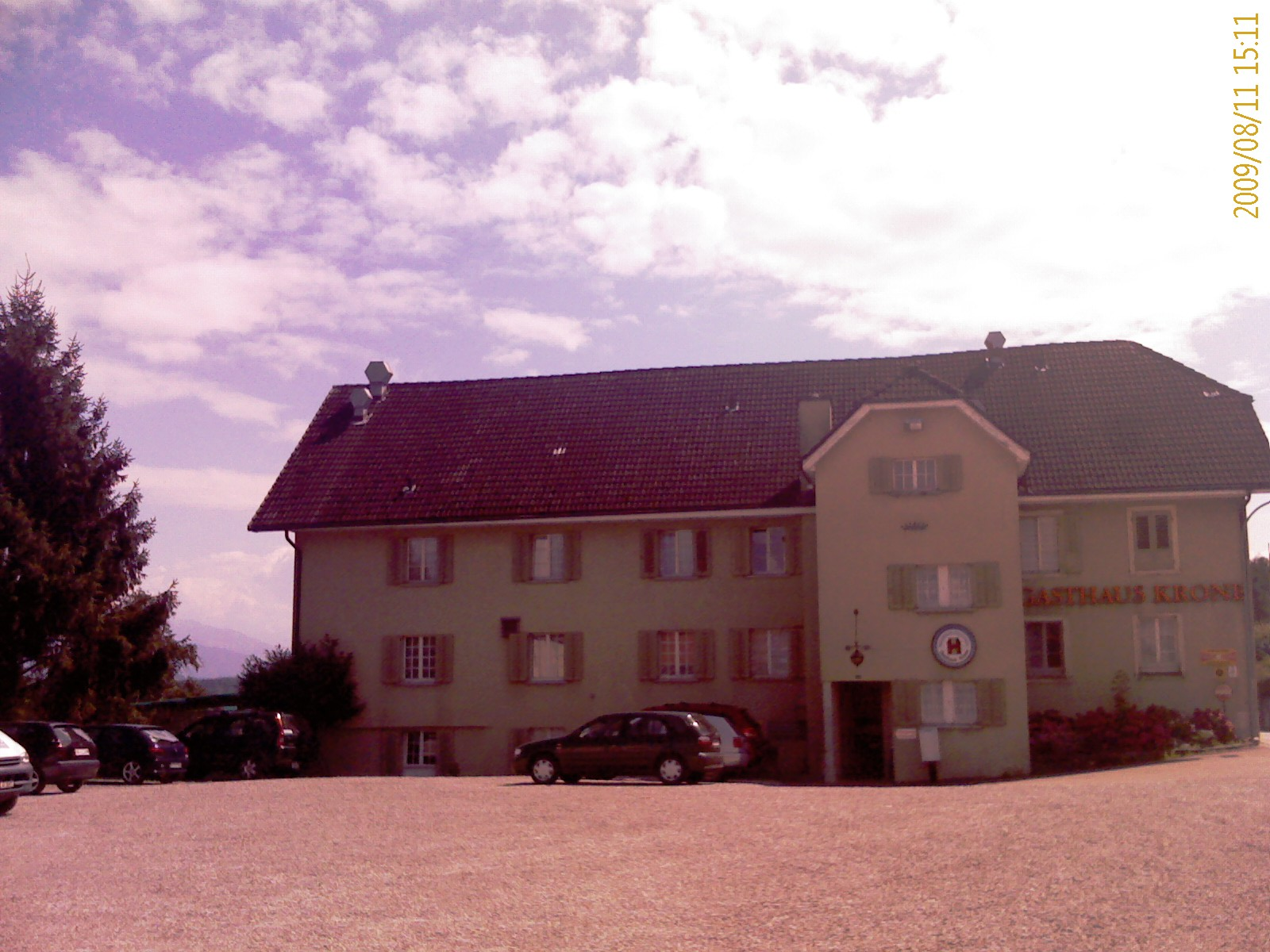
Gasthaus (Restaurant and hotel) Krone in Birri village

As of 2007, Aristau had an unemployment rate of 1.67%. As of 2005, there were 119 people employed in the primary economic sector and about 37 businesses involved in this sector. 26 people are employed in the secondary sector and there are 11 businesses in this sector. 79 people are employed in the tertiary sector, with 29 businesses in this sector.

In 2000 there were 648 workers who lived in the municipality. Of these, 523 or about 80.7% of the residents worked outside Aristau while 38 people commuted into the municipality for work. There were a total of 163 jobs (of at least 6 hours per week) in the municipality. Of the working population, 9.2% used public transportation to get to work, and 59.5% used a private car.

== Religion ==
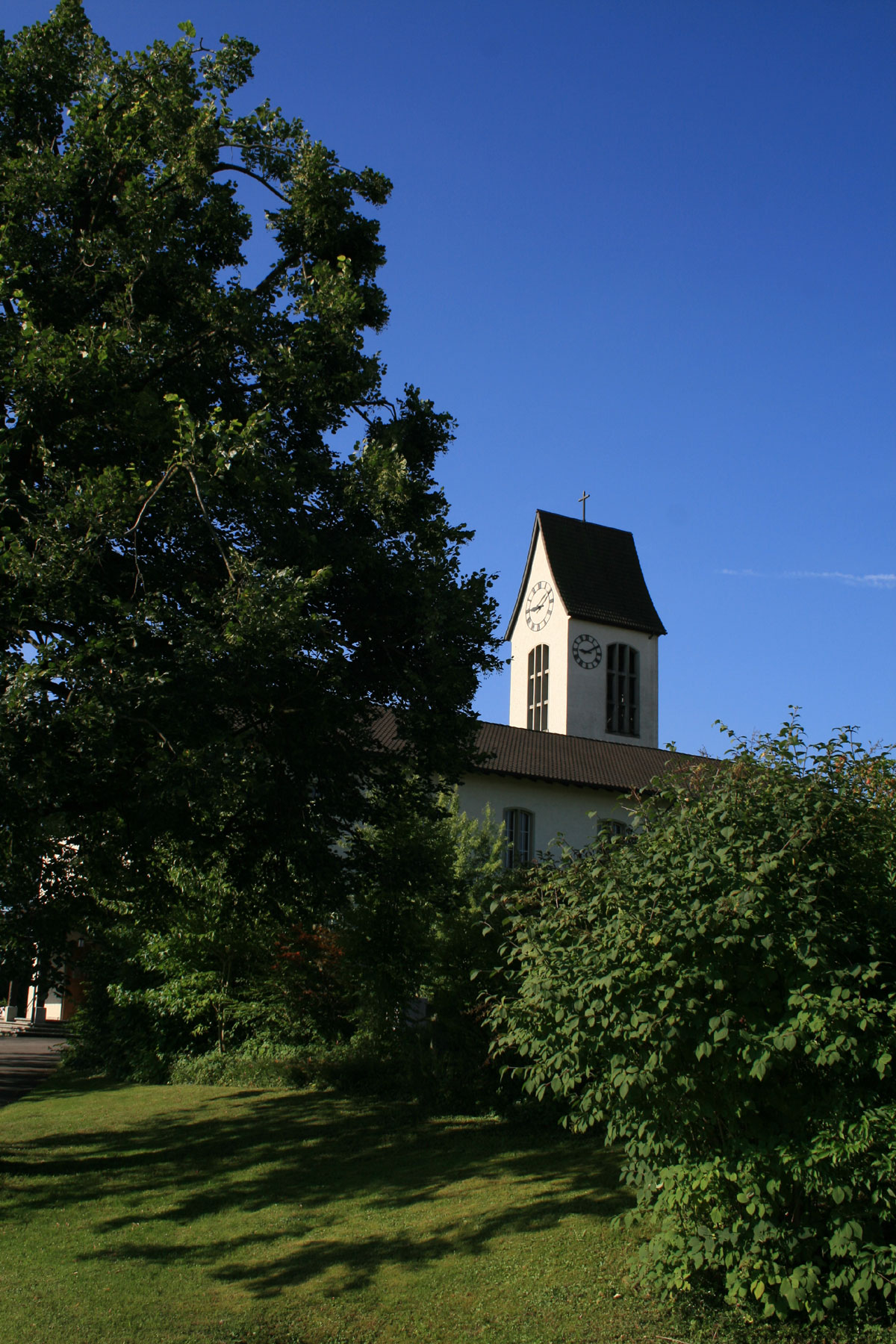
Roman Catholic church in Aristau

From the 2000 census, 678 or 56.6% were Roman Catholic, while 309 or 25.8% belonged to the Swiss Reformed Church.

== Education ==
The entire Swiss population is generally well educated. In Aristau about 76.8% of the population (between age 25-64) have completed either non-mandatory upper secondary education or additional higher education (either university or a Fachhochschule). Of the school age population (in the 2008/2009 school year), there are 106 students attending primary school in the municipality.

== Notable people ==
- Ines Torelli (born 1931), comedian, radio personality, and stage, voice and film actress
