= Lag digl Oberst =

Lake in the Grisons, Switzerland

- Lag Pign
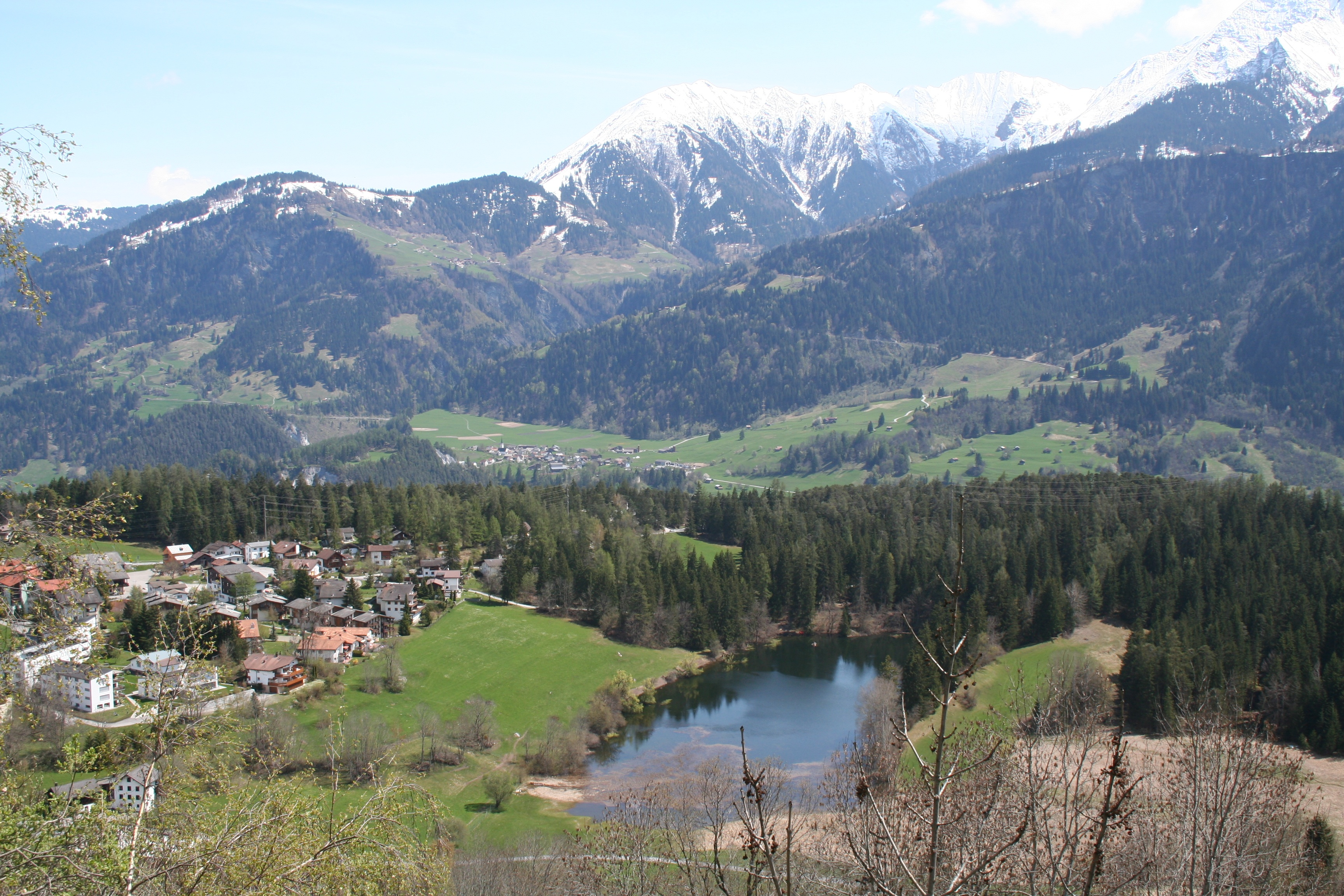

- Location within Canton of Graubünden Location within Switzerland Location within Italy Location within Alps
- Interactive map of Lag digl Oberst
- Location: Laax, Grisons
- Coordinates: 46°48′0″N 9°15′10″E
- Basin countries: Switzerland
- Surface elevation: 970 m (3,180 ft)
- Frozen: winter

Lag digl Obert or Lag Pign is a lake in the village of Laax, Grisons, Switzerland.
