= Damphreux-Lugnez =

- Municipality
- Flag Coat of arms
- Location of Damphreux-Lugnez
- Location within Switzerland Location within Canton of Jura
- Coordinates: 47°29′05″N 07°05′55″E
- Country: Switzerland
- Canton: Jura
- District: Porrentruy

Government
  - Executive: Conseil communal with 5 members
  - Mayor: Maire; Henry Michel (as of 2026)

Area
  - Total: 10.77 km^{2} (4.16 sq mi)
- Elevation: 411 m (1,348 ft)

Population (2020)
  - Total: 369
  - Density: 34.3/km^{2} (88.7/sq mi)
- Time zone: UTC+01:00 (CET)
  - Summer (DST): UTC+02:00 (CEST)
- Postal code: 2933
- SFOS number: 6811
- ISO 3166 code: CH-JU
- Surrounded by: Basse-Vendline, Vendlincourt, Coeuve, Courtemaîche, Montignez, Réchésy (F), Courcelles (F)
- Website: https://www.damphreux-lugnez.ch/ SFSO statistics

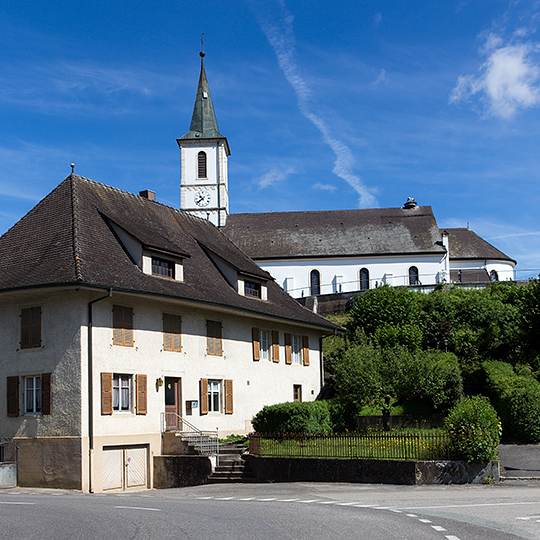
Church in the area

Damphreux-Lugnez is a municipality in the district of Porrentruy in the canton of Jura in Switzerland. It was established on 1 January 2023 with the merger of the municipalities of Damphreux and Lugnez.

== History ==
Damphreux was first mentioned in 1161 as Damfriol. Lugnez was first mentioned around 501-600 as Lugduniaco. In 1225, it was mentioned as Lunigie. On 1 January 2023, these two municipalities were merged to form the new municipality of Damphreux-Lugnez.
