= Basse-Allaine =

- Municipality
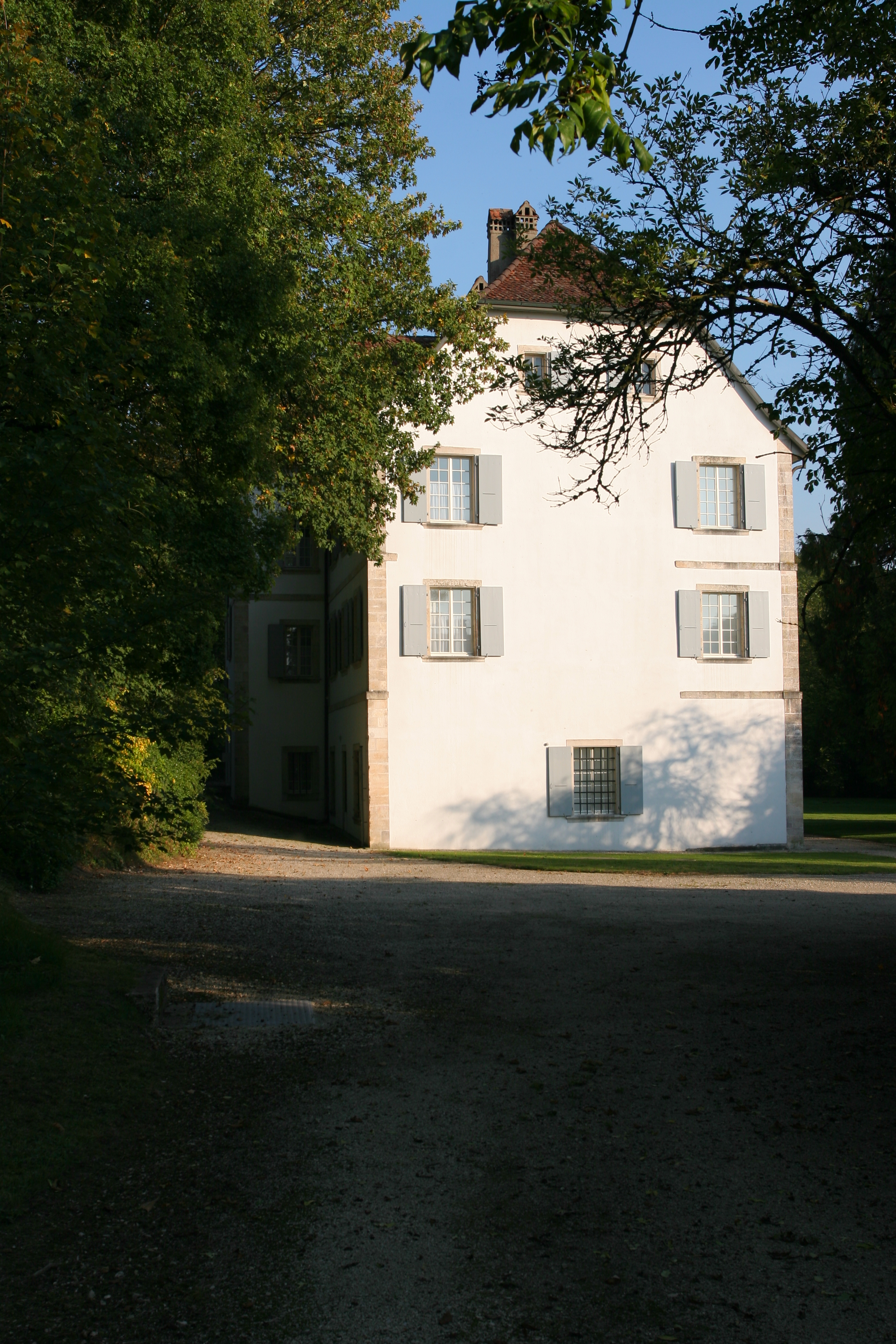
- East facade of the priory of Grandgourt in Basse-Allaine

- Coat of arms
- Location of Basse-Allaine
- Location within Switzerland Location within Canton of Jura
- Coordinates: 47°27′N 07°02′E
- Country: Switzerland
- Canton: Jura
- District: Porrentruy

Government
  - Executive: Conseil communal with 7 members
  - Mayor: Maire; Thierry Crétin (as of 2026)

Area
  - Total: 23.05 km^{2} (8.90 sq mi)
- Elevation: 398 m (1,306 ft)

Population (December 2020)
  - Total: 1,241
  - Density: 53.84/km^{2} (139.4/sq mi)
- Time zone: UTC+01:00 (CET)
  - Summer (DST): UTC+02:00 (CEST)
- Postal code: 2923
- SFOS number: 6807
- ISO 3166 code: CH-JU
- Surrounded by: Boncourt, Bure, Coeuve, Courchavon, Damphreux, Lugnez, Courcelles (F), Villars-le-Sec (F)
- Website: http://www.basse-allaine.ch/

Basse-Allaine (French pronunciation: [bas alɛn]) is a municipality in the district of Porrentruy in the canton of Jura in Switzerland. On 1 January 2009 the former municipalities of Buix, Courtemaîche and Montignez merged to form Basse-Allaine.

The name refers to the river Allaine which runs through the municipality.

== History ==
Buix is first mentioned in 1136 as Bus. Courtemaîche is first mentioned in 1139 as Cordomasge. Montignez is first mentioned in 731 as Montaniaco.

== Geography ==
Basse-Allaine has an area of 23.04 km^{2} (8.90 sq mi). Of this area, 10.13 km^{2} (3.91 mi^{2}) or 43.9% is used for agricultural purposes, while 10.95 km^{2} (4.23 mi^{2}) or 47.5% is forested. Of the rest of the land, 1.7 km^{2} (0.66 mi^{2}) or 7.4% is settled (buildings or roads), 0.09 km^{2} (22 acres) or 0.4% is either rivers or lakes and 0.12 km^{2} (30 acres) or 0.5% is unproductive land.

Of the built up area, housing and buildings made up 3.6% and transportation infrastructure made up 2.8%. Out of the forested land, all of the forested land area is covered with heavy forests. Of the agricultural land, 28.4% is used for growing crops and 14.2% is pastures, while 1.3% is used for orchards or vine crops. All the water in the municipality is flowing water.

The municipality consists of the villages of Buix, Courtemaîche and Montignez, the hamlet of Le Maira and the land around the Grandgourt priory.

== Demographics ==
Basse-Allaine has a population (as of December 2020) of 1,241. As of 2010, 7.3% of the population are resident foreign nationals. Over the last 10 years (2000–2010) the population has changed at a rate of -4.1%. Migration accounted for -2.5%, while births and deaths accounted for -1.8%.

Most of the population (as of 2000) speaks French (93.9%) as their first language, German is the second most common (4.0%) and Spanish is the third (0.9%).

As of 2008, the population was 48.9% male and 51.1% female. The population was made up of 588 Swiss men (45.1% of the population) and 50 (3.8%) non-Swiss men. There were 622 Swiss women (47.7%) and 45 (3.4%) non-Swiss women. As of 2000, children and teenagers (0–19 years old) make up 23.5% of the population, while adults (20–64 years old) make up 57.1% and seniors (over 64 years old) make up 19.4%.

As of 2009, the construction rate of new housing units was 3.8 new units per 1000 residents. The vacancy rate for the municipality, in 2010, was 3.53%.

== Historic Population ==
The historical population is given in the following chart:

== Heritage sites of national significance ==
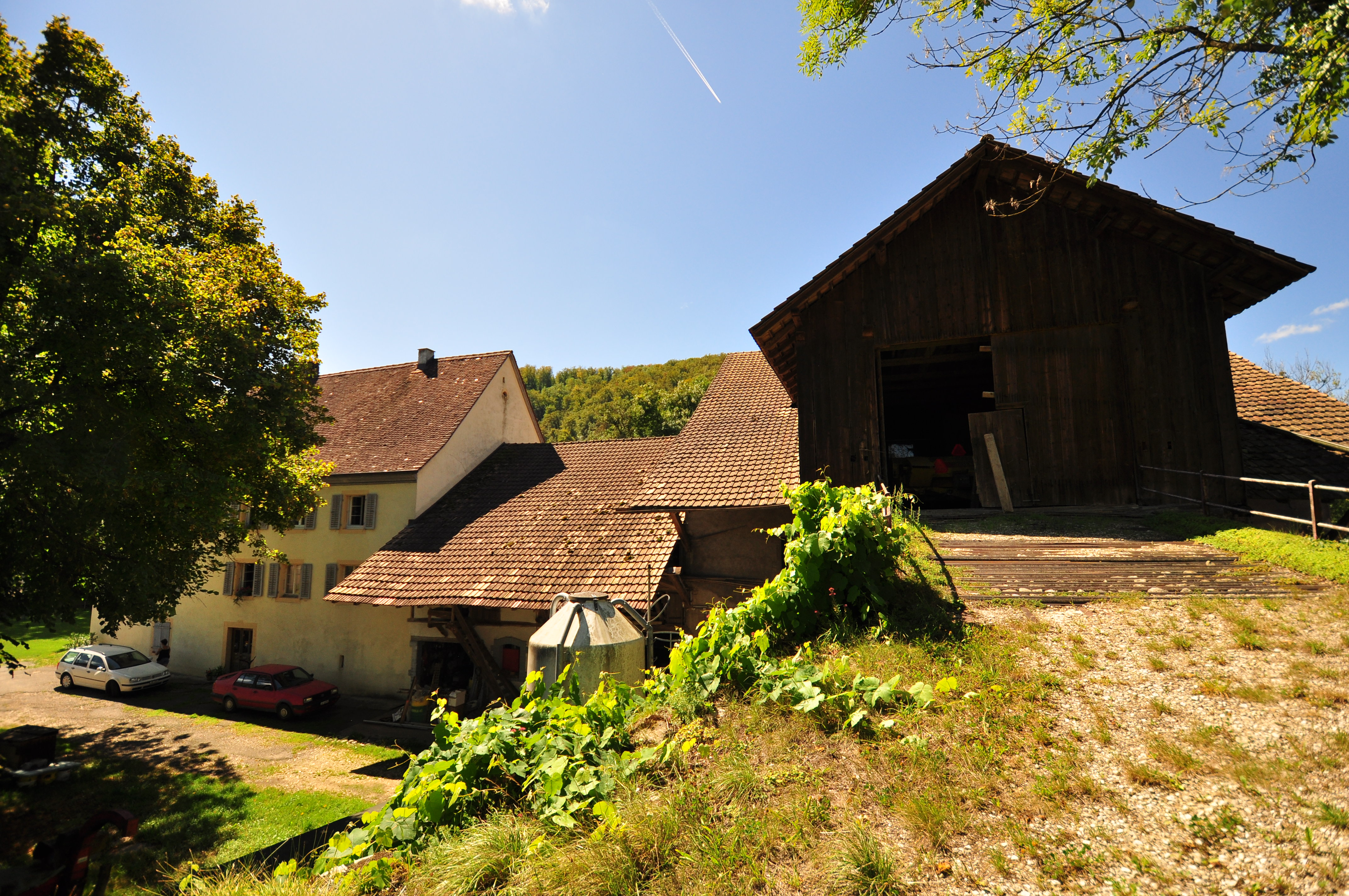
Prairie Dessous on the site of a Gallo-Roman villa

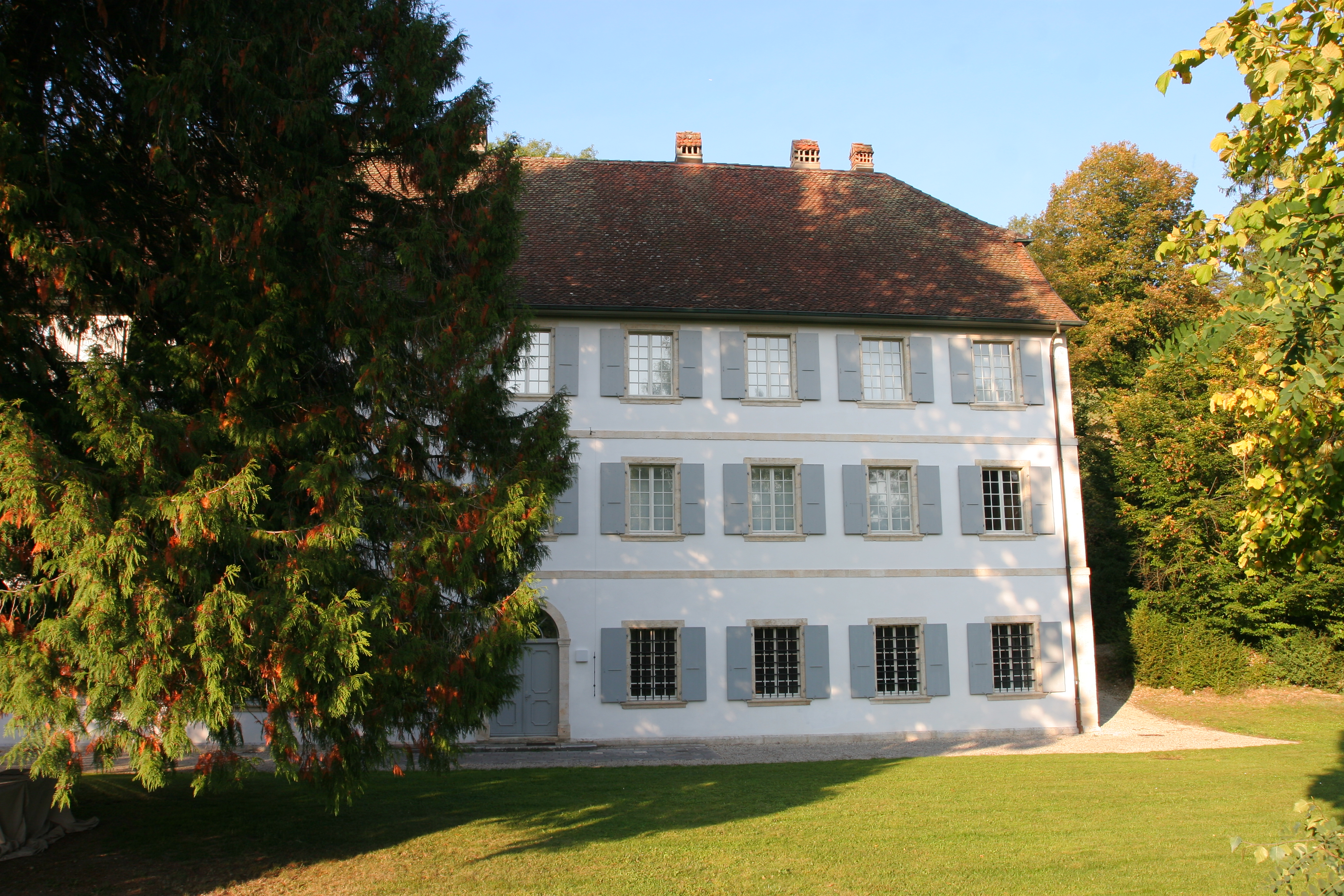
Former priory of Grandgourt

Prairie Dessous on the site of a Gallo-Roman villa and the former priory of Grandgourt are listed as Swiss heritage site of national significance. The village of Montignez, hamlet of Le Maira and Grandgourt area are all part of the Inventory of Swiss Heritage Sites.

== Economy ==
As of 2010, Basse-Allaine had an unemployment rate of 4.6%. As of 2008, there were 164 people employed in the primary economic sector and about 39 businesses involved in this sector. 219 people were employed in the secondary sector and there were 13 businesses in this sector. 96 people were employed in the tertiary sector, with 27 businesses in this sector. Of the working population, 6% used public transportation to get to work, and 64.2% used a private car.

== Education ==
The Canton of Jura school system provides two year of non-obligatory Kindergarten, followed by six years of Primary school. This is followed by three years of obligatory lower Secondary school where the students are separated according to ability and aptitude. Following the lower Secondary students may attend a three or four year optional upper Secondary school followed by some form of Tertiary school or they may enter an apprenticeship.

During the 2009-10 school year, there were a total of 125 students attending 8 classes in Basse-Allaine. There were 2 kindergarten classes with a total of 39 students in the municipality. The municipality had 6 primary classes and 86 students. There are only nine Secondary schools in the canton, so all the students from Basse-Allaine attend their secondary school in another municipality.

== Transportation ==
The municipality has two railway stations: Buix and Courtemaîche. Both are located on the Delémont–Delle line and have regular service to Biel/Bienne and Meroux (in France). A third, Grandgourt, closed in 2022.
