= Beurnevésin =

- Former municipality
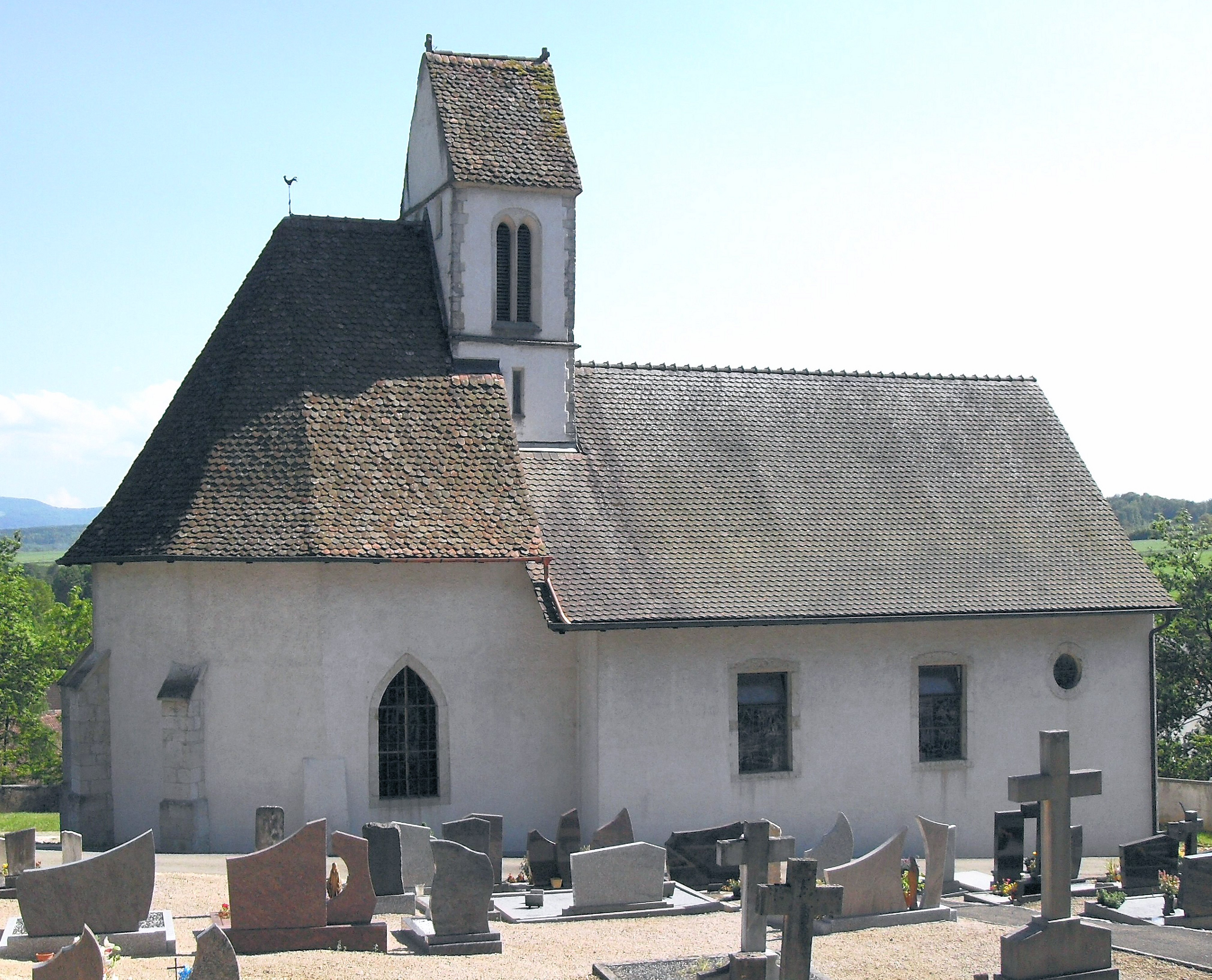
- Village church of Saint Jacques

- Flag Coat of arms
- Location of Beurnevésin
- Location within Switzerland Location within Canton of Jura
- Coordinates: 47°29′N 07°08′E
- Country: Switzerland
- Canton: Jura
- District: Porrentruy

Government
  - Mayor: Maire

Area
  - Total: 5.1 km^{2} (2.0 sq mi)
- Elevation: 422 m (1,385 ft)

Population (2003)
  - Total: 154
  - Density: 30/km^{2} (78/sq mi)
- Time zone: UTC+01:00 (CET)
  - Summer (DST): UTC+02:00 (CEST)
- Postal code: 2935
- SFOS number: 6773
- ISO 3166 code: CH-JU
- Surrounded by: Lugnez, Damphreux, Bonfol, Pfetterhouse (F), Réchésy (F)
- Website: SFSO statistics

Beurnevésin (French pronunciation: [bœʁnəvezɛ̃]; Frainc-Comtou: Beuvenéjin) is a former municipality in the district of Porrentruy in the canton of Jura in Switzerland.

== History ==
The village, about 1914.

Beurnevésin is first mentioned in 1270 as Brunnevisin. The municipality was formerly known by its German name Brischwiler, however, that name is no longer used. On 1 January 2024, Beurnevésin is set to merge with Bonfol to form the new municipality of Basse-Vendline.

== Geography ==
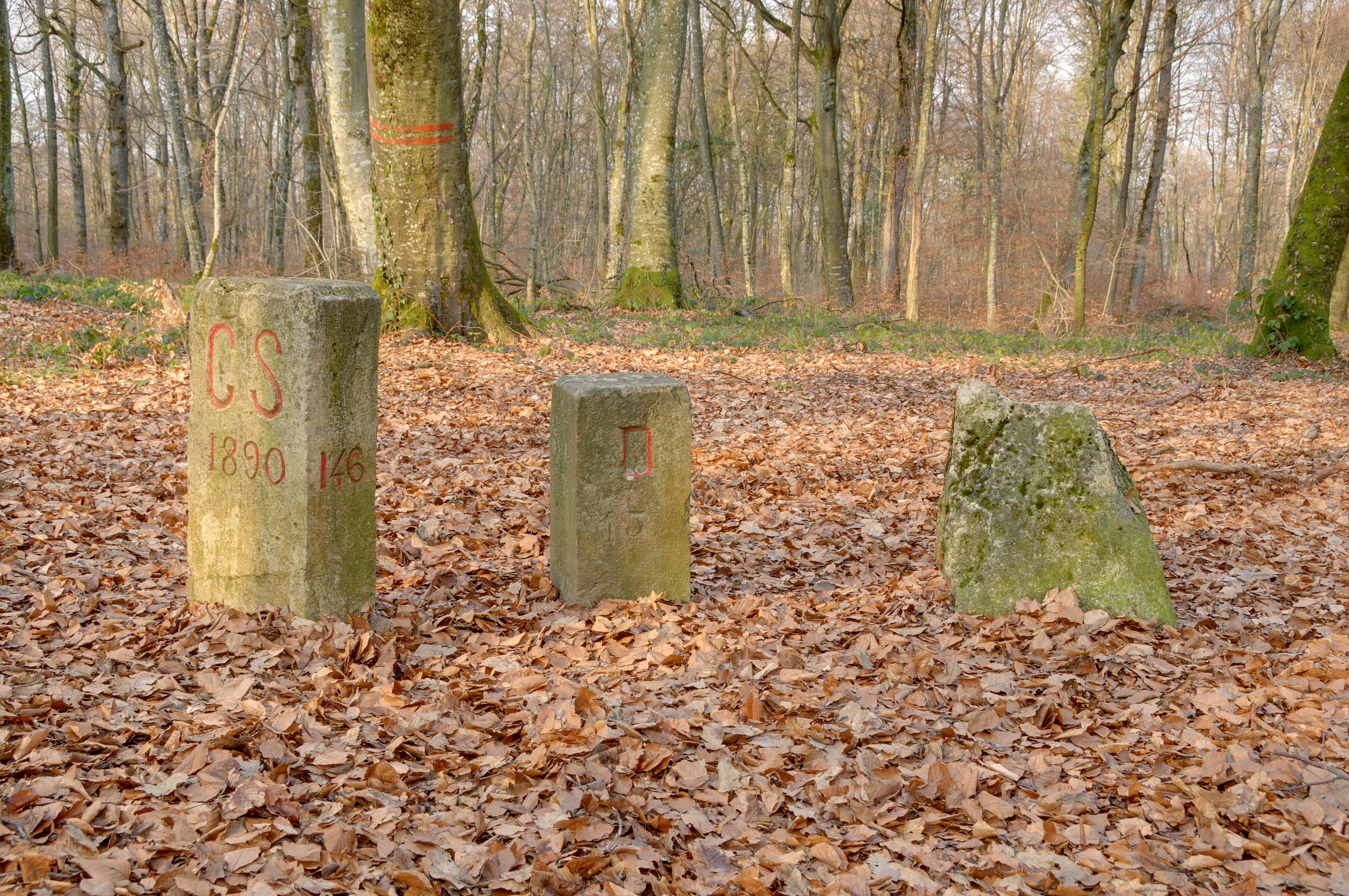
Marker stones near Beurnevésin village. On the left, the border between Switzerland, France and Germany from 1871 to 1914. In the middle, France and Germany before 1871. On the right, the base of a stone from the time of the Habsburgs.

Beurnevésin has an area of 5.09 km^{2} (1.97 sq mi). Of this area, 2.83 km^{2} (1.09 mi^{2}) or 55.6% is used for agricultural purposes, while 1.97 km^{2} (0.76 mi^{2}) or 38.7% is forested. Of the rest of the land, 0.26 km^{2} (0.10 mi^{2}) or 5.1% is settled (buildings or roads), 0.04 km^{2} (9.9 acres) or 0.8% is either rivers or lakes.

Of the built up area, housing and buildings made up 2.6% and transportation infrastructure made up 2.6%. Out of the forested land, 36.5% of the total land area is heavily forested and 2.2% is covered with orchards or small clusters of trees. Of the agricultural land, 41.3% is used for growing crops and 13.0% is pastures and 1.4% is used for alpine pastures. All the water in the municipality is flowing water.

The municipality is located in the Porrentruy district, in the north-eastern section of the Ajoie region.

== Coat of arms ==
The blazon of the municipal coat of arms is Argent, a Chevron raised embowed Vert between three Mullets of five Gules.

== Demographics ==
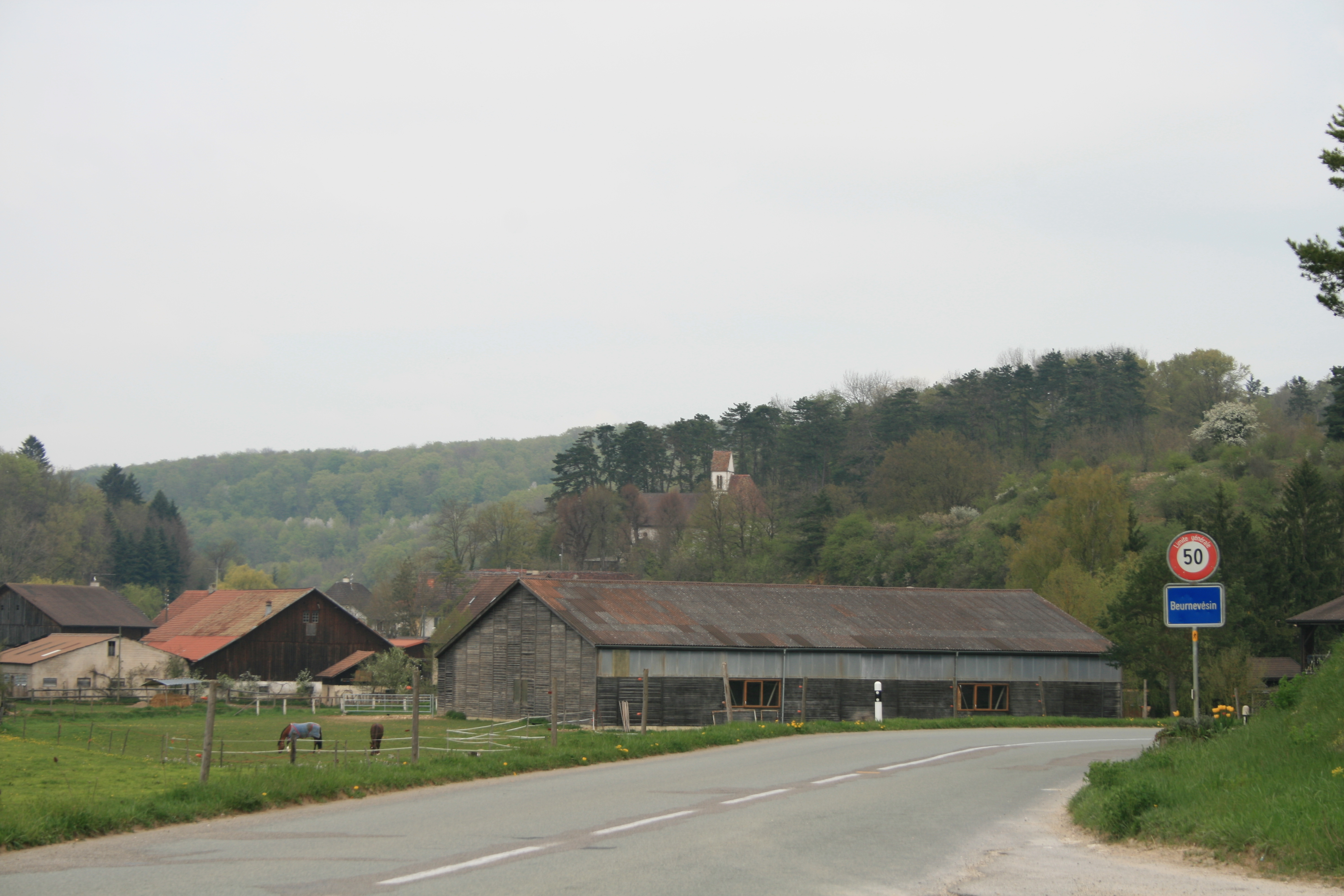
Beurnevésin village

Beurnevésin has a population (as of December 2020) of 119. As of 2008, 12.3% of the population are resident foreign nationals. Over the last 10 years (2000–2010) the population has changed at a rate of -11.8%. Migration accounted for -4.1%, while births and deaths accounted for -5.3%.

Most of the population (as of 2000) speaks French (131 or 83.4%) as their first language, German is the second most common (25 or 15.9%) and Italian is the third (1 or 0.6%).

As of 2008, the population was 50.0% male and 50.0% female. The population was made up of 61 Swiss men (40.7% of the population) and 14 (9.3%) non-Swiss men. There were 71 Swiss women (47.3%) and 4 (2.7%) non-Swiss women. Of the population in the municipality, 70 or about 44.6% were born in Beurnevésin and lived there in 2000. There were 41 or 26.1% who were born in the same canton, while 33 or 21.0% were born somewhere else in Switzerland, and 13 or 8.3% were born outside of Switzerland.

As of 2000, children and teenagers (0–19 years old) make up 27.4% of the population, while adults (20–64 years old) make up 56.7% and seniors (over 64 years old) make up 15.9%.

As of 2000, there were 62 people who were single and never married in the municipality. There were 85 married individuals, 8 widows or widowers and 2 individuals who are divorced.

As of 2000, there were 59 private households in the municipality, and an average of 2.6 persons per household. There were 16 households that consist of only one person and 8 households with five or more people. In 2000, a total of 57 apartments (81.4% of the total) were permanently occupied, while 8 apartments (11.4%) were seasonally occupied and 5 apartments (7.1%) were empty. The vacancy rate for the municipality, in 2010, was 11.11%.

The historical population is given in the following chart:

== Politics ==
In the 2007 federal election the most popular party was the SPS which received 30.84% of the vote. The next three most popular parties were the CVP (28.97%), the FDP (27.1%) and the SVP (12.15%). In the federal election, a total of 54 votes were cast, and the voter turnout was 42.9%.

== Economy ==
As of 2010, Beurnevésin had an unemployment rate of 2%. As of 2008, there were 27 people employed in the primary economic sector and about 9 businesses involved in this sector. No one was employed in the secondary sector. 9 people were employed in the tertiary sector, with 6 businesses in this sector. There were 81 residents of the municipality who were employed in some capacity, of which females made up 48.1% of the workforce.

In 2008 the total number of full-time equivalent jobs was 24. The number of jobs in the primary sector was 18, all of which were in agriculture. There were no jobs in the secondary sector. The number of jobs in the tertiary sector was 6 of which, 3 were in wholesale or retail sales or the repair of motor vehicles and 2 were in a hotel or restaurant.

In 2000, there were 13 workers who commuted into the municipality and 49 workers who commuted away. The municipality is a net exporter of workers, with about 3.8 workers leaving the municipality for every one entering. About 30.8% of the workforce coming into Beurnevésin are coming from outside Switzerland. Of the working population, 7.4% used public transportation to get to work, and 54.3% used a private car.

== Religion ==
From the 2000 census, 100 or 63.7% were Roman Catholic, while 33 or 21.0% belonged to the Swiss Reformed Church. Of the rest of the population, there was 1 individual who belongs to the Christian Catholic Church, and there were 18 individuals (or about 11.46% of the population) who belonged to another Christian church. 10 (or about 6.37% of the population) belonged to no church, are agnostic or atheist, and 4 individuals (or about 2.55% of the population) did not answer the question.

== Education ==
In Beurnevésin about 37 or (23.6%) of the population have completed non-mandatory upper secondary education, and 11 or (7.0%) have completed additional higher education (either university or a Fachhochschule). Of the 11 who completed tertiary schooling, 63.6% were Swiss men, 18.2% were Swiss women.

The Canton of Jura school system provides two year of non-obligatory Kindergarten, followed by six years of Primary school. This is followed by three years of obligatory lower Secondary school where the students are separated according to ability and aptitude. Following the lower Secondary students may attend a three or four year optional upper Secondary school followed by some form of Tertiary school or they may enter an apprenticeship.

During the 2009-10 school year, there were no students attending school in Beurnevésin.

As of 2000, there were 14 students in Beurnevésin who came from another municipality, while 14 residents attended schools outside the municipality.
