= Lugnez =

- Former municipality
- Coat of arms
- Location of Lugnez
- Location within Switzerland Location within Canton of Jura
- Coordinates: 47°29′N 07°06′E
- Country: Switzerland
- Canton: Jura
- District: Porrentruy

Government
  - Mayor: Maire

Area
  - Total: 5.13 km^{2} (1.98 sq mi)
- Elevation: 411 m (1,348 ft)

Population (2003)
  - Total: 214
  - Density: 41.7/km^{2} (108/sq mi)
- Time zone: UTC+01:00 (CET)
  - Summer (DST): UTC+02:00 (CEST)
- Postal code: 2933
- SFOS number: 6793
- ISO 3166 code: CH-JU
- Surrounded by: Montignez, Damphreux, Beurnevésin, Réchésy(F), Courcelles(F)
- Website: www.jura.ch/lugnez

Lugnez is a former municipality in the district of Porrentruy in the canton of Jura in Switzerland.

== History ==
Lugnez is first mentioned around 501-600 as Lugduniaco. In 1225 it was mentioned as Lunigie. On 1 January 2023, Damphreux and Lugnez were merged to form the new municipality of Damphreux-Lugnez.

== Geography ==
Lugnez has an area of 5.1 km^{2} (1.97 sq mi). Of this area, 3.03 km^{2} (1.17 mi^{2}) or 59.4% is used for agricultural purposes, while 1.76 km^{2} (0.68 mi^{2}) or 34.5% is forested. Of the rest of the land, 0.31 km^{2} (0.12 mi^{2}) or 6.1% is settled (buildings or roads), 0.01 km^{2} (2.5 acres) or 0.2% is either rivers or lakes.

Of the built up area, housing and buildings made up 2.4% and transportation infrastructure made up 2.9%. Out of the forested land, all of the forested land area is covered with heavy forests. Of the agricultural land, 43.1% is used for growing crops and 15.9% is pastures. All the water in the municipality is flowing water.

The municipality is located in the Porrentruy district, in the eastern portion of the Ajoie. The village sits at the intersection of several roads that all lead into France.

== Coat of arms ==
The blazon of the municipal coat of arms is Argent, a Saltire engrailed Gules.

== Demographics ==
Lugnez has a population (as of December 2020) of 188. As of 2008, 5.2% of the population are resident foreign nationals. Over the last 10 years (2000–2010) the population has changed at a rate of -5.9%. Migration accounted for 2.7%, while births and deaths accounted for -5.5%.

Most of the population (as of 2000) speaks French (194 or 85.5%) as their first language, German is the second most common (26 or 11.5%) and Portuguese is the third (4 or 1.8%). There is 1 person who speaks Italian.

As of 2008, the population was 48.3% male and 51.7% female. The population was made up of 94 Swiss men (45.4% of the population) and 6 (2.9%) non-Swiss men. There were 103 Swiss women (49.8%) and 4 (1.9%) non-Swiss women. Of the population in the municipality, 98 or about 43.2% were born in Lugnez and lived there in 2000. There were 64 or 28.2% who were born in the same canton, while 37 or 16.3% were born somewhere else in Switzerland, and 27 or 11.9% were born outside of Switzerland.

As of 2000, children and teenagers (0–19 years old) make up 25.6% of the population, while adults (20–64 years old) make up 55.5% and seniors (over 64 years old) make up 18.9%.

As of 2000, there were 90 people who were single and never married in the municipality. There were 114 married individuals, 15 widows or widowers and 8 individuals who are divorced.

As of 2000, there were 80 private households in the municipality, and an average of 2.8 persons per household. There were 14 households that consist of only one person and 11 households with five or more people. In 2000, a total of 80 apartments (82.5% of the total) were permanently occupied, while 11 apartments (11.3%) were seasonally occupied and 6 apartments (6.2%) were empty. The vacancy rate for the municipality, in 2010, was 4.85%.

The historical population is given in the following chart:

== Politics ==
In the 2007 federal election the most popular party was the FDP which received 44.12% of the vote. The next three most popular parties were the CVP (24.71%), the SPS (21.18%) and the SVP (9.41%). In the federal election, a total of 87 votes were cast, and the voter turnout was 51.5%.

== Economy ==
As of 2010, Lugnez had an unemployment rate of 4.6%. As of 2008, there were 29 people employed in the primary economic sector and about 9 businesses involved in this sector. 26 people were employed in the secondary sector and there were 3 businesses in this sector. 2 people were employed in the tertiary sector, with 2 businesses in this sector. There were 106 residents of the municipality who were employed in some capacity, of which females made up 39.6% of the workforce.

In 2008 the total number of full-time equivalent jobs was 50. The number of jobs in the primary sector was 23, all of which were in agriculture. The number of jobs in the secondary sector was 25 of which 4 or (16.0%) were in manufacturing and 21 (84.0%) were in construction. The number of jobs in the tertiary sector was 2. In the tertiary sector; 1 was in the sale or repair of motor vehicles, and 1 was a technical professional or scientist.

In 2000, there were 30 workers who commuted into the municipality and 64 workers who commuted away. The municipality is a net exporter of workers, with about 2.1 workers leaving the municipality for every one entering. About 20.0% of the workforce coming into Lugnez are coming from outside Switzerland. Of the working population, 4.7% used public transportation to get to work, and 58.5% used a private car.

== Religion ==
From the 2000 census, 180 or 79.3% were Roman Catholic, while 25 or 11.0% belonged to the Swiss Reformed Church. Of the rest of the population, there were 10 individuals (or about 4.41% of the population) who belonged to another Christian church. 15 (or about 6.61% of the population) belonged to no church, are agnostic or atheist, and 2 individuals (or about 0.88% of the population) did not answer the question.

== Education ==
In Lugnez about 61 or (26.9%) of the population have completed non-mandatory upper secondary education, and 5 or (2.2%) have completed additional higher education (either university or a Fachhochschule). Of the 5 who completed tertiary schooling, 60.0% were Swiss men, 40.0% were Swiss women.

The Canton of Jura school system provides two year of non-obligatory Kindergarten, followed by six years of Primary school. This is followed by three years of obligatory lower Secondary school where the students are separated according to ability and aptitude. Following the lower Secondary students may attend a three or four year optional upper Secondary school followed by some form of Tertiary school or they may enter an apprenticeship.

During the 2009-10 school year, there were no students attending school in Lugnez.

As of 2000, there were 3 students in Lugnez who came from another municipality, while 32 residents attended schools outside the municipality.
