= Buix =

- Former municipality
- Location of Buix
- Location within Switzerland Location within Canton of Jura
- Coordinates: 47°29′N 07°02′E
- Country: Switzerland
- Canton: Jura
- District: Porrentruy

Government
  - Mayor: Thierry Crétin

Area
  - Total: 8.23 km^{2} (3.18 sq mi)
- Elevation: 383 m (1,257 ft)

Population (2003)
  - Total: 476
  - Density: 57.8/km^{2} (150/sq mi)
- Time zone: UTC+01:00 (CET)
  - Summer (DST): UTC+02:00 (CEST)
- Postal code: 2925
- SFOS number: 6777
- ISO 3166 code: CH-JU
- Surrounded by: Montignez, Courtemaîche, Bure, Boncourt, Villars-le-Sec (F), Courcelles (F)
- Website: www.buix.ch

Buix (Frainc-Comtou: Boé) is a former municipality in the district of Porrentruy in the canton of Jura in Switzerland.

Aerial view (1950)

On 1 January 2009 the former municipalities of Buix, Courtemaîche and Montignez merged to form the new municipality of Basse-Allaine.

The village is situated in a small valley in the middle of which runs the river Allaine.
