= Kurzel =

Kurzel is a surname and may refer to:

- Jed Kurzel (born 1976), Australian film composer and musician
- Justin Kurzel (born 1974), Australian film director and screenwriter

Kurzel may also refer to:

- the old German name of Courcelles, Territoire de Belfort, France
- the old German name of Courcelles-Chaussy, France
