= Bonfol =

- Former municipality
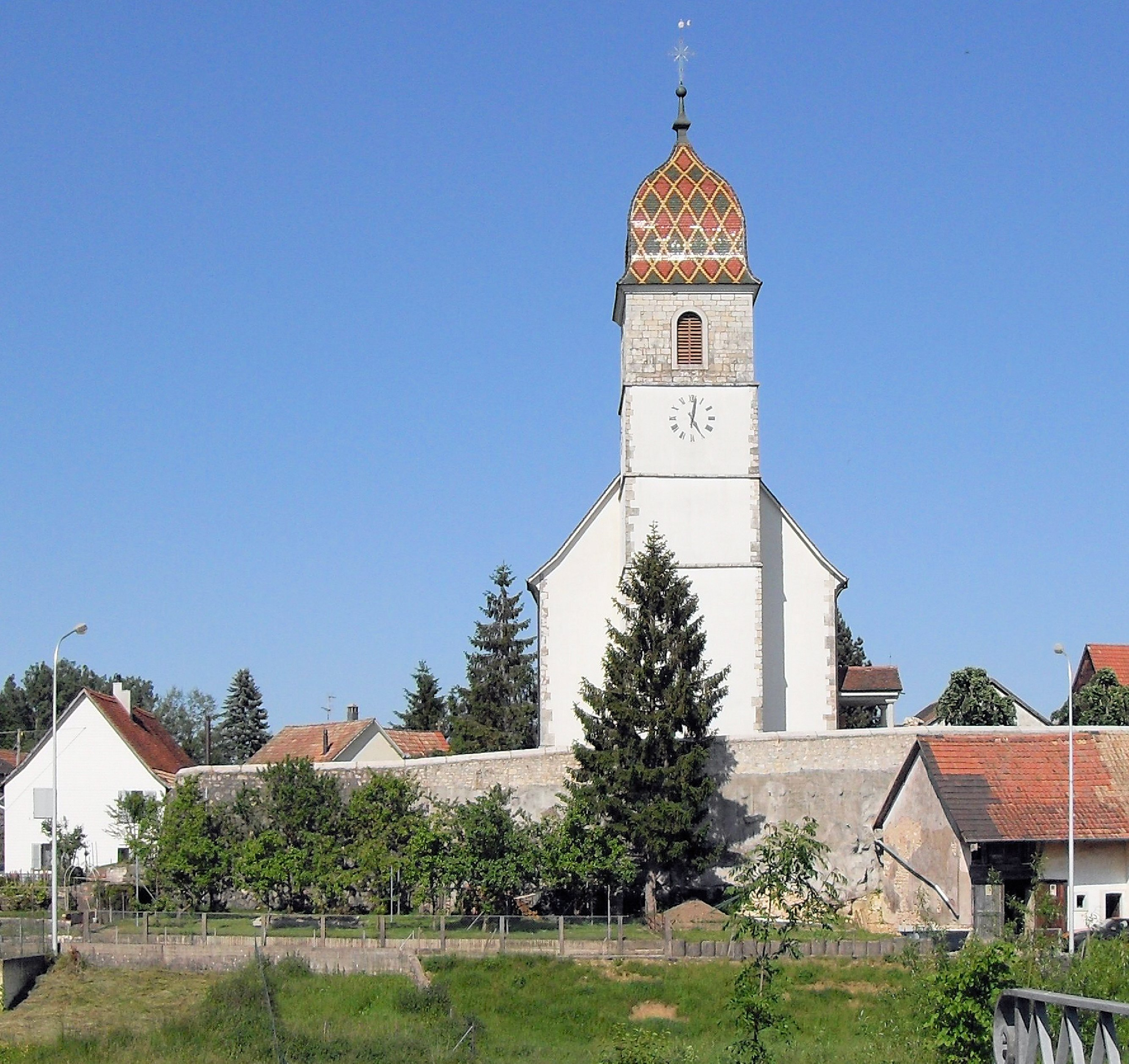
- The church of Saint-Laurent at Bonfol

- Flag Coat of arms
- Location of Bonfol
- Location within Switzerland Location within Canton of Jura
- Coordinates: 47°29′N 07°09′E
- Country: Switzerland
- Canton: Jura
- District: Porrentruy

Government
  - Mayor: Maire; Jean-Denis Henzelin

Area
  - Total: 13.59 km^{2} (5.25 sq mi)
- Elevation: 432 m (1,417 ft)

Population (2004)
  - Total: 668
  - Density: 49.2/km^{2} (127/sq mi)
- Demonym: les Bâts (les Crapauds)
- Time zone: UTC+01:00 (CET)
  - Summer (DST): UTC+02:00 (CEST)
- Postal code: 2944
- SFOS number: 6775
- ISO 3166 code: CH-JU
- Localities: -
- Surrounded by: Beurnevésin, Damphreux, Vendlincourt, Courtavon(F), Pfetterhouse(F)
- Website: www.bonfol.ch

Bonfol (French pronunciation: [bɔ̃fɔl]; Frainc-Comtou: Bonfô) is a former municipality in the district of Porrentruy in the canton of Jura in Switzerland. It was also home to one of the most hazardous waste landfills in all of Switzerland.

== History ==
Bonfol is first mentioned in 1136 as Bunfol. The municipality was formerly known by its German name Pumpfel, however, that name is no longer used. According to tradition, the village was founded after the Burgundian Wars for Stephan of Hagenbach, a vassal of Charles the Bold, to replace his destroyed villages of Bonfol-le-Vieux, Trunchéré and Vareroille.

During World War I from 1914 until 1918, the Western Front between the Allies and Germany began at the village of Le Largin in Bonfol. On 1 January 2024, Bonfol merged with Beurnevésin to form the new municipality of Basse-Vendline.

== Geography ==
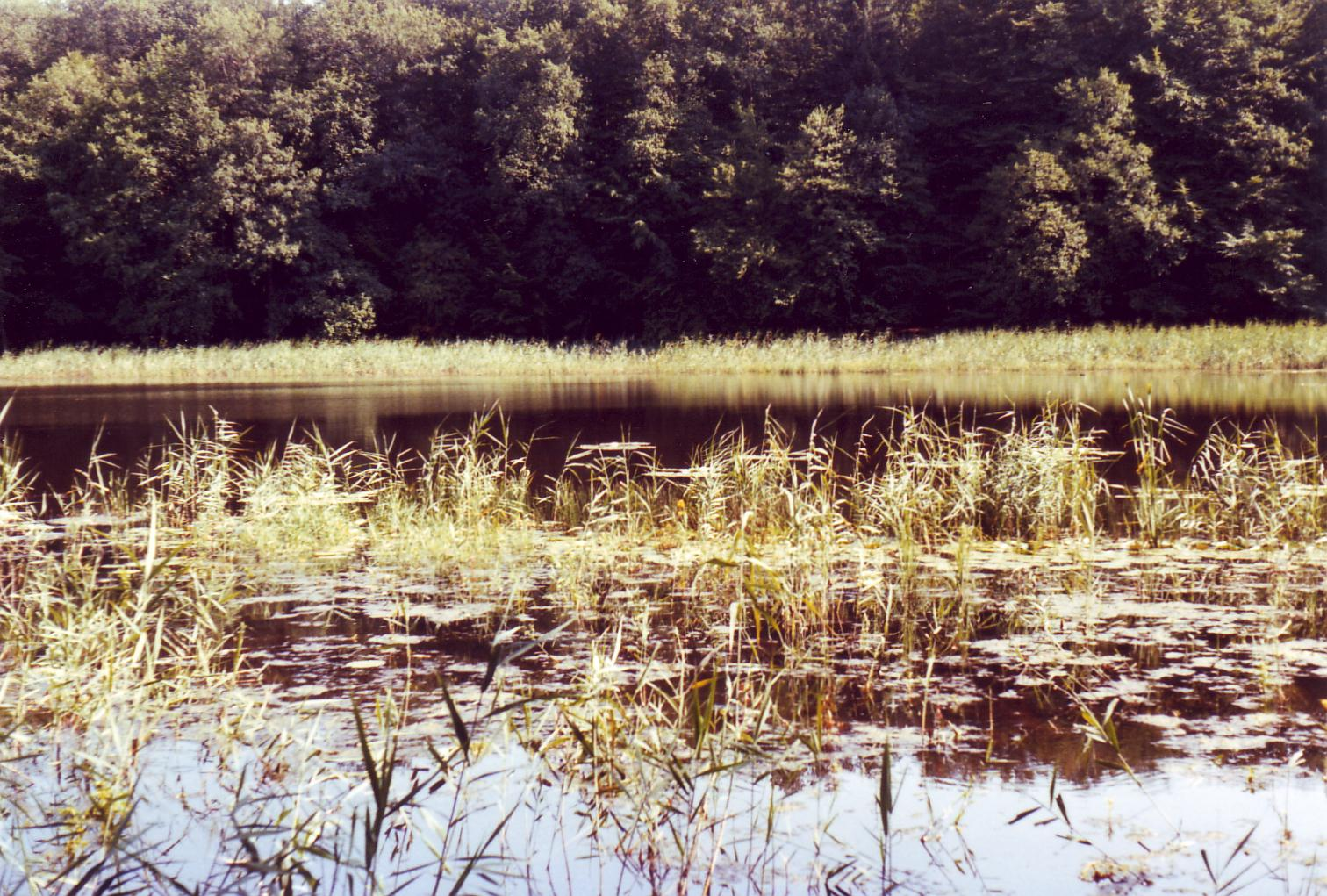
Etangs de Bonfol

Aerial view (1950)

Bonfol has an area of 13.58 km^{2} (5.24 sq mi). Of this area, 6.4 km^{2} (2.5 mi^{2}) or 47.2% is used for agricultural purposes, while 5.96 km^{2} (2.30 mi^{2}) or 43.9% is forested. Of the rest of the land, 0.94 km^{2} (0.36 mi^{2}) or 6.9% is settled (buildings or roads), 0.2 km^{2} (0.077 mi^{2}) or 1.5% is either rivers or lakes and 0.07 km^{2} (17 acres) or 0.5% is unproductive land.

Of the built up area, housing and buildings made up 2.9% and transportation infrastructure made up 2.3%. Out of the forested land, all of the forested land area is covered with heavy forests. Of the agricultural land, 35.4% is used for growing crops and 11.6% is pastures. All the water in the municipality is in lakes.

The municipality is located in the Porrentruy district, in the north-east corner of the Ajoie region on the border with France.

The nature preserve Etangs de Bonfol is located close to the village.

== Bonfol waste dump ==
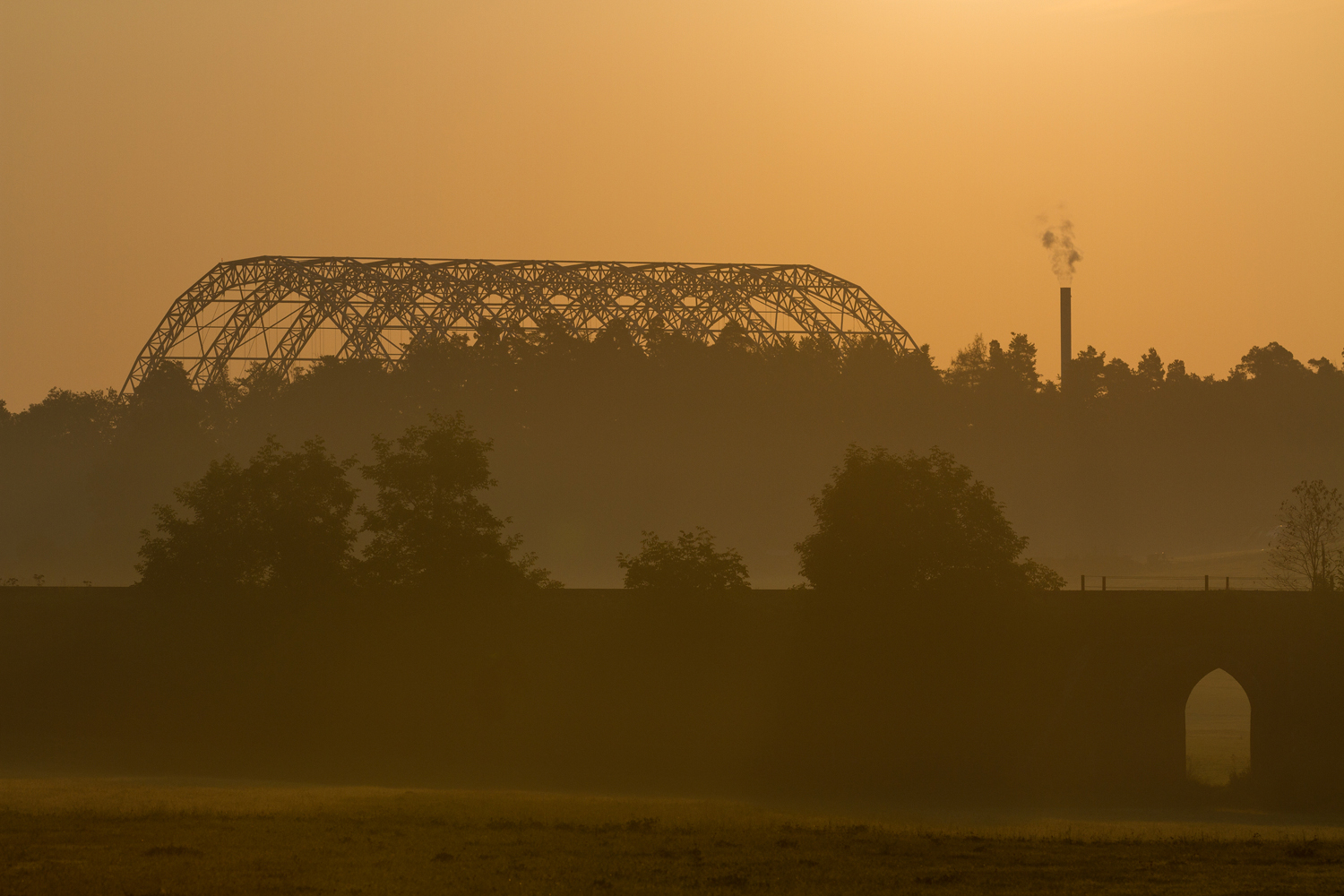
Excavation hall over the waste dump

Beginning in 1961 many of the largest pharmaceutical and chemical companies in and around Basel began burying chemical waste in a former clay mine outside the village. Eight of the largest, including BASF, Novartis, Roche and Syngenta, formed Basler Chemischen Industrie (BCI) to administer the site. The Bonfol dump remained in operation until 1976 and over those fifteen years about 114,000 tonnes (112,000 long tons; 126,000 short tons) of chemicals were dumped. After it was closed BCI believed the clay would hold the waste in place. The dump was buried and the 20,000 square meters (4.9 acres) of land that it covered was replanted. However, in 1981 the first leaks were detected from the dump and from 1986 through 1995 BCI installed a drainage system and built a runoff treatment plant. After protests by Greenpeace and the passage of Switzerland’s Federal Ordinance on the Contaminated Sites in 1998, on 17 October 2000 BCI signed an agreement with the Canton to fully excavate and clean the entire dump.

In 2007 construction began on an excavation hall that covered the entire site. Using a large overhead crane and digging bucket up to 160 tonnes (160 long tons; 180 short tons) of contaminated earth was excavated per day. It was then loaded on sealed rail cars and taken to incinerators in Germany where it was burned at temperatures up to 1,200 °C (2,190 °F) and turned into chemically stable ash. In July 2010 some of the chemicals in the dump exploded during excavation. One machinist suffered minor injuries and the project paused for several months to evaluate the hazard. At the end of August 2016 the last of the contaminated soil was removed, bringing the total removed and incinerated to 202,200 tonnes (199,000 long tons; 222,900 short tons). The project cost BCI a total of SFr 380 million.

== Coat of arms ==
The blazon of the municipal coat of arms is Argent, a Bend Azure and in chief sinister a Mullet of five of the same.

== Demographics ==
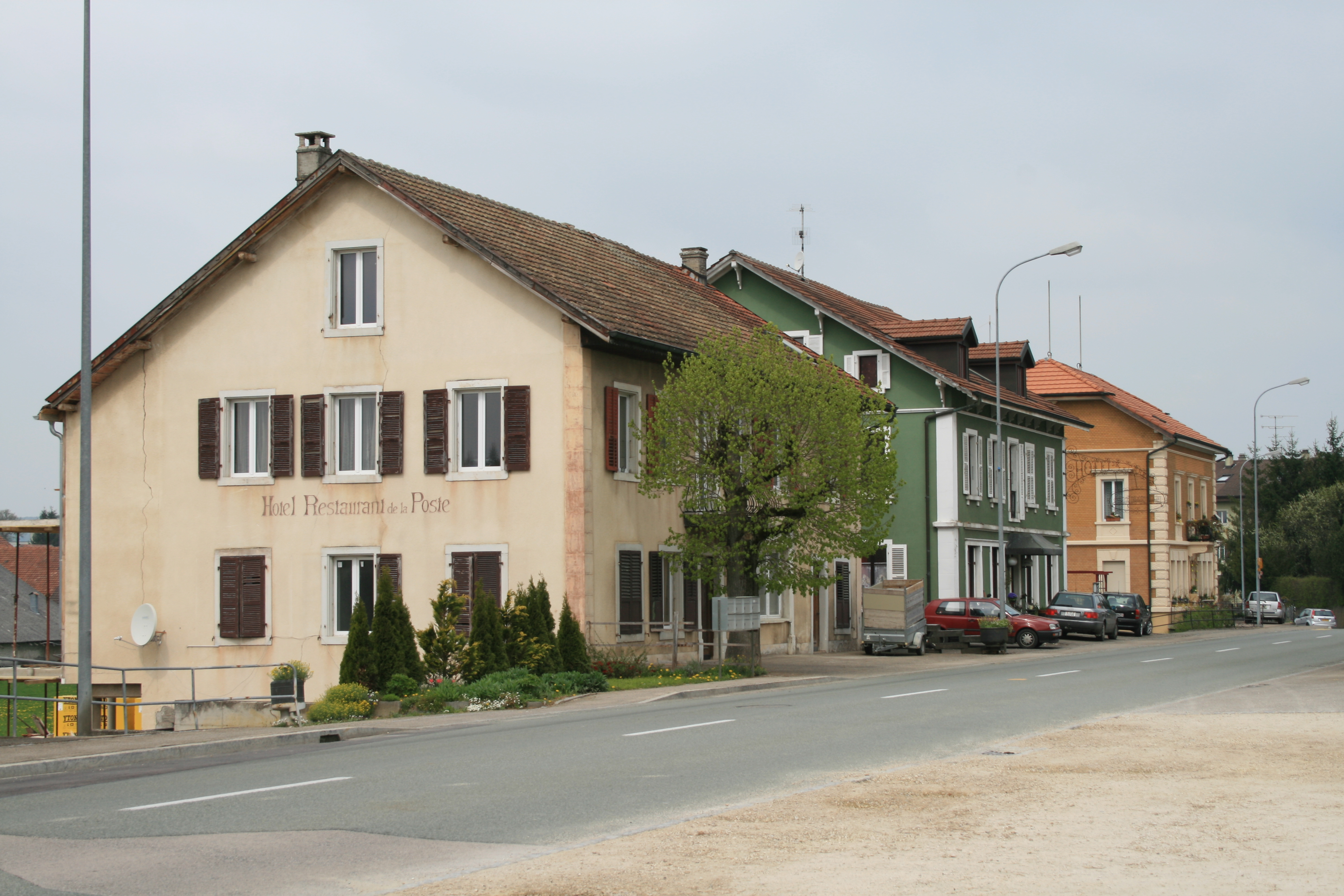
Houses in Bonfol village

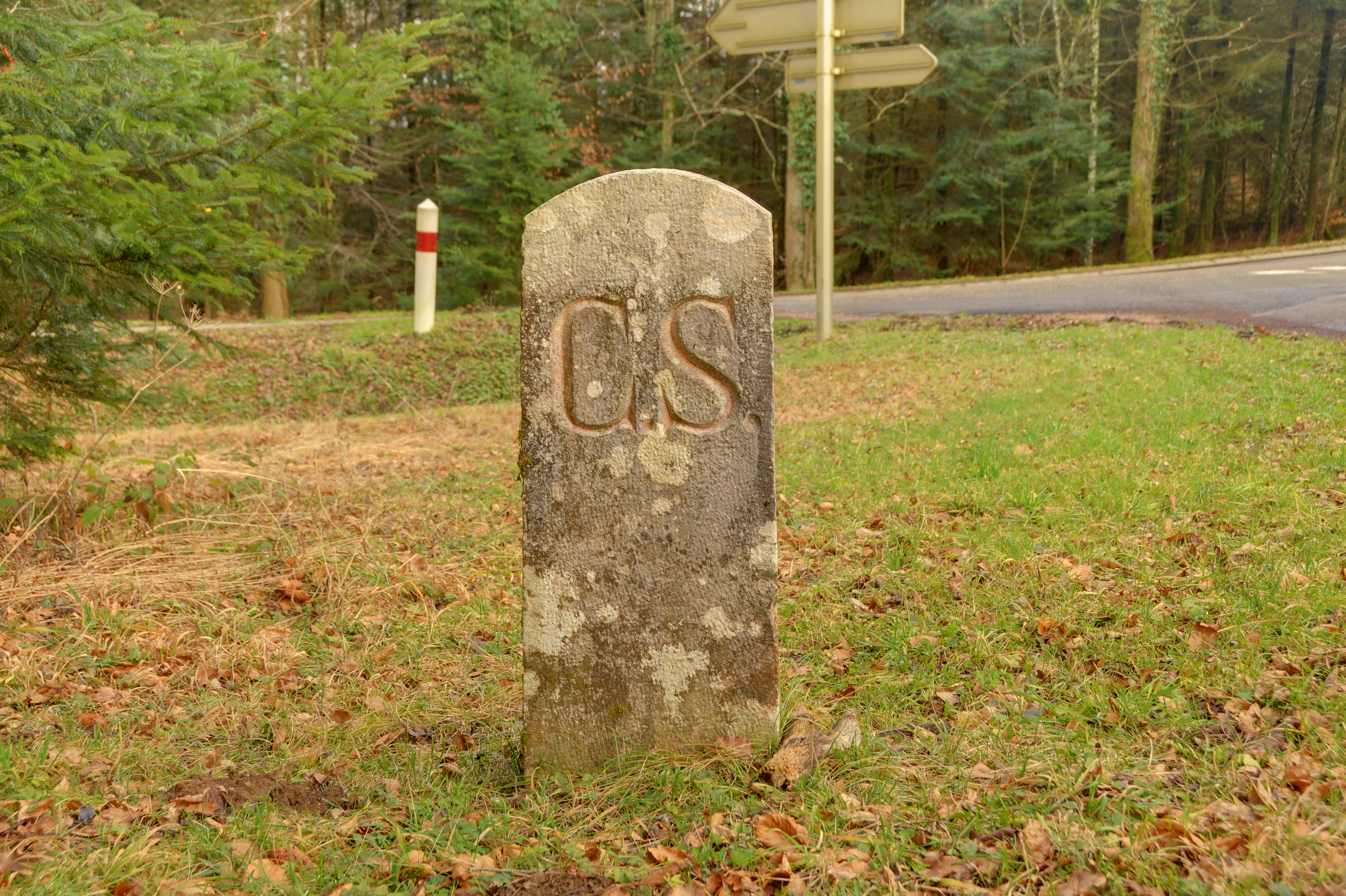
Marker stone on the Swiss-French border

Bonfol has a population (as of December 2020) of 663. As of 2008, 7.0% of the population are resident foreign nationals. Over the last 10 years (2000–2010) the population has changed at a rate of -6%. Migration accounted for 0.8%, while births and deaths accounted for -6.6%.

Most of the population (as of 2000) speaks French (575 or 84.7%) as their first language, German is the second most common (83 or 12.2%) and Spanish is the third (11 or 1.6%). There are 4 people who speak Italian.

As of 2008, the population was 47.5% male and 52.5% female. The population was made up of 293 Swiss men (42.8% of the population) and 32 (4.7%) non-Swiss men. There were 338 Swiss women (49.4%) and 21 (3.1%) non-Swiss women. Of the population in the municipality, 283 or about 41.7% were born in Bonfol and lived there in 2000. There were 149 or 21.9% who were born in the same canton, while 110 or 16.2% were born somewhere else in Switzerland, and 105 or 15.5% were born outside of Switzerland.

As of 2000, children and teenagers (0–19 years old) make up 19.6% of the population, while adults (20–64 years old) make up 55.5% and seniors (over 64 years old) make up 24.9%.

As of 2000, there were 217 people who were single and never married in the municipality. There were 353 married individuals, 72 widows or widowers and 37 individuals who are divorced.

As of 2000, there were 303 private households in the municipality, and an average of 2.2 persons per household. There were 103 households that consist of only one person and 16 households with five or more people. In 2000, a total of 296 apartments (76.3% of the total) were permanently occupied, while 46 apartments (11.9%) were seasonally occupied and 46 apartments (11.9%) were empty. The vacancy rate for the municipality, in 2010, was 8.56%.

The historical population is given in the following chart:

== Politics ==
In the 2007 federal election the most popular party was the FDP which received 26.89% of the vote. The next three most popular parties were the SPS (25.21%), the SVP (23.74%) and the CVP (21.43%). In the federal election, a total of 250 votes were cast, and the voter turnout was 43.6%.

== Economy ==
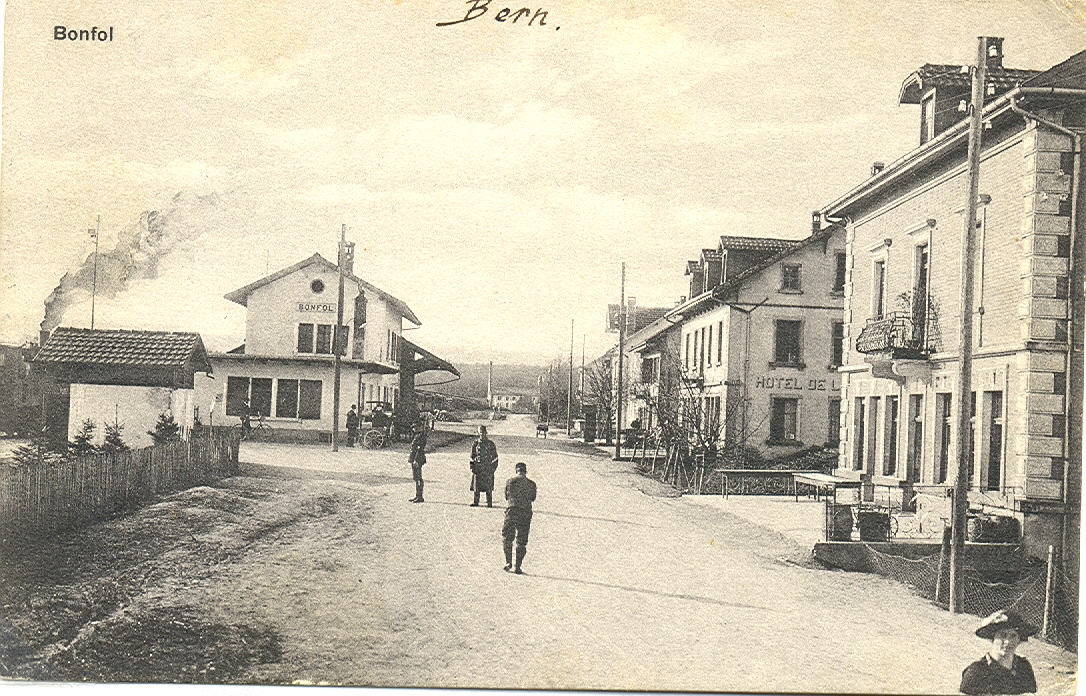
Bonfol rail station in 1910

As of 2010, Bonfol had an unemployment rate of 6.1%. As of 2008, there were 41 people employed in the primary economic sector and about 17 businesses involved in this sector. 145 people were employed in the secondary sector and there were 11 businesses in this sector. 73 people were employed in the tertiary sector, with 18 businesses in this sector. There were 305 residents of the municipality who were employed in some capacity, of which females made up 43.6% of the workforce.

In 2008 the total number of full-time equivalent jobs was 221. The number of jobs in the primary sector was 32, of which 31 were in agriculture and 1 was in forestry or lumber production. The number of jobs in the secondary sector was 135 of which 131 or (97.0%) were in manufacturing and 4 (3.0%) were in construction. The number of jobs in the tertiary sector was 54. In the tertiary sector; 12 or 22.2% were in wholesale or retail sales or the repair of motor vehicles, 5 or 9.3% were in the movement and storage of goods, 4 or 7.4% were in a hotel or restaurant, 1 was the insurance or financial industry, 3 or 5.6% were in education and 3 or 5.6% were in health care.

In 2000, there were 134 workers who commuted into the municipality and 150 workers who commuted away. The municipality is a net exporter of workers, with about 1.1 workers leaving the municipality for every one entering. About 19.4% of the workforce coming into Bonfol are coming from outside Switzerland. Of the working population, 6.2% used public transportation to get to work, and 55.1% used a private car.

== Religion ==
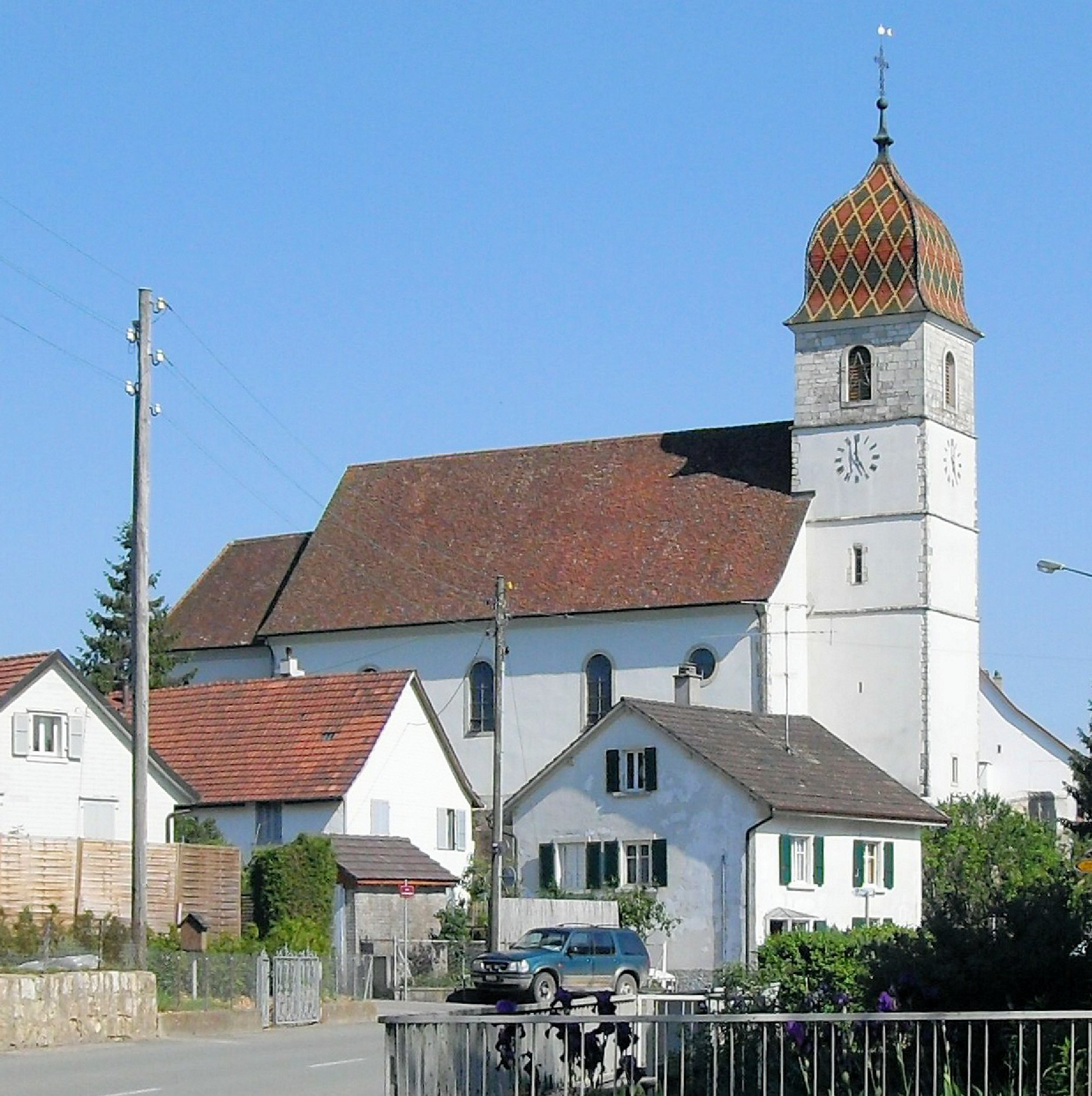
Bonfol village church

From the 2000 census, 447 or 65.8% were Roman Catholic, while 133 or 19.6% belonged to the Swiss Reformed Church. Of the rest of the population, there were 2 members of an Orthodox church (or about 0.29% of the population), there were 3 individuals (or about 0.44% of the population) who belonged to the Christian Catholic Church, and there were 44 individuals (or about 6.48% of the population) who belonged to another Christian church. There was 1 individual who was Islamic. There was 1 person who was Buddhist and 2 individuals who were Hindu. 31 (or about 4.57% of the population) belonged to no church, are agnostic or atheist, and 35 individuals (or about 5.15% of the population) did not answer the question.

== Education ==
In Bonfol about 180 or (26.5%) of the population have completed non-mandatory upper secondary education, and 36 or (5.3%) have completed additional higher education (either university or a Fachhochschule). Of the 36 who completed tertiary schooling, 58.3% were Swiss men, 38.9% were Swiss women.

The Canton of Jura school system provides two year of non-obligatory Kindergarten, followed by six years of Primary school. This is followed by three years of obligatory lower Secondary school where the students are separated according to ability and aptitude. Following the lower Secondary students may attend a three or four year optional upper Secondary school followed by some form of Tertiary school or they may enter an apprenticeship.

During the 2009-10 school year, there were a total of 34 students attending 3 classes in Bonfol. There were no kindergarten classes in the municipality. The municipality had 2.5 primary classes and 34 students. There are only nine Secondary schools in the canton, so all the students from Bonfol attend their secondary school in another municipality.

As of 2000, there were 45 students from Bonfol who attended schools outside the municipality.

== Transportation ==
Bonfol is located at the northern end of the Porrentruy–Bonfol railway line and has regular service at the Bonfol railway station.
