= Etangs de Bonfol =

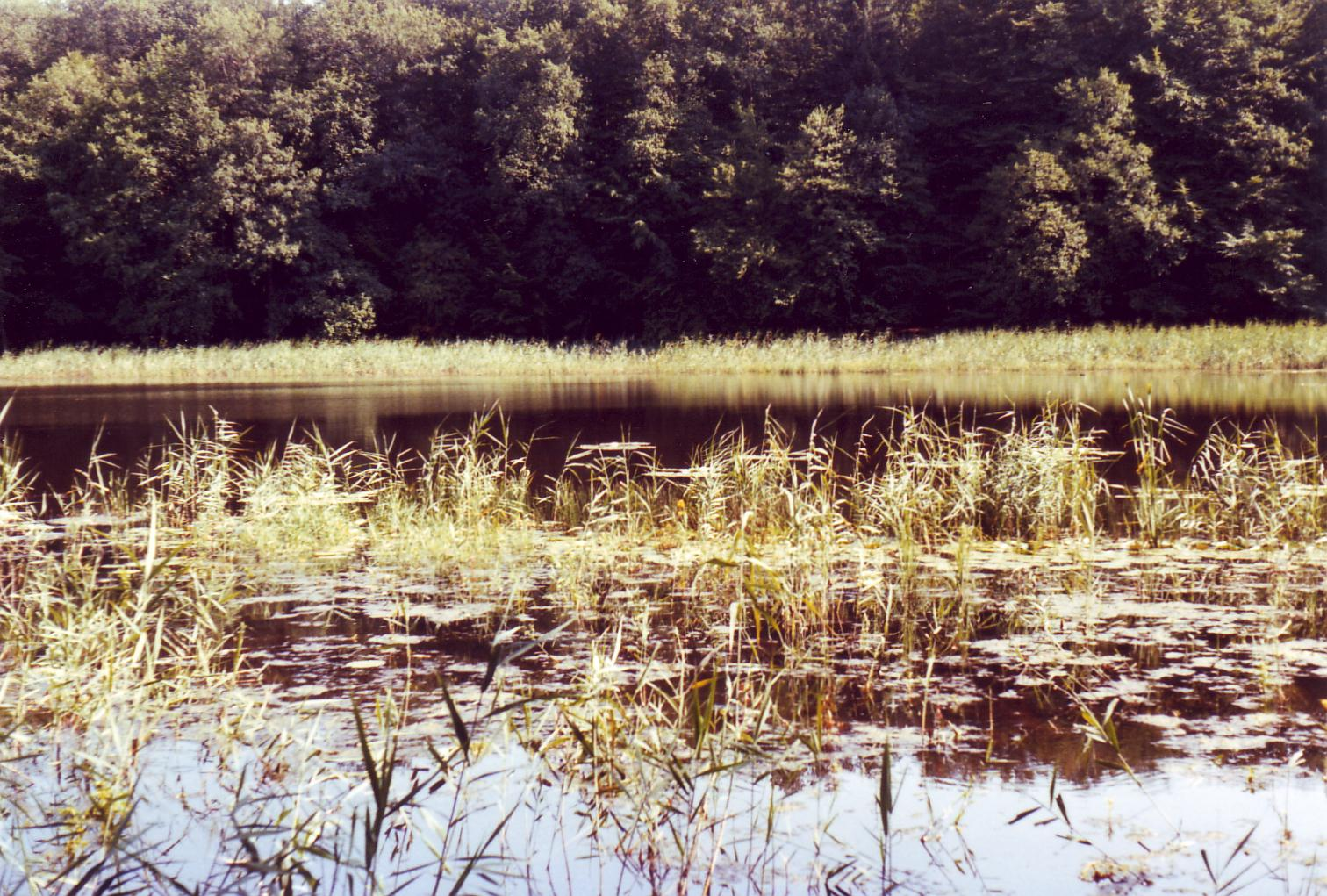

- Location within Canton of Jura Location within Switzerland Location within Alps
- Interactive map of Etangs de Bonfol
- Location: Bonfol, Canton of Jura
- Coordinates: 47°28′13″N 7°9′48″E
- Type: reservoir
- Basin countries: Switzerland

Etangs de Bonfol are a series of ponds at Bonfol in the Canton of Jura, Switzerland. The main ponds are named "étang du Milieu" and "Neuf-Etang". They are separated by a dam.

Since 1962, the étangs de Bonfol are a nature preserve. They are listed in the Federal Inventory of Amphibian Spawning Areas (2001), and, together with the étang at Vendlincourt, in the Federal Inventory of Landscapes and Natural Monuments (1977).

The ponds were developed by bishop of Basel for fishing.
