= Alle, Switzerland =

Alle
- Municipality
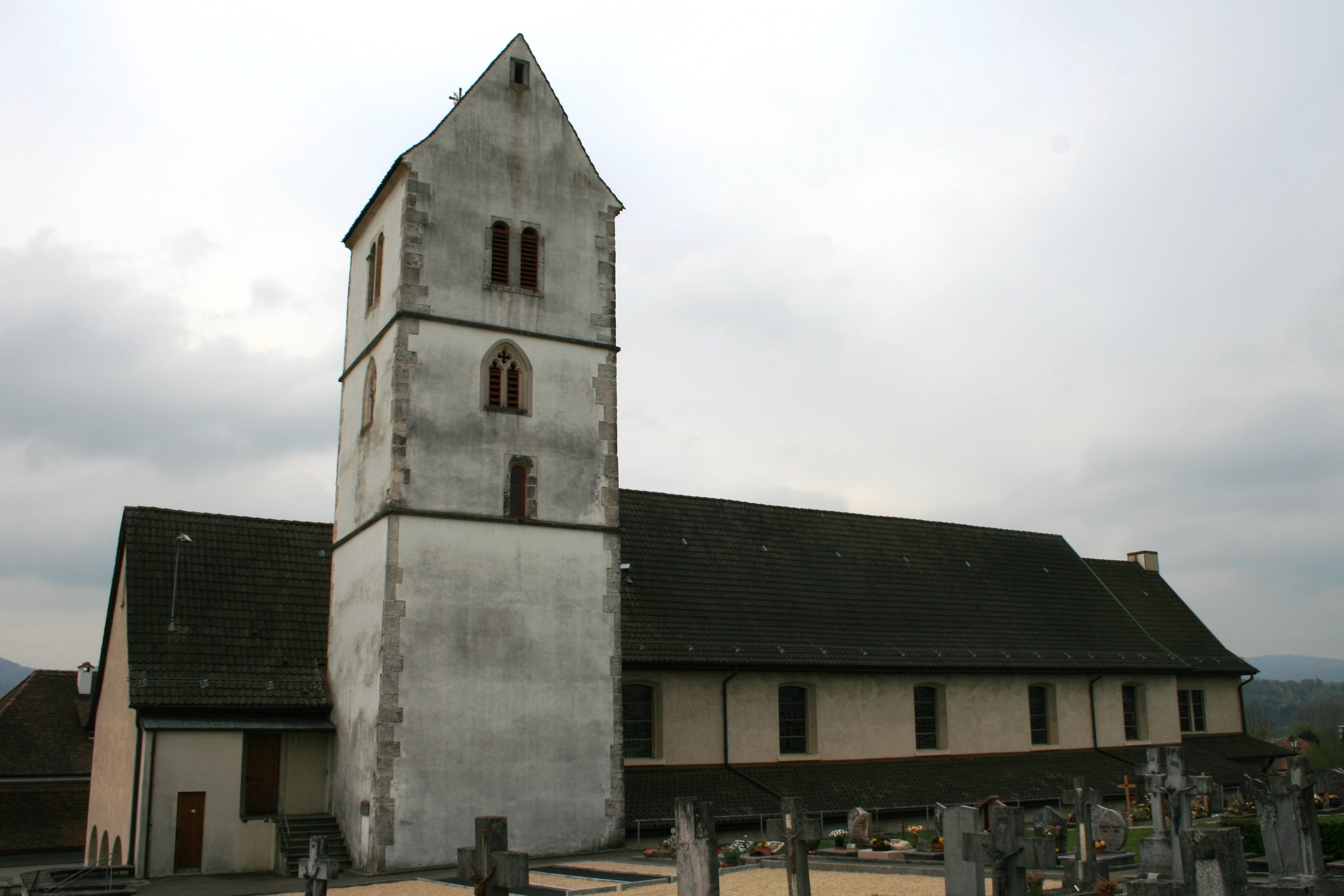
- Alle village church, Saint Jean Baptiste Church

- Flag Coat of arms
- Location of Alle
- Location within Switzerland Location within Canton of Jura
- Coordinates: 47°26′N 07°08′E
- Country: Switzerland
- Canton: Jura
- District: Porrentruy

Government
  - Executive: Conseil communal with 7 members
  - Mayor: Maire; Claude Vanhoutéghem (as of 2026)

Area
  - Total: 10.66 km^{2} (4.12 sq mi)
- Elevation: 450 m (1,480 ft)

Population (2003)
  - Total: 1,644
  - Density: 154.2/km^{2} (399.4/sq mi)
- Time zone: UTC+01:00 (CET)
  - Summer (DST): UTC+02:00 (CEST)
- Postal code: 2942
- SFOS number: 6771
- ISO 3166 code: CH-JU
- Surrounded by: Cornol, Courgenay, Porrentruy, Coeuve, Vendlincourt, Miécourt.
- Website: www.alle.ch

Alle (French pronunciation: [al]; Franc-Comtois: Alle) is a municipality in the district of Porrentruy of the canton of Jura in Switzerland.

== History ==
Aerial view (1950)

Alle is first mentioned in 1136 as Alla. The municipality was formerly known by its German name Hall, however, that name is no longer used.

== Geography ==
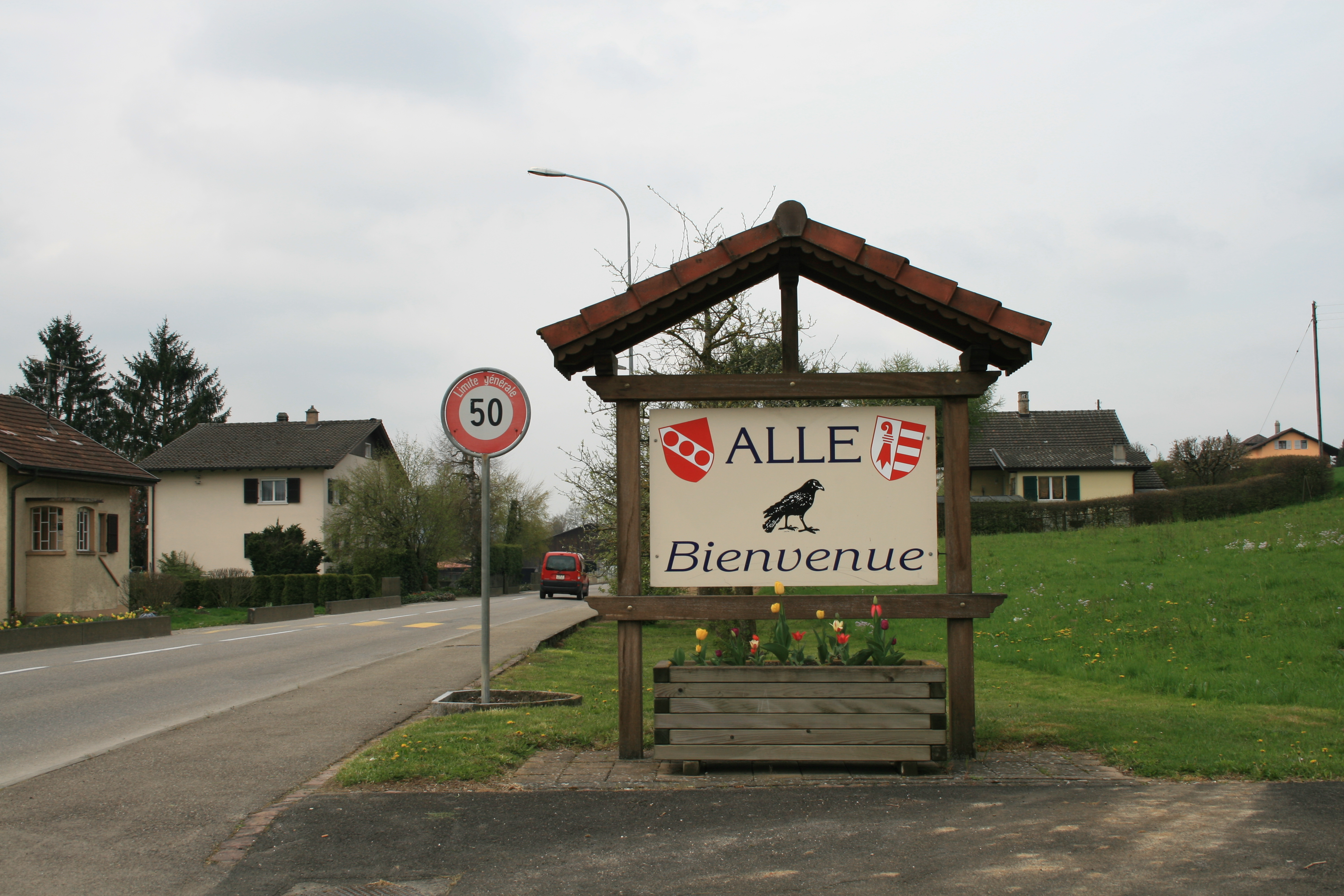
Village entrance into Alle

Alle has an area of 10.6 km^{2} (4.09 sq mi). Of this area, 6.81 km^{2} (2.63 mi^{2}) or 64.2% is used for agricultural purposes, while 2.36 km^{2} (0.91 mi^{2}) or 22.3% is forested. Of the rest of the land, 1.37 km^{2} (0.53 mi^{2}) or 12.9% is settled (buildings or roads), 0.08 km^{2} (20 acres) or 0.8% is either rivers or lakes and 0.01 km^{2} (2.5 acres) or 0.1% is unproductive land.

Of the built up area, industrial buildings made up 1.1% of the total area while housing and buildings made up 6.8% and transportation infrastructure made up 4.3%. Out of the forested land, 21.0% of the total land area is heavily forested and 1.2% is covered with orchards or small clusters of trees. Of the agricultural land, 50.0% is used for growing crops and 13.6% is pastures. All the water in the municipality is flowing water.

The municipality is located in the Porrentruy district, along the Allaine and Cornolbach rivers. It is one of the largest villages in the Ajoie, with distinctive row houses from the 17th and 18th centuries along the rivers.

== Coat of arms ==
The blazon of the municipal coat of arms is Gules, on a Bend Argent three Torteaux.

== Demographics ==
Alle has a population (as of December 2020) of 1,895. As of 2008, 10.8% of the population are resident foreign nationals. Over the last 10 years (2000–2010) the population has changed at a rate of 8.6%. Migration accounted for 7.6%, while births and deaths accounted for 1.7%.

Most of the population (as of 2000) speaks French (1,436 or 93.1%) as their first language, Italian is the second most common (45 or 2.9%) and German is the third (24 or 1.6%).

As of 2008, the population was 48.4% male and 51.6% female. The population was made up of 726 Swiss men (42.6% of the population) and 99 (5.8%) non-Swiss men. There were 801 Swiss women (47.0%) and 77 (4.5%) non-Swiss women. Of the population in the municipality, 659 or about 42.7% were born in Alle and lived there in 2000. There were 500 or 32.4% who were born in the same canton, while 110 or 7.1% were born somewhere else in Switzerland, and 243 or 15.8% were born outside of Switzerland.

As of 2000, children and teenagers (0–19 years old) make up 26.3% of the population, while adults (20–64 years old) make up 57.5% and seniors (over 64 years old) make up 16.1%.

As of 2000, there were 580 people who were single and never married in the municipality. There were 795 married individuals, 113 widows or widowers and 54 individuals who are divorced.

As of 2000, there were 612 private households in the municipality, and an average of 2.5 persons per household. There were 179 households that consist of only one person and 59 households with five or more people. In 2000, a total of 593 apartments (91.1% of the total) were permanently occupied, while 29 apartments (4.5%) were seasonally occupied and 29 apartments (4.5%) were empty. As of 2009, the construction rate of new housing units was 4.1 new units per 1000 residents. The vacancy rate for the municipality, in 2010, was 2.6%.

The historical population is given in the following chart:

== Heritage sites of national significance ==
The Noir Bois, a Paleolithic and medieval settlement and the Pré Monsieur Paleolithic settlement are listed as Swiss heritage site of national significance. The entire urban village of Alle is part of the Inventory of Swiss Heritage Sites.

== Politics ==
In the 2007 federal election the most popular party was the CVP which received 45.39% of the vote. The next three most popular parties were the FDP (19.78%), the SPS (18.54%) and the SVP (10.97%). In the federal election, a total of 614 votes were cast, and the voter turnout was 52.6%.

== Economy ==
As of 2010, Alle had an unemployment rate of 4.4%. As of 2008, there were 62 people employed in the primary economic sector and about 18 businesses involved in this sector. 810 people were employed in the secondary sector and there were 26 businesses in this sector. 274 people were employed in the tertiary sector, with 55 businesses in this sector. There were 755 residents of the municipality who were employed in some capacity, of which females made up 41.3% of the workforce.

In 2008 the total number of full-time equivalent jobs was 1,053. The number of jobs in the primary sector was 49, of which 39 were in agriculture and 10 were in forestry or lumber production. The number of jobs in the secondary sector was 781 of which 751 or (96.2%) were in manufacturing and 29 (3.7%) were in construction. The number of jobs in the tertiary sector was 223. In the tertiary sector; 118 or 52.9% were in wholesale or retail sales or the repair of motor vehicles, 22 or 9.9% were in the movement and storage of goods, 20 or 9.0% were in a hotel or restaurant, 8 or 3.6% were the insurance or financial industry, 3 or 1.3% were technical professionals or scientists, 14 or 6.3% were in education and 12 or 5.4% were in health care.

In 2000, there were 1,000 workers who commuted into the municipality and 412 workers who commuted away. The municipality is a net importer of workers, with about 2.4 workers entering the municipality for every one leaving. About 38.5% of the workforce coming into Alle are coming from outside Switzerland. Of the working population, 7% used public transportation to get to work, and 62.3% used a private car.

== Religion ==
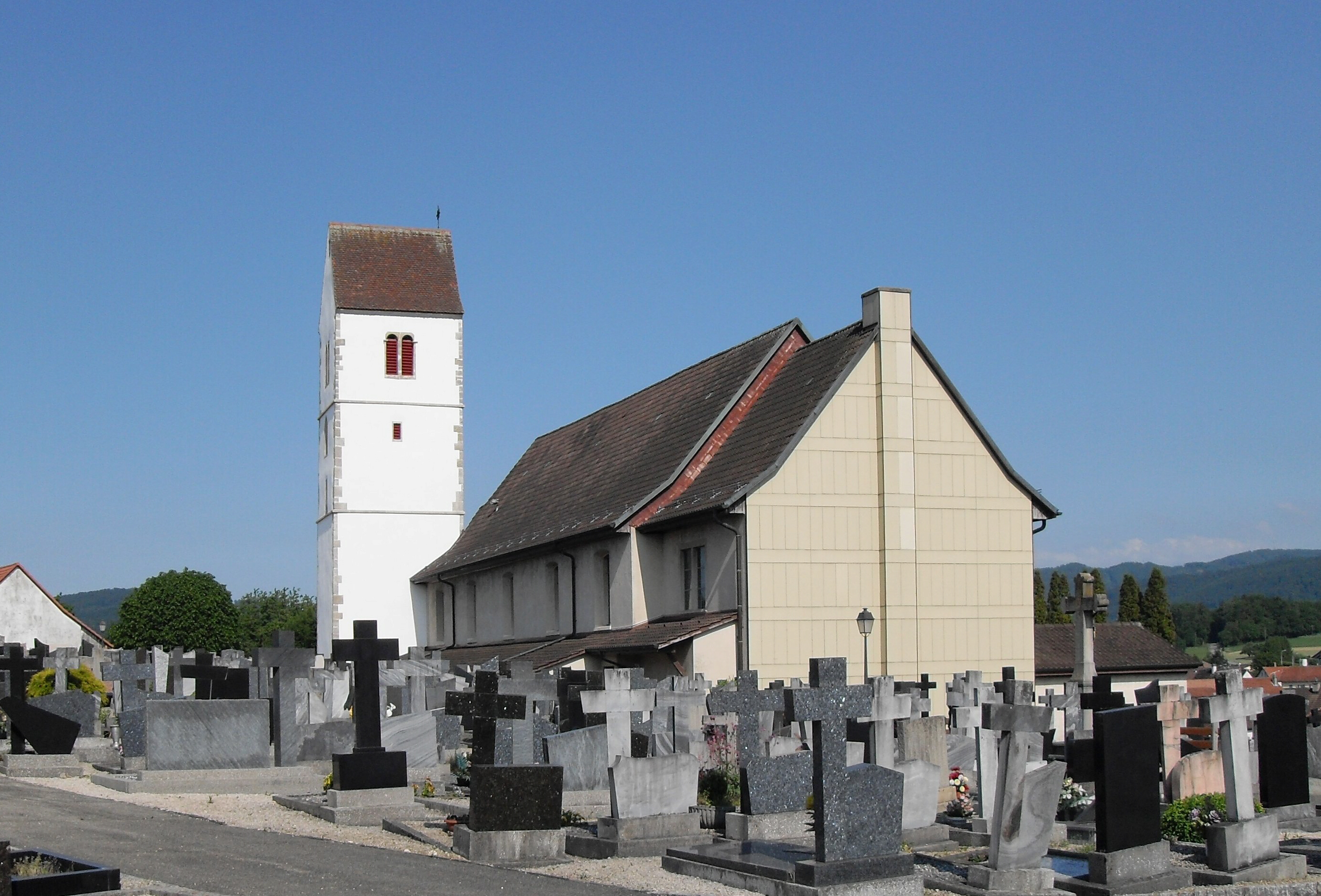
Saint Jean Baptiste church

From the 2000 census, 1,313 or 85.1% were Roman Catholic, while 94 or 6.1% belonged to the Swiss Reformed Church. Of the rest of the population, there were 2 individuals (or about 0.13% of the population) who belonged to the Christian Catholic Church, and there were 25 individuals (or about 1.62% of the population) who belonged to another Christian church. There was 1 individual who was Jewish, and 25 (or about 1.62% of the population) who were Islamic. There were 2 individuals who were Buddhist and 2 individuals who belonged to another church. 47 (or about 3.05% of the population) belonged to no church, are agnostic or atheist, and 43 individuals (or about 2.79% of the population) did not answer the question.

== Education ==
In Alle about 509 or (33.0%) of the population have completed non-mandatory upper secondary education, and 93 or (6.0%) have completed additional higher education (either university or a Fachhochschule). Of the 93 who completed tertiary schooling, 69.9% were Swiss men, 21.5% were Swiss women.

The Canton of Jura school system provides two year of non-obligatory Kindergarten, followed by six years of Primary school. This is followed by three years of obligatory lower Secondary school where the students are separated according to ability and aptitude. Following the lower Secondary students may attend a three or four year optional upper Secondary school followed by some form of Tertiary school or they may enter an apprenticeship.

During the 2009-10 school year, there were a total of 197 students attending 12 classes in Alle. There were 2.5 kindergarten classes with a total of 46 students in the municipality. The municipality had 9 primary classes and 151 students. There are only nine Secondary schools in the canton, so all the students from Alle attend their secondary school in another municipality.

As of 2000, there were 117 students from Alle who attended schools outside the municipality.

== Transportation ==
Alle is located on the Porrentruy–Bonfol railway line and has regular service at the Alle railway station.
