= Montignez =

- Former municipality
- Location of Montignez
- Location within Switzerland Location within Canton of Jura
- Coordinates: 47°29′N 07°03′E
- Country: Switzerland
- Canton: Jura
- District: Porrentruy

Government
  - Mayor: Maire

Area
  - Total: 5.8 km^{2} (2.2 sq mi)
- Elevation: 421 m (1,381 ft)

Population (2003)
  - Total: 252
  - Density: 43/km^{2} (110/sq mi)
- Time zone: UTC+01:00 (CET)
  - Summer (DST): UTC+02:00 (CEST)
- Postal code: 2924
- SFOS number: 826
- ISO 3166 code: CH-JU
- Surrounded by: Buix, Courtemaîche, Damphreux, Lugnez, Courcelles(F)
- Website: SFSO statistics

Montignez is a municipality in the district of Porrentruy in the canton of Jura in Switzerland.

Aerial view (1950)

On 1 January 2009 the former municipalities of Buix, Courtemaîche and Montignez merged to form the new municipality of Basse-Allaine.
