= Grandgourt railway station =

Former railway station in Switzerland

Grandgourt
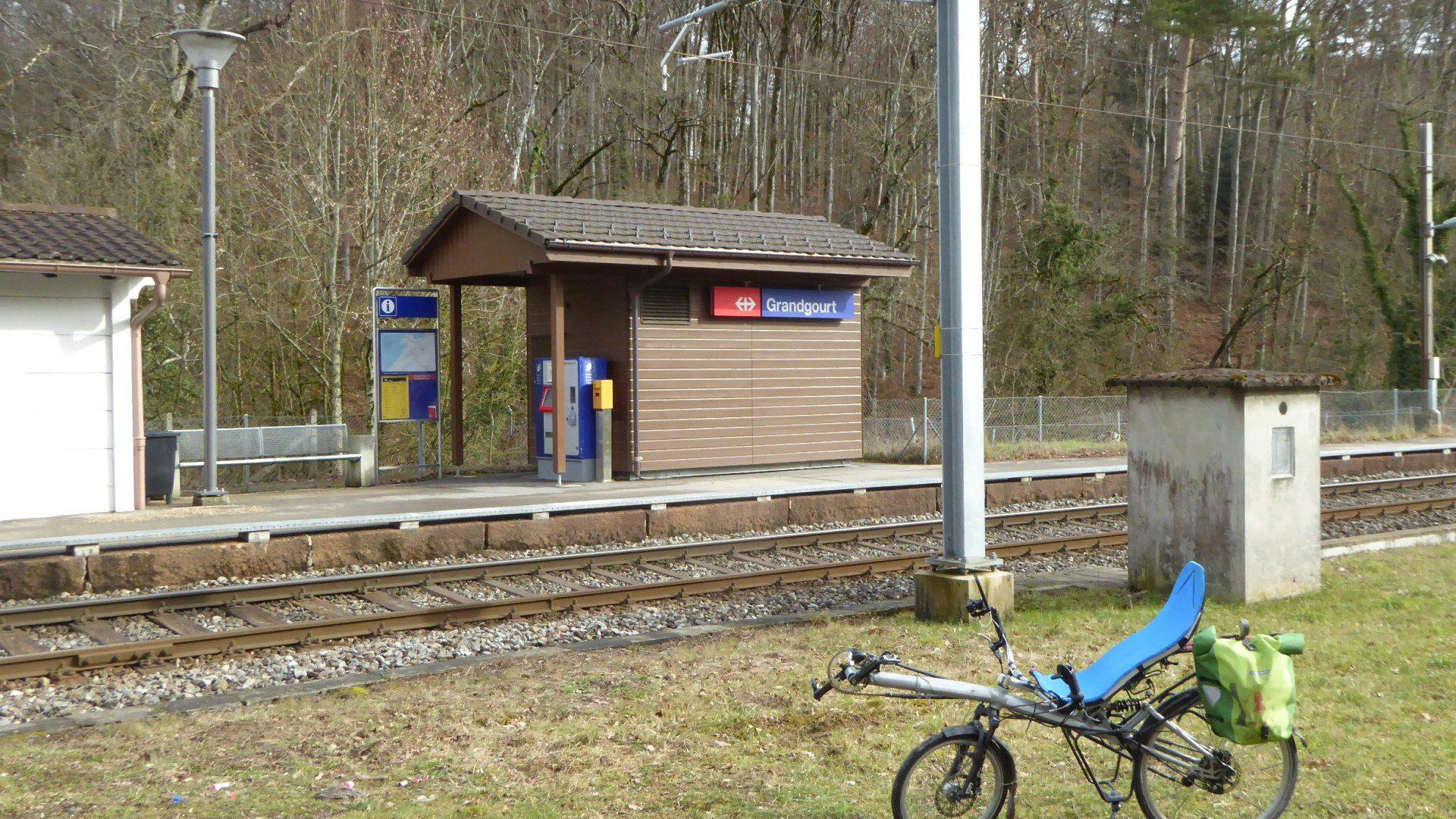
- The station platform in 2018

General information
- Location: Basse-Allaine; Switzerland
- Coordinates: 47°28′12″N 7°02′53″E
- Owner: Swiss Federal Railways
- Line: Delémont–Delle line
- Distance: 119.7 km (74.4 mi) from Olten

History
- Closed: 11 December 2022
Location
- Location within Switzerland Location within Canton of Jura

Grandgourt railway station (French: Gare de Grandgourt) was a railway station in the municipality of Basse-Allaine, in the Swiss canton of Jura. It is an intermediate stop on the standard gauge Delémont–Delle line of Swiss Federal Railways. The station closed with the December 2022 timetable change.
