= Vendlincourt =

- Municipality
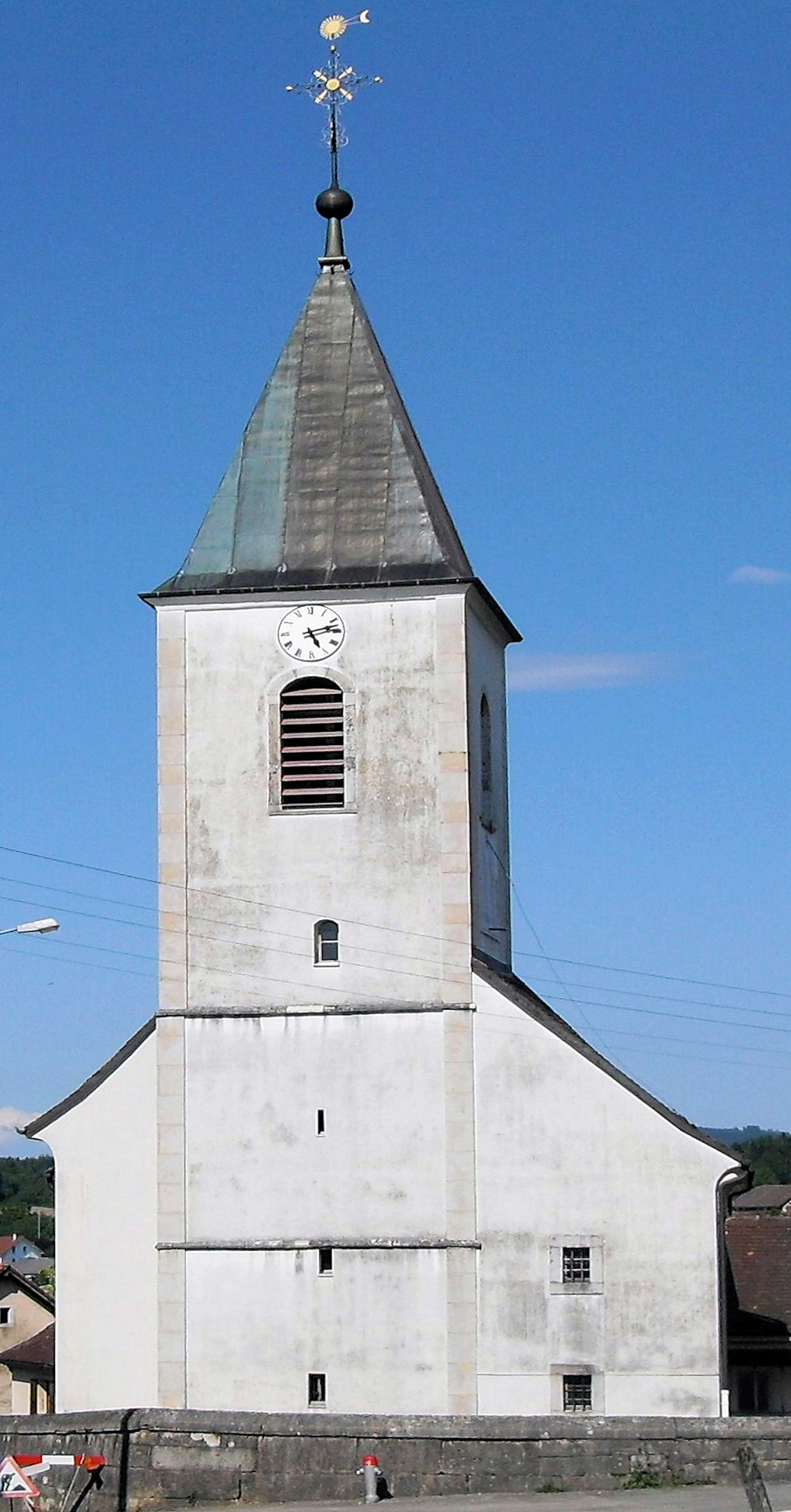
- Vendlincourt village church

- Coat of arms
- Location of Vendlincourt
- Location within Switzerland Location within Canton of Jura
- Coordinates: 47°27′N 07°09′E
- Country: Switzerland
- Canton: Jura
- District: Porrentruy

Government
  - Executive: Conseil communal with 5 members
  - Mayor: Maire; Anne Sulliger (as of 2026)

Area
  - Total: 9.14 km^{2} (3.53 sq mi)
- Elevation: 448 m (1,470 ft)

Population (2020)
  - Total: 560
  - Density: 61/km^{2} (160/sq mi)
- Time zone: UTC+01:00 (CET)
  - Summer (DST): UTC+02:00 (CEST)
- Postal code: 2943
- SFOS number: 6806
- ISO 3166 code: CH-JU
- Surrounded by: Bonfol, Damphreux, Coeuve, Alle, Miécourt, Levoncourt(F), Courtavon(F)
- Website: vendlincourt.ch

Vendlincourt (French pronunciation: [vɑ̃dlɛ̃kuʁ]) is a municipality in the district of Porrentruy in the canton of Jura in Switzerland.

== History ==
Aerial view (1950)

Vendlincourt is first mentioned in 1136 as Uuandeleincurt.

== Geography ==
Vendlincourt has an area of 9.15 km^{2} (3.53 sq mi). Of this area, 5.12 km^{2} (1.98 mi^{2}) or 55.8% is used for agricultural purposes, while 3.45 km^{2} (1.33 mi^{2}) or 37.6% is forested. Of the rest of the land, 0.59 km^{2} (0.23 mi^{2}) or 6.4% is settled (buildings or roads), 0.02 km^{2} (4.9 acres) or 0.2% is either rivers or lakes.

Of the built up area, housing and buildings made up 3.1% and transportation infrastructure made up 2.1%. Out of the forested land, all of the forested land area is covered with heavy forests. Of the agricultural land, 46.1% is used for growing crops and 8.8% is pastures. All the water in the municipality is in lakes.

The municipality is located in the Porrentruy district.

== Coat of arms ==
The blazon of the municipal coat of arms is Azure, a Fleur-de-lis in chief between a Saltire Or.

== Demographics ==
Vendlincourt has a population (as of December 2020) of 560. As of 2008, 7.6% of the population are resident foreign nationals. Over the last 10 years (2000–2010) the population has changed at a rate of -6%. Migration accounted for -6.9%, while births and deaths accounted for 1.7%.

Most of the population (as of 2000) speaks French (566 or 91.7%) as their first language, German is the second most common (28 or 4.5%) and Italian is the third (10 or 1.6%).

As of 2008, the population was 51.1% male and 48.9% female. The population was made up of 249 Swiss men (45.8% of the population) and 29 (5.3%) non-Swiss men. There were 249 Swiss women (45.8%) and 17 (3.1%) non-Swiss women. Of the population in the municipality, 269 or about 43.6% were born in Vendlincourt and lived there in 2000. There were 122 or 19.8% who were born in the same canton, while 54 or 8.8% were born somewhere else in Switzerland, and 74 or 12.0% were born outside of Switzerland.

As of 2000, children and teenagers (0–19 years old) make up 25.3% of the population, while adults (20–64 years old) make up 54% and seniors (over 64 years old) make up 20.7%.

As of 2000, there were 241 people who were single and never married in the municipality. There were 309 married individuals, 39 widows or widowers and 28 individuals who are divorced.

As of 2000, there were 214 private households in the municipality, and an average of 2.5 persons per household. There were 67 households that consist of only one person and 23 households with five or more people. In 2000, a total of 207 apartments (80.5% of the total) were permanently occupied, while 29 apartments (11.3%) were seasonally occupied and 21 apartments (8.2%) were empty. As of 2009, the construction rate of new housing units was 3.7 new units per 1000 residents. The vacancy rate for the municipality, in 2010, was 6.3%.

The historical population is given in the following chart:

== Politics ==
In the 2007 federal election the most popular party was the CVP which received 31.86% of the vote. The next three most popular parties were the SVP (22.71%), the SPS (21.53%) and the FDP (18.29%). In the federal election, a total of 172 votes were cast, and the voter turnout was 39.5%.

== Economy ==
As of 2010, Vendlincourt had an unemployment rate of 2.8%. As of 2008, there were 30 people employed in the primary economic sector and about 11 businesses involved in this sector. 139 people were employed in the secondary sector and there were 10 businesses in this sector. 35 people were employed in the tertiary sector, with 16 businesses in this sector. There were 280 residents of the municipality who were employed in some capacity, of which females made up 45.0% of the workforce.

In 2008 the total number of full-time equivalent jobs was 181. The number of jobs in the primary sector was 25, of which 22 were in agriculture and 3 were in forestry or lumber production. The number of jobs in the secondary sector was 132 of which 109 or (82.6%) were in manufacturing and 23 (17.4%) were in construction. The number of jobs in the tertiary sector was 24. In the tertiary sector; 5 or 20.8% were in wholesale or retail sales or the repair of motor vehicles, 2 or 8.3% were in the movement and storage of goods, 8 or 33.3% were in a hotel or restaurant, 1 was in the information industry, and 1 was a technical professional or scientist.

In 2000, there were 140 workers who commuted into the municipality and 154 workers who commuted away. The municipality is a net exporter of workers, with about 1.1 workers leaving the municipality for every one entering. About 26.4% of the workforce coming into Vendlincourt are coming from outside Switzerland. Of the working population, 7.1% used public transportation to get to work, and 57.5% used a private car.

== Religion ==
From the 2000 census, 369 or 59.8% were Roman Catholic, while 64 or 10.4% belonged to the Swiss Reformed Church. Of the rest of the population, there were 8 members of an Orthodox church (or about 1.30% of the population), and there were 55 individuals (or about 8.91% of the population) who belonged to another Christian church. There were 4 (or about 0.65% of the population) who were Islamic. 11 (or about 1.78% of the population) belonged to no church, are agnostic or atheist, and 133 individuals (or about 21.56% of the population) did not answer the question.

== Education ==
In Vendlincourt about 155 or (25.1%) of the population have completed non-mandatory upper secondary education, and 33 or (5.3%) have completed additional higher education (either university or a Fachhochschule). Of the 33 who completed tertiary schooling, 54.5% were Swiss men, 27.3% were Swiss women.

The Canton of Jura school system provides two year of non-obligatory Kindergarten, followed by six years of Primary school. This is followed by three years of obligatory lower Secondary school where the students are separated according to ability and aptitude. Following the lower Secondary students may attend a three or four year optional upper Secondary school followed by some form of Tertiary school or they may enter an apprenticeship.

During the 2009–10 school year, there were a total of 44 students attending 3 classes in Vendlincourt. There were no kindergarten classes in the municipality. The municipality had 3 primary classes and 44 students. There are only nine Secondary schools in the canton, so all the students from Vendlincourt attend their secondary school in another municipality.

As of 2000, there were 7 students in Vendlincourt who came from another municipality, while 34 residents attended schools outside the municipality.

== Transportation ==
Vendlincourt is located on the Porrentruy–Bonfol railway line and has regular service at the Vendlincourt railway station.
