= Basse-Vendline =

Municipality in northern Switzerland

- Municipality
- Flag Coat of arms
- Location of Basse-Vendline
- Location within Switzerland Location within Canton of Jura
- Coordinates: 47°29′13″N 7°8′29″E
- Country: Switzerland
- Canton: Jura
- District: Porrentruy

Government
  - Executive: Conseil communal with 7 members
  - Mayor: Maire; John Moser (as of 2026)

Area
  - Total: 18.67 km^{2} (7.21 sq mi)
- Elevation: 534 m (1,752 ft)

Population (2021)
  - Total: 782
  - Density: 41.9/km^{2} (108/sq mi)
- Time zone: UTC+01:00 (CET)
  - Summer (DST): UTC+02:00 (CEST)
- Postal codes: 2935; 2944
- SFOS number: 6812
- ISO 3166 code: CH-JU
- Website: https://www.basse-vendline.ch/

Basse-Vendline is a municipality in the district of Porrentruy in the canton of Jura in Switzerland. It was established on 1 January 2024 with the merger of the municipalities of Beurnevésin and Bonfol.

== Toponymy ==
The municipality takes its name from the Vendline, a river that crosses the villages of Beurnevésin and Bonfol.

== History ==
Beurnevésin was first mentioned in 1270 as Brunnevisin, while Bonfol was first mentioned in 1136 as Bunfol. These two municipalities were formerly known their its German names Brischwiler and Pumpfel, respectively; however, these names are no longer used. On 1 January 2024, Beurnevésin and Bonfol merged to form the new municipality of Basse-Vendline.

== Demographics ==
The historical population is given in the following chart:
