= Courtemaîche =

- Former municipality
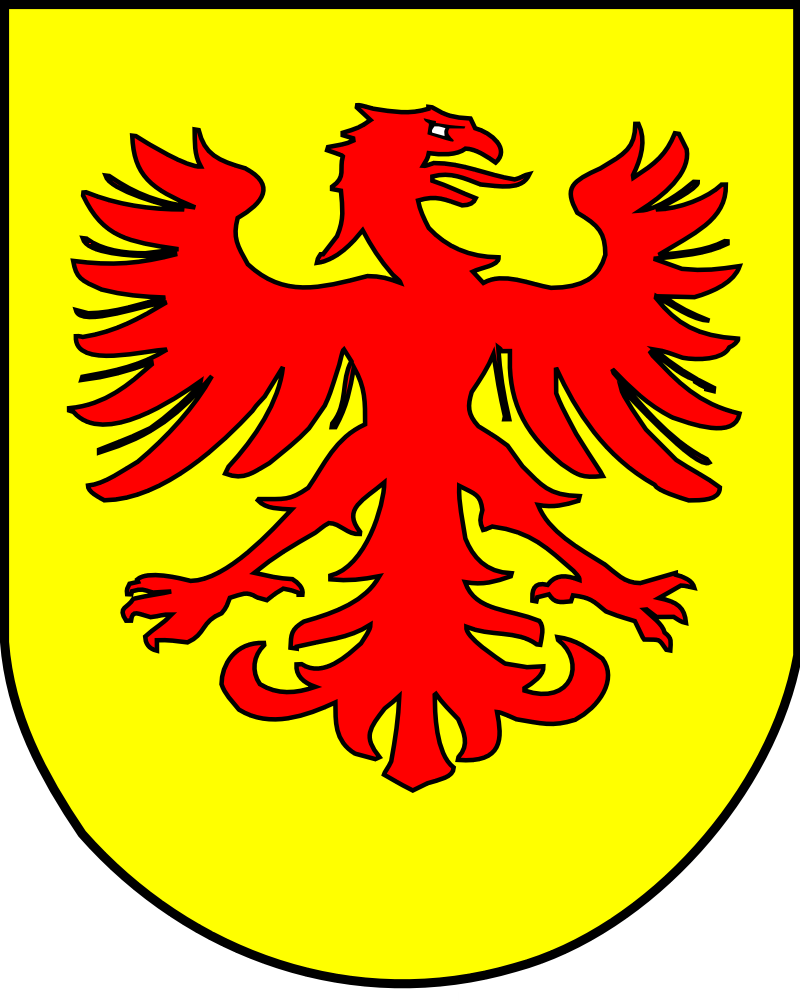
- Coat of arms
- Location of Courtemaîche
- Location within Switzerland Location within Canton of Jura
- Coordinates: 47°28′N 07°03′E
- Country: Switzerland
- Canton: Jura
- District: Porrentruy

Government
  - Mayor: Maire

Area
  - Total: 8.94 km^{2} (3.45 sq mi)
- Elevation: 398 m (1,306 ft)

Population (2003)
  - Total: 664
  - Density: 74.3/km^{2} (192/sq mi)
- Time zone: UTC+01:00 (CET)
  - Summer (DST): UTC+02:00 (CEST)
- Postal code: 2823
- SFOS number: 816
- ISO 3166 code: CH-JU
- Surrounded by: Bure, Buix, Montignez, Damphreux, Coeuve, Courchavon
- Website: www.courtemaiche.ch

Courtemaîche (French pronunciation: [kuʁtəmɛʃ]; Frainc-Comtou: Codgemaîtche) is a former municipality in the district of Porrentruy in the canton of Jura in Switzerland. On 1 January 2009 the former municipalities of Buix, Courtemaîche and Montignez merged to form the new municipality of Basse-Allaine. It has a total area of 894 km sq (345 sq mile) and a population of 664.
