= Damphreux =

- Former municipality
- Coat of arms
- Location of Damphreux
- Location within Switzerland Location within Canton of Jura
- Coordinates: 47°29′N 07°06′E
- Country: Switzerland
- Canton: Jura
- District: Porrentruy

Government
  - Mayor: Maire

Area
  - Total: 5.62 km^{2} (2.17 sq mi)
- Elevation: 420 m (1,380 ft)

Population (2003)
  - Total: 175
  - Density: 31.1/km^{2} (80.6/sq mi)
- Time zone: UTC+01:00 (CET)
  - Summer (DST): UTC+02:00 (CEST)
- Postal code: 2933
- SFOS number: 6787
- ISO 3166 code: CH-JU
- Surrounded by: Lugnez, Beurnevésin, Bonfol, Vendlincourt, Coeuve, Courtemaîche, Montignez
- Website: www.damphreux.ch

Damphreux (French pronunciation: [dɑ̃fʁø]; Frainc-Comtou: Daimphreux) is a former municipality in the district of Porrentruy in the canton of Jura in Switzerland.

== History ==
Damphreux is first mentioned in 1161 as Damfriol. On 1 January 2023, Damphreux and Lugnez were merged to form the new municipality of Damphreux-Lugnez.

== Geography ==
Aerial view (1950)

Damphreux has an area of 5.67 km^{2} (2.19 sq mi). Of this area, 3.53 km^{2} (1.36 mi^{2}) or 62.4% is used for agricultural purposes, while 1.78 km^{2} (0.69 mi^{2}) or 31.4% is forested. Of the rest of the land, 0.29 km^{2} (0.11 mi^{2}) or 5.1% is settled (buildings or roads), 0.03 km^{2} (7.4 acres) or 0.5% is either rivers or lakes and 0.03 km^{2} (7.4 acres) or 0.5% is unproductive land.

Of the built up area, housing and buildings made up 2.3% and transportation infrastructure made up 2.3%. Out of the forested land, all of the forested land area is covered with heavy forests. Of the agricultural land, 38.7% is used for growing crops and 23.3% is pastures. Of the water in the municipality, 0.4% is in lakes and 0.2% is in rivers and streams.

The municipality is located in the Porrentruy district.

== Coat of arms ==
The blazon of the municipal coat of arms is Argent, a Squirrel Gules holding an Acorn Vert sitting on a Mount of the last.

== Demographics ==
Damphreux has a population (as of December 2020) of 181. As of 2008, 7.2% of the population are resident foreign nationals. Over the last 10 years (2000–2010) the population has changed at a rate of -1.7%. Migration accounted for -4.7%, while births and deaths accounted for 2.3%.

Most of the population (as of 2000) speaks French (144 or 86.7%) as their first language, German is the second most common (19 or 11.4%) and Italian is the third (1 or 0.6%).

As of 2008, the population was 53.3% male and 46.7% female. The population was made up of 83 Swiss men (49.1% of the population) and 7 (4.1%) non-Swiss men. There were 74 Swiss women (43.8%) and 5 (3.0%) non-Swiss women. Of the population in the municipality, 71 or about 42.8% were born in Damphreux and lived there in 2000. There were 54 or 32.5% who were born in the same canton, while 24 or 14.5% were born somewhere else in Switzerland, and 17 or 10.2% were born outside of Switzerland.

As of 2000, children and teenagers (0–19 years old) make up 25.3% of the population, while adults (20–64 years old) make up 56% and seniors (over 64 years old) make up 18.7%.

As of 2000, there were 57 people who were single and never married in the municipality. There were 84 married individuals, 12 widows or widowers and 13 individuals who are divorced.

As of 2000, there were 69 private households in the municipality, and an average of 2.4 persons per household. There were 23 households that consist of only one person and 6 households with five or more people. In 2000, a total of 66 apartments (79.5% of the total) were permanently occupied, while 15 apartments (18.1%) were seasonally occupied and 2 apartments (2.4%) were empty. The vacancy rate for the municipality, in 2010, was 4.6%.

The historical population is given in the following chart:

== Politics ==
In the 2007 federal election the most popular party was the CVP which received 39.81% of the vote. The next three most popular parties were the FDP (25%), the SPS (17.59%) and the SVP (12.96%). In the federal election, a total of 56 votes were cast, and the voter turnout was 47.9%.

== Economy ==
As of 2010, Damphreux had an unemployment rate of 2.9%. As of 2008, there were 25 people employed in the primary economic sector and about 9 businesses involved in this sector. 5 people were employed in the secondary sector and there were 2 businesses in this sector. 27 people were employed in the tertiary sector, with 9 businesses in this sector. There were 78 residents of the municipality who were employed in some capacity, of which females made up 41.0% of the workforce.

In 2008 the total number of full-time equivalent jobs was 47. The number of jobs in the primary sector was 20, all of which were in agriculture. The number of jobs in the secondary sector was 4 of which 1 was in manufacturing and 3 (75.0%) were in construction. The number of jobs in the tertiary sector was 23. In the tertiary sector; 7 or 30.4% were in wholesale or retail sales or the repair of motor vehicles, 2 or 8.7% were in the movement and storage of goods, 2 or 8.7% were in a hotel or restaurant, 4 or 17.4% were in education.

In 2000, there were 26 workers who commuted into the municipality and 55 workers who commuted away. The municipality is a net exporter of workers, with about 2.1 workers leaving the municipality for every one entering. About 34.6% of the workforce coming into Damphreux are coming from outside Switzerland. Of the working population, 10.3% used public transportation to get to work, and 64.1% used a private car.

== Religion ==
From the 2000 census, 126 or 75.9% were Roman Catholic, while 24 or 14.5% belonged to the Swiss Reformed Church. There was 1 individual who was Islamic. 14 (or about 8.43% of the population) belonged to no church, are agnostic or atheist, and 1 individuals (or about 0.60% of the population) did not answer the question.

== Education ==
In Damphreux about 48 or (28.9%) of the population have completed non-mandatory upper secondary education, and 5 or (3.0%) have completed additional higher education (either university or a Fachhochschule). Of the 5 who completed tertiary schooling, 20.0% were Swiss men, 60.0% were Swiss women.

The Canton of Jura school system provides two year of non-obligatory Kindergarten, followed by six years of Primary school. This is followed by three years of obligatory lower Secondary school where the students are separated according to ability and aptitude. Following the lower Secondary students may attend a three or four year optional upper Secondary school followed by some form of Tertiary school or they may enter an apprenticeship.

During the 2009-10 school year, there were no students attending school in Damphreux.

As of 2000, there were 16 students in Damphreux who came from another municipality, while 15 residents attended schools outside the municipality.
