= Coeuve =

Cœuve
- Municipality
- Coat of arms
- Location of Cœuve
- Location within Switzerland Location within Canton of Jura
- Coordinates: 47°27′N 07°06′E
- Country: Switzerland
- Canton: Jura
- District: Porrentruy

Government
  - Executive: Conseil communal with 7 members
  - Mayor: Maire; Pierre-André Henzelin (as of 2026)

Area
  - Total: 11.59 km^{2} (4.47 sq mi)
- Elevation: 432 m (1,417 ft)

Population (2003)
  - Total: 649
  - Density: 56.0/km^{2} (145/sq mi)
- Time zone: UTC+01:00 (CET)
  - Summer (DST): UTC+02:00 (CEST)
- Postal code: 2932
- SFOS number: 6781
- ISO 3166 code: CH-JU
- Surrounded by: Porrentruy, Courchavon, Courtemaîche, Damphreux, Vendlincourt, Alle
- Website: https://coeuve.ch/

Cœuve (French pronunciation: [kœv]) is a municipality in the district of Porrentruy in the canton of Jura in Switzerland.

== History ==
Cœuve is first mentioned in 1136 as Cova.

== Geography ==
Cœuve has an area of 11.62 km^{2} (4.49 sq mi). Of this area, 6.61 km^{2} (2.55 mi^{2}) or 56.8% is used for agricultural purposes, while 4.36 km^{2} (1.68 mi^{2}) or 37.5% is forested. Of the rest of the land, 0.58 km^{2} (0.22 mi^{2}) or 5.0% is settled (buildings or roads), 0.02 km^{2} (4.9 acres) or 0.2% is either rivers or lakes and 0.01 km^{2} (2.5 acres) or 0.1% is unproductive land.

Of the built up area, housing and buildings made up 3.0% and transportation infrastructure made up 1.5%. Out of the forested land, all of the forested land area is covered with heavy forests. Of the agricultural land, 37.9% is used for growing crops and 15.6% is pastures, while 3.3% is used for orchards or vine crops. All the water in the municipality is flowing water.

The municipality is located in the Porrentruy district.

== Coat of arms ==
The blazon of the municipal coat of arms is Azure, a Bend sinister Or, in chief dexter a Fleur-de-lis of the same.

== Demographics ==
Cœuve has a population (as of December 2020) of 740. As of 2008, 6.6% of the population are resident foreign nationals. Over the last 10 years (2000–2010) the population has changed at a rate of 3.3%. Migration accounted for 3.9%, while births and deaths accounted for 2.3%.

Most of the population (as of 2000) speaks French (607 or 95.3%) as their first language, German is the second most common (18 or 2.8%) and Portuguese is the third (5 or 0.8%). and 1 person who speaks Romansh.

As of 2008, the population was 47.7% male and 52.3% female. The population was made up of 305 Swiss men (44.7% of the population) and 21 (3.1%) non-Swiss men. There were 336 Swiss women (49.2%) and 21 (3.1%) non-Swiss women. Of the population in the municipality, 350 or about 54.9% were born in Cœuve and lived there in 2000. There were 171 or 26.8% who were born in the same canton, while 53 or 8.3% were born somewhere else in Switzerland, and 43 or 6.8% were born outside of Switzerland.

As of 2000, children and teenagers (0–19 years old) make up 28.6% of the population, while adults (20–64 years old) make up 52.9% and seniors (over 64 years old) make up 18.5%.

As of 2000, there were 263 people who were single and never married in the municipality. There were 326 married individuals, 40 widows or widowers and 8 individuals who are divorced.

As of 2000, there were 233 private households in the municipality, and an average of 2.7 persons per household. There were 54 households that consist of only one person and 26 households with five or more people. In 2000, a total of 229 apartments (88.1% of the total) were permanently occupied, while 18 apartments (6.9%) were seasonally occupied and 13 apartments (5.0%) were empty. The vacancy rate for the municipality, in 2010, was 0.34%.

The historical population is given in the following chart:

== Sights ==
The entire village of Cœuve is designated as part of the Inventory of Swiss Heritage Sites.

== Politics ==
In the 2007 federal election the most popular party was the CVP which received 31.67% of the vote. The next three most popular parties were the FDP (23.21%), the SPS (22.56%) and the SVP (12.36%). In the federal election, a total of 236 votes were cast, and the voter turnout was 46.1%.

== Economy ==
As of 2010, Cœuve had an unemployment rate of 3.8%. As of 2008, there were 54 people employed in the primary economic sector and about 16 businesses involved in this sector. 56 people were employed in the secondary sector and there were 9 businesses in this sector. 49 people were employed in the tertiary sector, with 12 businesses in this sector. There were 284 residents of the municipality who were employed in some capacity, of which females made up 38.4% of the workforce.

In 2008 the total number of full-time equivalent jobs was 124. The number of jobs in the primary sector was 33, all of which were in agriculture. The number of jobs in the secondary sector was 53 of which 39 or (73.6%) were in manufacturing and 15 (28.3%) were in construction. The number of jobs in the tertiary sector was 38. In the tertiary sector; 8 or 21.1% were in wholesale or retail sales or the repair of motor vehicles, 9 or 23.7% were in the movement and storage of goods, 6 or 15.8% were in a hotel or restaurant, 3 or 7.9% were technical professionals or scientists, 5 or 13.2% were in education.

In 2000, there were 91 workers who commuted into the municipality and 183 workers who commuted away. The municipality is a net exporter of workers, with about 2.0 workers leaving the municipality for every one entering. About 28.6% of the workforce coming into Cœuve are coming from outside Switzerland. Of the working population, 6% used public transportation to get to work, and 66.2% used a private car.

== Religion ==
From the 2000 census, 528 or 82.9% were Roman Catholic, while 29 or 4.6% belonged to the Swiss Reformed Church. Of the rest of the population, there was 1 member of an Orthodox church, and there were 6 individuals (or about 0.94% of the population) who belonged to another Christian church. There were 2 (or about 0.31% of the population) who were Islamic. There was 1 person who was Buddhist. 49 (or about 7.69% of the population) belonged to no church, are agnostic or atheist, and 24 individuals (or about 3.77% of the population) did not answer the question.

== Education ==
In Cœuve about 173 or (27.2%) of the population have completed non-mandatory upper secondary education, and 33 or (5.2%) have completed additional higher education (either university or a Fachhochschule). Of the 33 who completed tertiary schooling, 78.8% were Swiss men, 18.2% were Swiss women.

The Canton of Jura school system provides two year of non-obligatory Kindergarten, followed by six years of Primary school. This is followed by three years of obligatory lower Secondary school where the students are separated according to ability and aptitude. Following the lower Secondary students may attend a three or four year optional upper Secondary school followed by some form of Tertiary school or they may enter an apprenticeship.

During the 2009-10 school year, there were a total of 42 students attending 3 classes in Cœuve. There were no kindergarten classes in the municipality. The municipality had 3 primary classes and 42 students. There are only nine Secondary schools in the canton, so all the students from Cœuve attend their secondary school in another municipality.

As of 2000, there were 42 students from Cœuve who attended schools outside the municipality.
