= Courtavon =

Commune in Grand Est, France

- Commune
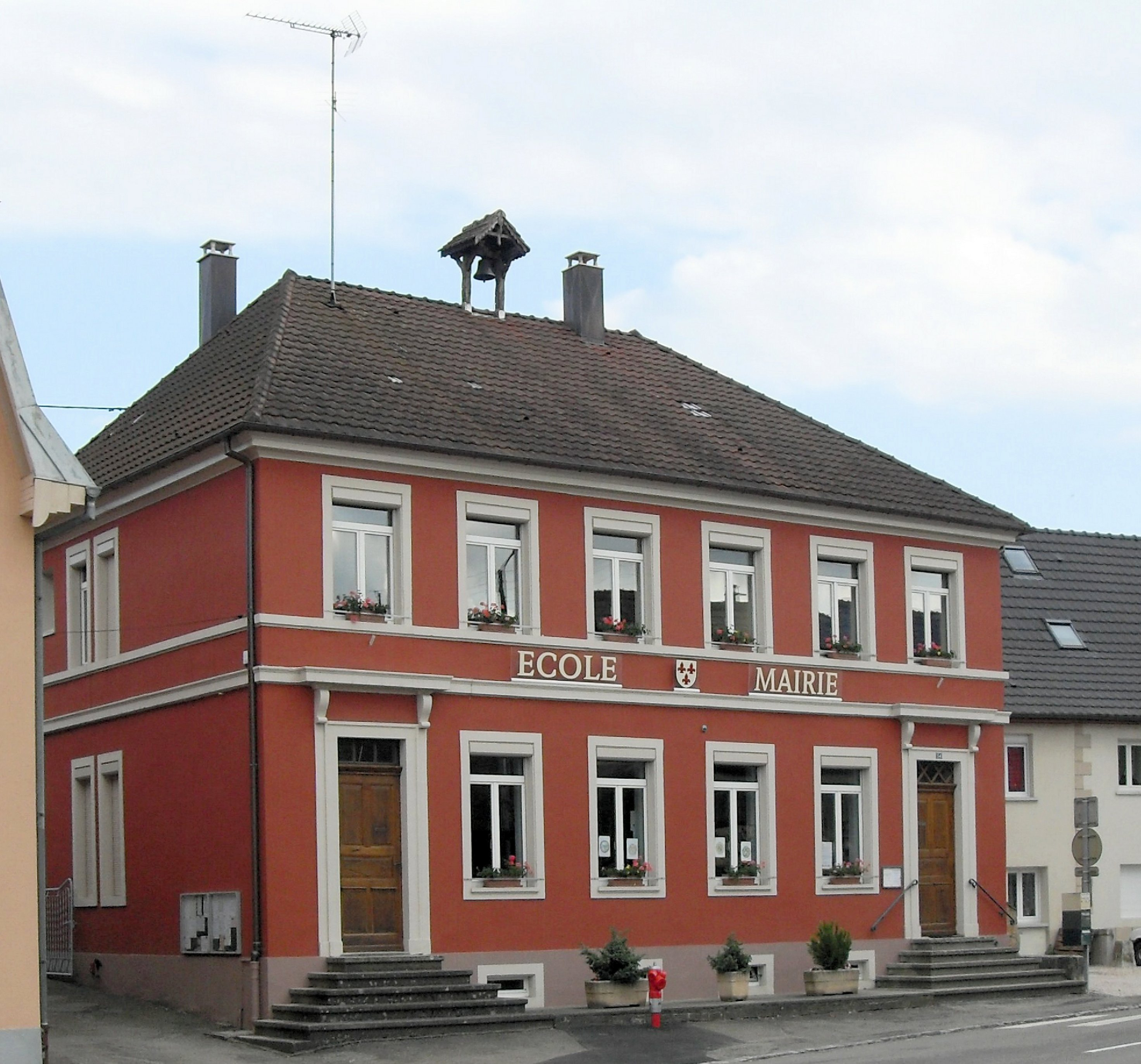
- The town hall and school in Courtavon

- Coat of arms
- Location of Courtavon
- Location within France Location within Grand Est
- Coordinates: 47°27′41″N 7°11′53″E
- Country: France
- Region: Grand Est
- Department: Haut-Rhin
- Arrondissement: Altkirch
- Canton: Altkirch

Government
  - Mayor (2020–2026): François Walch
- Area^{1}: 9.6 km^{2} (3.7 sq mi)
- Elevation: 450 m (1,480 ft)
- Highest elevation: 663 m (2,175 ft)
- Lowest elevation: 417 m (1,368 ft)
- Population (2023): 343
  - Density: 36/km^{2} (93/sq mi)
- Time zone: UTC+01:00 (CET)
  - Summer (DST): UTC+02:00 (CEST)
- INSEE/Postal code: 68067 /68480
- ^{1} French Land Register data, which excludes lakes, ponds, glaciers > 1 km^{2} (0.386 sq mi or 247 acres) and river estuaries.

Courtavon (French pronunciation: [kuʁtavɔ̃]; German: Ottendorf; Alsatian: Ottederf; Frainc-Comtou: Cotchavon) is a commune in the Haut-Rhin department in Alsace in north-eastern France.

== See also ==
- Communes of the Haut-Rhin department
