= Réchésy =

- Commune
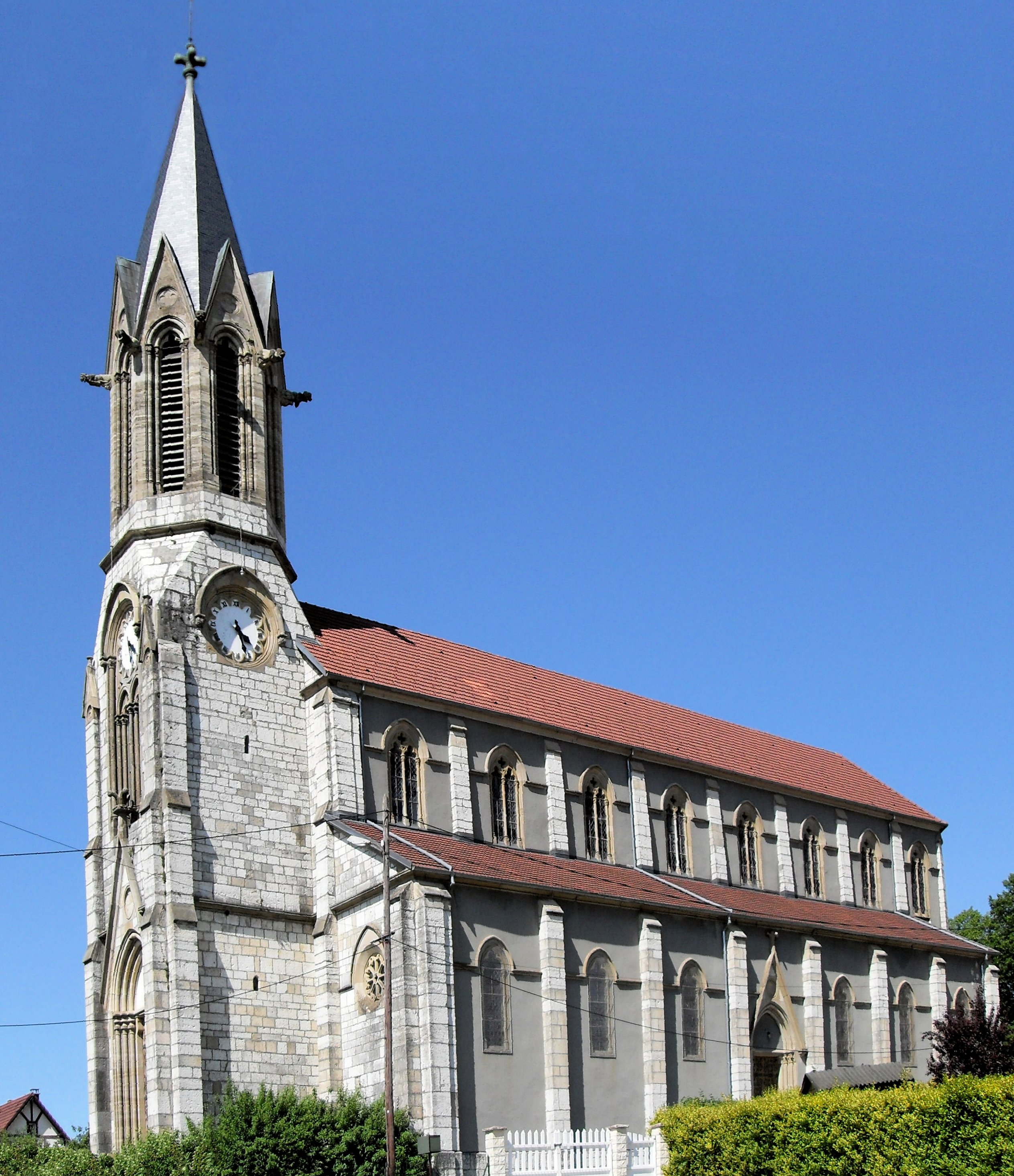
- The church of Saint-Jean-Baptiste

- Coat of arms
- Location of Réchésy
- Location within France Location within Bourgogne-Franche-Comté
- Coordinates: 47°30′33″N 7°06′50″E
- Country: France
- Region: Bourgogne-Franche-Comté
- Department: Territoire de Belfort
- Arrondissement: Belfort
- Canton: Delle
- Intercommunality: Sud Territoire

Government
  - Mayor (2020–2026): André Kleiber
- Area^{1}: 12.61 km^{2} (4.87 sq mi)
- Highest elevation: 552 m (1,811 ft)
- Lowest elevation: 397 m (1,302 ft)
- Population (2023): 764
  - Density: 60.6/km^{2} (157/sq mi)
- Time zone: UTC+01:00 (CET)
  - Summer (DST): UTC+02:00 (CEST)
- INSEE/Postal code: 90081 /90370
- ^{1} French Land Register data, which excludes lakes, ponds, glaciers > 1 km^{2} (0.386 sq mi or 247 acres) and river estuaries.

Réchésy (French pronunciation: [ʁeʃezi]) is a commune in the Territoire de Belfort department in Bourgogne-Franche-Comté in northeastern France.

== See also ==
- Communes of the Territoire de Belfort department
