= Courcelles, Territoire de Belfort =

Courcelles
- Commune
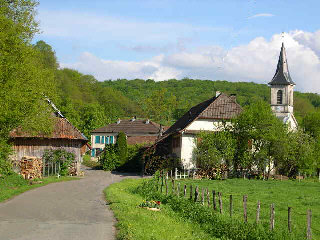
- The village of Courcelles

- Coat of arms
- Location of Courcelles
- Location within France Location within Bourgogne-Franche-Comté
- Coordinates: 47°29′56″N 7°04′37″E
- Country: France
- Region: Bourgogne-Franche-Comté
- Department: Territoire de Belfort
- Arrondissement: Belfort
- Canton: Delle
- Intercommunality: Sud Territoire

Government
  - Mayor (2020–2026): Annick Prenat
- Area^{1}: 5.32 km^{2} (2.05 sq mi)
- Highest elevation: 512 m (1,680 ft)
- Lowest elevation: 385 m (1,263 ft)
- Population (2023): 132
  - Density: 24.8/km^{2} (64.3/sq mi)
- Time zone: UTC+01:00 (CET)
  - Summer (DST): UTC+02:00 (CEST)
- INSEE/Postal code: 90027 /90100
- ^{1} French Land Register data, which excludes lakes, ponds, glaciers > 1 km^{2} (0.386 sq mi or 247 acres) and river estuaries.

Courcelles (French pronunciation: [kuʁsɛl]) is a commune in the Territoire de Belfort department in Bourgogne-Franche-Comté in northeastern France.

== See also ==
- Communes of the Territoire de Belfort department
