= Ajoie =

Landscape in the north of the Swiss canton of Jura

Coordinates: 47°N 7°E

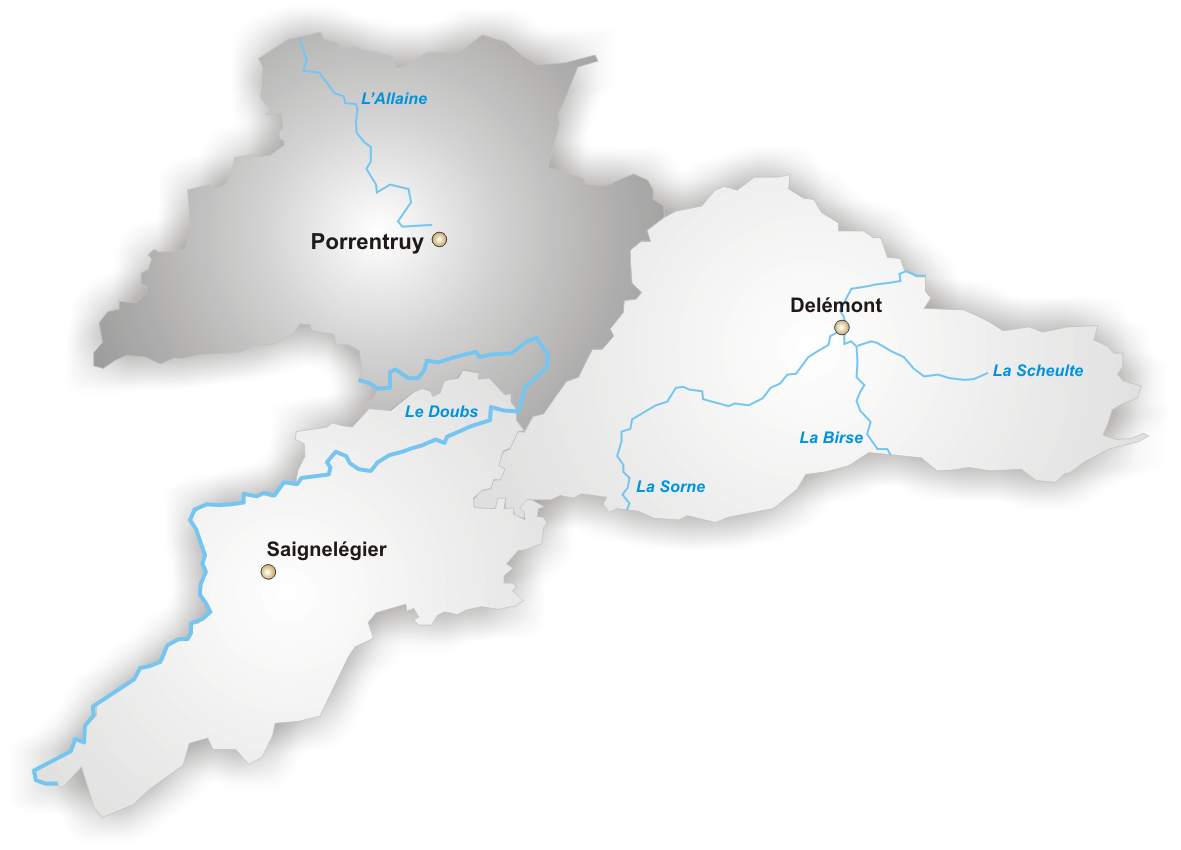
Map of the Ajoie

The Ajoie (French pronunciation: [aʒwa]; German: Elsgau, Frainc-Comtou: Aidjoue) is an historic region roughly coinciding with Porrentruy District in the canton of Jura in northwestern Switzerland.

It is a part of the Jura plain, composed of six geographic areas:

- the Vendline (river) valley (northeast), with the communities Vendlincourt, Bonfol and Beurnevésin;
- La Baroche (east): Miécourt, Charmoille, Fregiécourt, Pleujouse and Asuel;
- the flanc du Mont Terri (south): Cornol, Courgenay, Fontenais and Bressaucourt;
- the Haute-Ajoie (west): Courtedoux, Chevenez, Rocourt, Roche-d'Or, Réclère, Damvant, Grandfontaine, Fahy and Bure;
- Allaine (river) valley (centre and north): Alle, Porrentruy, Courchavon, Courtemaîche, Montignez, Buix and Boncourt;
- the Coeuvatte valley (north): Coeuve, Damphreux and Lugnez.

The inhabitants are mainly Roman Catholic. Each year on St. Martin's Day they enjoy a substantial banquet lasting for many hours, and composed of all the various cuts of freshly butchered pigs, together with regional wines and shots of damassine, the regional AOC eau de vie.

It is also an occasion to discover the traditions and other products of the Ajoie terroir.

The Swiss Army has established a large military camp for their armoured corps close to the Swiss-French border, on Bure territory.
