= Haute-Ajoie =

- Municipality
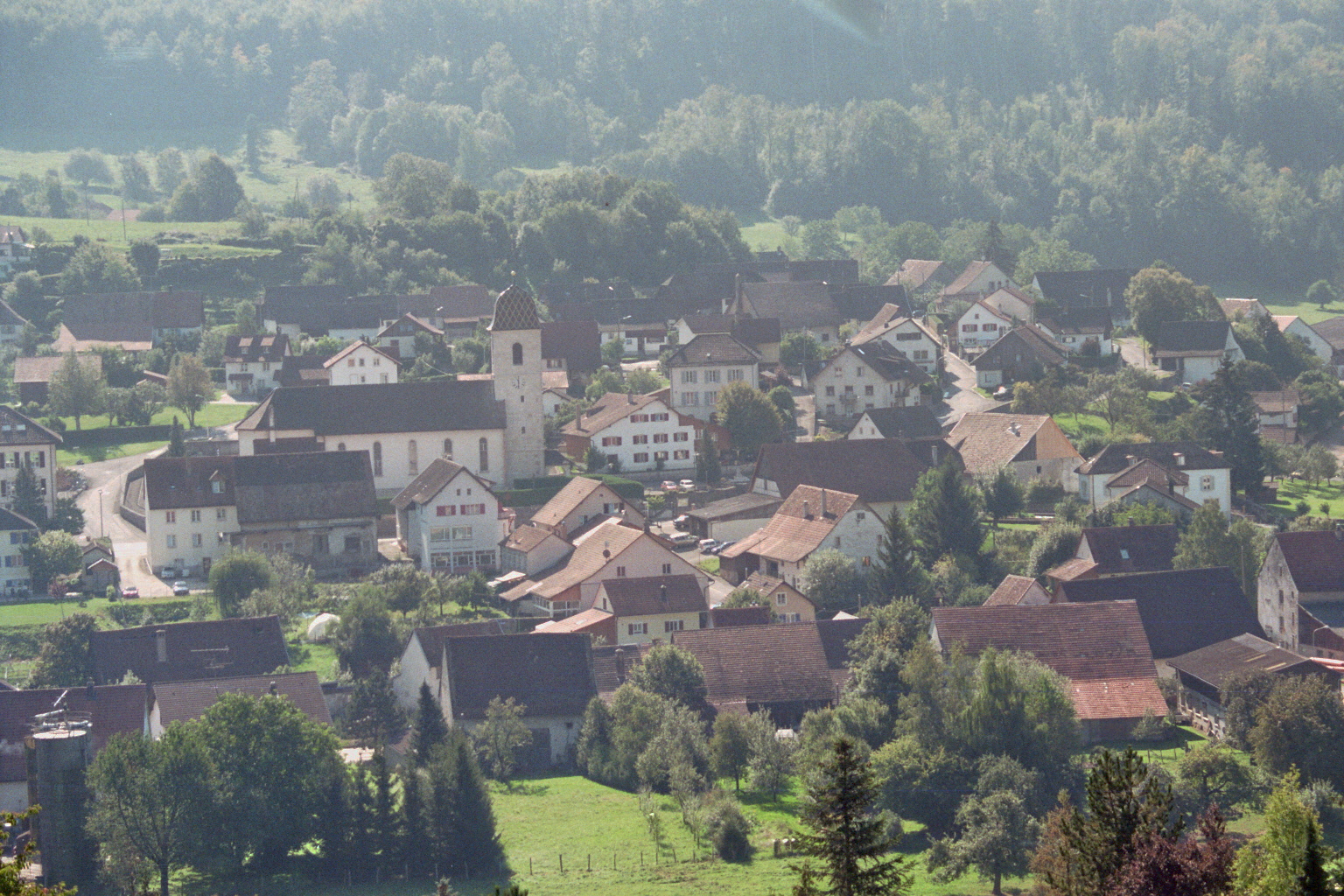
- Chevenez village
- Location of Haute-Ajoie
- Location within Switzerland Location within Canton of Jura
- Coordinates: 47°23′N 07°00′E
- Country: Switzerland
- Canton: Jura
- District: Porrentruy

Government
  - Executive: Conseil communal with 8 (Note: The Secretary of the Council is also a part of the Conseil communal.) members
  - Mayor: Maire; Josiane Sudan (as of 2026)

Area
  - Total: 36.43 km^{2} (14.07 sq mi)
- Elevation: 491 m (1,611 ft)

Population (2000)
  - Total: 993
  - Density: 27.3/km^{2} (70.6/sq mi)
- Time zone: UTC+01:00 (CET)
  - Summer (DST): UTC+02:00 (CEST)
- Postal code: 2906
- SFOS number: 6809
- ISO 3166 code: CH-JU
- Surrounded by: Grandfontaine, Rocourt, Fahy, Bure, Courtedoux, Bressaucourt, Vaufrey (F), Montjoie-le-Château (F), Villars-lès-Blamont (F), Dannemarie (F), Montancy (F), Glère(F)
- Website: www.hauteajoie.ch

Haute-Ajoie (French pronunciation: [ot aʒwa]) is a municipality in the district of Porrentruy in the canton of Jura in Switzerland. It was founded on 1 January 2009 by the former municipalities of Chevenez, Damvant, Réclère and Roche-d'Or.

On 1 January 2018 the former municipality of Rocourt merged into the municipality of Haute-Ajoie.

== Geography ==
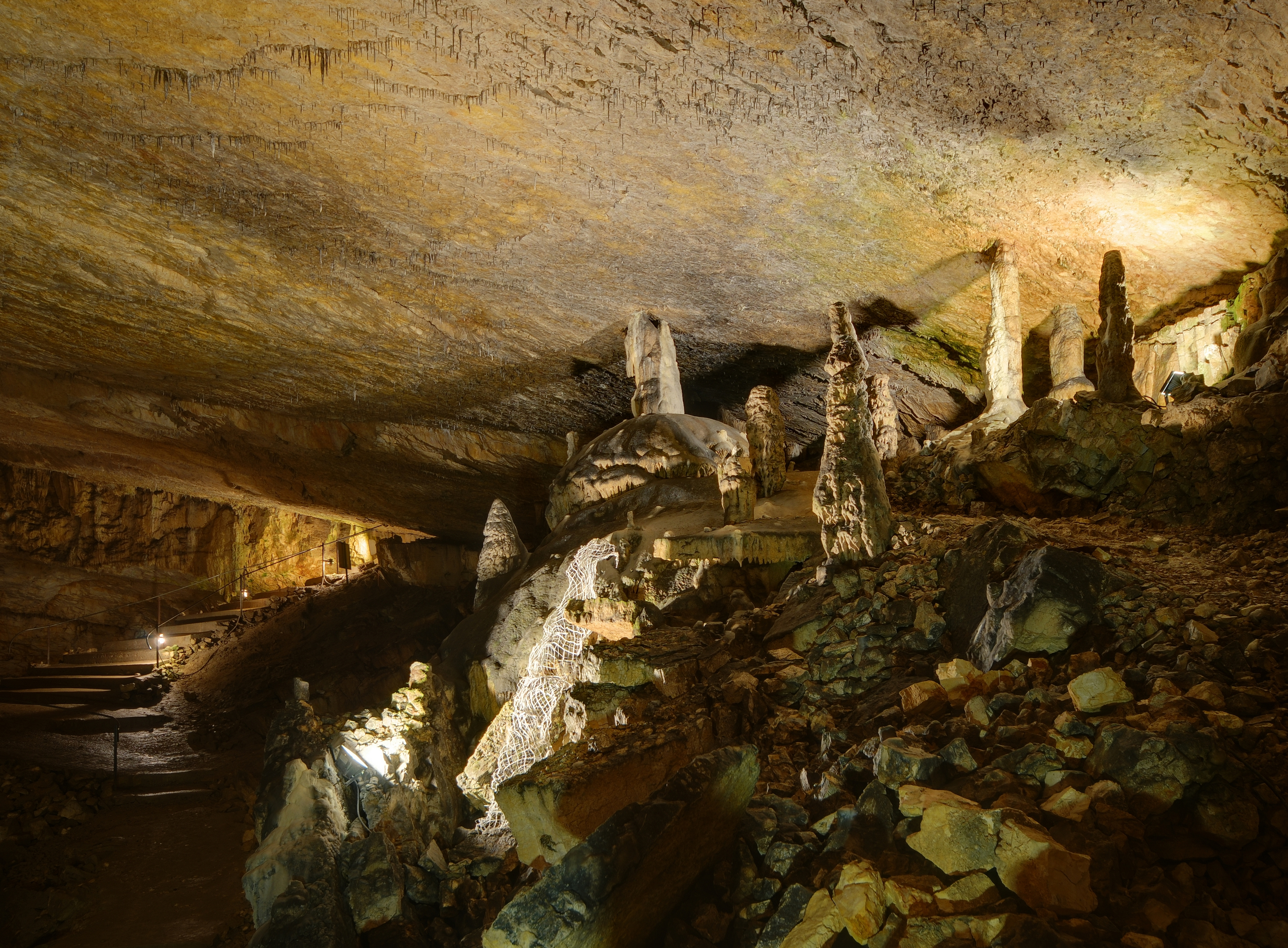
Réclère cave

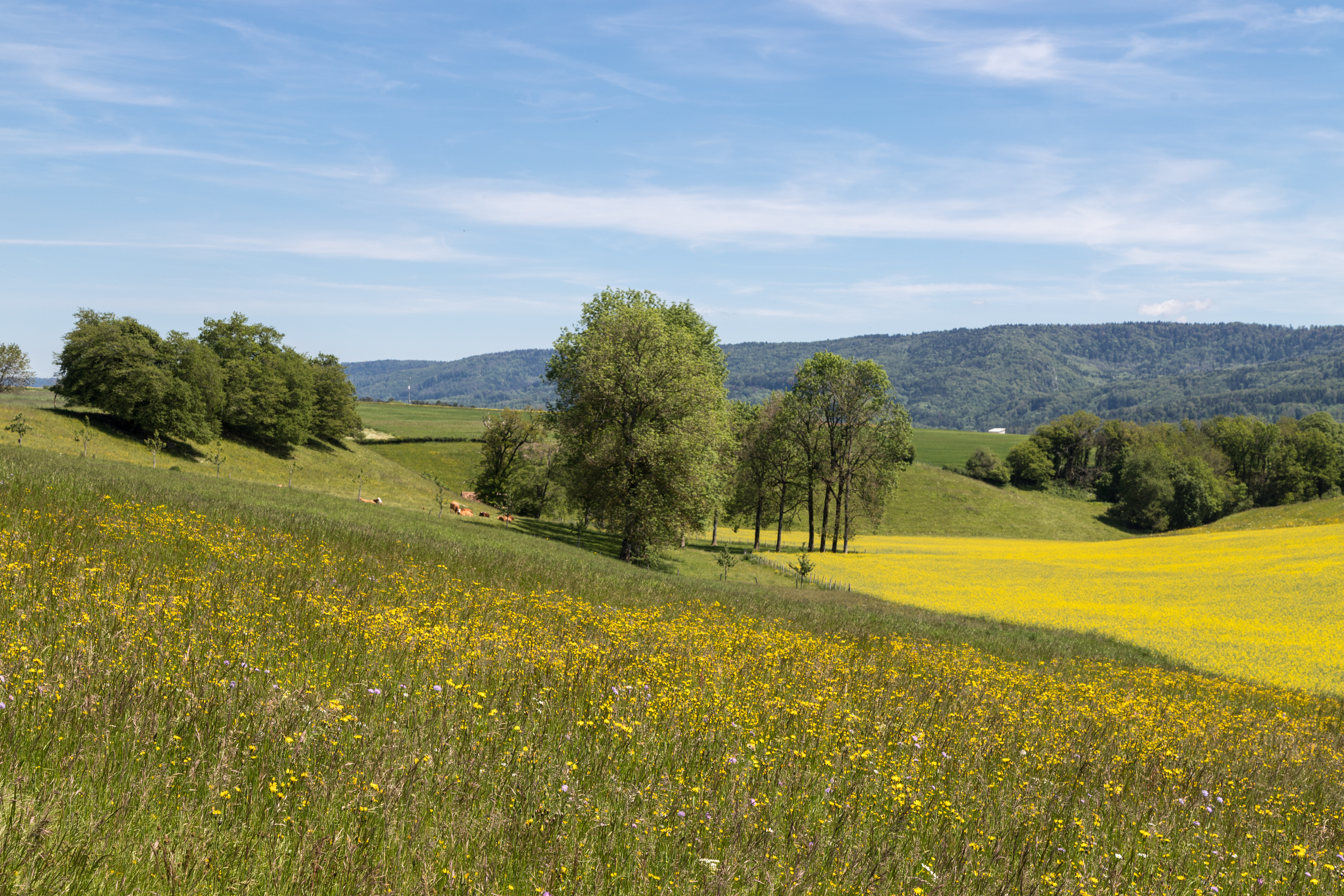
Landscape between Fahy and Grandfontaine

Haute-Ajoie has an area of 36.47 km^{2} (14.08 sq mi). Of this area, 20.38 km^{2} (7.87 mi^{2}) or 55.9% is used for agricultural purposes, while 14.62 km^{2} (5.64 mi^{2}) or 40.1% is forested. Of the rest of the land, 1.45 km^{2} (0.56 mi^{2}) or 4.0% is settled (buildings or roads) and 0.01 km^{2} (2.5 acres) or 0.0% is unproductive land.

Of the built up area, housing and buildings made up 1.8% and transportation infrastructure made up 1.4%. Out of the forested land, 36.5% of the total land area is heavily forested and 3.6% is covered with orchards or small clusters of trees. Of the agricultural land, 25.4% is used for growing crops and 25.9% is pastures and 3.8% is used for alpine pastures.

== Demographics ==
Haute-Ajoie has a population (as of December 2020) of 6,557. As of 2010, 7.7% of the population are resident foreign nationals. Over the last 10 years (2000–2010) the population has changed at a rate of -2.4%. Migration accounted for 0.2%, while births and deaths accounted for -0.8%.

Most of the population (as of 2000) speaks French (91.5%) as their first language, German is the second most common (6.8%) and Italian is the third (0.4%).

As of 2008, the population was 50.3% male and 49.7% female. The population was made up of 460 Swiss men (46.1% of the population) and 41 (4.1%) non-Swiss men. There were 460 Swiss women (46.1%) and 36 (3.6%) non-Swiss women. As of 2000, children and teenagers (0–19 years old) make up 25.6% of the population, while adults (20–64 years old) make up 55.6% and seniors (over 64 years old) make up 18.8%.

As of 2009, the construction rate of new housing units was 1 new units per 1000 residents. The vacancy rate for the municipality, in 2010, was 3.31%.

== Historic Population ==
The historical population is given in the following chart:

== Sights ==
The entire village of Chevenez is designated as part of the Inventory of Swiss Heritage Sites.

== Economy ==
As of 2010, Haute-Ajoie had an unemployment rate of 4.4%. As of 2008, there were 122 people employed in the primary economic sector and about 41 businesses involved in this sector. 413 people were employed in the secondary sector and there were 6 businesses in this sector. 92 people were employed in the tertiary sector, with 21 businesses in this sector. Of the working population, 7.5% used public transportation to get to work, and 57% used a private car.

== Politics ==
In the 2007 federal election the most popular party was the CVP which received 42.4% of the vote. The next three most popular parties were the SPS (29.4%), the SVP (14%) and the FDP (11.5%).

== Education ==
The Canton of Jura school system provides two year of non-obligatory Kindergarten, followed by six years of Primary school. This is followed by three years of obligatory lower Secondary school where the students are separated according to ability and aptitude. Following the lower Secondary students may attend a three or four year optional upper Secondary school followed by some form of Tertiary school or they may enter an apprenticeship.

During the 2009-10 school year, there were a total of 123 students attending 8 classes in Haute-Ajoie. There were 2 kindergarten classes with a total of 27 students in the municipality. The municipality had 6 primary classes and 96 students. There are only nine Secondary schools in the canton, so all the students from Haute-Ajoie attend their secondary school in another municipality.
