= Municipalities of the canton of Jura =

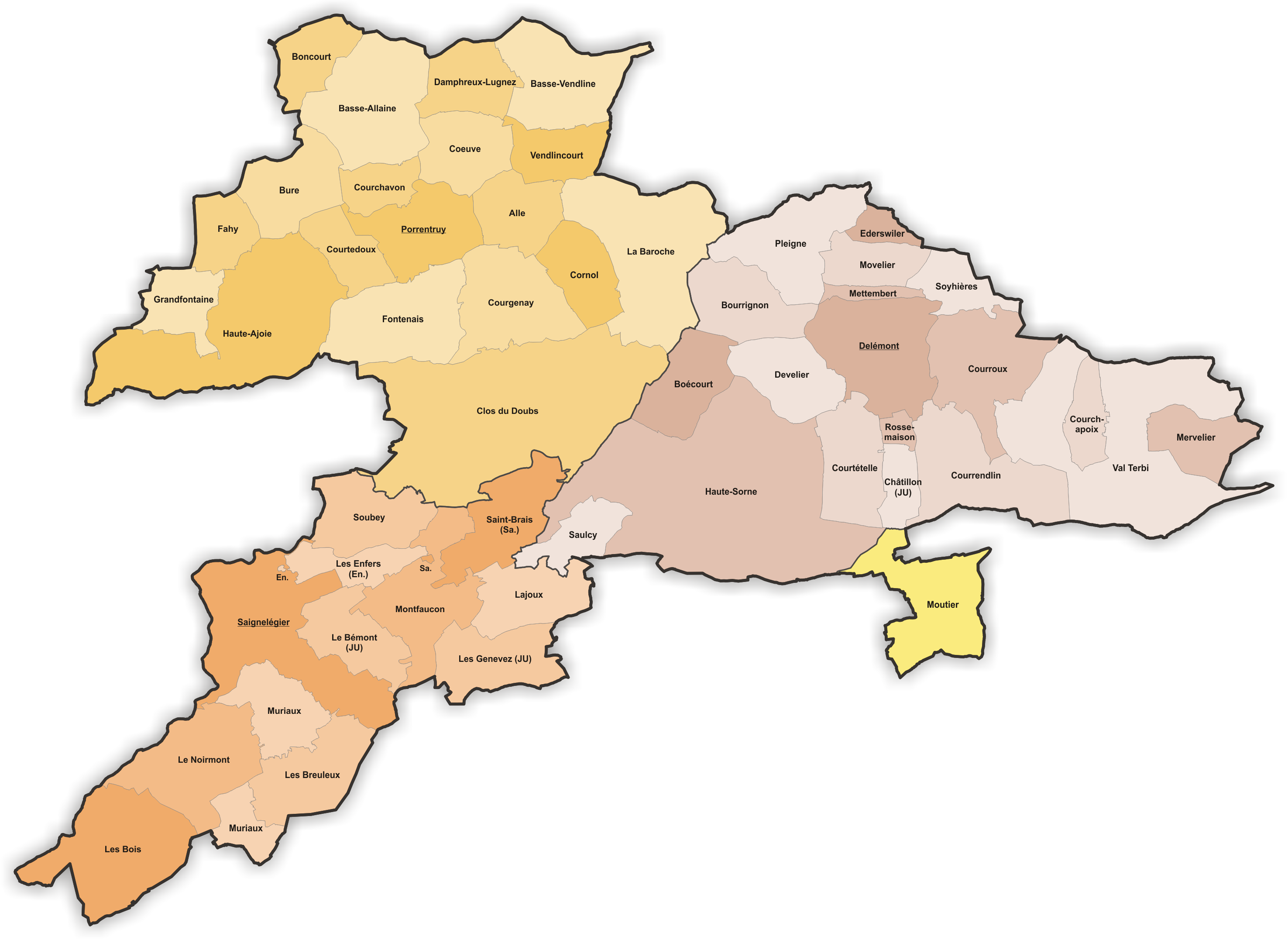
Municipalities in the canton of Jura

The following are the 51 municipalities of the canton of Jura, as of January 1, 2026.

== List ==
- Alle
- Basse-Allaine
- Basse-Vendline
- Boécourt
- Boncourt
- Bourrignon
- Bure
- Châtillon (JU)
- Clos du Doubs
- Coeuve
- Cornol
- Courchapoix
- Courchavon
- Courgenay
- Courrendlin
- Courroux
- Courtedoux
- Courtételle
- Damphreux-Lugnez
- Delémont
- Develier
- Ederswiler
- Fahy
- Fontenais
- Grandfontaine
- Haute-Ajoie
- Haute-Sorne
- La Baroche
- Lajoux (JU)
- Le Bémont (JU)
- Le Noirmont
- Les Bois
- Les Breuleux
- Les Enfers
- Les Genevez (JU)
- Mervelier
- Mettembert
- Montfaucon
- Moutier
- Movelier
- Muriaux
- Pleigne
- Porrentruy
- Rossemaison
- Saignelégier
- Saint-Brais
- Saulcy
- Soubey
- Soyhières
- Val Terbi
- Vendlincourt
