= Damvant =

- Former municipality
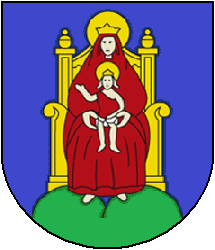
- Coat of arms
- Location of Damvant
- Location within Switzerland Location within Canton of Jura
- Coordinates: 47°22′N 06°54′E
- Country: Switzerland
- Canton: Jura
- District: Porrentruy

Area
  - Total: 5.05 km^{2} (1.95 sq mi)
- Elevation: 609 m (1,998 ft)

Population (2000)
  - Total: 129
  - Density: 25.5/km^{2} (66.2/sq mi)
- Time zone: UTC+01:00 (CET)
  - Summer (DST): UTC+02:00 (CEST)
- Postal code: 2914
- SFOS number: 818
- ISO 3166 code: CH-JU
- Surrounded by: Grandfontaine, Réclère, Vaufrey(F), Montjoie-le-Château(F), Villars-lès-Blamont(F) and Dannemarie(F)
- Website: SFSO statistics

Damvant (French pronunciation: [dɑ̃vɑ̃]; Frainc-Comtou: Daimvant) is a village and former municipality in the district of Porrentruy in the canton of Jura in Switzerland. Since 1 January 2009 it has been part of the new municipality Haute-Ajoie.
