= Chevenez =

- Former municipality
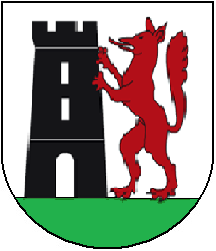
- Coat of arms
- Location of Chevenez
- Location within Switzerland Location within Canton of Jura
- Coordinates: 47°24′N 07°00′E
- Country: Switzerland
- Canton: Jura
- District: Porrentruy

Area
  - Total: 21.73 km^{2} (8.39 sq mi)
- Elevation: 491 m (1,611 ft)

Population (2003)
  - Total: 674
  - Density: 31.0/km^{2} (80.3/sq mi)
- Time zone: UTC+01:00 (CET)
  - Summer (DST): UTC+02:00 (CEST)
- Postal code: 2906
- SFOS number: 810
- ISO 3166 code: CH-JU
- Surrounded by: Roche-d'Or, Rocourt, Fahy, Bure, Courtedoux, Bressaucourt, Montancy(F), Vernois-le-Fol(F)
- Website: SFSO statistics

Aerial view (1950)

Chevenez is a village and former municipality in the district of Porrentruy in the canton of Jura in Switzerland. Since 1 January 2009 it is a part of the new municipality Haute-Ajoie.
