= Réclère =

- Former municipality
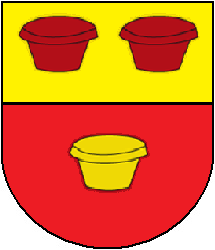
- Coat of arms
- Location of Réclère
- Location within Switzerland Location within Canton of Jura
- Coordinates: 47°23′N 06°55′E
- Country: Switzerland
- Canton: Jura
- District: Porrentruy

Area
  - Total: 6.19 km^{2} (2.39 sq mi)
- Elevation: 590 m (1,940 ft)

Population (2003)
  - Total: 193
  - Density: 31.2/km^{2} (80.8/sq mi)
- Time zone: UTC+01:00 (CET)
  - Summer (DST): UTC+02:00 (CEST)
- Postal code: 2912
- SFOS number: 831
- ISO 3166 code: CH-JU
- Surrounded by: Damvant, Grandfontaine, Roche-d'Or, Vaufrey(F)
- Website: SFSO statistics

Réclère (French pronunciation: [ʁeklɛʁ]; Frainc-Comtou: Réçhère) is a village and former municipality in the district of Porrentruy in the canton of Jura in Switzerland. Since 1 January 2009 it is a part of the new municipality Haute-Ajoie.
