= Roche-d'Or =

- Former municipality
- Location of Roche-d'Or
- Location within Switzerland Location within Canton of Jura
- Coordinates: 47°22′N 06°57′E
- Country: Switzerland
- Canton: Jura
- District: Porrentruy

Area
  - Total: 3.46 km^{2} (1.34 sq mi)
- Elevation: 842 m (2,762 ft)

Population (2003)
  - Total: 39
  - Density: 11/km^{2} (29/sq mi)
- Time zone: UTC+01:00 (CET)
  - Summer (DST): UTC+02:00 (CEST)
- Postal code: 2912
- SFOS number: 6802
- ISO 3166 code: CH-JU
- Surrounded by: Réclère, Grandfontaine, Rocourt, Chevenez, Vaufrey(F), Montursin(F), Vernois-le-Fol(F)
- Website: SFSO statistics

Roche-d'Or (French pronunciation: [ʁɔʃ dɔʁ]; Frainc-Comtou: Rœutche-d'Oûe) is a village and former municipality in the district of Porrentruy in the canton of Jura in Switzerland. Since 1 January 2009 it is a part of the new municipality Haute-Ajoie.
