= Rocourt, Jura =

Rocourt
- Former municipality
- Coat of arms
- Location of Rocourt
- Location within Switzerland Location within Canton of Jura
- Coordinates: 47°23′N 06°57′E
- Country: Switzerland
- Canton: Jura
- District: Porrentruy

Government
  - Mayor: Maire

Area
  - Total: 4.48 km^{2} (1.73 sq mi)
- Elevation: 508 m (1,667 ft)

Population (2003)
  - Total: 140
  - Density: 31/km^{2} (81/sq mi)
- Time zone: UTC+01:00 (CET)
  - Summer (DST): UTC+02:00 (CEST)
- Postal code: 2907
- SFOS number: 6803
- ISO 3166 code: CH-JU
- Surrounded by: Grandfontaine, Fahy, Chevenez, Roche-d'Or
- Website: www.rocourt.ch

Rocourt (French pronunciation: [ʁɔkuʁ]; Frainc-Comtou: Rôcouét) is a former municipality in the district of Porrentruy in the canton of Jura in Switzerland. On 1 January 2018 the former municipality of Rocourt merged into the municipality of Haute-Ajoie.

== History ==
Aerial view (1950)

Rocourt is first mentioned in 1148 as Rocort.

== Geography ==
Rocourt has an area of 4.46 km^{2} (1.72 sq mi). Of this area, 2.67 km^{2} (1.03 mi^{2}) or 59.7% is used for agricultural purposes, while 1.61 km^{2} (0.62 mi^{2}) or 36.0% is forested. Of the rest of the land, 0.21 km^{2} (0.081 mi^{2}) or 4.7% is settled (buildings or roads).

Of the built up area, housing and buildings made up 3% and transportation infrastructure made up 1.6%. Out of the forested land, 31% of the total land area is heavily forested and 5% is covered with orchards or small clusters of trees. Of the agricultural land, 21% is used for growing crops and 35% is pastures and 3% is used for alpine pastures.

The municipality is located in the Porrentruy district. The village of Rocourt consists of two sections which are divided by the Porrentruy-Besançon road.

== Coat of arms ==
The blazon of the municipal coat of arms is Gules billetty Or a Cross of the last.

== Demographics ==
Rocourt has a population (as of December 2020) of 157. As of 2008, 1.4% of the population are resident foreign nationals. Over the last 10 years (2000–2010) the population has changed at a rate of 1.3%. Migration accounted for 2.6%, while births and deaths accounted for -2.6%.

Most of the population (as of 2000) speaks French (130 or 91%) as their first language, German is the second most common (11 or 8%) and Arabic is the third (1 or 0.7%).

As of 2008, the population was 47.5% male and 52.5% female. The population was made up of 74 Swiss men (46.8% of the population) and 1 (0.6%) non-Swiss men. There were 82 Swiss women (52%) and 1 (0.6%) non-Swiss woman. Of the population in the municipality, 75 (≈ 53%) were born in Rocourt and lived there in 2000. There were 32 or 22% who were born in the same canton, while 26 or 18% were born somewhere else in Switzerland, and 7 (≈ 5%) were born outside of Switzerland.

As of 2000, children and teenagers (0–19 years old) make up 22% of the population, while adults (20–64 years old) make up 56% and seniors (over 64 years old) make up 21%.

As of 2000, there were 51 people who were single and never married in the municipality. There were 75 married individuals, 9 widows or widowers and 7 individuals who are divorced.

As of 2000, there were 56 private households in the municipality, and an average of 2.5 persons per household. There were 12 households that consist of only one person and 7 households with five or more people. In 2000, a total of 54 apartments (69% of the total) were permanently occupied, while 18 apartments (23%) were seasonally occupied and 6 apartments (8%) were empty. As of 2009, the construction rate of new housing units was 6.3 new units per 1000 residents.

The historical population is given in the following chart:

== Sights ==
The entire village of Rocourt is designated as part of the Inventory of Swiss Heritage Sites

== Politics ==
In the 2007 federal election the most popular party was the CVP which received 43% of the vote. The next three most popular parties were the SPS (29%), the FDP (17%) and the SVP (8%). In the federal election, a total of 78 votes were cast, and the voter turnout was 62%.

== Economy ==
As of 2010, Rocourt had an unemployment rate of 2%. As of 2008, there were 29 people employed in the primary economic sector and about 10 businesses involved in this sector. No one was employed in the secondary sector. 7 people were employed in the tertiary sector, with 2 businesses in this sector. There were 76 residents of the municipality who were employed in some capacity, of which females made up 42% of the workforce.

In 2008 the total number of full-time equivalent jobs was 25. The number of jobs in the primary sector was 21, all of which were in agriculture. There were no jobs in the secondary sector. The number of jobs in the tertiary sector was 4.

In 2000, there were 2 workers who commuted into the municipality and 47 workers who commuted away. The municipality is a net exporter of workers, with about 23.5 workers leaving the municipality for every one entering. Of the working population, 9% used public transportation to get to work, and 62% used a private car.

== Religion ==
From the 2000 census, 113 (≈ 80%) were Roman Catholic, while 17 (≈ 12%) belonged to the Swiss Reformed Church. Of the rest of the population, there was 1 individual who belongs to another Christian church. There was 1 individual who was Islamic. There were 3 individuals who belonged to another church. 7 (≈ 5%) belonged to no church, are agnostic or atheist.

== Education ==
In Rocourt about 37 (≈ 26%) of the population have completed non-mandatory upper secondary education, and 14 (≈ 10%) have completed additional higher education (either university or a Fachhochschule). Of the 14 who completed tertiary schooling, 64% were Swiss men, 36% were Swiss women.

The Canton of Jura school system provides two year of non-obligatory Kindergarten, followed by six years of Primary school. This is followed by three years of obligatory lower Secondary school where the students are separated according to ability and aptitude. Following the lower Secondary students may attend a three or four year optional upper Secondary school followed by some form of Tertiary school or they may enter an apprenticeship.

During the 2009-10 school year, there were no students attending school in Rocourt.

As of 2000, there were 22 students in Rocourt who came from another municipality, while 12 residents attended schools outside the municipality.
