= Ajoie (disambiguation) =

Ajoie may refer to:

- Ajoie, a historic region roughly coinciding with Porrentruy District in northwestern Switzerland
- 249302 Ajoie, an asteroid
- HC Ajoie, a Swiss professional ice hockey team
