= Bressaucourt =

- Former municipality
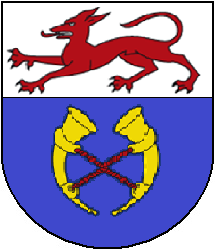
- Coat of arms
- Location of Bressaucourt
- Location within Switzerland Location within Canton of Jura
- Coordinates: 47°23′N 07°02′E
- Country: Switzerland
- Canton: Jura
- District: Porrentruy

Area
  - Total: 9.49 km^{2} (3.66 sq mi)
- Elevation: 536 m (1,759 ft)

Population (2010)
  - Total: 416
  - Density: 43.8/km^{2} (114/sq mi)
- Time zone: UTC+01:00 (CET)
  - Summer (DST): UTC+02:00 (CEST)
- Postal code: 2904
- SFOS number: 806
- ISO 3166 code: CH-JU
- Surrounded by: Chevenez, Courtedoux, Fontenais, Ocourt, Montancy(F)
- Website: SFSO statistics

Bressaucourt is a former municipality in the district of Porrentruy in the canton of Jura in Switzerland. On 1 January 2013 the former municipality of Bressaucourt merged into the municipality of Fontenais.

== History ==
Bressaucourt is first mentioned in 1139 as Bersalcurt.

== Geography ==
Before the merger, Bressaucourt had a total area of 9.5 km^{2} (3.7 mi^{2}). Of this area, 3.98 km^{2} (1.54 mi^{2}) or 41.9% is used for agricultural purposes, while 5.11 km^{2} (1.97 mi^{2}) or 53.7% is forested. Of the rest of the land, 0.4 km^{2} (0.15 mi^{2}) or 4.2% is settled (buildings or roads), 0.02 km^{2} (4.9 acres) or 0.2% is either rivers or lakes and 0.01 km^{2} (2.5 acres) or 0.1% is unproductive land.

Of the built up area, housing and buildings made up 2.4% and transportation infrastructure made up 0.9%. Out of the forested land, 50.9% of the total land area is heavily forested and 2.8% is covered with orchards or small clusters of trees. Of the agricultural land, 21.6% is used for growing crops and 13.9% is pastures, while 1.4% is used for orchards or vine crops and 5.0% is used for alpine pastures. All the water in the municipality is flowing water.

The former municipality is located in the Porrentruy district, on the French border.

=== Climate ===
Climate data for Bressaucourt (1981-2010)
Month	Jan	Feb	Mar	Apr	May	Jun	Jul	Aug	Sep	Oct	Nov	Dec	Year
Mean daily maximum °C (°F)	3.6 (38.5)	4.7 (40.5)	8.8 (47.8)	12.6 (54.7)	16.9 (62.4)	20.3 (68.5)	23.0 (73.4)	22.6 (72.7)	18.0 (64.4)	13.6 (56.5)	7.7 (45.9)	4.5 (40.1)	13.0 (55.4)
Daily mean °C (°F)	0.7 (33.3)	1.4 (34.5)	4.9 (40.8)	8.0 (46.4)	12.2 (54.0)	15.4 (59.7)	17.8 (64.0)	17.4 (63.3)	13.6 (56.5)	9.7 (49.5)	4.5 (40.1)	1.7 (35.1)	8.9 (48.0)
Mean daily minimum °C (°F)	−2.3 (27.9)	−1.9 (28.6)	1.1 (34.0)	3.7 (38.7)	7.7 (45.9)	10.7 (51.3)	12.9 (55.2)	12.8 (55.0)	9.6 (49.3)	6.2 (43.2)	1.4 (34.5)	−1.1 (30.0)	5.1 (41.2)
Average precipitation mm (inches)	67 (2.6)	66 (2.6)	81 (3.2)	82 (3.2)	118 (4.6)	100 (3.9)	93 (3.7)	105 (4.1)	100 (3.9)	101 (4.0)	87 (3.4)	91 (3.6)	1,090 (42.9)
Average snowfall cm (inches)	18.4 (7.2)	20 (7.9)	11.5 (4.5)	1.9 (0.7)	0 (0)	0 (0)	0 (0)	0 (0)	0 (0)	0 (0)	6.1 (2.4)	12 (4.7)	69.9 (27.5)
Average precipitation days (≥ 1.0 mm)	11.4	10.5	11.8	11.0	13.5	11.5	10.7	10.3	9.9	11.8	11.5	12.4	136.3
Average snowy days (≥ 1.0 cm)	4.4	4.8	2.6	0.4	0	0	0	0	0	0	1.3	3.3	16.8
Average relative humidity (%)	83	79	73	71	74	74	72	73	79	82	84	84	77
Mean monthly sunshine hours	63	81	116	151	174	201	233	214	149	108	68	50	1,609
Source: MeteoSwiss

== Coat of arms ==
The blazon of the municipal coat of arms is Azure, two Bugle-horns Or Strings interlaced Gules, on a Chief Argent a Dog Gules.

== Demographics ==
Bressaucourt has a population (as of 2010) of 416. As of 2008, 6.7% of the population are resident foreign nationals. Over the last 10 years (2000–2010) the population has changed at a rate of 6.1%. Migration accounted for 2.5%, while births and deaths accounted for 2.3%.

Most of the population (as of 2000) speaks French (333 or 89.5%) as their first language, German is the second most common (29 or 7.8%) and Italian is the third (2 or 0.5%).

As of 2008, the population was 49.4% male and 50.6% female. The population was made up of 189 Swiss men (45.3% of the population) and 17 (4.1%) non-Swiss men. There were 204 Swiss women (48.9%) and 7 (1.7%) non-Swiss women. Of the population in the municipality, 127 or about 34.1% were born in Bressaucourt and lived there in 2000. There were 122 or 32.8% who were born in the same canton, while 68 or 18.3% were born somewhere else in Switzerland, and 51 or 13.7% were born outside of Switzerland.

As of 2000, children and teenagers (0–19 years old) make up 28.5% of the population, while adults (20–64 years old) make up 58.1% and seniors (over 64 years old) make up 13.4%.

As of 2000, there were 153 people who were single and never married in the municipality. There were 172 married individuals, 28 widows or widowers and 19 individuals who are divorced.

As of 2000, there were 148 private households in the municipality, and an average of 2.4 persons per household. There were 43 households that consist of only one person and 17 households with five or more people. In 2000, a total of 141 apartments (89.2% of the total) were permanently occupied, while 11 apartments (7.0%) were seasonally occupied and 6 apartments (3.8%) were empty. As of 2009, the construction rate of new housing units was 9.6 new units per 1000 residents. The vacancy rate for the municipality, in 2010, was 3.37%.

The historical population is given in the following chart:

== Politics ==
In the 2007 federal election the most popular party was the SPS which received 50% of the vote. The next three most popular parties were the FDP (18.37%), the CVP (17.69%) and the SVP (12.24%). In the federal election, a total of 150 votes were cast, and the voter turnout was 51.0%.

== Economy ==
As of 2010, Bressaucourt had an unemployment rate of 1.2%. As of 2008, there were 20 people employed in the primary economic sector and about 9 businesses involved in this sector. 12 people were employed in the secondary sector and there were 3 businesses in this sector. 11 people were employed in the tertiary sector, with 8 businesses in this sector. There were 172 residents of the municipality who were employed in some capacity, of which females made up 47.7% of the workforce.

In 2008 the total number of full-time equivalent jobs was 36. The number of jobs in the primary sector was 15, all of which were in agriculture. The number of jobs in the secondary sector was 12 of which 6 or (50.0%) were in manufacturing and 6 (50.0%) were in construction. The number of jobs in the tertiary sector was 9. In the tertiary sector; 3 or 33.3% were in wholesale or retail sales or the repair of motor vehicles, 1 was in a hotel or restaurant, 2 or 22.2% were in education.

In 2000, there were 9 workers who commuted into the municipality and 135 workers who commuted away. The municipality is a net exporter of workers, with about 15.0 workers leaving the municipality for every one entering. Of the working population, 7.6% used public transportation to get to work, and 73.3% used a private car.

== Religion ==
From the 2000 census, 251 or 67.5% were Roman Catholic, while 62 or 16.7% belonged to the Swiss Reformed Church. Of the rest of the population, there was 1 member of an Orthodox church, and there were 8 individuals (or about 2.15% of the population) who belonged to another Christian church. There was 1 individual who was Islamic. There were 2 individuals who were Buddhist. 38 (or about 10.22% of the population) belonged to no church, are agnostic or atheist, and 13 individuals (or about 3.49% of the population) did not answer the question.

== Education ==
In Bressaucourt about 118 or (31.7%) of the population have completed non-mandatory upper secondary education, and 41 or (11.0%) have completed additional higher education (either university or a Fachhochschule). Of the 41 who completed tertiary schooling, 43.9% were Swiss men, 41.5% were Swiss women, 12.2% were non-Swiss men.

The Canton of Jura school system provides two year of non-obligatory Kindergarten, followed by six years of Primary school. This is followed by three years of obligatory lower Secondary school where the students are separated according to ability and aptitude. Following the lower Secondary students may attend a three or four year optional upper Secondary school followed by some form of Tertiary school or they may enter an apprenticeship.

During the 2009-10 school year, there were no students attending school in Bressaucourt.

As of 2000, there were 2 students in Bressaucourt who came from another municipality, while 35 residents attended schools outside the municipality.
