= Grandfontaine, Switzerland =

Grandfontaine
- Municipality
- Flag Coat of arms
- Location of Grandfontaine
- Location within Switzerland Location within Canton of Jura
- Coordinates: 47°23′N 06°56′E
- Country: Switzerland
- Canton: Jura
- District: Porrentruy

Government
  - Executive: Conseil communal with 5 members
  - Mayor: Maire; Sylvain Quiquerez (as of 2026)

Area
  - Total: 8.94 km^{2} (3.45 sq mi)
- Elevation: 529 m (1,736 ft)

Population (2020)
  - Total: 387
  - Density: 43.3/km^{2} (112/sq mi)
- Demonym: Gueillemetins
- Time zone: UTC+01:00 (CET)
  - Summer (DST): UTC+02:00 (CEST)
- Postal code: 2908
- SFOS number: 6792
- ISO 3166 code: CH-JU
- Localities: Grandfontaine
- Surrounded by: Damvant, Réclère, Roche-d'Or, Rocourt, Fahy, Abbévillers(F), Glay(F), Dannemarie(F)
- Website: www.grandfontaine.ch

Grandfontaine (French pronunciation: [ɡʁɑ̃fɔ̃tɛn]) is a municipality in the district of Porrentruy in the canton of Jura in Switzerland.

== History ==
Grandfontaine is first mentioned in 1136 as Granfontana.

== Geography ==
Aerial view (1950)

Grandfontaine has an area of 8.97 km^{2} (3.46 sq mi). Of this area, 5.78 km^{2} (2.23 mi^{2}) or 64.4% is used for agricultural purposes, while 2.54 km^{2} (0.98 mi^{2}) or 28.3% is forested. Of the rest of the land, 0.6 km^{2} (0.23 mi^{2}) or 6.7% is settled (buildings or roads) and 0.02 km^{2} (4.9 acres) or 0.2% is unproductive land.

Of the built up area, housing and buildings made up 3.8% and transportation infrastructure made up 1.7%. Out of the forested land, 25.7% of the total land area is heavily forested and 2.6% is covered with orchards or small clusters of trees. Of the agricultural land, 40.0% is used for growing crops and 23.1% is pastures, while 1.3% is used for orchards or vine crops.

The municipality is located in the Porrentruy district, in a small valley near the Porrentruy to Besançon road. The large fountain and the bath house, both from the 19th century, are located on the karst spring that gave this village its name.

== Coat of arms ==
The blazon of the municipal coat of arms is Or a Cross Sable between 20 billets of the last.

== Demographics ==
Grandfontaine has a population (as of December 2020) of 387. As of 2008, 3.4% of the population are resident foreign nationals. Over the last 10 years (2000–2010) the population has changed at a rate of 0.6%. Migration accounted for 2.2%, while births and deaths accounted for 3.4%.

Most of the population (as of 2000) speaks French (301 or 91.2%) as their first language, German is the second most common (28 or 8.5%) and English is the third (1 or 0.3%).

As of 2008, the population was 47.9% male and 52.1% female. The population was made up of 165 Swiss men (46.0% of the population) and 7 (1.9%) non-Swiss men. There were 181 Swiss women (50.4%) and 6 (1.7%) non-Swiss women. Of the population in the municipality, 194 or about 58.8% were born in Grandfontaine and lived there in 2000. There were 57 or 17.3% who were born in the same canton, while 43 or 13.0% were born somewhere else in Switzerland, and 28 or 8.5% were born outside of Switzerland.

As of 2000, children and teenagers (0–19 years old) make up 27.3% of the population, while adults (20–64 years old) make up 56.7% and seniors (over 64 years old) make up 16.1%.

As of 2000, there were 140 people who were single and never married in the municipality. There were 156 married individuals, 24 widows or widowers and 10 individuals who are divorced.

As of 2000, there were 126 private households in the municipality, and an average of 2.5 persons per household. There were 38 households that consist of only one person and 18 households with five or more people. In 2000, a total of 121 apartments (69.5% of the total) were permanently occupied, while 46 apartments (26.4%) were seasonally occupied and 7 apartments (4.0%) were empty. The vacancy rate for the municipality, in 2010, was 0.54%.

The historical population is given in the following chart:

== Politics ==
In the 2007 federal election the most popular party was the CVP which received 40.57% of the vote. The next three most popular parties were the SPS (31.13%), the SVP (13.21%) and the FDP (7.55%). In the federal election, a total of 106 votes were cast, and the voter turnout was 39.4%.

== Economy ==
As of 2010, Grandfontaine had an unemployment rate of 2.7%. As of 2008, there were 44 people employed in the primary economic sector and about 16 businesses involved in this sector. 36 people were employed in the secondary sector and there were 9 businesses in this sector. 37 people were employed in the tertiary sector, with 10 businesses in this sector. There were 154 residents of the municipality who were employed in some capacity, of which females made up 39.6% of the workforce.

In 2008 the total number of full-time equivalent jobs was 94. The number of jobs in the primary sector was 33, all of which were in agriculture. The number of jobs in the secondary sector was 31 of which 10 or (32.3%) were in manufacturing and 21 (67.7%) were in construction. The number of jobs in the tertiary sector was 30. In the tertiary sector; 21 or 70.0% were in wholesale or retail sales or the repair of motor vehicles, 3 or 10.0% were in a hotel or restaurant, 2 or 6.7% were in education.

In 2000, there were 32 workers who commuted into the municipality and 82 workers who commuted away. The municipality is a net exporter of workers, with about 2.6 workers leaving the municipality for every one entering. About 25.0% of the workforce coming into Grandfontaine are coming from outside Switzerland. Of the working population, 5.2% used public transportation to get to work, and 57.1% used a private car.

== Religion ==
From the 2000 census, 281 or 85.2% were Roman Catholic, while 19 or 5.8% belonged to the Swiss Reformed Church. Of the rest of the population, there were 12 individuals (or about 3.64% of the population) who belonged to another Christian church. 21 (or about 6.36% of the population) belonged to no church, are agnostic or atheist, and 3 individuals (or about 0.91% of the population) did not answer the question.

== Education ==
In Grandfontaine about 110 or (33.3%) of the population have completed non-mandatory upper secondary education, and 31 or (9.4%) have completed additional higher education (either university or a Fachhochschule). Of the 31 who completed tertiary schooling, 54.8% were Swiss men, 38.7% were Swiss women.

The Canton of Jura school system provides two year of non-obligatory Kindergarten, followed by six years of Primary school. This is followed by three years of obligatory lower Secondary school where the students are separated according to ability and aptitude. Following the lower Secondary students may attend a three or four year optional upper Secondary school followed by some form of Tertiary school or they may enter an apprenticeship.

During the 2009–10 school year, there were no students attending school in Grandfontaine.

As of 2000, there were 31 students in Grandfontaine who came from another municipality, while 40 residents attended schools outside the municipality.
