= Fontenais =

- Municipality
- Coat of arms
- Location of Fontenais
- Location within Switzerland Location within Canton of Jura
- Coordinates: 47°24′N 07°05′E
- Country: Switzerland
- Canton: Jura
- District: Porrentruy

Government
  - Executive: Conseil communal with 7 members
  - Mayor: Maire; Victor Egger (as of 2026)

Area
  - Total: 10.48 km^{2} (4.05 sq mi)
- Elevation: 458 m (1,503 ft)

Population (2003)
  - Total: 1,262
  - Density: 120.4/km^{2} (311.9/sq mi)
- Time zone: UTC+01:00 (CET)
  - Summer (DST): UTC+02:00 (CEST)
- Postal code: 2902
- SFOS number: 6790
- ISO 3166 code: CH-JU
- Localities: Villars-sur-Fontenais
- Surrounded by: Bressaucourt, Porrentruy, Cornol, Courgenay, Ocourt
- Website: www.fontenais.ch

Fontenais is a municipality in the district of Porrentruy in the canton of Jura in Switzerland. On 1 January 2013 the former municipality of Bressaucourt merged into the municipality of Fontenais.

== History ==
Fontenais is first mentioned in 1148 as Fonteneis.

== Geography ==
Aerial view (1950)

Fontenais has an area of 19.99 km^{2} (7.72 sq mi). Of this area, 5.11 km^{2} (1.97 mi^{2}) or 48.7% is used for agricultural purposes, while 4.56 km^{2} (1.76 mi^{2}) or 43.5% is forested. Of the rest of the land, 0.78 km^{2} (0.30 mi^{2}) or 7.4% is settled (buildings or roads) and 0.04 km^{2} (9.9 acres) or 0.4% is unproductive land.

Of the built up area, housing and buildings made up 4.9% and transportation infrastructure made up 1.6%. Out of the forested land, 41.8% of the total land area is heavily forested and 1.6% is covered with orchards or small clusters of trees. Of the agricultural land, 27.5% is used for growing crops and 19.0% is pastures, while 1.1% is used for orchards or vine crops and 1.1% is used for alpine pastures.

The municipality is located in the Porrentruy district, south of the city of Porrentruy. It stretches across a small valley to the slopes of the surrounding mountains, where the main village developed. It consists of the village of Fontenais and the hamlet of Villars-sur-Fontenais as well as scattered farm houses. Somewhere on the Le Chételat hill, the remains of an 11th-century castle are supposedly buried.

== Coat of arms ==
The blazon of the municipal coat of arms is Azure, a Fountain Argent, and on a Chief Or two Mullets [of Six] Gules. The fountain (French: fontaine) is an example of canting.

== Demographics ==
Fontenais has a population (as of December 2020) of 1,690. As of 2008, 6.5% of the population are resident foreign nationals. Over the last 10 years (2000–2010) the population has changed at a rate of -1.7%. Migration accounted for -2.4%, while births and deaths accounted for 0.6%.

Most of the population (as of 2000) speaks French (1,187 or 95.0%) as their first language, German is the second most common (35 or 2.8%) and Italian is the third (12 or 1.0%).

As of 2008, the population was 48.0% male and 52.0% female. The population was made up of 550 Swiss men (44.2% of the population) and 47 (3.8%) non-Swiss men. There were 604 Swiss women (48.6%) and 43 (3.5%) non-Swiss women. Of the population in the municipality, 436 or about 34.9% were born in Fontenais and lived there in 2000. There were 501 or 40.1% who were born in the same canton, while 130 or 10.4% were born somewhere else in Switzerland, and 138 or 11.0% were born outside of Switzerland.

As of 2000, children and teenagers (0–19 years old) make up 25% of the population, while adults (20–64 years old) make up 57.7% and seniors (over 64 years old) make up 17.3%.

As of 2000, there were 481 people who were single and never married in the municipality. There were 645 married individuals, 75 widows or widowers and 48 individuals who are divorced.

As of 2000, there were 509 private households in the municipality, and an average of 2.4 persons per household. There were 151 households that consist of only one person and 41 households with five or more people. In 2000, a total of 488 apartments (89.2% of the total) were permanently occupied, while 34 apartments (6.2%) were seasonally occupied and 25 apartments (4.6%) were empty. As of 2009, the construction rate of new housing units was 4 new units per 1000 residents. The vacancy rate for the municipality, in 2010, was 2.61%.

The historical population is given in the following chart:

== Politics ==
In the 2007 federal election the most popular party was the SPS which received 70.06% of the vote. The next three most popular parties were the CVP (15.54%), the SVP (6.75%) and the FDP (5.37%). In the federal election, a total of 617 votes were cast, and the voter turnout was 62.9%.

== Economy ==
As of 2010, Fontenais had an unemployment rate of 4.9%. As of 2008, there were 43 people employed in the primary economic sector and about 15 businesses involved in this sector. 39 people were employed in the secondary sector and there were 13 businesses in this sector. 74 people were employed in the tertiary sector, with 19 businesses in this sector. There were 593 residents of the municipality who were employed in some capacity, of which females made up 44.7% of the workforce.

In 2008 the total number of full-time equivalent jobs was 124. The number of jobs in the primary sector was 32, of which 31 were in agriculture and 1 was in forestry or lumber production. The number of jobs in the secondary sector was 36 of which 22 or (61.1%) were in manufacturing and 14 (38.9%) were in construction. The number of jobs in the tertiary sector was 56. In the tertiary sector; 18 or 32.1% were in wholesale or retail sales or the repair of motor vehicles, 6 or 10.7% were in the movement and storage of goods, 3 or 5.4% were in a hotel or restaurant, 4 or 7.1% were the insurance or financial industry, 2 or 3.6% were technical professionals or scientists, 8 or 14.3% were in education and 3 or 5.4% were in health care.

In 2000, there were 58 workers who commuted into the municipality and 454 workers who commuted away. The municipality is a net exporter of workers, with about 7.8 workers leaving the municipality for every one entering. About 22.4% of the workforce coming into Fontenais are coming from outside Switzerland. Of the working population, 6.2% used public transportation to get to work, and 73.4% used a private car.

== Religion ==
From the 2000 census, 904 or 72.4% were Roman Catholic, while 145 or 11.6% belonged to the Swiss Reformed Church. Of the rest of the population, there was 1 member of an Orthodox church, and there were 79 individuals (or about 6.33% of the population) who belonged to another Christian church. There were 15 (or about 1.20% of the population) who were Islamic. There were 1 individual who belonged to another church. 85 (or about 6.81% of the population) belonged to no church, are agnostic or atheist, and 58 individuals (or about 4.64% of the population) did not answer the question.

== Education ==
In Fontenais about 391 or (31.3%) of the population have completed non-mandatory upper secondary education, and 107 or (8.6%) have completed additional higher education (either university or a Fachhochschule). Of the 107 who completed tertiary schooling, 63.6% were Swiss men, 29.0% were Swiss women, 4.7% were non-Swiss men.

The Canton of Jura school system provides two years of non-obligatory Kindergarten, followed by six years of Primary school. This is followed by three years of obligatory lower Secondary school where the students are separated according to ability and aptitude. Following the lower Secondary students may attend a three or four-year optional upper Secondary school followed by some form of Tertiary school or they may enter an apprenticeship.

During the 2009-10 school year, there were a total of 104 students attending 6 classes in Fontenais. There was one kindergarten class with a total of 21 students in the municipality. The municipality had 5 primary classes and 83 students. There are only nine Secondary schools in the canton, so all the students from Fontenais attend their secondary school in another municipality.

As of 2000, there were 3 students in Fontenais who came from another municipality, while 95 residents attended schools outside the municipality.
