= Courchavon =

- Municipality
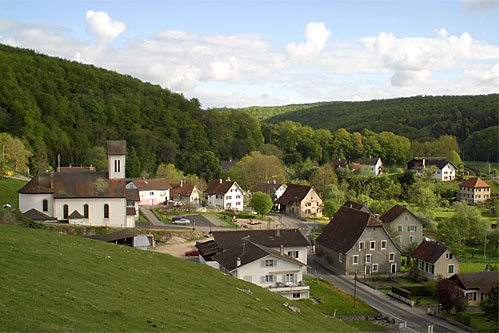
- Courchavon village

- Flag Coat of arms
- Location of Courchavon
- Location within Switzerland Location within Canton of Jura
- Coordinates: 47°26′N 07°03′E
- Country: Switzerland
- Canton: Jura
- District: Porrentruy

Government
  - Executive: Conseil with 7 members
  - Mayor: Maire; Julien Lallau (as of 2026)

Area
  - Total: 6.23 km^{2} (2.41 sq mi)
- Elevation: 407 m (1,335 ft)

Population (2003)
  - Total: 291
  - Density: 46.7/km^{2} (121/sq mi)
- Time zone: UTC+01:00 (CET)
  - Summer (DST): UTC+02:00 (CEST)
- Postal code: 2922
- SFOS number: 6783
- ISO 3166 code: CH-JU
- Surrounded by: Porrentruy, Bure, Courtemaîche, Coeuve
- Website: https://courchavon-mormont.ch/

Courchavon (French pronunciation: [kuʁʃavɔ̃]; Frainc-Comtou: Cortchavon) is a municipality in the district of Porrentruy in the canton of Jura in Switzerland.

== History ==
Courchavon is first mentioned in 1279 as Corchavon.

== Geography ==
Courchavon has an area of 6.19 km^{2} (2.39 sq mi). Of this area, 1.88 km^{2} (0.73 mi^{2}) or 30.4% is used for agricultural purposes, while 3.74 km^{2} (1.44 mi^{2}) or 60.4% is forested. Of the rest of the land, 0.47 km^{2} (0.18 mi^{2}) or 7.6% is settled (buildings or roads), 0.06 km^{2} (15 acres) or 1.0% is either rivers or lakes and 0.1 km^{2} (25 acres) or 1.6% is unproductive land.

Of the built up area, housing and buildings made up 2.4% and transportation infrastructure made up 3.7%. Out of the forested land, 59.1% of the total land area is heavily forested and 1.3% is covered with orchards or small clusters of trees. Of the agricultural land, 12.8% is used for growing crops and 16.6% is pastures. All the water in the municipality is flowing water.

The municipality is located in the Porrentruy district, on the left bank of the Allaine river. It consists of the village of Courchavon and the hamlet of Mormont.

== Coat of arms ==
The blazon of the municipal coat of arms is Azure, a Mullet [of Six] Or in chief between a Saltire of the same.

== Demographics ==
Courchavon has a population (as of December 2020) of 314. As of 2008, 4.4% of the population are resident foreign nationals. Over the last 10 years (2000–2010) the population has changed at a rate of 1.7%. Migration accounted for -1.3%, while births and deaths accounted for 2.3%.

Most of the population (as of 2000) speaks French (280 or 95.6%) as their first language, German is the second most common (10 or 3.4%) and Portuguese is the third (2 or 0.7%).

As of 2008, the population was 47.9% male and 52.1% female. The population was made up of 134 Swiss men (43.9% of the population) and 12 (3.9%) non-Swiss men. There were 153 Swiss women (50.2%) and 6 (2.0%) non-Swiss women. Of the population in the municipality, 142 or about 48.5% were born in Courchavon and lived there in 2000. There were 95 or 32.4% who were born in the same canton, while 27 or 9.2% were born somewhere else in Switzerland, and 25 or 8.5% were born outside of Switzerland.

As of 2000, children and teenagers (0–19 years old) make up 30.4% of the population, while adults (20–64 years old) make up 52.2% and seniors (over 64 years old) make up 17.4%.

As of 2000, there were 120 people who were single and never married in the municipality. There were 138 married individuals, 27 widows or widowers and 8 individuals who are divorced.

As of 2000, there were 109 private households in the municipality, and an average of 2.7 persons per household. There were 29 households that consist of only one person and 16 households with five or more people. In 2000, a total of 106 apartments (85.5% of the total) were permanently occupied, while 10 apartments (8.1%) were seasonally occupied and 8 apartments (6.5%) were empty. As of 2009, the construction rate of new housing units was 6.6 new units per 1000 residents. The vacancy rate for the municipality, in 2010, was 5.19%.

The historical population is given in the following chart:

== Politics ==
In the 2007 federal election the most popular party was the CVP which received 70.93% of the vote. The next three most popular parties were the SPS (12.8%), the FDP (8.65%) and the SVP (6.92%). In the federal election, a total of 148 votes were cast, and the voter turnout was 68.8%.

== Economy ==
As of 2010, Courchavon had an unemployment rate of 3.8%. As of 2008, there were 22 people employed in the primary economic sector and about 6 businesses involved in this sector. 127 people were employed in the secondary sector and there were 8 businesses in this sector. 29 people were employed in the tertiary sector, with 8 businesses in this sector. There were 118 residents of the municipality who were employed in some capacity, of which females made up 40.7% of the workforce.

In 2008 the total number of full-time equivalent jobs was 163. The number of jobs in the primary sector was 14, all of which were in agriculture. The number of jobs in the secondary sector was 124 of which 89 or (71.8%) were in manufacturing and 35 (28.2%) were in construction. The number of jobs in the tertiary sector was 25. In the tertiary sector; 4 or 16.0% were in wholesale or retail sales or the repair of motor vehicles, 8 or 32.0% were in a hotel or restaurant, 4 or 16.0% were technical professionals or scientists, 1 was in education.

In 2000, there were 95 workers who commuted into the municipality and 80 workers who commuted away. The municipality is a net importer of workers, with about 1.2 workers entering the municipality for every one leaving. About 26.3% of the workforce coming into Courchavon are coming from outside Switzerland. Of the working population, 14.4% used public transportation to get to work, and 61.9% used a private car.

== Religion ==
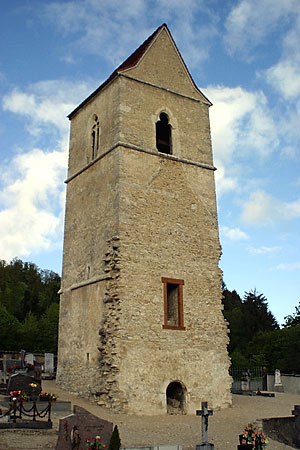
Bell tower of a demolished church in Courchavon

From the 2000 census, 253 or 86.3% were Roman Catholic, while 15 or 5.1% belonged to the Swiss Reformed Church. Of the rest of the population, there were 26 individuals (or about 8.87% of the population) who belonged to another Christian church. There were 1 individual who belonged to another church. 10 (or about 3.41% of the population) belonged to no church, are agnostic or atheist, and 1 individuals (or about 0.34% of the population) did not answer the question.

== Education ==
In Courchavon about 85 or (29.0%) of the population have completed non-mandatory upper secondary education, and 10 or (3.4%) have completed additional higher education (either university or a Fachhochschule). Of the 10 who completed tertiary schooling, 70.0% were Swiss men, 30.0% were Swiss women.

The Canton of Jura school system provides two year of non-obligatory Kindergarten, followed by six years of Primary school. This is followed by three years of obligatory lower Secondary school where the students are separated according to ability and aptitude. Following the lower Secondary students may attend a three or four year optional upper Secondary school followed by some form of Tertiary school or they may enter an apprenticeship.

During the 2009-10 school year, there were no students attending school in Courchavon.

As of 2000, there were 6 students in Courchavon who came from another municipality, while 52 residents attended schools outside the municipality.

== Transportation ==
The municipality has a railway station, Courchavon. It is located on the Delémont–Delle line and has regular service to Biel/Bienne and Meroux (in France).
