= Courtedoux =

- Municipality
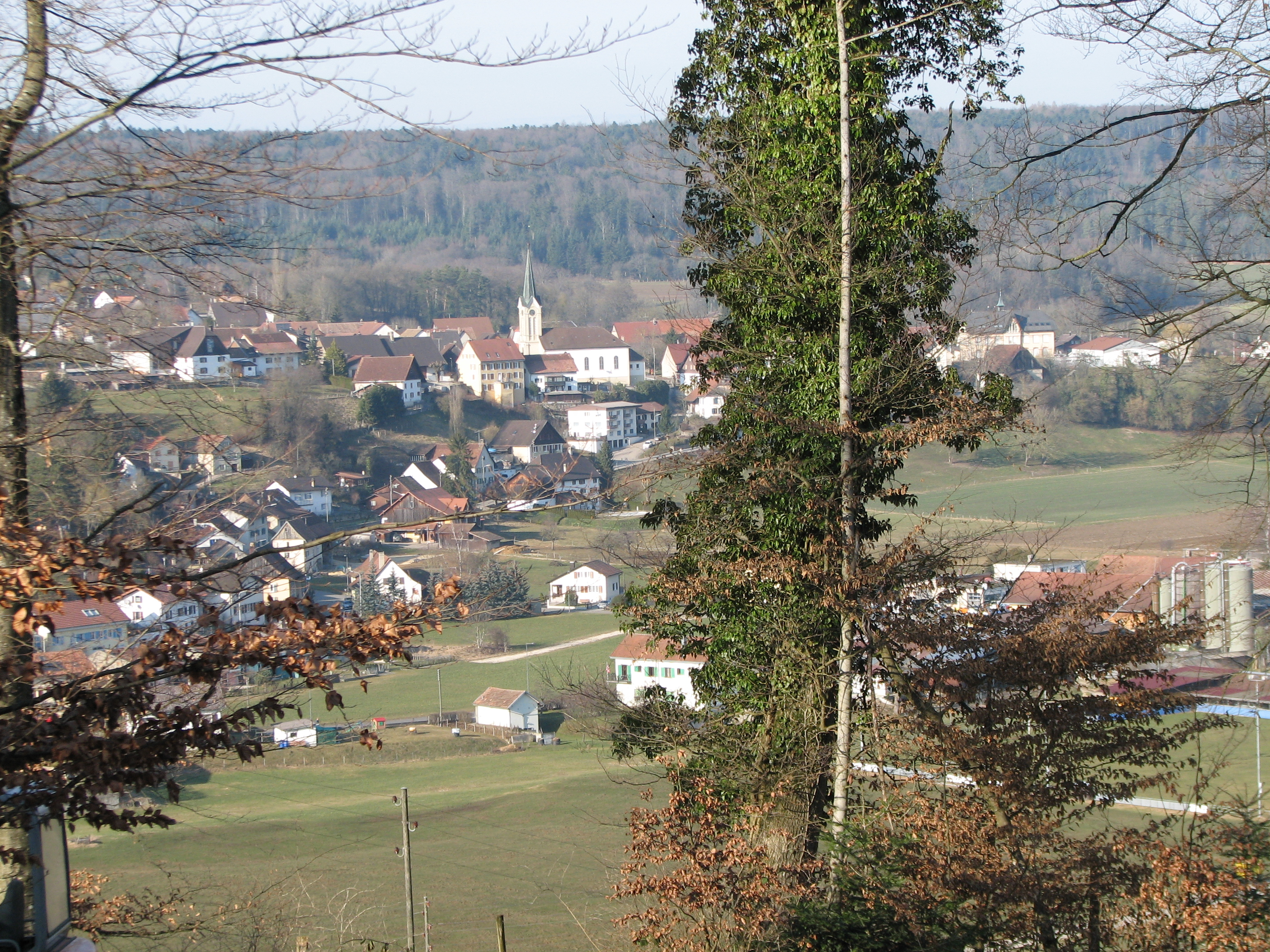
- Courtedoux village

- Coat of arms
- Location of Courtedoux
- Location within Switzerland Location within Canton of Jura
- Coordinates: 47°25′N 07°02′E
- Country: Switzerland
- Canton: Jura
- District: Porrentruy

Government
  - Executive: Conseil communal with 7 members
  - Mayor: Maire; Isabelle Tallat (as of 2026)

Area
  - Total: 8.13 km^{2} (3.14 sq mi)
- Elevation: 470 m (1,540 ft)

Population (2003)
  - Total: 755
  - Density: 92.9/km^{2} (241/sq mi)
- Time zone: UTC+01:00 (CET)
  - Summer (DST): UTC+02:00 (CEST)
- Postal code: 2905
- SFOS number: 6785
- ISO 3166 code: CH-JU
- Surrounded by: Porrentruy, Bressaucourt, Chevenez, Bure
- Website: http://www.courtedoux.ch SFSO statistics

Courtedoux (French pronunciation: [kuʁtədu]; Frainc-Comtou: Codgedoux) is a municipality in the district of Porrentruy of the Canton of Jura, Switzerland.

== History ==
Courtedoux is first mentioned in 814 as Curtis Udulphi.

== Geography ==
Aerial view (1950)

Courtedoux has an area of 8.21 km^{2} (3.17 sq mi). Of this area, 4.27 km^{2} (1.65 mi^{2}) or 51.9% is used for agricultural purposes, while 3.08 km^{2} (1.19 mi^{2}) or 37.5% is forested. Of the rest of the land, 0.8 km^{2} (0.31 mi^{2}) or 9.7% is settled (buildings or roads).

Of the built up area, housing and buildings made up 3.5% and transportation infrastructure made up 2.7%. Power and water infrastructure as well as other special developed areas made up 2.9% of the area Out of the forested land, 35.8% of the total land area is heavily forested and 1.7% is covered with orchards or small clusters of trees. Of the agricultural land, 29.7% is used for growing crops and 19.5% is pastures and 2.2% is used for alpine pastures.

The municipality is located in the Porrentruy district, on a rise above the Creugenat valley.

== Coat of arms ==
The blazon of the municipal coat of arms is Or, three Piles issuant from sinister shortened Azure, and on a chief of the last a Wolf passant of the first langued and armed Gules.

== Demographics ==
Courtedoux has a population (as of December 2020) of 755. As of 2008, 5.8% of the population are resident foreign nationals. Over the last 10 years (2000–2010) the population has changed at a rate of -3.1%. Migration accounted for 0.1%, while births and deaths accounted for -3.5%.

Most of the population (as of 2000) speaks French (709 or 95.9%) as their first language, German is the second most common (18 or 2.4%) and Portuguese is the third (4 or 0.5%). There are 3 people who speak Italian and 1 person who speaks Romansh.

As of 2008, the population was 46.3% male and 53.7% female. The population was made up of 307 Swiss men (42.5% of the population) and 27 (3.7%) non-Swiss men. There were 374 Swiss women (51.8%) and 14 (1.9%) non-Swiss women. Of the population in the municipality, 268 or about 36.3% were born in Courtedoux and lived there in 2000. There were 279 or 37.8% who were born in the same canton, while 85 or 11.5% were born somewhere else in Switzerland, and 86 or 11.6% were born outside of Switzerland.

As of 2000, children and teenagers (0–19 years old) make up 24% of the population, while adults (20–64 years old) make up 57.8% and seniors (over 64 years old) make up 18.3%.

As of 2000, there were 283 people who were single and never married in the municipality. There were 385 married individuals, 47 widows or widowers and 24 individuals who are divorced.

As of 2000, there were 294 private households in the municipality, and an average of 2.5 persons per household. There were 75 households that consist of only one person and 24 households with five or more people. In 2000, a total of 288 apartments (90.0% of the total) were permanently occupied, while 21 apartments (6.6%) were seasonally occupied and 11 apartments (3.4%) were empty. As of 2009, the construction rate of new housing units was 1.4 new units per 1000 residents. The vacancy rate for the municipality, in 2010, was 1.18%.

The historical population is given in the following chart:

== Politics ==
In the 2007 federal election the most popular party was the CVP which received 36.78% of the vote. The next three most popular parties were the SPS (29.03%), the FDP (17.5%) and the SVP (12.92%). In the federal election, a total of 257 votes were cast, and the voter turnout was 45.2%.

== Economy ==
As of 2010, Courtedoux had an unemployment rate of 3.4%. As of 2008, there were 32 people employed in the primary economic sector and about 11 businesses involved in this sector. 113 people were employed in the secondary sector and there were 7 businesses in this sector. 43 people were employed in the tertiary sector, with 13 businesses in this sector. There were 348 residents of the municipality who were employed in some capacity, of which females made up 43.1% of the workforce.

In 2008 the total number of full-time equivalent jobs was 166. The number of jobs in the primary sector was 22, of which 19 were in agriculture and 3 were in forestry or lumber production. The number of jobs in the secondary sector was 108 of which 104 or (96.3%) were in manufacturing and 4 (3.7%) were in construction. The number of jobs in the tertiary sector was 36. In the tertiary sector; 10 or 27.8% were in wholesale or retail sales or the repair of motor vehicles, 6 or 16.7% were in the movement and storage of goods, 2 or 5.6% were in a hotel or restaurant, 4 or 11.1% were in the information industry, 3 or 8.3% were technical professionals or scientists, 4 or 11.1% were in education.

In 2000, there were 77 workers who commuted into the municipality and 260 workers who commuted away. The municipality is a net exporter of workers, with about 3.4 workers leaving the municipality for every one entering. About 13.0% of the workforce coming into Courtedoux are coming from outside Switzerland. Of the working population, 6.6% used public transportation to get to work, and 78.2% used a private car.

== Religion ==
From the 2000 census, 567 or 76.7% were Roman Catholic, while 85 or 11.5% belonged to the Swiss Reformed Church. Of the rest of the population, there were 2 members of an Orthodox church (or about 0.27% of the population), and there were 70 individuals (or about 9.47% of the population) who belonged to another Christian church. There were 3 (or about 0.41% of the population) who were Islamic. 33 (or about 4.47% of the population) belonged to no church, are agnostic or atheist, and 14 individuals (or about 1.89% of the population) did not answer the question.

== Education ==
In Courtedoux about 252 or (34.1%) of the population have completed non-mandatory upper secondary education, and 74 or (10.0%) have completed additional higher education (either university or a Fachhochschule). Of the 74 who completed tertiary schooling, 70.3% were Swiss men, 20.3% were Swiss women and 8.1% were non-Swiss women.

The Canton of Jura school system provides two year of non-obligatory Kindergarten, followed by six years of Primary school. This is followed by three years of obligatory lower Secondary school where the students are separated according to ability and aptitude. Following the lower Secondary students may attend a three or four year optional upper Secondary school followed by some form of Tertiary school or they may enter an apprenticeship.

During the 2009-10 school year, there were no students attending school in Courtedoux.

As of 2000, there were 5 students in Courtedoux who came from another municipality, while 53 residents attended schools outside the municipality.
