= Bure, Switzerland =

Bure
- Municipality
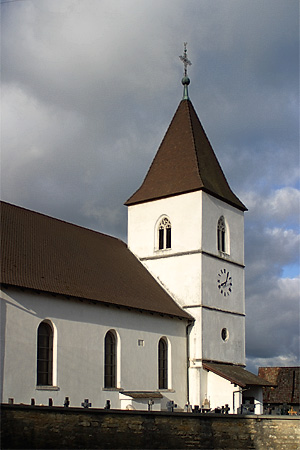
- Bure village church

- Coat of arms
- Location of Bure
- Location within Switzerland Location within Canton of Jura
- Coordinates: 47°27′N 07°00′E
- Country: Switzerland
- Canton: Jura
- District: Porrentruy

Government
  - Executive: Conseil communal with 5 members
  - Mayor: Maire; Michel Vallat (as of 2026)

Area
  - Total: 13.69 km^{2} (5.29 sq mi)
- Elevation: 587 m (1,926 ft)

Population (2003)
  - Total: 687
  - Density: 50.2/km^{2} (130/sq mi)
- Time zone: UTC+01:00 (CET)
  - Summer (DST): UTC+02:00 (CEST)
- Postal code: 2915
- SFOS number: 6778
- ISO 3166 code: CH-JU
- Surrounded by: Buix, Courtemaîche, Courchavon, Porrentruy, Courtedoux, Chevenez, Fahy, Croix (F), Villars-le-Sec (F)
- Website: www.bure.ch

Bure (French pronunciation: [byʁ]) is a municipality in the district of Porrentruy in the canton of Jura in Switzerland. It lies in very close proximity to the border with France.

== History ==
Bure is first mentioned in 1139 as Bures. The municipality was formerly known by its German name Burnen, however, that name is no longer used.

== Geography ==
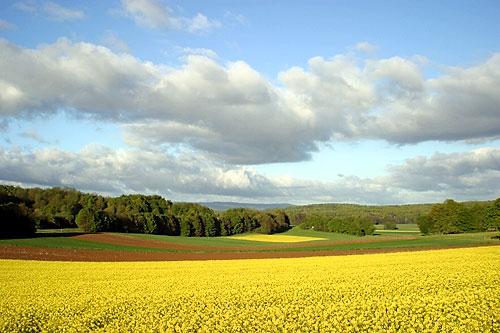
Fields outside Bure

Aerial view (1950)

Bure has an area of 13.68 km^{2} (5.28 sq mi). Of this area, 6.09 km^{2} (2.35 mi^{2}) or 44.5% is used for agricultural purposes, while 3.82 km^{2} (1.47 mi^{2}) or 27.9% is forested. Of the rest of the land, 1.82 km^{2} (0.70 mi^{2}) or 13.3% is settled (buildings or roads) and 1.97 km^{2} (0.76 mi^{2}) or 14.4% is unproductive land.

Of the built up area, housing and buildings made up 3.0% and transportation infrastructure made up 7.7%. Power and water infrastructure as well as other special developed areas made up 2.0% of the area Out of the forested land, 26.1% of the total land area is heavily forested and 1.8% is covered with orchards or small clusters of trees. Of the agricultural land, 29.3% is used for growing crops and 14.1% is pastures, while 1.1% is used for orchards or vine crops. Of the unproductive areas, 12.0% is unproductive vegetation and 2.4% is too rocky for vegetation.

The municipality is located in the Porrentruy district, on the French border.

== Coat of arms ==
The blazon of the municipal coat of arms is Gules, a Pig salient Argent.

== Demographics ==
Bure has a population (as of December 2020) of 645. As of 2008, 3.7% of the population are resident foreign nationals. Over the last 10 years (2000–2010) the population has changed at a rate of -2.1%. Migration accounted for -1.4%, while births and deaths accounted for 0%.

Most of the population (as of 2000) speaks French (670 or 98.0%) as their first language, German is the second most common (13 or 1.9%) and Italian is the third (1 or 0.1%).

As of 2008, the population was 51.2% male and 48.8% female. The population was made up of 333 Swiss men (48.6% of the population) and 18 (2.6%) non-Swiss men. There were 324 Swiss women (47.3%) and 10 (1.5%) non-Swiss women. Of the population in the municipality, 367 or about 53.7% were born in Bure and lived there in 2000. There were 198 or 28.9% who were born in the same canton, while 54 or 7.9% were born somewhere else in Switzerland, and 48 or 7.0% were born outside of Switzerland.

As of 2000, children and teenagers (0–19 years old) make up 26.6% of the population, while adults (20–64 years old) make up 60.1% and seniors (over 64 years old) make up 13.3%.

As of 2000, there were 282 people who were single and never married in the municipality. There were 330 married individuals, 57 widows or widowers and 15 individuals who are divorced.

As of 2000, there were 266 private households in the municipality, and an average of 2.5 persons per household. There were 88 households that consist of only one person and 32 households with five or more people. In 2000, a total of 250 apartments (90.6% of the total) were permanently occupied, while 15 apartments (5.4%) were seasonally occupied and 11 apartments (4.0%) were empty. As of 2009, the construction rate of new housing units was 1.5 new units per 1000 residents. The vacancy rate for the municipality, in 2010, was 3.68%.

The historical population is given in the following chart:

== Politics ==
In the 2007 federal election the most popular party was the CVP which received 46.67% of the vote. The next three most popular parties were the FDP (25.23%), the SVP (16.22%) and the SPS (10.09%). In the federal election, a total of 280 votes were cast, and the voter turnout was 50.9%.

== Economy ==
As of 2010, Bure had an unemployment rate of 5.1%. As of 2008, there were 30 people employed in the primary economic sector and about 11 businesses involved in this sector. 31 people were employed in the secondary sector and there were 9 businesses in this sector. 115 people were employed in the tertiary sector, with 15 businesses in this sector. There were 315 residents of the municipality who were employed in some capacity, of which females made up 39.4% of the workforce.

In 2008 the total number of full-time equivalent jobs was 143. The number of jobs in the primary sector was 27, all of which were in agriculture. The number of jobs in the secondary sector was 29 of which 17 or (58.6%) were in manufacturing and 12 (41.4%) were in construction. The number of jobs in the tertiary sector was 87. In the tertiary sector; 17 or 19.5% were in wholesale or retail sales or the repair of motor vehicles, 3 or 3.4% were in the movement and storage of goods, 3 or 3.4% were in a hotel or restaurant, 7 or 8.0% were technical professionals or scientists, 2 or 2.3% were in education and 23 or 26.4% were in health care.

In 2000, there were 107 workers who commuted into the municipality and 196 workers who commuted away. The municipality is a net exporter of workers, with about 1.8 workers leaving the municipality for every one entering. About 15.9% of the workforce coming into Bure are coming from outside Switzerland. Of the working population, 6% used public transportation to get to work, and 72.7% used a private car.

== Religion ==
From the 2000 census, 606 or 88.6% were Roman Catholic, while 40 or 5.8% belonged to the Swiss Reformed Church. Of the rest of the population, there were 3 members of an Orthodox church (or about 0.44% of the population). 20 (or about 2.92% of the population) belonged to no church, are agnostic or atheist, and 15 individuals (or about 2.19% of the population) did not answer the question.

== Education ==
In Bure about 211 or (30.8%) of the population have completed non-mandatory upper secondary education, and 50 or (7.3%) have completed additional higher education (either university or a Fachhochschule). Of the 50 who completed tertiary schooling, 70.0% were Swiss men, 24.0% were Swiss women.

The Canton of Jura school system provides two year of non-obligatory Kindergarten, followed by six years of Primary school. This is followed by three years of obligatory lower Secondary school where the students are separated according to ability and aptitude. Following the lower Secondary students may attend a three or four year optional upper Secondary school followed by some form of Tertiary school or they may enter an apprenticeship.

During the 2009-10 school year, there were a total of 17 students attending one class in Bure. There was one kindergarten class with a total of 17 students in the municipality. The municipality had no primary school classes, all the students attended school in a neighboring school. There are only nine Secondary schools in the canton, so all the students from Bure attend their secondary school in another municipality.

As of 2000, there were 5 students in Bure who came from another municipality, while 47 residents attended schools outside the municipality.
