= Montjoie-le-Château =

- Commune
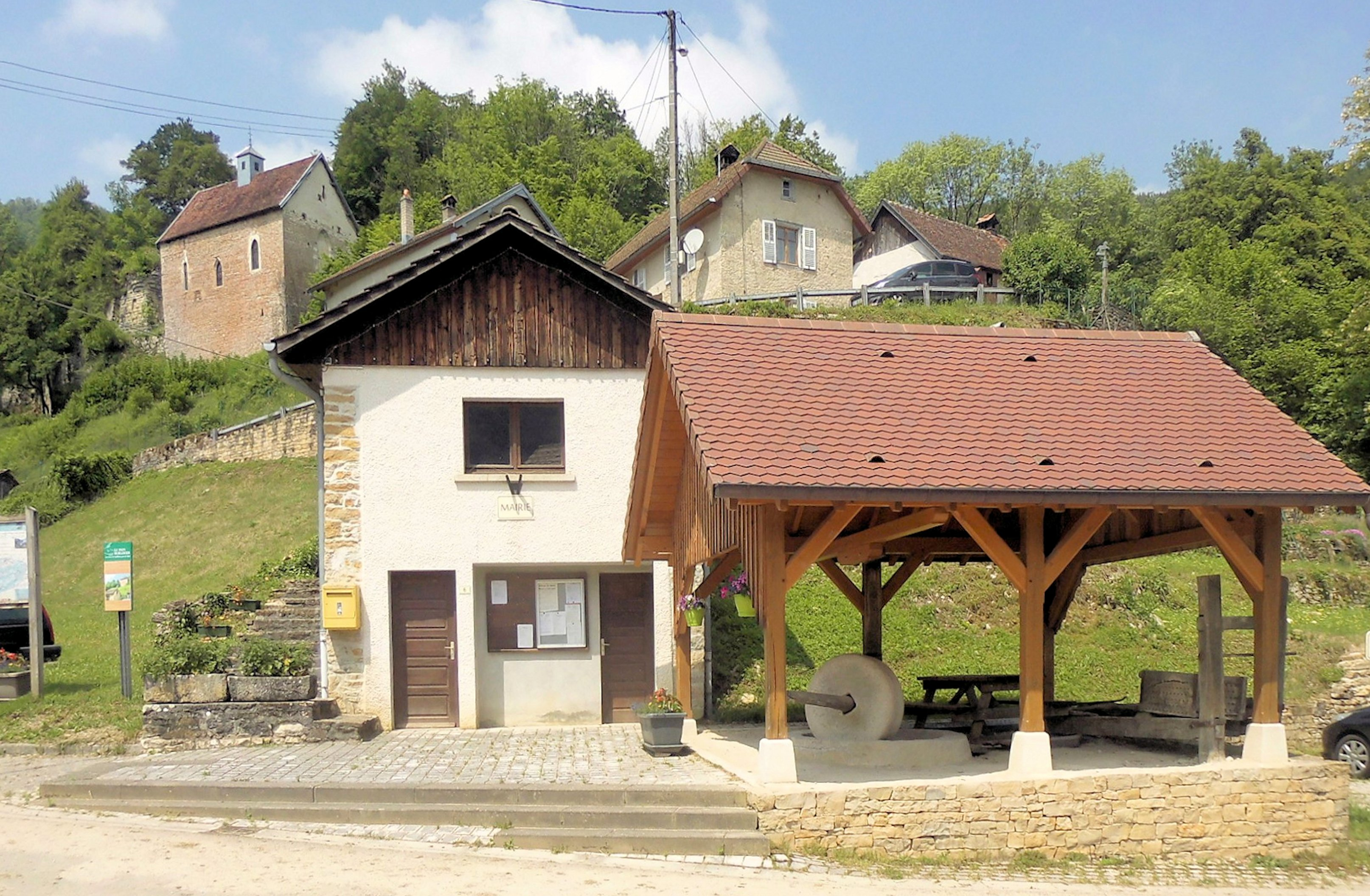
- The town hall in Montjoie-le-Château
- Location of Montjoie-le-Château
- Location within France Location within Bourgogne-Franche-Comté
- Coordinates: 47°21′02″N 6°54′09″E
- Country: France
- Region: Bourgogne-Franche-Comté
- Department: Doubs
- Arrondissement: Montbéliard
- Canton: Maîche

Government
  - Mayor (2020–2026): Claude Martelet
- Area^{1}: 5.39 km^{2} (2.08 sq mi)
- Highest elevation: 773 m (2,536 ft)
- Lowest elevation: 395 m (1,296 ft)
- Population (2023): 23
  - Density: 4.3/km^{2} (11/sq mi)
- Time zone: UTC+01:00 (CET)
  - Summer (DST): UTC+02:00 (CEST)
- INSEE/Postal code: 25402 /25190
- ^{1} French Land Register data, which excludes lakes, ponds, glaciers > 1 km^{2} (0.386 sq mi or 247 acres) and river estuaries.

Montjoie-le-Château (French pronunciation: [mɔ̃ʒwa l(ə) ʃɑto]; German previously: Frohberg) is a commune in the Doubs department in the Bourgogne-Franche-Comté region in eastern France.

== Population ==
Historical population
Year	Pop.	±% p.a.
1968	29	—
1975	23	−3.26%
1982	17	−4.23%
1990	21	+2.68%
1999	22	+0.52%
2007	26	+2.11%
2012	33	+4.88%
2017	27	−3.93%
2023	23	−2.64%
Source: INSEE

== See also ==
- Communes of the Doubs department
