= Fahy, Switzerland =

Fahy
- Municipality
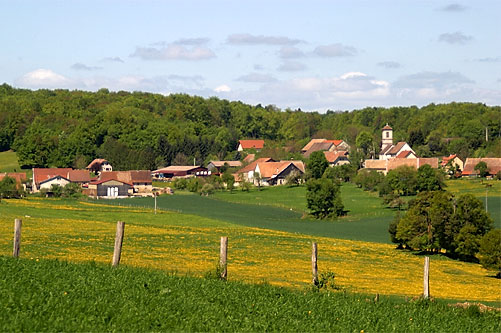
- Fahy village

- Flag Coat of arms
- Location of Fahy
- Location within Switzerland Location within Canton of Jura
- Coordinates: 47°25′N 06°57′E
- Country: Switzerland
- Canton: Jura
- District: Porrentruy

Government
  - Executive: Conseil communal with 5 members
  - Mayor: Maire; Antonio Dominguez (as of 2026)

Area
  - Total: 7.78 km^{2} (3.00 sq mi)
- Elevation: 567 m (1,860 ft)

Population (347)
  - Total: 347
  - Density: 44.6/km^{2} (116/sq mi)
- Time zone: UTC+01:00 (CET)
  - Summer (DST): UTC+02:00 (CEST)
- Postal code: 2916
- SFOS number: 6789
- ISO 3166 code: CH-JU
- Surrounded by: Grandfontaine, Rocourt, Chevenez, Bure, Abbévillers (F), Croix (F)
- Website: fahy.ch

Fahy is a municipality in the district of Porrentruy in the canton of Jura in Switzerland.

== History ==
It was mentioned in 1177 as Fahyl when it was one of the possessions of the priory of Lanthenans. In 1477, the bishop of Basel affirmed the rights of the village. In 1483 it was mentioned as Fahyt.

The village was under the jurisdiction of the bishop of Basel until the end of the 'Ancien Régime'. The village has remained essentially agricultural until 1950. It has undergone modest industrialisation, with the introduction of a Peugeot parts plant. The local church the Church of Saint-Pierre was constructed in 1787-1788 based on the plans of the architect Pierre Francois Paris.

== Geography ==
Aerial view (1950)

Fahy has an area of 7.78 km^{2} (3.00 sq mi). Of this area, 4.12 km^{2} (1.59 mi^{2}) or 53.0% is used for agricultural purposes, while 1.99 km^{2} (0.77 mi^{2}) or 25.6% is forested. Of the rest of the land, 0.67 km^{2} (0.26 mi^{2}) or 8.6% is settled (buildings or roads) and 1 km^{2} (0.39 mi^{2}) or 12.9% is unproductive land.

Of the built up area, housing and buildings made up 3.7% and transportation infrastructure made up 3.3%. Out of the forested land, 23.5% of the total land area is heavily forested and 2.1% is covered with orchards or small clusters of trees. Of the agricultural land, 37.5% is used for growing crops and 13.6% is pastures, while 1.8% is used for orchards or vine crops. Of the unproductive areas, 10.3% is unproductive vegetation and 2.6% is too rocky for vegetation.

The municipality is located in the Porrentruy district, on border with France, near Montbéliard.

== Coat of arms ==
The blazon of the municipal coat of arms is Argent, a Beech Tree Vert trunked and eradicated proper issuant from a Mount of the second.

== Demographics ==
Fahy has a population (as of December 2020) of 347. As of 2008, 5.1% of the population are resident foreign nationals. Over the last 10 years (2000–2010) the population has changed at a rate of -12.4%. Migration accounted for -6.6%, while births and deaths accounted for -1%.

Most of the population (as of 2000) speaks French (369 or 95.6%) as their first language, German is the second most common (7 or 1.8%) and Italian is the third (6 or 1.6%).

As of 2008, the population was 49.3% male and 50.7% female. The population was made up of 165 Swiss men (46.0% of the population) and 12 (3.3%) non-Swiss men. There were 176 Swiss women (49.0%) and 6 (1.7%) non-Swiss women. Of the population in the municipality, 186 or about 48.2% were born in Fahy and lived there in 2000. There were 110 or 28.5% who were born in the same canton, while 23 or 6.0% were born somewhere else in Switzerland, and 55 or 14.2% were born outside of Switzerland.

As of 2000, children and teenagers (0–19 years old) make up 26.4% of the population, while adults (20–64 years old) make up 56.7% and seniors (over 64 years old) make up 16.8%.

As of 2000, there were 152 people who were single and never married in the municipality. There were 198 married individuals, 20 widows or widowers and 16 individuals who are divorced.

As of 2000, there were 149 private households in the municipality, and an average of 2.5 persons per household. There were 30 households that consist of only one person and 14 households with five or more people. In 2000, a total of 139 apartments (78.5% of the total) were permanently occupied, while 26 apartments (14.7%) were seasonally occupied and 12 apartments (6.8%) were empty. The vacancy rate for the municipality, in 2010, was 1.11%.

The historical population is given in the following chart:

== Heritage sites of national significance ==
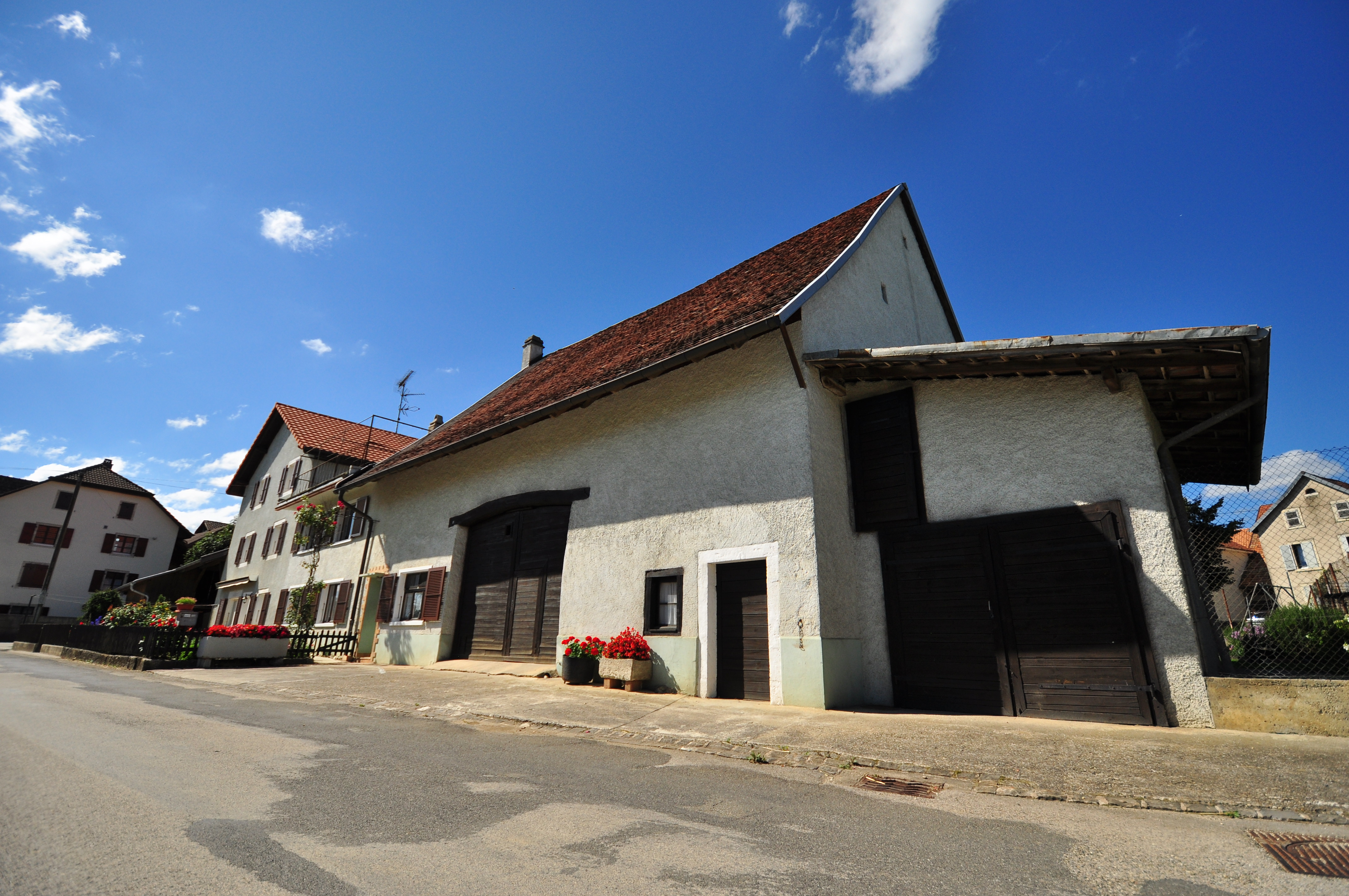
Farm House at Bout-Dessous 18

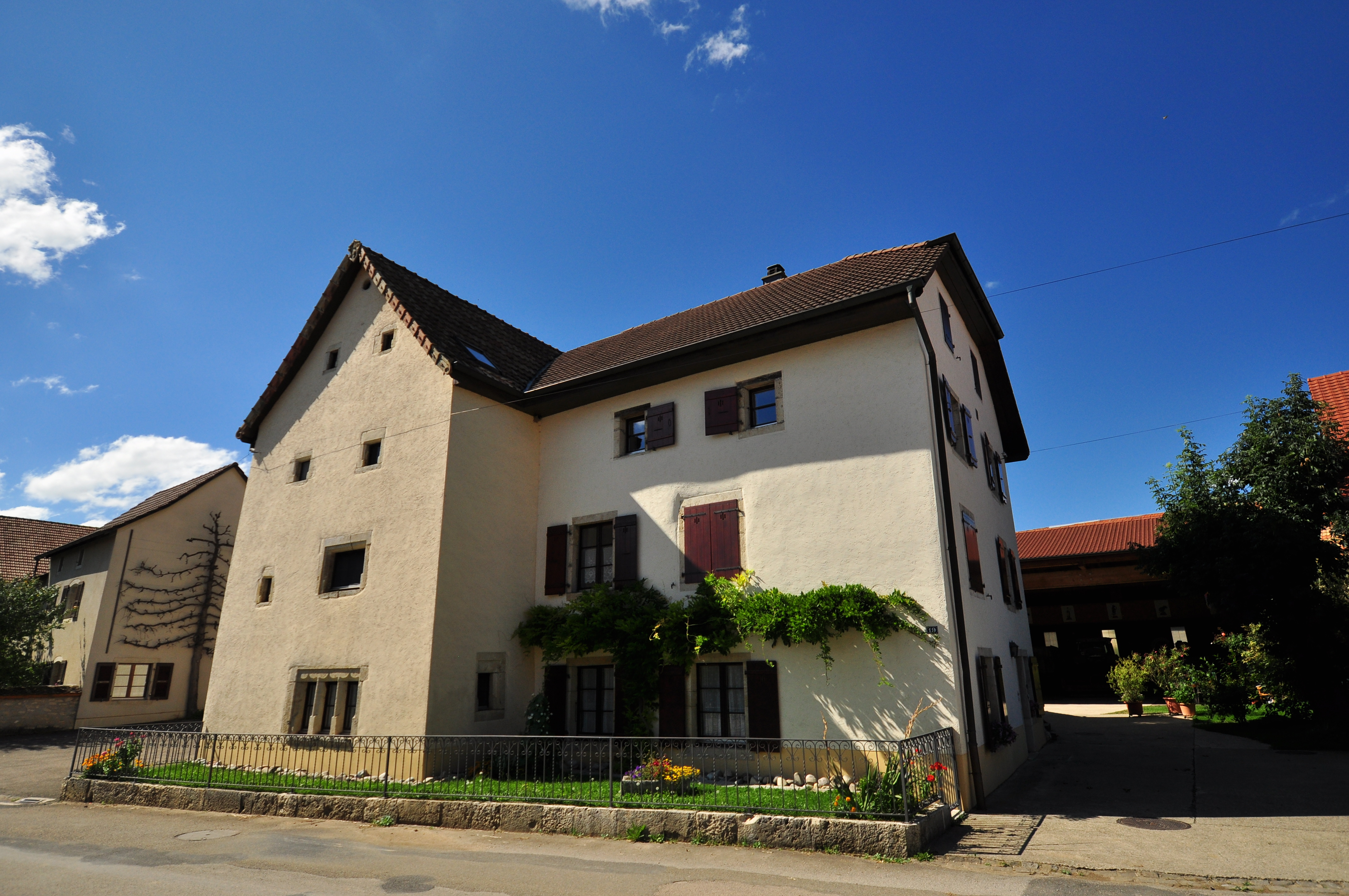
House at Bout-Dessous 19

The farm house at Bout-Dessous 18 and the house at Bout-Dessous 19 are listed as Swiss heritage site of national significance. The entire village of Fahy is part of the Inventory of Swiss Heritage Sites.

== Politics ==
In the 2007 federal election the most popular party was the CVP which received 33.67% of the vote. The next three most popular parties were the SPS (30.65%), the SVP (16.08%) and the FDP (14.07%). In the federal election, a total of 100 votes were cast, and the voter turnout was 35.0%.

== Economy ==
As of 2010, Fahy had an unemployment rate of 4.9%. As of 2008, there were 39 people employed in the primary economic sector and about 17 businesses involved in this sector. 64 people were employed in the secondary sector and there were 13 businesses in this sector. 89 people were employed in the tertiary sector, with 14 businesses in this sector. There were 192 residents of the municipality who were employed in some capacity, of which females made up 43.2% of the workforce.

In 2008 the total number of full-time equivalent jobs was 161. The number of jobs in the primary sector was 26, all of which were in agriculture. The number of jobs in the secondary sector was 61 of which 56 or (91.8%) were in manufacturing and 5 (8.2%) were in construction. The number of jobs in the tertiary sector was 74. In the tertiary sector; 22 or 29.7% were in wholesale or retail sales or the repair of motor vehicles, 14 or 18.9% were in the movement and storage of goods, 2 or 2.7% were in a hotel or restaurant, 5 or 6.8% were the insurance or financial industry, 25 or 33.8% were technical professionals or scientists, 3 or 4.1% were in education.

In 2000, there were 176 workers who commuted into the municipality and 88 workers who commuted away. The municipality is a net importer of workers, with about 2.0 workers entering the municipality for every one leaving. About 35.2% of the workforce coming into Fahy are coming from outside Switzerland. Of the working population, 5.7% used public transportation to get to work, and 54.7% used a private car.

== Religion ==
From the 2000 census, 313 or 81.1% were Roman Catholic, while 40 or 10.4% belonged to the Swiss Reformed Church. Of the rest of the population, there were 14 individuals (or about 3.63% of the population) who belonged to another Christian church. There were 2 (or about 0.52% of the population) who were Islamic. 15 (or about 3.89% of the population) belonged to no church, are agnostic or atheist, and 9 individuals (or about 2.33% of the population) did not answer the question.

== Education ==
In Fahy about 107 or (27.7%) of the population have completed non-mandatory upper secondary education, and 33 or (8.5%) have completed additional higher education (either university or a Fachhochschule). Of the 33 who completed tertiary schooling, 63.6% were Swiss men, 27.3% were Swiss women.

The Canton of Jura school system provides two-year of non-obligatory Kindergarten, followed by six years of Primary school. This is followed by three years of obligatory lower Secondary school where the students are separated according to ability and aptitude. Following the lower Secondary students may attend a three or four-year optional upper Secondary school followed by some form of Tertiary school or they may enter an apprenticeship.

During the 2009–10 school year, there were no students attending school in Fahy.

As of 2000, there were 14 students in Fahy who came from another municipality, while 48 residents attended schools outside the municipality.

== Climate ==
Climate data for Fahy, elevation 596 m (1,955 ft), (1991–2020)
Month	Jan	Feb	Mar	Apr	May	Jun	Jul	Aug	Sep	Oct	Nov	Dec	Year
Mean daily maximum °C (°F)	4.0 (39.2)	5.2 (41.4)	9.4 (48.9)	13.5 (56.3)	17.3 (63.1)	21.0 (69.8)	23.5 (74.3)	23.1 (73.6)	18.4 (65.1)	13.7 (56.7)	8.1 (46.6)	4.9 (40.8)	13.5 (56.3)
Daily mean °C (°F)	1.2 (34.2)	1.9 (35.4)	5.4 (41.7)	8.8 (47.8)	12.6 (54.7)	16.1 (61.0)	18.2 (64.8)	18.0 (64.4)	13.9 (57.0)	9.9 (49.8)	5.0 (41.0)	2.2 (36.0)	9.4 (48.9)
Mean daily minimum °C (°F)	−1.7 (28.9)	−1.3 (29.7)	1.4 (34.5)	4.2 (39.6)	8.0 (46.4)	11.4 (52.5)	13.3 (55.9)	13.3 (55.9)	9.9 (49.8)	6.4 (43.5)	2.0 (35.6)	−0.6 (30.9)	5.5 (41.9)
Average precipitation mm (inches)	66.6 (2.62)	63.9 (2.52)	68.6 (2.70)	78.1 (3.07)	106.8 (4.20)	98.7 (3.89)	92.9 (3.66)	103.3 (4.07)	88.4 (3.48)	98.8 (3.89)	90.3 (3.56)	90.0 (3.54)	1,046.4 (41.20)
Average snowfall cm (inches)	18.4 (7.2)	20.0 (7.9)	11.5 (4.5)	1.9 (0.7)	0.0 (0.0)	0.0 (0.0)	0.0 (0.0)	0.0 (0.0)	0.0 (0.0)	0.0 (0.0)	6.1 (2.4)	12.0 (4.7)	69.9 (27.5)
Average precipitation days (≥ 1.0 mm)	11.2	10.7	10.4	10.2	13.0	10.9	10.9	10.5	9.5	11.7	11.6	13.0	133.6
Average snowy days (≥ 1.0 cm)	4.4	4.8	2.6	0.4	0.0	0.0	0.0	0.0	0.0	0.0	1.3	3.3	16.8
Average relative humidity (%)	84	79	73	70	74	74	71	73	79	83	85	84	77
Mean monthly sunshine hours	64.7	87.2	135.9	169.7	185.3	210.8	233.5	221.5	162.1	115.7	67.4	55.5	1,709.3
Percentage possible sunshine	25	32	39	44	42	47	52	53	46	37	26	22	41
Source 1: NOAA
Source 2: MeteoSwiss (snow 1981–2010)
