= Montancy =

- Commune
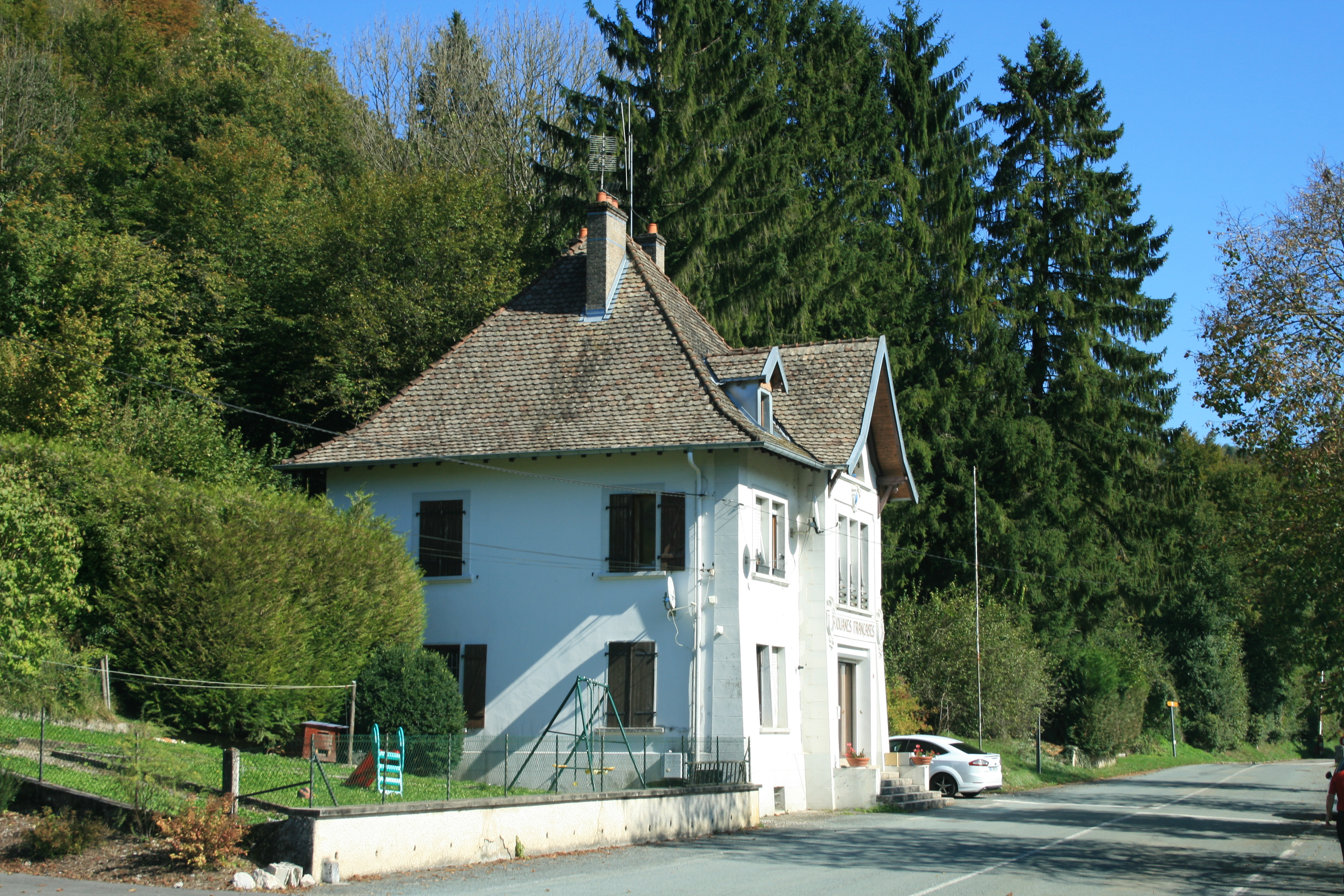
- Border crossing
- Location of Montancy
- Location within France Location within Bourgogne-Franche-Comté
- Coordinates: 47°20′50″N 7°02′52″E
- Country: France
- Region: Bourgogne-Franche-Comté
- Department: Doubs
- Arrondissement: Montbéliard
- Canton: Maîche

Government
  - Mayor (2023–2026): Nicolas Jubin
- Area^{1}: 8.86 km^{2} (3.42 sq mi)
- Highest elevation: 920 m (3,020 ft)
- Lowest elevation: 410 m (1,350 ft)
- Population (2023): 127
  - Density: 14.3/km^{2} (37.1/sq mi)
- Time zone: UTC+01:00 (CET)
  - Summer (DST): UTC+02:00 (CEST)
- INSEE/Postal code: 25386 /25190
- ^{1} French Land Register data, which excludes lakes, ponds, glaciers > 1 km^{2} (0.386 sq mi or 247 acres) and river estuaries.

Montancy (French pronunciation: [mɔ̃tɑ̃si]; unofficial also Montancy-Brémoncourt) is a commune in the Doubs department in the Bourgogne-Franche-Comté region in eastern France.

== Geography ==
The commune lies 23 km (14 mi) east of Saint-Hippolyte at the east end of the department near the Swiss border. The village of Brémoncourt lies in the valley of the Doubs at 430 m, and Montancy on the plateau at 900 m.

== Population ==
Historical population
Year	Pop.	±% p.a.
1968	146	—
1975	124	−2.31%
1982	122	−0.23%
1990	137	+1.46%
1999	152	+1.16%
2007	147	−0.42%
2012	158	+1.45%
2017	141	−2.25%
2023	127	−1.73%
Source: INSEE

== See also ==
- Communes of the Doubs department
