= Dannemarie, Doubs =

Dannemarie
- Commune
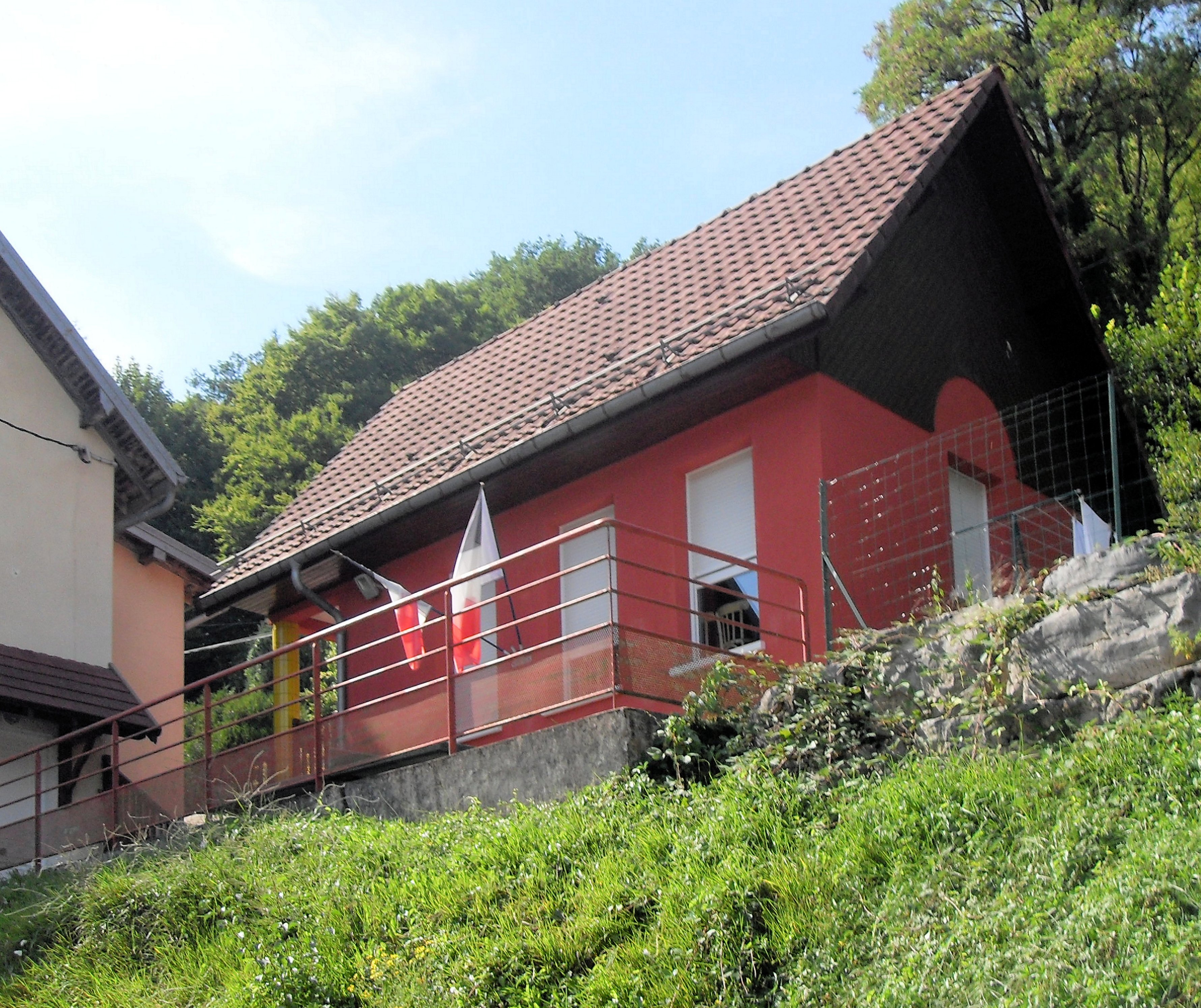
- The town hall in Dannemarie
- Location of Dannemarie
- Location within France Location within Bourgogne-Franche-Comté
- Coordinates: 47°23′28″N 6°53′52″E
- Country: France
- Region: Bourgogne-Franche-Comté
- Department: Doubs
- Arrondissement: Montbéliard
- Canton: Maîche
- Intercommunality: Pays de Montbéliard Agglomération

Government
  - Mayor (2020–2026): Philippe Gasser
- Area^{1}: 2.25 km^{2} (0.87 sq mi)
- Highest elevation: 671 m (2,201 ft)
- Lowest elevation: 430 m (1,410 ft)
- Population (2023): 116
  - Density: 51.6/km^{2} (134/sq mi)
- Time zone: UTC+01:00 (CET)
  - Summer (DST): UTC+02:00 (CEST)
- INSEE/Postal code: 25194 /25310
- ^{1} French Land Register data, which excludes lakes, ponds, glaciers > 1 km^{2} (0.386 sq mi or 247 acres) and river estuaries.

Dannemarie (French pronunciation: [danmaʁi]; unofficial also Dannemarie-lès-Glay) is a commune in the Doubs department in the Bourgogne-Franche-Comté region in eastern France.

== Population ==
Historical population
Year	Pop.	±% p.a.
1968	78	—
1975	86	+1.40%
1982	99	+2.03%
1990	129	+3.36%
1999	102	−2.58%
2007	101	−0.12%
2012	110	+1.72%
2017	113	+0.54%
2023	116	+0.44%
Source: INSEE

== See also ==
- Communes of the Doubs department
