= Vaufrey =

- Commune
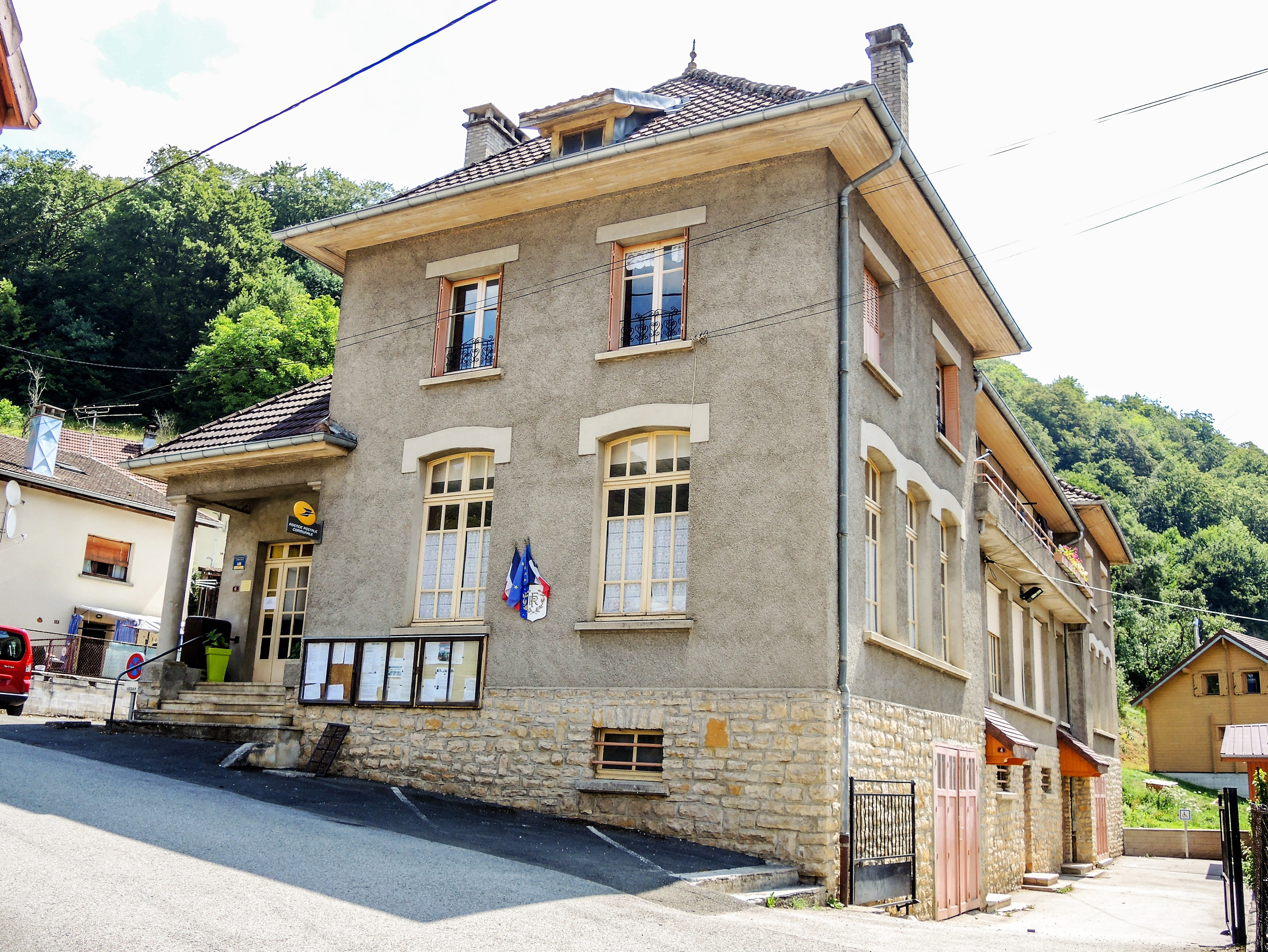
- The town hall and school in Vaufrey
- Location of Vaufrey
- Location within France Location within Bourgogne-Franche-Comté
- Coordinates: 47°20′55″N 6°55′30″E
- Country: France
- Region: Bourgogne-Franche-Comté
- Department: Doubs
- Arrondissement: Montbéliard
- Canton: Maîche

Government
  - Mayor (2020–2026): Francine Miseré
- Area^{1}: 9.37 km^{2} (3.62 sq mi)
- Highest elevation: 900 m (3,000 ft)
- Lowest elevation: 395 m (1,296 ft)
- Population (2023): 147
  - Density: 15.7/km^{2} (40.6/sq mi)
- Time zone: UTC+01:00 (CET)
  - Summer (DST): UTC+02:00 (CEST)
- INSEE/Postal code: 25591 /25190
- ^{1} French Land Register data, which excludes lakes, ponds, glaciers > 1 km^{2} (0.386 sq mi or 247 acres) and river estuaries.

Vaufrey (French pronunciation: [vofʁɛ]) is a commune in the Doubs department in the Bourgogne-Franche-Comté region in eastern France.

== Population ==
Historical population
Year	Pop.	±% p.a.
1968	235	—
1975	157	−5.60%
1982	156	−0.09%
1990	157	+0.08%
1999	162	+0.35%
2007	145	−1.38%
2012	157	+1.60%
2017	158	+0.13%
2023	147	−1.20%
Source: INSEE

== See also ==
- Communes of the Doubs department
