= Porrentruy District =

Coordinates: 47°25′N 7°04′E

Porrentruy District District de Porrentruy Bezirk Pruntrut
- District
- Flag Coat of arms
- Country: Switzerland
- Canton: Jura
- Capital: Porrentruy

Area
  - Total: 335.14 km^{2} (129.40 sq mi)

Population (2020)
  - Total: 24,276
  - Density: 72.435/km^{2} (187.61/sq mi)
- Time zone: UTC+1 (CET)
  - Summer (DST): UTC+2 (CEST)
- Municipalities: 19

Porrentruy District (German: Bezirk Pruntrut, French: District de Porrentruy) is one of the four districts of the canton of Jura, Switzerland. Its capital is the town of Porrentruy. The French-speaking district has a population of 24,276 (as of 31 December 2020).

== Municipalities ==
Porrentruy is divided into a total of 19 municipalities:

| Coat of Arms | Municipality | Population (31 December 2020) | Area km^{2} |
|---|---|---|---|
| | Alle | 1,895 | 10.6 |
| | Basse-Allaine | 1,241 | 23.04 |
| | Basse-Vendline | 782 | 18.67 |
| | Boncourt | 1,195 | 9.02 |
| | Bure | 645 | 13.68 |
| | Clos du Doubs | 1,263 | 61.75 |
| | Coeuve | 740 | 11.62 |
| | Cornol | 1,028 | 10.45 |
| | Courchavon | 314 | 6.19 |
| | Courgenay | 2,400 | 18.44 |
| | Courtedoux | 755 | 8.21 |
| | Damphreux-Lugnez | 369 | 10.77 |
| | Fahy | 347 | 7.78 |
| | Fontenais | 1,690 | 19.99 |
| | Grandfontaine | 387 | 8.97 |
| | Haute-Ajoie | 6,557 | 36.47 |
| | La Baroche | 1,135 | 31.07 |
| | Porrentruy | 6,434 | 14.76 |
| | Vendlincourt | 560 | 9.15 |
| | Total (19) | 24,276 | 335.14 |

== Coat of arms ==
The blazon of the district coat of arms is Gules a Fess Argent, overall a Cockatrice Or volant holding in legs and beak a Crosier of the same.

== Demographics ==
Porrentruy has a population (as of December 2020) of 24,276. Most of the population (as of 2000) speaks French (22,008 or 91.8%) as their first language, German is the second most common (1,001 or 4.2%) and Italian is the third (306 or 1.3%). There are 8 people who speak Romansh.

As of 2008, the population was 48.8% male and 51.2% female. The population was made up of 10,585 Swiss men (43.7% of the population) and 1,243 (5.1%) non-Swiss men. There were 11,322 Swiss women (46.7%) and 1,083 (4.5%) non-Swiss women. Of the population in the district, 9,552 or about 39.8% were born in Porrentruy and lived there in 2000. There were 7,448 or 31.1% who were born in the same canton, while 2,708 or 11.3% were born somewhere else in Switzerland, and 3,388 or 14.1% were born outside of Switzerland.

As of 2000, there were 9,390 people who were single and never married in the district. There were 11,599 married individuals, 1,854 widows or widowers and 1,128 individuals who are divorced.

There were 3,245 households that consist of only one person and 747 households with five or more people.

The historical population is given in the following chart:

== Mergers and name changes ==
- On 1 January 2009, seventeen municipalities merged into four new municipalities
  - The former municipalities of Montenol, Montmelon, Ocourt, Saint-Ursanne and Seleute merged to form the new municipality of Clos du Doubs. ** The former municipalities of Asuel, Charmoille, Fregiécourt, Miécourt and Pleujouse merged to form the new municipality of La Baroche.
  - The former municipalities of Buix, Courtemaîche and Montignez merged to form the new municipality of Basse-Allaine.
  - The former municipalities of Chevenez, Damvant, Réclère and Roche-d'Or merged to form the new municipality of Haute-Ajoie.
- On 1 January 2013 the former municipality of Bressaucourt merged into the municipality of Fontenais.
- On 1 January 2018 the former municipality of Corban merged into the municipality of Haute-Ajoie.
- On 1 January 2023 the former municipalities of Damphreux and Lugnez merged into the new municipality of Damphreux-Lugnez.
- On 1 January 2024 the former municipalities of Beurnevésin and Bonfol merged into the new municipality of Basse-Vendline.

== Politics ==
In the 2007 federal election the most popular party was the CVP which received 33.81% of the vote. The next three most popular parties were the SPS (31.98%), the FDP (16.2%) and the SVP (12.88%). In the federal election, a total of 8,374 votes were cast, and the voter turnout was 46.7%.

== Religion ==
From the 2000 census, 18,473 or 77.1% were Roman Catholic, while 2,423 or 10.1% belonged to the Swiss Reformed Church. Of the rest of the population, there were 79 members of an Orthodox church (or about 0.33% of the population), there were 15 individuals (or about 0.06% of the population) who belonged to the Christian Catholic Church, and there were 733 individuals (or about 3.06% of the population) who belonged to another Christian church. There were 8 individuals (or about 0.03% of the population) who were Jewish, and 287 (or about 1.20% of the population) who were Islamic. There were 30 individuals who were Buddhist, 8 individuals who were Hindu and 21 individuals who belonged to another church. 1,322 (or about 5.51% of the population) belonged to no church, are agnostic or atheist, and 933 individuals (or about 3.89% of the population) did not answer the question.

== Education ==
In Porrentruy about 7,375 or (30.8%) of the population have completed non-mandatory upper secondary education, and 1,985 or (8.3%) have completed additional higher education (either university or a Fachhochschule). Of the 1,985 who completed tertiary schooling, 62.7% were Swiss men, 25.5% were Swiss women, 7.2% were non-Swiss men and 4.6% were non-Swiss women.

The Canton of Jura school system provides two year of non-obligatory Kindergarten, followed by six years of Primary school. This is followed by three years of obligatory lower Secondary school where the students are separated according to ability and aptitude. Following the lower Secondary students may attend a three or four year optional upper Secondary school followed by some form of Tertiary school or they may enter an apprenticeship.

During the 2009-10 school year, there were a total of 1,955 students attending 117 classes in Porrentruy. There were 24 kindergarten classes with a total of 416 students in the district. The district had 92.5 primary classes and 1,539 students.
