= Canton of Jura =

Canton of Switzerland

Jura
- Canton
- Republic and Canton of Jura; République et Canton du Jura (French)
- Flag Coat of arms Brandmark
- Anthem: La Nouvelle Rauracienne
- Interactive map of Jura
- Coordinates: 47°22′N 7°9′E
- Country: Switzerland
- Capital: Delémont
- Subdivisions: 51 municipalities, 4 districts

Government
  - President: Rosalie Beuret Siess
  - Executive: Government (5)
  - Legislative: Parliament (60)

Area
  - Total: 858.04 km^{2} (331.29 sq mi)

Population (December 2020)
  - Total: 73,709
  - Density: 85.904/km^{2} (222.49/sq mi)

GDP
  - Total: CHF 4.687 billion (2020)
  - Per capita: CHF 63,643 (2020)
- ISO 3166 code: CH-JU
- Highest point: 1,302 m (4,272 ft): Mont Raimeux
- Lowest point: 364 m (1,194 ft): Allaine at Boncourt
- Joined: 1979
- Languages: French
- Website: www.ju.ch

The Republic and Canton of Jura (officially in French: République et Canton du Jura), less formally the Canton of Jura or Canton Jura (/ˈ(d)ʒʊərə/ JOOR-ə, ZHOOR-ə; French: [ʒyʁa]), is the newest (founded in 1979) of the 26 Swiss cantons, located in the northwestern part of Switzerland. The capital is Delémont. It shares borders with the canton of Basel-Landschaft, the canton of Bern, the canton of Neuchâtel, the canton of Solothurn, and the French regions of Bourgogne-Franche-Comté and Grand Est.

== History ==
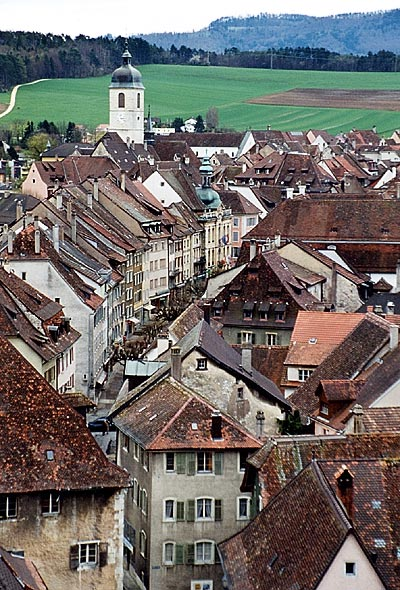
Old city of Porrentruy

The king of Burgundy donated much of the land that today makes up canton Jura to the bishop of Basel in 999. The area was a sovereign state within the Holy Roman Empire for more than 800 years. After the Treaty of Westphalia in 1648, the Jura had close ties with the Swiss Confederation. At the Congress of Vienna (1815), the Jura region became part of the canton of Bern. This act caused dissension. The Jura was French-speaking and Roman Catholic, whereas the canton of Bern was mostly German-speaking and Protestant.

After World War II, a separatist movement campaigned for a secession of Jura from the canton of Bern. After a long and partly militant struggle, which included some arson attacks by a youth organisation Les Béliers, a constitution was accepted in 1977. In 1978, the split was made official when the Swiss people voted in favour, and in 1979, Jura joined the Swiss Confederation as a full member. The canton celebrated its independence from the canton of Bern on 23 June 1979. However, the southern part of the region, which is also predominantly French-speaking but has a Protestant majority, opted not to join the newly formed canton, instead remaining part of the canton of Bern. The area is now known as Bernese Jura. The word Jura, therefore, may refer either to canton Jura, or to the combined territory of canton Jura and the Bernese Jura. Switzerland as a whole often presents the latter from a touristic standpoint with documentation easily available in French or German.

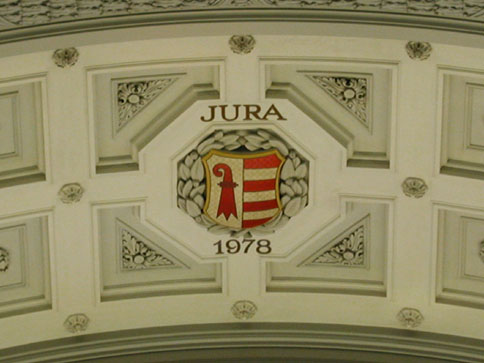
The coat of arms of the canton has been added to the side of the dome in the Federal Palace in Bern, which features the arms of the other cantons, after its foundation in 1978

On creation, the canton adopted the title Republic and Canton of Jura. Other cantons in Switzerland using the title "Republic and Canton" are Ticino, Geneva, and Neuchâtel. In each case, the title refers to the autonomy of the canton and its nominal sovereignty within the Swiss Confederation.

Since 1994, the question of the Jura region has again been controversial. In 2004, a federal commission proposed that the French-speaking southern Jura be united with the canton of Jura, as the language question now seems to be more important than the denominational one. A possible solution would be to create two half-cantons, as reunification with the creation of only a single canton would mean a complete restructuring of Jura's current political system, with the cantonal capital being transferred from Delémont to Moutier.

On 18 June 2017, the town of Moutier voted to secede from the canton of Bern and join the canton of Jura in a referendum. On 17 September 2017, the nearby municipalities of Belprahon and Sorvilier conversely voted to remain in the canton of Bern. The vote in Moutier was later declared invalid. On 28 March 2021, Moutier again voted to secede from Bern and join Jura in an officially sanctioned referendum. As of the first of January 2026, Moutier is now an official part of the canton of Jura.

== Geography ==
Canton Jura lies in the northwest of Switzerland. It consists of parts of the Jura mountains in the south and the Jura plateau in the north. The Jura plateau is hilly and almost entirely limestone. The districts of Ajoie and Franches-Montagnes lie in this region. The term "Jurassic" is derived from the Jura Alps, strata of which give the era its name.

To the north and the west of the canton lies France. The canton of Solothurn and Basel-Landschaft are to east of the canton, while the canton of Bern bounds the Jura to the south. The rivers Doubs and the Birs drain the lands. The Doubs joins the Saône and then the Rhône, whereas the Birs is a tributary to the Rhine.

== Political subdivisions ==
=== Districts ===
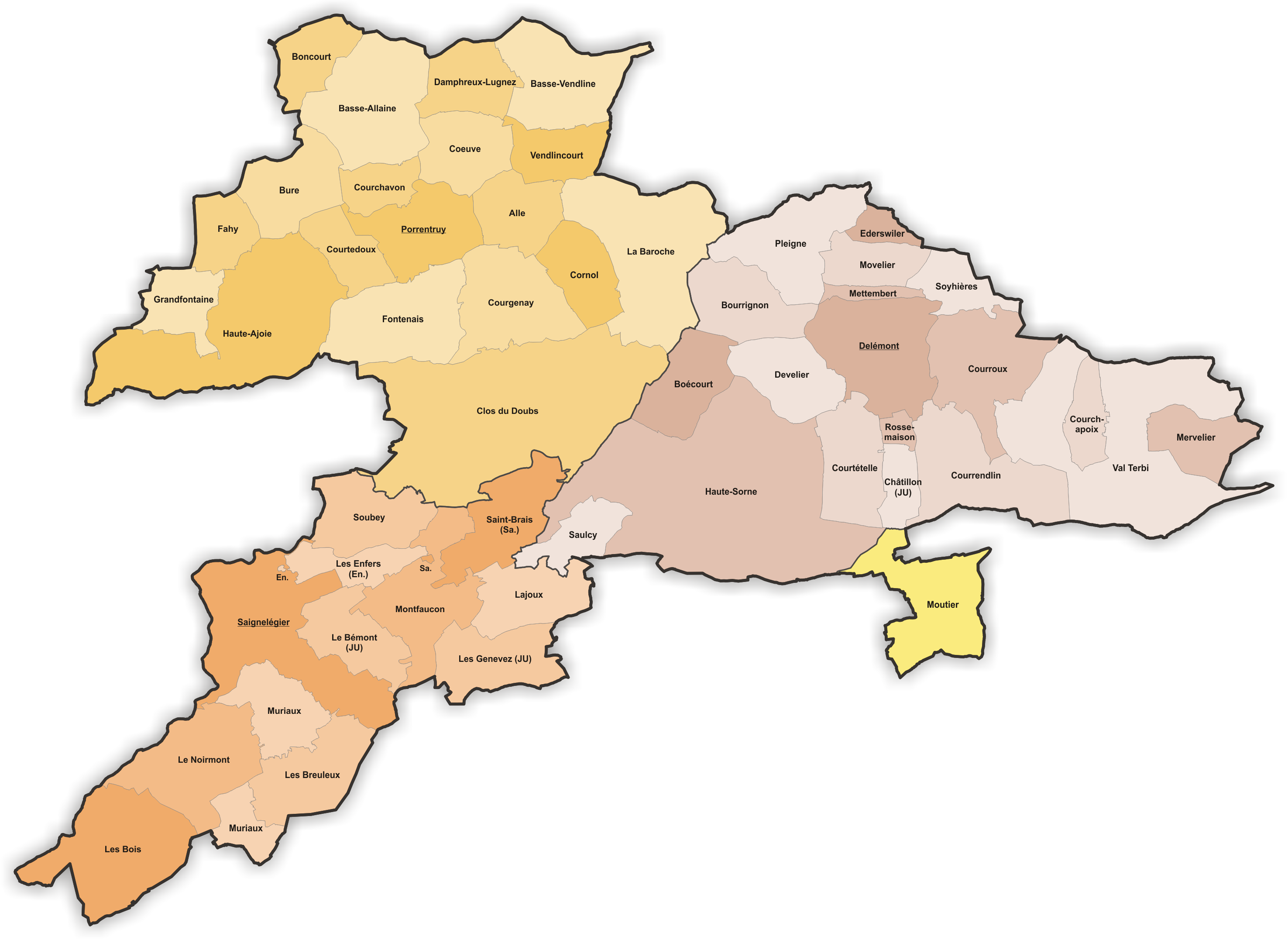
Districts and municipalities in the canton of Jura

Jura is divided into 4 districts:

- Delémont (Franc-Comtois: D'lémont, German: Delsberg) - capital: Delémont
- Porrentruy (Franc-Comtois: Poérreintru, German: Pruntrut) - capital: Porrentruy
- Franches-Montagnes (Franc-Comtois: Fraintches-Montaignes, German: Freiberge) - capital: Saignelégier
- Moutier District - capital: Moutier

=== Municipalities ===
There are 51 municipalities in the canton (As of 2026).

== Politics ==
=== Federal election results ===
Percentage of the total vote per party in the canton in the National Council Elections 1971-2019
Party	Ideology	1971	1975	1979	1983	1987	1991	1995	1999	2003	2007	2011	2015	2019
LRP.The Liberal-Radicals (Note: RDP before 2010)	Classical liberalism	(Note: Part of the canton of Bern)		30.9	28.8	33.4	35.1	29.5	19.5	16.3	13.4	9.5	16.8	9.1
CVP/PDC/PPD/PCD	Christian democracy			37.7	25.1	33.0	36.0	38.2	39.2	39.5	25.0	33.2	27.6	22.8
SP/PS	Social democracy			* (Note: "*" indicates that the party was not on the ballot in this canton.)	17.8	25.5	28.8	32.4	34.2	34.2	36.9	30.8	23.7	27.0
SVP/UDC	Swiss nationalism			*	2.0	*	*	*	7.2	8.3	13.7	15.5	12.8	14.5
CSP/PCS	Christian socialism			*	11.8	8.1	*	*	*	*	11.0	*	6.6	9.6
PdA/PST-POP/PC/PSL	Socialism			*	*	*	*	*	*	*	*	*	3.8	*
GPS/PES	Green politics			*	*	*	*	*	*	*	*	11.0	7.3	15.6
EDU/UDF	Christian right			*	*	*	*	*	*	1.8	*	*	*	*
Other				31.4	14.5	*	*	*	*	*	*	*	1.4	1.4
Voter participation %				58.6	61.4	51.6	43.4	42.4	40.9	46.6	44.0	44.4	54.3	42.6

== Demographics ==
The population is almost entirely French-speaking. Just one municipality is German-speaking: Ederswiler. The majority of the population is Roman Catholic (75% as of 2000) with a small Protestant minority (13%). The population of the canton (as of 31 December 2020) was 73,709. As of 2007, the population included 8,195 foreigners, or about 11.8% of the total population.

== Historic population ==
The historical population is given in the following chart:

Historic Population Data
Year	Total Population	French-speaking	German-speaking	Protestant	Catholic	Other	Jewish	Muslim	No religion given	Swiss	Non-Swiss
1850	44,921			1,010	43,810		101			42,217	2,704
1880	52,116	46,257	5,898	3,708	48,095	14	235			47,873	4,503
1900	57,575	49,098	7,272	7,063	50,289	15	195			51,784	5,791
1950	59,554	50,517	8,105	10,453	48,578	49	82			56,804	2,750
1970	67,325	55,285	5,723	10,284	56,476	1,787	62			59,000	8,325
2000	68,224	61,376	3,001	8,513	51,092	2,610	22	1,310	4,250	59,500	8,724

== Economy ==
Agriculture is important in canton Jura. Cattle breeding is significant, but there is also horse breeding (the Franches-Montagnes is the last Swiss horse race). The main industries are watches, textiles and tobacco. There is a growing number of small and medium-sized businesses. In 2001, there were 3,578 people who worked in the primary economic sector. 14,109 people were employed in the secondary sector and 16,513 people were employed in the tertiary sector.

In 2001, the canton produced 0.9% of the entire Swiss national income while it had 0.9% of the total population. In 2005, the average share of the national income per resident of the canton was 38,070 CHF, while the national average was 54,031 CHF, or about 70% of the national income per person. Between 2003 and 2005, the average income grew at a rate of 6.4%, which was larger than the national rate of 5.3%. The average taxes in the canton are higher than in most cantons, in 2006, the tax index in the canton was 126.6 (Swiss average is 100.0). In 2006, the canton had the highest final tax rate on high wage earners (15.26% on a married couple with two children earning 150,000 CHF vs 11.6% nationally), though the tax rate was in the middle for lower-income families.

== Transport ==
The canton does not have its own airport. The nearest airport is EuroAirport Basel Mulhouse Freiburg, which is located 59 km (37 mi) north east of Delémont.

== Culture ==
The eau de vie Damassine is one typical produce of the Ajoie area. (see Terroir Jura and Jura Infos)

== See also ==
- Frainc-Comtou dialect
- History of Switzerland since 1914

== Bibliography ==
- Ganguillet, Gilbert: Le conflit jurassien. Un cas de mobilisation ethno-régionale en Suisse, Zürich 1986.
- Harder, Hans-Joachim: Der Kanton Jura. Ursachen und Schritte zur Lösung eines Schweizer Minderheitenproblems, Frankfurt am Main 1978.
- Hauser, Claude: Aux origines intellectuelles de la Question jurassienne. Culture et politique entre la France et la Suisse romande (1910–1950), Diss. Fribourg 1997.
- Henecka, Hans Peter: Die jurassischen Separatisten. Eine Studie zur Soziologie des ethnischen Konflikts und der sozialen Bewegung, Meisenheim am Glan 1972.
- Jenkins, John R.G.: Jura Separatism in Switzerland, Oxford 1986.
- Ruch, Christian: Struktur und Strukturwandel des jurassischen Separatismus zwischen 1974 und 1994, Bern 2001.
- Schwander, Marcel: Jura. Konfliktstoff für Jahrzehnte, Zürich/Köln 1977.
- Steppacher, Burkard: Die Jurafrage in der Schweiz, München 1985.
