= Boncourt, Switzerland =

Boncourt
- Municipality
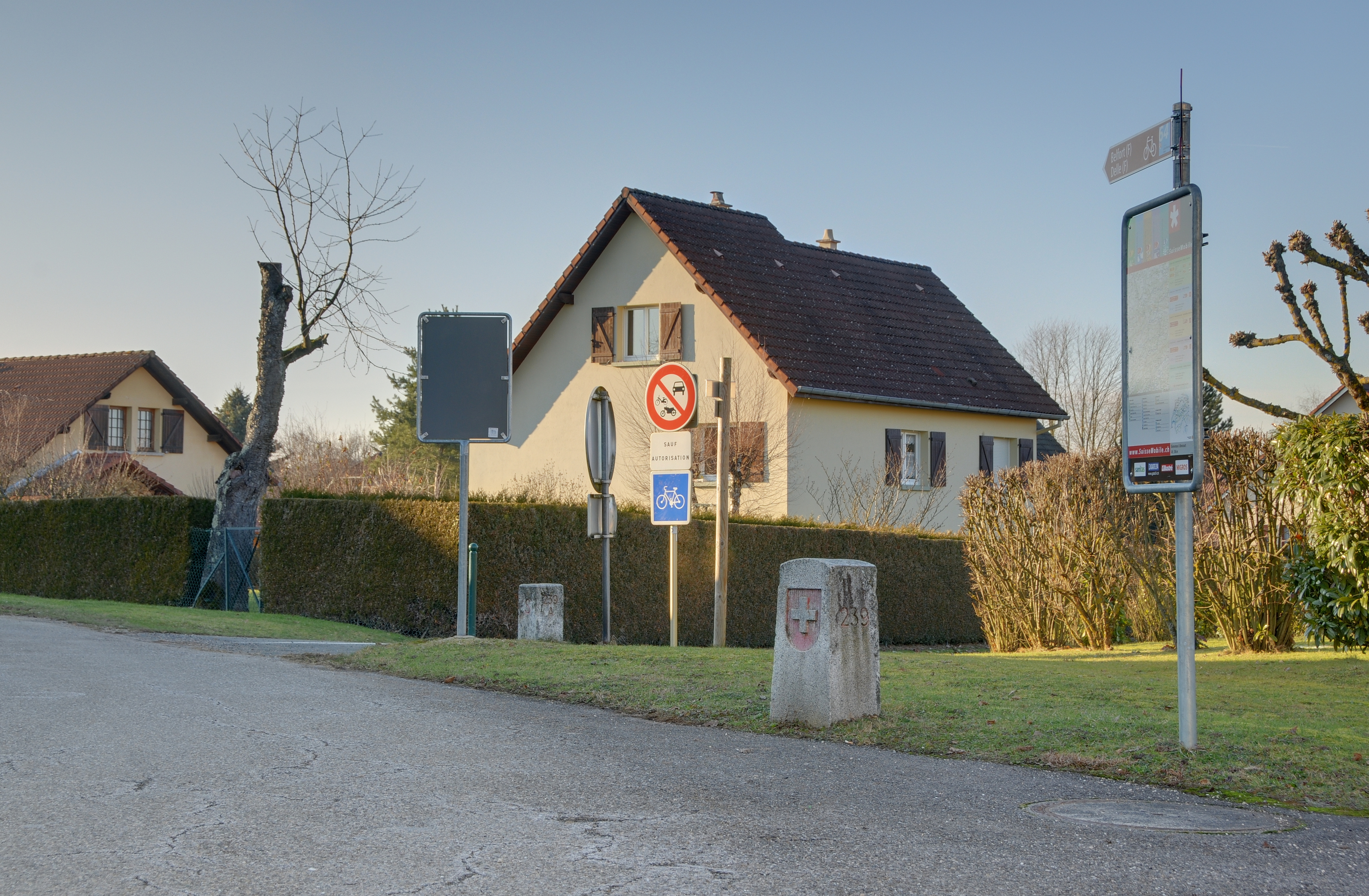
- French/Swiss border at Boncourt village

- Coat of arms
- Location of Boncourt
- Location within Switzerland Location within Canton of Jura
- Coordinates: 47°30′N 07°01′E
- Country: Switzerland
- Canton: Jura
- District: Porrentruy

Government
  - Executive: Conseil communal with 7 members
  - Mayor: Maire; Lionel Maitre (as of 2026)

Area
  - Total: 9.02 km^{2} (3.48 sq mi)
- Elevation: 373 m (1,224 ft)

Population (2003)
  - Total: 1,333
  - Density: 148/km^{2} (383/sq mi)
- Time zone: UTC+01:00 (CET)
  - Summer (DST): UTC+02:00 (CEST)
- Postal code: 2926
- SFOS number: 6774
- ISO 3166 code: CH-JU
- Surrounded by: Buix, Villars-le-Sec (F), Saint-Dizier-l'Évêque (F), Lebetain (F), Delle (F), Florimont (F), Courcelles (F)
- Website: www.boncourt.ch

Boncourt (French pronunciation: [bɔ̃kuʁ]; Frainc-Comtou: Boncouét) is a municipality in the district of Porrentruy in the canton of Jura in Switzerland.

== History ==
Boncourt is first mentioned in 1140 as Bononis Curia. The municipality was formerly known by its German name Bubendorf, however, that name is no longer used. During the Second World War Boncourt was a vital staging post for French speaking Switzerland, and the resistance.

== Geography ==
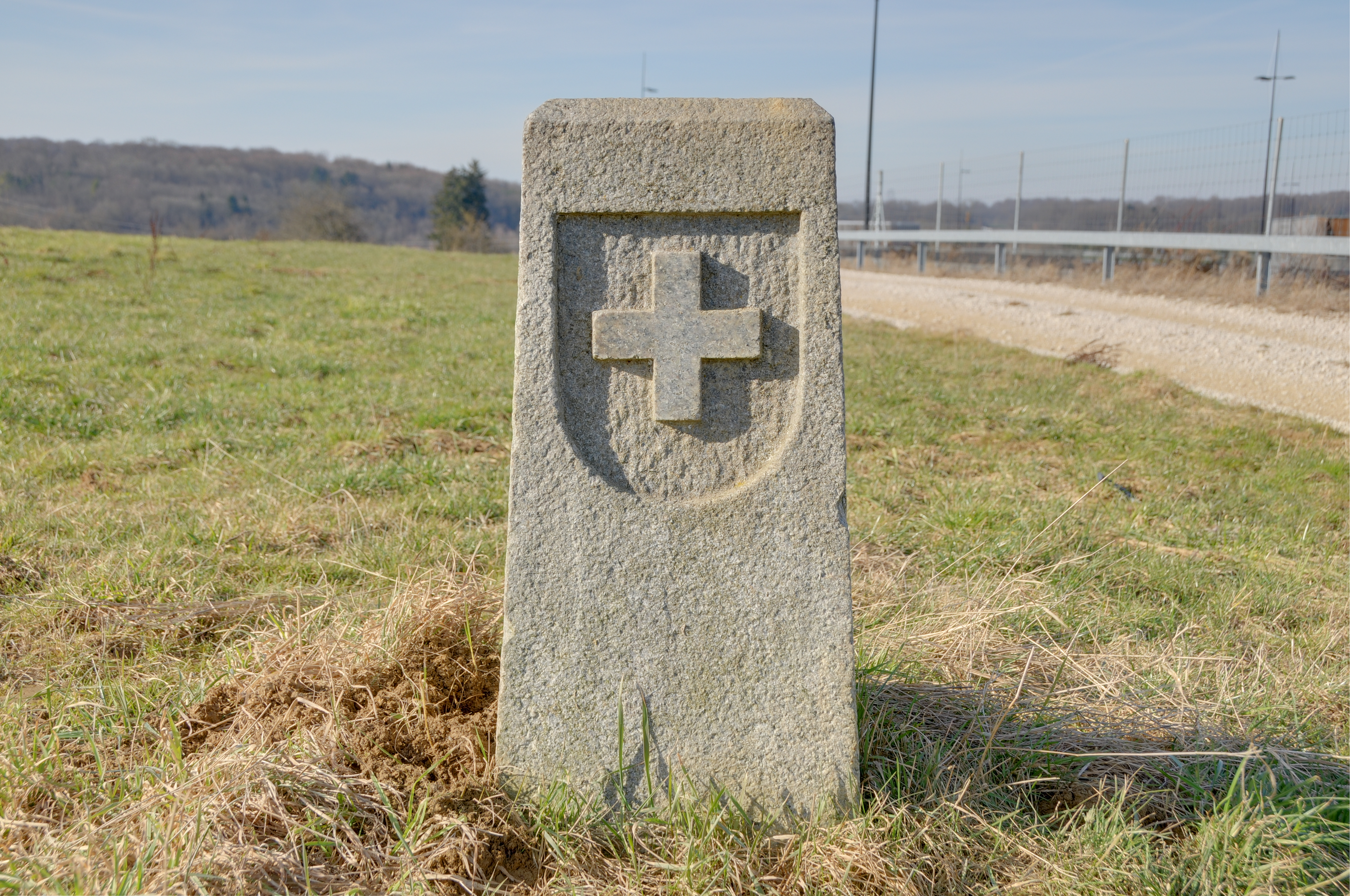
French-Swiss border marker at Boncourt

Aerial view (1950)

Boncourt has an area of 9.02 km^{2} (3.48 sq mi). Of this area, 3.74 km^{2} (1.44 mi^{2}) or 41.5% is used for agricultural purposes, while 3.42 km^{2} (1.32 mi^{2}) or 38.0% is forested. Of the rest of the land, 1.81 km^{2} (0.70 mi^{2}) or 20.1% is settled (buildings or roads), 0.05 km^{2} (12 acres) or 0.6% is either rivers or lakes.

Of the built up area, housing and buildings made up 9.3% and transportation infrastructure made up 3.7%. Power and water infrastructure as well as other special developed areas made up 5.1% of the area Out of the forested land, 36.7% of the total land area is heavily forested and 1.2% is covered with orchards or small clusters of trees. Of the agricultural land, 20.8% is used for growing crops and 15.8% is pastures, while 2.2% is used for orchards or vine crops and 2.8% is used for alpine pastures. All the water in the municipality is flowing water.

The municipality is located in the Porrentruy district, on the border with France. The large industrial village is the most important border crossing between the Canton of Jura and France.

== Coat of arms ==
The blazon of the municipal coat of arms is Gules, a Fleur de lis Or in base between two Halberds Argent in saltire.

== Demographics ==
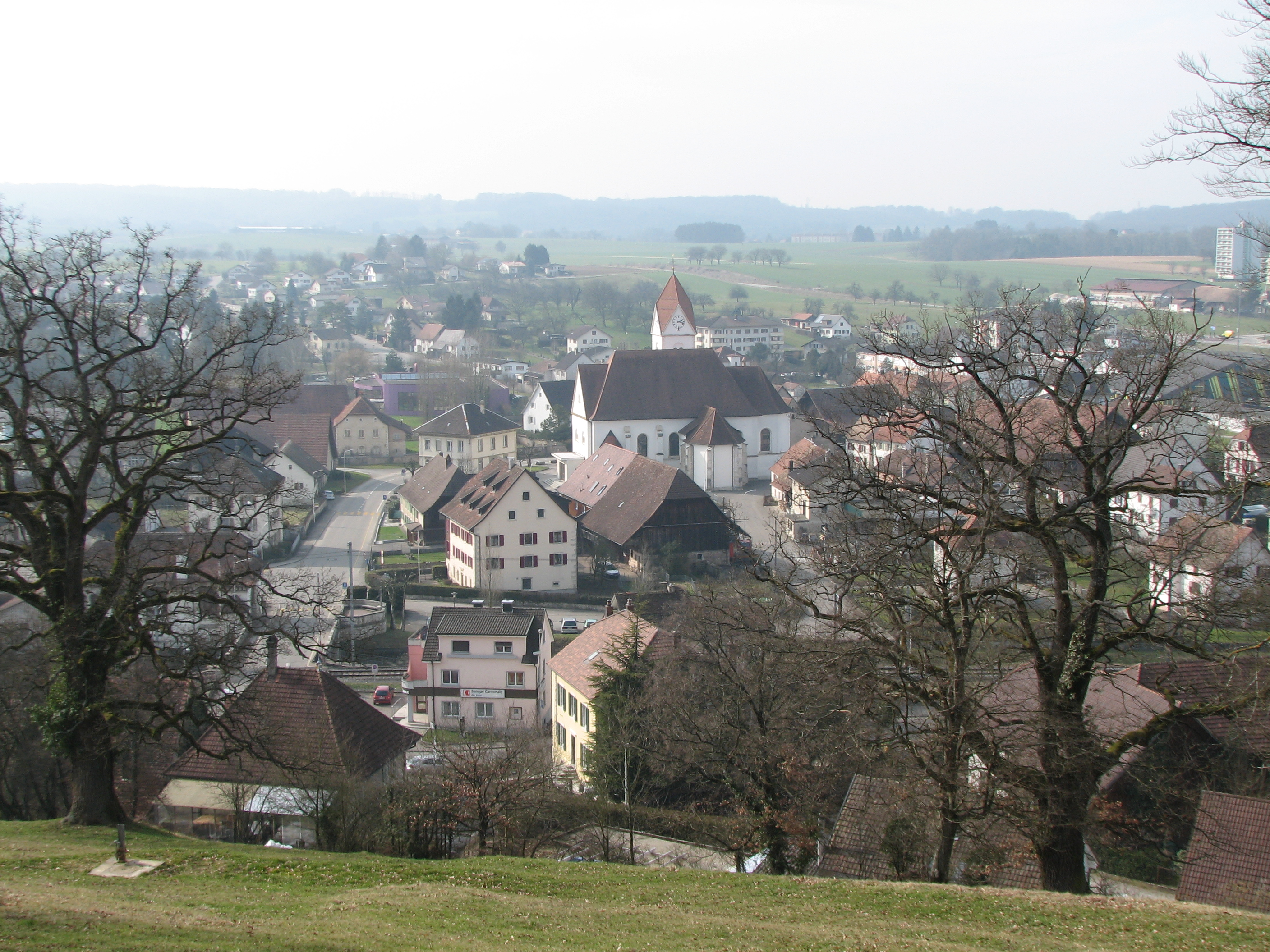
Boncourt town

Boncourt has a population (as of December 2020) of 1,195. As of 2008, 6.5% of the population are resident foreign nationals. Over the last 10 years (2000–2010) the population has changed at a rate of -2.6%. Migration accounted for 2%, while births and deaths accounted for -4.3%.

Most of the population (as of 2000) speaks French (1,312 or 96.6%) as their first language, German is the second most common (29 or 2.1%) and Italian is the third (6 or 0.4%). There is 1 person who speaks Romansh.

As of 2008, the population was 47.6% male and 52.4% female. The population was made up of 573 Swiss men (44.1% of the population) and 45 (3.5%) non-Swiss men. There were 639 Swiss women (49.2%) and 41 (3.2%) non-Swiss women. Of the population in the municipality, 530 or about 39.0% were born in Boncourt and lived there in 2000. There were 468 or 34.5% who were born in the same canton, while 134 or 9.9% were born somewhere else in Switzerland, and 164 or 12.1% were born outside of Switzerland.

As of 2000, children and teenagers (0–19 years old) make up 19.5% of the population, while adults (20–64 years old) make up 55.8% and seniors (over 64 years old) make up 24.7%.

As of 2000, there were 475 people who were single and never married in the municipality. There were 685 married individuals, 145 widows or widowers and 53 individuals who are divorced.

As of 2000, there were 560 private households in the municipality, and an average of 2.3 persons per household. There were 179 households that consist of only one person and 29 households with five or more people. In 2000, a total of 549 apartments (90.9% of the total) were permanently occupied, while 27 apartments (4.5%) were seasonally occupied and 28 apartments (4.6%) were empty. As of 2009, the construction rate of new housing units was 1.5 new units per 1000 residents. The vacancy rate for the municipality, in 2010, was 3.63%.

The historical population is given in the following chart:

== Heritage sites of national significance ==
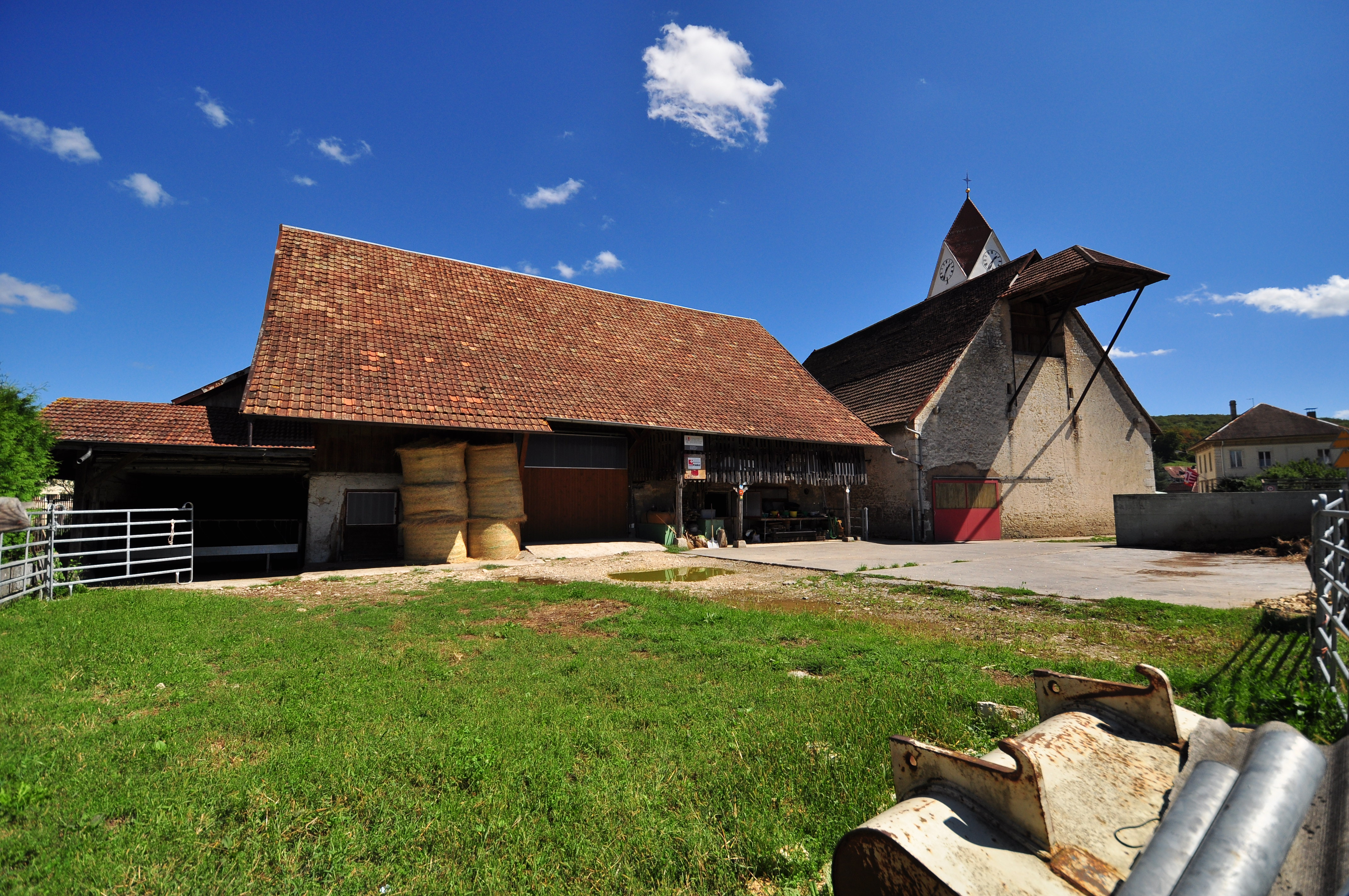
Chavon-Dessous Farm House

The Chavon-Dessous Farm House is listed as a Swiss heritage site of national significance.

=== Sights ===
Major attractions for visitors to Boncourt are the public swimming pool, the international railway, the Church, the schools, the shopping arcade and the famous Mont Renaud where a funicular railway is to be built.

== Twin Town ==
Boncourt is twinned with the town of Quincieux, France.

== Politics ==
In the 2007 federal election the most popular party was the CVP which received 48.54% of the vote. The next three most popular parties were the SPS (24.1%), the CSP (12.69%) and the SVP (8.27%). In the federal election, a total of 435 votes were cast, and the voter turnout was 41.3%.

== Economy ==
Boncourt is on the frontier of the Jura in Switzerland and the railway has been a major employer for over 150 years. British American Tobacco is another major employer in Boncourt. They have a restaurant which is open to the public. The long-standing family business F.J. Burrus was incorporated into BAT. Upon selling his business, Charles Burrus founded Fondation Guilé, a non-profit foundation promoting corporate responsibility.

As of 2010, Boncourt had an unemployment rate of 3.6%. As of 2008, there were 61 people employed in the primary economic sector and about 13 businesses involved in this sector. 937 people were employed in the secondary sector and there were 19 businesses in this sector. 415 people were employed in the tertiary sector, with 66 businesses in this sector. There were 596 residents of the municipality who were employed in some capacity, of which females made up 41.4% of the workforce.

In 2008 the total number of full-time equivalent jobs was 1,105. The number of jobs in the primary sector was 32, of which 29 were in agriculture and 3 were in forestry or lumber production. The number of jobs in the secondary sector was 747 of which 652 or (87.3%) were in manufacturing and 95 (12.7%) were in construction. The number of jobs in the tertiary sector was 326. In the tertiary sector; 36 or 11.0% were in wholesale or retail sales or the repair of motor vehicles, 20 or 6.1% were in the movement and storage of goods, 11 or 3.4% were in a hotel or restaurant, 1 was in the information industry, 16 or 4.9% were the insurance or financial industry, 24 or 7.4% were technical professionals or scientists, 9 or 2.8% were in education and 117 or 35.9% were in health care.

In 2000, there were 554 workers who commuted into the municipality and 198 workers who commuted away. The municipality is a net importer of workers, with about 2.8 workers entering the municipality for every one leaving. About 19.3% of the workforce coming into Boncourt are coming from outside Switzerland. Of the working population, 5.5% used public transportation to get to work, and 60.1% used a private car.

== Religion ==
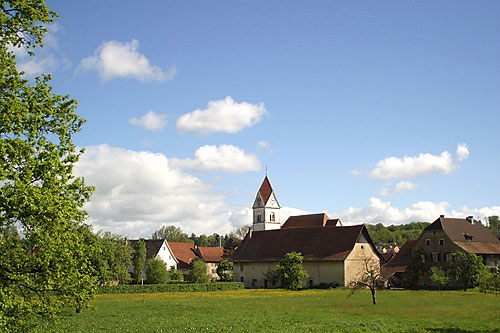
Boncourt church

From the 2000 census, 1,184 or 87.2% were Roman Catholic, while 82 or 6.0% belonged to the Swiss Reformed Church. Of the rest of the population, there were 8 individuals (or about 0.59% of the population) who belonged to another Christian church. There were 4 individuals (or about 0.29% of the population) who were Jewish, and 4 (or about 0.29% of the population) who were Islamic. There was 1 person who was Hindu and 1 individual who belonged to another church. 37 (or about 2.72% of the population) belonged to no church, are agnostic or atheist, and 40 individuals (or about 2.95% of the population) did not answer the question.

== Education ==
In Boncourt about 428 or (31.5%) of the population have completed non-mandatory upper secondary education, and 94 or (6.9%) have completed additional higher education (either university or a Fachhochschule). Of the 94 who completed tertiary schooling, 67.0% were Swiss men, 21.3% were Swiss women, 9.6% were non-Swiss men.

The Canton of Jura school system provides two year of non-obligatory Kindergarten, followed by six years of Primary school. This is followed by three years of obligatory lower Secondary school where the students are separated according to ability and aptitude. Following the lower Secondary students may attend a three or four year optional upper Secondary school followed by some form of Tertiary school or they may enter an apprenticeship.

During the 2009–10 school year, there were a total of 96 students attending 5 classes in Boncourt. There was one kindergarten class with a total of 22 students in the municipality. The municipality had 4 primary classes and 74 students. There are only nine Secondary schools in the canton, so all the students from Boncourt attend their secondary school in another municipality.

As of 2000, there was one student in Boncourt who came from another municipality, while 72 residents attended schools outside the municipality.

== Transportation ==
Boncourt is connected to the SNCF network by a single track rail, which reopened in 2009. Boncourt is the first town on the Swiss border when traveling from Paris to Bern via Belfort. The SBB-CFF-FFS train runs from Delle at 33 minutes past each hour to Boncourt where it arrives at 36 minutes past the hour before continuing to the lake at Biel/Bienne.
