= Achleiten Castle (Limbach) =

Austrian Castle

Coordinates: 48°09′07″N 14°39′22″E

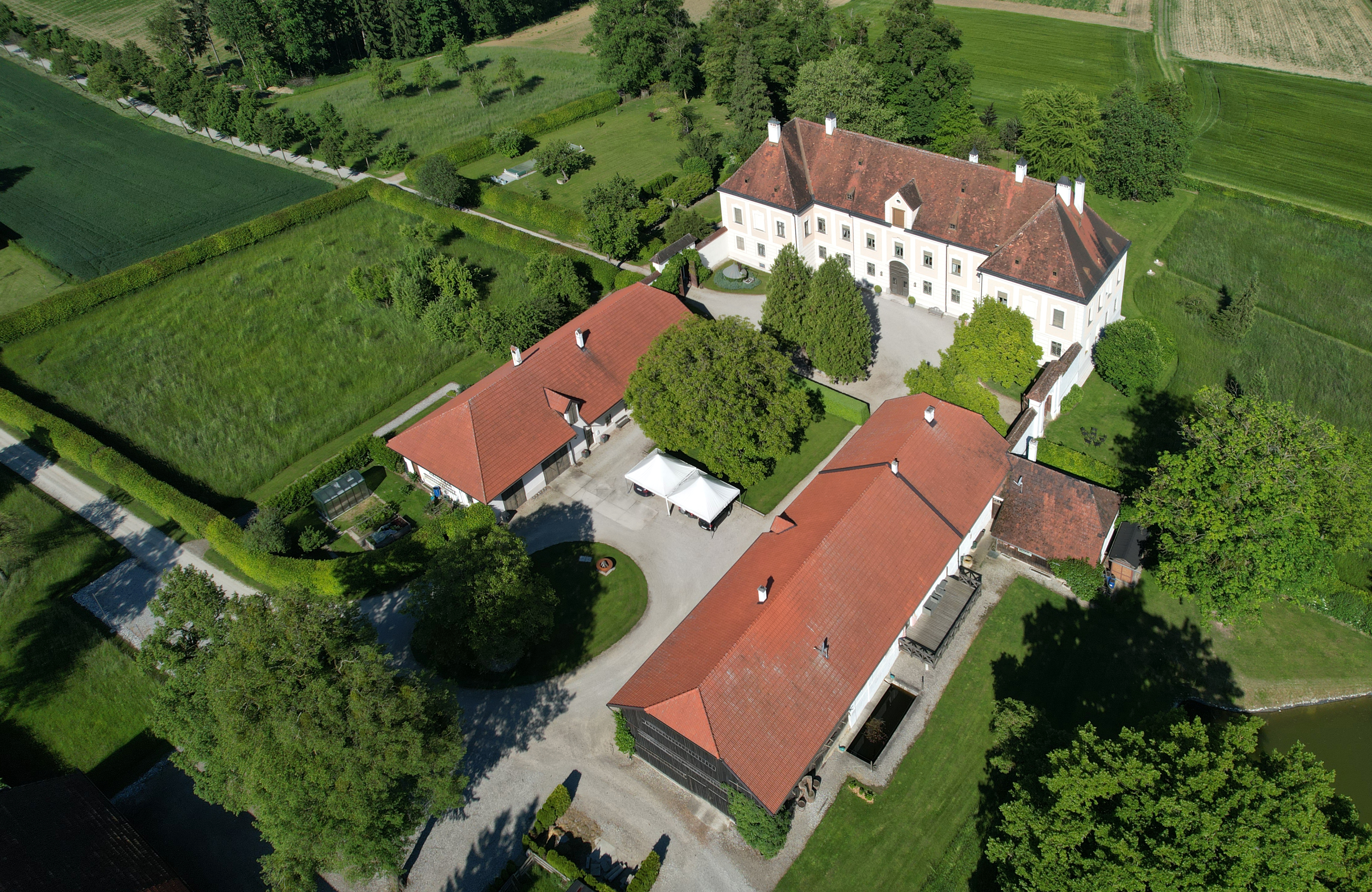
Achleiten Castle

Achleiten Castle (German: Schloss Achleiten) is a castle in the Amstetten District of Lower Austria. It is located in Limbach, a cadastral municipality of Strengberg.

== History ==
Before 1011, the Bavarian Benedictine monastery of Tegernsee owned land in the municipality. Through an exchange of goods with the German King Henry II, it was able to increase its territory by 60 royal acres. The monastery established its Achleiten domain here, the center of which was the castle, which Georg Matthäus Vischer depicted in 1672.

The complex, which was fortified with towers, was located near the Danube and was constantly threatened by flooding. Between 1727 and 1734, Abbot Gregor I Plaichshirn had the current castle built on the safe site of a farmhouse. It served as a summer residence for the Tegernsee Benedictines until 1803. In 1836, it came into the possession of the Barons von Blomberg. They had the castle chapel demolished. The ecclesiastical objects were given to the local priest. For example, the altarpiece of St. Nicholas hangs in the chapel of today's community kindergarten. In 1861, the last part of the building, a round tower, was demolished. In 1894, the castle was sold to Jaromír von Škoda, the brother of the founder of the Škoda Works, Emil von Škoda. The Barons von Weichs eventually inherited the estate and are still the owners of the property today.

== See also ==
- List of castles in Austria
