= Didier of Rennes =

7th century bishop

Saint Didier
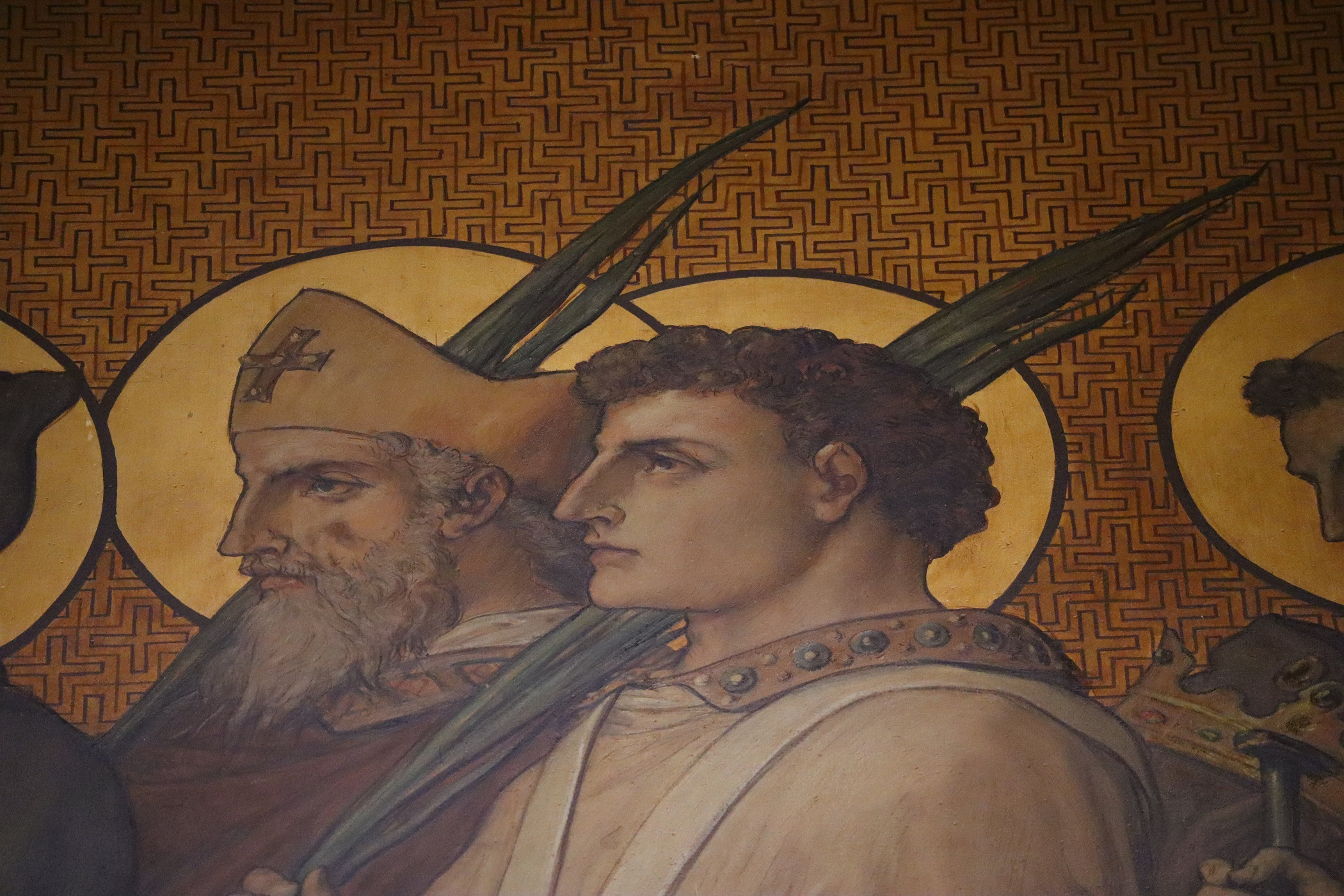
- Saint Didier and Saint Rainfroi
- Born: 7th century Rennes
- Venerated in: Roman Catholicism
- Feast: 18 September

Saint Didier of Rennes was a 7th-century bishop; he was born in Rennes, in Brittany, and died near what is now called Saint-Dizier-l'Évêque in the Territoire de Belfort, in France.

== Biography ==
Didier was born in Rennes in the 7th century, where he studied and became bishop about 660. He assisted at a Synod of Reims in 682.

He resigned and went on a pilgrimage to Rome in a group that included his deacon, Saint Reinfroid. On their return they passed through German lands and then south of the Vosges, near today's Saint-Dizier-l'Évêque and was welcomed in the local church.

Having preached there, he went on the road again but was soon attacked by robbers who killed him and his acolytes near the village of Croix, Territoire de Belfort. Didier was buried in the church and a cult arose around him as is attested in a 727 charter in Murbach Abbey. Various miracles are ascribed to him. His feast day is 18 September.

== The feet of Saint Dizier ==
A rock named "The step of the devil and the feet of Saint Didier", found near Saint-Dizier-l'Évêque, has indentations that local legend claims are the remains of a struggle between the devil and the saint.

== Towns named for Saint Didier ==
Many communities in France are named for this Saint Didier including Saint-Didier, Ille-et-Vilaine, but many honor other saints of the same name.

== See also ==
- Bishop of Rennes

== Bibliography ==
- Kessler, Fritz; Baudouin, Marcel (1914). "Les Pas du Diable et les Pieds de Saint-Dizier (Territoire de Belfort)". Bulletin de la Société préhistorique de France. 11 (8): 377–390. doi:10.3406/bspf.1914.7085.
