= Blumberg (surname) =

Blumberg is a surname of German origin. The word is composed of "blum(e)" (which means "flower") and "berg" (which means "mount, mountain"), and refers to hilly places covered with flowers. German, Dutch, Scandinavian, and anglicized variant spellings are Blumenberg, Blomberg, Bloemberg, and Bloomberg. Many with the name are of Ashkenazi descent; its Sephardi equivalent is Montefiore.

== List of people surnamed Blumberg ==
- Albert Blumberg (1906–1997), philosophy professor who went on to be active within the American Communist party
- Alex Blumberg, producer for the radio and television show This American Life
- Axel Blumberg (1981–2004), Argentine student who was kidnapped and killed
- Baruch Samuel Blumberg (1925–2011), American scientist who identified the Hepatitis B virus
- Carol Joyce Blumberg, American statistician
- Emily Blumberg, American physician and academic administrator
- George Blumberg (1903–1960), American politician from New York
- Jacob Moritz Blumberg (1873–1955), German surgeon and gynecologist
- Juan Carlos Blumberg, Argentine textile entrepreneur, father of Axel
- Judy Blumberg (born 1960), American ice dancer
- Mark Blumberg (born 1961), American psychologist
- Rachel Blumberg, American musician
- Skip Blumberg, American video artist and TV-producer
- Stephen Blumberg (born 1948), American convicted schizophrenic bibliomaniac
- William Blumberg (born 1998), American tennis player

== See also ==
- Jeff Bloemberg (born 1968), Canadian ice-hockey player
- Blomberg (surname)
- Bloomberg (disambiguation)
- Blumberg, a town in Germany
- Blumberg theorem
- Blumbergs (masculine), Blumberga (feminine), the Latvian-language spelling of the surname
- Blumenberg (surname)
