= Bloomsburg =

Bloomsburg may refer to:

== Places ==
- Bloomsburg, Ontario, Canada
- Bloomsburg, Pennsylvania, United States
- Bloomsburg (Watkins House), a historic plantation estate in South Boston, Virginia, US

== Other ==
- Bloomsburg University of Pennsylvania
- Bloomsburg Formation, a bedrock unit in the eastern United States

== See also ==
- Bloomberg (disambiguation)
- Blomberg (disambiguation)
- Bloomburg, Texas, a town
- Blumberg, a municipality in Baden-Württemberg, Germany
