= Blomberg (surname) =

Blomberg is a surname. Notable people with the surname include:

- Freiherr von Blomberg family
- Barbara Blomberg (1527–1597), mistress of Charles V
- Astrid Blomberg (born 1937), Swedish curler
- Craig Blomberg (born 1955), American theologian
- Hugo von Blomberg (1820–1871), German artist and poet
- Jaakko Blomberg (1942–2025), Finnish diplomat
- Jan Axel Blomberg (born 1969), Norwegian drummer
- Leif Blomberg (1941–1998), Swedish trade unionist and politician
- Martin P. Blomberg (1888–1966), Swedish-American engineer
- Ole Didrik Blomberg (born 2000), Norwegian footballer
- Ron Blomberg (born 1948), American baseball player
- Sebastian Blomberg (born 1972), German actor
- Werner von Blomberg (1878–1946), German politician and military officer

== See also ==
- Bloomberg (disambiguation)
