= Blumenberg =

Blumenberg may refer to:

- Blumenberg (surname)
- Blumenberg, Cologne, part of Chorweiler, Cologne, Germany
- Blumenberg (quarry), near Eichstätt, Bavaria, Germany, notable as a site of fossil discoveries
- Blumenberg, village in Wanzleben-Börde, Saxony-Anhalt, Germany
- Blumenberg, German name of the town now known as Florimont, Territoire de Belfort, Franche-Comté, France
- Hans Blumenberg, 20th century German philosopher
- Blumenberg, 2011 novel by Sibylle Lewitscharoff

== See also ==
- Blumberg, a municipality in Baden-Württemberg, Germany
- Blumberg (surname)
