= Blomberg =

Blomberg may refer to:

== People ==
- Blomberg (surname), a surname (including a list of people with the name).
- Freiherr von Blomberg family

== Places ==
- Blomberg, North Rhine-Westphalia, a town in the district of Lippe, North Rhine-Westphalia, Germany
- Blomberg, Lower Saxony, a municipality in the district of Wittmund, Lower Saxony, Germany

== Other uses ==
- Blomberg B, a "B" diesel locomotive truck
- Blomberg's toad, a species of toad
- Blomberg, a household appliance brand owned by Arçelik

== See also ==
- Blomberg–Fritsch affair
- Bloomberg (disambiguation)
