= Canton of Delle =

Coordinates: 47.51°N 7.00°E

- Canton
- Situation of the canton of Delle in the department of Territoire de Belfort
- Country: France
- Region: Bourgogne-Franche-Comté
- Department: Territoire de Belfort
- No. of communes: {{{nbcomm}}}
- Population (2023): 17,303
- INSEE code: 9006

The canton of Delle is an administrative division of the Territoire de Belfort department, northeastern France. Its borders were modified at the French canton reorganisation which came into effect in March 2015. Its seat is in Delle.

It consists of the following communes:

1. Beaucourt
2. Courcelles
3. Courtelevant
4. Croix
5. Delle
6. Faverois
7. Fêche-l'Église
8. Florimont
9. Joncherey
10. Lebetain
11. Lepuix-Neuf
12. Montbouton
13. Réchésy
14. Saint-Dizier-l'Évêque
15. Thiancourt
16. Villars-le-Sec
