= Montbouton =

- Commune
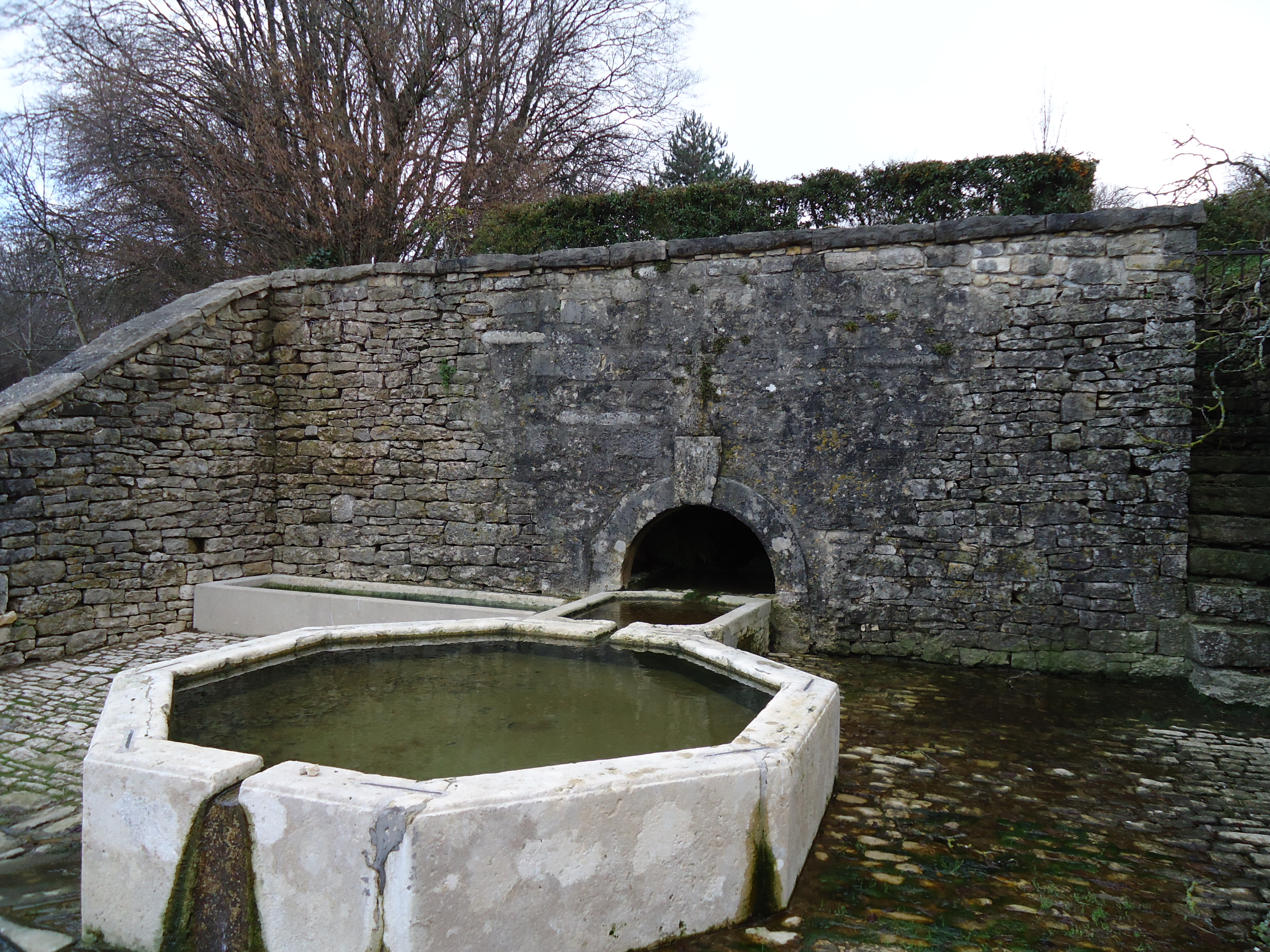
- Saint Léger fountain

- Coat of arms
- Location of Montbouton
- Location within France Location within Bourgogne-Franche-Comté
- Coordinates: 47°28′25″N 6°55′12″E
- Country: France
- Region: Bourgogne-Franche-Comté
- Department: Territoire de Belfort
- Arrondissement: Belfort
- Canton: Delle
- Intercommunality: Sud Territoire

Government
  - Mayor (2020–2026): Gilles Perrin
- Area^{1}: 2.81 km^{2} (1.08 sq mi)
- Highest elevation: 583 m (1,913 ft)
- Lowest elevation: 420 m (1,380 ft)
- Population (2023): 422
  - Density: 150/km^{2} (389/sq mi)
- Time zone: UTC+01:00 (CET)
  - Summer (DST): UTC+02:00 (CEST)
- INSEE/Postal code: 90070 /90500
- ^{1} French Land Register data, which excludes lakes, ponds, glaciers > 1 km^{2} (0.386 sq mi or 247 acres) and river estuaries.

Montbouton (French pronunciation: [mɔ̃butɔ̃]) is a commune in the Territoire de Belfort department in Bourgogne-Franche-Comté in northeastern France.

== See also ==
- Communes of the Territoire de Belfort department
