= Guilé Foundation =

Swiss non-profit organization of Swiss private law

Fondation Guilé is a Swiss foundation. This non-profit organization of Swiss private law was founded in 1997 by the Charles Burrus family headquartered in Boncourt, Switzerland. The foundation’s mission is to promote corporate responsibility in the process of globalization, focusing on human and labour rights, environmental protection and business ethics. The foundation supports and promotes the ten principles of the United Nations Global Compact through the engagement with companies about their sustainability and corporate responsibility efforts and by organizing high-level events on the topic. The foundation defines its role as “catalyst in helping companies implement and report on the ten principles of the Global Compact” according to the founders Nado and Charles Burrus.

== Company assessments and engagement ==
Fondation Guilé has initiated two investment funds to promote its goals. The Guilé European Engagement Fund (GEEF) was set up in 2006 and is independently managed by de Pury Pictet Turrettini in Geneva, Switzerland. The fund is made up of approximately 45 European companies.

The Guilé Emerging Markets Engagement Fund (GEMEF) was set up in 2009 and is managed by Comgest in Paris, France. This fund contains roughly 45 companies. De Pury Pictet Turrettini and Comgest are both signatories of the United Nations Principles for Responsible Investment initiative. The fund has officially closed its activity in 2020.

The sustainability experts at Fondation Guilé analyse and benchmark the annual Communication on Progress (COP) and/or the sustainability reporting of all portfolio companies. The assessments focus on the four topical areas of the UNGC - human rights, labour standards, the environment and anti-corruption - and are based on publicly available information only. The assessments are aimed at determining strengths and areas for improvement to help each company further improve its commitment.

The portfolio companies receive the assessment results and a detailed presentation of the findings. The assessment and benchmark is offered to each portfolio company free of charge. The costs are borne by the investors through the fund’s management fee.

== High-level meetings ==
Since 2008, Fondation Guilé has organized and co-hosted a series of private events on the UNGC during the World Economic Forum Annual Meeting in Davos, Switzerland. These meetings bring together high-level representatives of companies, investors, academia, governments as well as the United Nations and aim at strengthening the UNGC and enhancing its impact. In 2011, the Swiss Federal Department of Foreign Affairs, the Global Compact Office, KPMG and Novo Nordisk co-hosted an event which focused on the UNGC's "Blueprint for Corporate Sustainability Leadership". UN Secretary-General Ban Ki-moon was the special guest.

Other speakers at the 2011 event included Timothy P. Flynn, Chairman of KPMG International; Kris Gopalakrishman, CEO and Managing Director of Infosys Technologies; Lise Kingo, Executive Vice President & Chief of Staff of Novo Nordisk; Ditlev Engel, CEO of Vestas; Régis Burrus, Vice Chairman of Fondation Guilé; Robert Greenhill, Managing Director of the World Economic Forum; Ambassador Martin Dahinden, Director General of the Swiss Agency for Development and Cooperation; John Weeks, IMD Professor of Leadership and Organizational Change; Peter Maurer, Secretary of State of the Swiss Federal Ministry of Foreign Affairs; and Georg Kell, Executive Director of the Global Compact.

During the World Economic Forum Annual Meeting 2012, Fondation Guilé co-hosted the UN Global Compact LEAD Luncheon. The goal of the meeting was to review the LEAD initiative as well as to discuss priorities for the Rio+20 process. UN Secretary-General Ban Ki-moon, Heads of UN Agencies, Funds and Programmes, LEAD Chief Executives and high-level representatives from PRI and PRME were among the participants of the event.

== Additional services ==
Fondation Guilé also served in an advisory capacity to the UNGC Office for the development and drafting of the Blueprint for Corporate Sustainability Leadership.
