= Fêche-l'Église =

- Commune
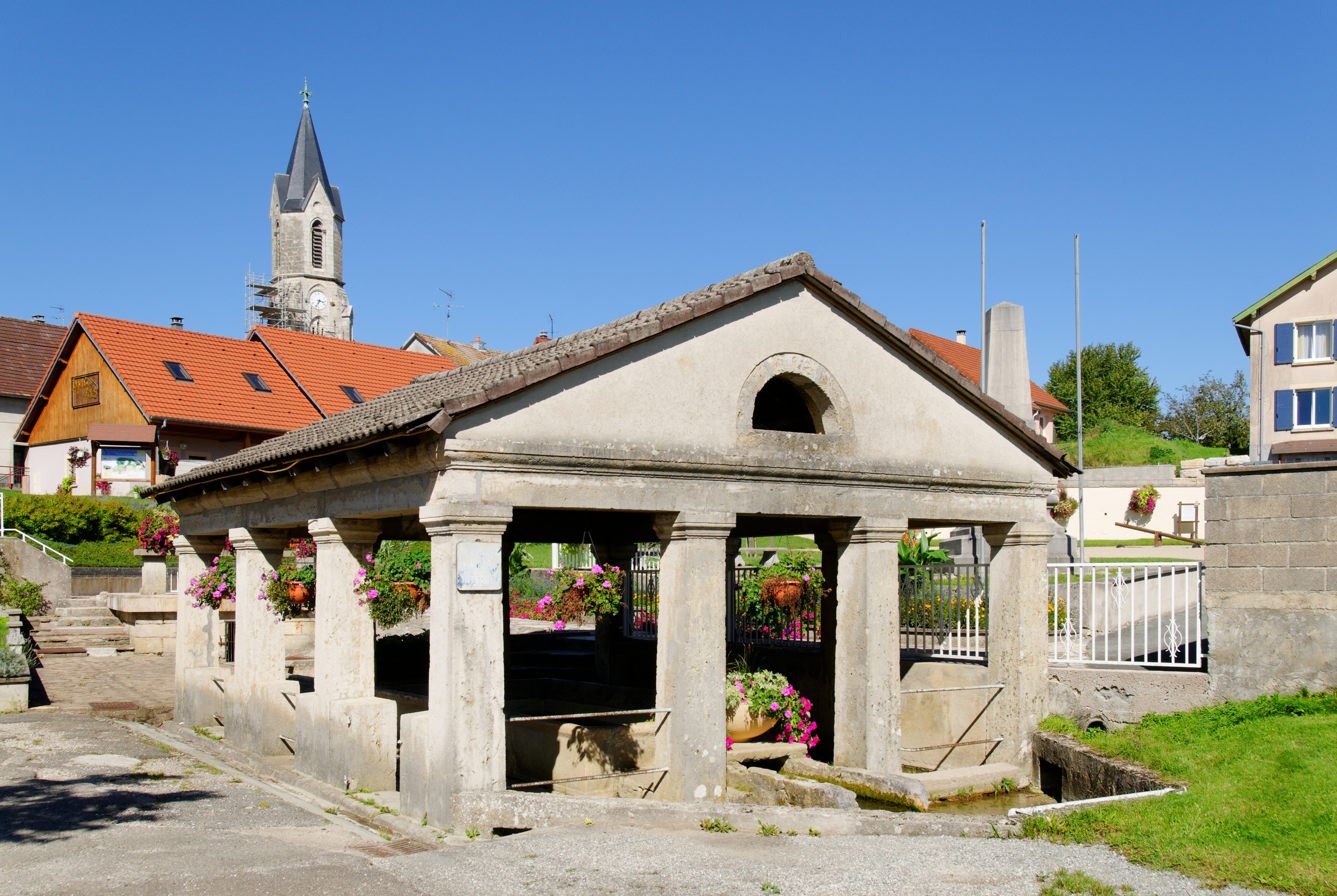
- The lavoir in Fêche-l'Église

- Coat of arms
- Location of Fêche-l'Église
- Location within France Location within Bourgogne-Franche-Comté
- Coordinates: 47°30′21″N 6°57′09″E
- Country: France
- Region: Bourgogne-Franche-Comté
- Department: Territoire de Belfort
- Arrondissement: Belfort
- Canton: Delle
- Intercommunality: Sud Territoire

Government
  - Mayor (2020–2026): Thierry Marcjan
- Area^{1}: 3.93 km^{2} (1.52 sq mi)
- Highest elevation: 460 m (1,510 ft)
- Lowest elevation: 352 m (1,155 ft)
- Population (2023): 702
  - Density: 179/km^{2} (463/sq mi)
- Time zone: UTC+01:00 (CET)
  - Summer (DST): UTC+02:00 (CEST)
- INSEE/Postal code: 90045 /90100
- ^{1} French Land Register data, which excludes lakes, ponds, glaciers > 1 km^{2} (0.386 sq mi or 247 acres) and river estuaries.

Fêche-l'Église (French pronunciation: [fɛʃ leɡliz]) is a commune in the Territoire de Belfort department in Bourgogne-Franche-Comté in northeastern France.

== See also ==
- Communes of the Territoire de Belfort department
