= Florimont =

- Commune
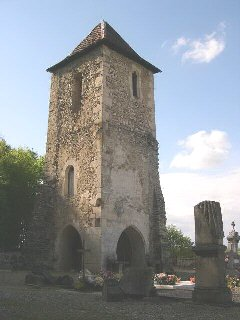
- Old bell tower

- Coat of arms
- Location of Florimont
- Location within France Location within Bourgogne-Franche-Comté
- Coordinates: 47°30′42″N 7°04′07″E
- Country: France
- Region: Bourgogne-Franche-Comté
- Department: Territoire de Belfort
- Arrondissement: Belfort
- Canton: Delle
- Intercommunality: Sud Territoire

Government
  - Mayor (2020–2026): Sophie Philippe
- Area^{1}: 18.19 km^{2} (7.02 sq mi)
- Highest elevation: 505 m (1,657 ft)
- Lowest elevation: 367 m (1,204 ft)
- Population (2023): 473
  - Density: 26.0/km^{2} (67.3/sq mi)
- Time zone: UTC+01:00 (CET)
  - Summer (DST): UTC+02:00 (CEST)
- INSEE/Postal code: 90046 /90100
- ^{1} French Land Register data, which excludes lakes, ponds, glaciers > 1 km^{2} (0.386 sq mi or 247 acres) and river estuaries.

Florimont (French pronunciation: [flɔʁimɔ̃]; Frainc-Comtou: Çhoûerimont) is a commune in the Territoire de Belfort department in Bourgogne-Franche-Comté in northeastern France.

== Geography ==
Florimont, at 384 m, lies 5 km east of Delle and about 21 km southeast the city Belfort (as the crow flies). The village extends in the transient area between the flat country of the Belfort Gap and the northern foothills of the Juras, in the Coeuvatte valley at the north foothills of Florimont, close to the border with Switzerland.

The village that in 2023 had a population of 473, had 398 in 1803. The area is relatively large: 18.19 km ² and extends over a dozen kilometers from north to south. Florimont, which was an important manor in the Middle Ages, incorporated into its territory the disappeared villages of Normanvillars and Saint-Andre-d'Essert.

=== Placenames and hamlets ===
Saint-André-d'Essert

This village, of which there only remains the farm of Saint-André, one kilometer from Faverois, should not be confused with the city of Essert, near Belfort, although the origin of the name is undoubtedly the same: a cultivable ground reclaimed from the forest. In the seventeenth century Saint-André had a church which would have already existed sometime between 1274 and at least 1466, when a priest officiated there. It was restored in 1606 but was threatened with ruin in 1749. By the end of the eighteenth century all that remained there were four Anabaptist families, and the church disappeared. The hamlet belongs to the parish of Faverois. In texts written in German, Essert is Germanized as Schert.

Normanvillars

Normanvillars was a Mennonite settlement on the border of the Sundgau (southern Alsace) and the Territory of Belfort in a forest area called by that name. It was about 10–15 miles (16–25 km) northeast of Montbéliard, southeast of Belfort, and north of Delle. The settlement was established between 1747 and 1780 by Mennonite families coming from the Swiss Jura to the south and a few Amish families coming from the Montbéliard area to the southwest. By 1791, according to a military census, 23 of the 97 families in the commune of Florimont were Mennonite. By the end of the eighteenth century this rather extended settlement was divided into two organized congregations, both meeting in homes, the one to the north called La Maie (later Belfort), the one in the south called Florimont. The first meetinghouse at Normanvillars, the Chapelle des Fermes, was erected in 1849 after many members had emigrated. The beginning of emigration to North America was in 1819. A number of families settled in Putnam County, Ohio, others in western Waterloo County, Ontario.

It is probable that Normanvillars disappeared at the same time as Saint-André d'Essert, in the second half of the fifteenth century, victim of the instability which reigned then in the countryside. In the middle of the eighteenth century, the Mennonites, famous for being experienced farmers, took possession again of the places and formed a locality dependent on the seigniory of Florimont. Nowadays, the hamlet is summarized as being a few farms spread over a vast clearing in the middle of which is a chapel known as the Chappel of the Mennonites and a cemetery.

== History ==
The site of Florimont has been occupied since the Roman period, probably by a lookout tower charged with supervising the movement of troops on their way connecting Mandeure in Doubs to Augst and Kembs in Haut-Rhin. After the creation of the county of Ferrette in the eleventh century, the feudal castle and the fortifications of the village were built which very quickly took up importance. In the thirteenth century, the stronghold, which also covered Courcelles, Suarce, Chavanatte, Lepuix-Neuf and partly Faverois, Grosne, Boron, Réchésy, was held by the Blumenberg family, a German name that can translate as Mountain of the flowers. The grounds of Florimont were on several occasions the object of contention between the bishop of Basle and the count of Ferrette. By the fifteenth century, the economic importance of the city is not negligible as it holds a weekly market and two annual fairs, one at All Saints' Day and the other on the Tuesday of Easter.

In 1583 a fire destroyed the castle which was rebuilt. During the Thirty Years' War, around 1632, the Swedish troops, which devastated the countryside around Belfort, plundered the city and the castle, not being concerned with its ruins.

During the French Revolution, the population of Florimont expressed their attachment to their lord, Xavier de Ferrette, while addressing a letter of protest to the Directory, when he was put on the list of émigrés and, as a result, considered a traitor to the country. That did not prevent the family's goods from being confiscated.

== See also ==
- Communes of the Territoire de Belfort department
