= Thiancourt =

- Commune
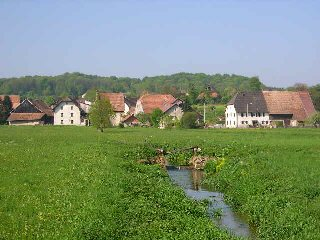
- Village overview
- Location of Thiancourt
- Location within France Location within Bourgogne-Franche-Comté
- Coordinates: 47°31′24″N 6°59′25″E
- Country: France
- Region: Bourgogne-Franche-Comté
- Department: Territoire de Belfort
- Arrondissement: Belfort
- Canton: Delle

Government
  - Mayor (2020–2026): Roland Damotte
- Area^{1}: 2.67 km^{2} (1.03 sq mi)
- Highest elevation: 424 m (1,391 ft)
- Lowest elevation: 349 m (1,145 ft)
- Population (2023): 286
  - Density: 107/km^{2} (277/sq mi)
- Time zone: UTC+01:00 (CET)
  - Summer (DST): UTC+02:00 (CEST)
- INSEE/Postal code: 90096 /90100
- ^{1} French Land Register data, which excludes lakes, ponds, glaciers > 1 km^{2} (0.386 sq mi or 247 acres) and river estuaries.

Thiancourt (French pronunciation: [tjɑ̃kuʁ]) is a commune in the Territoire de Belfort department in Bourgogne-Franche-Comté in northeastern France.

== See also ==
- Communes of the Territoire de Belfort department
