= Blumbergs =

Family name

Blumbergs (masculine), Blumberga (feminine), is the Latvian-language spelling of the surname Blumberg. Notable people with this surname include:

- Agnese Blumberga (born 1971), Soviet and Latvian tennis player
- Laimonis Blumbergs (1919–2014), Latvian sculptor
- Santa Blumberga (born 1994), Latvian curler and coach
