= Courtelevant =

- Commune
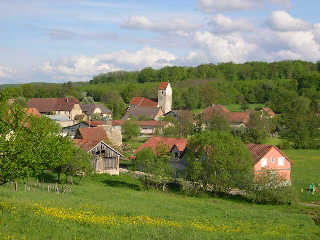
- The commune of Courtelevant

- Coat of arms
- Location of Courtelevant
- Location within France Location within Bourgogne-Franche-Comté
- Coordinates: 47°31′05″N 7°04′51″E
- Country: France
- Region: Bourgogne-Franche-Comté
- Department: Territoire de Belfort
- Arrondissement: Belfort
- Canton: Delle
- Intercommunality: Sud Territoire

Government
  - Mayor (2020–2026): Bernard Valkre
- Area^{1}: 5.82 km^{2} (2.25 sq mi)
- Highest elevation: 454 m (1,490 ft)
- Lowest elevation: 385 m (1,263 ft)
- Population (2023): 379
  - Density: 65.1/km^{2} (169/sq mi)
- Time zone: UTC+01:00 (CET)
  - Summer (DST): UTC+02:00 (CEST)
- INSEE/Postal code: 90028 /90100
- ^{1} French Land Register data, which excludes lakes, ponds, glaciers > 1 km^{2} (0.386 sq mi or 247 acres) and river estuaries.

Courtelevant (French pronunciation: [kuʁtəlvɑ̃]) is a commune in the Territoire de Belfort department in Bourgogne-Franche-Comté in northeastern France.

== See also ==
- Communes of the Territoire de Belfort department
