= Croix, Territoire de Belfort =

Croix
- Commune
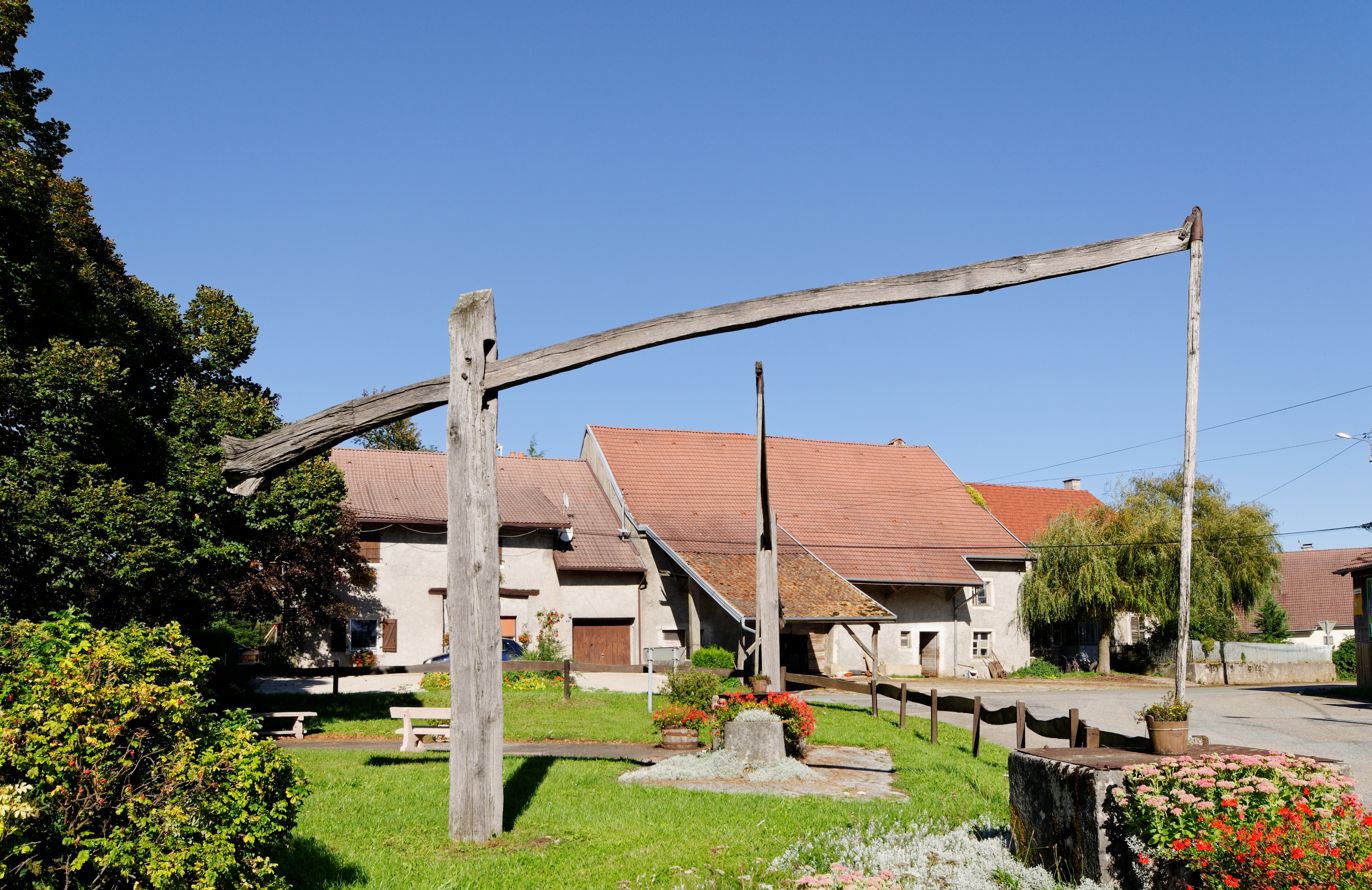
- The village centre and a balance well

- Coat of arms
- Location of Croix
- Location within France Location within Bourgogne-Franche-Comté
- Coordinates: 47°26′46″N 6°57′19″E
- Country: France
- Region: Bourgogne-Franche-Comté
- Department: Territoire de Belfort
- Arrondissement: Belfort
- Canton: Delle
- Intercommunality: Sud Territoire

Government
  - Mayor (2020–2026): Claude Monnier
- Area^{1}: 5.41 km^{2} (2.09 sq mi)
- Highest elevation: 612 m (2,008 ft)
- Lowest elevation: 548 m (1,798 ft)
- Population (2023): 180
  - Density: 33/km^{2} (86/sq mi)
- Time zone: UTC+01:00 (CET)
  - Summer (DST): UTC+02:00 (CEST)
- INSEE/Postal code: 90030 /90100
- ^{1} French Land Register data, which excludes lakes, ponds, glaciers > 1 km^{2} (0.386 sq mi or 247 acres) and river estuaries.

Croix (French pronunciation: [kʁwa]; Frainc-Comtou: Croux) is a commune in the Territoire de Belfort department in Bourgogne-Franche-Comté in northeastern France.

== History ==
=== Medieval legend ===
According to local tradition, Saints Dizier and Regenfroi were murdered around 675 on the site where the village of Croix later developed. The legend recounts that Dizier had just planted a staff in the form of a cross and begun praying when brigands attacked him. Before dying, he instructed his servant Villibert—who had only been wounded—to have their bodies buried in an oratory dedicated to Saint Martin located about three kilometres to the north. The oratory is said to have stood where the present church of Saint-Dizier-l’Évêque now rises.

=== Church history ===
By 1232, Croix had long possessed a church, which the monks of Lucelle Abbey were responsible for maintaining. The Abbey of Murbach also held rights in the parish, which it transferred in 1274 to Thierry III, Count of Montbéliard. As the population grew with the development of the Beaucourt area, the church became too small and was rebuilt in 1852. After a fire in 1967, a new modern church building was inaugurated in 1971.

=== Built heritage ===
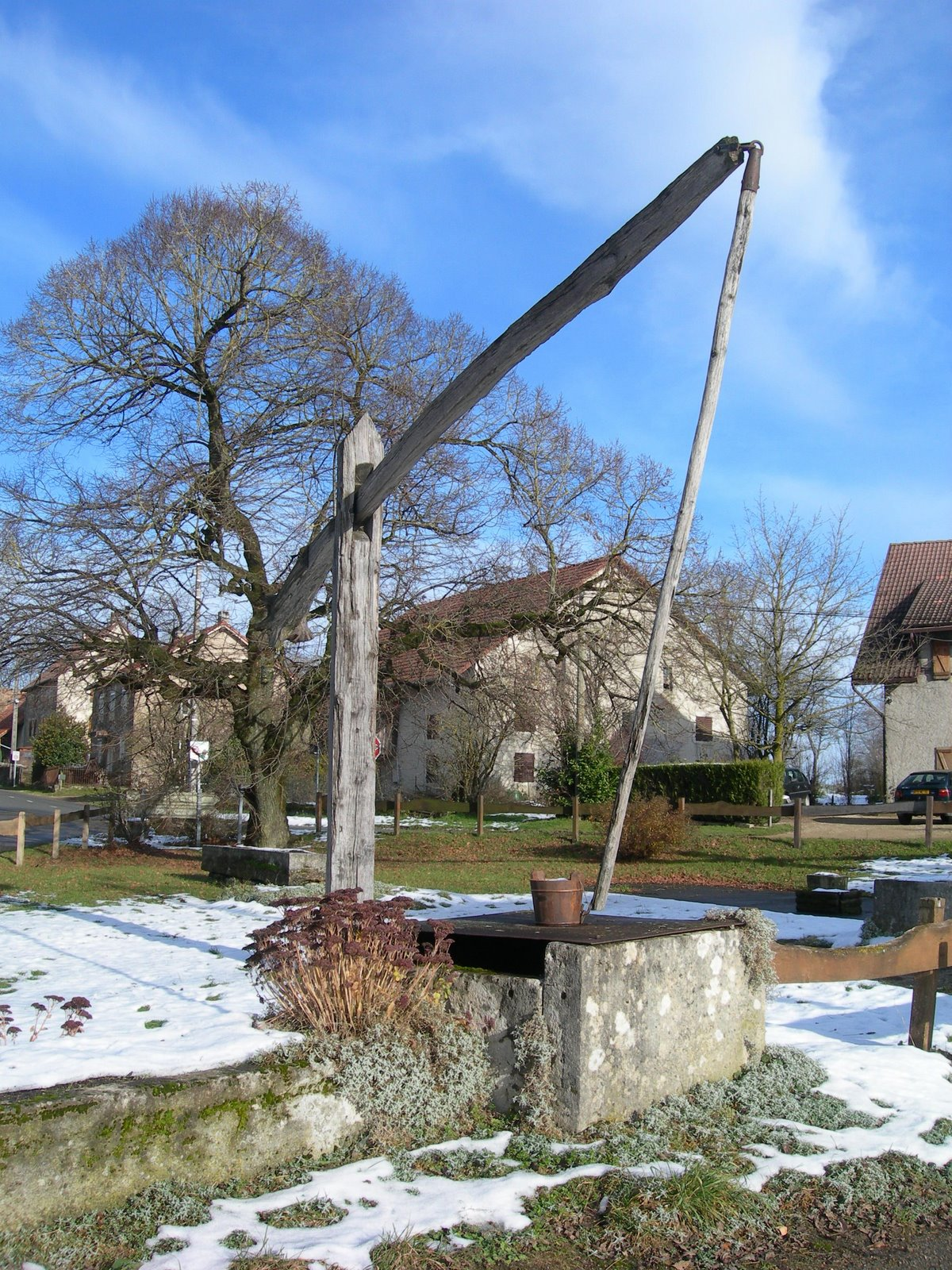
One of the balance-beam wells (puits à balancier) preserved in the centre of the village.

Two balance-beam wells (puits à balancier) have been preserved in the centre of the village.

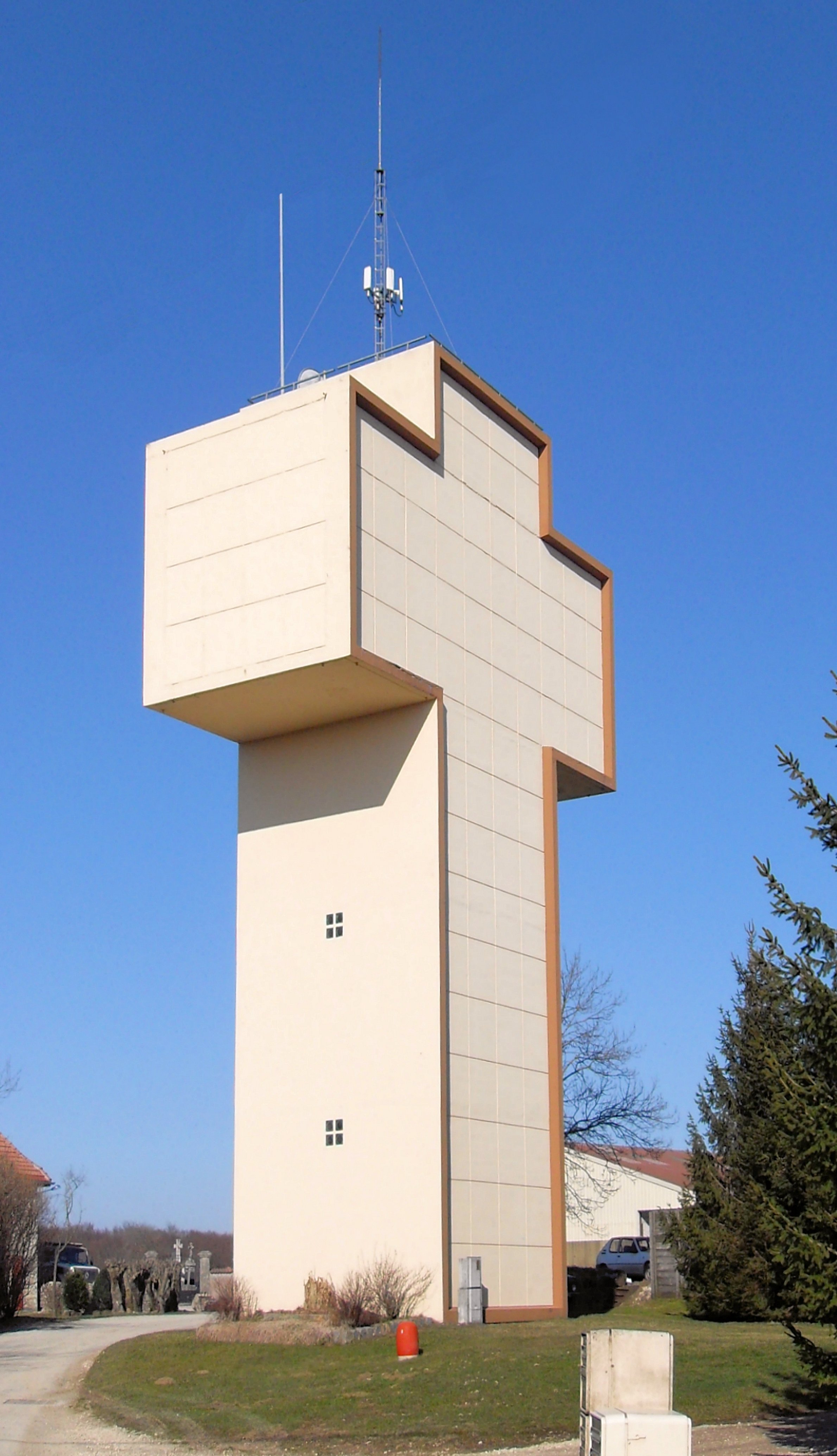
The cross-shaped water tower built in 1960.

The cross-shaped water tower built in 1960.

== See also ==
- Communes of the Territoire de Belfort department
