= Blumenberg (surname) =

Blumenberg is a German surname derived from the toponym Blumenberg ("flower hill" or "mountain"). Notable people with the surname include:

- Bettina Blumenberg (born 1962), German field hockey player
- Frida Blumenberg (born 1935), South African artist and sculptor
- Hans Blumenberg (1920–1996), German philosopher
