= Bloomberg =

Bloomberg may refer to:

== People ==
- Daniel J. Bloomberg (1905–1984), audio engineer
- Georgina Bloomberg (born 1983), professional equestrian
- Michael Bloomberg (born 1942), American businessman and founder of Bloomberg L.P.; politician and mayor of New York City (2002–2013)
- Ramon Bloomberg (born 1972), American artist and film director

== Other uses ==
- Bloomberg L.P., financial news and media company founded by Michael Bloomberg
  - Bloomberg News, a news agency
  - Bloomberg Businessweek, weekly business magazine and website
  - Bloomberg Markets, a monthly financial magazine
  - Bloomberg Radio, a business radio network
  - Bloomberg Television, a business news channel
    - Bloomberg TV Canada
    - Bloomberg TV Philippines
    - Bloomberg TV Malaysia
  - Bloomberg Terminal, desktop terminal and software widely used in the financial industry
  - Bloomberg Government, online news service covering governmental affairs
  - Bloomberg Law, an online legal research service
  - Bloomberg Tower, a skyscraper in New York City containing the headquarters of Bloomberg L.P.
  - Bloomberg Beta, an independent venture capital firm founded by Bloomberg L.P.
  - Bloomberg Philanthropies, American foundation
  - Bloomberg Tradebook, agency broker of Bloomberg L.P.
  - Bloomberg Global Identifier (BBGID), an open standard, unique identifier of securities
  - Bloomberg Commodity Index (BCOM), a broadly diversified commodity price index distributed by Bloomberg Indexes
- Johns Hopkins Bloomberg School of Public Health, part of Johns Hopkins University in Baltimore, Maryland, United States
- BNN Bloomberg, a Canadian business and financial news channel which operates as a partner of Bloomberg Television
- Lawrence Bloomberg Faculty of Nursing of the University of Toronto in Ontario, Canada

== See also ==
- Blomberg (disambiguation)
- Blumberg (surname)
