= Lepuix-Neuf =

- Commune
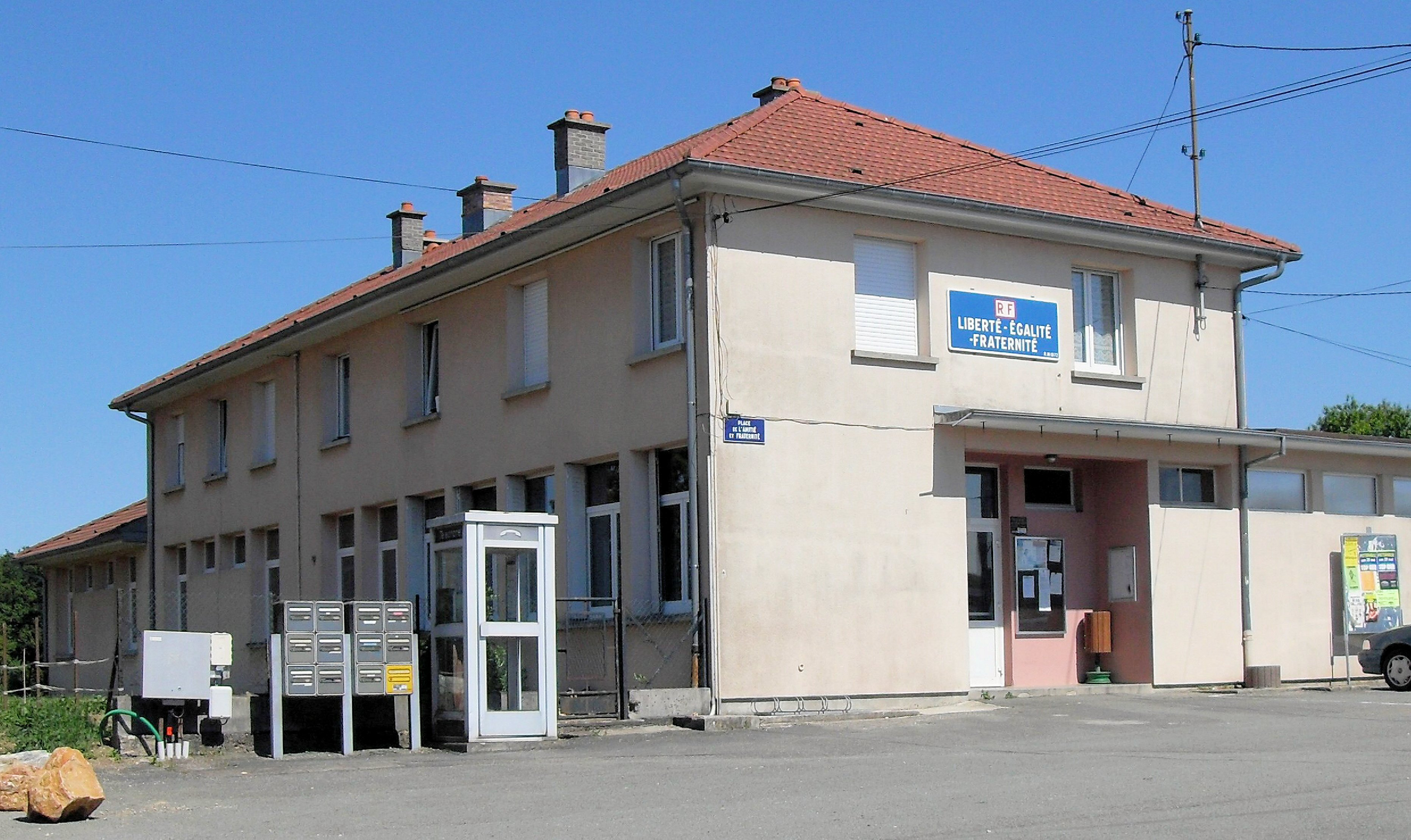
- Town hall
- Location of Lepuix-Neuf
- Location within France Location within Bourgogne-Franche-Comté
- Coordinates: 47°32′27″N 7°06′01″E
- Country: France
- Region: Bourgogne-Franche-Comté
- Department: Territoire de Belfort
- Arrondissement: Belfort
- Canton: Delle
- Intercommunality: Sud Territoire

Government
  - Mayor (2020–2026): Fabrice Petitjean
- Area^{1}: 5.46 km^{2} (2.11 sq mi)
- Highest elevation: 418 m (1,371 ft)
- Lowest elevation: 389 m (1,276 ft)
- Population (2023): 307
  - Density: 56.2/km^{2} (146/sq mi)
- Time zone: UTC+01:00 (CET)
  - Summer (DST): UTC+02:00 (CEST)
- INSEE/Postal code: 90064 /90100
- ^{1} French Land Register data, which excludes lakes, ponds, glaciers > 1 km^{2} (0.386 sq mi or 247 acres) and river estuaries.

Lepuix-Neuf (French pronunciation: [ləpɥi nœf]) is a commune in the Territoire de Belfort department in Bourgogne-Franche-Comté in northeastern France.

== See also ==
- Communes of the Territoire de Belfort department
