= Freiherr von Blomberg family =

German noble family

Blomberg
- Noble family
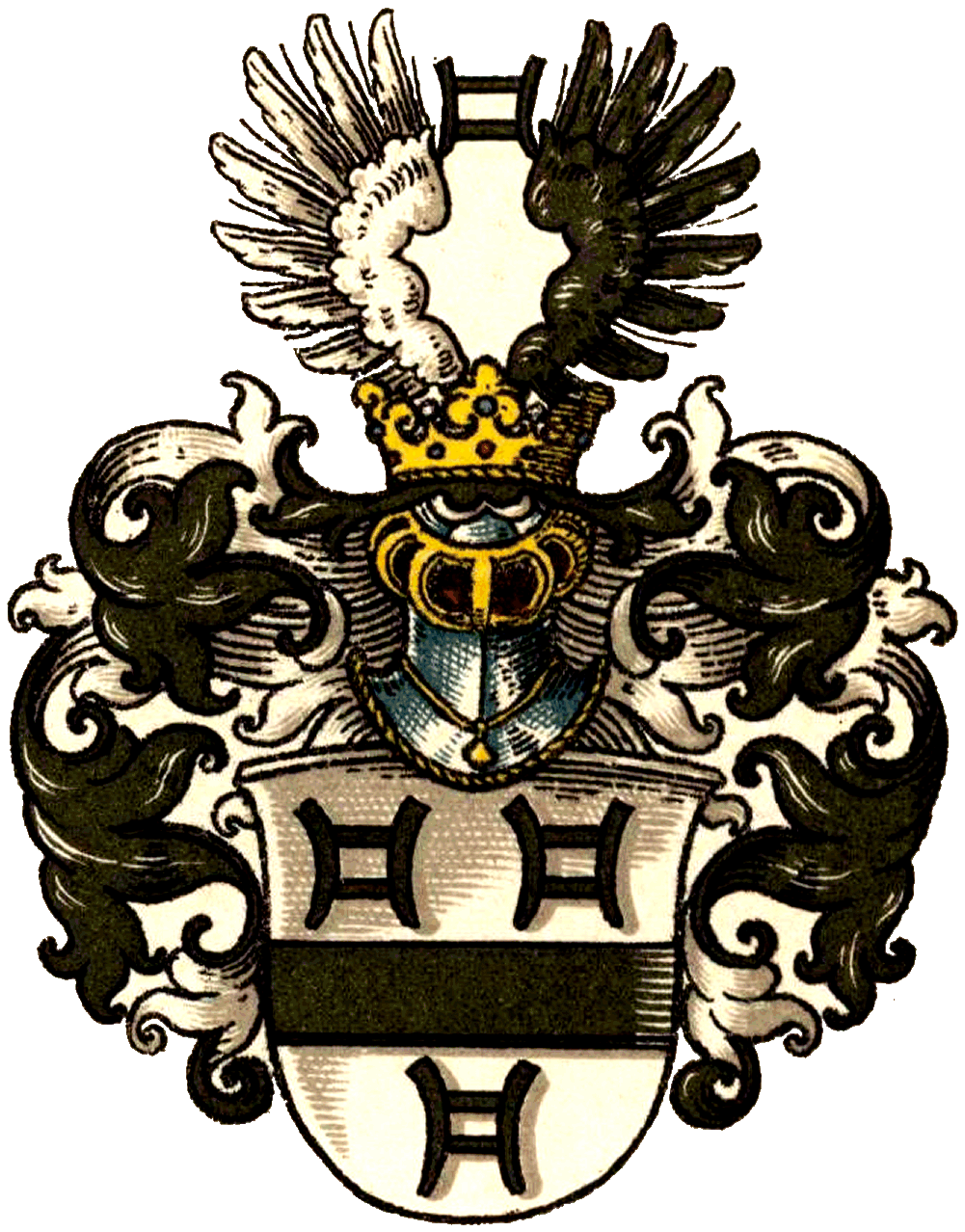
- Country: Germany: North Rhine-Westphalia
- Founded: 1231; 795 years ago
- Titles: Baron
- Members: Heinrich Ulrich Freiherr von Blomberg (1745–1813); Friedrich Freiherr von Blomberg; Wilhelm Freiherr von Blomberg (1788–1846); Werner von Blomberg (1878–1946); Hugo von Blomberg
- Cadet branches: Baltic states

The von Blomberg family refers to a German noble family, whose members held the title of Baron.

Freiherr is a German title of nobility. Situated between a Ritter (Chevalier) and a Graf (Comte), its modern equivalent is Baron. Blomberg is a German city in the middle of North Rhine-Westphalia, with Detmold as its capital, founded between 1231 and 1255.

== History ==
The Freiherr von Blomberg family was typically based around North-Rhine-Westfalia and Lower Saxony, though Bavarian extensions are frequent. During the centuries the Family line spread throughout Eastern Europe from the Baltic sea through to Romania. The first von Blomberg of prominence was Heinrich Ulrich Freiherr von Blomberg (1745–1813). Of the Bavarian branch, one member of the family (diametrically opposed to Heinrich Ulrich) was a devout Protestant, Friedrich Freiherr von Blomberg. His lineage can be traced to Strengberg, a town in Amstetten in Lower Austria. Little more than the following details of him are known: quoted from contemporary archival sources “in a church, in the chapel under the north façade, we can find an altar-painting of the Holy Nicolaus, patron-saint of the boatsmen. Originally, it hung in the chapel of the Schloss Achleiten. This chapel was entirely demolished in 1836, when the Schloss became the property of the protestant Friedrich Freiherr von Blomberg”.

== Wilhelm Freiherr von Blomberg (1788-1846) ==
The Lippische Landesbibliothek Detmold holds all Prussian scientific and military archives of the time. We can consult the writings of the Offizier and Schriftsteller (Chroniqer) Wilhelm Freiherr von Blomberg. He went to the military academy and became a Major in the army; his main task, however, was that of chronicler. In those military times, his job was to write about all things regarding military life: how much was paid, what manoeuvres had what result, who was disciplined, as well as writing uplifting poems.

In 1811, he was summoned to move from his casern situated in Lemgo to Bremen where Napoleon had just started what turned out to be his last campaign. (note: it may be of interest that the town of Lemgo witnessed a great amount of witch trials between 1667 and 1683). This was followed by another move in 1814 to do the same in Hamburg, for the same reason – both cities shortly were part of the French Empire until the Battle of Waterloo turned them German again. He stayed in Hamburg until 1842. In 1842, about a quarter of the inner city was destroyed in the "Great Fire". This fire started on the night of the 4 May 1842 and was extinguished on 8 May. It destroyed three churches, the town hall, and countless other buildings. It killed 51 people, and left an estimated 20,000 homeless. Reconstruction took more than 40 years.

The von Blomberg house was one of them: it was destroyed entirely, together with all its possessions and family archives. A broken man, he and his wife, Nina, and son moved to Lübeck in 1842 where, never having recovered from this tragedy, he remained until his death in 1846. His brother, Karl Alexander Freiherr von Blomberg (1886–1813), was equally an officer and chronicler, who died in Berlin in 1813.

== Werner von Blomberg (1878–1946) ==
Born in Stargard, Pomerania, German Empire, Werner von Blomberg joined the Preußischen Hauptkadettenanstalt in Groß-Lichterfelde (near Berlin) in 1897 and became a Lieutenant in a preußischen Füsilierregiment. After graduating in 1907, Blomberg entered the General Staff in 1908. Serving with distinction on the Western Front during World War I, he was awarded the Pour le Mérite. In 1920, von Blomberg was appointed Chief of Staff of the Döberitz Brigade and in 1921 was made Chief of Staff of the Stuttgart Army Area. In 1925, Blomberg was made Chief of Army Training by General Hans von Seeckt. By 1927 Blomberg was a major-general and Chief of the Troop Office. After arguing with the powerful General Kurt von Schleicher in 1929, however, Blomberg was removed from his post and made military commander of East Prussia.

In 1933, Blomberg rose to national prominence when he was appointed Minister of Defense in Adolf Hitler's government. Blomberg became one of Hitler's most devoted followers, and as such was nicknamed "Rubber Lion" by some of his critics in the army who were less than enthusiastic about Hitler. As Minister of Defense, Blomberg worked feverishly to expand the size and power of the army. In 1933 Blomberg was made a colonel-general for his services. In 1934, Blomberg encouraged Hitler to crack down on SA leader Ernst Röhm and his followers, who he believed posed a serious threat to the army. As such, he condoned and participated in the Night of the Long Knives.

In the same year, after the death of Reichspräsident Paul von Hindenburg, he personally ordered all soldiers in the army to pledge the Reichswehreid oath of allegiance not to Volk and Fatherland, but to the new Reichspräsident and Führer (Adolf Hitler). In 1935 the Ministry of Defense was renamed to Ministry of War; Blomberg became Minister of War and Commander-in-Chief of the Armed Forces. In 1936, Blomberg was the first General Field Marshal appointed by Hitler.

Blomberg's quick career surge alienated Hermann Göring and Heinrich Himmler, who conspired to oust Blomberg from power. After the Hossbach Memorandum meeting of November 1937, Hitler was dissatisfied with him. They struck in January 1938, when Blomberg, then 60, married Erna Gruhn (sometimes referred to as "Eva" or "Margarete"), a 26-year-old typist. A police officer discovered that Gruhn had been a prostitute with a criminal record and reported this to the Gestapo and Göring, who then informed Hitler, who ordered Blomberg to annul the marriage to avoid a scandal and preserve the integrity of the army. Blomberg refused to annul the marriage, and consequently resigned all of his posts on 27 January 1938 when Göring threatened to make his wife's past public knowledge. Several days later, Göring and Himmler accused Commander-in-Chief Werner von Fritsch of being a homosexual. Hitler used these opportunities for major reorganisation of the Wehrmacht. Von Fritsch was later acquitted, the events became known as Blomberg-Fritsch Affair.

Blomberg and his wife were subsequently exiled for a year to the isle of Capri. Spending World War II in obscurity, Blomberg was captured by the Allies in 1945, after which time he gave evidence at the Nuremberg Trials. Blomberg died while in detention at Nuremberg in 1946.

== Other family members ==
- Hugo von Blomberg

== Literature ==
- Selbständige Veröffentlichungen: (postum) Hinterlassene Poetische Schriften des Freiherrn Alexander von Blomberg. Mit der Lebensbeschreibung und dem Bildnis des Verfassers, auch einem Vorspiele von Freiherrn [Friedrich] de La Motte-Fouqué. Berlin: Maurer 1820. XVI, 315S. [Inhalt: Konrad in Deutschland. Vorspiel in einem Aufz.; Konrad in Welschland. Trauerspiel in 5 Aufz.; Waldemar von Dänemark, unvollendetes Schauspiel; Kleinere Gedichte] (Lipp. LB Detmold, StB Trier, StB Bielefeld) – Hinterlassene Gedichte. Berlin: Maurer 1819 – Die verhasste Wirklichkeit. Gedichte. Im Auftrag des Lipp. Heimatbundes hg. von H. Detering. Göttingen: Quo-Vadis-Verlag 1986. 47S.
- Unselbständige Veröffentlichungen in: Morgenbl. vom 20.5.1817: Schwertfegerlied. Briefe an Karl Alexander von Blomberg: von Friedrich de la Motte Fouqué: 24.3.1816, 10.11.1816 und 16.2.1817, in: Heinemann 1926 (s.u.), S. 91f.
- Literarische Zeugnisse: Pothmann: Westph. Taschenbuch 1815, S. 65-69: Der Tod fürs Vaterland – Georg Moritz von Blomberg: Alexander von Blomberg, das erste Opfer der Befreiungskriege. o.O. 1813 (Lipp. LB Detmold); Nachdr. Berlin: Tagesztg. 1913. 15S. (Lipp. LB Detmold) – Friedrich de la Motte Fouqué: Kosackenklage über Alexander von Blombergs Tod, in ders.: Gedichte, Bd. 2: Gedichte aus dem Manns-Alter, Stuttgart, Tübingen: Cotta 1817, S. 227f. (Grabbe-Archiv Detmold).
- Selbständige Veröffentlichungen über Karl Alexander von Blomberg: B. Heinemann: Wilhelm und Alexander von Blomberg. Zwei westfälische Dichter. Bad Driburg o.J. Diss. Münster 1926. 92S. (Lipp. LB Detmold).
- Unselbständige Veröffentlichungen über Karl Alexander von Blomberg: Alexander von Blomberg, in: Lipp. Landesztg. vom 9.2.1888 [anonym] (Lipp. LB Detmold) – J. Minn: Alexander von Blomberg 1788–1813. Ein westfälischer Sänger und Held aus den Freiheitskriegen, in: Dichterstimmen der Gegenwart 22, 1908, H. 2, S. 47-57 (Lipp. LB Detmold) – [...] Fritsch: Alexander von Blomberg, in: Mitt. zur lipp. Gesch. 8, 1910, S. 234-240 (Lipp. LB Detmold); ders.: Alexander Freiherr von Blomberg, in: Lipp. Landesztg. vom 30.9.1912 (Lipp. LB Detmold); ders.: Alexander Freiherr von Blomberg, in: Niedersachsen 17, 1911/1912, H. 1, S. 53ff. (StB Bielefeld) – E. Hammer: Zur Erinnerung an Alexander von Blomberg, in: Mitt. des Vereins für die Gesch. Berlins 1913 – [Lambrecht Karl]: Alexander Freiherr von Blomberg-Iggenhausen [1788–1813]. Dichter und Kämpfer in den Freiheitskriegen, in: Staercke 1936, S. 172-174 – A. Ebert: Alexander Blomberg zum Gedenken. Vor 150 Jahren in Iggenhausen bei Lage geboren, in: Lipp. Landesztg. 197, Nr. 40 vom 16.2.1963, S. 8 (Lipp. LB Detmold) – K. Wernicke: Wo Alexander von Blomberg fiel. Ein Berliner Denkmal an die deutsch-russische Waffenbrüderschaft von 1813, in: Neues Deutschland vom 27.3.1971, S. 15 (Lipp. LB Detmold) – H. Detering: Der Dichter Alexander von Blomberg, ein lippischer Schüler Fouqués, in: Lemgoer Hefte, Nr. 35, Dez. 1986–März 1987, S. 4–6.
- Nachlaß, Handschriftliches: 1. StA Bielefeld – 2. StLB Dortmund – 3. BFDH Frankfurt – 4. Privatbesitz Schloß Iggenhausen: Die Wette. Lustspiel in 1 Aufz. (1807) Der Ueberfall. Schauspiel in 2 Aufz. (1808); Lodowico. Ein Schauspiel (1810); Der Sommerabend in Berlin. Lustspiel in einem Akt (1810); Ged., Briefe.
- Nachschlagewerke: Hamberger/Meusel, 5. Aufl., Bd. 17, 1820 – Ersch/Gruber, Bd. 11, 1823; Bd. 22,1, 1829 – Raßmann 1826 – Wolff, Bd. 1, 1835 – ADB, Bd. 2, 1875 – Brümmer, Bd. 1, 1876 – Brümmer 1884 – Eckart 1891 – Kosch, 1. Aufl., Bd. 1, 1928; 3. Aufl., Bd. 1, 1968 – Goedeke, 2. Aufl., Bd. 7, 1904 – Lipp. Bibliogr., Bd. 1, 1957; Bd. 2, 1982 – Killy, Bd. 2, 1989 – Dt. Biogr. Archiv, Fiche 108, Sp. 401–404.
- Ein seltener fall von Hydrocephalus; Zeitschrift für die gesamte Neurologie und Psychiatrie. Publisher: Springer Berlin / Heidelberg. ISSN 0303-4194 - Issue Volume 24, Number 1 / December, 1914 - Pages 200–216.
