= Villars-le-Sec =

- Commune
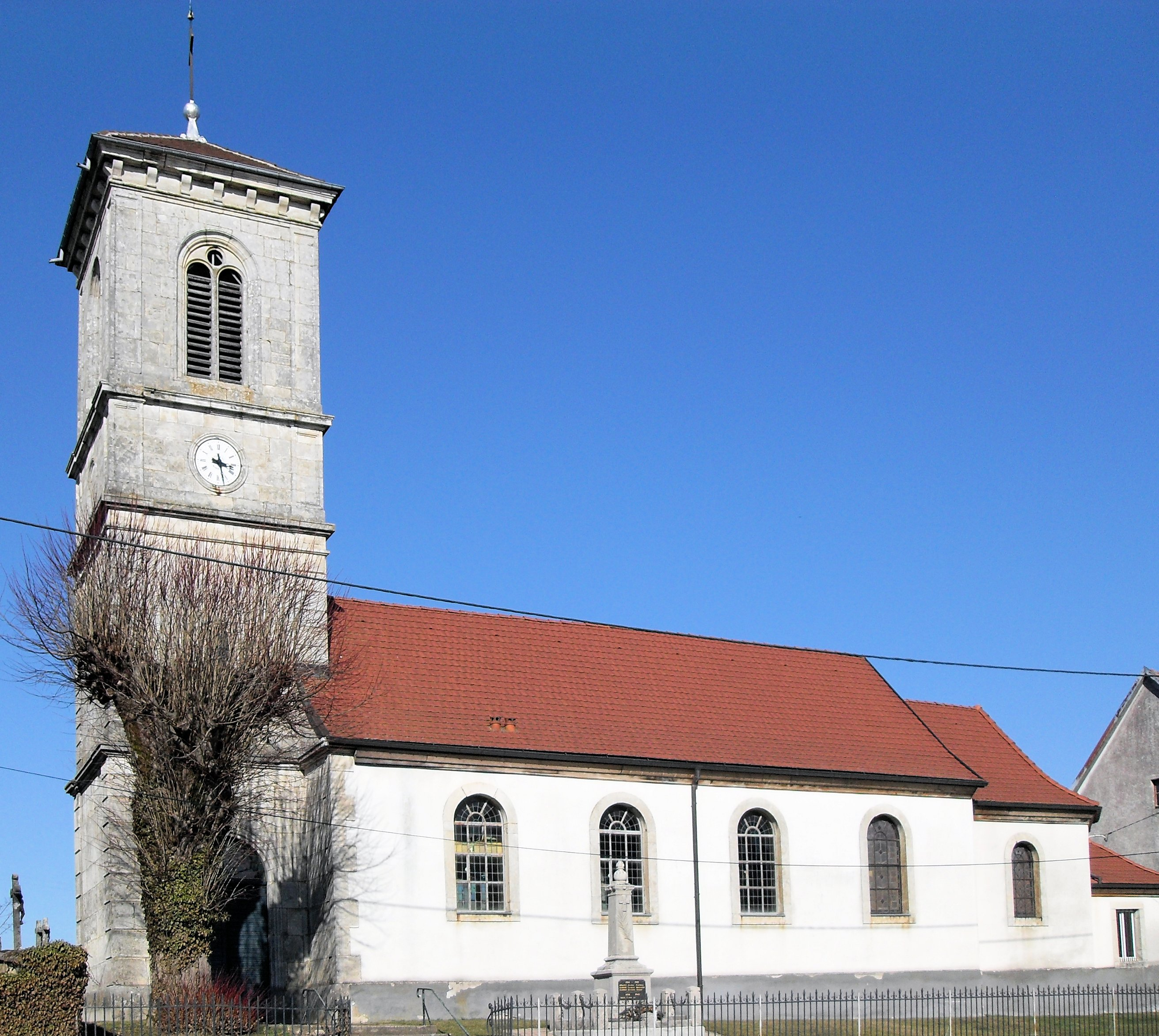
- The church of the Nativity of Our Lady

- Coat of arms
- Location of Villars-le-Sec
- Location within France Location within Bourgogne-Franche-Comté
- Coordinates: 47°27′18″N 6°59′29″E
- Country: France
- Region: Bourgogne-Franche-Comté
- Department: Territoire de Belfort
- Arrondissement: Belfort
- Canton: Delle
- Intercommunality: CC du Sud Territoire

Government
  - Mayor (2020–2026): Jean-Michel Talon
- Area^{1}: 3.05 km^{2} (1.18 sq mi)
- Highest elevation: 621 m (2,037 ft)
- Lowest elevation: 519 m (1,703 ft)
- Population (2023): 176
  - Density: 57.7/km^{2} (149/sq mi)
- Time zone: UTC+01:00 (CET)
  - Summer (DST): UTC+02:00 (CEST)
- INSEE/Postal code: 90105 /90100
- ^{1} French Land Register data, which excludes lakes, ponds, glaciers > 1 km^{2} (0.386 sq mi or 247 acres) and river estuaries.

Villars-le-Sec (French pronunciation: [vilaʁ lə sɛk]) is a commune in the Territoire de Belfort department in Bourgogne-Franche-Comté in northeastern France.

== Politics and administration ==
List of Mayors of Villars-le-Sec
Term		Mayor	Party
March 1971	March 2014	Jean-Louis Fridez	UMP
March 2014	May 2020	Laurent Brochet	Ind.
May 2020	Incumbent	Jean-Michel Talon	

== See also ==
- Communes of the Territoire de Belfort department
