= Carol Joyce Blumberg =

American statistician

Carol Joyce Blumberg (died 16 December 2023) was an American statistician whose professional interests included survey methodology, design of experiments, and statistics education.

== Education and career ==
Blumberg earned bachelor's and master's degrees from the University of Michigan in 1972 and 1974 respectively. She earned a second master's degree at Michigan State University in 1981, and completed her Ph.D. there in 1982.

Blumberg was a statistics professor at Winona State University from 1987 to 2006. After her retirement as a professor emerita at Winona State, she worked for the United States Department of Energy from 2006 to 2014.

She was program chair for the Educational Statistics Special Interest Group (SIG) of the American Educational Research Association in 1999–2000, and president of SIG in 2000–2001. She also led the International Statistical Literacy Project of the International Association for Statistical Education from 2001 to 2006.

== Recognition ==
Blumberg was chosen to become a Fellow of the American Statistical Association in 2010 "for notable contributions to statistics education at the national and international level; for outstanding teaching, advising and mentoring; for extensive service to the profession; and for contributions to the fields of educational statistics and energy statistics". She was also an elected member of the International Statistical Institute.
