= Lebetain =

- Commune
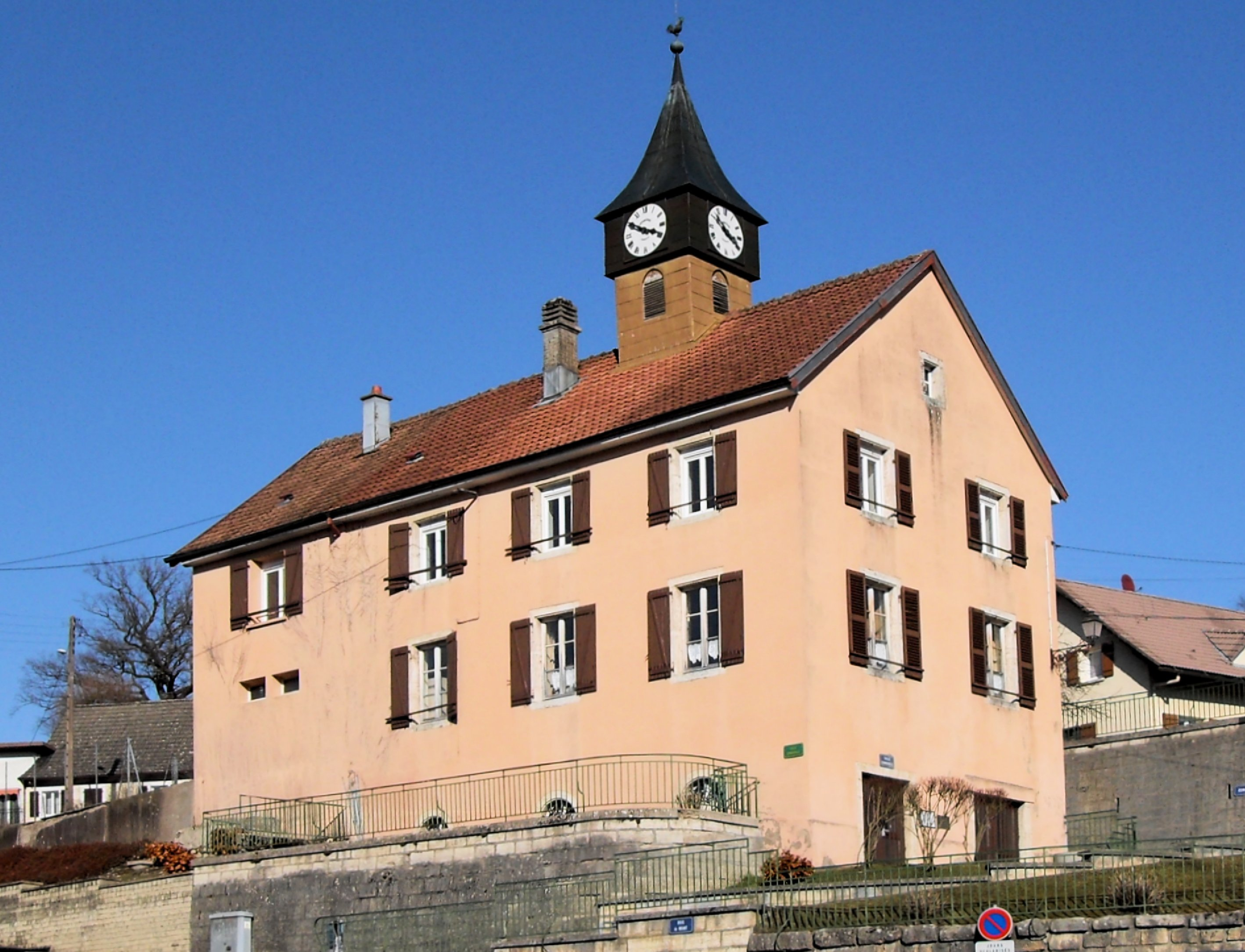
- Town hall

- Coat of arms
- Location of Lebetain
- Location within France Location within Bourgogne-Franche-Comté
- Coordinates: 47°29′16″N 6°58′40″E
- Country: France
- Region: Bourgogne-Franche-Comté
- Department: Territoire de Belfort
- Arrondissement: Belfort
- Canton: Delle
- Intercommunality: Sud Territoire

Government
  - Mayor (2020–2026): Jean-Jacques Duprez
- Area^{1}: 4.84 km^{2} (1.87 sq mi)
- Highest elevation: 507 m (1,663 ft)
- Lowest elevation: 380 m (1,250 ft)
- Population (2023): 422
  - Density: 87.2/km^{2} (226/sq mi)
- Time zone: UTC+01:00 (CET)
  - Summer (DST): UTC+02:00 (CEST)
- INSEE/Postal code: 90063 /90100
- ^{1} French Land Register data, which excludes lakes, ponds, glaciers > 1 km^{2} (0.386 sq mi or 247 acres) and river estuaries.

Lebetain (French pronunciation: [ləbətɛ̃]) is a commune in the Territoire de Belfort department in Bourgogne-Franche-Comté in northeastern France.

== See also ==
- Communes of the Territoire de Belfort department
