= Jaakko Blomberg =

Finnish diplomat (1942–2025)

Jaakko Pekka Blomberg (26 April 1942 – 3 December 2025) was a Finnish diplomat.

== Life and career ==
Blomberg was born in Helsinki on 26 April 1942. He studied philosophy and sociology at the University of Helsinki from 1962 to 1967 and at Brandeis University in the United States from 1968 to 1969. He graduated in Licentiate of Political Science from the University of Helsinki in 1970.

In the 1960s, Blomberg was active in the student union of Helsinki. He worked as a summer editor in the Social Democrats in 1965, as secretary in the Tilanne magazine in 1966, as editor in chief in the Foreign Policy magazine 1967–1968 and as editor of the Ajatus yearbook of the Finnish Philosophical Association 1969–1973.

Blomberg's first real job was in the National Union of University Students, where he served as Secretary of Culture from 1967 to 1968.

After returning from the United States, he served as Assistant to Practical Philosophy at the University of Helsinki from 1969 to 1972 and later as Assistant Professor of the Academy of Finland from 1972 to 1973.

After a few years working as a member of the Higher Education Council, he was appointed Head of Office of the Ministry of Education at the Ministry of Education and Science (Student Affairs Office) in 1973.

His career at the Ministry of Education was short when Blomberg moved to the Ministry for Foreign Affairs in 1974, where he worked until 2005 until his retirement.

He worked as head of office at the Ministry's Political Department from 1974 to 1976, as a negotiating officer for disarmament issues in 1977, deputy to the UN Representative for Finland in New York, 1978–1982, and Deputy Director General of the Ministry's Political Department 1982–85.

Blomberg was Ambassador in Canada from 1985 to 1988, after which he was Department Head of the Political Department of the Ministry 1988–1992 and Political Undersecretary Secretary for the years 1992–2001. Upon completion of his career, he served as Ambassador in Estonia from 2001 to 2005.

After retiring Blomberg served as Special Adviser to the European Commissioner Olli Rehn in the Cyprus question 2005–2007 and then appointed by the Prime Ministers of Finland and Estonia, as Clearing Officer for Developing Cooperation between Finland and Estonia (together with Gunnar Okk) 2007–2008.

Blomberg died on 3 December 2025, at the age of 83.
