= Faverois =

- Commune
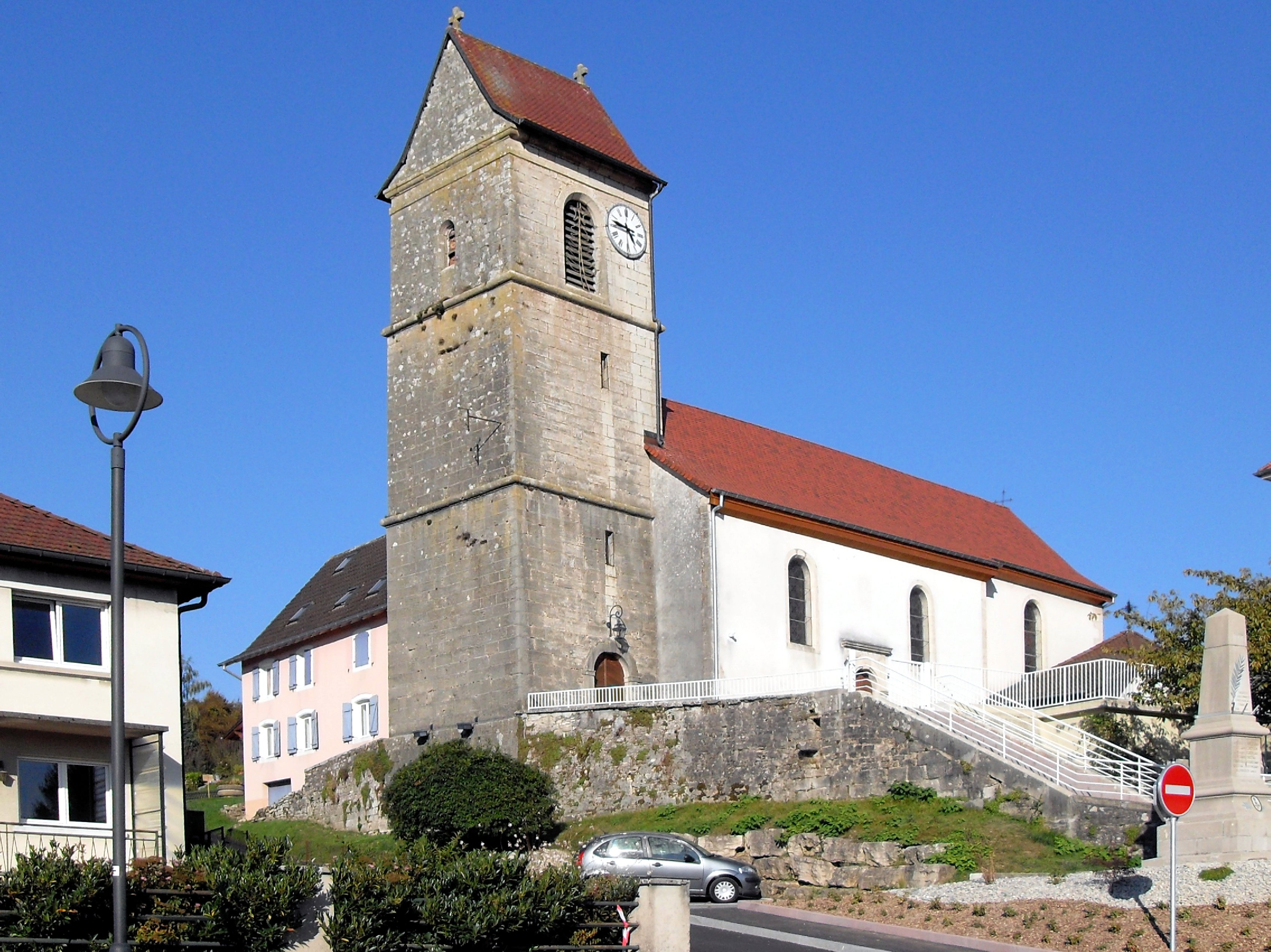
- Church and memorial

- Coat of arms
- Location of Faverois
- Location within France Location within Bourgogne-Franche-Comté
- Coordinates: 47°31′23″N 7°02′12″E
- Country: France
- Region: Bourgogne-Franche-Comté
- Department: Territoire de Belfort
- Arrondissement: Belfort
- Canton: Delle
- Intercommunality: Sud Territoire

Government
  - Mayor (2020–2026): Bernard Cerf
- Area^{1}: 6.50 km^{2} (2.51 sq mi)
- Highest elevation: 406 m (1,332 ft)
- Lowest elevation: 360 m (1,180 ft)
- Population (2023): 593
  - Density: 91.2/km^{2} (236/sq mi)
- Time zone: UTC+01:00 (CET)
  - Summer (DST): UTC+02:00 (CEST)
- INSEE/Postal code: 90043 /90100
- ^{1} French Land Register data, which excludes lakes, ponds, glaciers > 1 km^{2} (0.386 sq mi or 247 acres) and river estuaries.

Faverois (French pronunciation: [favʁwa]) is a commune in the Territoire de Belfort department in Bourgogne-Franche-Comté in northeastern France.

== See also ==
- Communes of the Territoire de Belfort department
