= Bloomberg Tradebook =

Bloomberg Tradebook, LLC. is a broker-dealer and a subsidiary of Bloomberg L.P.

== History ==
Bloomberg Tradebook was founded in 1996. Tradebook launched an FX marketplace in 2007.

In May 2020 the Securities and Exchange Commission filed settled charges against Tradebook LLC for misleading marketing surrounding how they handled trader orders.
