= Saint-Dizier-l'Évêque =

- Commune
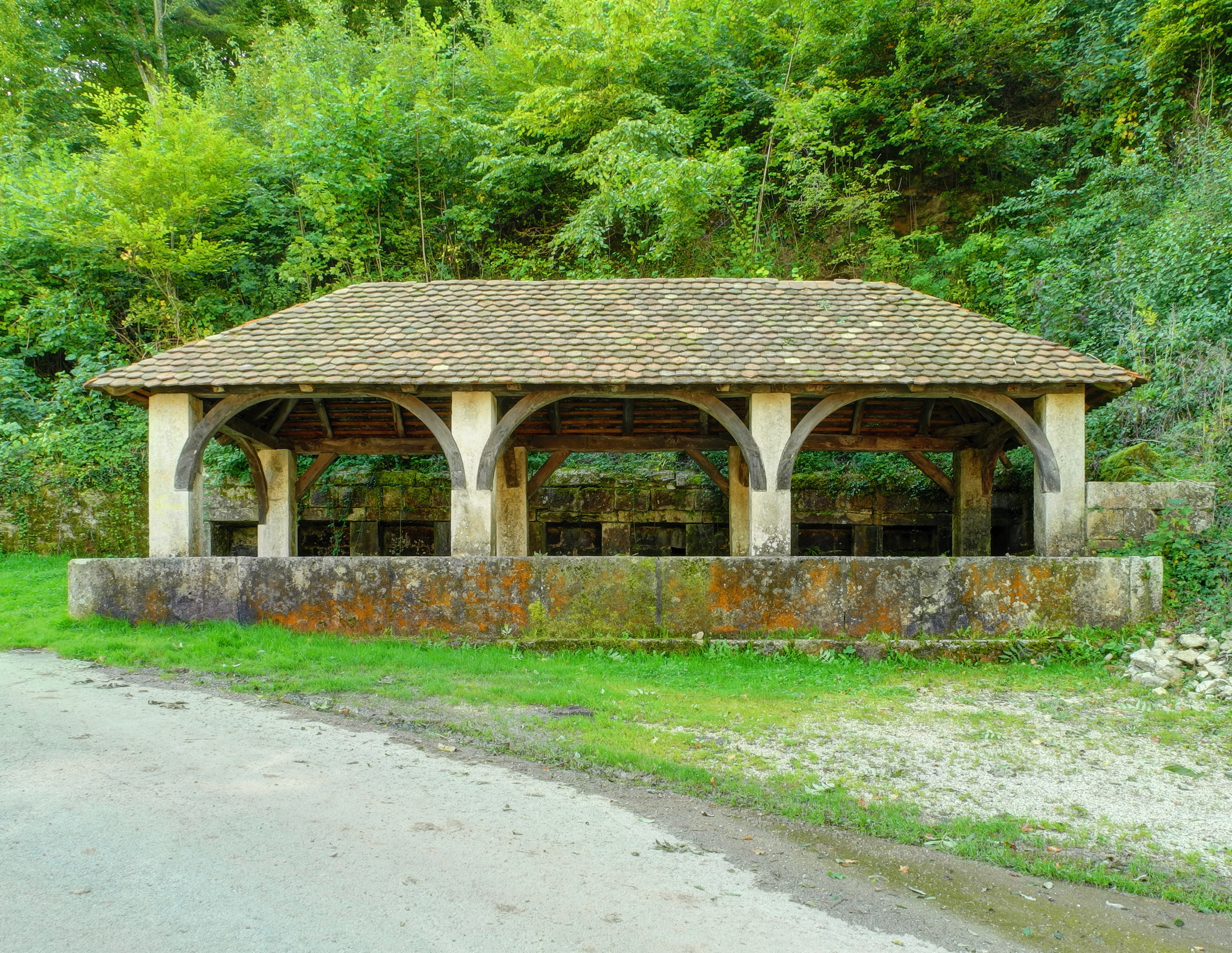
- Fountain and lavoir (Photo: Thomas Bresson)

- Coat of arms
- Location of Saint-Dizier-l'Évêque
- Location within France Location within Bourgogne-Franche-Comté
- Coordinates: 47°28′15″N 6°57′40″E
- Country: France
- Region: Bourgogne-Franche-Comté
- Department: Territoire de Belfort
- Arrondissement: Belfort
- Canton: Delle
- Intercommunality: Sud Territoire

Government
  - Mayor (2020–2026): Nicolas Peterlini
- Area^{1}: 10.83 km^{2} (4.18 sq mi)
- Highest elevation: 615 m (2,018 ft)
- Lowest elevation: 374 m (1,227 ft)
- Population (2023): 427
  - Density: 39.4/km^{2} (102/sq mi)
- Time zone: UTC+01:00 (CET)
  - Summer (DST): UTC+02:00 (CEST)
- INSEE/Postal code: 90090 /90100
- ^{1} French Land Register data, which excludes lakes, ponds, glaciers > 1 km^{2} (0.386 sq mi or 247 acres) and river estuaries.

Saint-Dizier-l'Évêque (French pronunciation: [sɛ̃ dizje levɛk]; German: Sankt Störingen) is a commune in the Territoire de Belfort department in Bourgogne-Franche-Comté in northeastern France.

== Geography ==
=== Climate ===
Saint-Dizier-l'Évêque has an oceanic climate (Köppen climate classification Cfb). The average annual temperature in Saint-Dizier-l'Évêque is 10.1 °C (50.2 °F). The average annual rainfall is 1,099.4 mm (43.28 in) with May as the wettest month. The temperatures are highest on average in July, at around 19.1 °C (66.4 °F), and lowest in January, at around 1.4 °C (34.5 °F). The highest temperature ever recorded in Saint-Dizier-l'Évêque was 37.0 °C (98.6 °F) on 13 August 2003; the coldest temperature ever recorded was −17.4 °C (0.7 °F) on 20 December 2009.

Climate data for Saint-Dizier-l'Évêque (1991–2020 averages, extremes 1991−present)
Month	Jan	Feb	Mar	Apr	May	Jun	Jul	Aug	Sep	Oct	Nov	Dec	Year
Record high °C (°F)	16.3 (61.3)	19.2 (66.6)	23.9 (75.0)	26.3 (79.3)	30.0 (86.0)	33.5 (92.3)	36.2 (97.2)	37.0 (98.6)	29.8 (85.6)	28.1 (82.6)	22.1 (71.8)	16.8 (62.2)	37.0 (98.6)
Mean daily maximum °C (°F)	3.9 (39.0)	5.4 (41.7)	9.6 (49.3)	13.9 (57.0)	17.9 (64.2)	21.7 (71.1)	23.7 (74.7)	23.5 (74.3)	18.8 (65.8)	13.7 (56.7)	8.0 (46.4)	4.8 (40.6)	13.7 (56.7)
Daily mean °C (°F)	1.4 (34.5)	2.4 (36.3)	5.9 (42.6)	9.6 (49.3)	13.5 (56.3)	17.2 (63.0)	19.1 (66.4)	19.0 (66.2)	14.8 (58.6)	10.5 (50.9)	5.4 (41.7)	2.4 (36.3)	10.1 (50.2)
Mean daily minimum °C (°F)	−1.0 (30.2)	−0.5 (31.1)	2.2 (36.0)	5.3 (41.5)	9.2 (48.6)	12.7 (54.9)	14.6 (58.3)	14.6 (58.3)	10.9 (51.6)	7.3 (45.1)	2.8 (37.0)	−0.1 (31.8)	6.5 (43.7)
Record low °C (°F)	−13.3 (8.1)	−16.5 (2.3)	−13.8 (7.2)	−5.1 (22.8)	−0.2 (31.6)	1.8 (35.2)	7.0 (44.6)	6.0 (42.8)	3.2 (37.8)	−6.3 (20.7)	−10.5 (13.1)	−17.4 (0.7)	−17.4 (0.7)
Average precipitation mm (inches)	75.9 (2.99)	71.7 (2.82)	77.0 (3.03)	81.3 (3.20)	111.6 (4.39)	100.0 (3.94)	92.7 (3.65)	99.1 (3.90)	89.1 (3.51)	102.1 (4.02)	97.6 (3.84)	101.3 (3.99)	1,099.4 (43.28)
Average precipitation days (≥ 1.0 mm)	11.8	10.8	10.9	10.7	13.6	10.9	10.8	10.7	9.6	12.1	11.9	13.5	137.2
Source: Météo-France

== See also ==
- Communes of the Territoire de Belfort department
