= Strengberg =

- Municipality
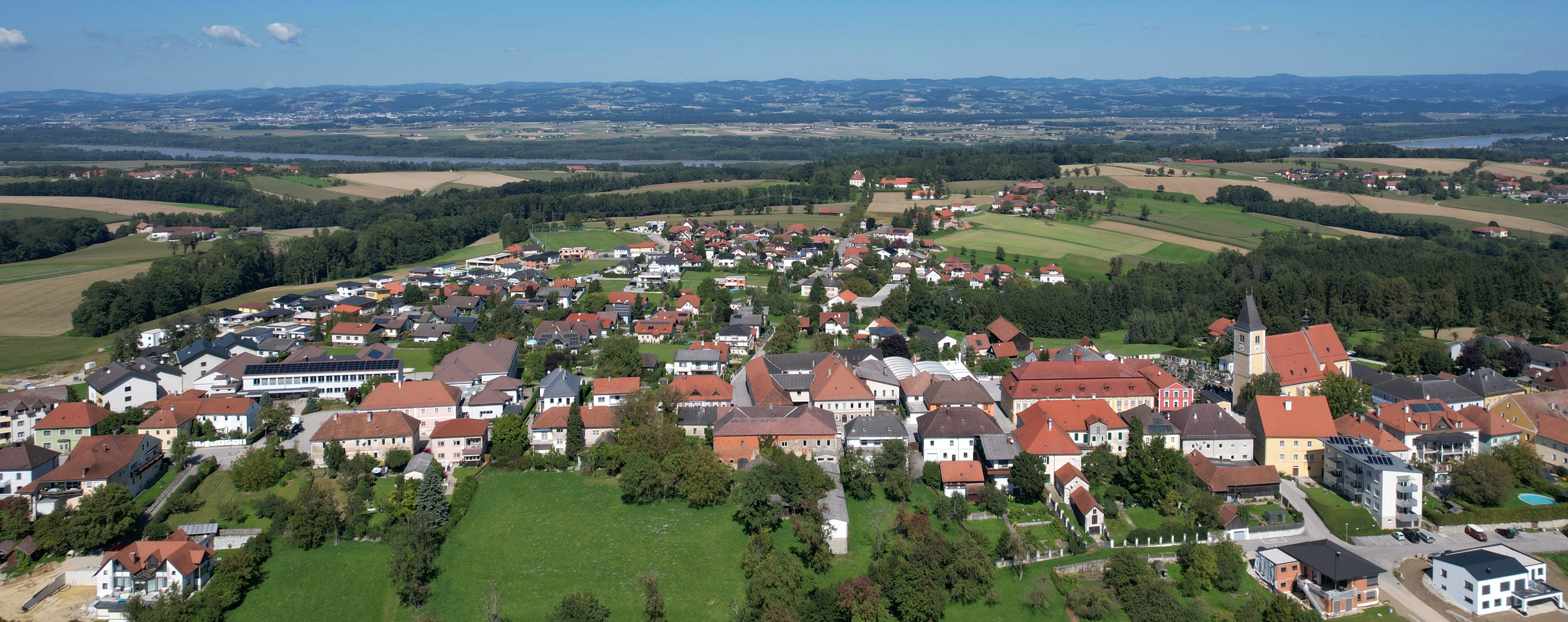
- Aerial view

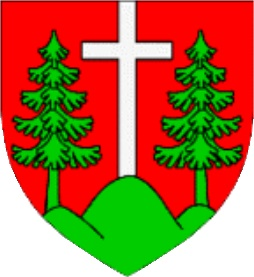
- Coat of arms

- Location within Austria
- Coordinates: 48°9′N 14°39′E
- Country: Austria
- State: Lower Austria
- District: Amstetten

Government
  - Mayor: Bruckner Johann

Area
  - Total: 36.81 km^{2} (14.21 sq mi)
- Elevation: 358 m (1,175 ft)

Population (2018-01-01)
  - Total: 2,055
  - Density: 55.83/km^{2} (144.6/sq mi)
- Time zone: UTC+1 (CET)
  - Summer (DST): UTC+2 (CEST)
- Postal code: 3314
- Area code: 07432
- Website: www.strengberg.at

Strengberg is a town in the district of Amstetten in Lower Austria in Austria.

== Geography ==
Strengberg lies in the Mostviertel in Lower Austria between Linz and Amstetten south of the Danube. About 17 percent of the municipality is forested.
