= Hugo von Blomberg =

German painter

August Gotthold Dietrich Hugo, Baron von Blomberg, a poet and painter, was born at Berlin in 1820. He studied under Karl Wilhelm Wach in the Academy at Berlin, and under Léon Cogniet at Paris, and copied Rubens's works in the Louvre. He died at Weimar in 1871. Among his paintings may be mentioned:

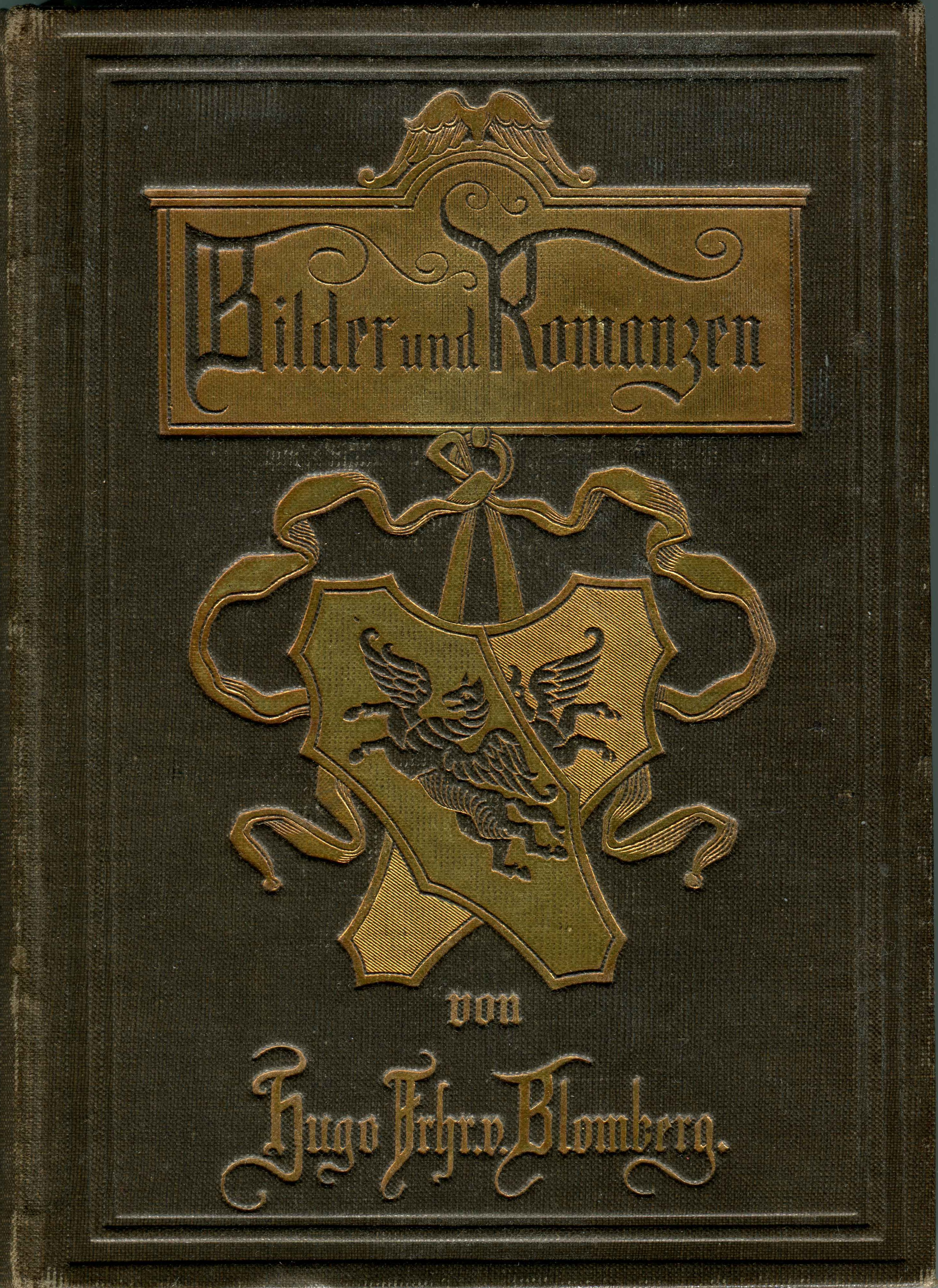
Book title of Blomberg's Images and Romances

- Das Domroschen. 1844.
- Neptune and Amymone. 1847.
- Twenty-seven sketches from Dante.
- A Town of the Middle-Ages.
- The Merchant of Venice. 1866.
- Benvenuto Cellini in Bngelsberg.
- King William at Koniggratz. 1867.

== Life ==
Von Blomberg initially worked as a lawyer, then devoted himself to painting in the wax studio in Berlin and in 1847 went to Paris to Léon Cogniet. Called back to arms service two years later, he continued his studies in Berlin until he decided in 1867 at the age of 47 to move to Weimar in order to improve himself under Ferdinand Pauwels leadership. His lively spirit, combined with a decided predilection for the ghostly, demonic and mystical, seldom allowed him to complete a work he had begun. But his 27 color sketches for Dante show a great talent for invention. The ornamental connection of his ideas was also to be emphasized, whereby his sense of color came in handy.

In Berlin, Blomberg became a member of the "Tunnel über der Spree", a literary society that had been founded on 3 December 1827, under the name "Der Sonntags-Verein zu Berlin" and which had an influence on Berlin's literary life for over 70 years. As a poet he made himself known through a volume of pictures and romances (Breslau 1860) and through his fatherland poems Treu zum Tod (Berlin 1872).

Among his publications on art history is the adaptation of the 3rd edition of Franz Kugler's History of Painting (Leipzig. 1867, 3 vols.). Blomberg and Kugler were both members of the Rütli, a subsidiary group from the "Tunnel über der Spree".

== See also ==
- List of German painters
