= List of cultural property of national significance in Switzerland: Jura =

This list contains all cultural property of national significance (class A) in the canton of Jura from the 2009 Swiss Inventory of Cultural Property of National and Regional Significance. It is sorted by municipality and contains 29 individual buildings, 6 collections and 11 archaeological finds.

The geographic coordinates provided are in the Swiss coordinate system as given in the Inventory.

== Alle ==
| KGS No.^{?} | Picture | Name | Street Address | CH1903 X coordinate | CH1903 Y coordinate | Location |
|---|---|---|---|---|---|---|
| 3446 | | Noir Bois; Paleolithic and Medieval Settlement | | 575.550 | 251.975 | 47.418128°N 7.114644°E |
| 3447 | | Pré Monsieur; Paleolithic Settlement | | 575.050 | 252.025 | 47.418559°N 7.108016°E |
| Unknown | | ISOS village urbanisé: Alle | | | | |

== Basse-Allaine ==
| KGS No.^{?} | Picture | Name | Street Address | CH1903 X coordinate | CH1903 Y coordinate | Location |
|---|---|---|---|---|---|---|
| 3474 | Prairie Dessous Gallo-Roman Villa | Prairie Dessous; Gallo-Roman Villa | Buix village | 568.920 | 259.340 | 47.484089°N 7.026278°E |
| 3550 | Former Priory of Grandgourt | Former Priory of Grandgourt | Montignez village | 570.529 | 257.868 | 47.470924°N 7.047722°E |
| Unknown | | ISOS village: Montignez | | | | |
| Unknown | | ISOS hameau: Le Maira | | | | |
| Unknown | | ISOS cas particulier: Grandgourt | | | | |

== Boncourt ==
| KGS No.^{?} | Picture | Name | Street Address | CH1903 X coordinate | CH1903 Y coordinate | Location |
|---|---|---|---|---|---|---|
| 10069 | Chavon-Dessous Farm House | Chavon-Dessous Farm House | Impasse Du Chavon-Dessous 1 | 567.927 | 260.741 | 47.496642°N 7.013002°E |

== Bourrignon ==
| KGS No.^{?} | Picture | Name | Street Address | CH1903 X coordinate | CH1903 Y coordinate | Location |
|---|---|---|---|---|---|---|
| Unknown | | ISOS village: Bourrignon | | | | |

== Clos du Doubs ==
| KGS No.^{?} | Picture | Name | Street Address | CH1903 X coordinate | CH1903 Y coordinate | Location |
|---|---|---|---|---|---|---|
| 10078 | | Farm House | Montmelon, Chez Danville 5 | 580.994 | 245.538 | 47.360412°N 7.187057°E |
| 3557 | Montvoie Castle | Montvoie Castle | Ocourt | 571.150 | 246.190 | 47.365919°N 7.056713°E |
| 3607 | Saint-Ursanne Collegiate church, Cloister and former Church of St-Pierre | Saint-Ursanne Collegiate church, Cloister and former Church of St-Pierre | | 578.460 | 246.030 | 47.36476°N 7.153491°E |
| 3618 | | Saint-Ursanne town fortifications | | 578.540 | 246.300 | 47.367191°N 7.154537°E |
| 3614 | Bridge over the Doubs | Bridge over the Doubs | Saint-Ursanne, Rue de 3 Février / Route du Clos du Doubs | 578.560 | 245.950 | 47.364043°N 7.154819°E |
| 9586 | Saint-Ursanne, Medieval Village | Saint-Ursanne, Medieval Village | | 578.500 | 246.000 | 47.364491°N 7.154022°E |
| Unknown | | ISOS petite Village / bourg: Saint-Ursanne | | | | |
| Unknown | | ISOS hameau: Montenol | | | | |

== Coeuve ==
| KGS No.^{?} | Picture | Name | Street Address | CH1903 X coordinate | CH1903 Y coordinate | Location |
|---|---|---|---|---|---|---|
| Unknown | | ISOS village: Coeuve | | | | |

== Cornol ==
| KGS No.^{?} | Picture | Name | Street Address | CH1903 X coordinate | CH1903 Y coordinate | Location |
|---|---|---|---|---|---|---|
| 3487 | | Mont-Terri, Prehistoric Site / Medieval Castle | | 579.050 | 248.970 | 47.391222°N 7.161164°E |

== Courgenay ==
| KGS No.^{?} | Picture | Name | Street Address | CH1903 X coordinate | CH1903 Y coordinate | Location |
|---|---|---|---|---|---|---|
| 9584 | Pierre-Percée, Neolithic Dolmen | Pierre-Percée, Neolithic Dolmen | | 575.850 | 250.630 | 47.406042°N 7.118692°E |

== Courrendlin ==
| KGS No.^{?} | Picture | Name | Street Address | CH1903 X coordinate | CH1903 Y coordinate | Location |
|---|---|---|---|---|---|---|
| Unknown | | ISOS cas particulier: Choindez | | | | |

== Courroux ==
| KGS No.^{?} | Picture | Name | Street Address | CH1903 X coordinate | CH1903 Y coordinate | Location |
|---|---|---|---|---|---|---|
| Unknown | | ISOS hameau: Courcelon | | | | |

== Delémont ==
| KGS No.^{?} | Picture | Name | Street Address | CH1903 X coordinate | CH1903 Y coordinate | Location |
|---|---|---|---|---|---|---|
| 3508 | Vorbourg Chapel | Vorbourg Chapel | Route Du Vorbourg 188 | 593.920 | 247.641 | 47.379573°N 7.358128°E |
| 3509 | Prince-Bishops' Castle | Prince-Bishops' Castle | Rue du 23-Juin 21–25 | 592.768 | 245.886 | 47.363777°N 7.342902°E |
| 3510 | St-Marcel Church | St-Marcel Church | Place de l‘Eglise 3 | 592.814 | 245.974 | 47.364569°N 7.34351°E |
| 3511; 8685 | Museum jurassien d’art et d’histoire et Tour Rouge | Museum jurassien d’art et d’histoire et Tour Rouge | 23-Juin No 52 | 592.700 | 245.961 | 47.36445°N 7.342001°E |
| 3527 | Rotunda for Locomotives, Carriage house | Rotunda for Locomotives, Carriage house | | 594.000 | 245.850 | 47.363465°N 7.359211°E |
| Unknown | | ISOS petite Village / bourg: Delémont | | | | |

== Fahy ==
| KGS No.^{?} | Picture | Name | Street Address | CH1903 X coordinate | CH1903 Y coordinate | Location |
|---|---|---|---|---|---|---|
| 10070 | Farm House | Farm House | Bout-Dessous 18 | 563.339 | 252.001 | 47.417796°N 6.952835°E |
| 10071 | House | House | Bout-Dessous 19 | 563.319 | 251.981 | 47.417615°N 6.952571°E |
| Unknown | | ISOS village: Fahy | | | | |

== Haute-Ajoie ==
| KGS No.^{?} | Picture | Name | Street Address | CH1903 X coordinate | CH1903 Y coordinate | Location |
|---|---|---|---|---|---|---|
| Unknown | | ISOS village: Chevenez | | | | |

== Haute-Sorne ==
| KGS No.^{?} | Picture | Name | Street Address | CH1903 X coordinate | CH1903 Y coordinate | Location |
|---|---|---|---|---|---|---|
| 3493 | St-Germain-D‘Auxerre Church | St-Germain-D‘Auxerre Church | Chemin Des Reus 1 | 588.227 | 242.590 | 47.334066°N 7.282876°E |
| 10072 | Farm House | Farm House | Au Village 17 | 582.135 | 242.447 | 47.332643°N 7.202283°E |
| 9585 | Le Mont, Prehistoric Shelter (Shared with Saint-Brais) | Le Mont, Prehistoric Shelter (Shared with Saint-Brais) | | 577.580 | 240.200 | 47.312293°N 7.142133°E |
| Unknown | | ISOS village: Soulce | | | | |
| Unknown | | ISOS cas particulier: Les Forges | | | | |

== La Baroche ==
| KGS No.^{?} | Picture | Name | Street Address | CH1903 X coordinate | CH1903 Y coordinate | Location |
|---|---|---|---|---|---|---|
| 3453 | Asuel, Castle Ruins / Abandoned Village | Asuel, Castle Ruins / Abandoned Village | | 582.740 | 249.840 | 47.399154°N 7.210003°E |
| 10077 | Farm House | Farm House | Miécourt, Grand-Rue 101 | 580.112 | 252.941 | 47.42697°N 7.175053°E |
| Unknown | | ISOS village: Miécourt | | | | |
| Unknown | | ISOS cas particulier: Pleujouse | | | | |

== La Chaux-des-Breuleux ==
| KGS No.^{?} | Picture | Name | Street Address | CH1903 X coordinate | CH1903 Y coordinate | Location |
|---|---|---|---|---|---|---|
| 10074 | Farm House 22 | Farm House 22 | | 568.957 | 230.009 | 47.220282°N 7.0288°E |
| Unknown | | ISOS hameau: La Chaux-des-Breuleux | | | | |

== Le Bémont ==
| KGS No.^{?} | Picture | Name | Street Address | CH1903 X coordinate | CH1903 Y coordinate | Location |
|---|---|---|---|---|---|---|
| 3457 | Farm House | Farm House | La Bosse No 38 | 568.200 | 235.500 | 47.269634°N 7.018418°E |
| Unknown | | ISOS hameau: La Bosse | | | | |

== Le Noirmont ==
| KGS No.^{?} | Picture | Name | Street Address | CH1903 X coordinate | CH1903 Y coordinate | Location |
|---|---|---|---|---|---|---|
| 3555 | Farm House | Farm House | Les Esserts 32 | 562.586 | 229.331 | 47.213854°N 6.944747°E |
| Unknown | | ISOS village urbanisé: Le Noirmont | | | | |

== Les Breuleux ==
| KGS No.^{?} | Picture | Name | Street Address | CH1903 X coordinate | CH1903 Y coordinate | Location |
|---|---|---|---|---|---|---|
| 3472 | Farm House | Farm House | Du Peu-Girard 46 A | 567.054 | 229.182 | 47.212751°N 7.003737°E |
| 10075 | Farm House | Farm House | Sur le Cratan 13 | 567.000 | 229.000 | 47.211111°N 7.003037°E |

== Les Genevez ==
| KGS No.^{?} | Picture | Name | Street Address | CH1903 X coordinate | CH1903 Y coordinate | Location |
|---|---|---|---|---|---|---|
| 10076 | Farm House 35 | Farm House 35 | | 576.600 | 233.900 | 47.255594°N 7.129501°E |
| 3539 | Rural Jurassien (Rural Jura Region) Museum | Rural Jurassien (Rural Jura Region) Museum | Les Clos dessus 10 | 576.809 | 234.293 | 47.259137°N 7.132242°E |

== Moutier ==
| KGS No.^{?} | Picture | Name | Street Address | CH1903 X coordinate | CH1903 Y coordinate | Location |
|---|---|---|---|---|---|---|
| 1072 | De Chalière Cemetery Chapel | De Chalière Cemetery Chapel | Rue Du Chalière 14 | 594.145 | 235.860 | 47.273612°N 7.361261°E |
| Unknown | | ISOS village urbanisé: Moutier | | | | |

== Muriaux ==
| KGS No.^{?} | Picture | Name | Street Address | CH1903 X coordinate | CH1903 Y coordinate | Location |
|---|---|---|---|---|---|---|
| Unknown | | ISOS village: Muriaux | | | | |

== Pleigne ==
| KGS No.^{?} | Picture | Name | Street Address | CH1903 X coordinate | CH1903 Y coordinate | Location |
|---|---|---|---|---|---|---|
| 3558 | Former Priory of Löwenburg | Former Priory of Löwenburg | Le Löwenburg 86 | 590.618 | 253.645 | 47.433536°N 7.314278°E |
| 3559 | | Löwenburg, Paleolithic Settlement and Neolithic Flint Mine | | 591.400 | 254.050 | 47.437189°N 7.324636°E |
| Unknown | | ISOS cas particulier: Löwenburg | | | | |

== Porrentruy ==
| KGS No.^{?} | Picture | Name | Street Address | CH1903 X coordinate | CH1903 Y coordinate | Location |
|---|---|---|---|---|---|---|
| 8784; 9334 | Archives of the Republic and Canton of Jura and the Jura cantonal library | Archives of the Republic and Canton of Jura and the Jura cantonal library | Rue Pierre-Péquignat 9 | 572.490 | 251.888 | 47.417225°N 7.074102°E |
| 3567 | Porrentruy Castle | Porrentruy Castle | | 572.363 | 252.140 | 47.419486°N 7.072403°E |
| 3568 | Church and College of the Jesuits | Church and College of the Jesuits | Place Blarer-de-Wartensee 2 | 572.609 | 251.556 | 47.414244°N 7.075699°E |
| 3569 | St-Pierre Church | St-Pierre Church | Rue de l‘Eglise 15 | 572.680 | 251.733 | 47.415839°N 7.076629°E |
| 3571; 8826 | Hôtel de Gléresse and the Foundation Archives of the former Bishopric of Basel | Hôtel de Gléresse and the Foundation Archives of the former Bishopric of Basel | Rue des Annonciades No 10 | 572.528 | 251.727 | 47.415779°N 7.074615°E |
| 3572; 8686 | Hôtel-Dieu with pharmacy and museum | Hôtel-Dieu with pharmacy and museum | Grand‘Rue 5 | 572.597 | 251.824 | 47.416654°N 7.075523°E |
| 8687 | Jura Natural Sciences Museum and Garden | Jura Natural Sciences Museum and Garden | Route de Fontenais 21 | 572.770 | 251.553 | 47.414224°N 7.077832°E |
| Unknown | | ISOS petite Village / bourg: Porrentruy | | | | |

== Rocourt ==
| KGS No.^{?} | Picture | Name | Street Address | CH1903 X coordinate | CH1903 Y coordinate | Location |
|---|---|---|---|---|---|---|
| Unknown | | ISOS village: Rocourt | | | | |

== Saignelégier ==
| KGS No.^{?} | Picture | Name | Street Address | CH1903 X coordinate | CH1903 Y coordinate | Location |
|---|---|---|---|---|---|---|
| Unknown | | ISOS village: Les Pommerats | | | | |
| Unknown | | ISOS hameau: Les Cerlatez | | | | |

== Saint-Brais ==
| KGS No.^{?} | Picture | Name | Street Address | CH1903 X coordinate | CH1903 Y coordinate | Location |
|---|---|---|---|---|---|---|
| 9585 | Le Mont, Prehistoric Settlement (Shared With Glovelier) | Le Mont, Prehistoric Settlement (Shared With Glovelier) | | 576.800 | 239.975 | 47.310243°N 7.13183°E |

== Val Terbi ==
| KGS No.^{?} | Picture | Name | Street Address | CH1903 X coordinate | CH1903 Y coordinate | Location |
|---|---|---|---|---|---|---|
| Unknown | | ISOS village: Corban | | | | |
