= Mont Terri =

Mountain in the Swiss Jura hosting the eponymous Rock Laboratory

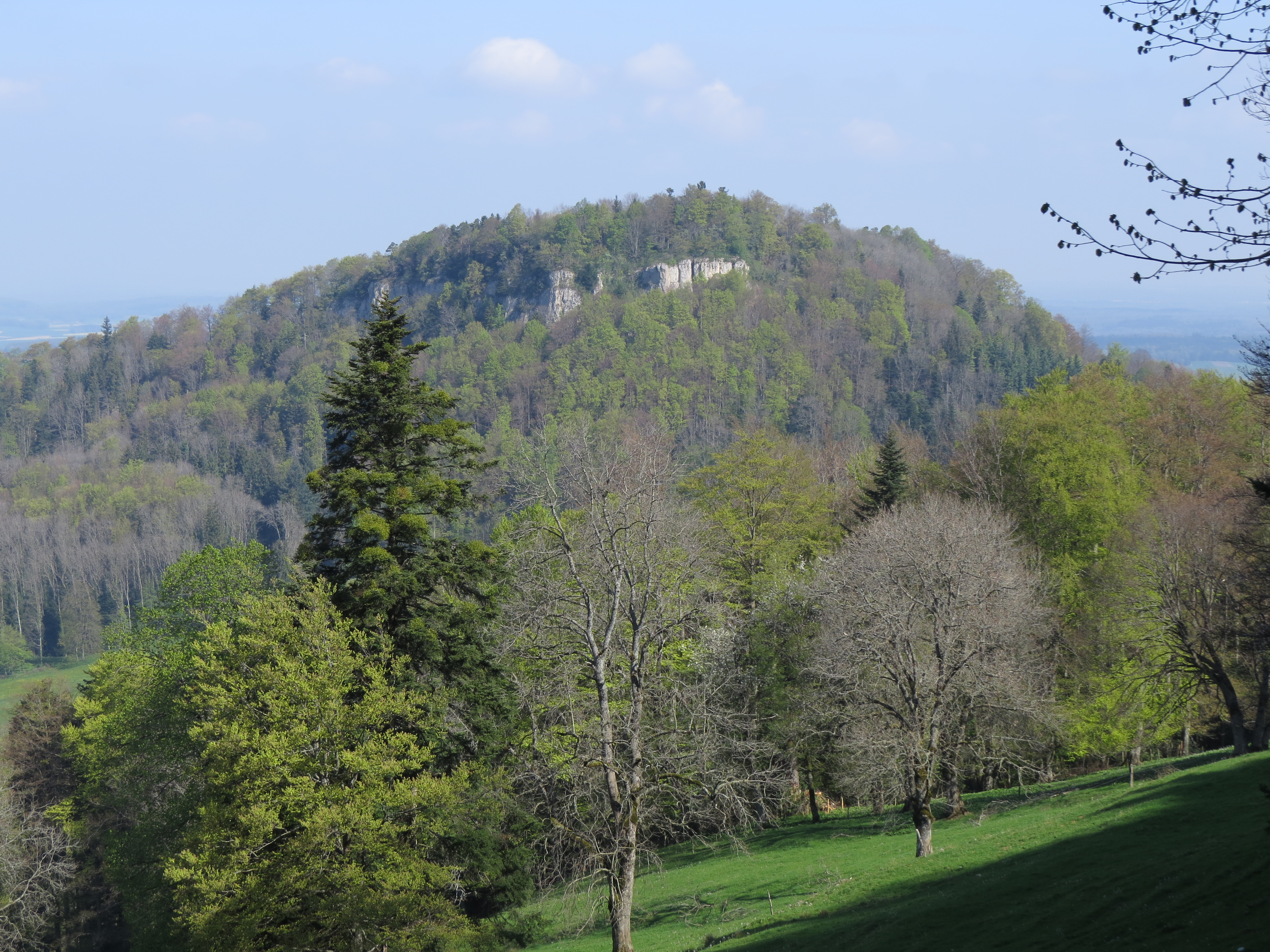

Highest point
- Elevation: 804 m (2,638 ft)
- Prominence: 108 m (354 ft)
- Parent peak: Montgremay
- Coordinates: 47°23′29″N 7°09′40″E

Geography
- Location within Switzerland
- Location: Jura, Switzerland
- Parent range: Jura Mountains

Mont Terri (804 metres; 2,638 ft) is one of the mountains of the Jura Mountains range. It is located south of Cornol in the Canton of Jura.

A prehistoric site, Mont-Terri Castle, is located on the summit.

== Geological structure ==
The Mont Terri has an anticline structure and is the northernmost anticline of the folded Jura. The sedimentary rock layers of Jurassic age dip 42° into the direction of SSE. The Mont Terri anticline hosts different tunnel infrastructures.

A limestone underground quarry was first exploited by room and pillar mining for the "Fabrique de chaux" of Saint Ursanne until the 1980s. The Mont Terri tunnel (4068 metres; 2½ miles length) was excavated and constructed between 1988 and 1998 for the Transjuranne A16 motorway. It consists of one single main tube hosting two circulation ways in opposite direction and one security gallery for emergency interventions and escape route in case of fire. The security gallery of smaller diameter was first excavated and served as reconnaissance gallery (pilot gallery) during the construction works. It intersects the Opalinus Clay Formation, a Jurassic argillaceous formation.

With the Mont Russelin tunnel, it makes possible to cross the last chain of the folded Jura (Les Rangiers) from the Swiss Plateau to reach the Ajoie region. The Mont Terri tunnel directly connects the near localities of Saint Ursanne (SSE) and Courgenay (NNW) and the cities of Delémont and Porrentruy.

In 1995, it was decided to construct the Mont Terri Rock Laboratory from the security gallery. It started with the excavation of small niches in the security gallery in 1996. The Mont Terri Rock Laboratory was then further extended in different excavation phases every 10 years: gallery 1998, gallery 2008, and finally gallery 2018.

== Underground Research Rock Laboratory ==
The mountain is the site of an international research project, the Mont Terri Project, founded in 1996. The facilities consist of the underground Mont Terri Rock Laboratory conducting research on geological, hydrogeological, geochemical and geotechnical characterisation of Opalinus Clay, a 130 m thick and watertight argillaceous claystone deposited 174 million years ago during the Aalenian (Middle Jurassic epoch).

The research team includes 23 partners from Switzerland, Europe, Japan, Canada, and USA, also associated with different research organizations in their respective countries. The purpose of the studies is to characterize the properties of this deep clay formation, to develop new methods and to test on site characterization techniques to understand thermal, hydraulical, mechanical (THM) and biochemical processes important for warranting the long-term safety of the geological disposal of highly radioactive waste (HLW) and spent nuclear fuel (SF).

In the recent years, the scope of the researches conducted at the Mont Terri Rock Laboratory has been widen to also include other scientific activities dealing with the deep underground such as seismology, carbon capture and storage (CCS), and the deep geothermy.

By convention with the Republic and Canton of Jura, it is excluded to use the Mont Terri site to dispose radioactive waste. The project aims to share information and knowledge between Mont Terri partners and to prepare the deep geological disposal in Opalinus Clay at greater depth (−600 to −700 metres; −2,000 to −2,300 ft) in the north of Switzerland in the area of Zurich in the decades to come.

The Mont Terri project is funded by Nagra (Swiss nuclear waste management organisation), ENSI (Swiss Federal Nuclear Safety Inspectorate), Swisstopo (Swiss geological survey), and all the Mont Terri partners (research institutes, nuclear waste management organisations, and safety authorities).

== See also ==
- Bedretto Underground Laboratory for Geoenergies (ETH Zurich)
- Damassine (local liqueur)
- Grimsel Pass, and the Grimsel Test Site (GTS, Rock Laboratory in granite)
- Grimsel Tunnel
- HADES Underground Research Laboratory (SCK CEN, Mol, BE)
- Meuse/Haute Marne Underground Research Laboratory
- Mont Terri Tunnel
- A16 motorway (Switzerland) (Transjuranne way)
- Saint-Ursanne
