= Montgremay =

Mountain in Switzerland

- Location within Switzerland

Highest point
- Elevation: 940 m (3,080 ft)
- Prominence: 141 m (463 ft)
- Parent peak: Les Ordons
- Coordinates: 47°23′21″N 7°11′09″E

Geography
- Location: Jura, Switzerland
- Parent range: Jura Mountains

Montgremay (940 m) is a mountain of the Jura, located south Cornol in the canton of Jura. It is one of the highest summits of the region of Ajoie.
