= Levoncourt =

Levoncourt may refer to the following places in France:

- Levoncourt, Meuse, a commune in the Meuse department
- Levoncourt, Haut-Rhin, a commune in the Haut-Rhin department
