= Miécourt =

- Former municipality
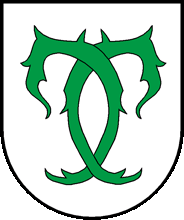
- Coat of arms
- Location of Miécourt
- Location within Switzerland Location within Canton of Jura
- Coordinates: 47°26′N 07°10′E
- Country: Switzerland
- Canton: Jura
- District: Porrentruy

Area
  - Total: 6.46 km^{2} (2.49 sq mi)
- Elevation: 479 m (1,572 ft)

Population (2003)
  - Total: 447
  - Density: 69.2/km^{2} (179/sq mi)
- Time zone: UTC+01:00 (CET)
  - Summer (DST): UTC+02:00 (CEST)
- Postal code: 2946
- SFOS number: 824
- ISO 3166 code: CH-JU
- Surrounded by: Vendlincourt, Alle, Cornol, Fregiécourt, Charmoille, Levoncourt(F)
- Website: SFSO statistics

Miécourt (French pronunciation: [mjekuʁ]) is a village and a former municipality in the district of Porrentruy in the canton of Jura in Switzerland. Since 2009 it is a part of the new municipality La Baroche.
