= Charmoille, Switzerland =

Charmoille
- Former municipality
- Location of Charmoille
- Location within Switzerland Location within Canton of Jura
- Coordinates: 47°25′N 07°12′E
- Country: Switzerland
- Canton: Jura
- District: Porrentruy

Area
  - Total: 9.2 km^{2} (3.6 sq mi)
- Elevation: 515 m (1,690 ft)

Population (2003)
  - Total: 340
  - Density: 37/km^{2} (96/sq mi)
- Time zone: UTC+01:00 (CET)
  - Summer (DST): UTC+02:00 (CEST)
- Postal code: 2947
- SFOS number: 6779
- ISO 3166 code: CH-JU
- Surrounded by: Pleigne, Pleujouse, Fregiécourt, Miécourt, Levoncourt(F), Oberlarg(F), Lucelle(F)
- Website: SFSO statistics

Charmoille is a village and a former municipality in the district of Porrentruy in the canton of Jura in Switzerland. On 1 January 2009 it became part of the new municipality of La Baroche.

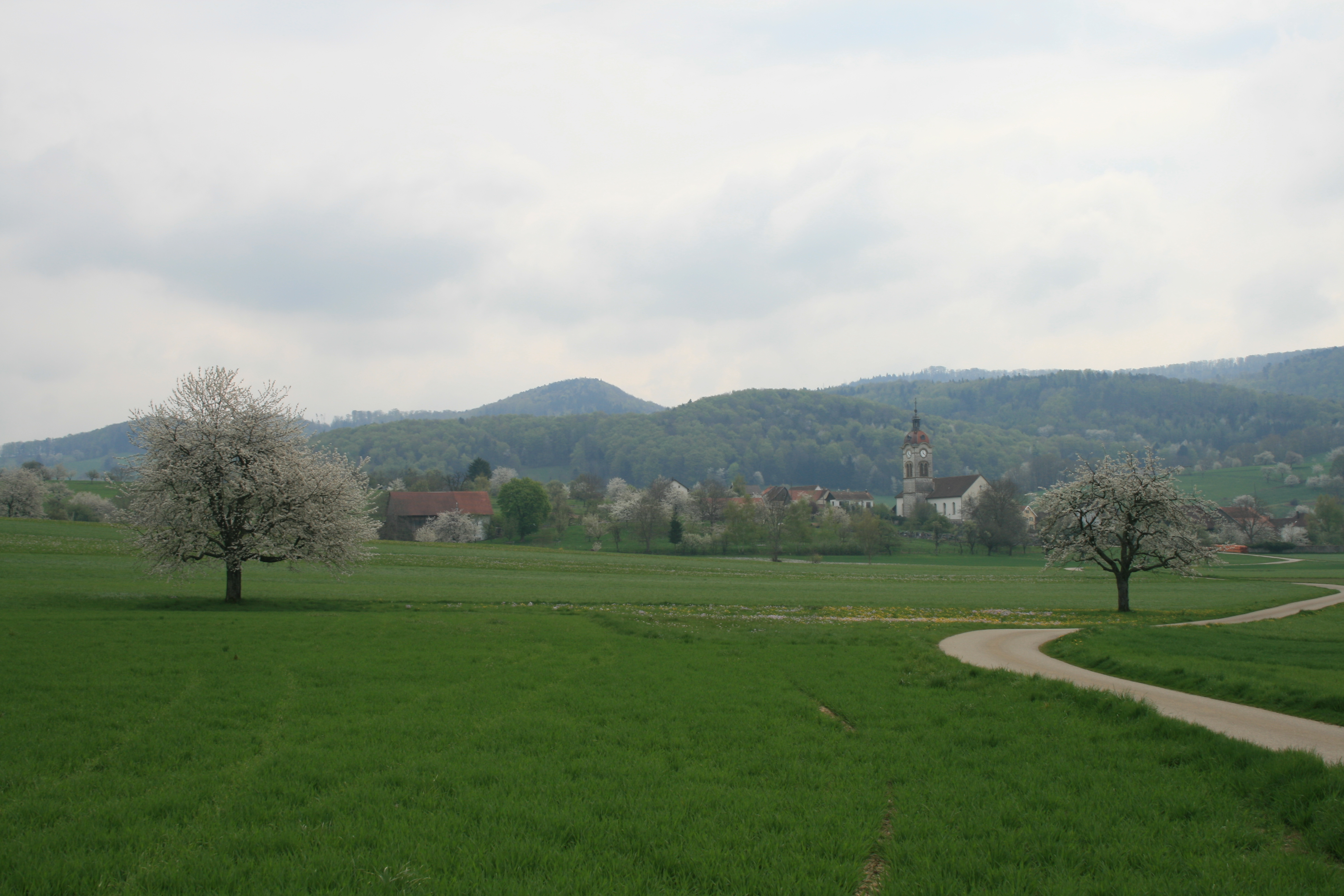
Charmoille JU
