= Mont-Terri Castle =

Castle ruin in Cornol, Switzerland

Coordinates: 47°23′28″N 7°09′40″E

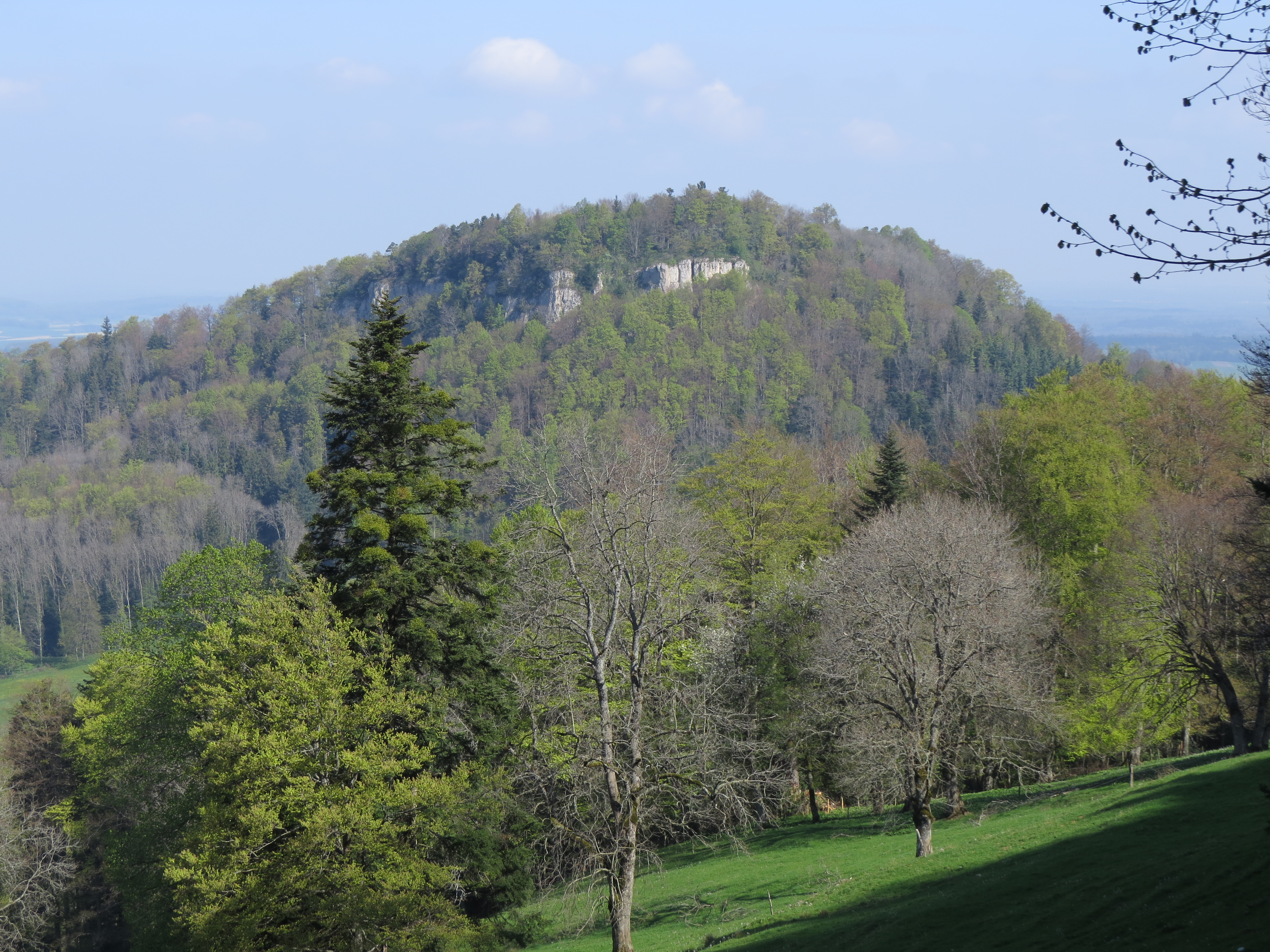
Mont Terri showing the natural cliffs which protect the western side of the summit plateau.

Mont-Terri Castle is a ruined medieval castle above a prehistoric hillfort on Mont Terri, located in the municipality of Cornol of the Canton of Jura in Switzerland. It is a Swiss heritage site of national significance.

== Description ==
Mont Terri forms a buttress of the Lomont ridge (part of the Jura Mountains), and is separated from it by a saddle called Derrière Mont Terri. The wooded summit forms a plateau four hectares (ten acres) in area. It is bounded on the west and southwest sides by steep cliffs, the remaining sides are protected by an ancient rampart. At the highest point of the plateau are the remains of a medieval fortified tower.

== History ==
The summit of Mont Terri is known locally as "Julius Caesar's Camp" (French language: Camp de Jules César); however, the earliest traces of habitation are from the Neolithic era. Pottery finds suggests that there was occupation during the Middle and Late Bronze Age. During the 1st century BC, a rampart was built of typical Gallic construction, a Murus Gallicus; it has been associated with the Gallic Wars, but the only firm dating for the site is a later Roman coin from the reign of Augustus. There are also finds from a further period of occupation in the 4th century AD and other finds extend into the 10th century. A stone tower was built on the site in the 13th century, probably replacing a previous wooden one, and is probably the "Château Thierry" mentioned in contemporary texts.

== Archaeological investigations ==
The first investigation of the site was by an antiquarian and Jesuit priest, Father Pierre-Joseph Dunod, at the start of the 18th century. Writing in 1716, Father Dunod speculated that the site was the scene of a decisive battle between Caesar and the Suebi tribe led by Ariovistus. There were later excavations by the owners of the site, Koeckler and Maupassant, who were found to have planted antiquities that they had purchased elsewhere, the deception being uncovered in 1862 by archaeologist Auguste Quiquerez (1801-1882). In the 20th century, methodical excavations by Alban Gerster (1898-1986) and in 1984 by a team from the University of Basle, have uncovered a range of finds from Neolithic flint arrow heads to a 10th-century dinarius coin from the reign of Louis IV of France.

== See also ==
- List of castles in Switzerland
