= Les Ordons =

Mountain in Switzerland

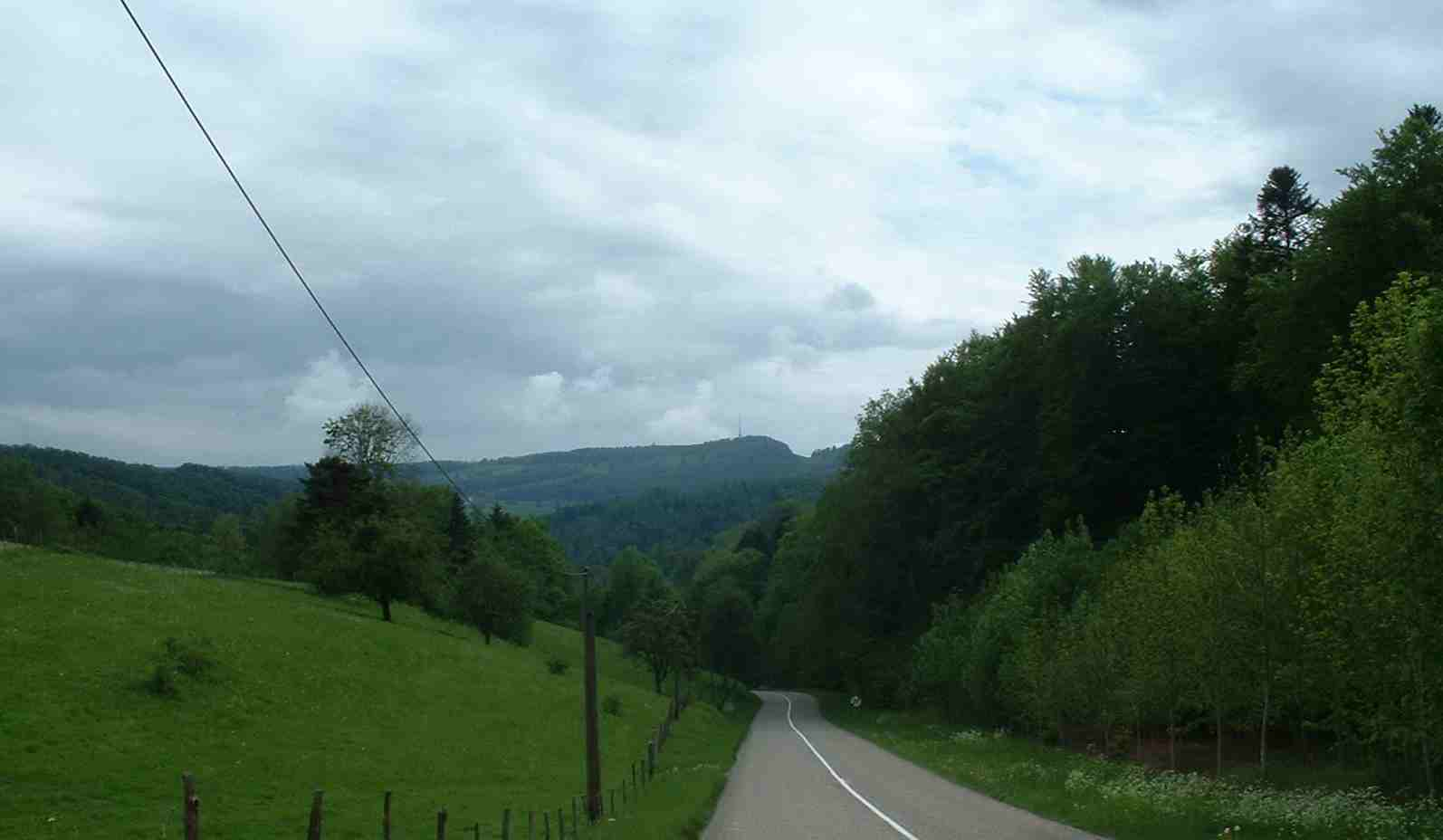
- Les Ordons (background) from the north side

Highest point
- Elevation: 995 m (3,264 ft)
- Prominence: 214 m (702 ft)
- Parent peak: Mont Soleil
- Coordinates: 47°23′16″N 7°13′53″E

Geography
- Location within Switzerland
- Location: Jura, Switzerland
- Parent range: Jura Mountains

Les Ordons (995 m) is a mountain of the Jura, located north-east of the Col des Rangiers in the canton of Jura. It houses the Les Ordons Transmission Tower.
