= Fregiécourt =

- Former municipality
- Location of Fregiécourt
- Location within Switzerland Location within Canton of Jura
- Coordinates: 47°25′N 07°12′E
- Country: Switzerland
- Canton: Jura
- District: Porrentruy

Area
  - Total: 3.48 km^{2} (1.34 sq mi)
- Elevation: 526 m (1,726 ft)

Population (2003)
  - Total: 133
  - Density: 38.2/km^{2} (99.0/sq mi)
- Time zone: UTC+01:00 (CET)
  - Summer (DST): UTC+02:00 (CEST)
- Postal code: 2953
- SFOS number: 6791
- ISO 3166 code: CH-JU
- Surrounded by: Cornol, Miécourt, Charmoille, Pleujouse, Asuel
- Website: SFSO statistics

Fregiécourt is a village and a former municipality in the district of Porrentruy in the canton of Jura in Switzerland. Since January 1, 2009 it is a part of the new municipality La Baroche.

Aerial view (1950)
