= La Baroche =

- Municipality
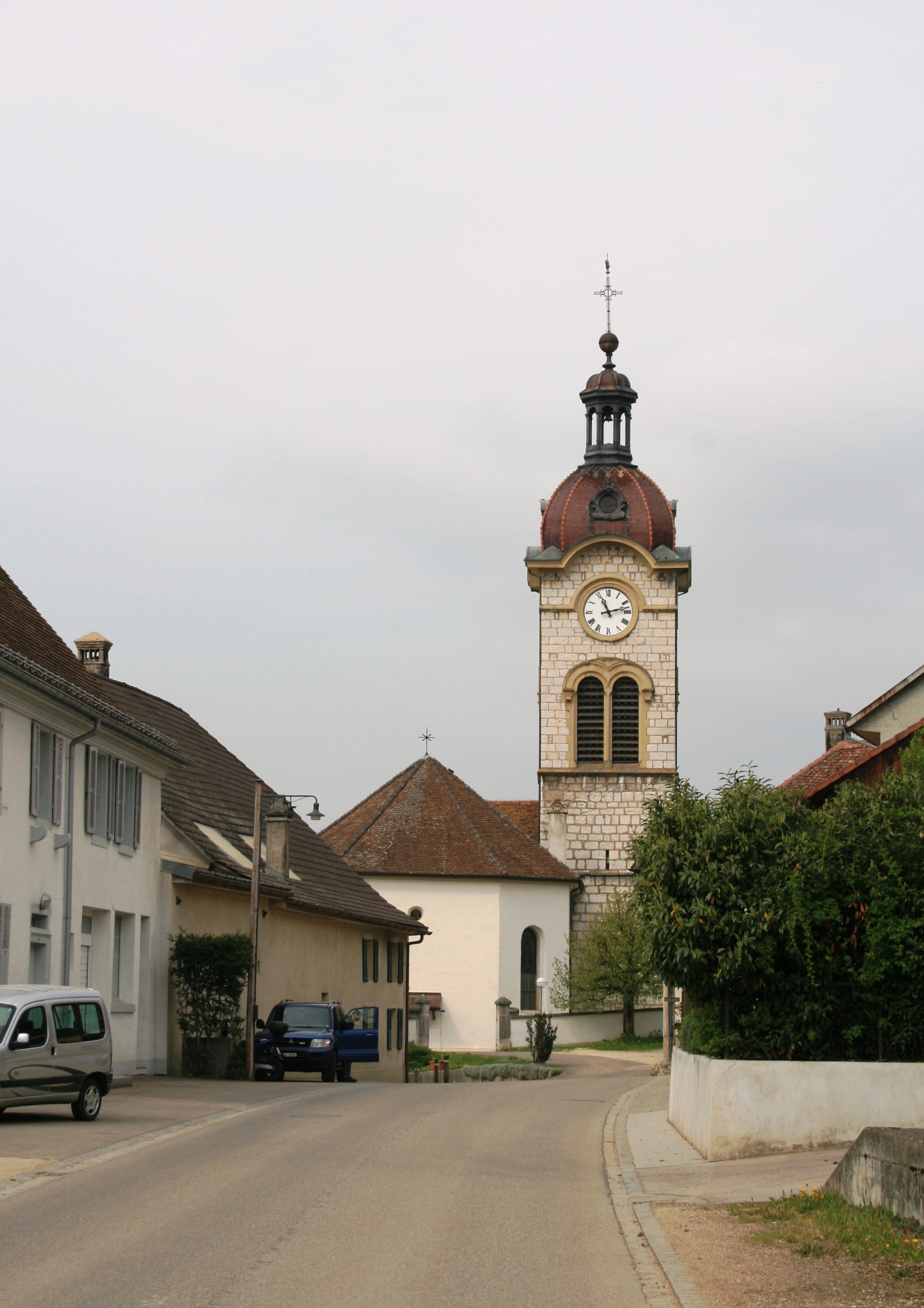
- Charmoille village church in La Baroche

- Coat of arms
- Location of La Baroche
- Location within Switzerland Location within Canton of Jura
- Coordinates: 47°25′N 07°10′E
- Country: Switzerland
- Canton: Jura
- District: Porrentruy

Government
  - Executive: Conseil communal with 7 members
  - Mayor: Maire; Romain Schaer SVP/UDC (as of 2026)

Area
  - Total: 31.1 km^{2} (12.0 sq mi)
- Elevation: 479 m (1,572 ft)

Population (2000)
  - Total: 1,194
  - Density: 38.4/km^{2} (99.4/sq mi)
- Time zone: UTC+01:00 (CET)
  - Summer (DST): UTC+02:00 (CEST)
- Postal code: 2946
- SFOS number: 6810
- ISO 3166 code: CH-JU
- Localities: Asuel, Charmoille, Fregiécourt, Miécourt, Pleujouse
- Website: baroche.ch

La Baroche (French pronunciation: [la baʁɔʃ]) is a municipality in the district of Porrentruy in the canton of Jura in Switzerland. It was founded at January 1, 2009 by the former municipalities of Asuel, Charmoille, Fregiécourt, Miécourt and Pleujouse.

== History ==
Asuel is first mentioned in 1136 as Asuel. Charmoille is first mentioned in 1136 as Calmillis. Fregiécourt is first mentioned in 1136 as Frigiscurth. Miécourt is first mentioned in 866 as Curtem que Mietiam. Pleujouse is first mentioned in 1105 as de Pluiusa.

== Geography ==
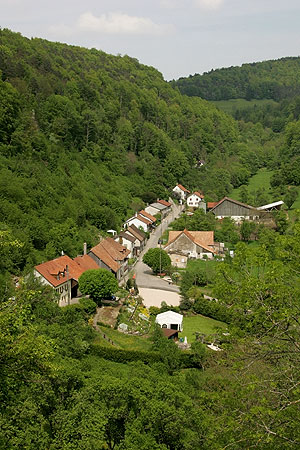
Pleujouse village

Aerial view, from front to back: Pleujouse, Fregiécourt, Miécourt (1950)

La Baroche has an area of 31.07 km^{2} (12.00 sq mi). Of this area, 15.24 km^{2} (5.88 mi^{2}) or 49.1% is used for agricultural purposes, while 14.18 km^{2} (5.47 mi^{2}) or 45.6% is forested. Of the rest of the land, 1.54 km^{2} (0.59 mi^{2}) or 5.0% is settled (buildings or roads), 0.09 km^{2} (22 acres) or 0.3% is either rivers or lakes and 0.06 km^{2} (15 acres) or 0.2% is unproductive land.

Of the built up area, housing and buildings made up 2.4% and transportation infrastructure made up 1.4%. Out of the forested land, 43.5% of the total land area is heavily forested and 2.1% is covered with orchards or small clusters of trees. Of the agricultural land, 22.3% is used for growing crops and 21.6% is pastures, while 2.3% is used for orchards or vine crops and 2.8% is used for alpine pastures. All the water in the municipality is flowing water.

== Demographics ==
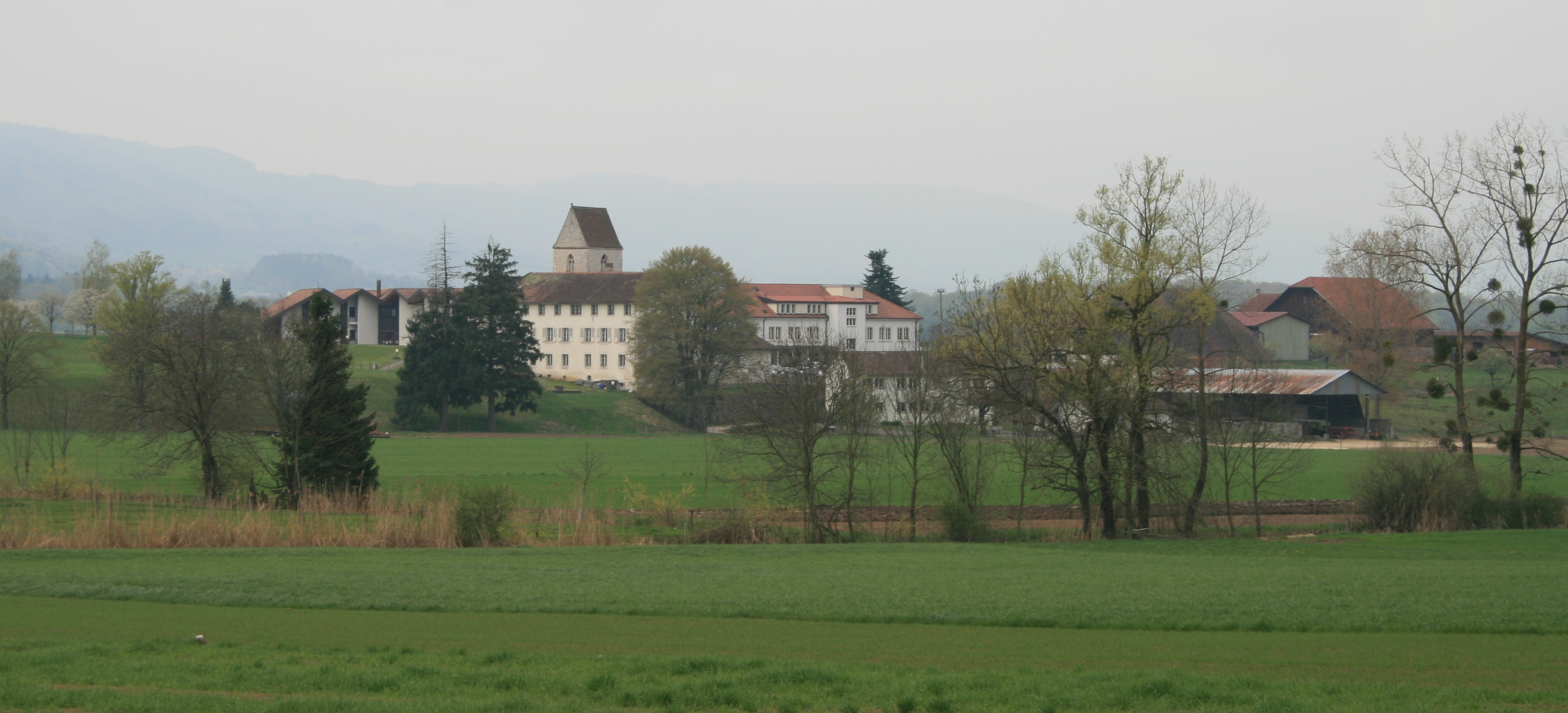
Miserez hamlet in La Baroche

La Baroche has a population (as of December 2020) of 1,135. As of 2010, 5.8% of the population are resident foreign nationals. Over the last 10 years (2000–2010) the population has changed at a rate of -2.9%. Migration accounted for -2.5%, while births and deaths accounted for -0.3%.

Most of the population (as of 2000) speaks French (90.2%) as their first language, German is the second most common (8.1%) and Italian is the third (0.8%).

As of 2008, the population was 48.9% male and 51.1% female. The population was made up of 550 Swiss men (46.1% of the population) and 33 (2.8%) non-Swiss men. There were 573 Swiss women (48.1%) and 36 (3.0%) non-Swiss women. As of 2000, children and teenagers (0–19 years old) make up 23.3% of the population, while adults (20–64 years old) make up 54.7% and seniors (over 64 years old) make up 22%.

As of 2009, the construction rate of new housing units was 1.7 new units per 1000 residents. The vacancy rate for the municipality, in 2010, was 0.51%.

== Historic Population ==
The historical population is given in the following chart:

== Heritage sites of national significance ==
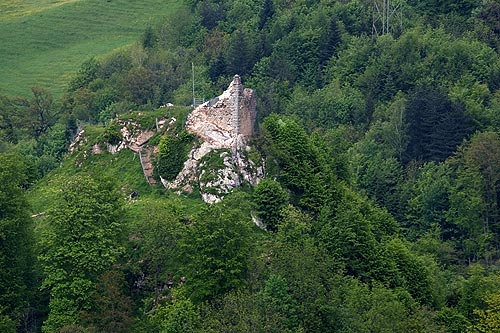
Asuel Castle Ruins

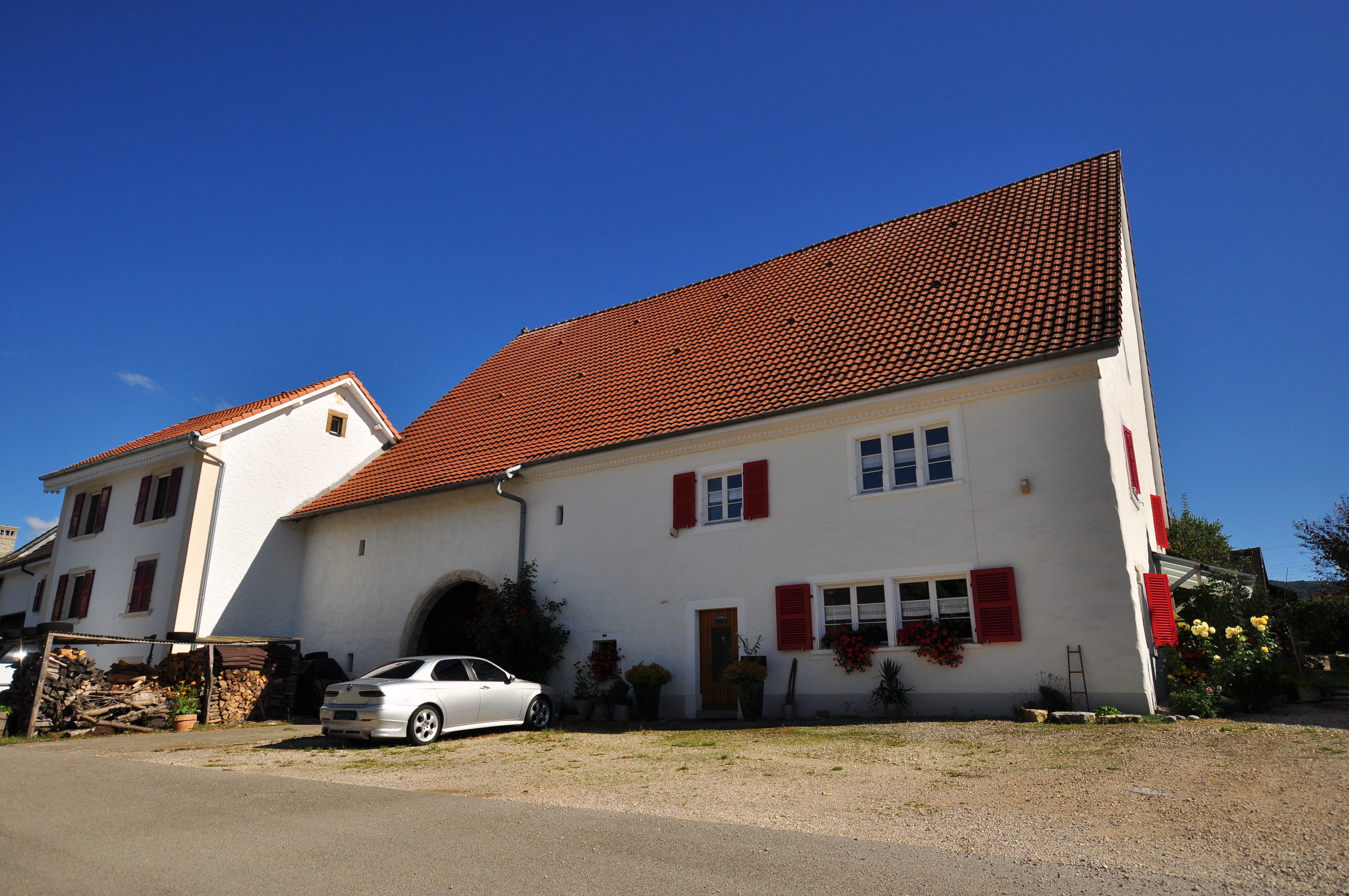
Farm House at Grand-Rue 101

The castle ruins and abandoned village at Asuel Castle and the farm house at Grand-Rue No 101 in Miécourt are listed as Swiss heritage site of national significance. The entire village of Miécourt and the Pleujouse area are part of the Inventory of Swiss Heritage Sites.

== Politics ==
In the 2007 federal election the most popular party was the SPS which received 30.8% of the vote. The next three most popular parties were the CVP (24.9%), the SVP (20%) and the FDP (18.4%).

== Economy ==
As of 2010, La Baroche had an unemployment rate of 3.7%. As of 2008, there were 115 people employed in the primary economic sector and about 50 businesses involved in this sector. 125 people were employed in the secondary sector and there were 18 businesses in this sector. 254 people were employed in the tertiary sector, with 33 businesses in this sector.

Of the working population, 6.7% used public transportation to get to work, and 62.6% used a private car.

== Education ==
The Canton of Jura school system provides two year of non-obligatory Kindergarten, followed by six years of Primary school. This is followed by three years of obligatory lower Secondary school where the students are separated according to ability and aptitude. Following the lower Secondary students may attend a three or four year optional upper Secondary school followed by some form of Tertiary school or they may enter an apprenticeship.

During the 2009-10 school year, there were a total of 134 students attending 8 classes in La Baroche. There were 2 kindergarten classes with a total of 29 students in the municipality. The municipality had 6 primary classes and 105 students. There are only nine Secondary schools in the canton, so all the students from La Baroche attend their secondary school in another municipality.
