= Asuel =

- Former municipality
- Coat of arms
- Location of Asuel
- Location within Switzerland Location within Canton of Jura
- Coordinates: 47°24′N 07°13′E
- Country: Switzerland
- Canton: Jura
- District: Porrentruy
- Municipality: La Baroche

Area
  - Total: 10.14 km^{2} (3.92 sq mi)
- Elevation: 569 m (1,867 ft)

Population (2003)
  - Total: 203
  - Density: 20.0/km^{2} (51.9/sq mi)
- Time zone: UTC+01:00 (CET)
  - Summer (DST): UTC+02:00 (CEST)
- Postal code: 2954
- SFOS number: 6772
- ISO 3166 code: CH-JU
- Surrounded by: Pleujouse, Fregiécourt, Cornol, Montmelon, Saint-Ursanne, Boécourt, Bourrignon
- Website: SFSO statistics

Asuel (French pronunciation: [asɥɛl]) is a village and a former municipality in the district of Porrentruy in the canton of Jura in Switzerland. Since January 1, 2009 it is a part of the new municipality La Baroche.

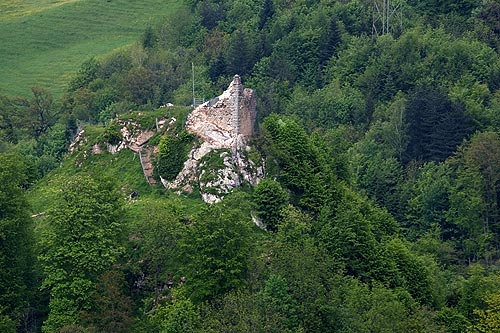
Castle ruin near Asuel.

== See also ==
- Asuel Castle
