= Pleujouse =

- Former municipality
- Location of Pleujouse
- Location within Switzerland Location within Canton of Jura
- Coordinates: 47°25′N 07°13′E
- Country: Switzerland
- Canton: Jura
- District: Porrentruy

Area
  - Total: 1.82 km^{2} (0.70 sq mi)
- Elevation: 580 m (1,900 ft)

Population (2003)
  - Total: 92
  - Density: 51/km^{2} (130/sq mi)
- Time zone: UTC+01:00 (CET)
  - Summer (DST): UTC+02:00 (CEST)
- Postal code: 2953
- SFOS number: 6799
- ISO 3166 code: CH-JU
- Surrounded by: Charmoille, Fregiécourt, Asuel, Bourrignon, Pleigne
- Website: SFSO statistics

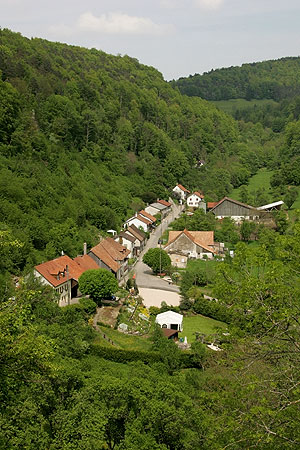

Aerial view, Pleujouse in the foreground (1950)

Pleujouse (French pronunciation: [pløʒuz]; Frainc-Comtou: Piedjouse) is a village and a former municipality in the district of Porrentruy in the canton of Jura in Switzerland. Since 2009, it has been part of the new municipality La Baroche.
