= Bourrignon =

- Municipality
- Coat of arms
- Location of Bourrignon
- Location within Switzerland Location within Canton of Jura
- Coordinates: 47°24′N 07°15′E
- Country: Switzerland
- Canton: Jura
- District: Delémont

Government
  - Executive: Conseil communal with 5 members
  - Mayor: Maire; Didier Torti (as of 2026)

Area
  - Total: 13.56 km^{2} (5.24 sq mi)
- Elevation: 770 m (2,530 ft)

Population (2003)
  - Total: 293
  - Density: 21.6/km^{2} (56.0/sq mi)
- Time zone: UTC+01:00 (CET)
  - Summer (DST): UTC+02:00 (CEST)
- Postal code: 2803
- SFOS number: 6703
- ISO 3166 code: CH-JU
- Surrounded by: Asuel, Pleujouse, Pleigne, Delémont, Develier, Boécourt
- Website: www.bourrignon.ch

Bourrignon (French pronunciation: [buʁiɲɔ̃]; Frainc-Comtou: Borgnon) is a municipality in the district of Delémont in the canton of Jura in Switzerland.

== History ==
Bourrignon is first mentioned in 1136 as Borognuns. In 1295 it was mentioned as Burgis. The municipality was formerly known by its German name Bürkis, however, that name is no longer used.

== Geography ==
Aerial view (1950)

Bourrignon has an area of 13.55 km^{2} (5.23 sq mi). Of this area, 8.85 km^{2} (3.42 mi^{2}) or 65.3% is used for agricultural purposes, while 4.35 km^{2} (1.68 mi^{2}) or 32.1% is forested. Of the rest of the land, 0.33 km^{2} (0.13 mi^{2}) or 2.4% is settled (buildings or roads), 0.01 km^{2} (2.5 acres) or 0.1% is either rivers or lakes and 0.01 km^{2} (2.5 acres) or 0.1% is unproductive land.

Of the built up area, housing and buildings made up 1.4% and transportation infrastructure made up 0.9%. Out of the forested land, 29.5% of the total land area is heavily forested and 2.6% is covered with orchards or small clusters of trees. Of the agricultural land, 24.0% is used for growing crops and 17.2% is pastures and 23.8% is used for alpine pastures. All the water in the municipality is flowing water.

The municipality is located in the Delemont district, on a terrace on the northern slope of the Les Rangiers mountain chain.

== Coat of arms ==
The blazon of the municipal coat of arms is Argent, from a Base Vert issuant a Castle Sable with two stories both embattled, first towered in sinister and second in dexter.

== Demographics ==
Bourrignon has a population (as of December 2020) of 270. As of 2008, 2.5% of the population are resident foreign nationals. Over the last 10 years (2000–2010) the population has changed at a rate of -7.5%. Migration accounted for -10.8%, while births and deaths accounted for 2%.

Most of the population (as of 2000) speaks French (268 or 93.7%) as their first language, German is the second most common (14 or 4.9%) and Serbo-Croatian is the third (3 or 1.0%).

As of 2008, the population was 47.9% male and 52.1% female. The population was made up of 133 Swiss men (47.2% of the population) and 2 (0.7%) non-Swiss men. There were 142 Swiss women (50.4%) and 5 (1.8%) non-Swiss women. Of the population in the municipality, 179 or about 62.6% were born in Bourrignon and lived there in 2000. There were 61 or 21.3% who were born in the same canton, while 31 or 10.8% were born somewhere else in Switzerland, and 12 or 4.2% were born outside of Switzerland.

As of 2000, children and teenagers (0–19 years old) make up 37.8% of the population, while adults (20–64 years old) make up 50% and seniors (over 64 years old) make up 12.2%.

As of 2000, there were 138 people who were single and never married in the municipality. There were 137 married individuals, 8 widows or widowers and 3 individuals who are divorced.

As of 2000, there were 91 private households in the municipality, and an average of 3.1 persons per household. There were 19 households that consist of only one person and 20 households with five or more people. In 2000, a total of 90 apartments (90.9% of the total) were permanently occupied, while 6 apartments (6.1%) were seasonally occupied and 3 apartments (3.0%) were empty. The vacancy rate for the municipality, in 2010, was 3.81%.

The historical population is given in the following chart:

== Sights ==
The entire village of Bourrignon is designated as part of the Inventory of Swiss Heritage Sites.

== Politics ==
In the 2007 federal election the most popular party was the CVP which received 28.08% of the vote. The next three most popular parties were the SPS (27.79%), the CSP (19.77%) and the SVP (19.2%). In the federal election, a total of 176 votes were cast, and the voter turnout was 72.1%.

== Economy ==
As of 2010, Bourrignon had an unemployment rate of 2.3%. As of 2008, there were 57 people employed in the primary economic sector and about 19 businesses involved in this sector. 8 people were employed in the secondary sector and there were 2 businesses in this sector. 10 people were employed in the tertiary sector, with 4 businesses in this sector. There were 122 residents of the municipality who were employed in some capacity, of which females made up 36.1% of the workforce.

In 2008 the total number of full-time equivalent jobs was 57. The number of jobs in the primary sector was 42, all of which were in agriculture. The number of jobs in the secondary sector was 7, all of which were in manufacturing. The number of jobs in the tertiary sector was 8. In the tertiary sector; 6 or 75.0% were in wholesale or retail sales or the repair of motor vehicles, 1 was in the movement and storage of goods and 1 was in the information industry.

In 2000, there were 7 workers who commuted into the municipality and 54 workers who commuted away. The municipality is a net exporter of workers, with about 7.7 workers leaving the municipality for every one entering. Of the working population, 9% used public transportation to get to work, and 50% used a private car.

== Religion ==
From the 2000 census, 229 or 80.1% were Roman Catholic, while 13 or 4.5% belonged to the Swiss Reformed Church. Of the rest of the population, there were 4 members of an Orthodox church (or about 1.40% of the population), and there were 58 individuals (or about 20.28% of the population) who belonged to another Christian church. There were 1 individual who belonged to another church. 9 (or about 3.15% of the population) belonged to no church, are agnostic or atheist, and 1 individuals (or about 0.35% of the population) did not answer the question.

== Education ==
In Bourrignon about 76 or (26.6%) of the population have completed non-mandatory upper secondary education, and 24 or (8.4%) have completed additional higher education (either university or a Fachhochschule). Of the 24 who completed tertiary schooling, 79.2% were Swiss men, 16.7% were Swiss women.

The Canton of Jura school system provides two year of non-obligatory Kindergarten, followed by six years of Primary school. This is followed by three years of obligatory lower Secondary school where the students are separated according to ability and aptitude. Following the lower Secondary students may attend a three or four year optional upper Secondary school followed by some form of Tertiary school or they may enter an apprenticeship.

During the 2009–10 school year, there were no students attending school in Bourrignon. As of 2000, there were 3 students in Bourrignon who came from another municipality, while 33 residents attended schools outside the municipality.
