= Montvoie Castle =

Castle in Clos du Doubs, Switzerland

Coordinates: 47°21′57″N 7°03′24″E

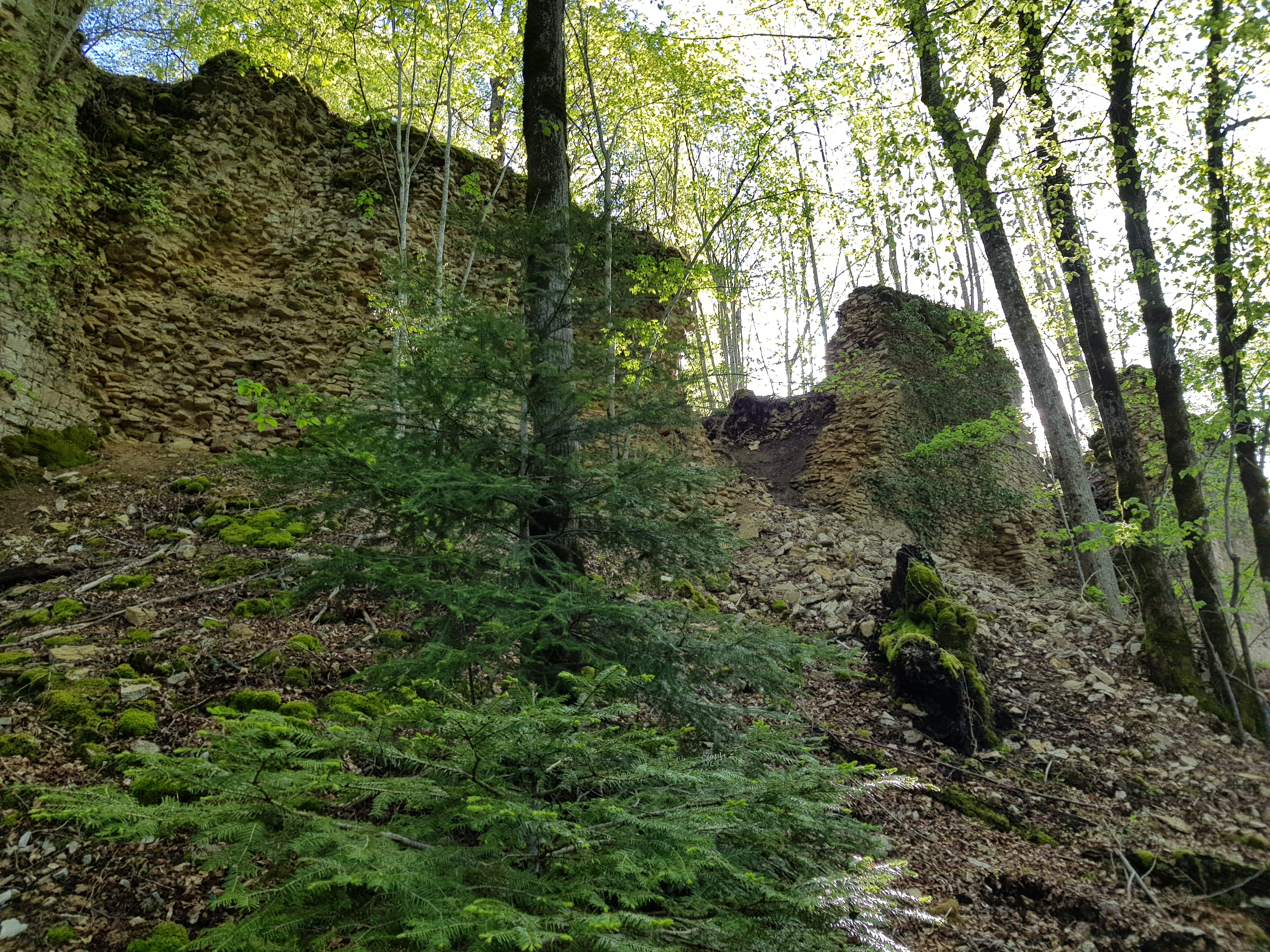

Montvoie Castle is a castle in the municipality of Clos du Doubs of the Canton of Jura in Switzerland. It is a Swiss heritage site of national significance.

== See also ==
- List of castles in Switzerland
