= Asuel Castle =

Castle in La Baroche, Switzerland

Coordinates: 47°23′57″N 7°12′36″E

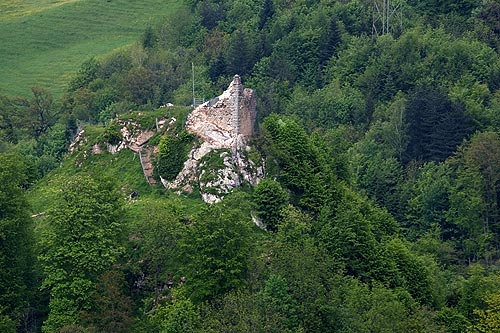
Asuel Castle

Asuel Castle is a ruined castle near Asuel, in the municipality of La Baroche of the Canton of Jura in Switzerland. It is a Swiss heritage site of national significance.

== See also ==
- List of castles in Switzerland
