= Col des Rangiers =

Mountain pass (Jura, Switzerland)

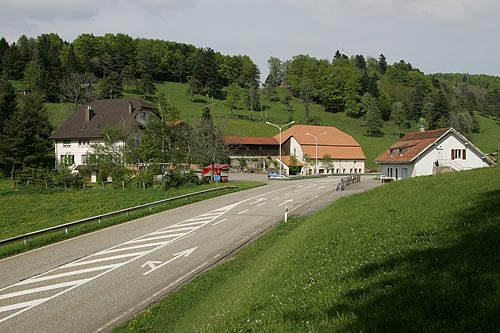
- Col des Rangiers
- Interactive map of Col des Rangiers
- Elevation: 856 m (2,808 ft)

Third Approach
- Location: Switzerland
- Range: Jura Mountains
- Coordinates: 47°23′5.53″N 7°13′8.6″E

Col des Rangiers (el. 856 m.) is a mountain pass in Saint-Ursanne the canton of Jura in Switzerland.

It connects Courgenay and Develier.
