= Cornol =

- Municipality
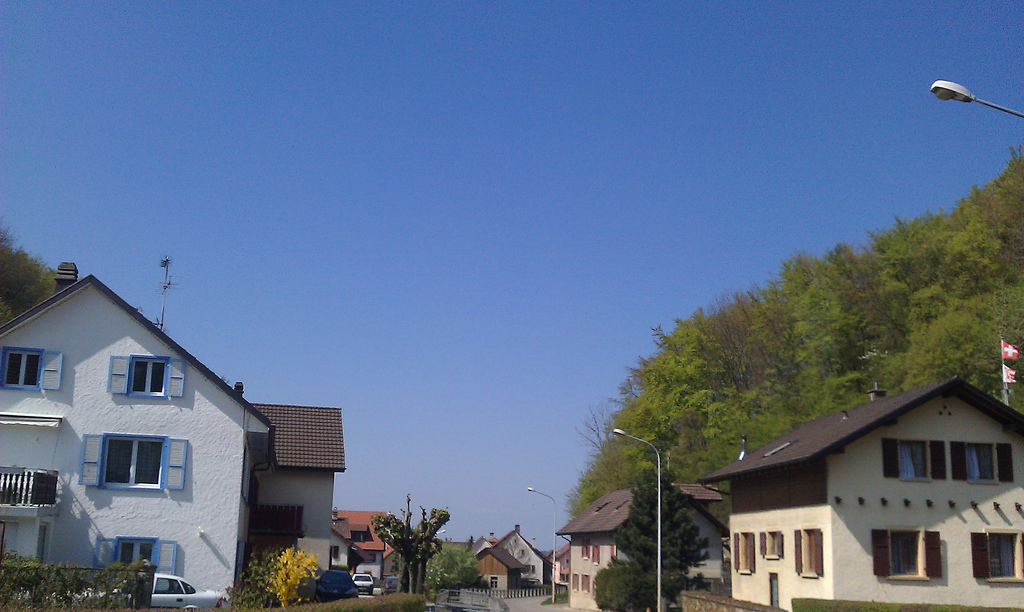
- Cornol village

- Coat of arms
- Location of Cornol
- Location within Switzerland Location within Canton of Jura
- Coordinates: 47°24′N 07°10′E
- Country: Switzerland
- Canton: Jura
- District: Porrentruy

Government
  - Executive: Conseil communal with 7 members
  - Mayor: Maire; Gilles Villard (as of 2026)

Area
  - Total: 10.43 km^{2} (4.03 sq mi)
- Elevation: 520 m (1,710 ft)

Population (2003)
  - Total: 852
  - Density: 81.7/km^{2} (212/sq mi)
- Time zone: UTC+01:00 (CET)
  - Summer (DST): UTC+02:00 (CEST)
- Postal code: 2952
- SFOS number: 6782
- ISO 3166 code: CH-JU
- Surrounded by: Courgenay, Alle, Miécourt, Fregiécourt, Asuel, Montmelon
- Website: https://www.cornol.ch/

Cornol (French pronunciation: [kɔʁnɔl]; Frainc-Comtou: Cornô) is a municipality in the district of Porrentruy in the canton of Jura in Switzerland.

== History ==
Cornol is first mentioned in 1136 as Coronotum.

== Geography ==
Aerial view (1950)

Cornol has an area of 10.45 km^{2} (4.03 sq mi). Of this area, 6.03 km^{2} (2.33 mi^{2}) or 57.8% is used for agricultural purposes, while 3.51 km^{2} (1.36 mi^{2}) or 33.6% is forested. Of the rest of the land, 0.78 km^{2} (0.30 mi^{2}) or 7.5% is settled (buildings or roads), 0.07 km^{2} (17 acres) or 0.7% is either rivers or lakes and 0.08 km^{2} (20 acres) or 0.8% is unproductive land. The Étang de la Montoie, a 1.4-hectare (3.5-acre) pond, is located in Cornol.

Of the built-up area, housing and buildings made up 2.9% and transportation infrastructure made up 3.4%. Out of the forested land, 32.2% of the total land area is heavily forested and 1.4% is covered with orchards or small clusters of trees. Of the agricultural land, 35.0% is used for growing crops and 16.5% is pastures, while 2.3% is used for orchards or vine crops and 4.0% is used for alpine pastures. Of the water in the municipality, 0.3% is in lakes and 0.4% is in rivers and streams.

The municipality is located in the Porrentruy district, on the road to Les Rangiers.

== Coat of arms ==
The blazon of the municipal coat of arms is Argent, three Moors' heads proper banded Gules.

== Demographics ==
Cornol has a population (as of December 2020) of 1,028. As of 2008, 3.8% of the population are resident foreign nationals. Over the last 10 years (2000–2010) the population has changed at a rate of 9.7%. Migration accounted for 10.2%, while births and deaths accounted for 0%.

Most of the population (as of 2000) speaks French (742 or 93.1%) as their first language, German is the second most common (29 or 3.6%) and Italian is the third (9 or 1.1%).

As of 2008, the population was 50.3% male and 49.7% female. The population was made up of 431 Swiss men (48.3% of the population) and 18 (2.0%) non-Swiss men. There were 425 Swiss women (47.6%) and 18 (2.0%) non-Swiss women. Of the population in the municipality, 350 or about 43.9% were born in Cornol and lived there in 2000. There were 245 or 30.7% who were born in the same canton, while 76 or 9.5% were born somewhere else in Switzerland, and 97 or 12.2% were born outside of Switzerland.

As of 2000, children and teenagers (0–19 years old) make up 24.2% of the population, while adults (20–64 years old) make up 59.1% and seniors (over 64 years old) make up 16.7%.

As of 2000, there were 302 people who were single and never married in the municipality. There were 396 married individuals, 51 widows or widowers and 48 individuals who are divorced.

As of 2000, there were 332 private households in the municipality, and an average of 2.4 persons per household. There were 93 households that consist of only one person and 24 households with five or more people. In 2000, a total of 325 apartments (90.0% of the total) were permanently occupied, while 25 apartments (6.9%) were seasonally occupied and 11 apartments (3.0%) were empty. The vacancy rate for the municipality, in 2010, was 2.02%.

The historical population is given in the following chart:

== Heritage sites of national significance ==
The prehistoric site and medieval castle at Mont Terri is listed as a Swiss heritage site of national significance.

== Politics ==
In the 2007 federal election the most popular party was the CVP which received 37.09% of the vote. The next three most popular parties were the SPS (26.43%), the SVP (15.37%) and the FDP (13.73%). In the federal election, a total of 250 votes were cast, and the voter turnout was 37.5%.

== Economy ==
As of 2010, Cornol had an unemployment rate of 3.8%. As of 2008, there were 35 people employed in the primary economic sector and about 12 businesses involved in this sector. 325 people were employed in the secondary sector and there were 18 businesses in this sector. 88 people were employed in the tertiary sector, with 26 businesses in this sector. There were 395 residents of the municipality who were employed in some capacity, of which females made up 41.0% of the workforce.

In 2008 the total number of full-time equivalent jobs was 418. The number of jobs in the primary sector was 27, all of which were in agriculture. The number of jobs in the secondary sector was 317 of which 277 or (87.4%) were in manufacturing and 40 (12.6%) were in construction. The number of jobs in the tertiary sector was 74. In the tertiary sector; 20 or 27.0% were in wholesale or retail sales or the repair of motor vehicles, 19 or 25.7% were in the movement and storage of goods, 8 or 10.8% were in a hotel or restaurant, 4 or 5.4% were the insurance or financial industry, 5 or 6.8% were technical professionals or scientists, 8 or 10.8% were in education and 1 was in health care.

In 2000, there were 209 workers who commuted into the municipality and 245 workers who commuted away. The municipality is a net exporter of workers, with about 1.2 workers leaving the municipality for every one entering. About 20.1% of the workforce coming into Cornol are coming from outside Switzerland. Of the working population, 6.1% used public transportation to get to work, and 72.9% used a private car.

== Religion ==
From the 2000 census, 656 or 82.3% were Roman Catholic, while 51 or 6.4% belonged to the Swiss Reformed Church. Of the rest of the population, there was 1 member of an Orthodox church, there were 4 individuals (or about 0.50% of the population) who belonged to the Christian Catholic Church, and there were 16 individuals (or about 2.01% of the population) who belonged to another Christian church. There were 2 (or about 0.25% of the population) who were Islamic. There was 1 person who was Buddhist and 5 individuals who belonged to another church. 37 (or about 4.64% of the population) belonged to no church, are agnostic or atheist, and 32 individuals (or about 4.02% of the population) did not answer the question.

== Education ==
In Cornol about 252 or (31.6%) of the population have completed non-mandatory upper secondary education, and 42 or (5.3%) have completed additional higher education (either university or a Fachhochschule). Of the 42 who completed tertiary schooling, 76.2% were Swiss men, 14.3% were Swiss women.

The Canton of Jura school system provides two year of non-obligatory Kindergarten, followed by six years of Primary school. This is followed by three years of obligatory lower Secondary school where the students are separated according to ability and aptitude. Following the lower Secondary students may attend a three or four year optional upper Secondary school followed by some form of Tertiary school or they may enter an apprenticeship.

During the 2009–10 school year, there were a total of 86 students attending 5 classes in Cornol. There was one kindergarten class with a total of 13 students in the municipality. The municipality had 4 primary classes and 73 students. There are only nine secondary schools in the canton, so all the students from Cornol attend their secondary school in another municipality.

As of 2000, there were 40 students from Cornol who attended schools outside the municipality.
