= Levoncourt, Haut-Rhin =

Commune in Grand Est, France

Levoncourt
- Commune
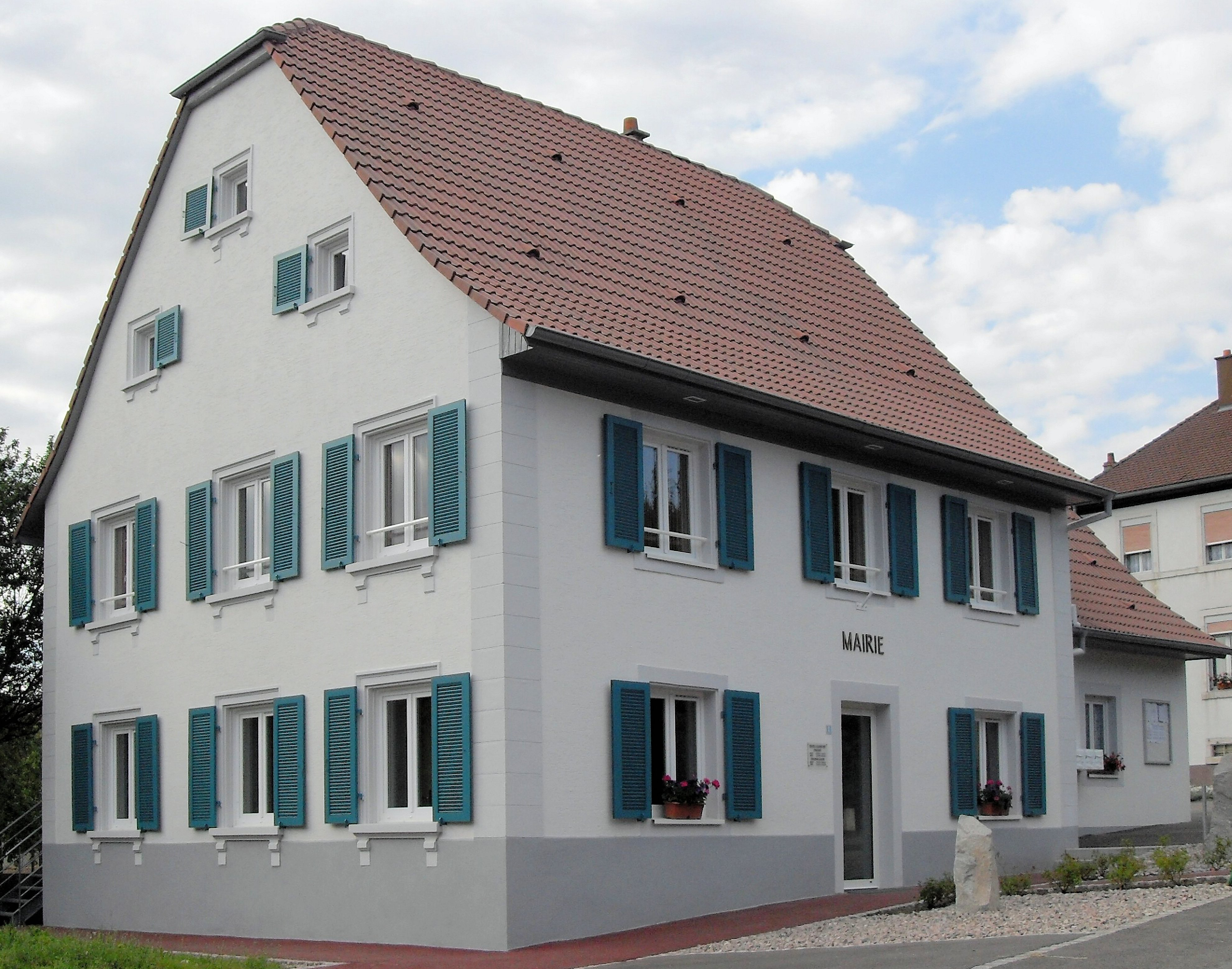
- The town hall in Levoncourt

- Coat of arms
- Location of Levoncourt
- Location within France Location within Grand Est
- Coordinates: 47°26′58″N 7°12′19″E
- Country: France
- Region: Grand Est
- Department: Haut-Rhin
- Arrondissement: Altkirch
- Canton: Altkirch

Government
  - Mayor (2020–2026): Hervé Walter
- Area^{1}: 5.28 km^{2} (2.04 sq mi)
- Elevation: 475 m (1,558 ft)
- Highest elevation: 741 m (2,431 ft)
- Lowest elevation: 448 m (1,470 ft)
- Population (2023): 250
  - Density: 47/km^{2} (120/sq mi)
- Time zone: UTC+01:00 (CET)
  - Summer (DST): UTC+02:00 (CEST)
- INSEE/Postal code: 68181 /68480
- ^{1} French Land Register data, which excludes lakes, ponds, glaciers > 1 km^{2} (0.386 sq mi or 247 acres) and river estuaries.

Levoncourt (German: Luffendorf) is a commune in the Haut-Rhin department in Alsace in north-eastern France.

== See also ==
- Communes of the Haut-Rhin département
