= Western Switzerland Railways =

Swiss railway companies

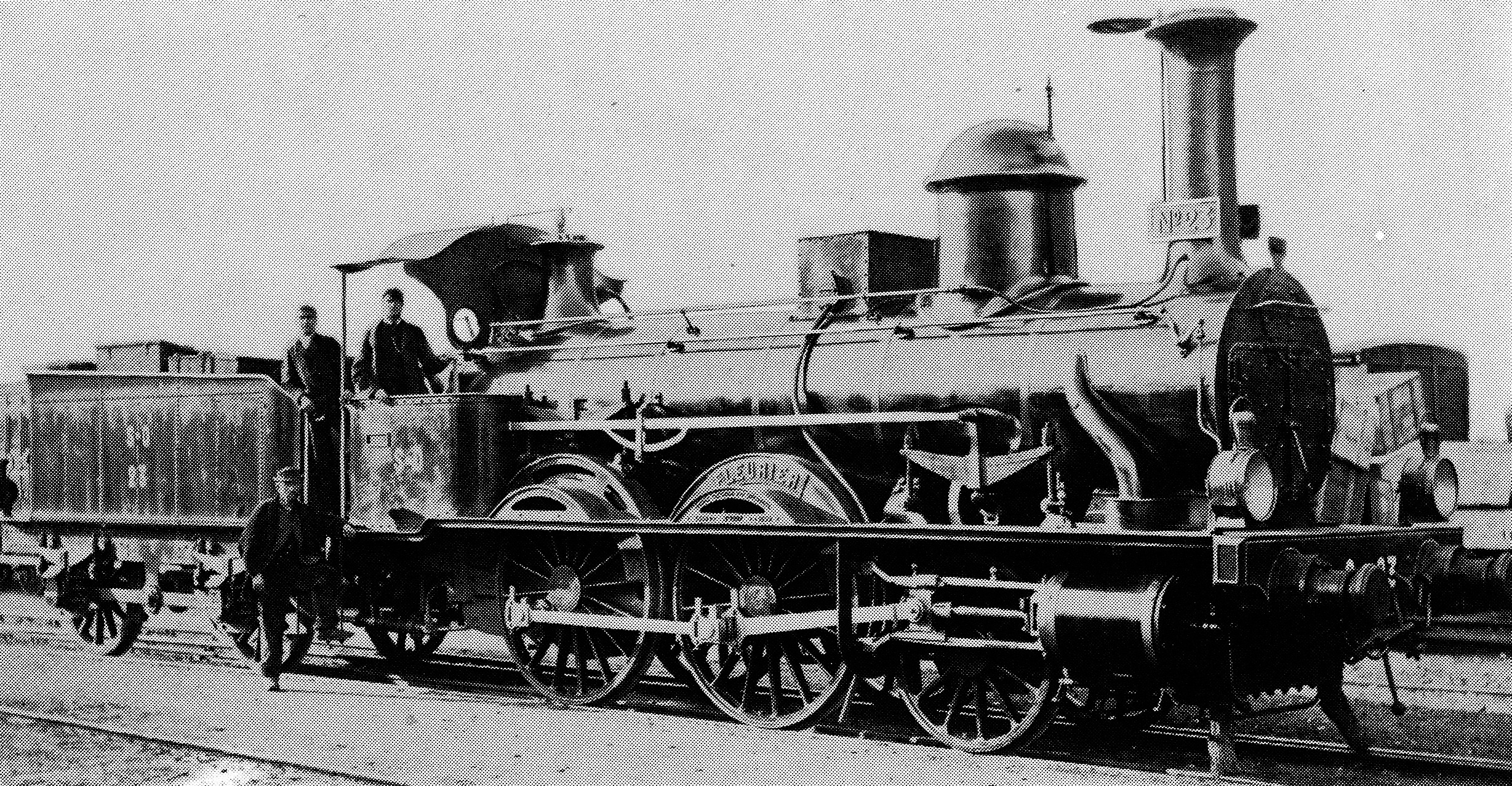
Locomotive of the SO.

The Western Switzerland Railways (Chemins de fer de la Suisse Occidentale, shortened to Suisse-Occidentale; SO or S-O), were initially a joint operation of three Swiss railway companies, but these companies merged on 1 January 1872. The company was called the Western Switzerland–Simplon Railways (Chemins de fer de la Suisse Occidentale et du Simplon, shortened to Suisse-Occidentale–Simplon; SOS or SO-S) from 28 June 1881. The SOS merged with the Bernese Jura Railways (Chemins de fer du Jura bernois; JBL) to form the Jura–Simplon Railways (Compagnie des Chemins de Fer Jura–Simplon; JS) on 1 January 1890.

== Association of the Railways of Western Switzerland ==
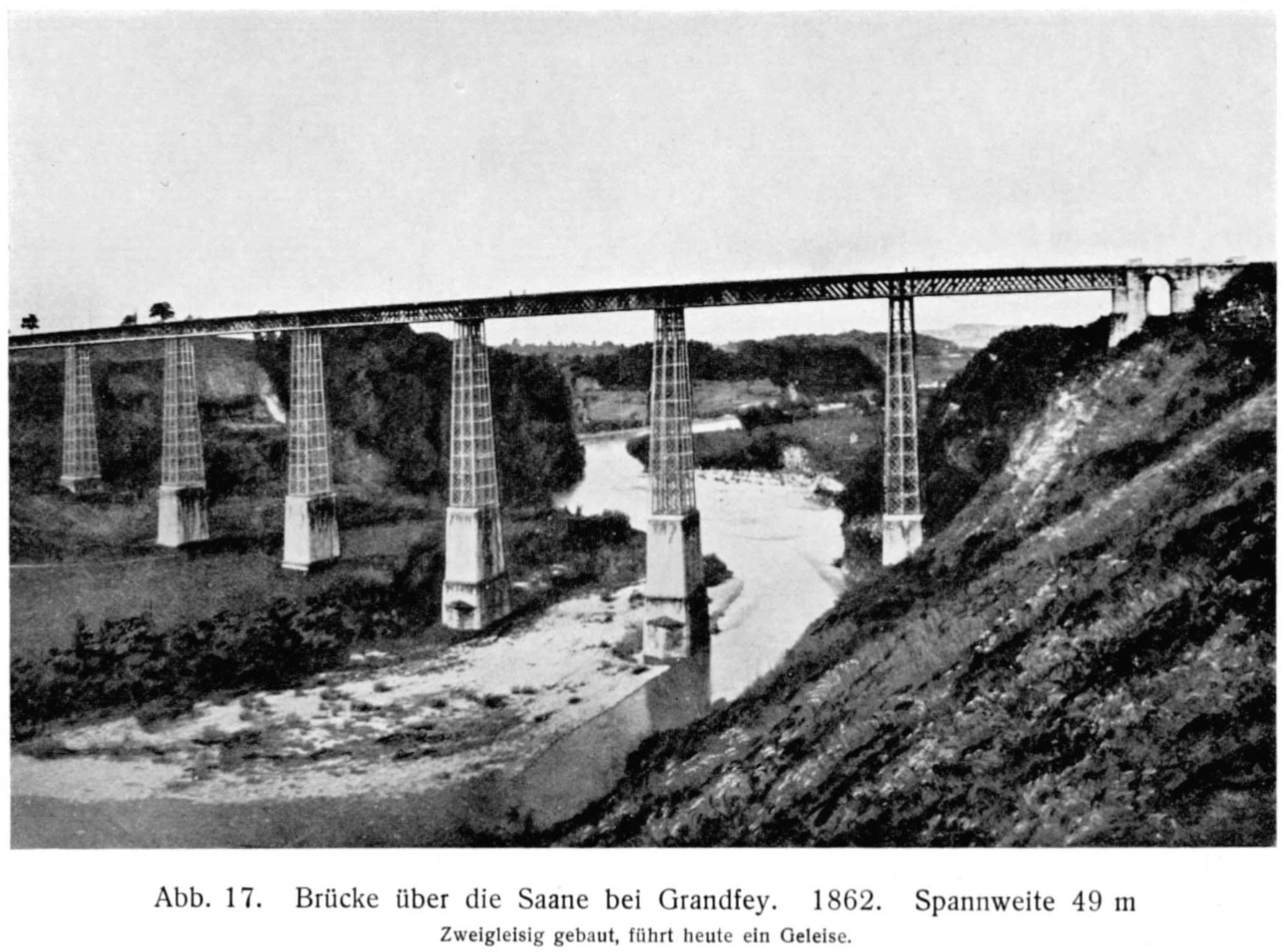
Grandfey Viaduct on the Lausanne–Fribourg–Bern railway over the Saane

In the early 1860s, the rail links between Romandy and German-speaking Switzerland were controlled by three railway companies, the West Switzerland Company (Compagnie de l’Ouest Suisse; SO), the Franco-Swiss Company (Franco-Suisse, FS) and the Lausanne–Fribourg–Bern Railway (Chemin de fer Lausanne–Fribourg–Berne, LFB). One of the lines ran from Lausanne along the southern foot of the Jura to Biel/Bienne and on to Herzogenbuchsee, where it met the competing line running via Fribourg and Bern. The West Switzerland and Franco-Swiss were thus opponents of the Lausanne–Fribourg–Bern, which also owned the westernmost Geneva–Versoix line. This harsh competitive situation was compounded by financial difficulties due to construction cost overruns.

After long and difficult negotiations, the three railway companies formed a business association under the name of the Association des chemins de fer de la Suisse Occidentale (Association of the Railways of Western Switzerland) on 1 January 1865. Each railway company provided its own infrastructure and rolling stock. Revenue was distributed according to a fixed ratio. The business community was managed by a three-member operating committee—with each company nominating a representative—and a supervisory board. Three members of the Supervisory Board were appointed by the Western Switzerland and two each by Franco-Swiss and the canton of Fribourg. The association paid 8,000 francs per kilometre per year to the firm of Laurent-Bergeron et Comp. The financial situation of the three western Swiss railways stabilised and from 1868 onwards the association was able to pay a very modest dividend. Financial and construction matters remained the responsibility of individual railway companies.

=== Ownership of the network of the Association of the Railways of Western Switzerland ===
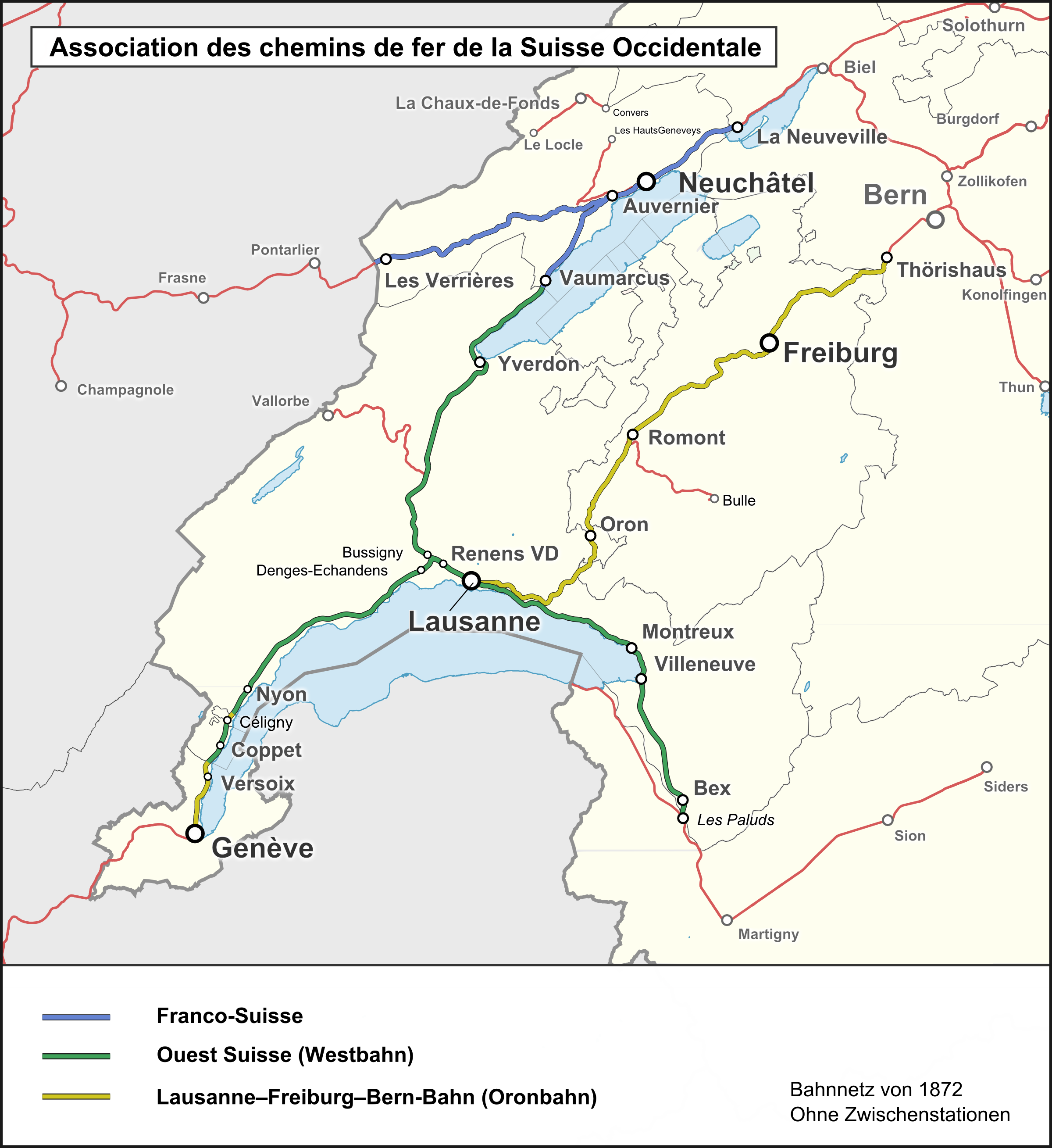
Ownership of the network of the Association of the Railways of Western Switzerland

The map shows the ownership structure of the network of the Association of French-Swiss Railways at the end of 1871 before its merger as the Western Switzerland Railways.

== Western Switzerland Railways Company ==
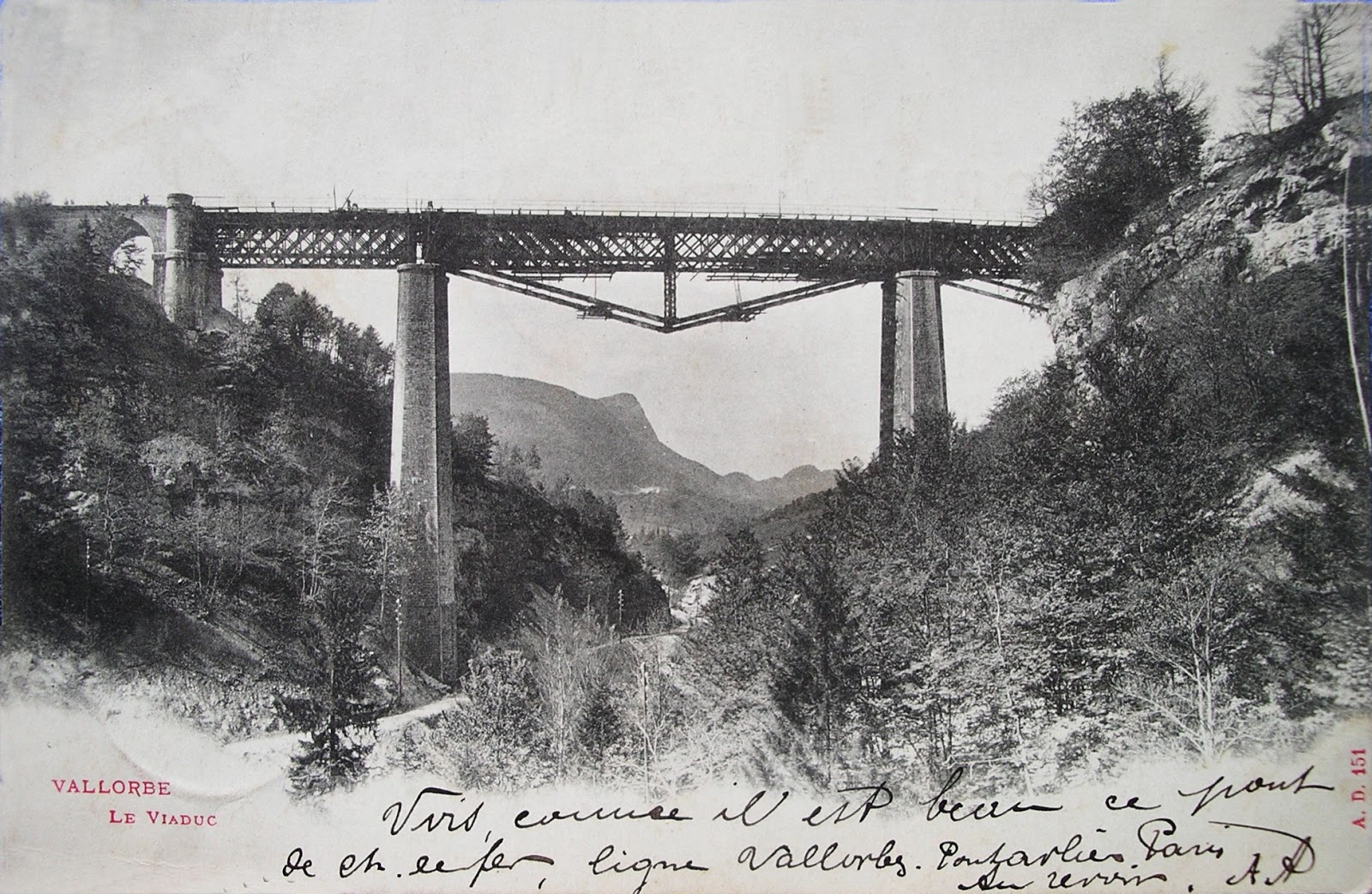
Le Day Viaduct on the line to Paris between Pontarlier and Vallorbe

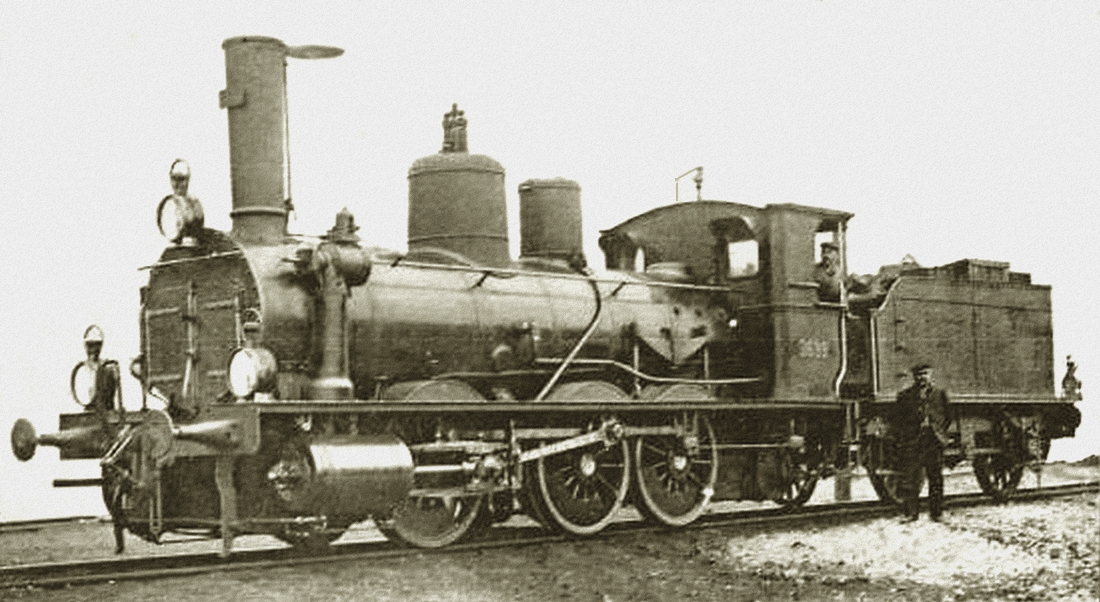
The D 3/3 No. 503 of the SOS was the first compound locomotive in Switzerland.

The three railways agreed to intensify their cooperation in 1871. The business would no longer be leased to a company, but run directly. Under pressure from the French-speaking cantons, especially Vaud, the three West Swiss railways merged on 1 January 1872. The new Western Switzerland Railway Company (Chemins de fer de la Suisse Occidentale et du Simplon) now had the largest route network of any Swiss rail company with 315 kilometres of line. The cantons used their influence to help the Western Switzerland build the Palezieux–Payerne–Fräschels line (known in French as the ligne de la Broye longitudinale—longitudinal Broye line) (Note: The Fräschels–Lyss section of the longitudinal Broye line in the canton of Bern was built by the Chemins de fer du Jura bernois (JBL).) and the Fribourg–Yverdon railway (transverse Broye line). These lines were originally intended to form the western end of the Swiss National Railway (Schweizerischen Nationalbahn; SNB).

The shares of the merged railway companies were exchanged for those of the Western Switzerland Railway, whereby, depending on the share price, additional payments were made in the form of bonds totalling Swiss francs (CFF) 14 million. The capital of the Western Switzerland was composed of shares worth CFF 85 million and bonds worth CFF 102 million at the end of 1876 following the closing of this financial transaction. The Swiss Central Railway (Schweizerische Schweizerische Centralbahn) and the Swiss Northeastern Railway (Schweizerische Nordostbahn), together with a banking group that was responsible for funding the expansion of rail networks, attempted unsuccessfully to raise the necessary funds for the Western Switzerland and to form a joint operation between the three railways. The funding was provided by the Societe Suisse pour l'industrie des chemins de fer ("Swiss Company for the Railway Industry"), which forced the SO to reorganise the administration. Its board of four members was replaced by a single director in 1875.

In 1872, the Western Switzerland acquired a significant stake in the Jougne-Eclépens Railway (Chemin de fer de Jougne à Eclépens; JE), which had a direct connection to the network of the French Chemins de fer de Paris à Lyon et à la Méditerranée (PLM). The SO wanted to prevent a competitor taking over the JE, which was constantly fighting financial problems. The Jougne-Eclépens Railway went bankrupt in 1876 and was taken over fully by the Western Switzerland.

There were four deaths and three injuries after a collision in Palézieux on 7 July 1876.

== Western Switzerland–Simplon Railways ==
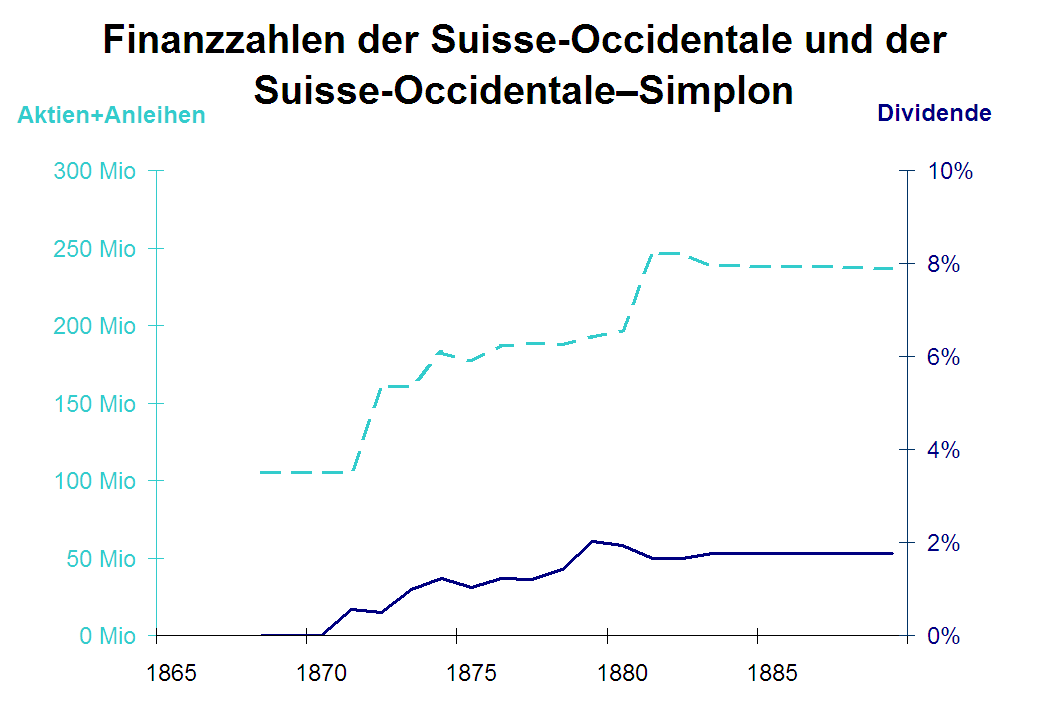
Their operating results allowed Western Switzerland and Western Switzerland–Simplon to pay a dividend every year.

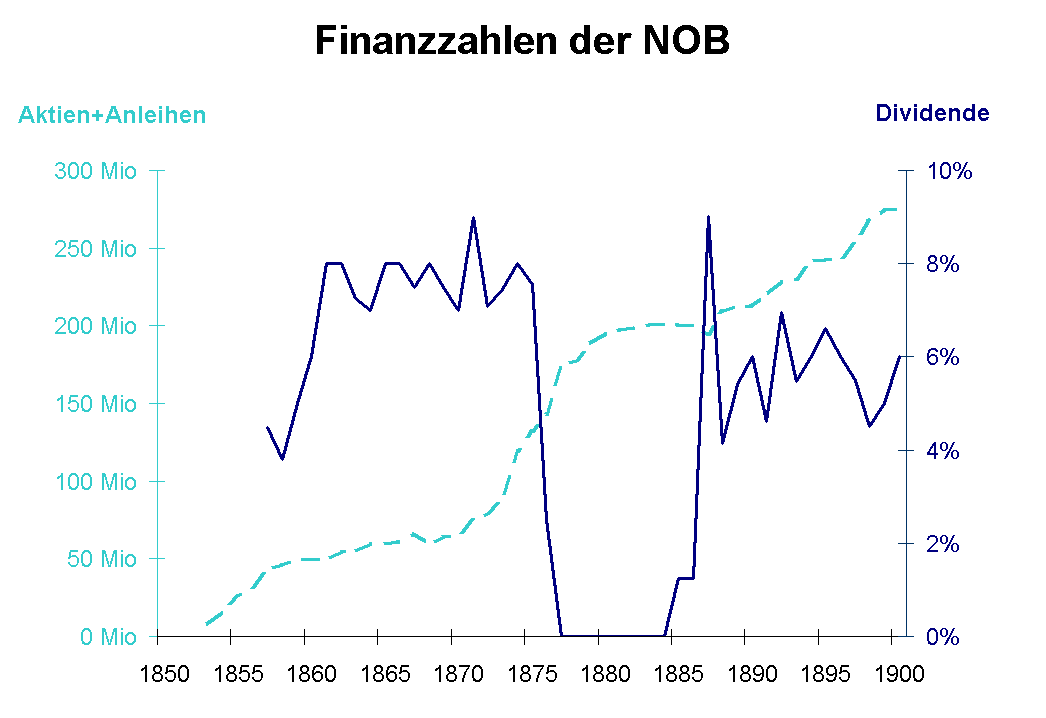
In contrast, the NOB, like other railway companies, experienced a profit slump during the years of the "railway crisis".

The Western Switzerland–Simplon Railways (Suisse-Occidentale–Simplon; SOS) was created on 26 June 1881 as a result of the purchase of the Simplon Company (Ligne du Simplon; S) by the Western Switzerland at a price of around CFF 13.2 million. Since the Simplon Company was financially too weak to promote the construction of a Simplon tunnel, the canton of Vaud in particular pushed for a merger of the two railways. The SOS, with investment capital of CHF 248 million and a network length of 581 kilometres, was the largest railway company in Switzerland at the time. The Geneva–Lausanne–Brig routes and the extensions from Lausanne via Romont to Bern and via Yverdon and Neuchâtel to La Neuveville formed its main route network. Its strategically most important goal was the building of a connection from Brig to Domodossola by tunnelling under the Simplon Pass, but this did not proceed for the time being. The SOS invested around CFF 670,000 in preparatory work in 1886 alone.

The SOS commissioned the Saint-Gingolph–Saint-Maurice railway, the Swiss section of the railway along the south shore of Lake Geneva on 1 June 1886. The Savoy section from Saint-Gingolph to Évian-les-Bains belonged to the Paris-Lyon-Mediterranean Railway (Chemins de fer de Paris à Lyon et à la Méditerranée; PLM).

On 21 January 1888, large masses of rock disintegrated at Cheyres and fell on the track creating piles of rubble two or three metres high. A Payerne–Yverdon passenger train loaded with about 40 passengers ran into the rubble, causing the two locomotives to derail. The fireman of the bank engine was killed, while the other fireman and the driver of the bank engine were seriously injured.

The Western Switzerland Railway and the SOS operated other railway lines:

- Jougne–Vallorbe–Pontarlier and Verrières–Pontarlier line of the French Compagnie des chemins de fer de Paris à Lyon et à la Méditerranée (PLM)
- Bulle–Romont railway (Chemin de fer Bulle-Romont, BR)
- Pont–Vallorbe Railway (Chemin de fer Pont–Vallorbe, PV)
- Travers–Buttes railway (Régional du Val-de-Travers, RVT)
- Simplon Company (Compagnie du Simplon, S) (Note: Until the takeover on 26 June 1881)

The operating results of Western Switzerland–Simplon Railways were always positive. Freight and passenger traffic contributed approximately equally to this. The SOS was able to distribute a modest dividend every year.

=== Network of the Western Switzerland–Simplon (SOS) ===
The following map shows the Western Switzerland–Simplon route network before the merger with the Jura–Bern–Lucerne (JBL):

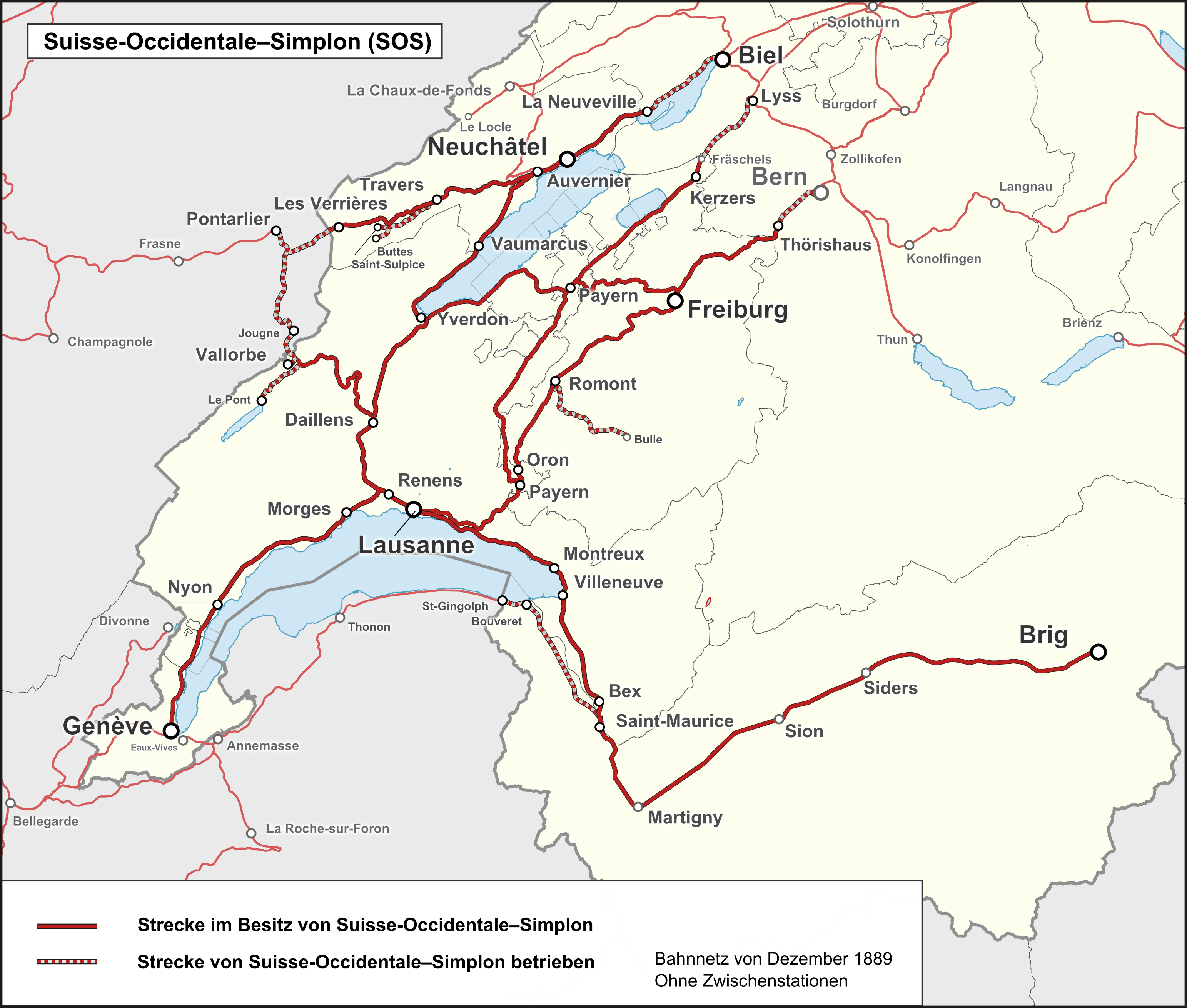
Network of the Western Switzerland–Simplon at the end of 1889

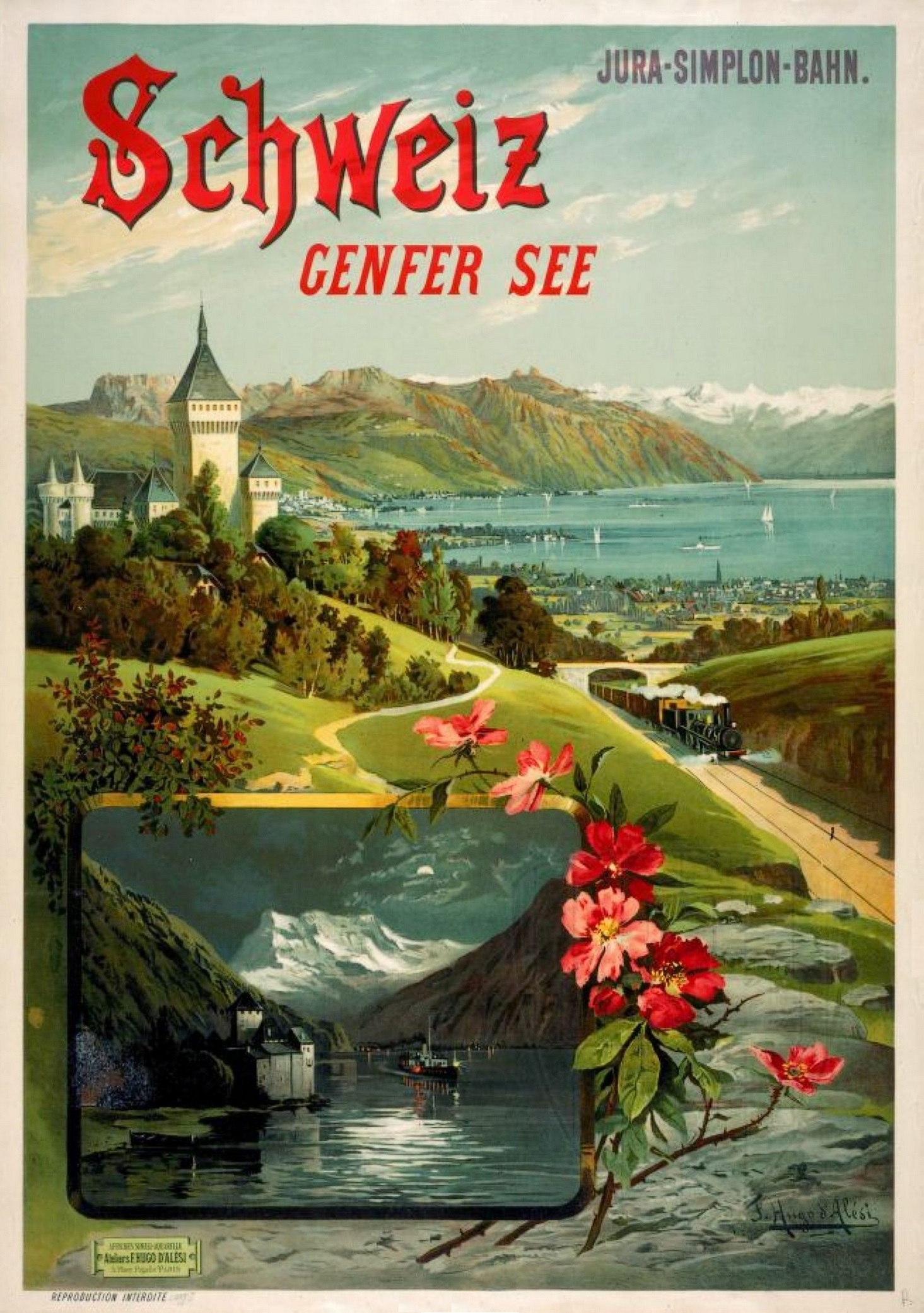
Poster of the JS from 1897

== Merger of the Jura-Simplon Railway ==
On 1 January 1890, the SOS merged with the Jura-Bern-Lucerne Railway (JBL), including the Gümligen–Lucerne line, which belonged to the canton of Bern, to form the newly established Jura–Simplon Railways (JS). The Swiss Confederation also participated in the new railway company by means of a voluntary share purchase. Exactly one year later, the Jura–Simplon Railways took over the Pont Vallorbe Railway operated by the SOS. The JS eventually initiated the construction of the Simplon Tunnel, which had been discussed for decades.

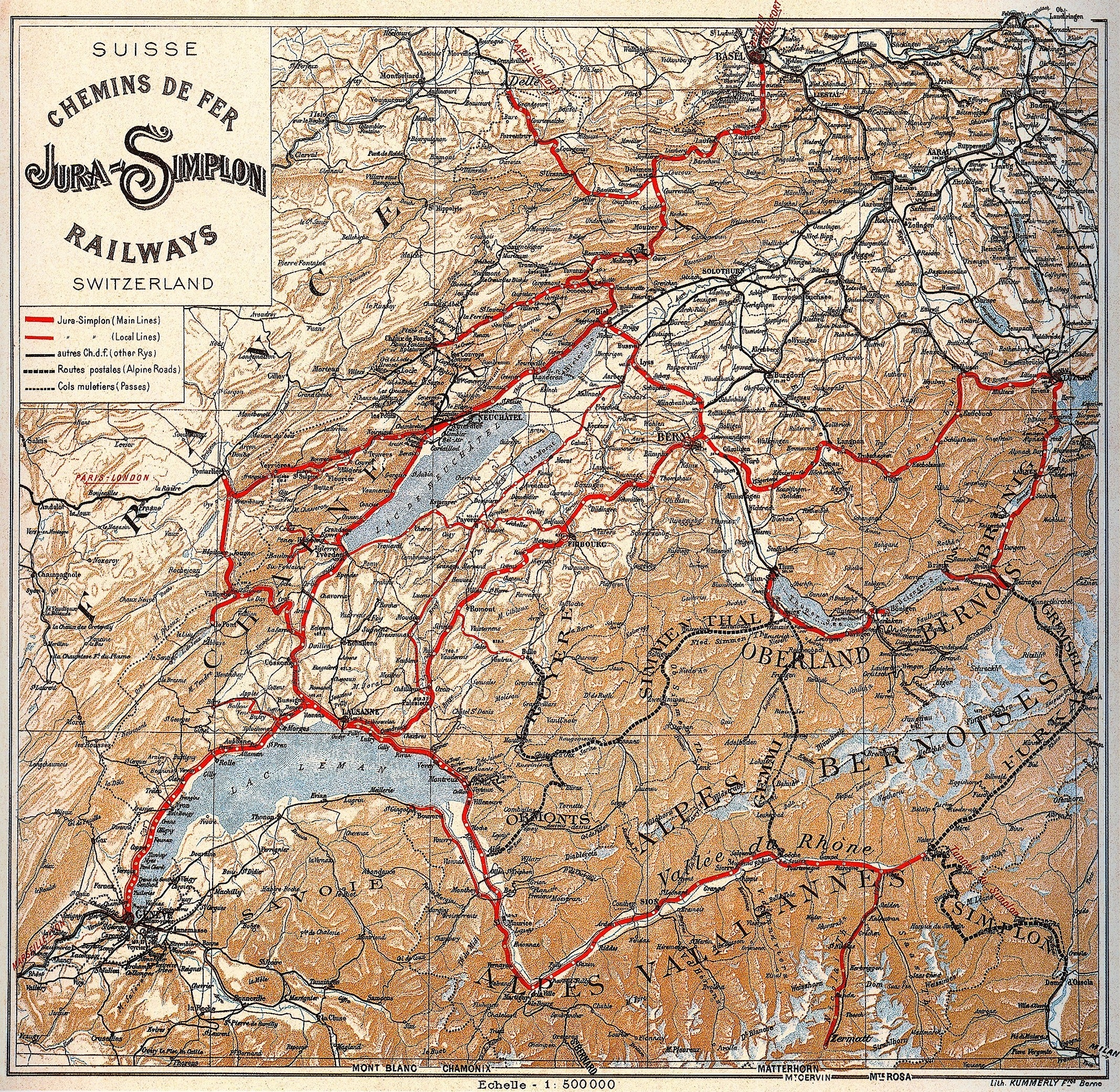
Map with the route network of the Jura-Simplon railway of 1894

== Graphic summary ==
Overview of the history of the Western Switzerland–Simplon (O: opening; T: takeover):

Western Switzerland (OS); O: 5.5.1855 T: 1.1.1872	Geneva–Versoix (GV); O: 25.6.1858 T: 1.7.1858
Lausanne-Fribourg- Berne Railway (LFB); T: 1.1.1872	Franco-Swiss (FS); O: 7.11.1859 T: 1.1.1872	Ligne d'Italie (LI); O: 14.7.1859 T: 1.6.1874
Jougne–Eclépens (JE); O: 1.1.1870 T: 20.12.1876
Western Switzerland	Simplon Company (S); T: 28.6.1881
from 28.6.1881: Western Switzerland–Simplon; T: 1.1.1890	Jura–Bern–Lucerne (JBL); T: 1.1.1890	Gümligen–Lucerne (leased by JBL); T: 1.1.1890	Pont–Vallorbe (PV); O: 31.10.1886; T: 1.1.1891
Jura–Simplon Railway (JS)

== Network ==
No.	Railway line	Section	Opened on	from	Duplicated	Remarks	Length (Note: Determined on the basis of the line kilometres)
1.	Lausanne–Biel	Lausanne–Renens	5 May 1856	OS	1872	Branched off the line to Geneva in Renens	87.72 km
1.	Lausanne–Biel	Renens–Bussigny	1 July 1855	OS	–		87.72 km
1.	Lausanne–Biel	Bussigny–Daillens–Yverdon	7 May 1855	OS	–		87.72 km
1.	Lausanne–Biel	Yverdon–Vaumarcus (VD-NE canton border)	7 Nov. 1859	OS	–		87.72 km
1.	Lausanne–Biel	Vaumarcus–Auvernier–Neuchâtel–La Neuveville (NE-BE canton border)	7 Nov. 1859	FS	–	Branched off the line to Pontarlier in Auvernier	87.72 km
1.	Lausanne–Biel	La Neuveville–Biel/Bienne	3 Dec. 1860	OWB	–	Bernese section owned by the JBL and its predecessors	(16.78 km)
2.	Lausanne–Geneva	Lausanne–Renens	5 May 1856	OS	1872	Branched off the line to Biel in Renens	60.26 km
2.	Lausanne–Geneva	Renens–Denges-Échandens–Morges		OS	1872		60.26 km
2.	Lausanne–Geneva	Morges–Allaman	14 April 1858	OS	1868		60.26 km
2.	Lausanne–Geneva	Allaman–Gland	14 April 1858	OS	1872		60.26 km
2.	Lausanne–Geneva	Gland–Coppet	14 April 1858	OS	1868	Geneva section, Céligny–Céligny-canton border, was property of the GV	60.26 km
2.	Lausanne–Geneva	Coppet–Versoix (VD-GE canton border)	21 April 1858	OS	1868		60.26 km
2.	Lausanne–Geneva	Versoix–Geneva	25 June 1858	GV	1868	Already acquired from LFB on 1 July 1858	60.26 km
2.	Lausanne–Geneva	Denges-Echandes–Bussigny	5 May 1856	OS	–	Connecting loop, passenger traffic stopped in 1866, closed in 1879 (reactivated in 1971)	(6.54 km)
3.	Lausanne–Bern	Lausanne–Palézieux–Fribourg–Balliswil (near Düdingen)	4 Sept. 1862	LFB	–	Provisional Balliswil station at the north camp of the Grandfey Viaduct	86.88 km
3.	Lausanne–Bern	Balliswil–Thörishaus Station (FR-BE) canton border	2 July 1860	LFB	–		86.88 km
3.	Lausanne–Bern	Thörishaus Station–Bern	2 July 1860	SCB	–	Line owned by SCB	(8.98 km)
4.	Lausanne–Brig	Lausanne–Villeneuve	2 April 1861	OS	–		145.55 km
4.	Lausanne–Brig	Villeneuve–Bex	10 June 1857	OS	–		145.55 km
4.	Lausanne–Brig	Bex–Les Paluds (VD-VS canton border)	1 Nov. 1860	OS	–		145.55 km
4.	Lausanne–Brig	Les Paluds–Saint-Maurice–Martigny	14 July 1859	LI	–	Acquired by the SO on 28 June 1881	145.55 km
4.	Lausanne–Brig	Martigny–Sion	10 May 1860	LI	–	Acquired by the SO on 28 June 1881	145.55 km
4.	Lausanne–Brig	Sion–Sierre	15 Oct. 1868	LI	–	Acquired by the SO on 28 June 1881	145.55 km
4.	Lausanne–Brig	Sierre–Leuk	1 June 1877	S	–	Acquired by the SO on 28 June 1881	145.55 km
4.	Lausanne–Brig	Leuk–Brig	1 June 1878	S	–	Acquired by the SO on 28 June 1881	145.55 km
5.	(Saint-Maurice–) Les Paluds–Saint-Gingolph	Les Paluds–Bouveret	14 July 1859	LI	–	Acquired by the SO on 28 June 1881	25.52 km
5.	(Saint-Maurice–) Les Paluds–Saint-Gingolph	Bouveret–Saint-Gingolph–CH-F border	1 June 1886	SOS	–	Connected to the line to Évian-les-Bains of the PLM (closed in 1988)	25.52 km
6.	Neuchâtel–Pontarlier	Neuchâtel–Auvernier	7 Nov. 1859	FS	–	Branched off the line to Lausanne in Auvernier	41.07 km
6.	Neuchâtel–Pontarlier	Auvernier–CH-F border	25 July 1860	FS	–		41.07 km
6.	Neuchâtel–Pontarlier	Border–Pontarlier	25 July 1860	PLM	–	French section of line owned by the PLM	(11.28 km)
7.	(Lausanne–) Daillens–Vallorbe	Daillens–Vallorbe	1 July 1870	JE	–		29.34 km
7.	(Lausanne–) Daillens–Vallorbe	Vallorbe–CH-F border	1 July 1875	JE	–	Connection to line to Pontarlier of the PLM (closed in 1939)	29.34 km
8.	Palézieux–Kerzers (Broye longitudinal)	Palézieux–Payerne–Murten	25 Aug. 1876	SO	–		67.09 km
8.	Palézieux–Kerzers (Broye longitudinal)	Murten–Kerzers–Fräschels (FR-BE canton border)	12 June 1876	SO	–		67.09 km
8.	Palézieux–Kerzers (Broye longitudinal)	Fräschels–Lyss	12 June 1876	JBL	–	Fribourg–Ins railway	(12.97 km)
9.	Fribourg–Yverdon (Broye transversal)	Yverdon–Payerne	1 Febr. 1877	SO	–		49.92 km
9.	Fribourg–Yverdon (Broye transversal)	Payerne–Freiburg	25 Aug. 1876	SO	–		49.92 km
	Total (1889)				60.20 km (10 %)		580.67 km

== Rolling stock ==
In 1882, the company owned 105 locomotives, 331 passenger cars and 2022 freight cars.

From 1881, the SO designated their locomotives with Roman numerals: classes I and II consisted of locomotives with two drive axles, class III consisted of passenger locomotives with three drive axles and class IV consisted of freight locomotives with three drive axles. In rolling stock statistics, these class designations were partly used from 1873. The locomotives acquired from the Jougne–Eclépens Railway were named in the statistics as class V and the Simplon Company locomotives as class IV. The locomotives were designated according to the uniform system used throughout Switzerland from 1887.

This is a list of the locomotives used by the SO and the SOS. The designation of the class valid from 1902 is listed in brackets.

Class from 1873	Class from 1887	SO no.	SO/SOS no. from 1871	Name	JS no. from 1890	SBB no. from 1903 (Note: The SBB numbered the locomotives taken over after the completion of the boiler upgrades.)	Manufacturer	Build year	Scrapped	Image
I	A2T (B 2/3)	6–20	6–20	Taken over from the West Switzerland (see there) in 1872			Karlsruhe	1856–58	1888–1902	B 2/3
I from 1881: II	A2T (B 2/3)	21–25	1–5	Taken over from the West Switzerland (see there) in 1872			Cail	1858	1890–1892	
II	B2 (Ec 2/4)	1–12	51–62	Taken over from the Lausanne–Fribourg–Bern Railway (see there) in 1872			Esslingen	1862	1895–1895	Ec 2/4
II	A2T (B 2/3)	1'–3', 26–28	21–26	Various	74–79	1074–1079	Koechlin	1868/70	1904–1907	B 2/3
–	B2 (Ec 2/3)	–	63	Chambésy	263	6195 (Note: The locomotive was transferred to the Töss Valley Railway (TTB) as No. 7 in 1910 and after its nationalisation in 1918 was transferred to the SBB, where it was again designated as no. 6195.)	SACM	1888	1923	Ec 2/3
–	B2 (Ec 2/3)	–	64	Genthod	264	6196 (Note: The locomotive was transferred to the Martigny-Orsières Railway (MO) in 1909 as No. 1, to the Töss Valley Railway (TTB) in 1910 as No. 8 and after its nationalisation in 1918 was transferred to the SBB, where it was again designated as No. 6196 again.)	SACM	1888	1922	Ec 2/3
–	B2 (Ec 2/3)	–	65	Céligny	265	6197	SACM	1888	1909	Ec 2/3
–	B2 (Ec 2/3)	–	66	Crans	266	6198	SACM	1888	1909	Ec 2/3
–	B2 (Ec 2/3)	–	67	Myes	267	6199	SACM	1888	1909	Ec 2/3
III	B3T (C 3/3)	–	70 from 1874: 80	Valais	410	2410	Koechlin	1871	1906	C 3/3
III	B3T (C 3/3)	–	71	Lucerne	401	–	Koechlin	1871	1901	C 3/3
III	B3T (C 3/3)	–	72	Bâle	402	–	Koechlin	1871	1900	C 3/3
III	B3T (C 3/3)	–	73	Soleure	403	–	Koechlin	1871	1900	C 3/3
III	B3T (C 3/3)	–	74	Argovie	404	2407	Koechlin	1871	1909	C 3/3
III	B3T (C 3/3)	–	75	Zurich	405	2401	Koechlin	1871	1904	C 3/3
III	B3T (C 3/3)	–	76	St-Gall	406	2402	Koechlin	1872	1903	C 3/3
III	B3T (C 3/3)	–	77	Thurgovie	407	2408	Koechlin	1872	1906	C 3/3
III	B3T (C 3/3)	–	78	Schwytz	408	2406	Koechlin	1872	1904	C 3/3
III	B3T (C 3/3)	–	79	Tessin	409	2409	Koechlin	1872	1904	C 3/3
III	B3T (C 3/3)	–	81	Grisons	411	2414	Koechlin	1875	1904	C 3/3
III	B3T (C 3/3)	–	82	Appenzell	412	–	Koechlin	1875	1900	C 3/3
III	B3T (C 3/3)	–	83	Uri	413	2411	Koechlin	1875	1904	C 3/3
III	B3T (C 3/3)	–	84	Unterwald	414	2403	Koechlin	1875	1910	C 3/3
III	B3T (C 3/3)	–	85	Glaris	415	–	Koechlin	1875	1901	C 3/3
III	B3T (C 3/3)	–	86	Schaffhouse	416	2412	Koechlin	1875	1911	C 3/3
–	A3T (B 3/4)	–	91–94	–	201–204	1421–1424	SLM	1887	1917	B 3/4
IV	C3T (D 3/3)	51–55	101–105	Taken over from the West Switzerland (see there) in 1872			Cail	1858	from 1901	D 3/3
IV	C3T (D 3/3)	56	106	La Côte-aux-Fées	506	3364	PLM	1864 von SO	1913	B 2/3
IV	C3T (D 3/3)	57	107	Buttes	507	3370	PLM	1864 von SO	1907	B 2/3
IV	C3T (D 3/3)	58	108	Chaumont	508	3371	PLM	1864 von SO	1910	B 2/3
IV	C3T (D 3/3)	59	109	La Reuse	509	3372	Creusot	1865 von FS	1911	
IV	C3T (D 3/3)	60	110	La Thielle	510	3373	Creusot	1865 von FS	1914	
IV	C3T (D 3/3)	61	111	La Concorde	511	3374	Creusot	1865 von FS	1909	
IV	C3T (D 3/3)	62	112	Broye	512	3375	Koechlin	1865	1914	D 3/3
IV	C3T (D 3/3)	63	113	Venoge	513	3352	Koechlin	1865	1924	D 3/3
IV	C3T (D 3/3)	64	114	Rhône	514	–	Koechlin	1870	1897	D 3/3
IV	C3T (D 3/3)	65	115	Léman	515	3376	Koechlin	1870	1925	D 3/3
IV	C3T (D 3/3)	66	116	Versoix	516	3377	Koechlin	1871	1906	D 3/3
IV	C3T (D 3/3)	67	117	Aar	517	3378	Koechlin	1871	1912	D 3/3
IV	C3T (D 3/3)	68	118	Avançon	518	3353	Koechlin	1871	1912	D 3/3
IV	C3T (D 3/3)	69	119	Gérine	519	3390	Koechlin	1871	1904	D 3/3
IV	C3T (D 3/3)	–	120	Mont Cenis	520	3379	Koechlin	1871	1911	
IV	C3T (D 3/3)	–	121	Culoz	521	3365	Koechlin	1871	1912	
IV	C3T (D 3/3)	–	122	Turin	522	3380	Koechlin	1871	1907	
IV	C3T (D 3/3)	–	123	Gênes	523	3381	Koechlin	1871	1910	
IV	C3T (D 3/3)	–	124	Florence	524	3389	Koechlin	1871	1909	
IV	C3T (D 3/3)	–	125	Milan	525	3354	Koechlin	1871	1910	
IV	C3T (D 3/3)	–	126	Suze	526	3382	Koechlin	1872	1921	
IV	C3T (D 3/3)	–	127	Italie	527	3355	Koechlin	1872	1909	
IV	C3T (D 3/3)	–	128	Mulhouse	528	3366	Koechlin	1872	1915	
IV	C3T (D 3/3)	–	129	Strasbourg	529	3383	Koechlin	1872	1916	
IV	C3T (D 3/3)	–	130	Mannheim	530	–	Koechlin	1872	1901	
IV	C3T (D 3/3)	–	131	Cologne	531	3391	Koechlin	1872	1906	
IV	C3T (D 3/3)	–	132	Anvers	532	3356	Koechlin	1872	1908	
IV	C3T (D 3/3)	–	133	Rhin	533	3357	Koechlin	1872	1924	
IV	C3T (D 3/3)	–	134	Francfort	534	3367	Koechlin	1872	1903	
IV	C3T (D 3/3)	–	135	Verrières	535	3384	Koechlin	1872	1912	
IV	C3T (D 3/3)	–	136	Moudon	536	3385	SACM	1874	1925	
IV	C3T (D 3/3)	–	137	Payerne	537	3386	SACM	1874	1913	
IV	C3T (D 3/3)	–	138	Avenches	538	3358	SACM	1874	1910	
IV	C3T (D 3/3)	–	139	Estavayer	539	3359	SACM	1874	1912	
SO V	B3T (C 3/3)	–	87–89	Taken over from the Jougne–Eclépens Railway (see there) in 1876			Koechlin	1869	1898–1909	
SO VI from 1881: I	A2T (B 2/3)	–	41–46	Taken over from the Compagnie du Simplon (see there) in 1881			Fives	1858	1892–1896	B 2/3
SO VI from 1881: II	A2T (B 2/3)	–	27–29	Taken over from the Compagnie du Simplon (see there) in 1881			SACM	1875	1903	
–	E3 (E 3/3)	–	201–202	Acquired from the Pont–Vallorbe Railway (see there) for operation on its line			SACM	1886	1948, 1924	E 3/3

During shortages of rolling stock—especially during the Franco-Prussian War period—the SO responded by renting mostly French locomotives.
