= Jougne-Eclépens Railway =

The Jougne-Eclépens Railway (Chemin de fer de Jougne à Eclépens, JE) was a railway company in Switzerland and existed from 1870 to 1876.

== History ==
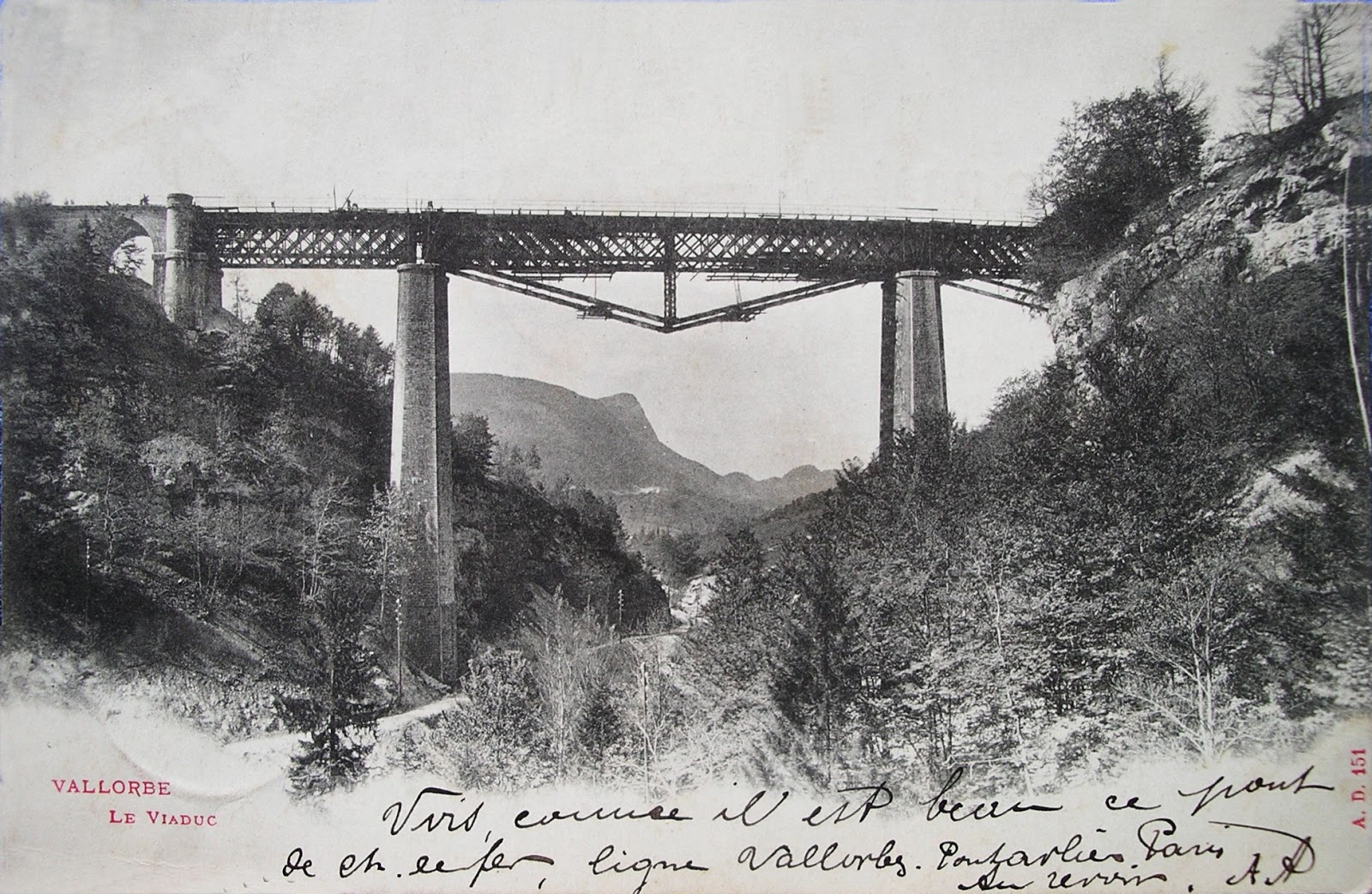
Le Day Viaduct near Vallorbe

The Jougne–Eclépens opened a railway from a junction with the Jura Foot Railway of the West Switzerland Company (Compagnie de l'Ouest Suisse) at Daillens (near Eclépens) to Vallorbe on the Swiss border on 1 July 1870 and its extension from Vallorbe to Jougne in France on 1 July 1875. The continuation of the line to Pontarlier was owned by the Chemins de fer de Paris à Lyon et à la Méditerranée (PLM).

The route of the JE, together with the Simplon Railway, which then ended in the Valais, is the shortest transit route from Paris to Italy. Until the Simplon Tunnel was built, it offered no advantage over the Paris–Lyon–Geneva and Pontarlier–Les Verrieres–Neuchâtel lines. The regional traffic in the sparsely populated area was low and the JE collected too little income.

In 1872, the Western Switzerland Railways (Chemins de fer de la Suisse Occidentale, SO) acquired a significant stake in JE to prevent it from being taken over by its competitors as a result of its continuing financial problems. The SO took over the bankrupt company completely on 20 December 1876.

The section from Vallorbe to Jougne was closed on 19 April 1939 and it was dismantled in 1942 because the tunnel at Jougne had been blown up in the Second World War.

== Rolling stock ==
The following is a list of locomotives used by the JE:

Class	JE no.	Name	SO/SOS no. ab 1876	JS no. from 1890	SBB no. from 1903	Manufacturer	Build year	Scrapped
A from 1874: (SO) V from 1887: B3T from 1902: C 3/3	1	La Sarraz	87	417	–	Koechlin	1869	1898
A from 1874: (SO) V from 1887: B3T from 1902: C 3/3	2	Romainmôtier	88	418	2413	Koechlin	1869	1903
A from 1874: (SO) V from 1887: B3T from 1902: C 3/3	3	Vallorbe	89	419	2404	Koechlin	1869	1909
