= West Switzerland Company =

West Switzerland Railway

Overview
- Native name: Ouest Suisse (OS)

The West Switzerland Company (French: Compagnie de l'Ouest-Suisse, OS) was a railway company in Switzerland, formed 1854 and absorbed into the Western Swiss Railway in 1872. The OS built a railway network in western Switzerland and connected with France via Geneva in 1858, although Switzerland's first railway was the French Strasbourg–Basel Railway (French: Chemin de fer de Strasbourg à Bâle), which connected Basel with Strasbourg, France in 1844.

== History ==
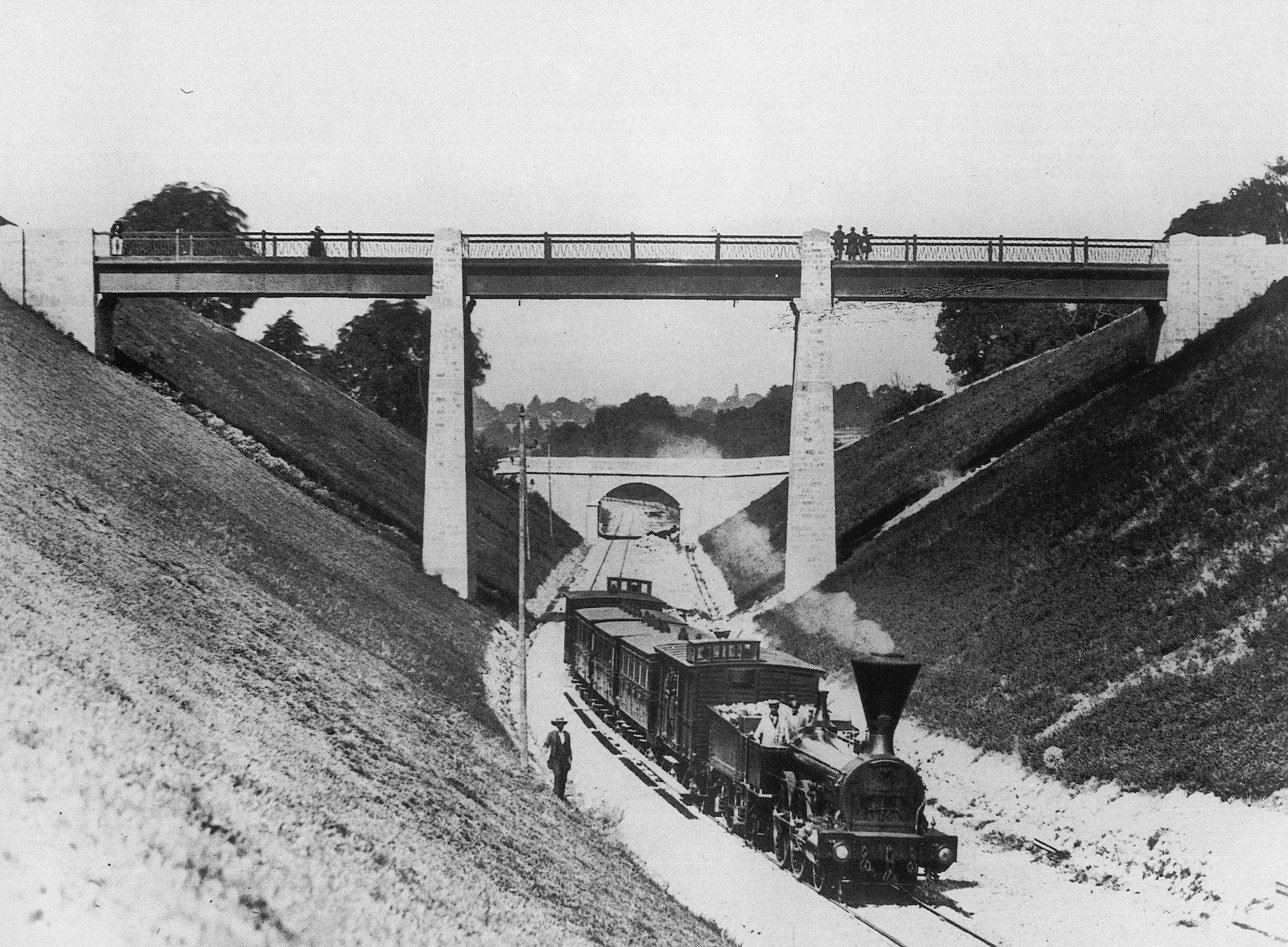
West Switzerland train between Lausanne and Renens, shortly after the opening of the line in 1856.

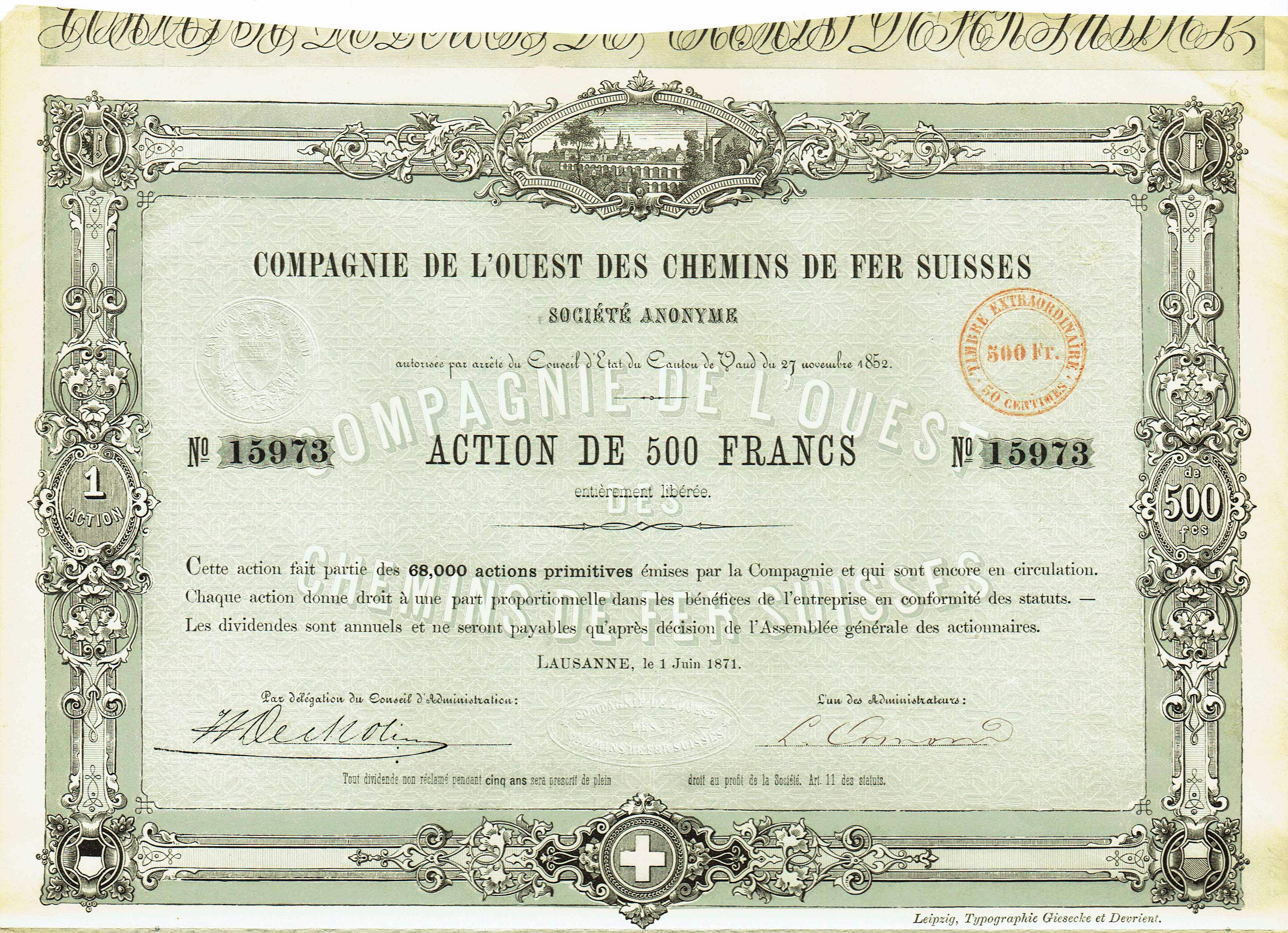
Share of the West Switzerland

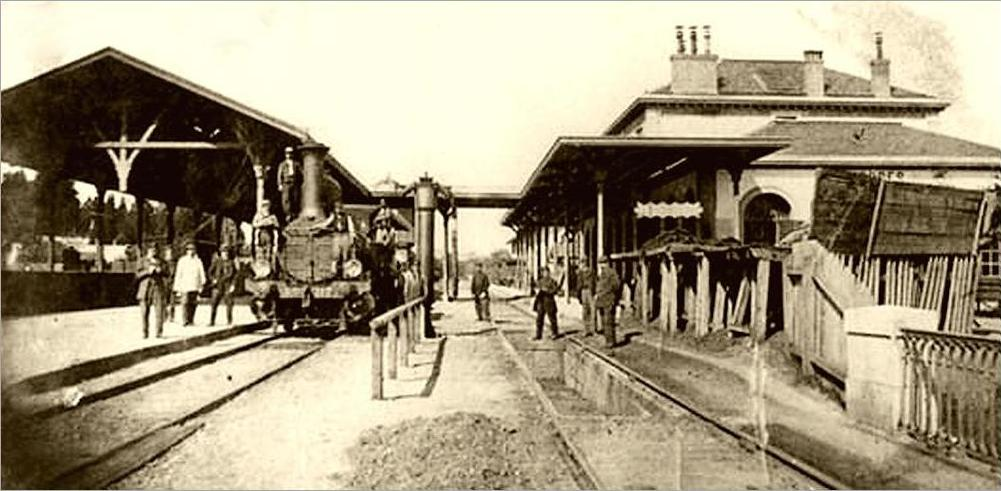
Morges station with a waiting West Switzerland train

In 1854, the Company of West Switzerland gained a concession from the canton of Vaud for the construction of a railway line from Lausanne to Yverdon, with a proposal to continue via Payerne and Murten to Bern. The extension of the route past Yverdon was delayed by the Oron rail dispute (German: Oronbahnkonfliktes)—a dispute between the canton of Fribourg and Vaud over the route of the railway between Bern and Lausanne. Fribourg sought a route that passed through the city of Fribourg rather than along a flatter and cheaper alignment further west and was able to delay the railway because the route through Payerne and Murten had to pass through the canton of Fribourg. A route through Fribourg was finally agreed in 1857.

In May 1855, it opened the line from Bussigny-près-Lausanne to Yverdon and on 1 July 1855 from Bussigny to Morges via Renens as part of the Jura foot line. On 5 May 1856, the company opened two new sections, Renens to Lausanne and the connecting curve from Morges to Bussigny. On 10 June 1857 a section from Villeneuve at the western end of Lake Geneva to Bex in the Rhone Valley opened. The link between Lausanne and Villeneuve was operated by boat until 1861. On 7 November 1859, the section from Yverdon to Vaumarcus was opened, connecting the OS was to the network of the Franco-Swiss (Franco-Suisse, FS).

In order to establish a rail connection to the French Paris–Lyon–Mediterranean Railway, the OS opened a line from Morges to Coppet on 14 April 1858 and a line from Coppet to Versoix on the following 21 April. On 25 June 1858 the OS connected with Geneva with the opening of the Versoix–Geneva route of the Geneva–Versoix Railway (Chemin de fer Genève–Versoix, GM). 6 days later in the Lausanne–Friborg–Bern Railway (LFB) was established; it completed a connection to Bern and central Switzerland on 4 September 1862.

On 1 November 1860 the line from Bex to Les Paluds near St Maurice was connected to the Ligne d'italie (LI) line from Le Bouveret to Martigny, part of its ambition to build a line to the Simplon Pass. The gap on the shores of Lake Geneva from Lausanne to Villeneuve was closed on 2 April 1861.

=== Western Swiss Railways ===
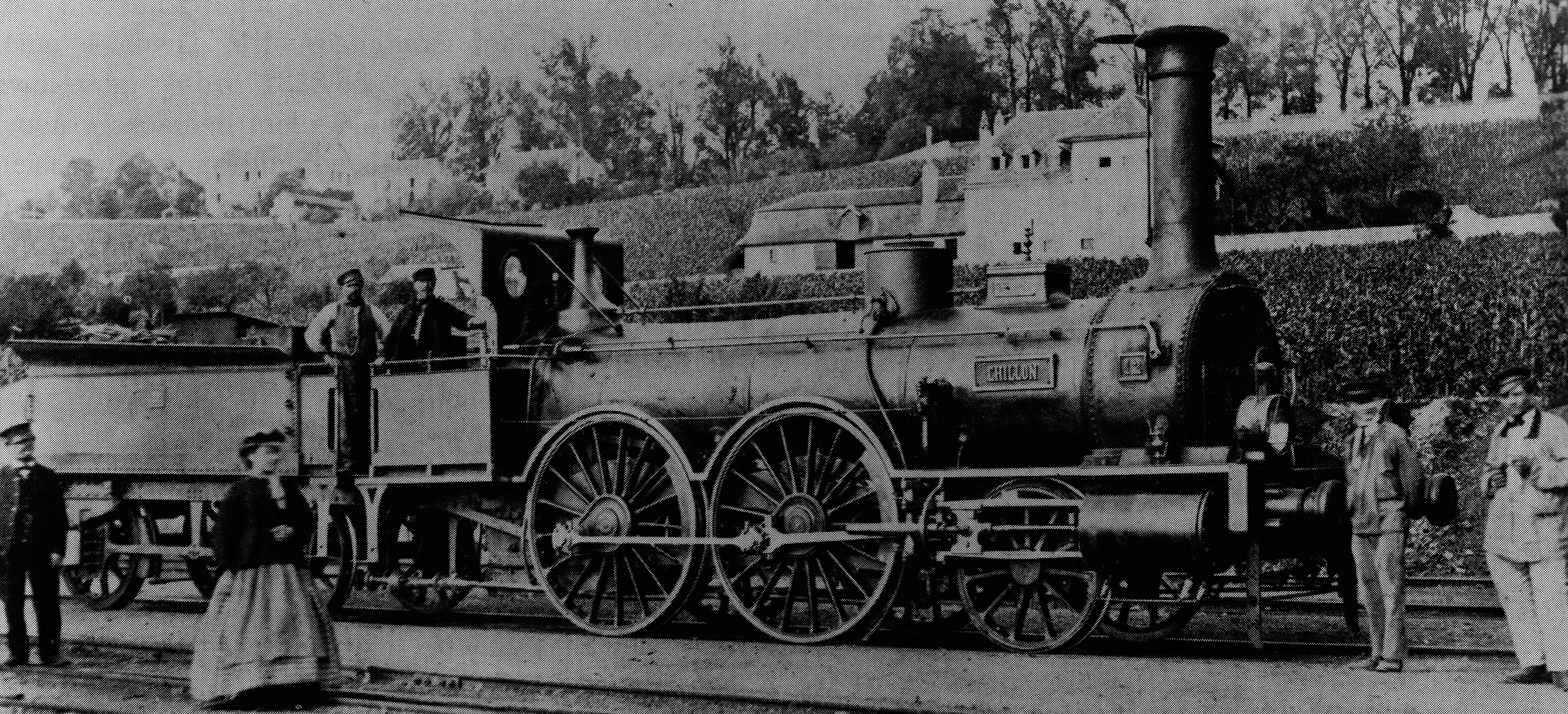
Locomotive No. 12 of the OS, built in 1857

The connection from Geneva via Lausanne to Neuchâtel was owned by three competing railway companies, which were often in conflict. The Lausanne–Fribourg–Bern Railway (Chemin de fer Lausanne–Fribourg–Berne, LFB) owned the short section from Geneva to Versoix, the line from Versoix to Vaumarcus belonged to the OS and the continuation to Neuchâtel was owned by Franco-Suisse. Because of their financial difficulties, the three western Swiss railways established a joint business called the Association des chemins de fer de la Suisse Occidentale (association of the railways of western Switzerland) on 1 January 1865 after lengthy negotiations. Their operations were contracted out to a company called Laurent-Bergeron et Comp. The financial situation of the three Western Swiss railway companies then stabilised and from 1868 onwards the companies were able to pay modest dividends each year.

On 1 January 1872, the Western Switzerland Railways (Suisse-Occidentale, SO) was established as a public limited company, in which the Western Switzerland was fully integrated with the LFB and the FS. It became Switzerland's largest railway company, with a network that was 315 kilometres long.

== Rolling stock ==
The following is a list of locomotives used on the OS:

Class	OS no.	Name	SO no. from 1865	SO/SOS no. from 1871	JS no. from 1890	SBB no. from 1903	Manufacturer	Build year	Scrapped	Remarks	Image
– (B 2/3)	1–5 (26–30)	OS B 2/3 (St. Léonard)	–	–	–	–	St. Léonard	1854	1864		
from 1881: IV from 1887: C3T from 1902: D 3/3	1'	La Vaux	51	101	501	3351	Cail	1858		to Germany in 1916	D 3/3
from 1881: IV from 1887: C3T from 1902: D 3/3	2'	La Côte	52	102	502	3699	Cail	1858	1913	see below	D 3/3
from 1881: IV from 1887: C3T from 1902: D 3/3	3'	L´Yvorne	53	103	503	–	Cail	1858	1901		D 3/3
from 1881: IV from 1887: C3T from 1902: D 3/3	4'	L´Industrie	54	104	504	3368	Cail	1858	1910		D 3/3
from 1881: IV from 1887: C3T from 1902: D 3/3	5'	L´Agriculture	55	105	505	3369	Cail	1858	1913		D 3/3
from 1873: I from 1887: A2T from 1902: B 2/3	6–20	OS B 2/3 (Karlsruhe)	6–20	6–20	51–62, 801	–	Karlsruhe	1856–58	1888–1902		B 2/3
from 1873: I from 1881: II from 1887: A2T from 1902: B 2/3	21–25	OS B 2/3 (Cail)	21–25	1–5	69–73	–	Cail	1858	1890–1892		

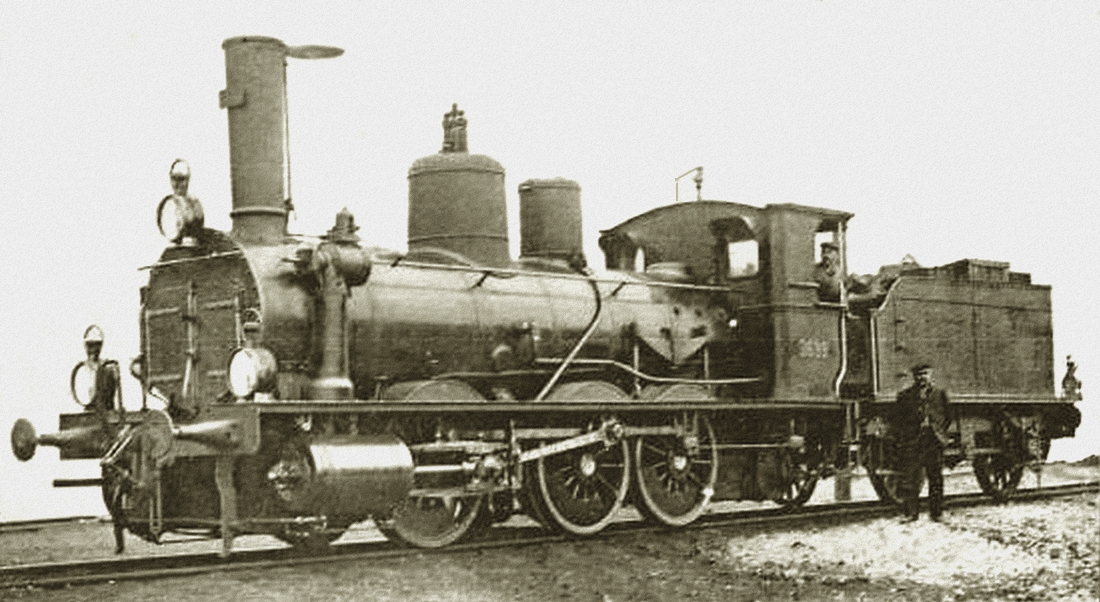
The D 3/3 No. 503 was the first compound steam locomotive in Switzerland.

The D 3/3 Nr. 502 was completely rebuilt in 1888 by the SOS in the workshop Yverdon as the only machine in the series. It received a new boiler and was equipped as the first locomotive in Switzerland with compound drive. The open driving position, which was protected by a small screen only, was replaced by a cab.
