= Franco-Swiss Company =

Former railway company in Switzerland

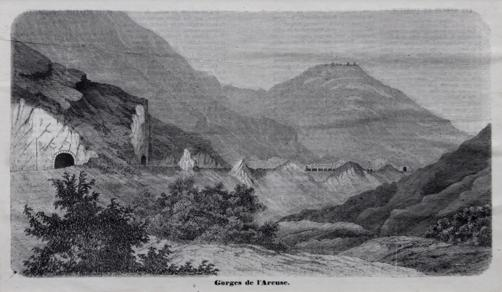
- Areuse Gorge with Franco-Swiss line on a wood engraving

The Franco-Swiss Company (French: Compagnie Franco-Suisse, FS) was a former railway company in Switzerland, formed in 1859 and absorbed into the Western Swiss Railways in 1872. It built the Neuchâtel-Pontarlier railway.

== History ==
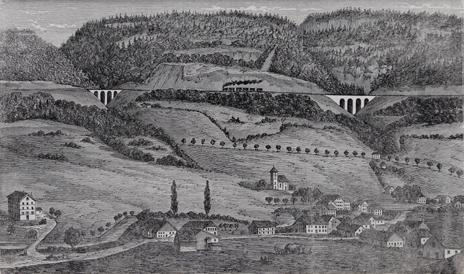
Contemporary illustration of the Neuchâtel-Les Verrières line above the village of Saint-Sulpice

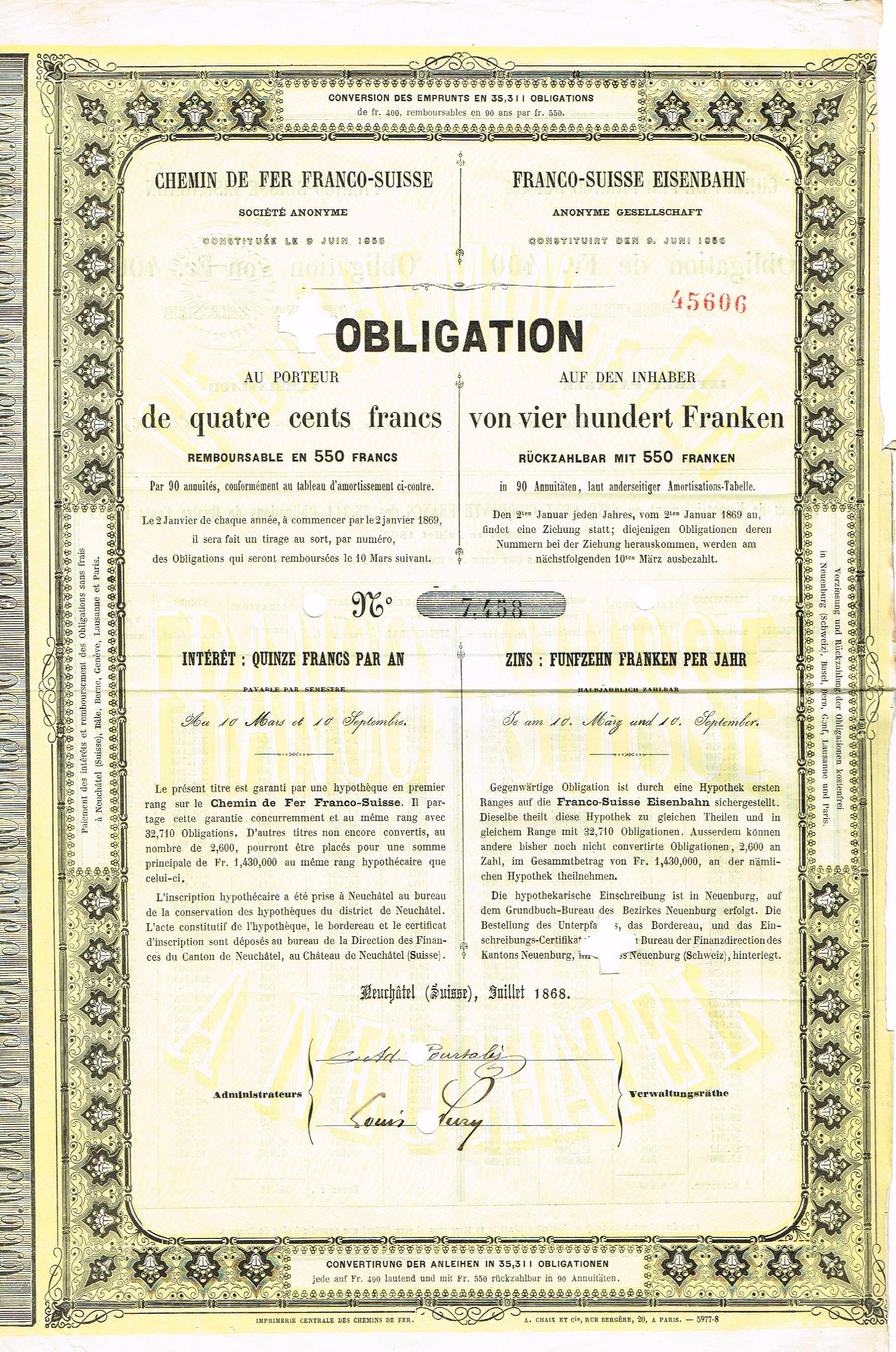
Bond of the Franco-Suisse Eisenbahn company, issued July 1868

The French company, Paris–Lyon–Mediterranean Railway (PLM) sought to connect its network with the Swiss network. To achieve this, it founded in 1856 with other investors the Franco–Swiss Company, and subscribed 40% of the capital for the construction of a railway line from Pontarlier in France to the Swiss border at Les Verrières through the Val-de-Travers to Neuchâtel.

On 7 November 1859 the company opened a line from Vaumarcus (extending the West Switzerland Company's line from Yverdon-les-Bains) to the village of Frienisberg, near Le Landeron on Lake Biel, part of what is now called the Jura Foot Railway. A temporary station was established at a pier in Frienisberg for a link by boat across Lake Biel to Nidau near Biel, which was served by trains of the Swiss Central Railway on its section of the Jura foot line from Olten via Herzogenbuchsee.

On 25 July 1860, the line (now the Neuchâtel-Pontarlier railway) from Auvernier on the Jura Foot Railway to Les Verrières on the Swiss border opened, connecting with the Frasne–Les Verrières line of the PLM. The construction of the line proved quite difficult, requiring numerous engineering works. In order to achieve a maximum gradient of 2% between Auvernier and the crest at Les Bayards the line had many cuttings and tunnels. Four lives were lost in the work.

PLM rollingstock was originally used on both routes; soon international trains operated from Paris to Neuchâtel via Les Verrières.

The line was not profitable as its rival, the Swiss Central Railway carried most traffic between Switzerland and France over the border at Basel.

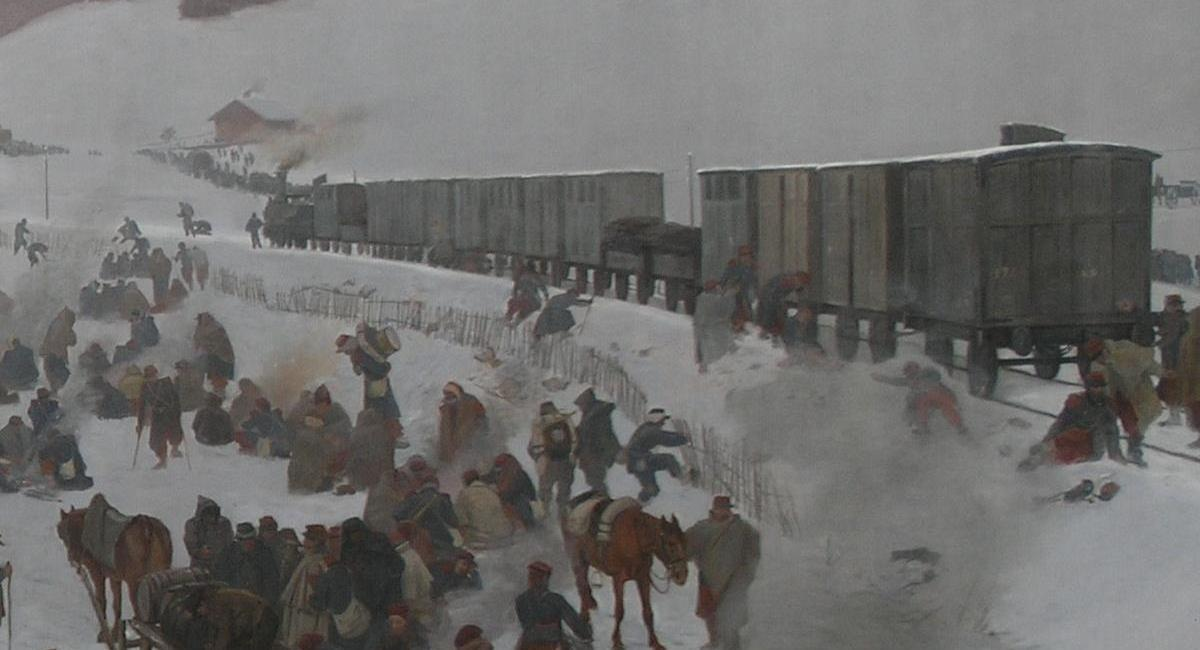
Medical train in Les Verrières for the wounded of the Bourbaki army during the Franco-Prussian War of 1870/71. Detail of the giant round painting by Edouard Castres in the Bourbaki Panorama in Lucerne.

The railway played an important role in the Franco-Prussian War, when during January and February 1871, the French Armée de l'Est with 87,000 men under General Bourbaki retreated into Switzerland and were disarmed and interned in Les Verrières. On 22 March when the interned troops were released and were being repatriated by train a collision occurred due to an incorrect setting of points. The driver and 22 internees were killed and 72 soldiers were injured, some seriously.

On 1 January 1872, the Western Swiss Railway (French: Chemins de Fer de la Suisse Occidentale, SO) was formed out of a merger of the Franco–Swiss Company with the West Switzerland Company (Compagnie de l'Ouest-Suisse, OS) and the Lausanne–Fribourg–Bern Railway (Chemin de Fer Lausanne-Bern-Fribourg, LFB).

== Rolling stock ==
Since operations were run first by the PLM and then from 1 January 1865 by an operating arrangement of FS, OS and LFB called the "Association des chemins de fer de la Suisse Occidentale", Franco-Swiss did not have its own rolling stock.
