= Lausanne–Fribourg–Bern Railway =

Lausanne-Bern-Fribourg Railway
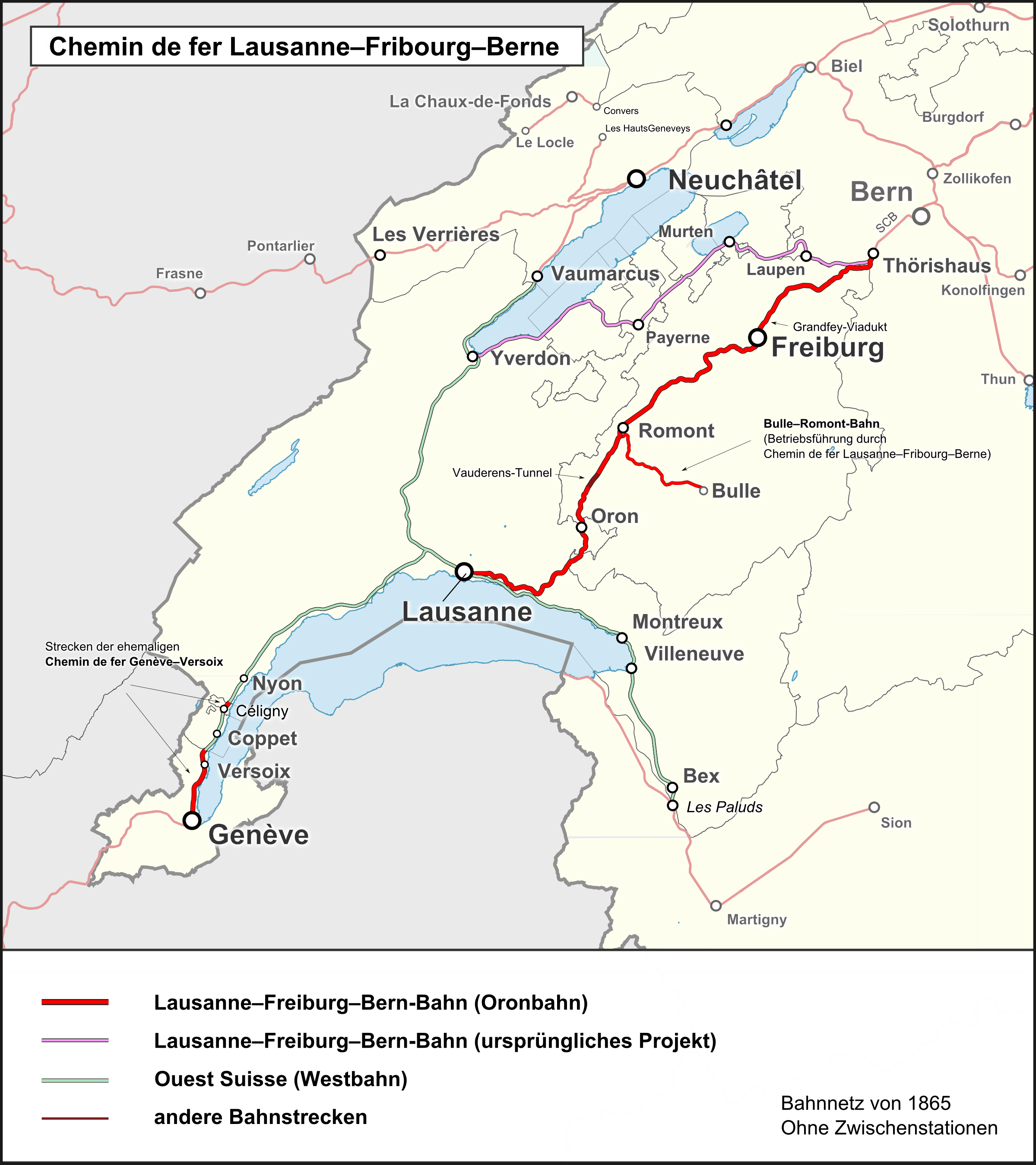

Overview
- Native name: Chemin de fer Lausanne–Fribourg–Berne (LFB)

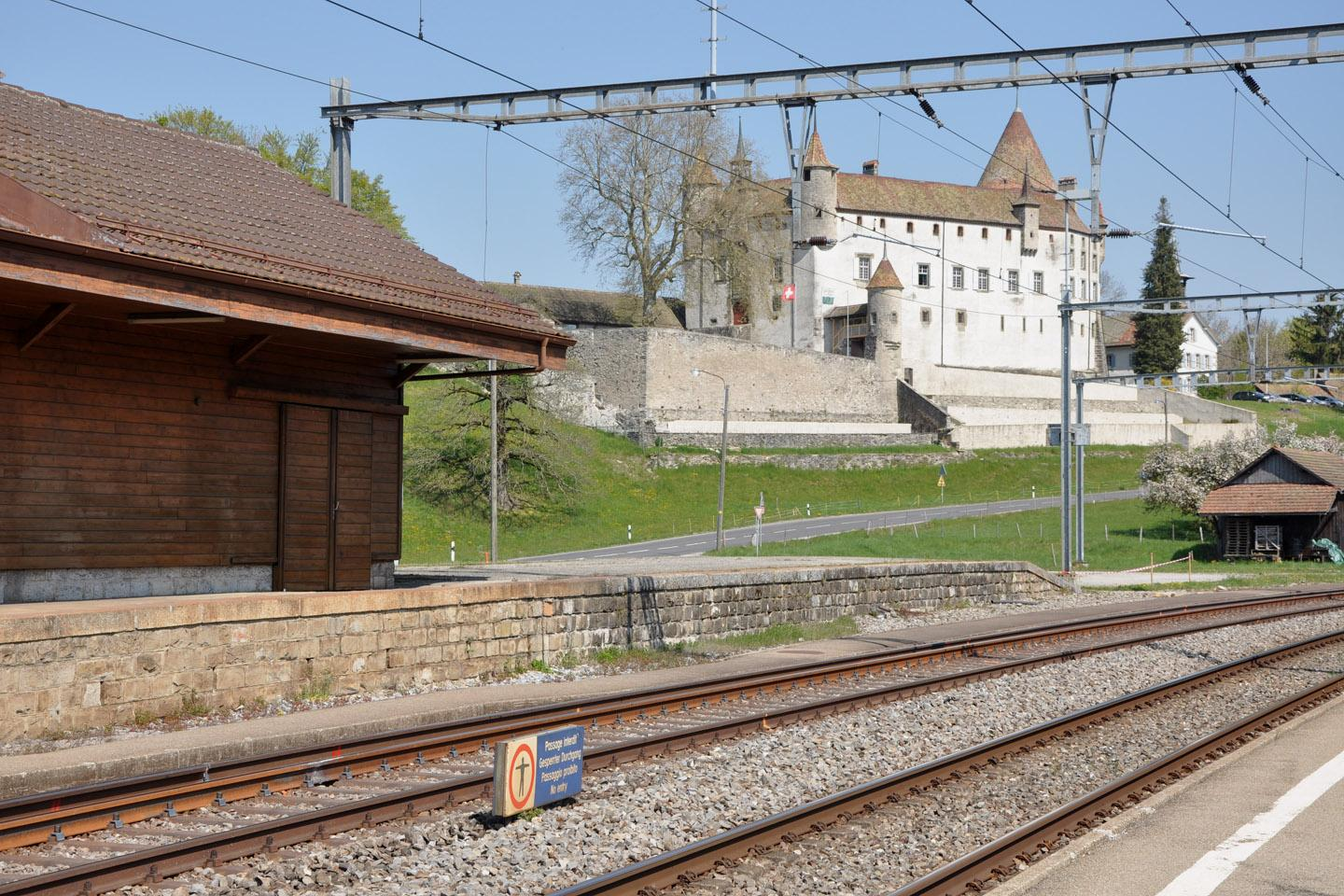
View of Oron castle from Oron station. The town gave its name to the conflict over the route of the Bern–Lausanne railway.

The Lausanne-Bern-Fribourg Railway (French: Chemin de Fer Lausanne-Bern-Fribourg, LFB) was a former railway company in Switzerland, which was formed in 1858 and absorbed into the Western Swiss Railway in 1872.

The aim of the LFB was to connect the French-speaking part of western Switzerland with the German-speaking part of central Switzerland with a line from Lausanne to Bern via Oron and Fribourg. The line now forms part of the Lausanne–Bern railway, now owned by the Swiss Federal Railways.

== History ==
=== Oron Railway Conflict ===
The aim of the LFB was to connect the western and French-speaking part of Switzerland with the central and German-speaking part of Switzerland with a line from Lausanne to Bern via Oron and Fribourg. The line now forms the Lausanne–Bern railway. However, it was preceded by a long history of dispute over the selection of the route between various canton interests between 1852 and 1857, known in German as the Oronbahnkonflikt (Oron railway conflict).

The cantons of Bern, Fribourg, Vaud and Geneva agreed on a rail link between Geneva and Bern in 1852. This line was to run from Bern to Geneva via Laupen, Murten, Payerne, Yverdon and Lausanne. Immediately thereafter, the West Switzerland Company (Compagnie de l'Ouest Suisse, OS) received the concession for its section through the Vaud.

The canton of Fribourg, however, wanted to benefit from the line and finally insisted that the line would have to run via Fribourg instead of via Laupen. The West Switzerland did not agree and insisted on the route via Murten and called on the Federal Assembly to issue a "compulsory" concession, overriding Fribourg. (Note: According to the Railway Act of 1852, the right to make concessions lay basically with the cantons. However, the Confederation had the right to issue compulsory concessions if it was in the interest of the whole country.)

The Fribourg Grand Council decided on 27 November 1855 to build a railway line at public expense from Yverdon via Payerne-Freiburg to Thörishaus on the border with the canton of Bern at the request of Julien Schaller. The concession was to be issued to a start-up company called the Chemin de fer du canton de Fribourg ou du Centre Ouest Suisse (Canton of Fribourg or Central West Switzerland Railway). The Federal Assembly decided on 6 February 1856 in favour of Fribourg and the canton issued a concession to its company. Shortly later, Fribourg changed its plans and sought the construction of a direct route via Oron, which was about 26 km shorter, and issued a concession for it on 24 May 1856 to the Lyon-Geneva Railway (Chemin de fer Lyon-Genève). (Note: The Geneva–Lyon Railway merged in 1857 with the Chemins de fer de Paris à Lyon et à la Méditerranée (PLM).)

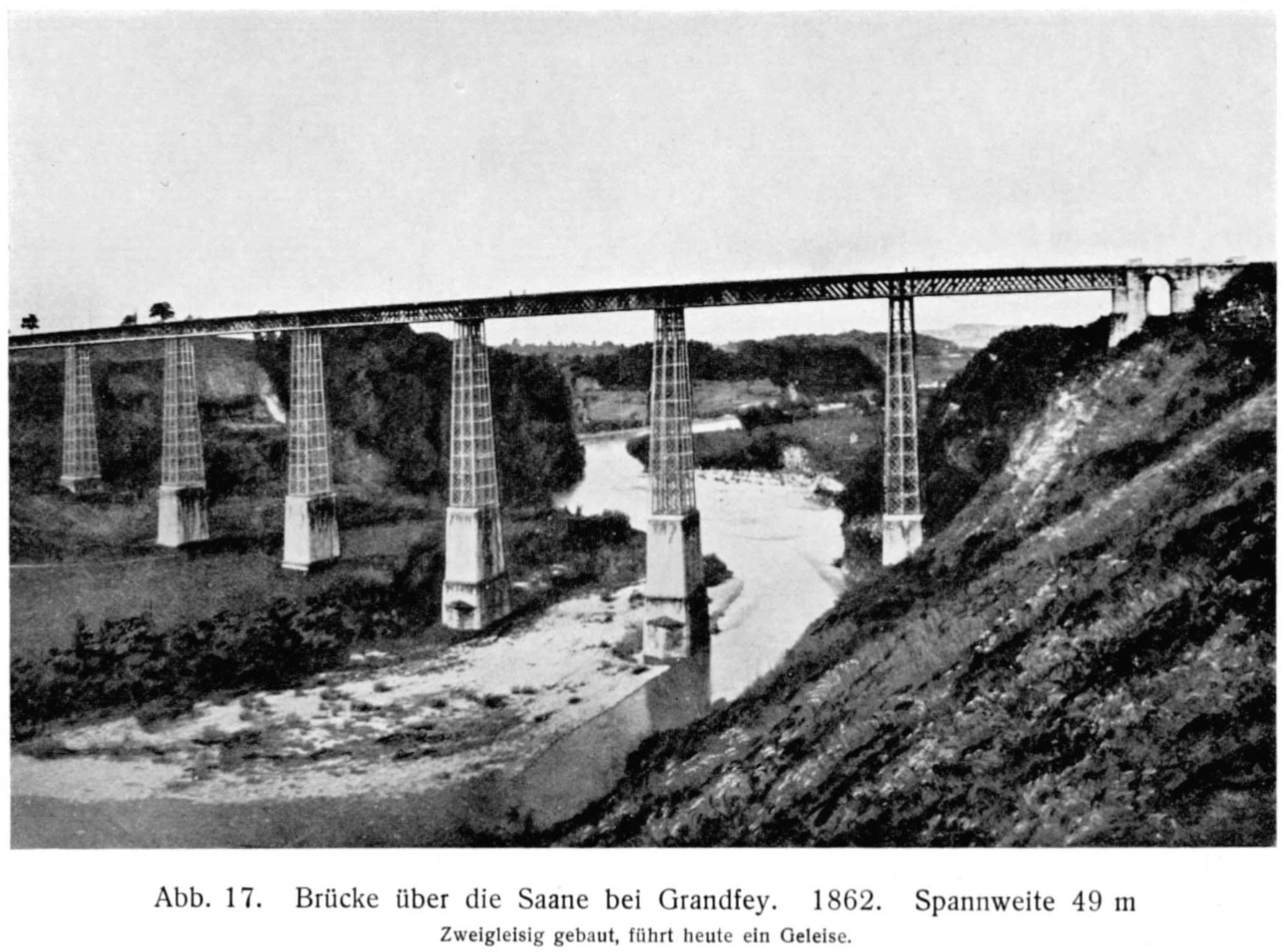
Grandfey Viaduct over the Saane in about 1862

Lausanne, on the other hand, returned to the Federal Assembly and applied for a compulsory concession for the line via Murten. The Federal Council then consulted foreign experts, who recommended against the Oron line because of the considerable technical difficulties and higher development costs. Nevertheless, after violent debates on 23 September 1856, the Federal Assembly supported in principle the direct route via Oron.

Lausanne did not want to take part in negotiations proposed by the Federal Assembly, so the Confederation issued a compulsory concession for the construction of the line on Vaud soil to Fribourg. Vaud, on the other hand, sought a compulsory concession for the Murten line, but was rejected by the Federal Council on 31 July 1857. Vaud then objected to the federal decision and claimed the Federal Council had a conflict of competence. Finally, the unified Federal Assembly rejected the claim that it had a conflict of competence on 19 December 1857 and found that the national interest was greater for a line via Oron than a line via Murten.

=== Establishment of the company ===
The Oron Railway was able to acquire the concession for the Geneva–Versoix line from the Lyon-Geneva Railway (Chemin de fer Lyon-Genève) on 16 April 1858. It took over the Geneva–Versoix Railway (Chemin de fer Genève–Versoix, GV) on 1 July 1858—just six days after its opening. It was able to open the section from Thörishaus on the Bern–Fribourg canton border to Balliswil near Düdingen on 2 July 1860. A makeshift station was built near the northern abutment of the Grandfey Viaduct in the hamlet of Balliswil near Fribourg. The Bern–Törishaus section opened on the same day is located in the canton of Bern and belonged to the Swiss Central Railway (Schweizerische Centralbahn, SCB).

The LFB was able to open the remaining section from Lausanne to Balliswil on 4 September 1862 and thus accommodate through rail traffic between Bern and Lausanne. Financial difficulties, which arose during the construction of the Oron Railway, caused the LFB to transfer its line to the canton of Friborg on 12 November 1863. The canton of Vaud approved the transfer on 24 November 1866 and the canton of Geneva approved it on 9 May 1869.

The Lausanne-Bern-Fribourg Railway opened double-track between Versoix and Geneva in 1868. In the same year, the West Switzerland (Ouest Suisse) completed the second track from Gland to Versoix.

=== Association of the Railways of Western Switzerland ===
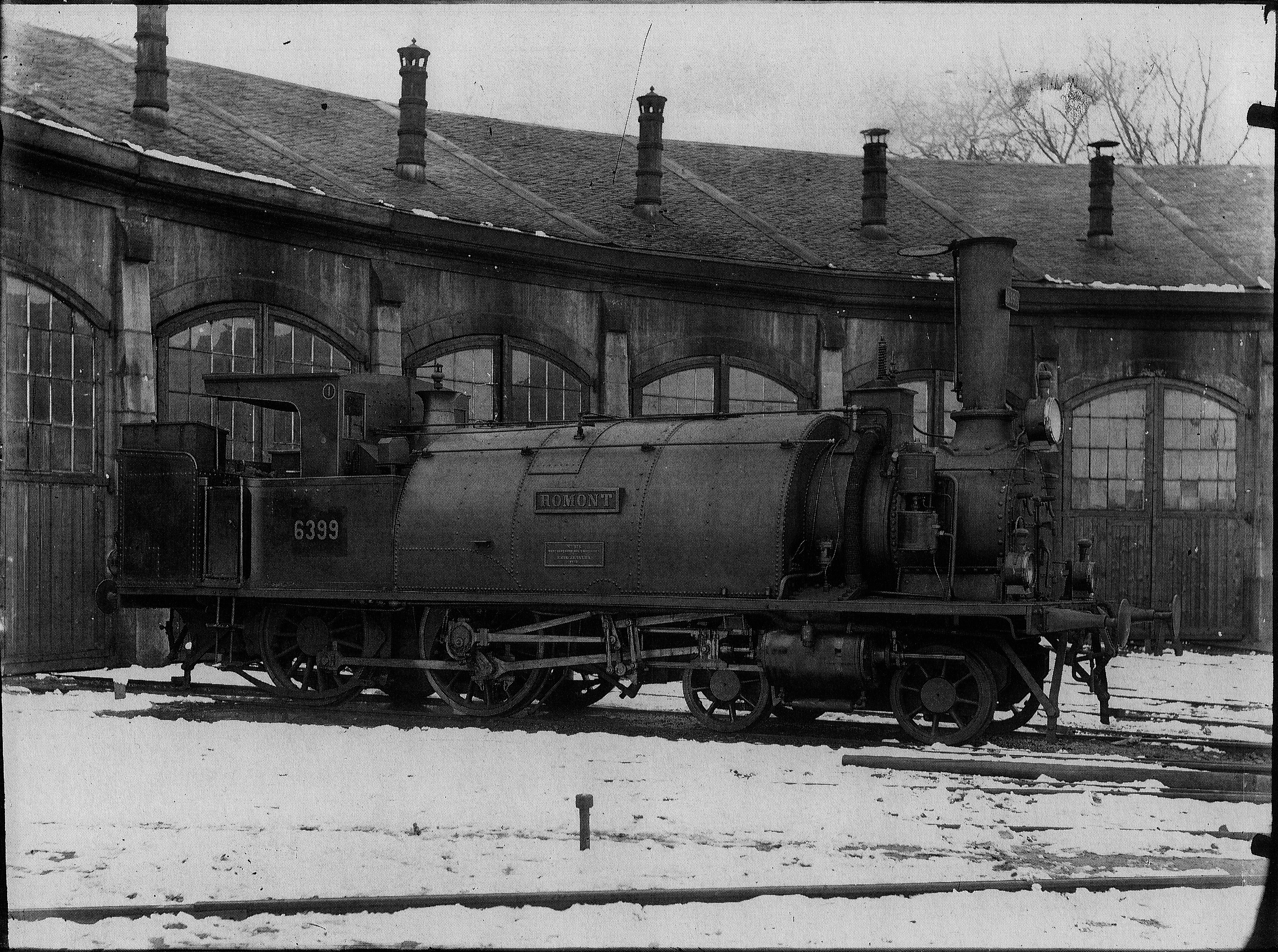
Locomotive no. 6399 Romont of the SBB, originally no. 4 of the LFB.

The connection from Geneva via Lausanne to German-speaking Switzerland was in the hands of three rail companies, which were often very competitive. Their ownership was largely based on cantonal borders. Like the LFB, the West Switzerland Company (Compagnie de l’Ouest Suisse; SO) and the Franco-Swiss Company (Franco-Suisse, FS) in the canton of Neuchâtel faced financial difficulties, which also stem from cost overruns in the construction work. The three railway companies formed a joint business called the Association des chemins de fer de la Suisse Occidentale (association of the railways of western Switzerland) on 1 January 1865 after lengthy negotiations. Their operations were contracted out to a company called Laurent-Bergeron et Comp. The financial situation of the three Western Swiss railway companies then stabilised and from 1868 onwards the companies were able to pay modest dividends each year.

On 1 January 1872, the Western Switzerland Railways (Suisse-Occidentale, SO) was established as a public limited company, in which the Oron Railway was fully integrated with the Western Switzerland and the Franco-Swiss. It became Switzerland's largest railway company, with a network that was 315 kilometres long.

== Rolling stock ==
The following is a list of locomotives used on the LFB:

Class	LFB no.	SO no. from 1865	SO/SOS no. from 1871	JS no. from 1890	SBB no. from 1903	Manufacturer	Build year	Scrapped
from 1873: II from 1887: B2 from 1902: Ec 2/4	1–12	1–12	51–62	251–262	6398, 6399	Esslingen	1862	1895–1905
