= Compagnie de la Ligne d'Italie =

Defunct Swiss railway company

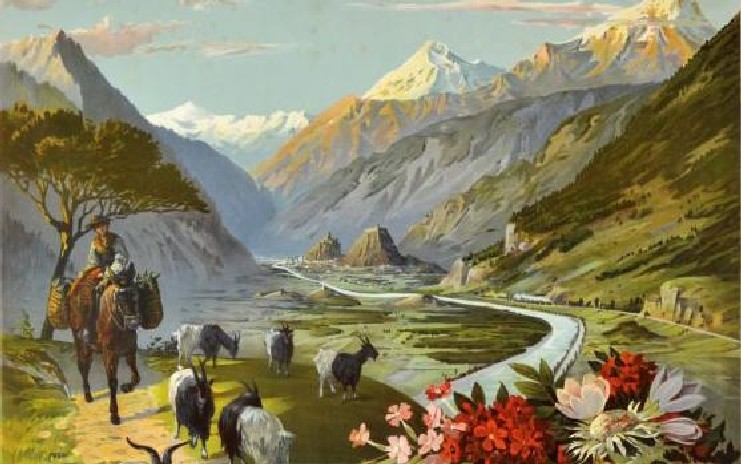
The line built by the Ligne d’Italie in the Rhone valley near Sion. Detail from a poster by Hugo d’Alési (1849–1906)

The Compagnie de la Ligne d’Italie (Railway of Italy Company, LdI), or Ligne d’Italie for short, was a former Swiss railway company that established in 1859. In 1874, the Ligne d'Italie became part of the Compagnie du Simplon (Simplon Company, S). The Compagnie du Simplon, Ligne du Simplon or Simplon for short, merged into the Western Swiss Railways (Chemins de fer de la Suisse Occidentale, SO) in 1881.

== History ==
=== Ligne d’Italie ===
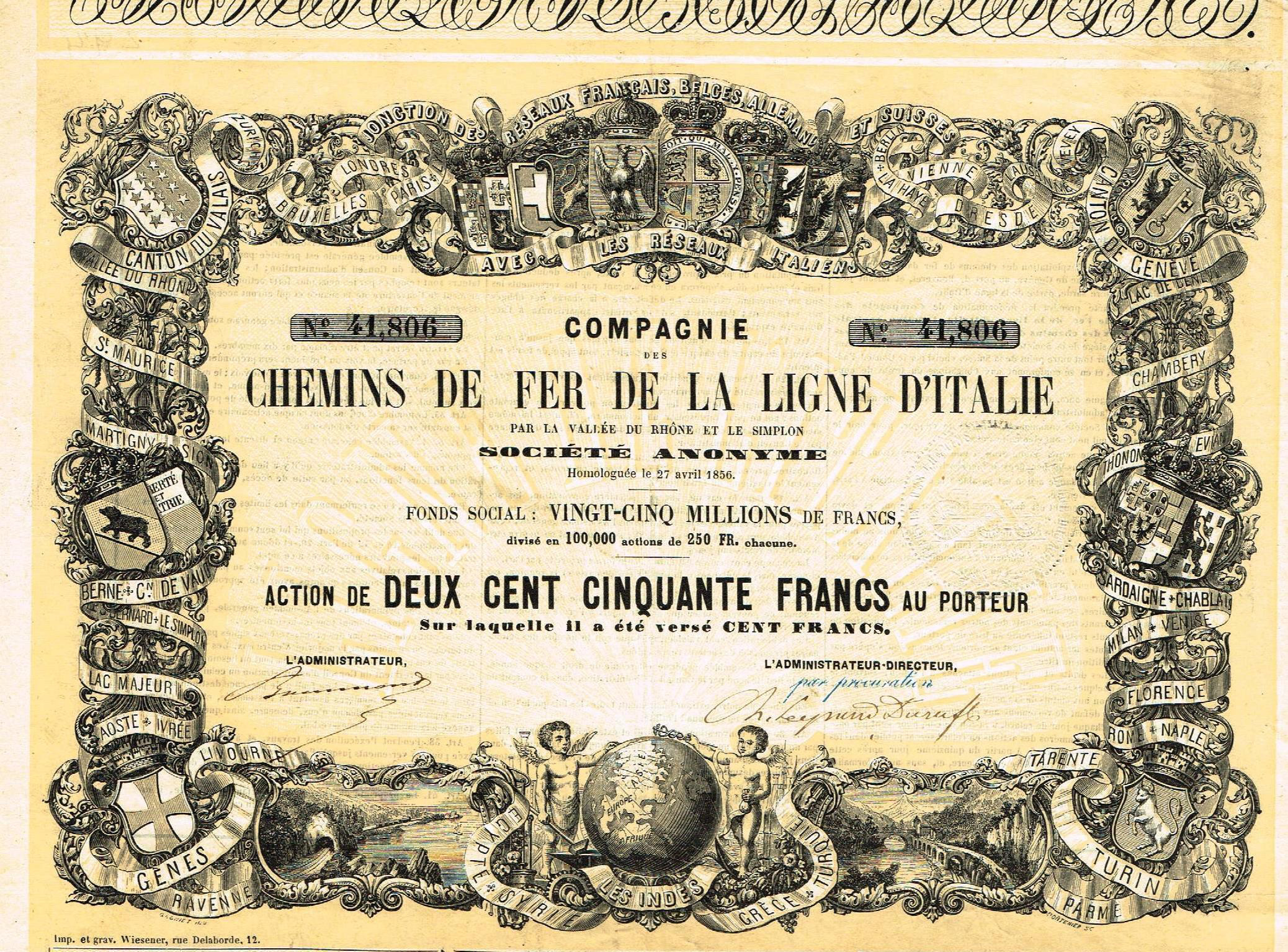
250 Franc share certificate of the Compagnie des Chemins de Fer de la Ligne d'Italie issued on 27 April 1856

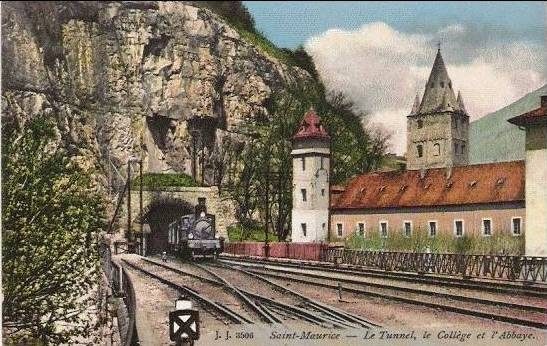
Saint-Maurice tunnel near Saint-Maurice station. North of the tunnel is the Les Palluds service station, where the line of the Western Swiss Railways joined the line from Le Bouveret.

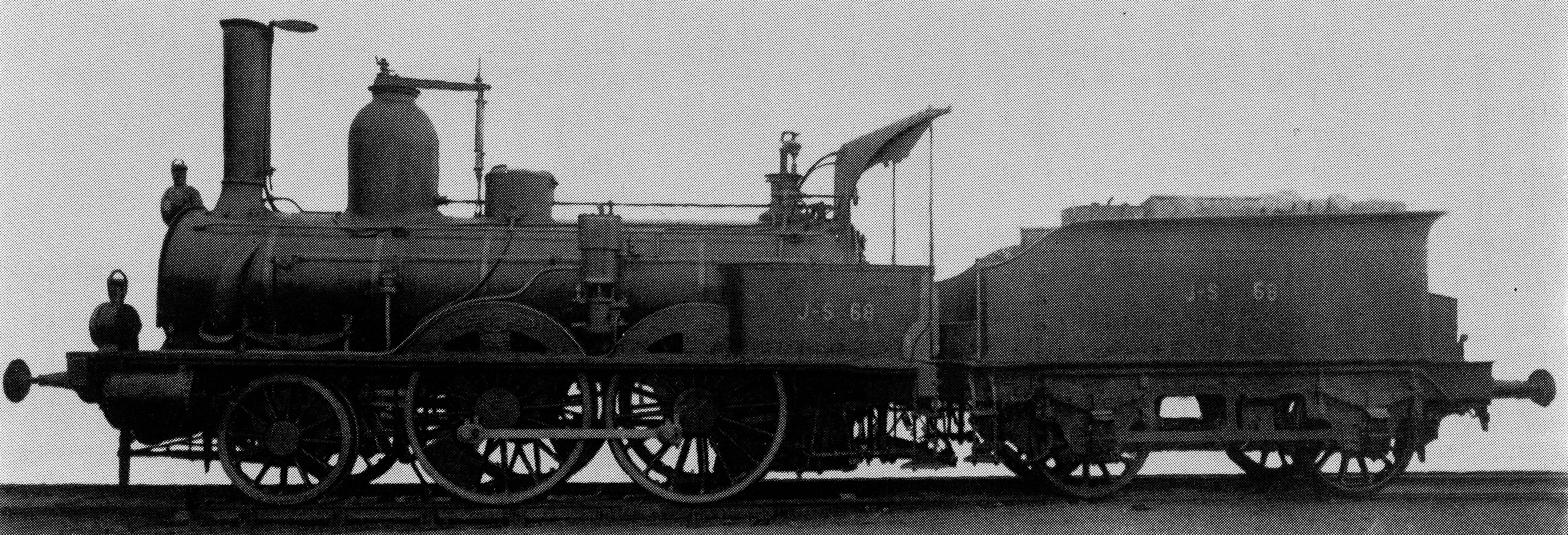
Locomotive A2T No. 68 of the Jura–Simplon Railway, built for the Ligne d'Italie in 1858.

Although a line on the St. Gingolph–Saint-Maurice–Brig route was technically easy to build, the Valais government was unable to attract enough Swiss investors to build the line. The share capital came from France. The driving force behind the project was the speculator Count Adrien de Lavalette (Fr). The company gained a concession for a line from Le Bouveret to Sion in 1853.

The object of the Ligne d’Italie company founded in 1856 was to build a connection between Romandy and Italy through the Canton of Valais and the Simplon. The connection to Geneva and France was planned to run along the southern shore of Lake Geneva.

After several requests, de Lavalette commenced construction. The Ligne d’Italie opened its first section from Le Bouveret (at the southeastern end of Lake Geneva) to Martigny via Saint-Maurice on 14 July 1859. The line was extended to Sion on 10 May 1860. On 2 April 1861, the Western Swiss Railways opened the last section of its line from Lausanne to Les Paluds near Saint-Maurice, giving the Ligne d'Italie access to the Swiss railway network.

The next section from Sion to Sierre opened after some delay on 15 October 1868, bringing the total length of the line to 79.5 km.

The company, which opened up the very agricultural canton of Valais, was not successful. In addition, Sardinia ceded Savoy to France in 1860 and, with the opening of the Fréjus Rail Tunnel in 1871, a line was opened from Lyon to Turin, which competed directly with the projected line. The Ligne d'Italie was liquidated in 1871 and a new company was established under the same name.

=== Compagnie du Simplon ===
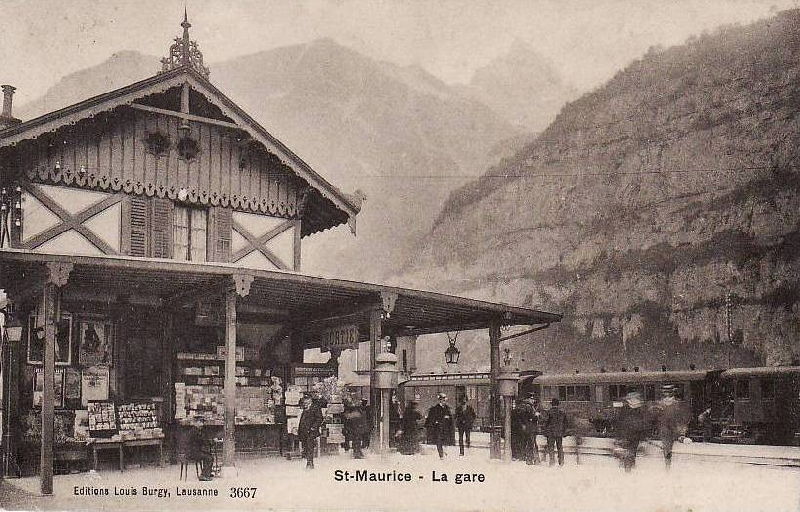
Saint-Maurice station

The LI had to be liquidated for the second time and it was sold on 1 June 1874 to the new Compagnie du Simplon (S) for a symbolic price of CHF 202,422 plus CHF 500,000 of bonds. The shareholders lost all their capital and the work, which had cost almost CHF 25 million.

The operations of the Compagnie du Simplon were managed by the Western Swiss Railways (SO). The line was extended from Sierre to Leuk on 1 June 1877 and to the provisional terminus in Brig on 1 July 1878. The line was now 116.9 km long.

Although projects have been developed time and again to extend the line through a tunnel under the Simplon to Domodossola, sufficient finance did not become available for the time being. The line remained a branch line and the operation's results were insufficient to cover interest charges. Nevertheless, the Simplon Railway led to significant economic progress in the Valais.

On 1 July 1881, the Compagnie du Simplon was bought by the Western Swiss Railways, which then changed its name to the Western Switzerland–Simplon Company (Suisse-Occidentale–Simplon, SOS). The short Le Bouveret–Saint-Gingolph branch line opened on 1 June 1886, connecting with the line of the Chemins de fer de Paris à Lyon et à la Méditerranée in Savoy. In 1890, the SOS merged with the Jura-Simplon-Bahn (JS), which significantly accelerated the efforts to construct the Simplon Tunnel.

== Rolling stock ==
The following is a list of the locomotives of the Ligne d'Italie and the Ligne du Simplon:

Designation	LI and S no.	Name	SOS no. from 1881	JS no. from 1890	SBB no. from 1903	Manufacturer	Build year	Scrapped
from 1873: A from 1874: I (SO VI) from 1881: I from 1887: A2T (from 1902: B 2/3)	1	–	41	67	–	Fives	1858	1892
from 1873: A from 1874: I (SO VI) from 1881: I from 1887: A2T (from 1902: B 2/3)	2	–	42	68	–	Fives	1858	1896
from 1873: A from 1874: I (SO VI) from 1881: I from 1887: A2T (from 1902: B 2/3)	3	–	43	63	–	Fives	1858	1893
from 1873: A from 1874: I (SO VI) from 1881: I from 1887: A2T (from 1902: B 2/3)	4	–	44	64	–	Fives	1858	1892
from 1873: A from 1874: I (SO VI) from 1881: I from 1887: A2T (from 1902: B 2/3)	5	–	45	65	–	Fives	1858	1895
from 1873: A from 1874: I (SO VI) from 1881: I from 1887: A2T (from 1902: B 2/3)	6	–	46	66	–	Fives	1858	1892
II (SO VI) from 1881: II from 1887: A2T from 1902: B 2/3	7	St-Maurice	27	80	1080	SACM	1875	1903
II (SO VI) from 1881: II from 1887: A2T from 1902: B 2/3	8	Sion	28	81	1081	SACM	1875	1903
II (SO VI) from 1881: II from 1887: A2T from 1902: B 2/3	9	Brigue	29	82	1082	SACM	1875	1903
