= Grandfey Viaduct =

Railway bridge in Fribourg, Switzerland

Coordinates: 46.8264°N 7.1678°E

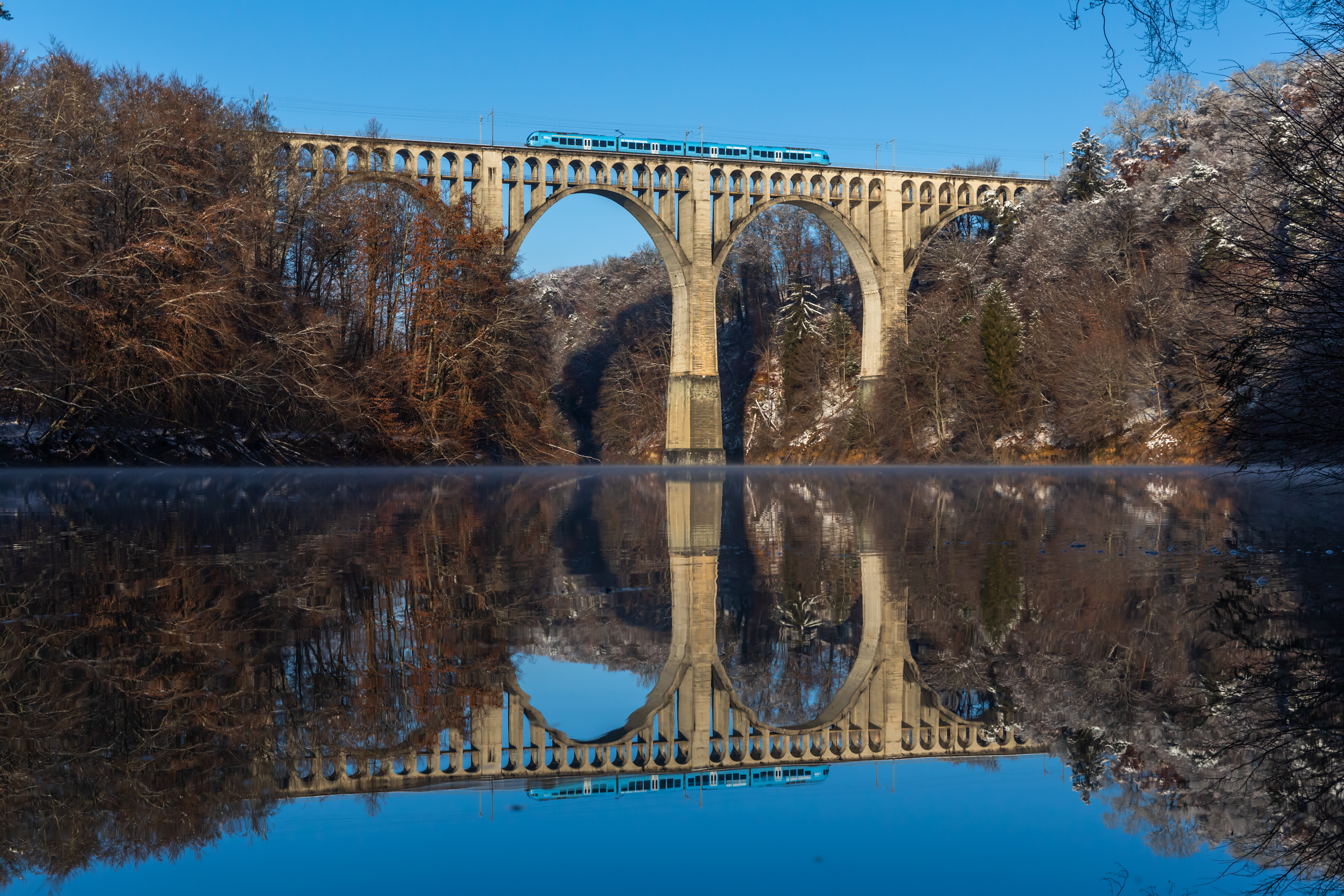
Grandfey Viaduct with a TPF RABe train, 2022

The Grandfey-Viaduct is on the railway line from Bern to Fribourg and is one of the largest bridges in Switzerland.

== Location ==
The viaduct crosses the deep and wide Saane/Sarine valley, which is cut into Molasse rock, in the hamlet of Grandfey in Granges-Paccot, about three kilometres north of Fribourg station on the way to Düdingen.

The viaduct crosses the language border between Romandy and German-speaking Switzerland (the "Röstigraben").

== History ==
=== First viaduct ===
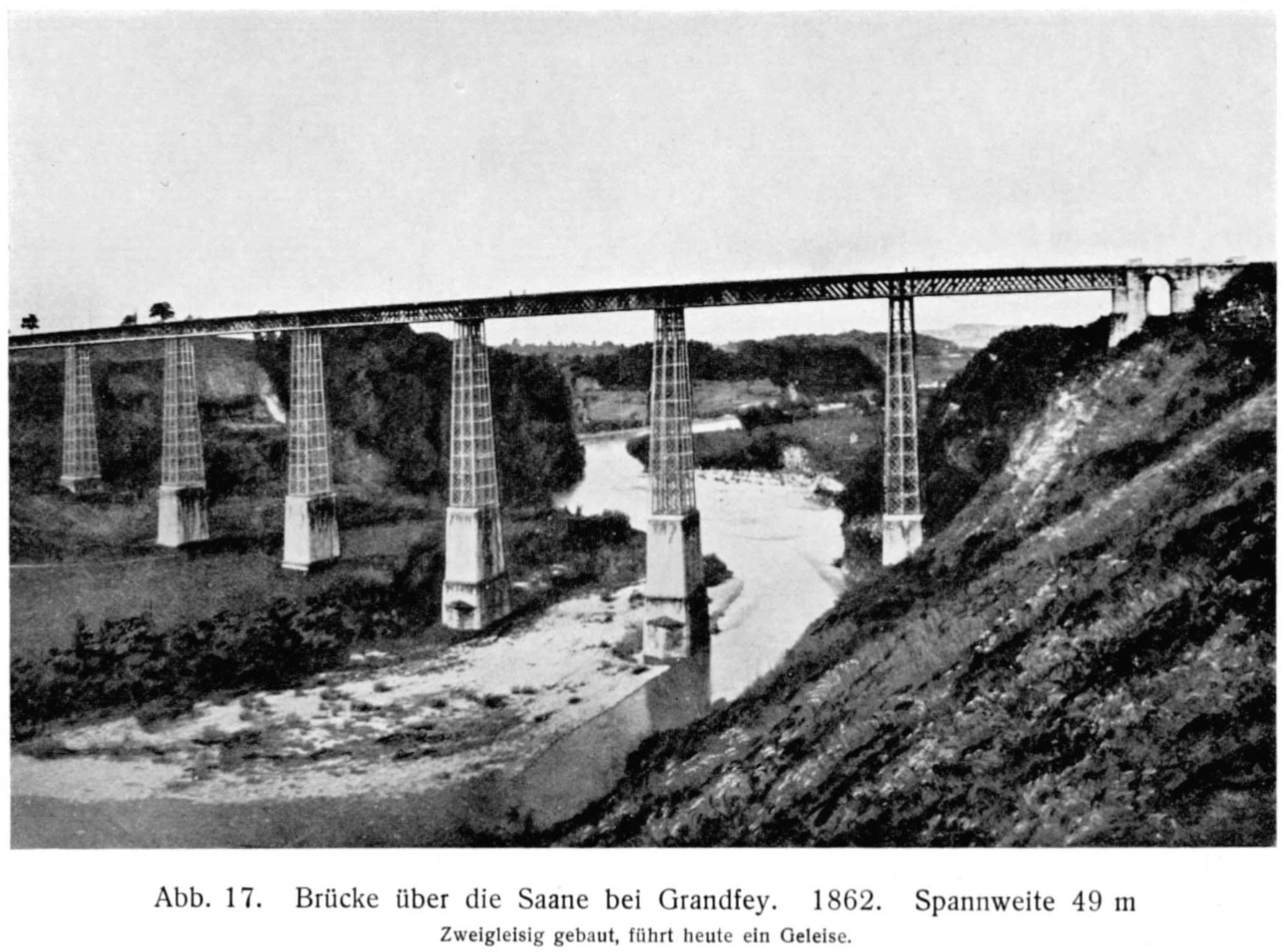
Grandfey Viaduct of 1862

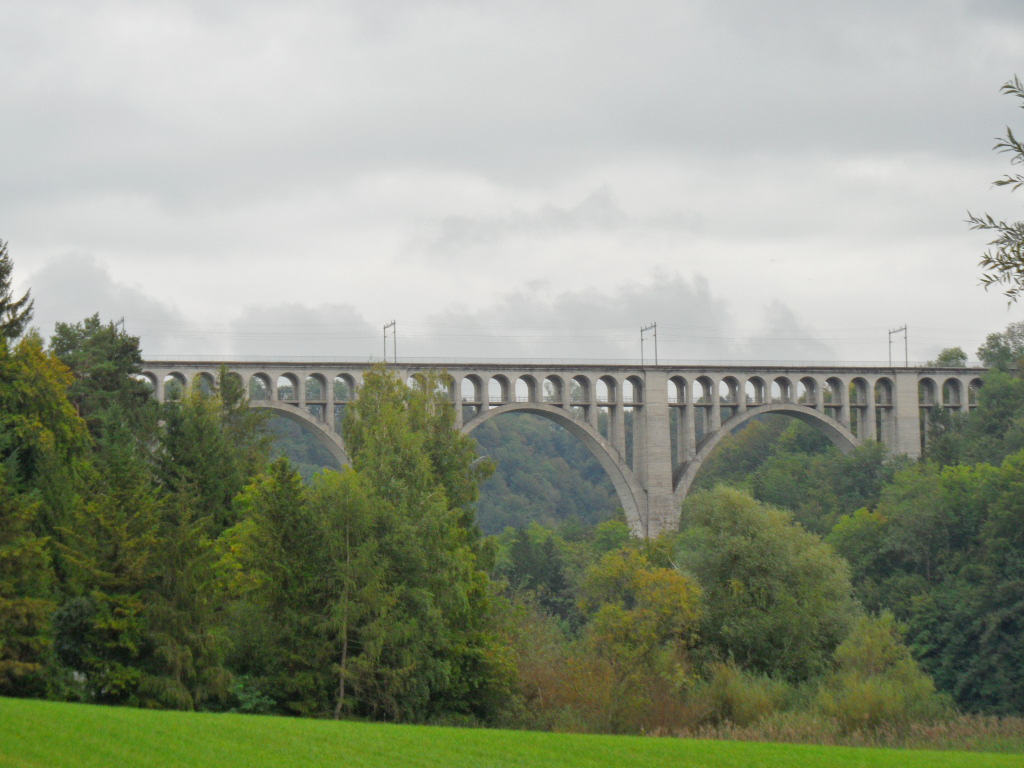
New Grandfey Viaduct, 2011

In 1856, the Lausanne–Fribourg–Bern Railway Company commissioned engineer Leopold Blotnitzki to carry out studies for this most complex construction project in its route network. The design was developed by a commission of four, consisting of Durbach, Karl Etzel, François Jacqmin and Wilhelm Nördlinger, as the engineer (who was then active in France under the name Nordling) was called in Stuttgart. This planning took into account the recently built Crumlin Viaduct in South Wales and the Sitter Viaduct near St. Gallen. Planning for the construction process was carried out by Ferdinand Mathieu, senior engineer of the French iron and steel company Schneider et Cie in Le Creusot, which had received the metalworking contract for the bridge. The earthwork and masonry work was carried out by the Swiss company Wirth, Studer & Co.

The 343 m long and 82 m high double-track bridge built from 1857 to 1862 consisted of six vertical lattice trusses supported by large stone pillars, carrying a strong lattice girder supporting the superstructure of the rail tracks. The five central spans were each 48.75 m long and the side spans were 43.30 m long. Inside the truss there was a lane for pedestrians and small carts. Thus the Grandfey Viaduct created a new route for light land transport over the long and impassable gorge of the Saane.

The masonry stone bases were up to 32 m high so that their heads were all at the same level. The flow dividers of pillars IV and V standing in the river were protected by limestone cladding against the current.

The pillars consisted of 3.93 m long cast iron pipes, which were arranged on 11 levels stacked together 43.20 m high and connected by lattice-shaped wrought iron trusses and stiffened.

The track base consisted of four wrought-iron lattice girders spaced 2.09 m apart, measured from their centres. The passage for the pedestrians was located between the two middle girders.

The Grandfey Viaduct is considered the first bridge where Ferdinand Mathieu, senior engineer of Schneider & Cie., used the incremental launch method that he invented. In this case, the lattice girder beam that was pushed over the valley served as a crane for the construction of the first and subsequently the next pillar.

1300 tons of cast iron and 700 tons of wrought iron were used for the pillars and 1250 tons of wrought iron were used for the beams.

The Grandfey viaduct influenced the Busseau Viaduct in France, which was designed shortly afterwards by Nördling. It also served as a model for the Malleco Viaduct in Chile, which was also built by Schneider & Cie. from 1886 to 1890.

Because of heavier trains, the bridge was rebuilt in 1892 with a single track, which was positioned in the middle of the deck and the speed was limited to 40 km/h.

=== Second viaduct ===
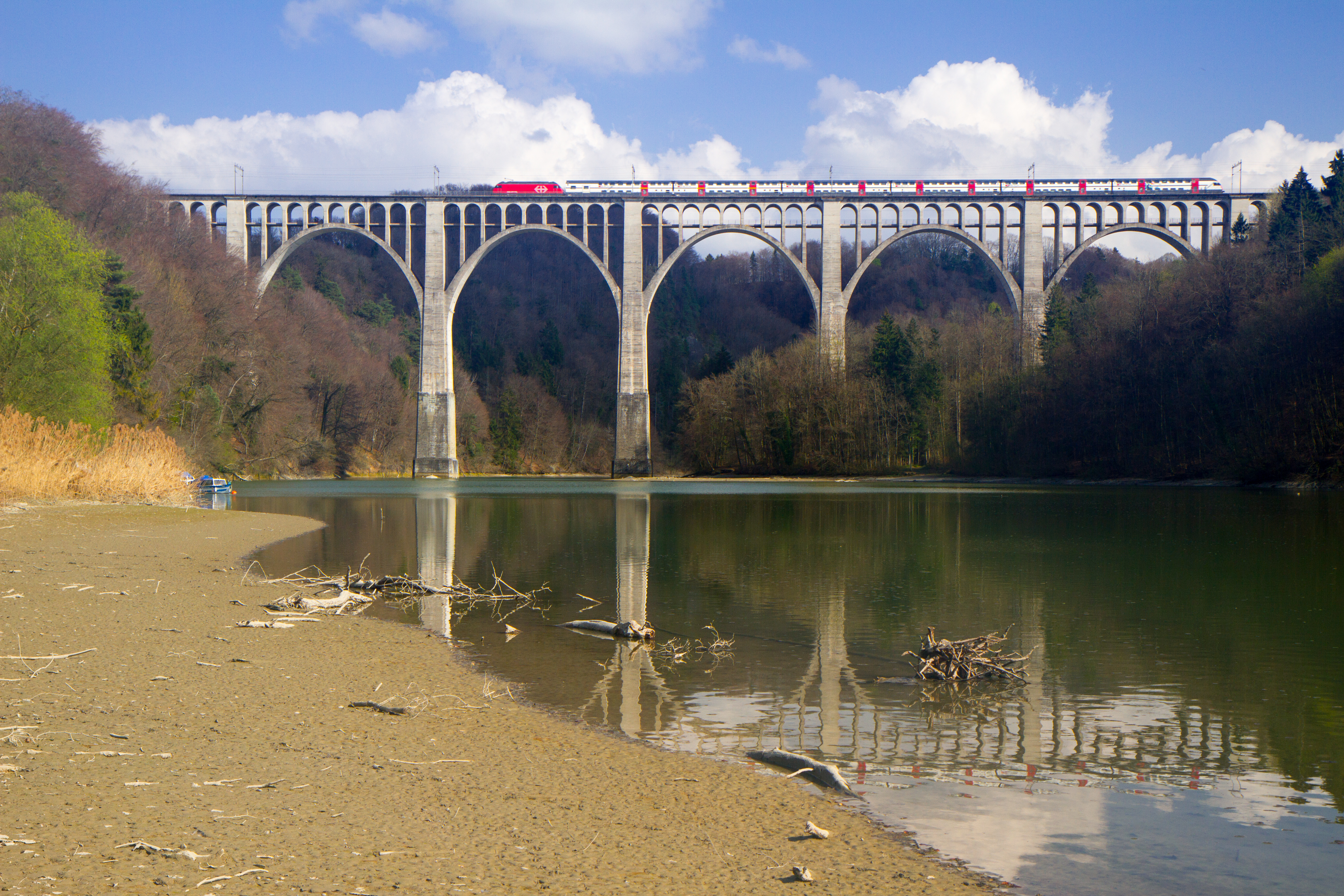
Grandfey Viaduct on 2014, April 24, with IC 2000 double-deck train

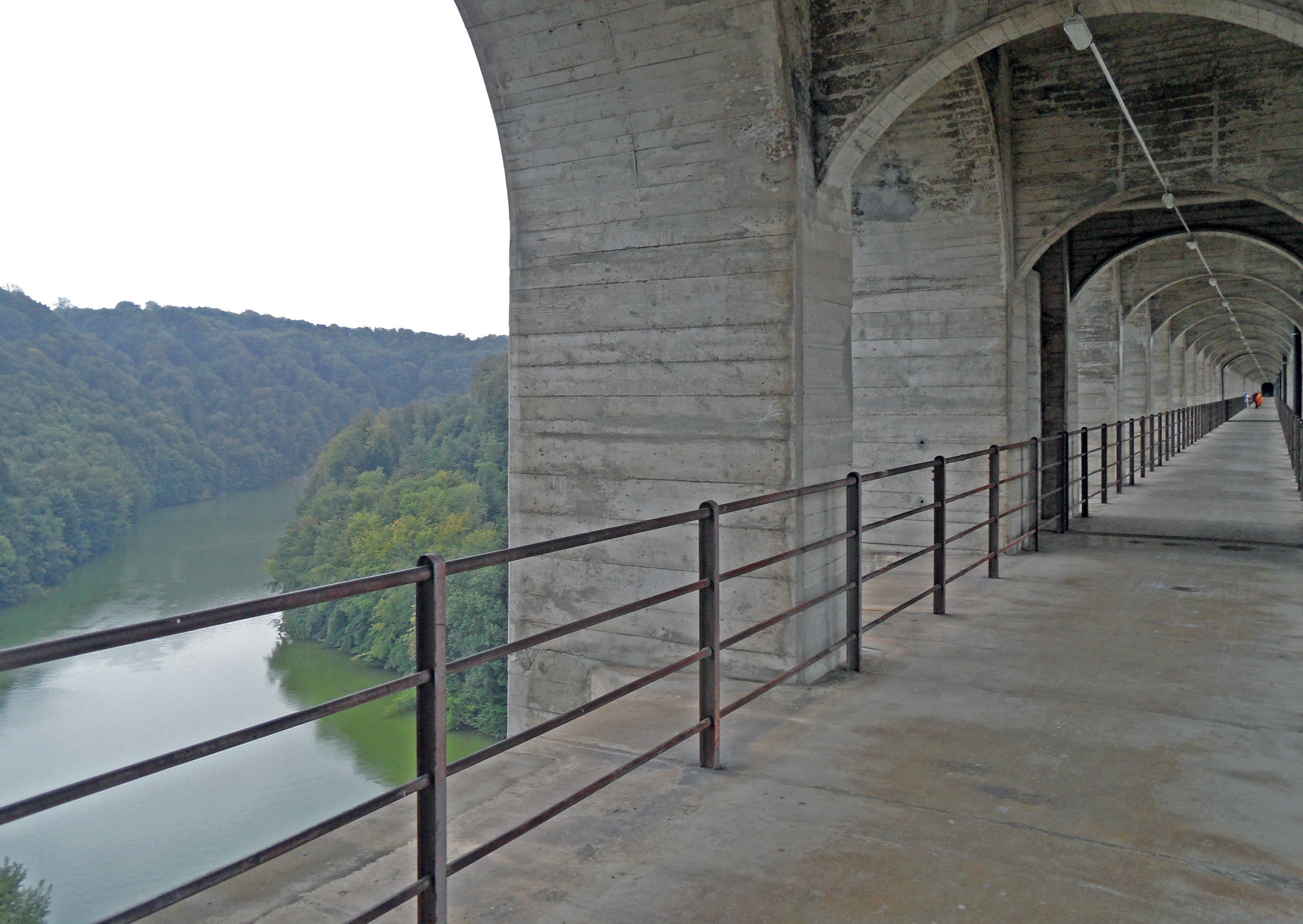
Pedestrian path below the tracks

With the electrification of the Swiss Federal Railways (SBB) network, the bridge had to be strengthened to carry heavier and faster locomotives and train compositions. The Grandfey Viaduct was rebuilt in a new form from 1925 to 1927 following principles developed by the bridge construction office of the SBB, which had already been realised with the Le Day Viaduct. SBB involved Robert Maillart, the pioneer of large concrete structures in Switzerland, as an advisory engineer. Supported by pillars consisting of iron trusses completely enclosed in concrete, the bridge has six wide concrete arches that are built according to the Melan system, over the top of which runs a pedestrian walkway. The five middle arches have clear spans of 42 m. Long rows of slender arcades that carry the track bed rest on the main arches. The double row of arches gives the large structure a monumental classical form.

As a result of the construction of the Schiffenen dam, which was completed in 1964, the lower part is now filled by the water of the Schiffenensee.

== Passage and sculpture by Richard Serra ==
The passage through the Grandfey Viaduct is one of the most beautiful points on the canton of Fribourg's network of hiking and cycling trails.

A modern sculpture by the American artist Richard Serra is located on this passage. The artwork represents an L-shaped steel girder and was created in 1987. In August 2007, the SBB had two handrails attached to the artwork for safety reasons, which were later removed.
