= Geneva–Versoix Railway =

The Geneva–Versoix Railway (French: Chemin de Fer Genève-Versoix, GM) is a former Swiss railway company that existed officially for only six days in 1858.

The line from Versoix to Geneva was opened by the GM was on 25 June 1858. On the following 1 July the company was absorbed into the Lausanne–Fribourg–Bern Railway (LFB).
