= Bernese Jura Railway =

Swiss rail company

Jura–Bern–Lucerne in 1889

History
- Opened: 1874
- Closed: 1890
Route map
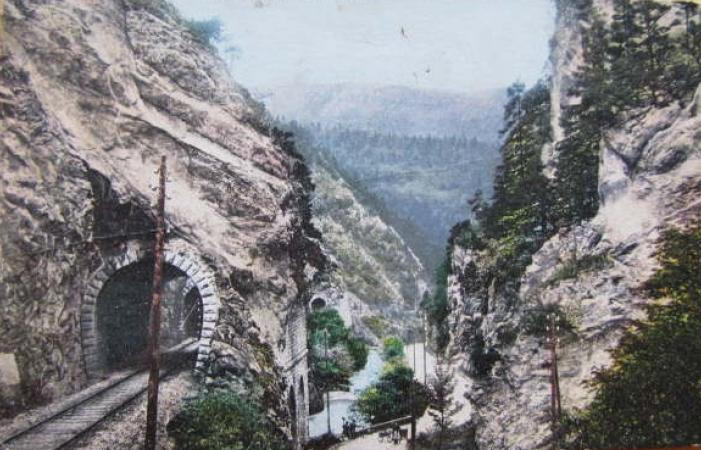
The gorge of Moutier
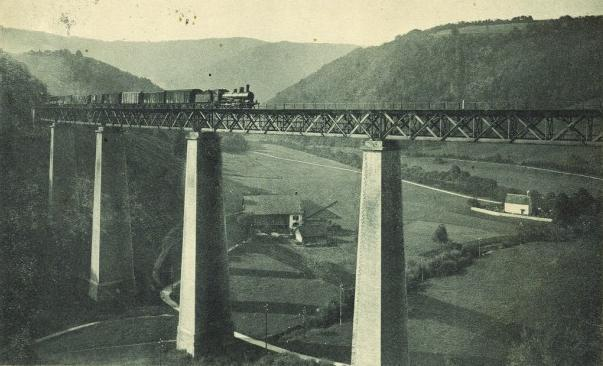
Combe Maran Viaduct near Saint-Ursanne
- Intermediate stations and connecting tracks not shown. Light red: Neuchâtel–Le Locle line, which was transferred to JN in 1886 and Le Creux–Convers (closed 1888) Dotted: routes jointly owned by the SCB
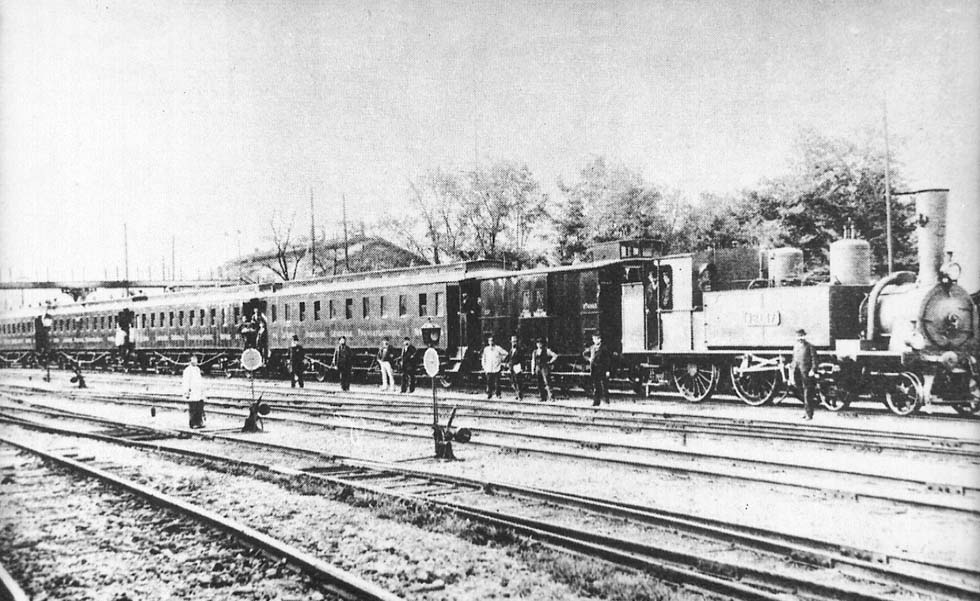
Basel–Delle–Paris–Le Havre train hauled by loco no. 17 before departure
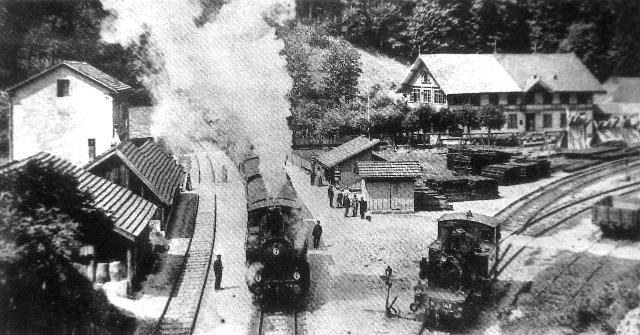
Convers station, on the left La Chaux-de-Fonds–Neuchâtel train, right track from Biel
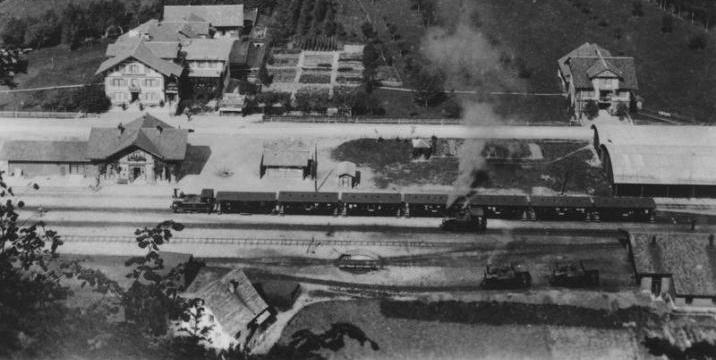
Giswil station about 1890. The rack section of the Brünig Railway starts in Giswil

The Bernese Jura Railway (Chemins de fer du Jura bernois, abbreviated Jura bernois, JB) was a railway company in Switzerland. The company was called the Jura–Bern–Luzern (Jura–Bern–Lucerne, JBL) from 1 July 1884. The Jura–Bern–Lucerne merged with the Western Switzerland–Simplon Railways (Suisse-Occidentale–Simplon, SOS) to form the Jura–Simplon Railway (Jura-Simplon-Bahn), JS) on 1 January 1890.

== History ==
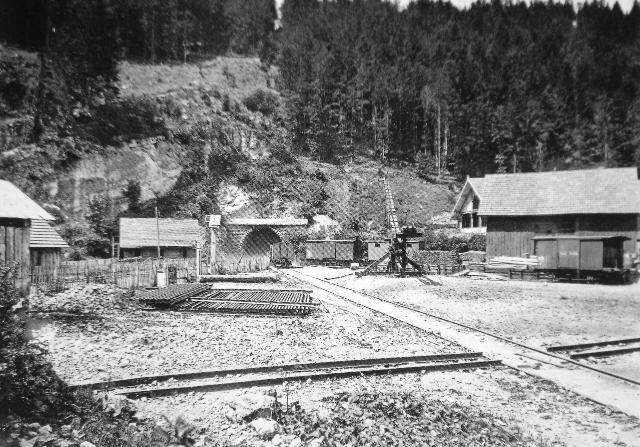
Convers in 1874 with the Bernese Jura line under construction.

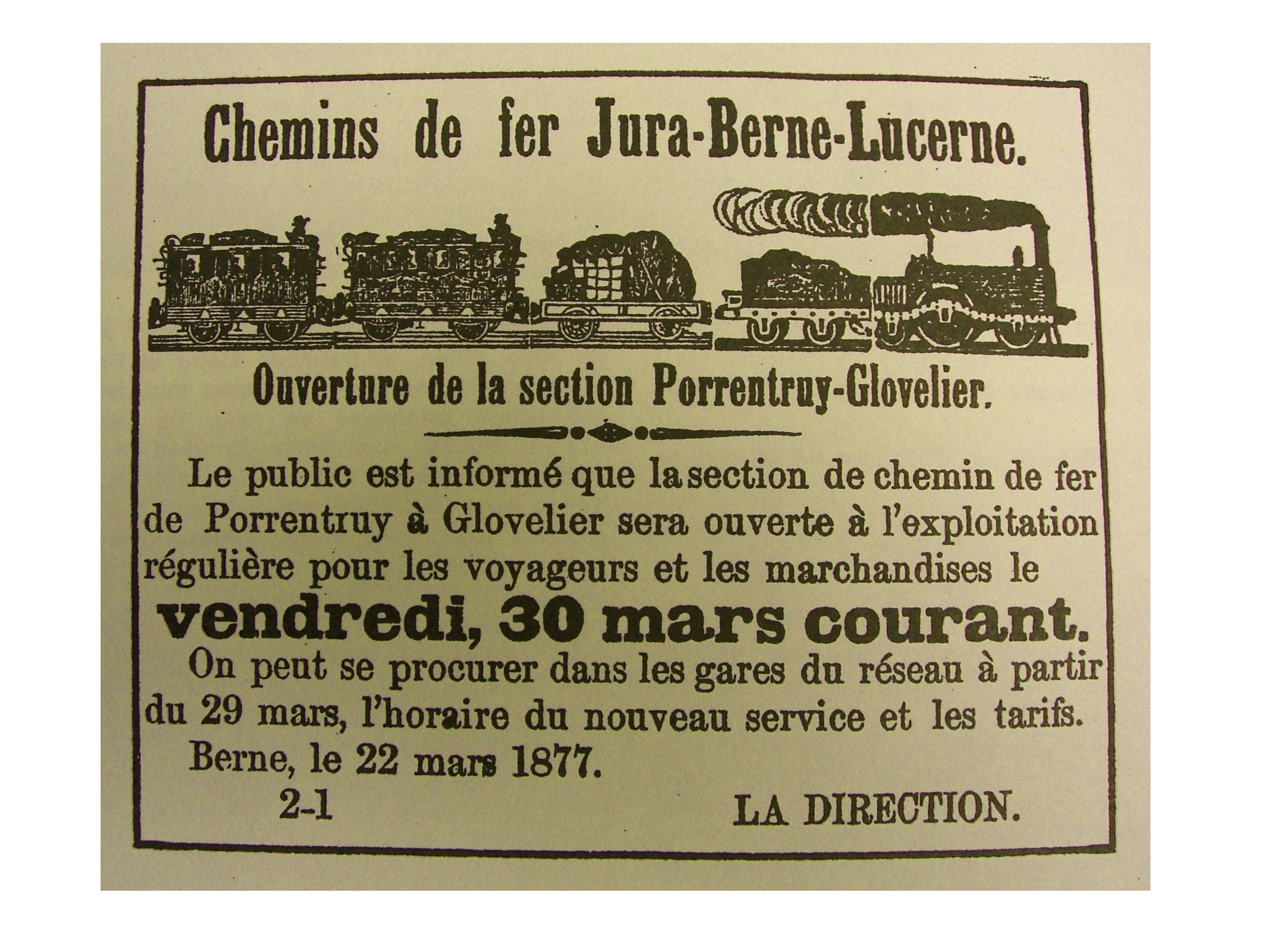
Newspaper advertisement for the opening of the Porrentruy–Glovelier section on 30 March 1877. The Jura–Bern–Luzern name was officially adopted in 1884.

The railway network of the Canton of Bern initially developed according to the interests of the Swiss Central Railway (Schweizerische Centralbahn, SCB). The Grand Council of Bern, decided to conclude a contract with the SCB in 1852. The Central Railway undertook to build the Murgenthal–Bern line and the Solothurn–Herzogenbuchsee railway within four years and in return received tax exemption and the privilege of being given preferential treatment in future grants of concessions to build railways. The Central Railway's construction now concentrated for a period on the more populated areas in the Swiss Plateau. The rugged and economically less developed Jura had a much more limited railway network. The Central Railway had no interest in competing with its existing Hauenstein Railway.

Under the chairmanship of Xavier Stockmar, the Zentralkomitee für die jurassische Eisenbahn (Central Committee for the Jura Railways) planned a railway line from Biel/Bienne to Basel with a branch from Delémont to Porrentruy. Although the concession was granted, it was not built due to lack of funds. To connect the Bernese Jura to the old part of the canton, the Grand Council provided a subsidy of CHF 6,950,000 of the estimated construction cost of CHF 40 million in 1867. The Delémont–Delle railway, which was financed by French companies, was built and handed over for operations on 23 September 1872.

=== Capital procurement, construction and transfer of track ===
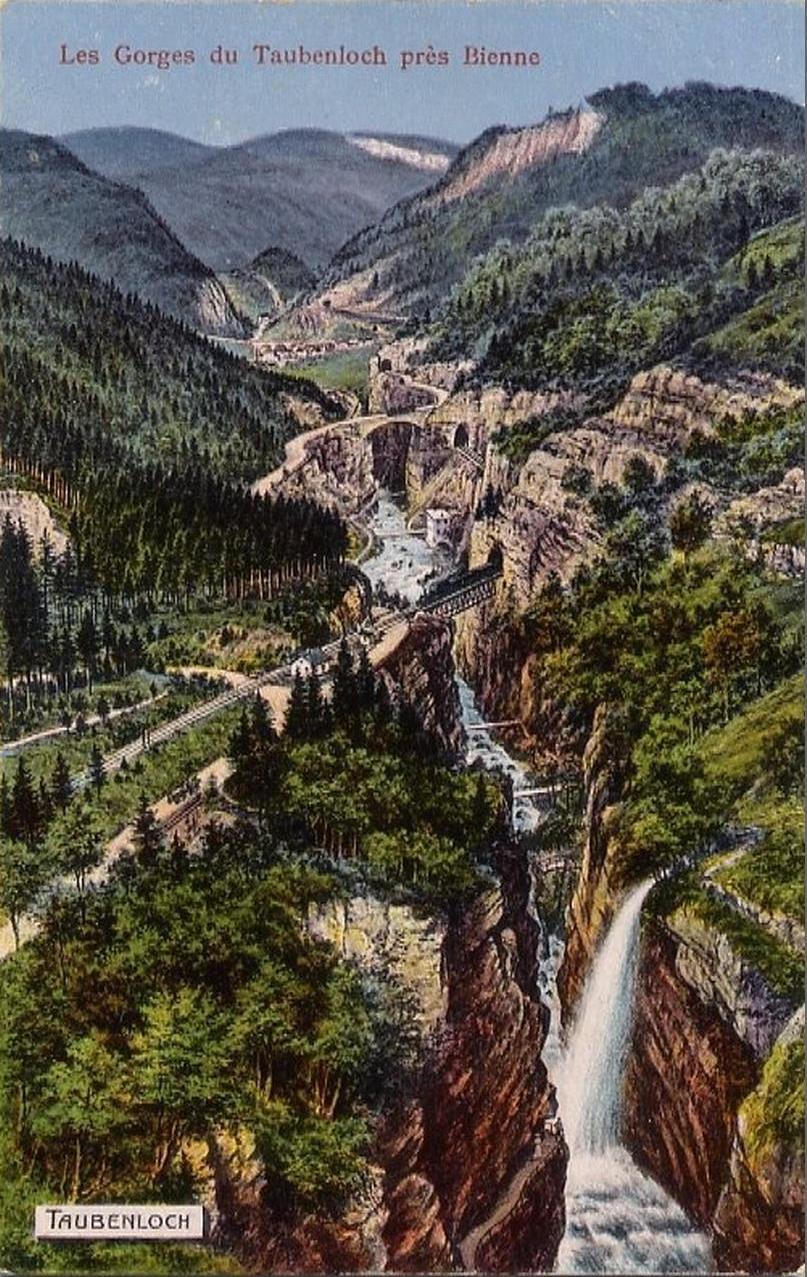
Route through the Taubenloch gorge between Biel and Reuchenette-Péry.

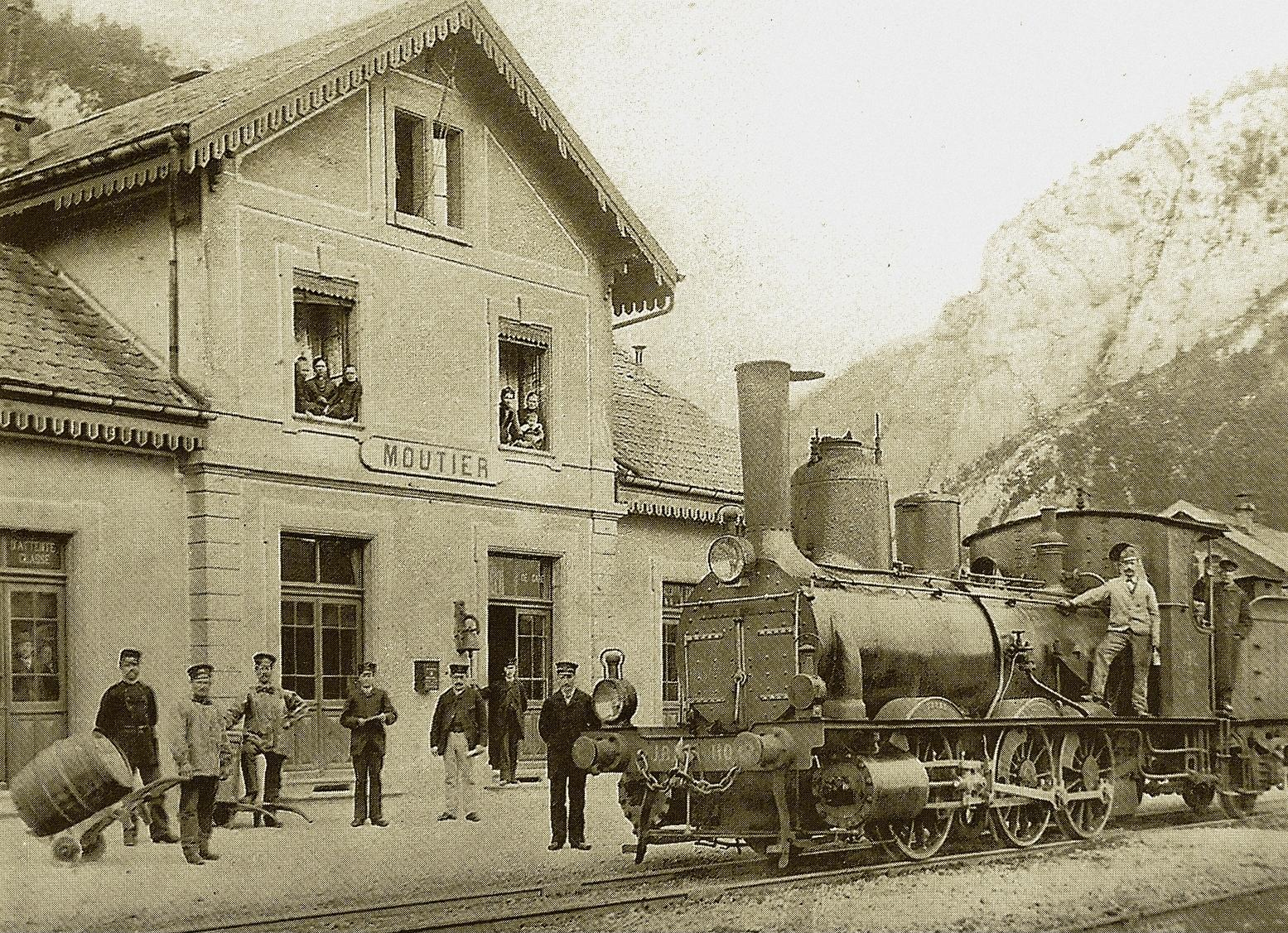
Goods locomotive No. 110 Doubs in Moutier station

A new situation arose in 1871, with the cession of Alsace-Lorraine to Germany after the Franco-Prussian War. A line built across French territory and through the Bernese Jura would connect the Paris–Belfort line directly to the Swiss Plateau. The Jura bernois was founded in 1874 as a joint-stock company, with the French Chemins de fer de l'Est subscribing CHF 4½ million and the canton of Basel-Stadt subscribing CHF 0.5 million. The municipalities and Bürgergemeinden of the Jura purchased a total of over 7 million shares, partially exploiting their forests to fund them.

The Jura bernois began construction and opened individual sections of its network between Biel, Convers (near La Chaux-de-Fonds), Delle and Basel between 1872 and 30 March 1877. It complemented its network through acquisitions. The JB bought the bankrupt Jura industriel (JI) for CHF 3.6 million on 1 May 1875 and the Chemin de fer Porrentruy–Delle (PD) for CHF 1.99 million on 16 August 1876. It took over the Bernese State Railway (Bernische Staatsbahn, BSB), including the Zollikofen–Biel –La Neuveville line in 1877. The canton of Bern received JB shares worth CHF 11.56 million in return.

The JB was built during the railway construction boom after 1872 and interest rates and construction prices rose sharply. The recession of 1876 and the subsequent "railway crisis" almost bankrupted even the financially solid Swiss Northeastern Railway (Schweizerische Nordostbahn, NOB). Against this background, the consistent profits of the JB were unusual. The revenue from freight was higher than the revenue from passengers in each year from 1878.

=== Jura–Bern–Lucerne ===
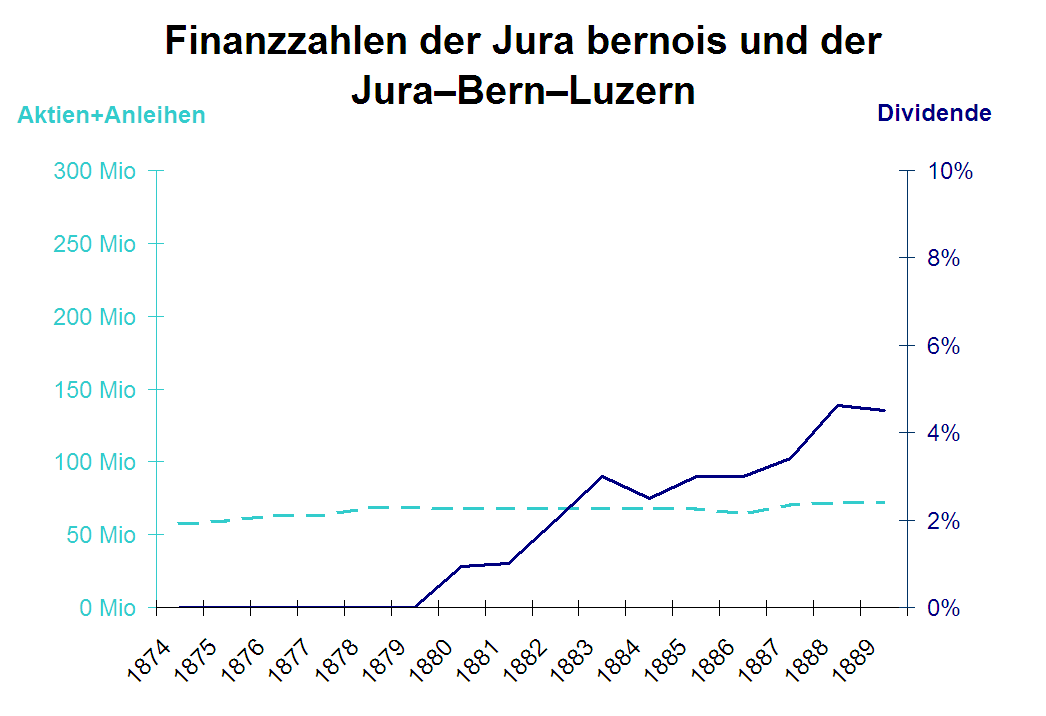
The positive operating results allowed the Jura–Bern–Luzern, to pay a dividend every year.

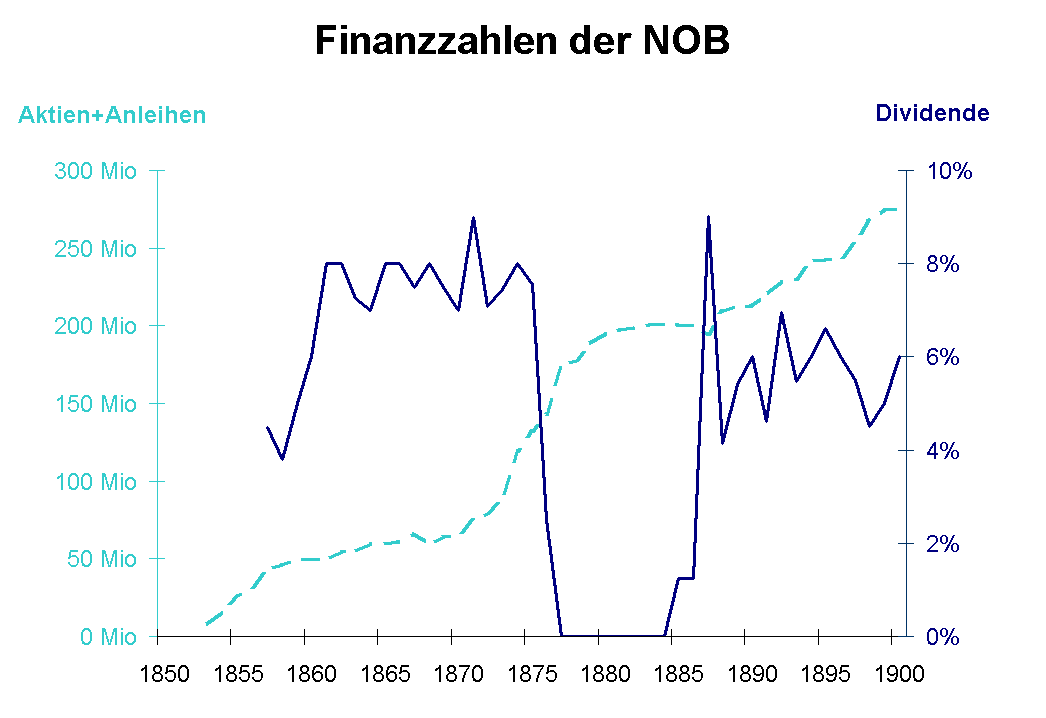
On the other hand, the NOB like other railway companies, suffered a drop in profits during the "railway crisis".

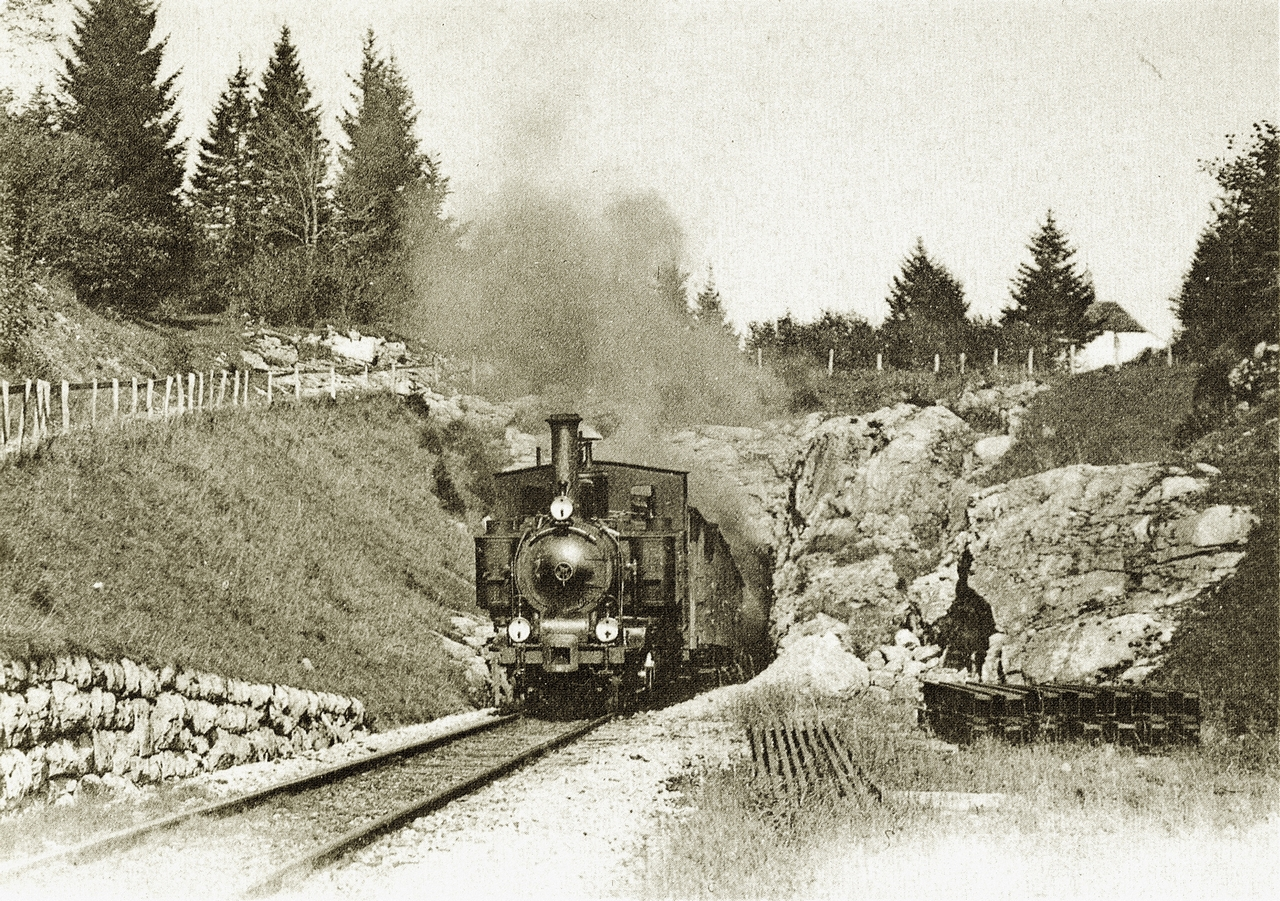
Train of the Brünigbahn with locomotive for mixed adhesion and rack operation

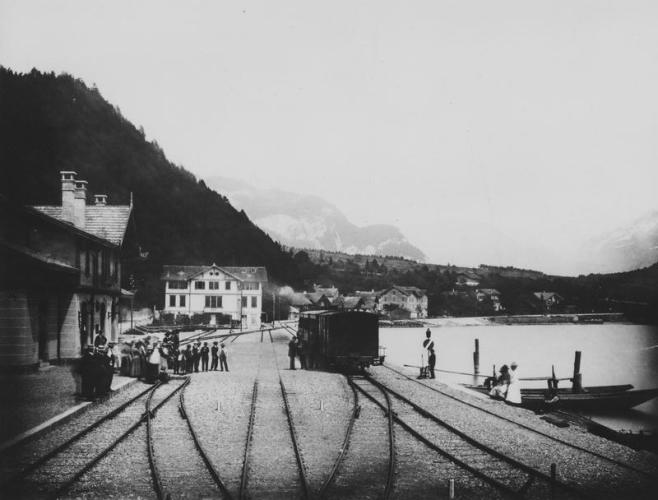
Brienz in about 1888. For the onward journey to Interlaken, passengers had to transfer to the ship.

For the start of the operations of the Bern-Lucerne Railway Company (Bern-Luzern-Bahn, BLB) in 1875, the BLB and the Bernese Jura formed a joint operating company called the Jura–Bern–Luzern (Lucerne). This company continued to exist even after the bankruptcy of the BLB and, as of 1 July 1882, the JB leased the line from Bern to Lucerne, which now belonged to the canton of Bern. Thus, the Bernese Jura came into possession of the continuous Delle–Bern–Lucerne line, which connected with the Gotthard Railway. This route competed with the route of the Swiss Central Railway (Centralbahn) via Olten, which lost direct access to the railway from Basel to France after the Franco-Prussian War. The extended route network prompted the railway to change its name to the Jura–Bern–Luzern (JBL). (Note: According to bahndaten.ch the JBL was created by renaming the Jura bernois. The Bern–Lucerne line was not taken over by the JBL, but continued to be leased from the canton of Bern.)

Ten years after its construction, the Canton of Neuchâtel exercised its buyback right and acquired the Neuchâtel–La Chaux-de-Fonds–Le Locle line on 1 January 1886 for around CHF 5 million, (Note: Placid Weissenbach puts the purchase price at CHF 5,141,079, while an amount of CHF 5.25 million is mentioned in bahndaten.ch.) so it could lease it to the newly established Jura neuchâtelois (JN). However, the JN could not earn enough to pay its rent, which made support by the public sector necessary.

The Jura–Bern–Luzern built the Brünig Railway from 25 August 1886. With the opening of the first, over 44 km long section from Alpnachstad via the Brünig Pass to Brienz on 14 June 1888, the network of the JBL was significantly extended. The extension from Alpnachstad to Lucerne followed on 1 June 1889. The metre-gauge line with sections of rack connects the two tourist regions of Central Switzerland and the Bernese Highlands. In addition, it was considered to have great military importance.

The Jura–Bern–Luzern also took care of the operation of the Bödelibahn (Bödeli Railway, BB) Därligen–Interlaken–Bönigen opened in 1872.

=== Merger into the Jura–Simplon Railway ===
On 1 January 1890, the Jura–Bern–Luzern including the Gümligen–Lucerne line, which was owned by the canton of Bern, and the Western Swiss Railways (Suisse-Occidentale–Simplon, SOS) merged to form the Jura–Simplon Railways (Chemins de fer du Jura-Simplon, JS). From this point on it was the largest Swiss railway company; it was partly owned by the Swiss Confederation as a result of the purchase of shares on the market. On 1 January 1891, the JS took over the operations of the Pont–Vallorbe Railway (Chemin de fer Pont–Vallorbe, PV). Only the JS had sufficient resources to progress on the construction of the Simplon Tunnel that had been planned for decades.

The bridge over the Birs built by Gustave Eiffel for the Bernese Jura collapsed shortly after the merger. The Münchenstein rail disaster on 14 June 1891 was the largest railway disaster in Switzerland to that time.

=== Graphical summary ===
Below is an overview of the history of the Jura bernois and the Jura–Bern–Luzern (O: opening; T: takeover):

Jura industriel (JI); O: 2.7.1857 T: 1.5.1875
East–West Railway (OWB); O: 3.12.1860 T: 1.6.1861
Bernese State Railway (BSB); T: 24.5.1877
Porrentruy–Delle (PD); O: 23.9.1872 T: 16.8.1876
Bernese Jura Railway; T: 30.4.1874
Gümligen–Langnau; T: 1.8.1875	Bern-Lucerne Railway (BLB); T: 15.1.1877
Canton of Bern; T (lease): 1.7.1882
from 1.7.1884; Jura–Bern–Lucerne; T: 1.1.1890
Jura neuchâtelois (JN)	Neuchâtel–Le Locle; T: 1.1.1886
Western Switzerland– Simplon (SOS); T: 1.1.1890	Pont–Vallorbe (PV); O: 31.10.1886; T: 1.1.1891
Jura–Simplon Railways (JS)

== Route network ==
No.	Route	Section	Opening	Remarks	Length (Note: Determined by chainage)
1.	Bern–Biel –Sonceboz–Moutier–Delémont–Basel	Bern–Bern Wylerfeld	(15 November 1858)	Section of the Olten–Bern railway used jointly with the SCB	(7.46 km)
1.	Bern–Biel –Sonceboz–Moutier–Delémont–Basel	Bern Wylerfeld–Zollikofen	(16 June 1857)	Section of the Olten–Bern railway used jointly with the SCB	(7.46 km)
1.	Bern–Biel –Sonceboz–Moutier–Delémont–Basel	Zollikofen–Lyss–Biel/Bienne	(1 June 1864)	Lyss–Busswil section taken over from the BSB on 24 May 1875; 2 tracks since 1877	115.54 km
1.	Bern–Biel –Sonceboz–Moutier–Delémont–Basel	Biel–Sonceboz–Tavannes	30 April 1874		115.54 km
1.	Bern–Biel –Sonceboz–Moutier–Delémont–Basel	Tavannes–Court	16 December 1876		115.54 km
1.	Bern–Biel –Sonceboz–Moutier–Delémont–Basel	Court–Moutier	24 May 1877		115.54 km
1.	Bern–Biel –Sonceboz–Moutier–Delémont–Basel	Moutier–Delémont	16 December 1876	Trains reverse in Delémont station	115.54 km
1.	Bern–Biel –Sonceboz–Moutier–Delémont–Basel	Delsberg–Basel Centralbahnhof (Note: Now Basel SBB)	25 September 1875		115.54 km
2.	Sonceboz–La Chaux-de-Fonds	Sonceboz–Le Creux–Convers (Note: Trains reverse in Convers station)	30 April 1874	Connection to Neuchâtel–Le Locle-Col-des-Roches railway. Le Creux–Convers operations ended on 17 December 1888 and the line closed on 1 July 1895	29.55 km
2.	Sonceboz–La Chaux-de-Fonds	Le Creux–La Chaux-de-Fonds	17 December 1888	Own access to La Chaux-de-Fonds after separation from the JN on 1 January 1886	29.55 km
3.	Delsberg–Delle	Delsberg–Glovelier	15 October 1876		39.84 km
3.	Delsberg–Delle	Glovelier–Porrentruy	30 March 1877		39.84 km
3.	Delsberg–Delle	Porrentruy–border (–Delle)	(23 September 1872)	Taken over by the PD on 16 August 1876	39.84 km
4.	Bern–Lucerne	Bern Wylerfeld–Gümligen	(1 July 1859)	Joint use of this section of the Bern–Thun railway with the SCB	(5.38 km)
4.	Bern–Lucerne	Gümligen–Langnau	(1 June 1864)	Originally BLB, bought by the canton of Bern at auction on 15 January 1877 and managed by the JB leased from the canton of Bern since 1 July 1882	3.27 km
4.	Bern–Lucerne	Langnau–Fluhmühle (Note: Now Gütsch)	(11 August 1875)	Originally BLB, bought by the canton of Bern at auction on 15 January 1877 and managed by the JB leased from the canton of Bern since 1 July 1882	3.27 km
4.	Bern–Lucerne	Fluhmühle–Lucerne	(1 June 1859)	Joint use of this section of the Olten–Lucerne railway with the SCB	(3.27 km)
5.	Biel–Neuchâtel (BE-NE canton border)		(3 December 1860)	Connecting in Lausanne to OS network, taken over by the BSB on 24 May 1875	14.45 km
6.	Neuchâtel–La Chaux-de-Fonds–Le Locle–Col des Roches	Neuchâtel–Neuchâtel-Vauseyon	(7 November 1859)	Joint use of the section of the La Neuveville–Lausanne line with FS	(1.37 km)
6.	Neuchâtel–La Chaux-de-Fonds–Le Locle–Col des Roches	Neuchâtel-Vauseyon–Les Hauts-Geneveys (Note: Trains reverse in Chambrelien station)	(1 December 1859)	Taken over by the JI on 1 May 1875, transferred to the JN on 1 January 1886	(38.21 km)
6.	Neuchâtel–La Chaux-de-Fonds–Le Locle–Col des Roches	Les Hauts-Geneveys–Convers	(15 July 1860)	Taken over by the JI on 1 May 1875, transferred to the JN on 1 January 1886	(38.21 km)
6.	Neuchâtel–La Chaux-de-Fonds–Le Locle–Col des Roches	Convers–La Chaux-de-Fonds	(27 November 1859)	Taken over by the JI on 1 May 1875, transferred to the JN on 1 January 1886	(38.21 km)
6.	Neuchâtel–La Chaux-de-Fonds–Le Locle–Col des Roches	La Chaux-de-Fonds–Le Locle	(2 July 1857)	Taken over by the JI on 1 May 1875, transferred to the JN on 1 January 1886	(38.21 km)
6.	Neuchâtel–La Chaux-de-Fonds–Le Locle–Col des Roches	Le Locle–Col des Roches–border(–Besançon)	4 August 1884	Taken over by the JI on 1 May 1875, transferred to the JN on 1 January 1886	(38.21 km)
7.	Brünig Railway	Lucerne–Alpnachstad	1 June 1889	1,000 mm (3 ft 3 3/8 in) metre gauge, partly rack Trains reverse in Meiringen station	57.64 km
7.	Brünig Railway	Alpnachstad–Brienz	14 June 1888	1,000 mm (3 ft 3 3/8 in) metre gauge, partly rack Trains reverse in Meiringen station	57.64 km
8.	Lyss–Fräschels (BE-FR canton border)		12 June 1876	Connection in Murten to the SO network	12.97 km
	Total				269.49 km (Note: Property length according to official railway statistics quoted in bahndaten.ch)

== Rolling stock ==
In 1882, the company owned 67 locomotives, 188 passenger cars and 682 freight cars.

The locomotives from the beginning were designated as class A for express-tank locomotives, B for locomotives of "Bourbonnais" design (referring to the Compagnie du chemin de fer de paris à Lyon par le Bourbonnais, a predecessor company of the PLM, which developed the design) for passenger trains on mountain lines and freight trains on valley routes, C for freight locomotives, D for pilot tender locomotives and E for shunters. The locomotives were designated according to the uniform system used throughout Switzerland from 1887.

The following locomotives were available to the Jura–Bern–Lucerne. The class designation valid from 1902 is listed in brackets.

Class from 1873	Class from 1887	JBL no.	Name	JS no. from 1890	SBB no. from 1903 (Note: The SBB renumbered the locomotives taken over after the completion of boiler revisions.)	Manufacturer	Build year	Remarks	Scrapped	Image
I	A2 (Ec 2/4)	1–12	Property of the Bern-Lucerne Railway (see there)							
A	A2 (Eb 2/4)	13		13	5441	SLM	1876	Biel workshop from 1903	1917	Passenger locomotive A2 no. 18
A	A2 (Eb 2/4)	14		14	5442	SLM	1876		1904	Passenger locomotive A2 no. 18
A	A2 (Eb 2/4)	15		15	–	SLM	1876		1900	Passenger locomotive A2 no. 18
A	A2 (Eb 2/4)	16		16	–	SLM	1876		1900	Passenger locomotive A2 no. 18
A	A2 (Eb 2/4)	17		17	5451	Esslingen	1880		1911	Passenger locomotive A2 no. 18
A	A2 (Eb 2/4)	18		18	5452	Esslingen	1880		1927	Passenger locomotive A2 no. 18
A	A2 (Eb 2/4)	19		19	5453	Esslingen	1880		1933	Passenger locomotive A2 no. 18
A	A2 (Eb 2/4)	20		20	5454	Esslingen	1880		1925	Passenger locomotive A2 no. 18
A	A2 (Eb 2/4)	21		21	5455	Esslingen	1881		1928	Passenger locomotive A2 no. 18
A	A2 (Eb 2/4)	22		22	5456	Esslingen	1881		1925	Passenger locomotive A2 no. 18
A	A2 (Eb 2/4)	23		23	5457	Esslingen	1881	1911 MO 1; sold in 1917		Passenger locomotive A2 no. 18
A	A2 (Eb 2/4)	24		24	5458	Esslingen	1881		1919	Passenger locomotive A2 no. 18
A	A2 (Eb 2/4)	25		25	5459	Esslingen	1883	Heating car Xd 99009 from 1927	1927	Passenger locomotive A2 no. 18
A	A2 (Eb 2/4)	26		26	5460	Esslingen	1883		1919	Passenger locomotive A2 no. 18
A	A2 (Eb 2/4)	27		27	5462	SLM	1888		1925	Passenger locomotive A2 no. 18
A	A2 (Eb 2/4)	28		28	5461	SLM	1888	Heating car Xd 99011 from 1927	1927	Passenger locomotive A2 no. 18
A	A2 (Eb 2/4)	29		29	5463	SLM	1888		1930	Passenger locomotive A2 no. 18
A	A2 (Eb 2/4)	30		30	5464	SLM	1888	EB 9 from 1926	1933	Passenger locomotive A2 no. 18
A	A2 (Eb 2/4)	31		31	5465	SLM	1888		1919	Passenger locomotive A2 no. 18
A	A2 (Eb 2/4)	32		32	5466	SLM	1888	Heating car Xd 99010 from 1927	1933	Passenger locomotive A2 no. 18
AI	B2E (Ec 2/5)	41–43	Taken over from the Jura industriel in 1875 (see there)			Esslingen	1856–1858	No. 42 was taken over in 1886 by the JN	1883–1888	
–	A3T (B 3/4)	41'		205	1561	SLM	1889		1924	
–	A3T (B 3/4)	42'		206	1562	SLM	1889		1924	
–	A3T (B 3/4)	43'		207	1563	SLM	1889		1924	
–	A3T (B 3/4)	44		208	1564	SLM	1889		1929	
–	A3T (B 3/4)	45		209	1565	SLM	1889		1924	
–	A3T (B 3/4)	46		210	1566	SLM	1889		1924	
–	A3T (B 3/4)	47		211	1567	SLM	1889		1924	
–	A3T (B 3/4)	48		212	1568	SLM	1889		1932	
B	B3T (C 3/3)	51–54	Property of the Bern-Lucerne Railway (see there)							Bourbonnais-hauling tender locomotive B3T no. 54
B	B3T (C 3/3)	55	Delémont	425	–	SACM	1875		1900	Bourbonnais-hauling tender locomotive B3T no. 54
B	B3T (C 3/3)	56	Laufon	426	–	SACM	1875		1901	Bourbonnais-hauling tender locomotive B3T no. 54
B	B3T (C 3/3)	57	Dornach	427	–	SACM	1875		1901	Bourbonnais-hauling tender locomotive B3T no. 54
B	B3T (C 3/3)	58	Bâle	428	–	SACM	1875		1902	Bourbonnais-hauling tender locomotive B3T no. 54
B	B3T (C 3/3)	59	Moutier	429	2416	SACM	1876		1905	Bourbonnais-hauling tender locomotive B3T no. 54
B	B3T (C 3/3)	60	St-Ursanne	430	2405	SACM	1876		1903	Bourbonnais-hauling tender locomotive B3T no. 54
B	B3T (C 3/3)	61	Porrentruy	431	2415	SACM	1876		1911	Bourbonnais-hauling tender locomotive B3T no. 54
C	C3T (D 3/3)	101	Stockmar	541	3392	SACM	1874	Originally had operating numbers 1–6. When the JB took over the operation of BLB in 1875, a new numbering scheme was established and the locomotives were renumbered.	1904	JS no. 542, built in Mülhausen
C	C3T (D 3/3)	102	Jura-Bernois	542	3393	SACM	1874	Originally had operating numbers 1–6. When the JB took over the operation of BLB in 1875, a new numbering scheme was established and the locomotives were renumbered.	1904	JS no. 542, built in Mülhausen
C	C3T (D 3/3)	103	St-Imier	543	3360	SACM	1874	Originally had operating numbers 1–6. When the JB took over the operation of BLB in 1875, a new numbering scheme was established and the locomotives were renumbered.	1908	JS no. 542, built in Mülhausen
C	C3T (D 3/3)	104	Bienne	544	3361	SACM	1874	Originally had operating numbers 1–6. When the JB took over the operation of BLB in 1875, a new numbering scheme was established and the locomotives were renumbered.	1907	JS no. 542, built in Mülhausen
C	C3T (D 3/3)	105	Suze	545	–	SLM	1874	Originally had operating numbers 1–6. When the JB took over the operation of BLB in 1875, a new numbering scheme was established and the locomotives were renumbered.	1901	JB no. 6 of SLM
C	C3T (D 3/3)	106	Birse	546	3399	SLM	1874	Originally had operating numbers 1–6. When the JB took over the operation of BLB in 1875, a new numbering scheme was established and the locomotives were renumbered.	1913	JB no. 6 of SLM
C	C3T (D 3/3)	107	Aare	547	3388	SACM	1875		1908	
C	C3T (D 3/3)	108	Thielle	548	3394	SACM	1875		1907	
C	C3T (D 3/3)	109	Sorne	549	3395	SACM	1875		1905	
C	C3T (D 3/3)	110	Doubs	550	–	SACM	1875		1902	
C	C3T (D 3/3)	111	Allaine	551	3362	SACM	1876		1917	
C	C3T (D 3/3)	112	Chasseral	552	3396	SACM	1876		1904	
C	C3T (D 3/3)	113	Montoz	553	3397	SACM	1876		1906	
C	C3T (D 3/3)	114	Mont-Terrible	554	3398	SACM	1876		1906	
C	C3T (D 3/3)	115	Rangiers	555	3363	SACM	1876		1917	
CI	D3E (Ed 3/5)	141, 142 and 144	Taken over by the Jura industriel in 1875 (see there)			Workshop of the SCB	1859	Taken over by the JN in 1886	1898–1905	
CI	D3E (Ed 3/5)	143, 145	Taken over by the Jura industriel in 1875 (see there)			Esslingen	1873	Taken over by the JN in 1886	1912–1914	
D	C3 (Ed 3/3)	151–157	Property of the Bern-Lucerne Railway (see there)							
E	F3 (E 3/3)	201		851	8571	SLM	1875		1913	
E	F3 (E 3/3)	202		852	8572	SLM	1875		1911	
Locomotives of the narrow gauge Brünig Railway:
–	G3 (G 3/3)	301		901	101	SLM	1887		1911	Brünig valley locomotive no. 309, now at the BC
–	G3 (G 3/3)	302		902	102	SLM	1887		1912	Brünig valley locomotive no. 309, now at the BC
–	G3 (G 3/3)	303		903	103	SLM	1888		1911	Brünig valley locomotive no. 309, now at the BC
–	G3 (G 3/3)	304		904	104	SLM	1888	1916 Trento–Malè 104		Brünig valley locomotive no. 309, now at the BC
–	G3 (G 3/3)	305		905	105	SLM	1888	1916 Trient–Male 105		Brünig valley locomotive no. 309, now at the BC
–	G3 (G 3/3)	306		906	106	SLM	1889	1916 IMB 106; 1919 Trient–Male 106		Brünig valley locomotive no. 309, now at the BC
–	HG2 (HG 2/2)	351		951	1001	SLM	1887	1908 SV 10; 1927 MCL 241	1936	Brünig mountain locomotive no. 352 for mixed adhesion and rack operations
–	HG2 (HG 2/2)	352		952	1002	SLM	1888	1908 MCM 2		Brünig mountain locomotive no. 352 for mixed adhesion and rack operations
–	HG2 (HG 2/2)	353		953	1003	SLM	1888	1908 O&K		Brünig mountain locomotive no. 352 for mixed adhesion and rack operations
–	HG2 (HG 2/2)	354		954	1004	SLM	1888		1908	Brünig mountain locomotive no. 352 for mixed adhesion and rack operations
–	HG2 (HG 2/2)	355		955	1005	SLM	1888		1908	Brünig mountain locomotive no. 352 for mixed adhesion and rack operations
–	HG2 (HG 2/2)	356		956	1006	SLM	1889		1911	Brünig mountain locomotive no. 352 for mixed adhesion and rack operations
–	HG2 (HG 2/2)	357		957	1007	SLM	1889		1911	Brünig mountain locomotive no. 352 for mixed adhesion and rack operations
–	HG2 (HG 2/2)	358		958	1008	SLM	1889		1911	Brünig mountain locomotive no. 352 for mixed adhesion and rack operations

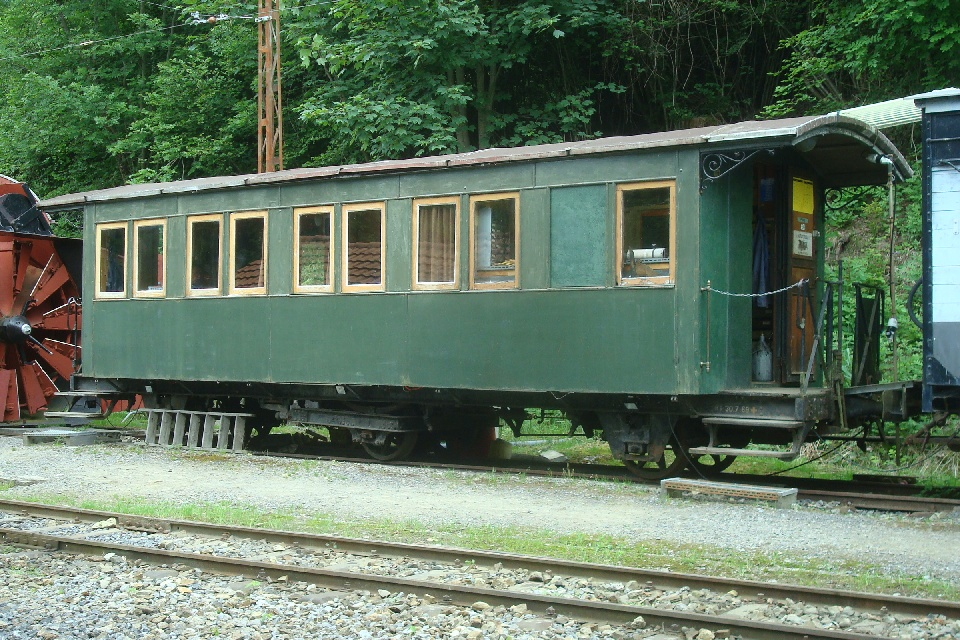
Third-class car C^{3} 466 of the Brünig Railway, built in 1889 by SIG in Neuhausen, now used as a service car of the BC
