= Bern-Lucerne Railway Company =

Defunct Swiss railway company

The Bern-Lucerne Railway (Bern-Luzern-Bahn, BLB) was a railway company in Switzerland, which opened the Langnau–Lucerne line, now part of the Bern–Lucerne railway, on 1 August 1875. It was taken over by the Jura–Simplon Railways (Chemins de Fer Jura–Simplon, JS) on 1 January 1890.

== History ==
=== Planning and construction ===
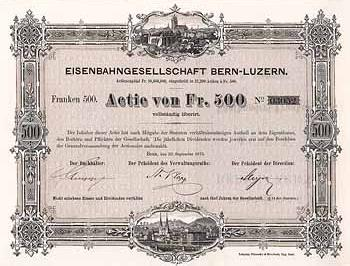
An original share of the Bern-Lucerne Railway

Plans for a new connection between Romandy and Central Switzerland were developed in the context of the construction of the Gotthard Railway (Gotthardbahn, GB). The projected line, running from Langnau to Lucerne through the Entlebuch, would compete with the existing lines of the Central Railway (Schweizerische Centralbahn, SCB). Resistance emerged to the route through the Entlebuch. Alfred Scheurer campaigned for a line via Sumiswald, Affoltern, Huttwil and Willisau, but was defeated in the Grand Council of Bern in 1871.

The main shareholders of the Bern-Lucerne Railway were the Canton of Bern and the Canton of Lucerne as well as some municipalities. However, many Emmental municipalities and the City of Bern showed little enthusiasm for subscribing for shares because they had already lost a significant amount of money in the failed Swiss East–West Railway (Ostwestbahn, OWB). Nevertheless, at the end of 1872, the Bern-Lucerne Railway had accumulated over CHF 14 million in the form of stocks and bonds, while construction costs were estimated at CHF 13.7 million.

The company acquired the Gümligen–Langnau section from the Bernese State Railway (Bernische Staatsbahn, BSB) for CHF 6.6 million and rolling stock from the same source for CHF 703,500. It hoped to improve the profitability of the branch line to Langnau by extending it to Lucerne. The construction costs of the Langnau–Lucerne line, built between 1873 and 1875, amounted to CHF 17,045,166. The company asked the canton of Bern to advance funds for the completion of the construction on 23 July 1875. The governing council exceeded its financial powers and handed over a sum that went down in Bernese history as the Vorschussmillion ("million advanced").

=== Bankruptcy ===
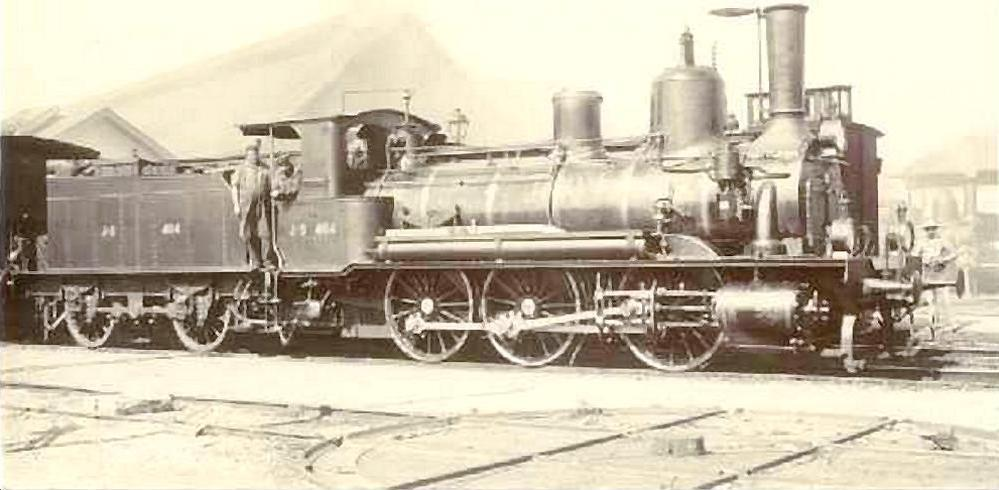
Steam locomotive B3T no. 424 of the Jura–Simplon Railways, put into operation by the Bern-Lucerne Railway as no. 54 in 1875

Railway operations were started on 1 August 1875 by an operating company called the Jura–Bern–Luzern that had been established by the BLB and the Chemins de fer du Jura bernois (Bernese Jura Railway). Soon, the Bern-Lucerne Railway could no longer pay the interest on its bonds and was declared bankrupt on 26/27 February 1876. The canton of Lucerne did not take part in the auction of the company's assets on 15 January 1877, so the canton of Berne bid against a consortium in which involved the Central Railway. The representatives of Bern were finally awarded the assets for CHF 8,475,000. The canton of Bern, as the main creditor, bought the railway for almost the same price that it had sold the Gümligen–Langnau section for. Around CHF 14.5 million was written off in bankruptcy, including the total share capital of CHF 10.6 million. Suppliers of goods and services received 70 percent of the face value of their claims.

The Bern-Lucerne Railway was not alone in having to fight against rising prices. Due to massive cost overruns in the construction of the Gotthard Railway in 1877, it was decided to abandon temporally the construction of some of its access lines—including the Lucerne–Immensee section. On the other hand, the Canton of Bern, which attached great importance to the direct connection of the Bern-Lucerne line to the Gotthard Railway, resisted. The Central Railway and the Northeastern Railway (Schweizerische Nordostbahn, NOB) undertook to grant the Bern-Lucerne Railway favourable conditions for its connection at Lucerne and an unobstructed connection via the Lucerne–Rotkreuz–Immensee route to the Gotthard Railway.

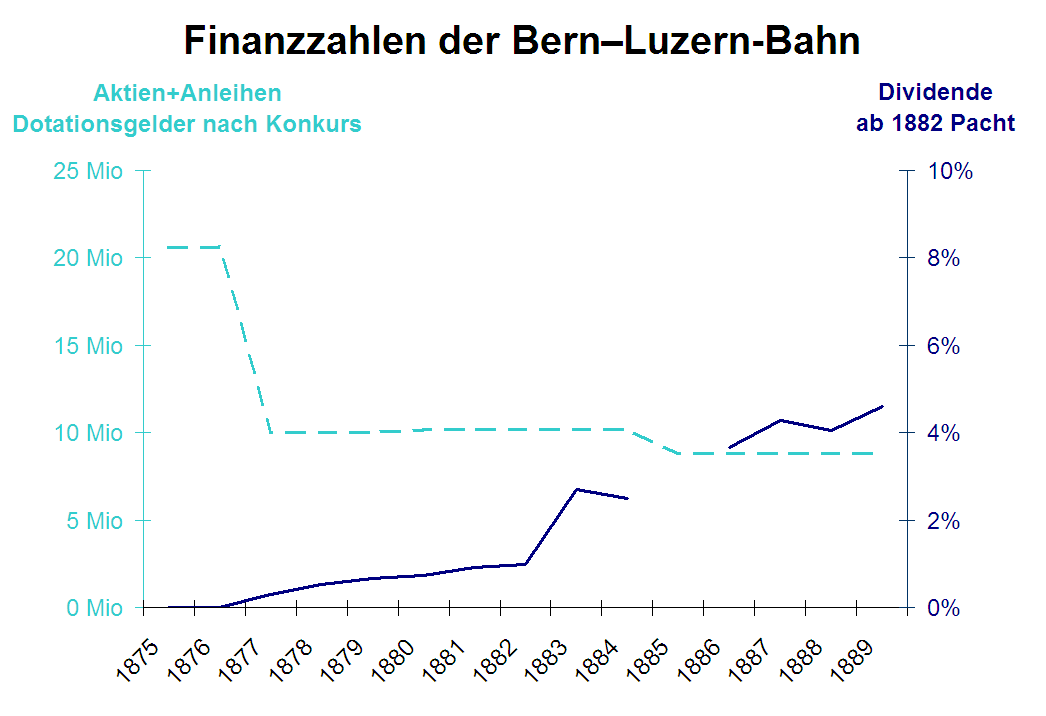
The entire share capital of the Bern-Lucerne Railway was lost when it went bankrupt in 1876, although a considerable amount of rent was paid to the canton of Bern from 1882 on.

The financial problems of the canton of Berne, including the "million advanced", had not been settled. It had incurred railway debts of more than CHF 40 million. The subsequent approval of the "million advanced" was vigorously rejected in a referendum on 26 August 1877. The government councilors accepted the consequences from this rebuff and resigned. In the elections for the Great Council in the spring of 1878, the Liberals suffered a severe defeat as a result of their financial policies.

=== Operations of the Jura-Bern-Lucerne ===
The operation of the railway was still carried out by the Jura–Bern–Lucerne operating group under the direction of the Jura bernois, initially on behalf of the canton of Bern and from 1 July 1882 under lease. Because the Bern–Lucerne line became part of its Delle–Biel/Bienne–Bern–Lucerne through line, the Jura bernois changed its name to the Jura–Bern–Luzern (Lucerne) on 1 July 1884. The operating results of this company were always in positive territory, even in difficult times, and allowed the canton of Bern to demand a respectable rent for the Bern-Lucerne line. The main source of income was freight, although passenger transport was also important.

As part of the merger of the Jura-Bern-Lucerne Railway with the Western Switzerland–Simplon Company (Suisse-Occidentale–Simplon), the Berne-Lucerne Railway, which still belonged to the canton of Bern, became part of the newly established Jura–Simplon Railways (Jura-Simplon-Bahn, JS) on 1 January 1890. The canton of Bern received a sizeable share of the newly created company in return for the Bern-Lucerne Railway and its share in the Jura-Bern-Lucerne Railway. The people of Bern were able to secure a decisive influence on the Jura-Simplon Railways.

== Line sections ==
The Bern–Lucerne line of the Bern-Lucerne Railway is divided into the following sections:

Section	Opening	Remarks	Length
Bern–Bern Wylerfeld	(15 November 1858)	Joint use of a section of the Bern–Thun line of the SCB	(7.689 km)
Bern Wylerfeld–Gümligen	(1 July 1859)	Joint use of a section of the Bern–Thun line of the SCB	(7.689 km)
Gümligen–Langnau	(1 June 1864)	Taken over from the BSB on 1 August 1875	29.850 km
Langnau–Fluhmühle (Note: Now Gütsch)	11 August 1875		54.109 km
Fluhmühle–Lucerne	(1 June 1859)	Joint use of a section of the Olten–Lucerne line of the SCB	(2.385 km)
Total			83.959 km

== Rolling stock ==
The following is a list of locomotives used by the BLB:

Class	BLB no.	JS no. from 1890	SBB no. from 1903	Manufacturer	Build year	Scrapped
from 1873: A from 1874: I from 1887: A2 (from 1902: Ec 2/4)	1–12, 1875 taken over by the Bernese State Railway (see there)					1888–1896
B from 1887: B3T from 1902: C 3/3	51	421	–	Koechlin	1875	1898
B from 1887: B3T from 1902: C 3/3	52	422	–	Koechlin	1875	1902
B from 1887: B3T from 1902: C 3/3	53	423	–	Koechlin	1875	1902
B from 1887: B3T from 1902: C 3/3	54	424	–	Koechlin	1875	1899
D from 1887: C3 from 1902: Ed 3/3	151	451	7291	Koechlin	1875	1909
D from 1887: C3 from 1902: Ed 3/3	152	452	7292	Koechlin	1875	1916
D from 1887: C3 from 1902: Ed 3/3	153	453	7293	Koechlin	1875	1913
D from 1887: C3 from 1902: Ed 3/3	154	454	7294	Koechlin	1875	1908
D from 1887: C3 from 1902: Ed 3/3	155	455	7295	Koechlin	1878	1906
D from 1887: C3 from 1902: Ed 3/3	156	456	7296	Koechlin	1878	1915
D from 1887: C3 from 1902: Ed 3/3	157	457	7297	Koechlin	1878	1915
