= Bern–Lucerne railway =

Railway line in Switzerland

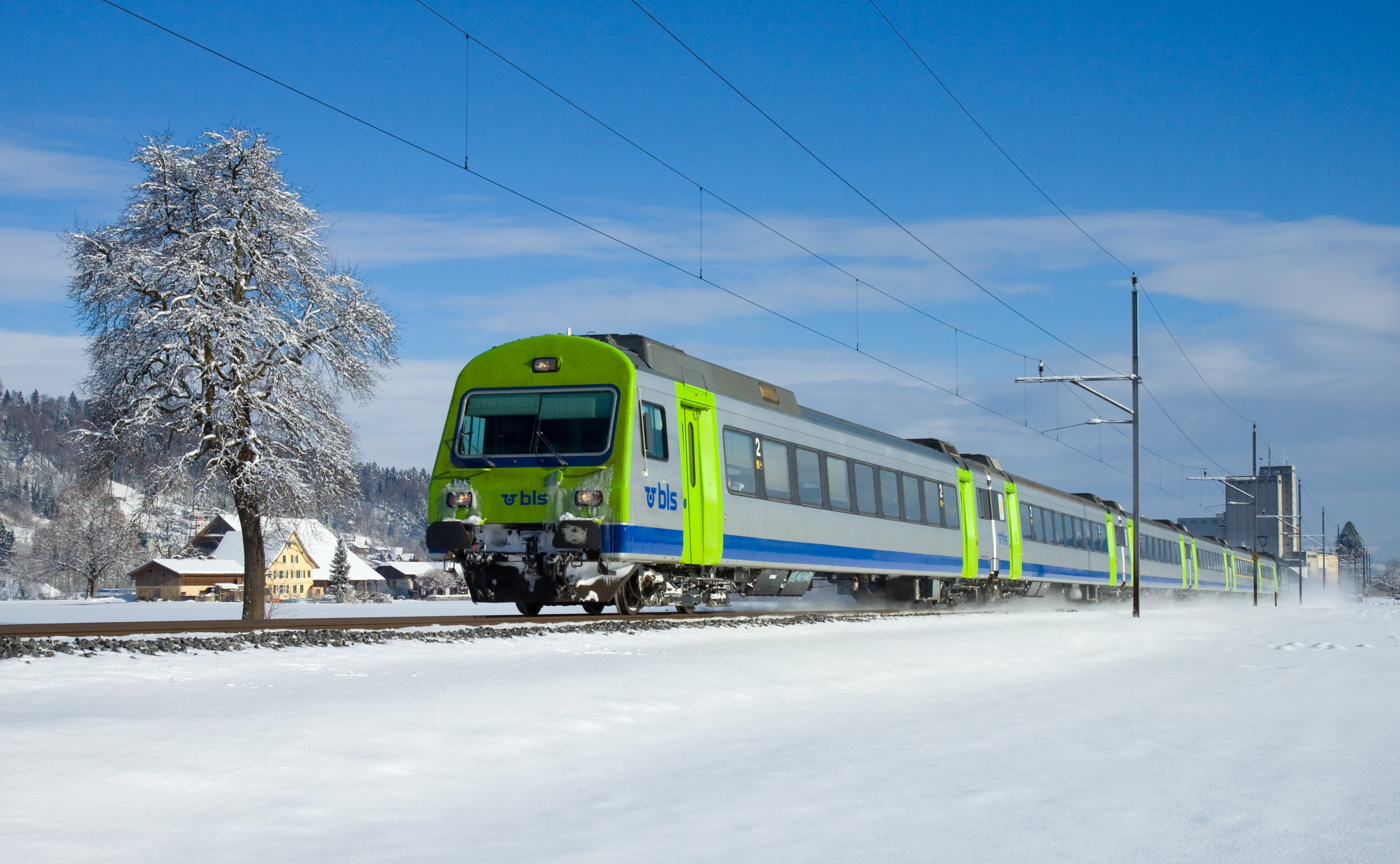
- RegioExpress of BLS passing through Malters

Overview
- Line number: 460
- Locale: Switzerland
- Termini: Bern; Lucerne

Technical
- Line length: 19.20 km (11.93 mi)
- Track gauge: 1,435 mm (4 ft 8 1/2 in)
- Electrification: 15 kV/16.7 Hz AC overhead catenary
- Maximum incline: 1.1%

The Bern–Lucerne railway is a partially double-track, electrified railway through the Entlebuch in Switzerland. The main section between Langnau and Gütsch near Lucerne was opened on 11 August 1875.

== History ==
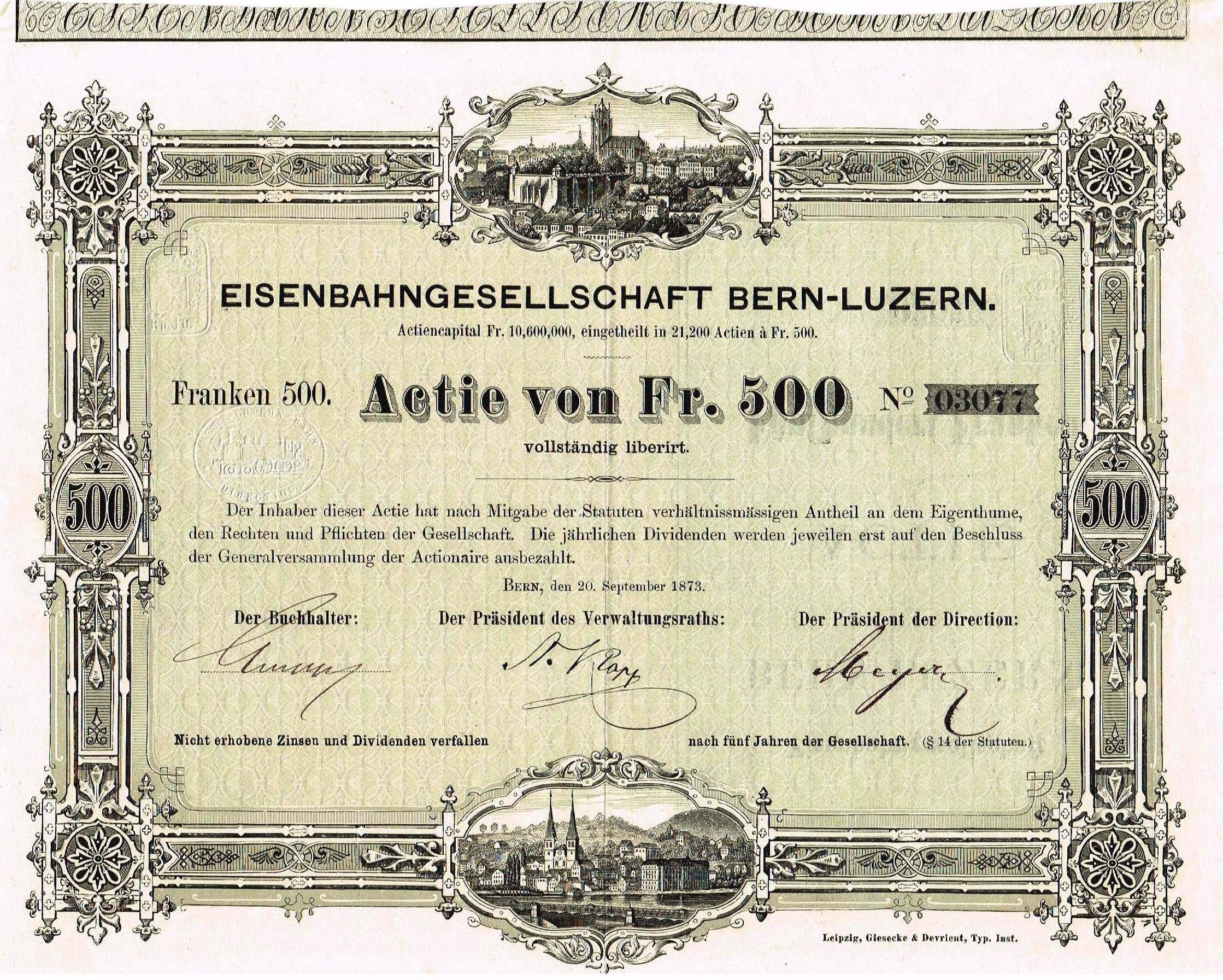
Share certificate of the Bern-Lucerne Railway Company of 20 September 1873

In 1857, the Swiss East–West Railway (Schweizerische Ostwestbahn) planned a railway on the La Neuveville–Biel–Bern–Gümligen–Langnau–Lucerne–Zug–Zürich route with a branch from Zug to Rapperswil, part of which would have formed this line. Since construction had begun without finance having been secured, the company went bankrupt. The canton of Bern took over the Bernese shares of the line and allowed the work to be completed. The Gümligen–Langnau section was opened by the Bern State Railway (Bernische Staatsbahn) on 1 June 1864. The Bern-Lucerne Railway (Bern-Luzern-Bahn, BLB) took over the section in 1875 and opened the remaining section between Gütsch near Lucerne and Langnau on 11 August. Thus, continuous operations between Bern and Lucerne were possible. But because of excessive construction costs, the BLB had become insolvent, forcing it to be taken over in 1877 by the canton of Bern as the main creditor of the BLB. The canton commissioned the Chemins de fer du Jura bernois (Bernese Jura Railways, JB) to manage the company. From 1882, the Bern–Lucerne line was then leased by the JB, which changed its name to the Jura–Bern–Luzern (Jura–Bern–Lucerne Railway, JBL) in 1884. In 1890, the JLB finally went to the newly founded Jura–Simplon Railway (Jura-Simplon-Bahn, JS), which also acquired the Bern–Lucerne line from the canton of Bern. With the nationalisation of the JS in 1902, the Bern–Lucerne line became part of the Swiss Federal Railways (SBB).

After the Bern–Gümligen, Obermatt–Langnau and Gütsch–Lucerne sections had been electrified as parts of other lines as early as 1919 and 1924, the majority of the line was electrified on 15 August 1934. New double-track sections went into operation between Worb and Tägertschi, Konolfingen and Zäziwil and Bowil and Emmenmatt at the timetable change on 12 December 2004, enabling an hourly Bern–Lucerne service on this line.

== Operations ==
Services on line S2 of the Bern S-Bahn between Bern and Langnau run half-hourly and services on line s6 of the Lucerne S-Bahn between Lucerne and Langnau run hourly. The latter is operate as a portion, with the other portion running between Wolhusen and Langenthal. Furthermore, a RegioExpress service runs hourly between Lucerne and Bern, consisting of a Lötschberger class (Ra535) set. Since December 2016, the Regioexpress service has been coupled in Wolhusen with the S7 service from Langenthal to make a second direct connection to Lucerne. Operations of all three lines has been the responsibility of BLS AG since the timetable change in 2010; previously the S6 was operated jointly by BLS and SBB. Until the timetable change in 2004, two-hourly SBB InterRegio services ran from Lucerne to Bern and onto Geneva Airport, stopping in Wolhusen, Langnau and Konolfingen and, at the edges of the day, also in Schüpfheim. Since 2004, these trains have been routed via Zofingen and the Mattstetten–Rothrist new line, to enable a travel time of 60 minutes between Bern and Lucerne. The RegioExpress service was then introduced as a replacement.
