= Jura industriel =

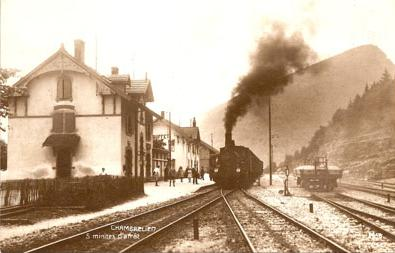
Trains still have to reverse in Chambrelien to overcome the difference in altitude between Neuchâtel and Convers.

The Compagnie du Jura industriel (Jura industrial, JI) is a former Swiss railway company. It existed from 1857 to 1875 and operated the Neuchâtel–Le Locle-Col-des-Roches railway.

The goal of the Jura industriel was to connect the watch industry of the Neuchâtel Jura by rail to Neuchâtel.

== History ==
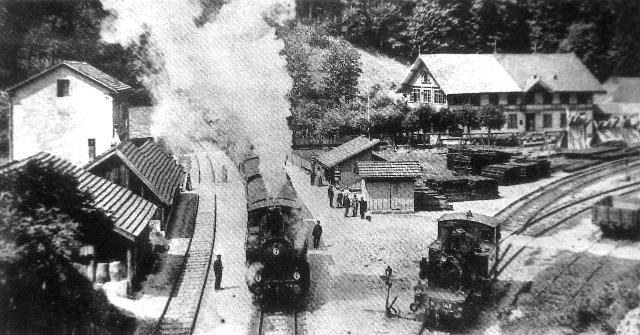
The train, which was taken in Convers, is on its way to Neuchatel. On the right, a locomotive of the Jura–Bern–Luzern is waiting to attach some carriages from La Chaux-de-Fonds to begin a journey to Biel.

In 1853, it became apparent that the canton of Neuchatel wanted to connect the French railway network to the network of the Franco-Swiss Company (Compagnie Franco-Suisse). The Compagnie du Jura industriel received a concession from the canton in 1854 to connect Le Locle and La Chaux-de-Fonds to the Swiss network in Neuchâtel.

Niklaus Riggenbach was appointed as a consultant for the construction of the approximately 40-kilometre-long line. The line from Neuchâtel follows a steady climb of 2.7% to the zig zag in Chambrelien and then along the slopes of the Val de Ruz and through two tunnels up to La Chaux-de-Fonds. From there, the line climbs 2.5% to Le Locle.

Railway construction began in 1854 and the first stage, the 7 kilometre-long line from La-Chaux-de-Fonds to Le Locle, was opened on 2 July 1857.

On 27 November 1859, the line was extended from La Chaux-de-Fonds to Convers at the north portal of the 3259 metre-long Les Loges Tunnel. Four days later, on 1 December, the line was opened from Neuchâtel to Les Hauts-Geneveys at the south portal of the tunnel. From the outskirts of Neuchâtel, the JI was able to use an already-built line intended for the line to Pontarlier. Due to changes in the plans of the Franco-Swiss Company (Compagnie Franco-Suisse) during construction, this section was never used as originally intended. The opening of the whole route from Neuchâtel to Le Locle took place on 15 July 1860.

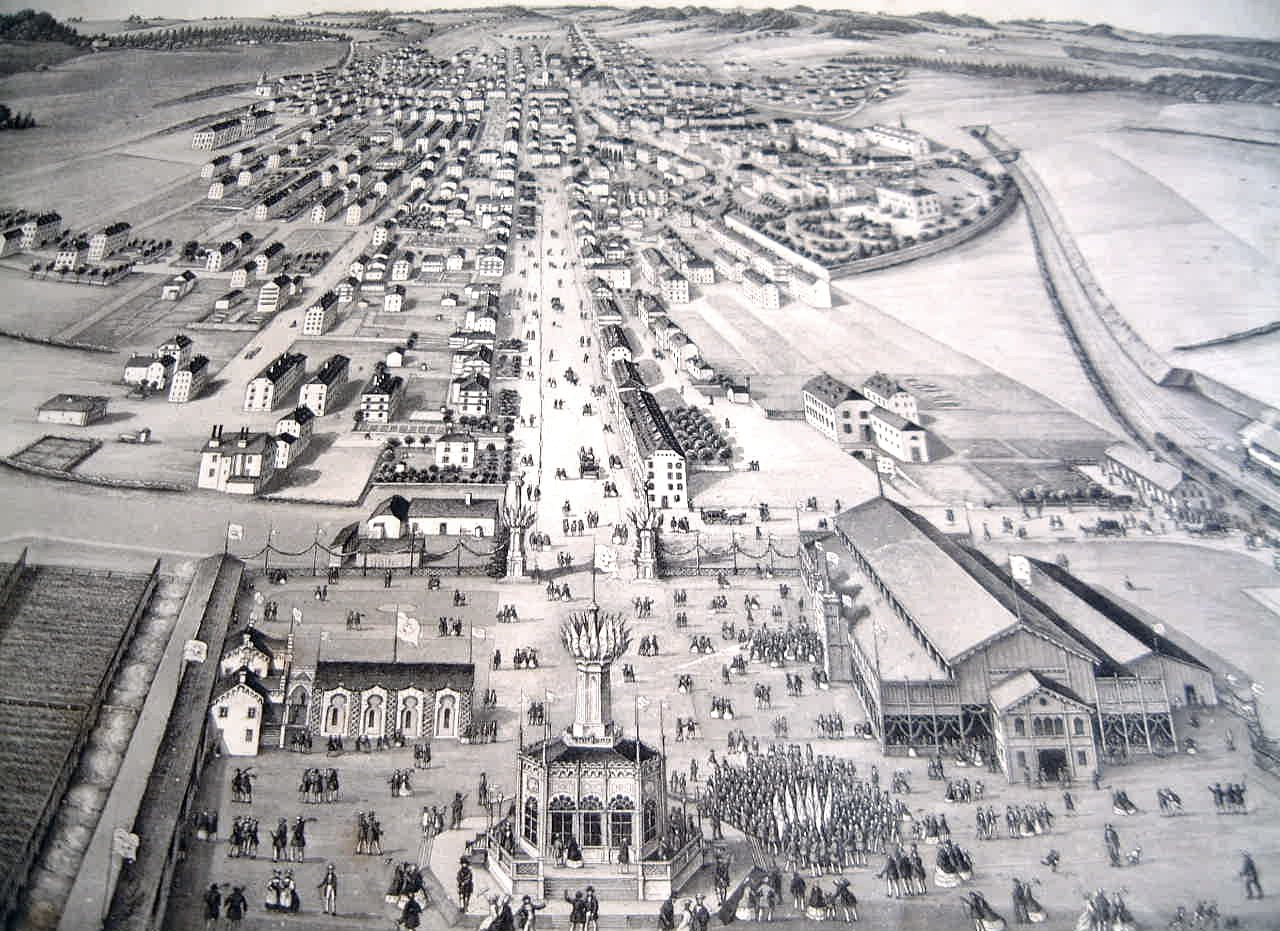
Arrival of the Industrial Jura train in 1863 at La Chaux-de-Fonds for the federal shooting.

In 1863, it was one of the highlights of the Tir fédéral in La Chaux-de-Fonds, bringing shooters from the Swiss Plateau.

The station buildings were all built of wood, except at La Chaux-de-Fonds, which was built out of stone as JI's operations centre.

The company fell into financial difficulties shortly after the completion of the line, not least due to large interest charges, and went bankrupt on 3 January 1861. The canton continued to operate the railway and in January 1865, a new Jura industriel company was established to succeed it. Ten years later, the Neuchâtel voters rejected the repurchase of the railway and the company decided on 1 May 1875 to sell itself to the Chemins de fer du Jura bernois (JB), which was founded on 30 April 1874. The JB was later renamed the Jura-Bern-Luzern (JBL).

The planned extensions of the line from Le Locle to the Col des Roches and on to Besançon was opened in 1884. The Chemin de fer Régional des Brenets (RdB) commenced operations on its narrow-gauge line between Le Locle and Les Brenets in 1890.

The JBL apparently did not live up to local expectations and a referendum on 29 June 1884 led to the canton buying back the line. Operations were transferred to the Jura neuchâtelois company on 1 January 1886.

== Rolling stock ==
The Jura industriel rolling stock consisted exclusively of Engerth locomotives, which had proven their worth elsewhere on steep grades. Since the first three locomotives by no means met the requirements due to their weak traction, they were later used on other lines and for shunting from 1877 and scrapped early.

Class	JI no.	Name	JBL no. from 1875	JN no. from 1886	SBB no. from 1913	Manufacturer	Construction year	Scrapped	Image
A from 1875: AI from 1887: B2E (from 1902: Ec 2/5)	1	Le Père Fritz	41	–	–	Esslingen	1856	1883	Ed 2/5
A from 1875: AI from 1887: B2E (from 1902: Ec 2/5)	2	Le Jura	42	42	–	Esslingen	1856	1888	Ed 2/5
A from 1875: AI from 1887: B2E (from 1902: Ec 2/5)	3	Jean Richard	43	–	–	Esslingen	1858	1883	Ed 2/5
B from 1875: CI from 1887: D3E from 1902: Ed 3/5	4	Père Vielle	141	141	–	Workshop of the SCB	1859	1905	E 3/5
B from 1875: CI from 1887: D3E from 1902: Ed 3/5	5	Montagnarde	142	142	–	Workshop of the SCB	1859	1898	E 3/5
B from 1875: CI from 1887: D3E from 1902: Ed 3/5	7	Vignoble	143	143	–	Workshop of the SCB	1859	1904	E 3/5
B from 1875: CI from 1887: D3E from 1902: Ed 3/5	6	Chaux-de-Fonds	144	144	8799	Esslingen	1873	1914	Ed 3/5
B from 1875: CI from 1887: D3E from 1902: Ed 3/5	8	Locle	145	145	–	Esslingen	1873	1912	Ed 3/5

Due to financial difficulties the JI could not fully pay for locomotives B numbers 4 to 7, which it had ordered, so the SCB retained locomotive number 6 and used it itself.
