= Swiss East–West Railway =

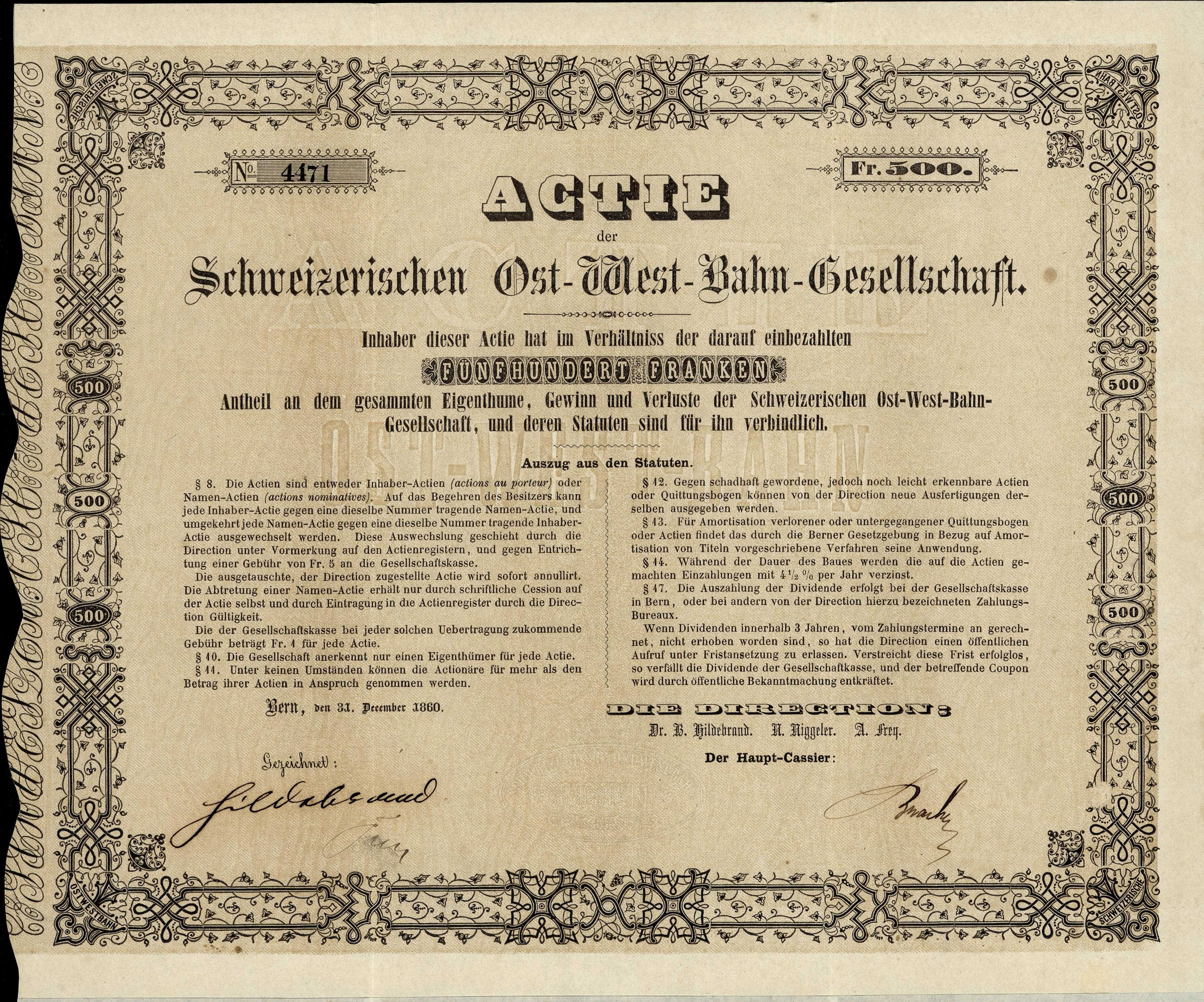
Share of the Schweizerische Ost-West-Bahn-Gesellschaft, issued 31 December 1860

The Swiss East–West Railway (German: Schweizerische Ostwestbahn, OWB) was a former Swiss rail company, which planned to build a line to compete with the network of the Swiss Central Railway (German: Schweizerische Centralbahn, SCB) in central Switzerland on which construction commenced in 1857.

Jakob Stämpfli, a federal politician, established the company to build a line between La Neuveville (on Lake Biel in western Switzerland) and Zürich via Bern, Langnau im Emmental, Luzern and Zug. It began construction without raising sufficient finance to guarantee its completion. It opened a line between Frienisberg (near Le Landeron) and Biel (now part of the Jura foot line on 3 December 1860, but then went bankrupt. The completed section from La Neuveville and Langnau line was taken over by the canton of Bern and incorporated as the Bernese State Railway (German: Bernische Staatsbahn, BSB) in June 1861, which continued building the line to Lucerne. The concession for the section from Lucerne to Zürich via Affoltern am Albis was bought out of the bankrupt estate by the Swiss Northeast Railway (German: Schweizerische Nordostbahn) and established as a subsidiary, the Zürich–Zug–Lucerne Railway (German: Zürich–Zug–Luzern-Bahn, ZZL). Construction of the line was completed in 1864 and shortly later it was connected to SCB's Olten–Lucerne line to Lucerne station, which had opened in 1856 on the edge of the lake, across the Reuss from the centre of the town. Part of this line now forms part of the Zug–Lucerne railway.
