= Langnau im Emmental =

- Municipality
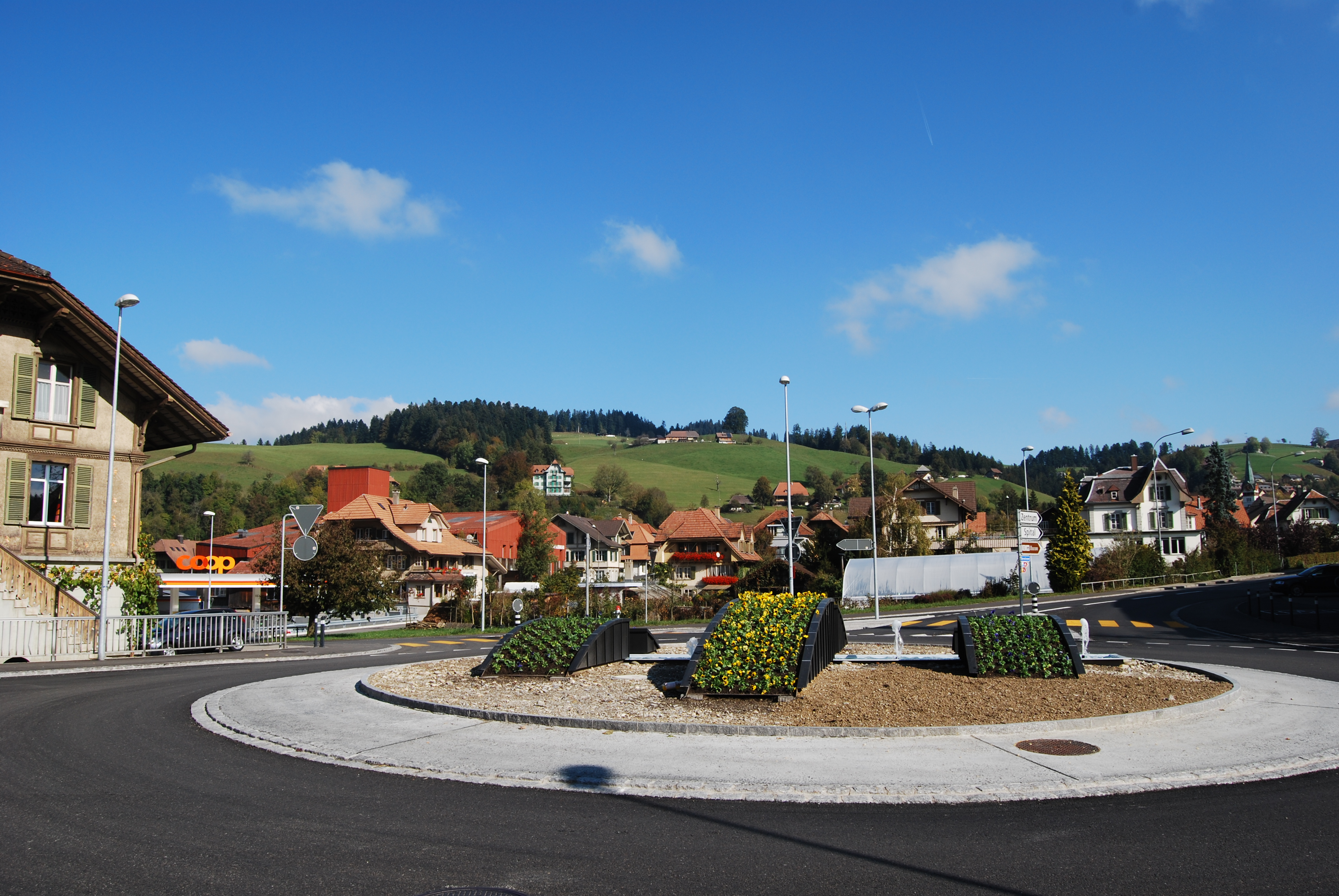

- Flag Coat of arms
- Location of Langnau im Emmental
- Location within Switzerland Location within Canton of Bern
- Coordinates: 46°57′N 7°47′E
- Country: Switzerland
- Canton: Bern
- District: Emmental

Government
  - Executive: Gemeinderat with 9 members
  - Mayor: Gemeindepräsident; Walter Sutter SVP/UDC (as of 2026)
  - Parliament: Grosser Gemeinderat with 40 members

Area
  - Total: 48 km^{2} (19 sq mi)
- Elevation: 736 m (2,415 ft)
- Highest elevation: 1,332 m (4,370 ft)
- Lowest elevation: 643 m (2,110 ft)

Population (Dec 2012)
  - Total: 9,092
  - Density: 190/km^{2} (490/sq mi)
- Time zone: UTC+01:00 (CET)
  - Summer (DST): UTC+02:00 (CEST)
- Postal code: 3550
- SFOS number: 902
- ISO 3166 code: CH-BE
- Surrounded by: Eggiwil, Lauperswil, Signau, Sumiswald, Trachselwald, Trub, Trubschachen
- Website: www.langnau-ie.ch

Langnau im Emmental (German pronunciation: [ˈlaŋˌnaʊ̯ ɪm ˈɛməntaːl]) is a municipality in the administrative district of Emmental in the canton of Bern in Switzerland.

It is situated in the upper Emmental between Bern and Lucerne.

It has about 9,000 inhabitants and is the most important market place in the region. It is set among rolling hills. The average temperature is 7.1 °C (44.8 °F), and the average precipitation is 1,371 mm (54.0 in). The village is one of the sunniest in Switzerland, with practically no fog.

== History ==
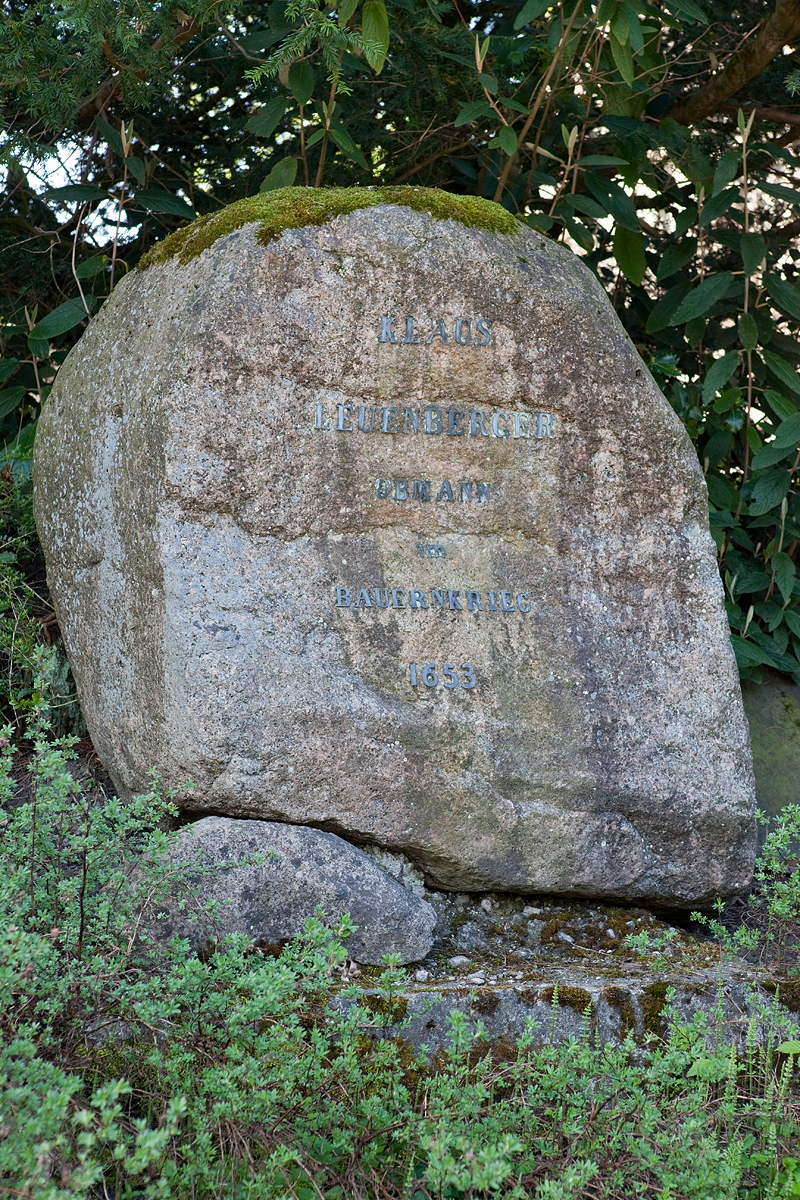
Memorial to Klaus Leuenberger, a leader of the farmers' uprising

Aerial view from 600 m by Walter Mittelholzer (1927)

There are no signs of human inhabitants before the German migration in about the 11th century. The first mention of the name Langnau (German lange Au or Lanngnouw meaning long pasture/meadow) dates to 1139. In 1246 it was mentioned as Langenowe.

Like other towns in the Emmental, Langnau was not built along the river because of the danger of flooding. Instead, it was built on higher ground along one of the streams flowing into the Emme.

The earliest noble landowners seem to have been the Kyburg family. A fort was erected on the Spitzenegg hill in Gohl by the barons of Spitzenberg. This fortification was sold to the sons of Rudolf von Habsburg in 1300. A Benedictine monastery was established in Trub in 1130, and it held ownership of large tracts of land.

After the Battle of Sempach in 1386, where the Swiss Confederation defeated the troops led by Duke Leopold III of Habsburg, the Bernese established their authority over the area. However, there were continued clashes with the authorities in Lucerne. In 1528, Bern imposed the Protestant religion on the entire region.

In 1653, there was a farmers' insurrection due to the economic crisis after the end of the Thirty Years' War and the persecution of the Anabaptists (Mennonites). The insurrection was put down, and persecution continued until about 1730. Many Anabaptists left the area to settle in the Jura Mountains.

In the 18th century, Langnau was an important center of the canvas and cheese trades. It was larger than any other town in the area, including Burgdorf. The railroad reached Langnau in 1864 from Bern, and continued to Lucerne in 1875. With the opening of the Gotthard line in 1882, the line through Langnau became the fastest access route to the south until the opening of the Lötschberg Tunnel in 1913.

== Geography ==
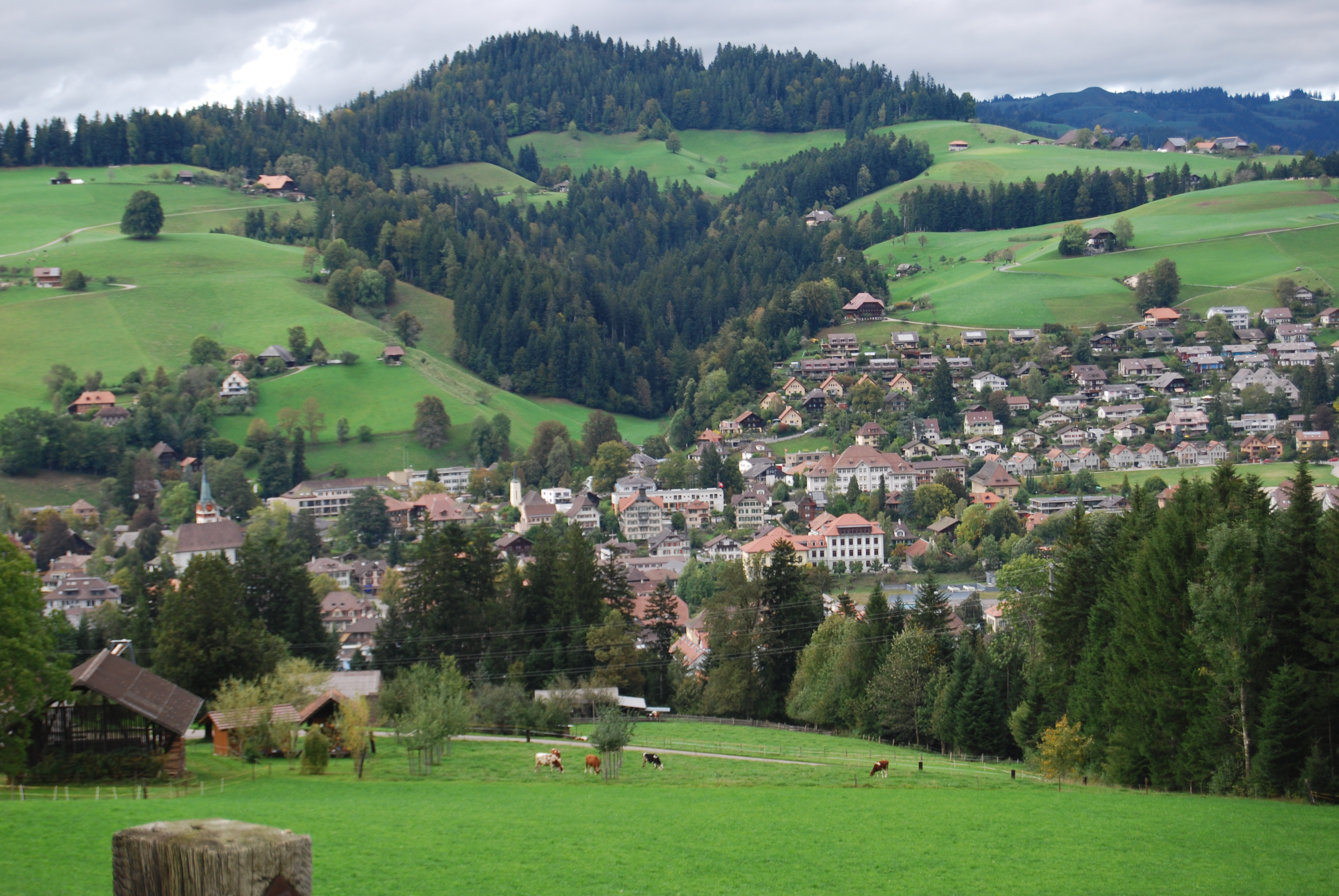
Langnau village

Langnau im Emmental has an area of 48.36 km^{2} (18.67 sq mi). As of 2012, a total of 24.14 km^{2} (9.32 mi^{2}) or 49.9% is used for agricultural purposes, while 20.34 km^{2} (7.85 mi^{2}) or 42.0% is forested. The rest of the municipality is 3.67 km^{2} (1.42 mi^{2}) or 7.6% is settled (buildings or roads), 0.21 km^{2} (0.081 mi^{2}) or 0.4% is either rivers or lakes and 0.11 km^{2} (27 acres) or 0.2% is unproductive land.

During the same year, housing and buildings made up 4.0% and transportation infrastructure made up 2.3%. A total of 39.3% of the total land area is heavily forested and 2.7% is covered with orchards or small clusters of trees. Of the agricultural land, 9.2% is used for growing crops and 33.6% is pasturage, while 1.1% is used for orchards or vine crops and 6.0% is used for alpine pastures. All the water in the municipality is flowing water.

The widely spread municipality is located on both sides of the Ilfis river and stretches to Napf mountain. It consists of the village of Langnau im Emmental and the hamlets that make up the seven parts of the Langnau parish; Langnau-Dorf, Frittenbach, Ilfis, Hühnerbach, Grossviertel (including Bärau), Rigenen and Gohl as well as about 20 alpine herding camps and meadows.

On 31 December 2009 Amtsbezirk Signau, the municipality's former district, was dissolved. On the following day, 1 January 2010, it joined the newly created Verwaltungskreis Emmental.

== Coat of arms ==
The blazon of the municipal coat of arms is Gules three Fir Trees Vert trunked Or issuant from a Mount of 3 Coupeaux of the second.

== Demographics ==
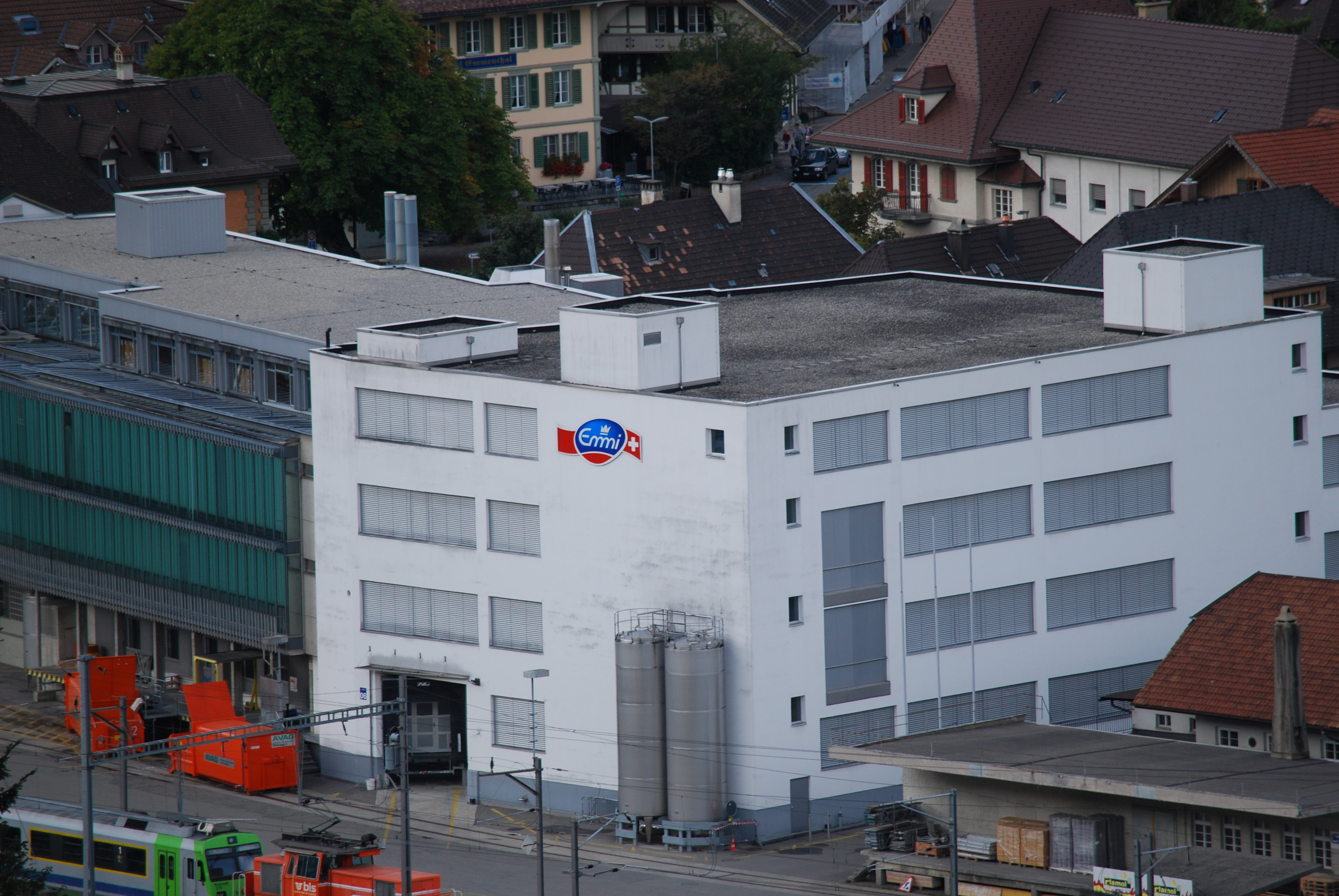
Emmi AG factory in Langnau

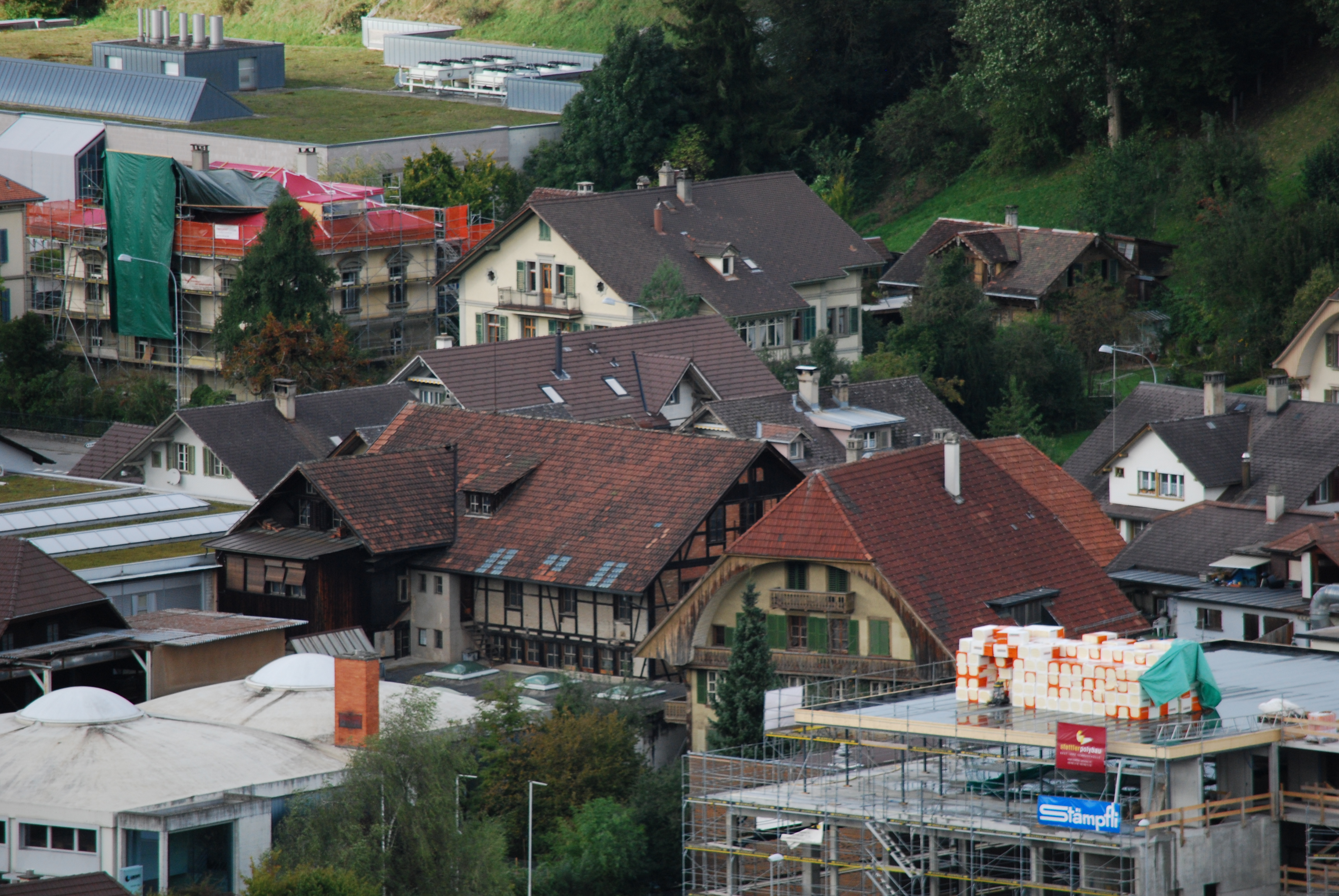
Old village center in Langnau

Langnau im Emmental has a population (as of December 2020) of 9,262. As of 2012, 6.3% of the population are resident foreign nationals. Between the last 2 years (2010-2012) the population changed at a rate of 0.8%. Migration accounted for 0.4%, while births and deaths accounted for 0.0%.

Most of the population (as of 2000) speaks German (8,612 or 94.1%) as their first language, Albanian is the second most common (133 or 1.5%) and Italian is the third (80 or 0.9%). There are 35 people who speak French and 7 people who speak Romansh.

As of 2008, the population was 48.1% male and 51.9% female. The population was made up of 4,053 Swiss men (44.9% of the population) and 281 (3.1%) non-Swiss men. There were 4,434 Swiss women (49.2%) and 249 (2.8%) non-Swiss women. Of the population in the municipality, 3,765 or about 41.2% were born in Langnau im Emmental and lived there in 2000. There were 3,075 or 33.6% who were born in the same canton, while 987 or 10.8% were born somewhere else in Switzerland, and 759 or 8.3% were born outside of Switzerland.

As of 2012, children and teenagers (0–19 years old) make up 21.6% of the population, while adults (20–64 years old) make up 59.3% and seniors (over 64 years old) make up 19.0%.

As of 2000, there were 4,033 people who were single and never married in the municipality. There were 4,082 married individuals, 690 widows or widowers and 343 individuals who are divorced.

As of 2010, there were 1,228 households that consist of only one person and 280 households with five or more people. In 2000, a total of 3,369 apartments (88.8% of the total) were permanently occupied, while 290 apartments (7.6%) were seasonally occupied and 137 apartments (3.6%) were empty. As of 2012, the construction rate of new housing units was 4.2 new units per 1000 residents. The vacancy rate for the municipality, in 2013, was 0.2%. In 2011, single family homes made up 36.9% of the total housing in the municipality.

The historical population is given in the following chart:

== Heritage sites of national significance ==
The farm house Dürsrüti, the Chüechli House and the Swiss Reformed church are listed as Swiss heritage site of national significance. The entire urbanized village of Langnau im Emmental is part of the Inventory of Swiss Heritage Sites.

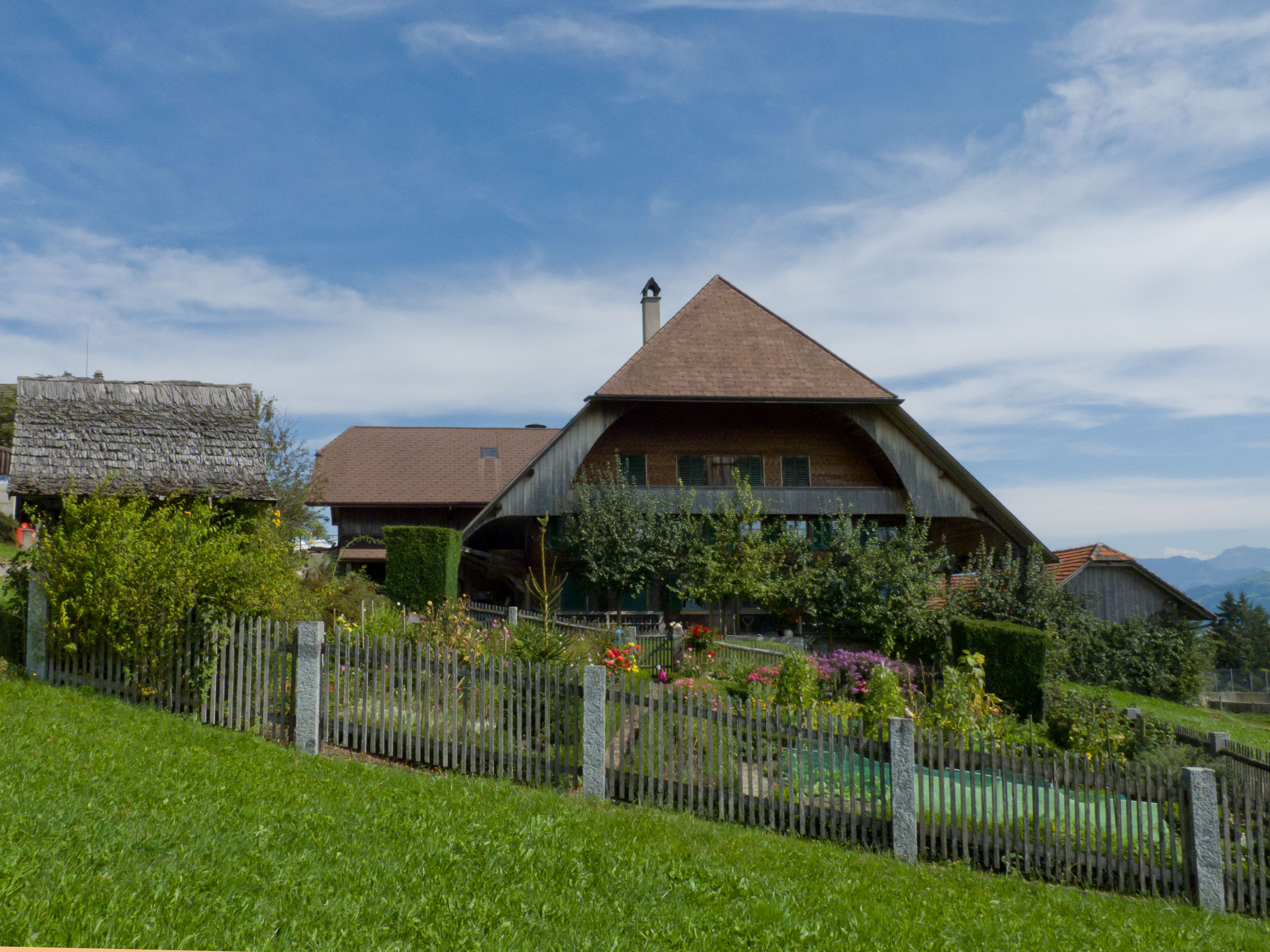
The Dürsrüti house

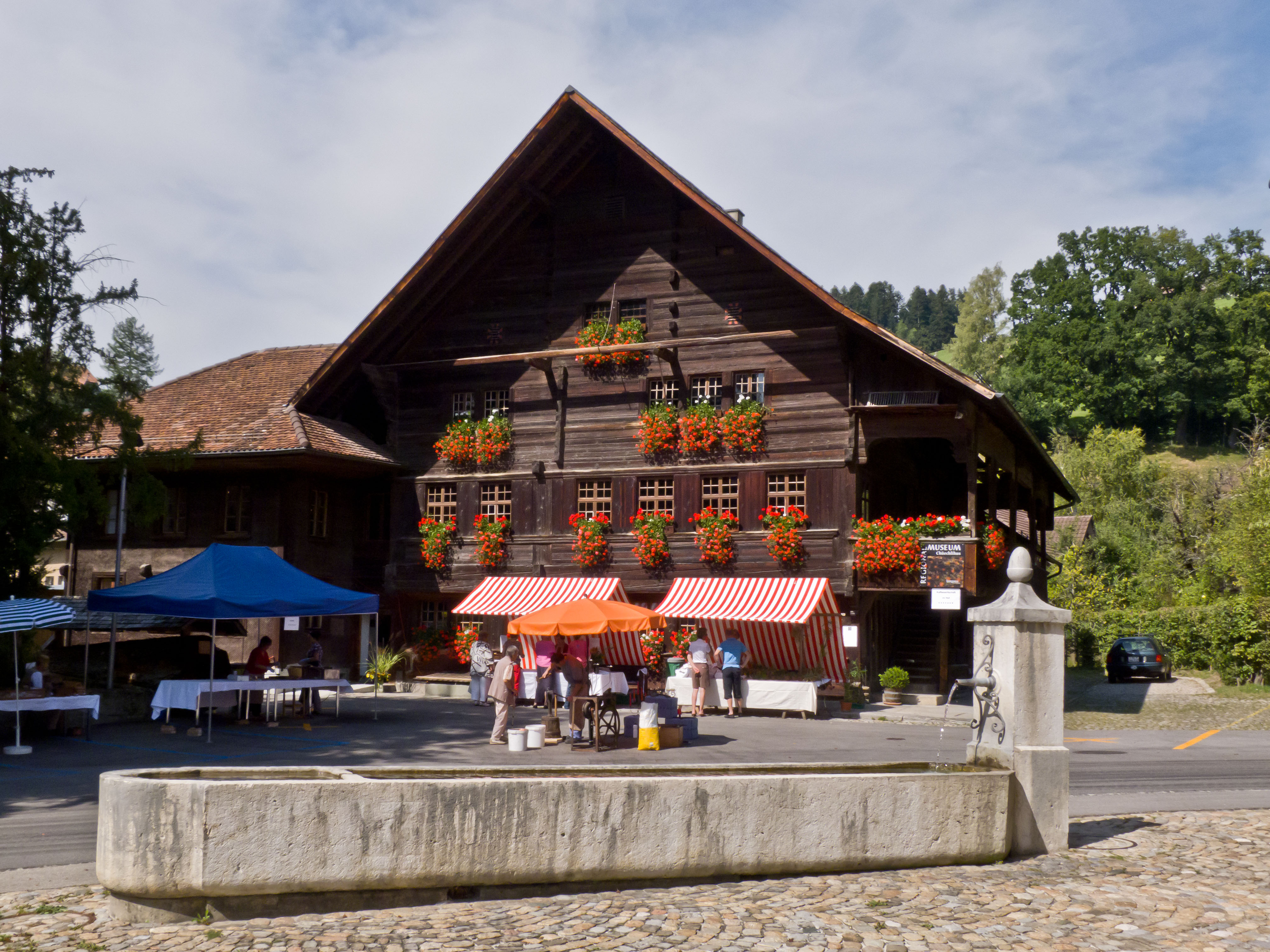
The Chüechlihus house and village fountain

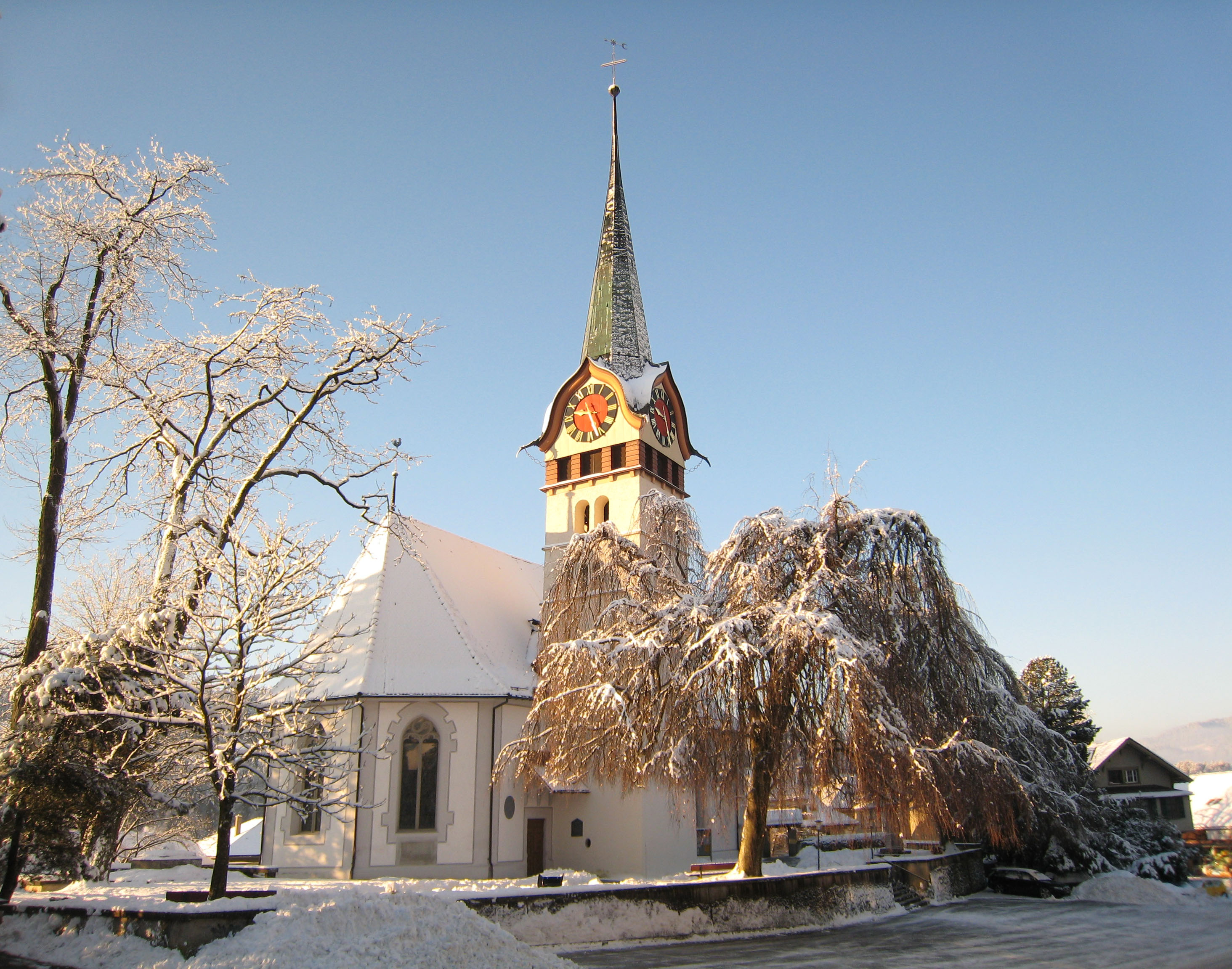
Swiss Reformed church in Langnau

== Culture ==
The Regional Museum is housed in the oldest house in Langnau, which was built before 1600.

Among the cultural events in Langnau are the Langnau Jazz Nights and the International Cartoon Festival. Langnau has also got its Markets six times in a year.

== Politics ==
In the 2011 federal election the most popular party was the Swiss People's Party (SVP) which received 31.0% of the vote. The next three most popular parties were the Social Democratic Party (SP) (19.9%), the Conservative Democratic Party (BDP) (16.0%) and the Green Party (9.5%). In the federal election, a total of 3,502 votes were cast, and the voter turnout was 49.1%.

== Economy ==
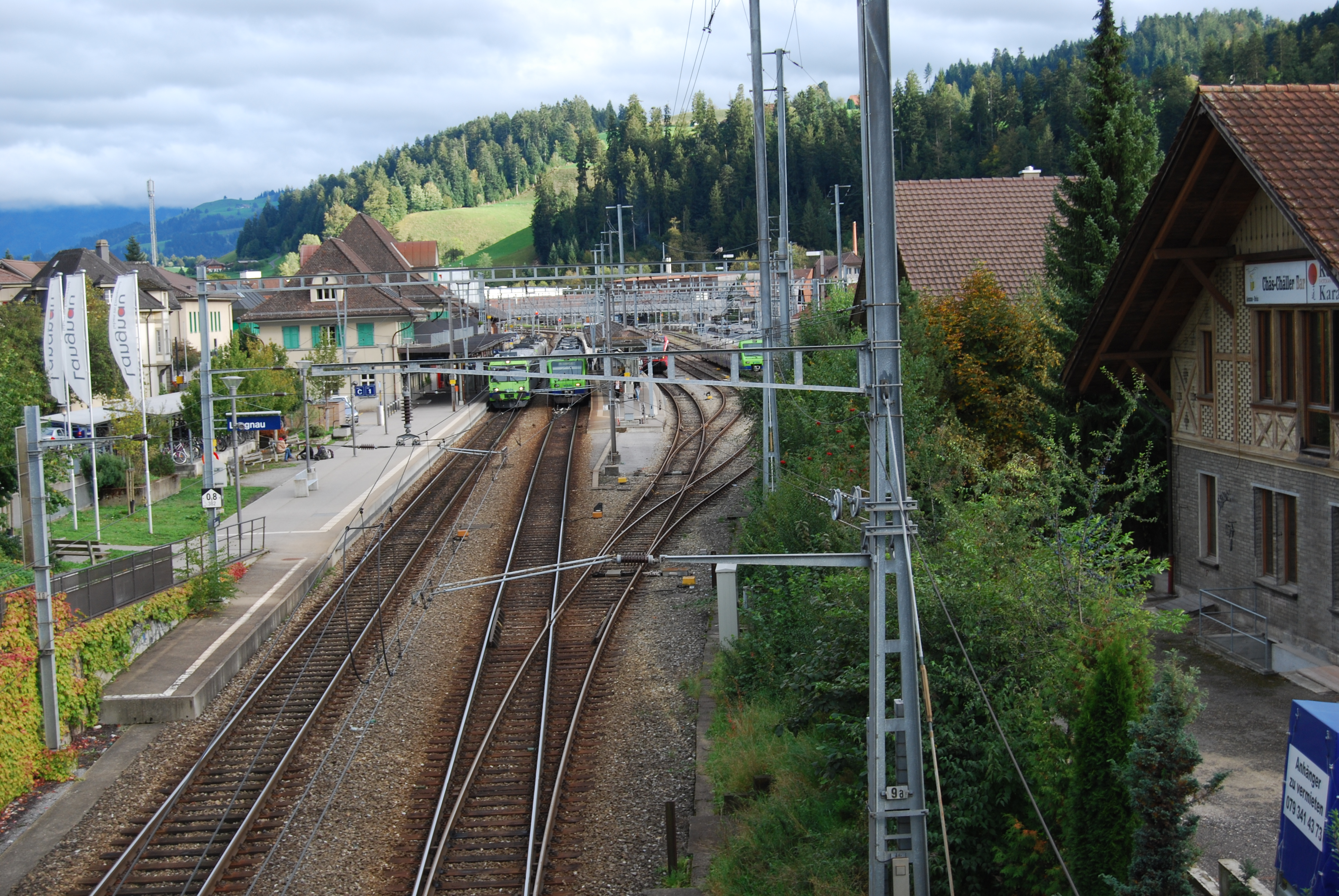
Langnau railroad station

The economy of Langnau is broad-based, including manufacturing, trade, tourism, and agriculture, particularly dairy farming. The commercial sector is characterized by agriculture and forestry, wood-processing companies, a factory for fresh, processed and fondue cheese production, a meat processing center with a modern slaughterhouse, as well as small and medium-sized industrial enterprises.

As of 2011, Langnau im Emmental had an unemployment rate of 1.72%. As of 2011, there were a total of 5,881 people employed in the municipality. Of these, there were 561 people employed in the primary economic sector and about 181 businesses involved in this sector. 1,525 people were employed in the secondary sector and there were 126 businesses in this sector. 3,795 people were employed in the tertiary sector, with 477 businesses in this sector. There were 4,587 residents of the municipality who were employed in some capacity, of which females made up 45.0% of the workforce.

In 2008 there were a total of 4,181 full-time equivalent jobs. The number of jobs in the primary sector was 351, of which 349 were in agriculture and 2 were in forestry or lumber production. The number of jobs in the secondary sector was 1,281 of which 807 or (63.0%) were in manufacturing and 442 (34.5%) were in construction. The number of jobs in the tertiary sector was 2,549. In the tertiary sector; 666 or 26.1% were in wholesale or retail sales or the repair of motor vehicles, 125 or 4.9% were in the movement and storage of goods, 135 or 5.3% were in a hotel or restaurant, 46 or 1.8% were in the information industry, 76 or 3.0% were the insurance or financial industry, 131 or 5.1% were technical professionals or scientists, 104 or 4.1% were in education and 1,001 or 39.3% were in health care.

In 2000, there were 2,660 workers who commuted into the municipality and 1,677 workers who commuted away. The municipality is a net importer of workers, with about 1.6 workers entering the municipality for every one leaving. A total of 2,910 workers (52.2% of the 5,570 total workers in the municipality) both lived and worked in Langnau im Emmental. Of the working population, 16.9% used public transportation to get to work, and 40.1% used a private car.

In 2011 the average local and cantonal tax rate on a married resident, with two children, of Langnau im Emmental making 150,000 CHF was 12.8%, while an unmarried resident's rate was 18.8%. For comparison, the average rate for the entire canton in the same year, was 14.2% and 22.0%, while the nationwide average was 12.3% and 21.1% respectively.

In 2009 there were a total of 3,950 tax payers in the municipality. Of that total, 1,066 made over 75,000 CHF per year. There were 37 people who made between 15,000 and 20,000 per year. The greatest number of workers, 1,089, made between 50,000 and 75,000 CHF per year. The average income of the over 75,000 CHF group in Langnau im Emmental was 114,995 CHF, while the average across all of Switzerland was 130,478 CHF.

In 2011 a total of 3.5% of the population received direct financial assistance from the government.

== Religion ==
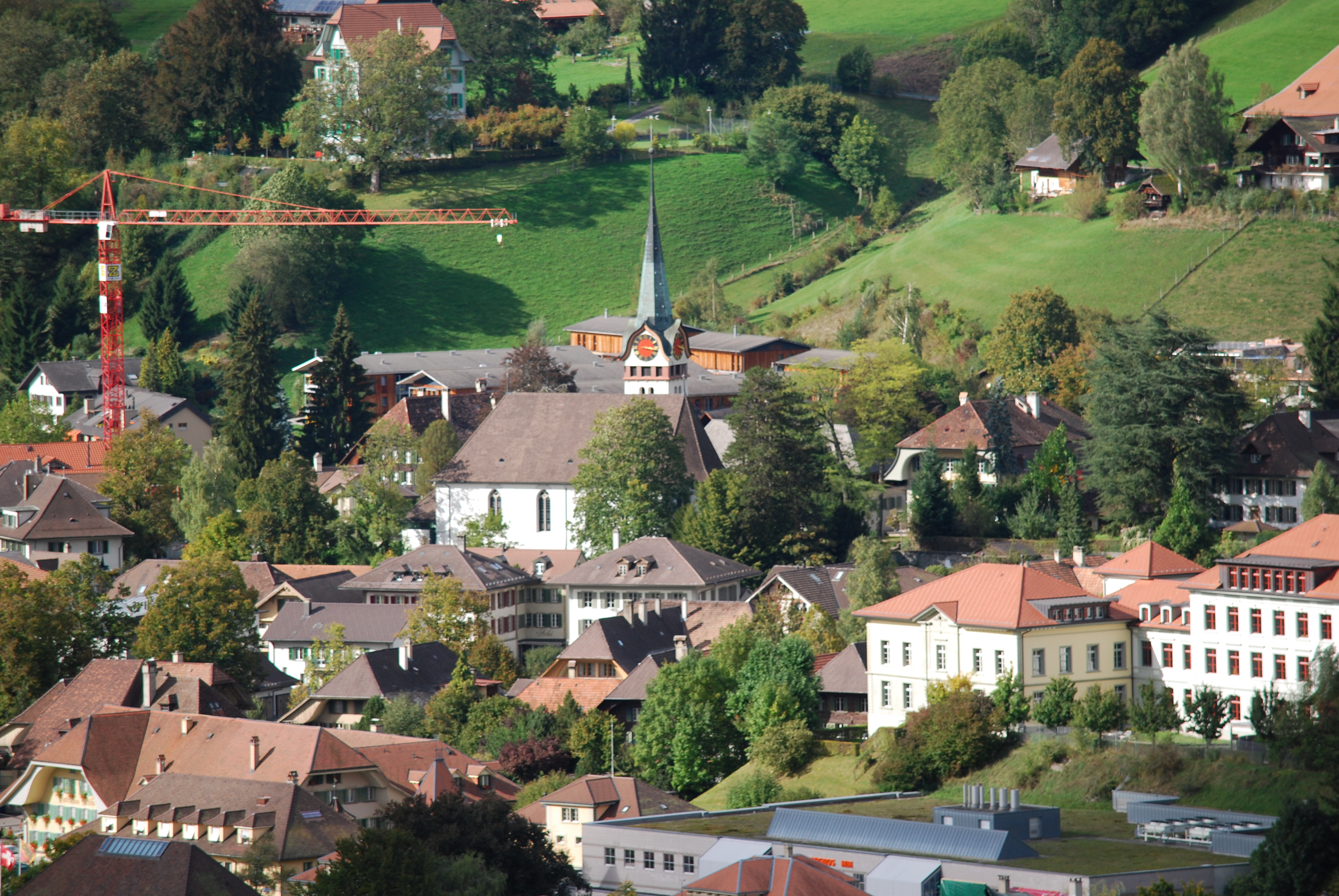
Swiss Reformed church in the old village

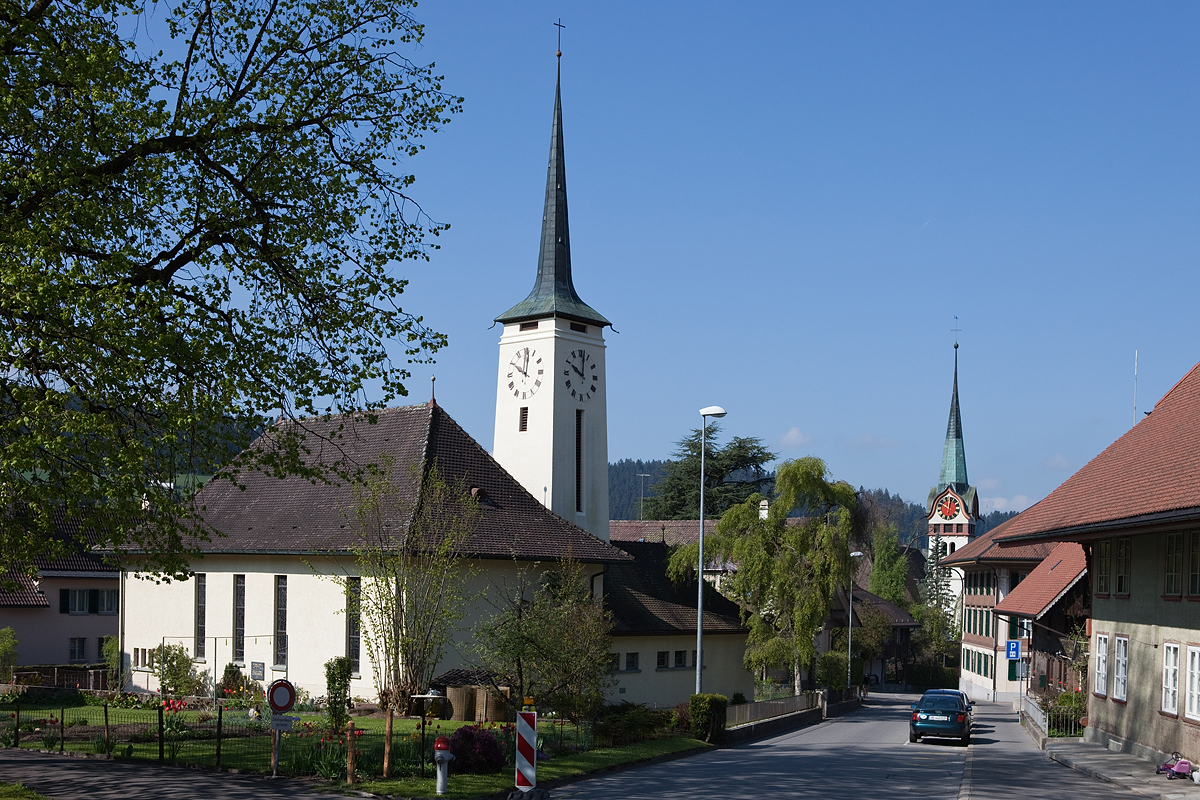
Catholic church in Langnau

From the 2000 census, 6,774 or 74.0% belonged to the Swiss Reformed Church, while 668 or 7.3% were Roman Catholic. Of the rest of the population, there were 59 members of an Orthodox church (or about 0.64% of the population), there was 1 individual who belongs to the Christian Catholic Church, and there were 519 individuals (or about 5.67% of the population) who belonged to another Christian church. There were 8 individuals (or about 0.09% of the population) who were Jewish, and 265 (or about 2.90% of the population) who were Muslim. There were 7 individuals who were Buddhist, 136 individuals who were Hindu and 6 individuals who belonged to another church. 406 (or about 4.44% of the population) belonged to no church, are agnostic or atheist, and 299 individuals (or about 3.27% of the population) did not answer the question. Langnau also is home to the oldest still worshiping evangelical church that is independent of the government. Only in 1888 where they able to build their own church building without persecution. Before the Alttäufergemeinde Emmental / Mennonite met in hideouts and 45 farm houses. www.atg-emmental.ch

== Education ==
In Langnau im Emmental about 54.8% of the population have completed non-mandatory upper secondary education, and 14.7% have completed additional higher education (either university or a Fachhochschule). Of the 785 who had completed some form of tertiary schooling listed in the census, 73.8% were Swiss men, 20.0% were Swiss women, 4.1% were non-Swiss men and 2.2% were non-Swiss women.

The Canton of Bern school system provides one year of non-obligatory Kindergarten, followed by six years of Primary school. This is followed by three years of obligatory lower Secondary school where the students are separated according to ability and aptitude. Following the lower Secondary students may attend additional schooling or they may enter an apprenticeship.

During the 2011-12 school year, there were a total of 1,156 students attending classes in Langnau im Emmental. There were 9 kindergarten classes with a total of 155 students in the municipality. Of the kindergarten students, 8.4% were permanent or temporary residents of Switzerland (not citizens) and 18.7% have a different mother language than the classroom language. The municipality had 27 primary classes and 528 students. Of the primary students, 7.6% were permanent or temporary residents of Switzerland (not citizens) and 14.8% have a different mother language than the classroom language. During the same year, there were 19 lower secondary classes with a total of 332 students. There were 9.6% who were permanent or temporary residents of Switzerland (not citizens) and 16.3% have a different mother language than the classroom language. The remainder of the students attend a private or special school.

As of 2000, there were a total of 1,370 students attending any school in the municipality. Of those, 1,158 both lived and attended school in the municipality, while 212 students came from another municipality. During the same year, 210 residents attended schools outside the municipality. A total of 2 students from Langnau im Emmental attended schools outside Switzerland.

Langnau im Emmental is home to the Regionalbibliothek Langnau library. The library has (as of 2008) 21,478 books or other media, and loaned out 162,909 items in the same year. It was open a total of 221 days with average of 25 hours per week during that year.

== Climate ==
Climate data for Langnau i.E., elevation 744 m (2,441 ft), (1991–2020)
Month	Jan	Feb	Mar	Apr	May	Jun	Jul	Aug	Sep	Oct	Nov	Dec	Year
Mean daily maximum °C (°F)	3.0 (37.4)	4.6 (40.3)	9.0 (48.2)	12.9 (55.2)	17.2 (63.0)	21.0 (69.8)	23.0 (73.4)	22.6 (72.7)	18.2 (64.8)	13.5 (56.3)	7.2 (45.0)	3.5 (38.3)	13.0 (55.4)
Daily mean °C (°F)	−0.6 (30.9)	0.1 (32.2)	4.0 (39.2)	7.6 (45.7)	11.7 (53.1)	15.4 (59.7)	17.1 (62.8)	16.8 (62.2)	12.9 (55.2)	8.7 (47.7)	3.4 (38.1)	0.2 (32.4)	8.1 (46.6)
Mean daily minimum °C (°F)	−3.9 (25.0)	−3.8 (25.2)	−0.6 (30.9)	2.3 (36.1)	6.4 (43.5)	10.0 (50.0)	11.7 (53.1)	11.6 (52.9)	8.2 (46.8)	4.8 (40.6)	0.1 (32.2)	−3.0 (26.6)	3.7 (38.7)
Average precipitation mm (inches)	73.1 (2.88)	69.8 (2.75)	81.7 (3.22)	96.4 (3.80)	148.5 (5.85)	153.7 (6.05)	155.9 (6.14)	154.4 (6.08)	108.8 (4.28)	94.0 (3.70)	84.2 (3.31)	91.8 (3.61)	1,312.3 (51.67)
Average snowfall cm (inches)	25.6 (10.1)	28.7 (11.3)	13.8 (5.4)	7.2 (2.8)	0.0 (0.0)	0.0 (0.0)	0.0 (0.0)	0.0 (0.0)	0.0 (0.0)	2.4 (0.9)	10.0 (3.9)	26.7 (10.5)	114.4 (45.0)
Average precipitation days (≥ 1.0 mm)	10.7	10.0	11.3	11.4	13.6	13.5	13.0	12.1	10.3	10.9	10.9	11.9	139.6
Average snowy days (≥ 1.0 cm)	4.6	5.0	2.9	1.4	0.0	0.0	0.0	0.0	0.0	0.1	2.1	4.6	20.7
Average relative humidity (%)	86	84	78	76	77	75	75	77	82	86	89	88	81
Source 1: NOAA
Source 2: MeteoSwiss

== Sport ==
Langnau is known throughout Switzerland as a hockey town and is home to the SCL Tigers, which play in the National League (NL). They play their home games at the Ilfis Stadium. They have a rivalry with SC Bern which plays 30 kilometers away in the capital city.

== Notable people ==
- Florent Hadergjonaj, footballer representing the Kosovo national team
- Lia Wälti, footballer for Arsenal and captain of the Switzerland national team
- Noemi Zbären, is a hurdler. at the European U23 Championships 100 m hurdles, she won the gold medal, at the 2012 Summer Olympics, she competed in the Women's 100 metres hurdles, coming 6th in her heat with a time of 13.33 seconds.
- Hans Schwarzenbach, Equestrian
