= Jura–Simplon Railways =

Swiss rail company

History
- Opened: merger 1890
- Closed: to SBB 1903

Technical
- Track gauge: 1,435 mm (4 ft 8 1/2 in) standard gauge

The Jura–Simplon Railways (JS), (French: Compagnie des Chemins de Fer Jura–Simplon) was a railway company that was formed in 1890. It was nationalised in 1903 as the largest railway company in Switzerland and integrated into the Swiss Federal Railways (SBB).

== History ==
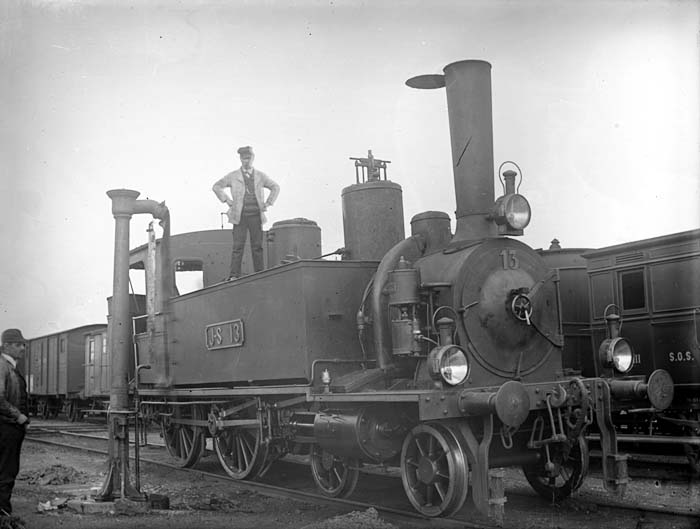
Eb 2/4 No. 13 at a water crane. The wagon in the background still bears the inscription: S.O.S. (Suisse-Occidentale-Simplon)

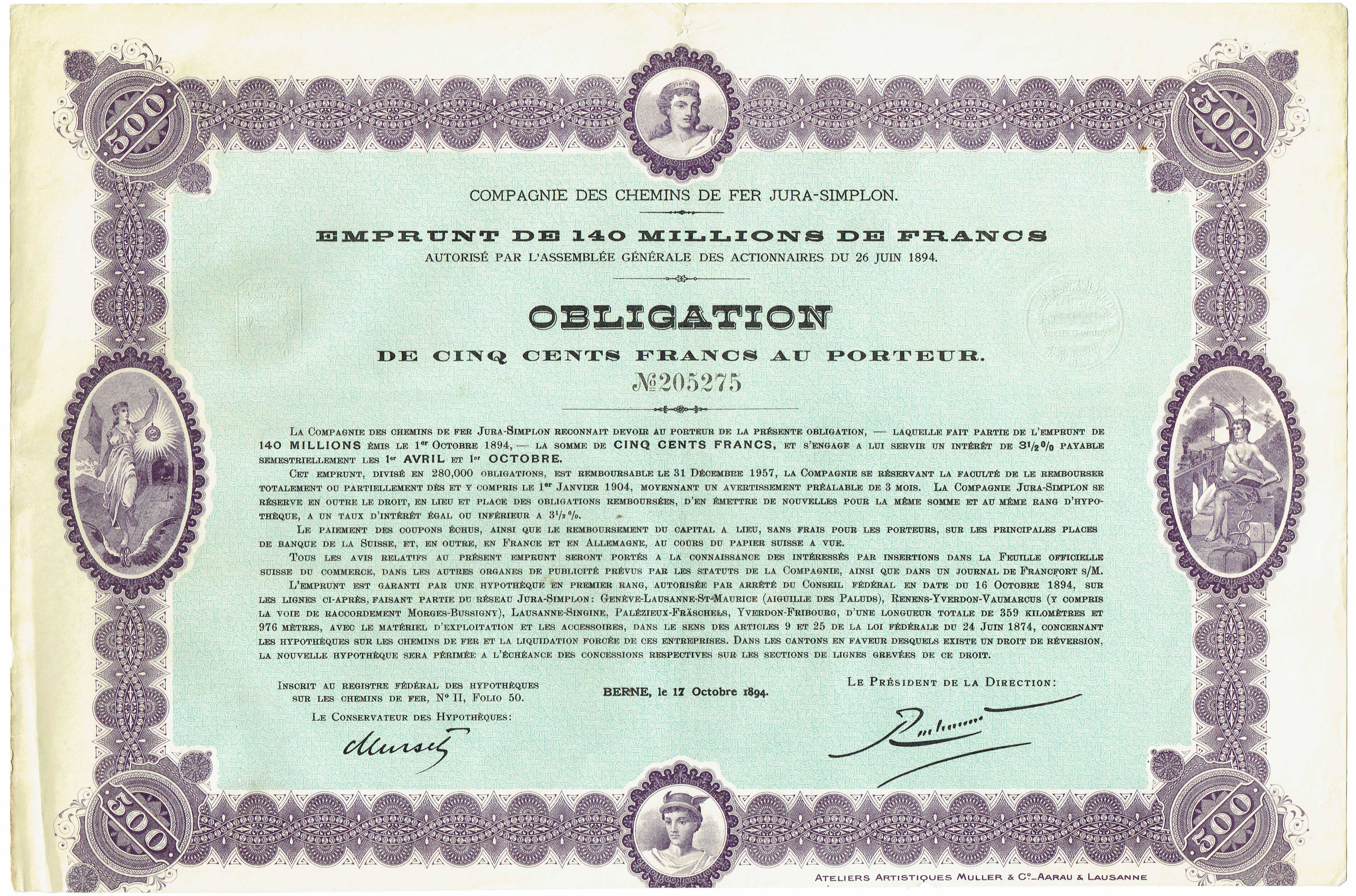
Bond of the Compagnie des Chemins de Fer Jura-Simplon, issued 17 October 1894

The Jura–Simplon Railways was a railway company, which was formed from the 1890 merger of the two most important western Swiss railway companies, the Jura–Bern–Lucerne Railway (JBL), including the Gümligen–Lucerne line belonging to the canton of Bern, and the Western Swiss Railways (Chemins de fer de la Suisse Occidentale; SOS). The Federal Government also participated in the merger by means of a voluntary share purchase. The Pont–Vallorbe Railway (Chemin de fer Pont–Vallorbe), operated by the SOS, was purchased on 1 January 1891.

The share capital of the new company was formed of Swiss francs (CHF) 52 million of preferred stock and CHF 34 million of common stock. The preferred shares comprised 38 million existing JBL shares and 14 million SOS shares. The nominal value of an SOS ordinary share was reduced from CHF 500 to 200 and the amount of CHF 52.4 million exempted from the stock reconstruction was applied to depreciation. The Swiss government was given the right to repurchase the JS.

=== Construction of the Simplon Tunnel ===
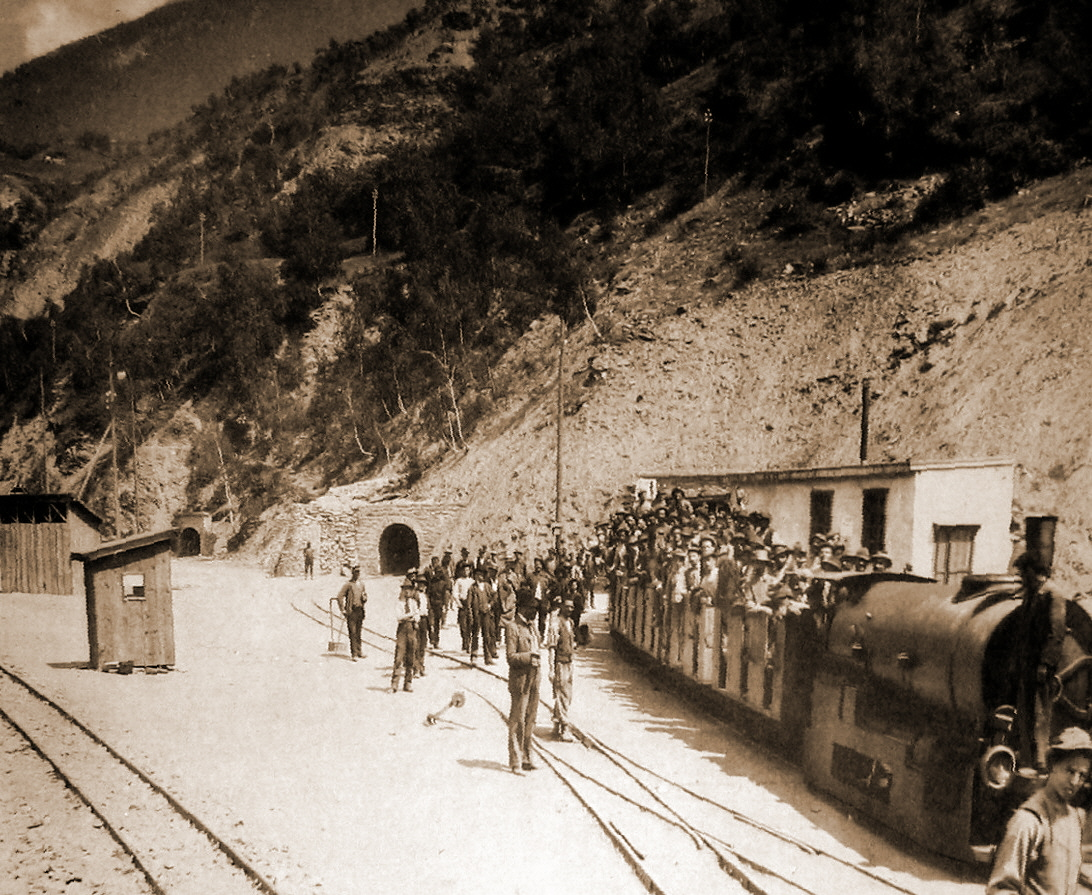
North portal of the Simplon tunnel near Brig during construction

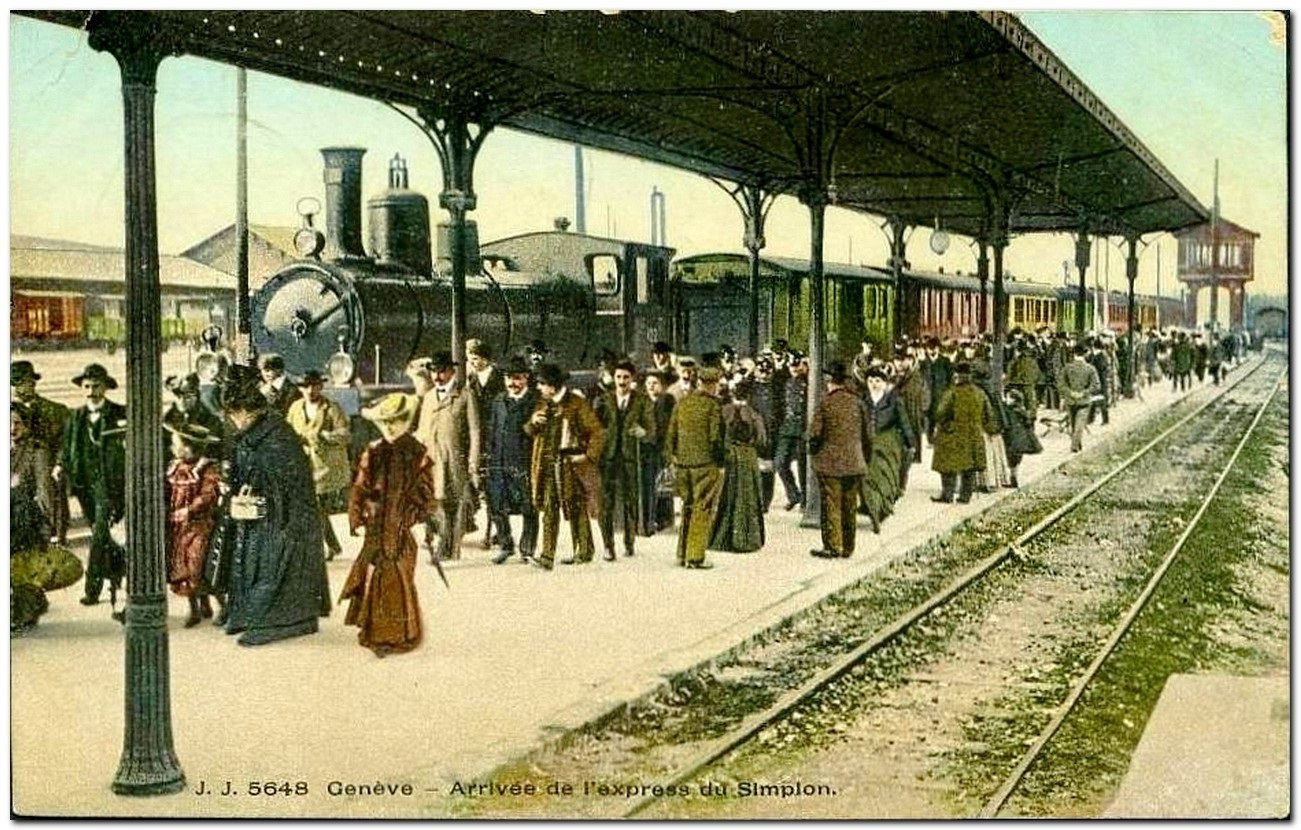
The Simplon Express hauled by locomotive B 3/4 at Geneva-Cornavin station, which was inaugurated after the opening of the tunnel

Although the Jura-Simplon Railway was a railway company for only 13 years, it helped break the impasse over the building of the Simplon Tunnel from Brig to Iselle in Italy after decades of effort by Bern and Romandy. Studies prepared to support the construction of the tunnel had already been submitted by the SOS to the federal and cantonal authorities. In 1891, JS, as a new entrepreneurial railway company, presented the Federal Council with a definitive project for the Simplon Tunnel.

On 25 November 1895, a treaty was signed with Italy for the construction of what would be the longest tunnel in the world. The construction costs for the single-track tunnel were estimated at CHF 58,820,000. The treaty obliged Switzerland to provide funding of CHF 15 million and Italy to provide funding of CHF 4 million. Italy was represented by four directors on the JS board. Construction began on the 19,803-metre-long tunnel in 1898. The tunnel was the longest railway tunnel in the world until the opening of the Seikan Tunnel in 1988.

=== Operations ===
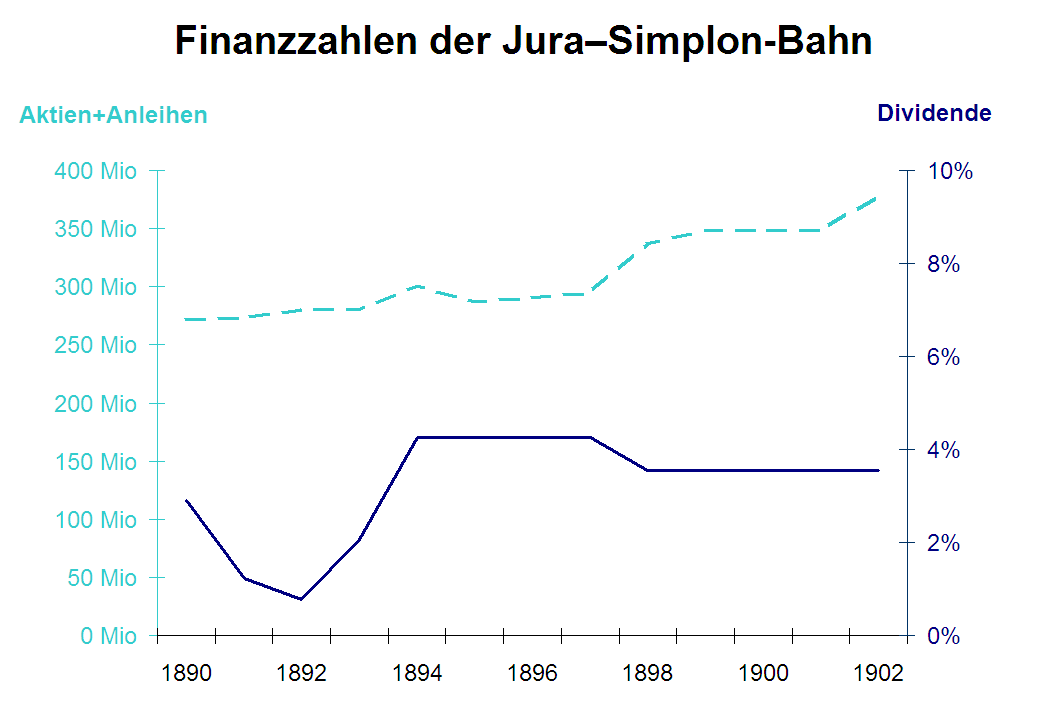
The JS was able to pay a dividend every year.

The Jura–Simplon Railways operated several other railway lines:

- Jougne–Vallorbe–Pontarlier line and Verrières–Pontarlier line of the French Chemins de fer de Paris à Lyon et à la Méditerranée (PLM)
- Bière–Apples–Morges railway (BAM)
- Bödelibahn (BB; from 1895)
- Bulle–Romont railway (BR)
- Cossonay–Gare–Ville funicular (CG)
- Fribourg–Ins railway (Chemin de fer Friborg-Morat-Anet, FMA)
- Neuchâtel–Le Locle-Col-des-Roches railway (Jura neuchâtelois; JN)
- Pont–Brassus Railway (PBr)
- Pont–Vallorbe Railway (PV)
- Travers–Buttes railway (Régional du Val-de-Travers; RVT)
- Spiez-Erlenbach Railway (SEB)
- Lake Thun Railway (Thunerseebahn; TSB)
- Visp-Zermatt Railway (VZ)
- Yverdon–Ste-Croix railway (YSteC)

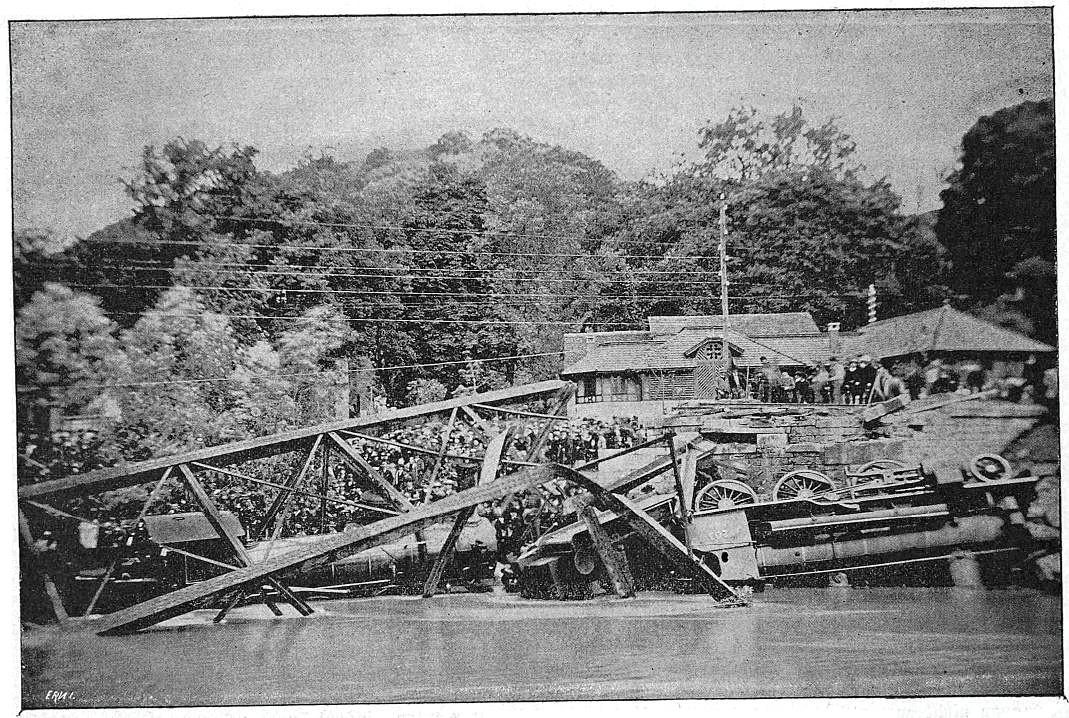
The Münchenstein disaster cost the lives of 73 passengers.

On 14 June 1891, the Jura–Simplon Railways suffered the Münchenstein rail disaster, the worst railway accident in Swiss history. The railway bridge over the Birs, which was built by Gustave Eiffel, collapsed below the village of Münchenstein under a train from Basel. Three carriages and the two locomotives crashed into the flooded Birs. 78 people were killed and 131 were injured. A soldier died of injuries sustained during the cleanup. The accident led to a stricter supervision of the railways. The railway bridges were systematically examined and the first building standards were created.

In the Zollikofen train crash on 17 August 1891 in Zollikofen, a Bern–Paris express ran into an "extra" (not listed in the timetable) train waiting at a red home signal. The impact killed 14 passengers and injured 122 on the extra train. The accident was caused by mistakes at various operating points. The express has been released to run through an occupied section. A deactivated air brake also reduced the braking effect.

Despite investing in the construction of the Simplon tunnel, JS was able to pay a dividend every year.

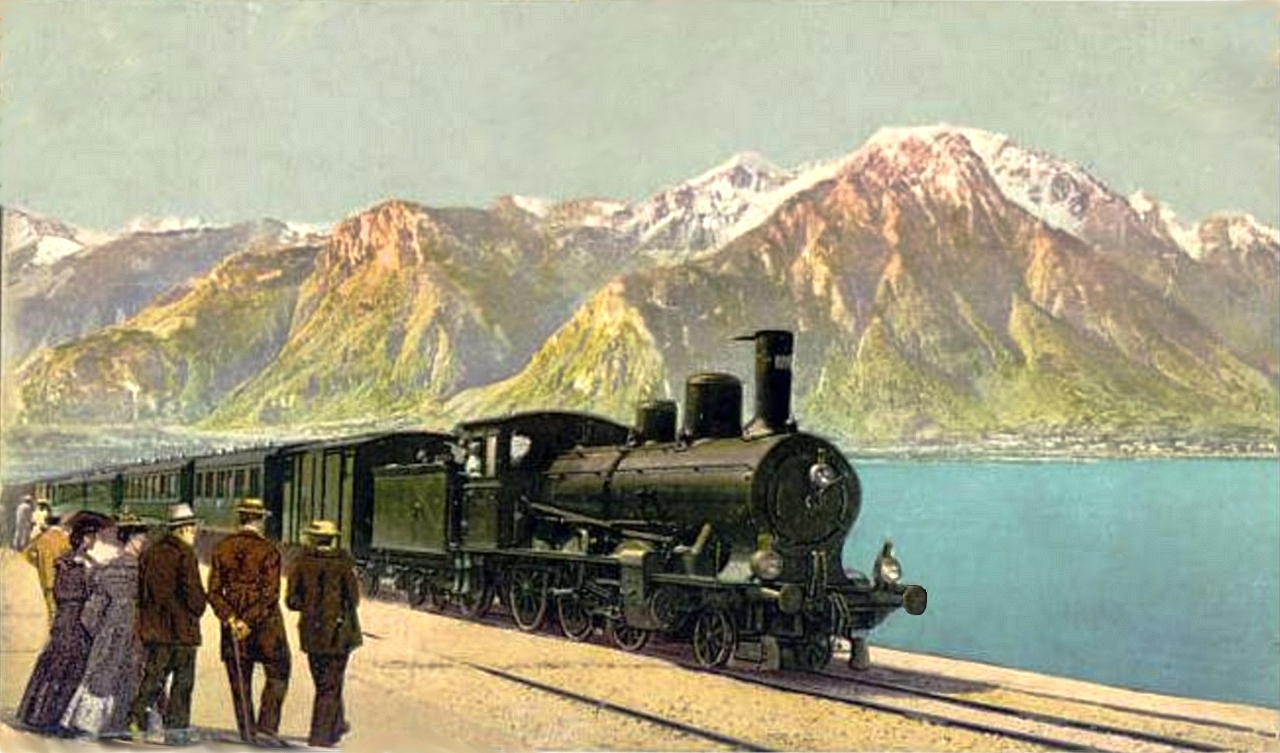
Train hauled by a B 3/4 on the shores of Lake Geneva with the Savoy Alps in the background.

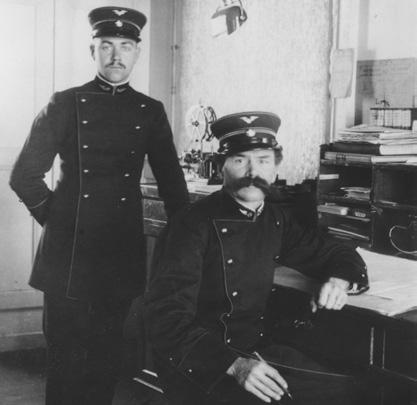
Two officers of the JS in the office of Kaiserstuhl station.

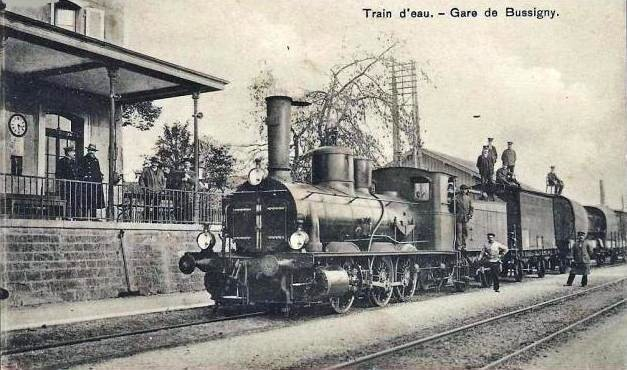
"Water train" in Bussigny station

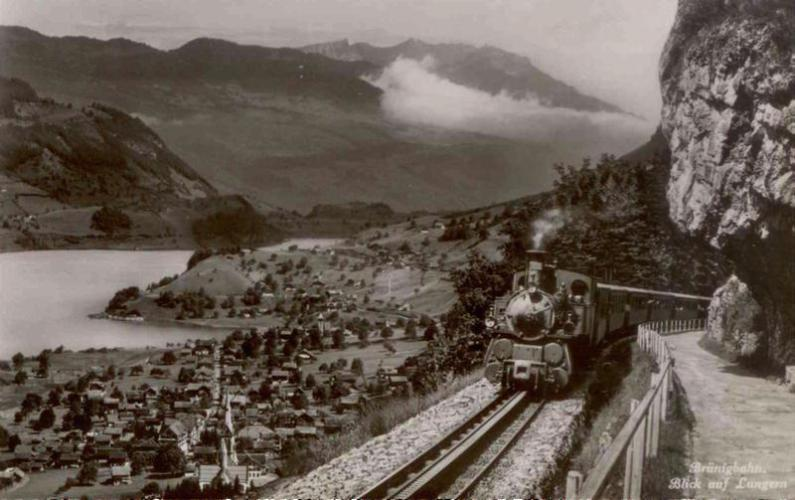
Train of Brünig Railway on the rack section above Lungern.

==== Posters ====
Thee Jura-Simplon Railway advertised with a series of posters. Some of them were designed by Hugo d’Alési.

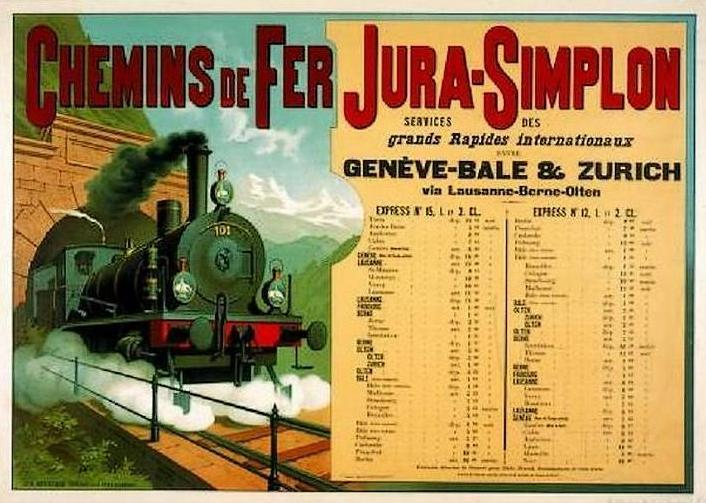

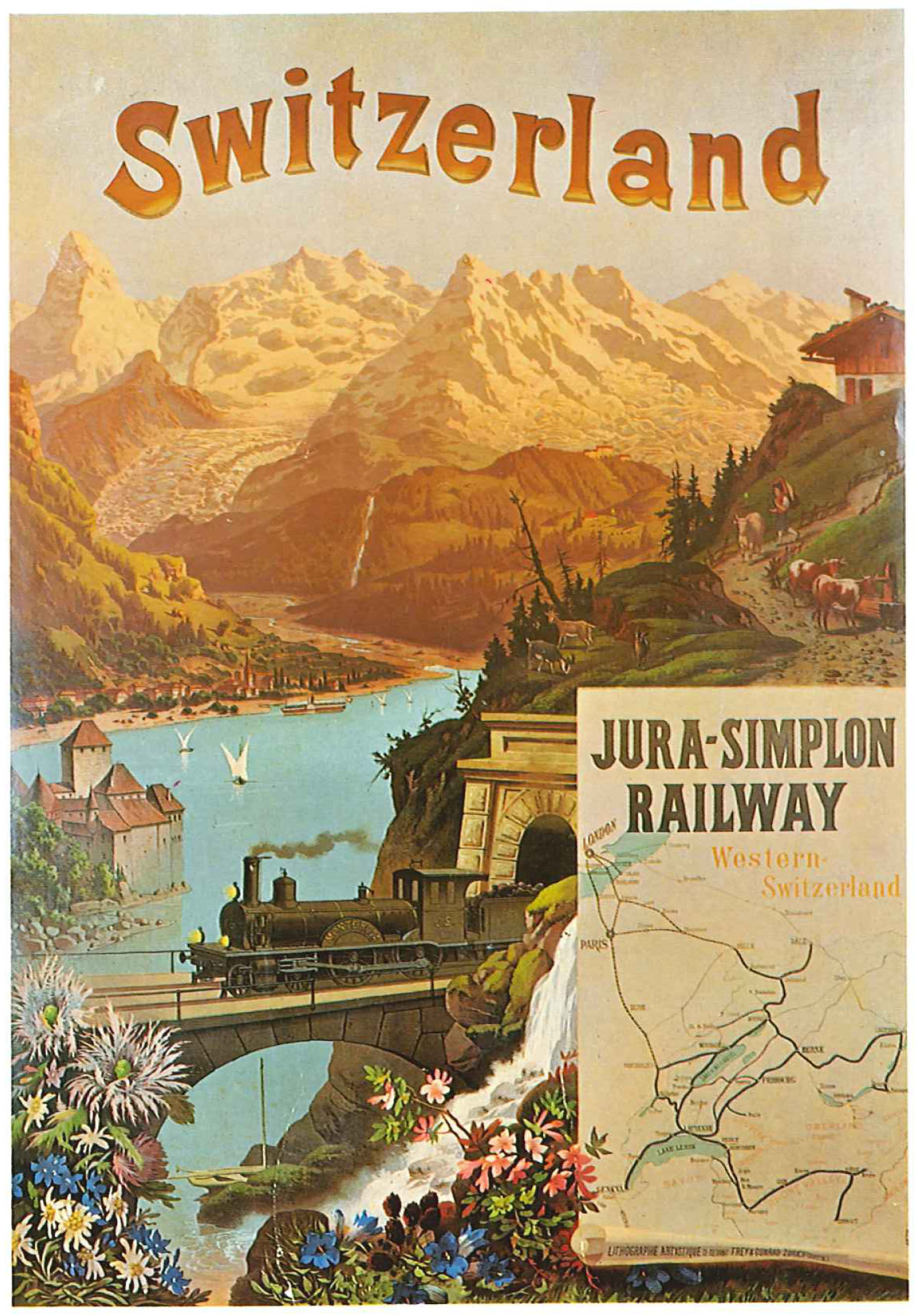

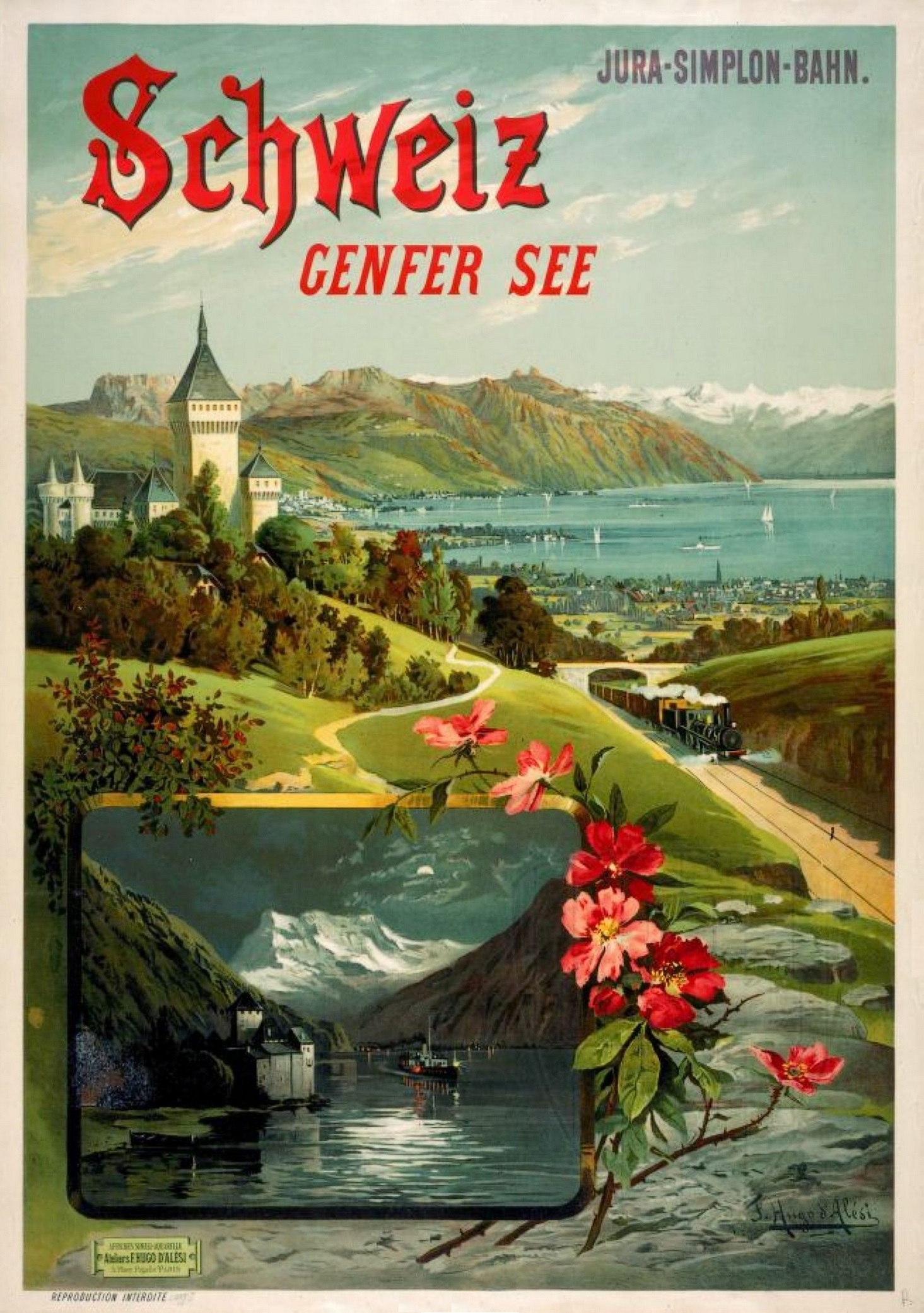

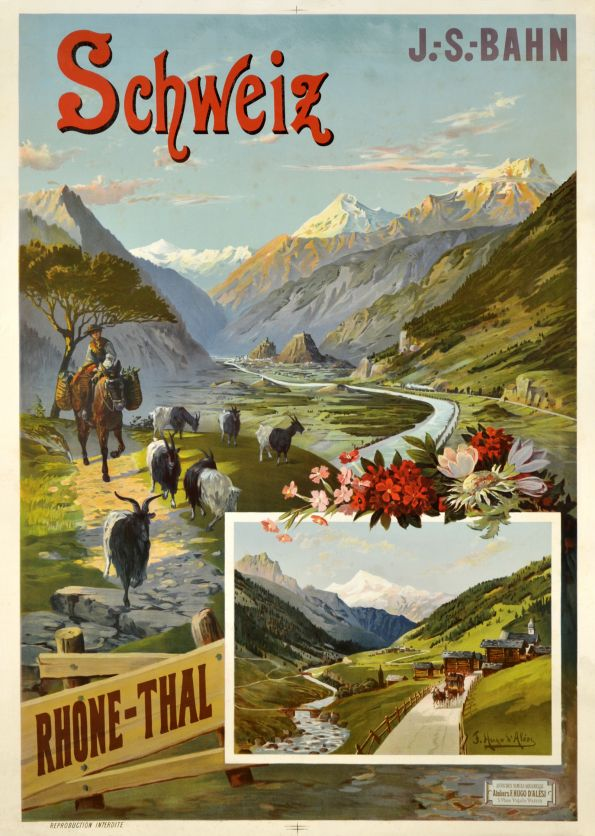

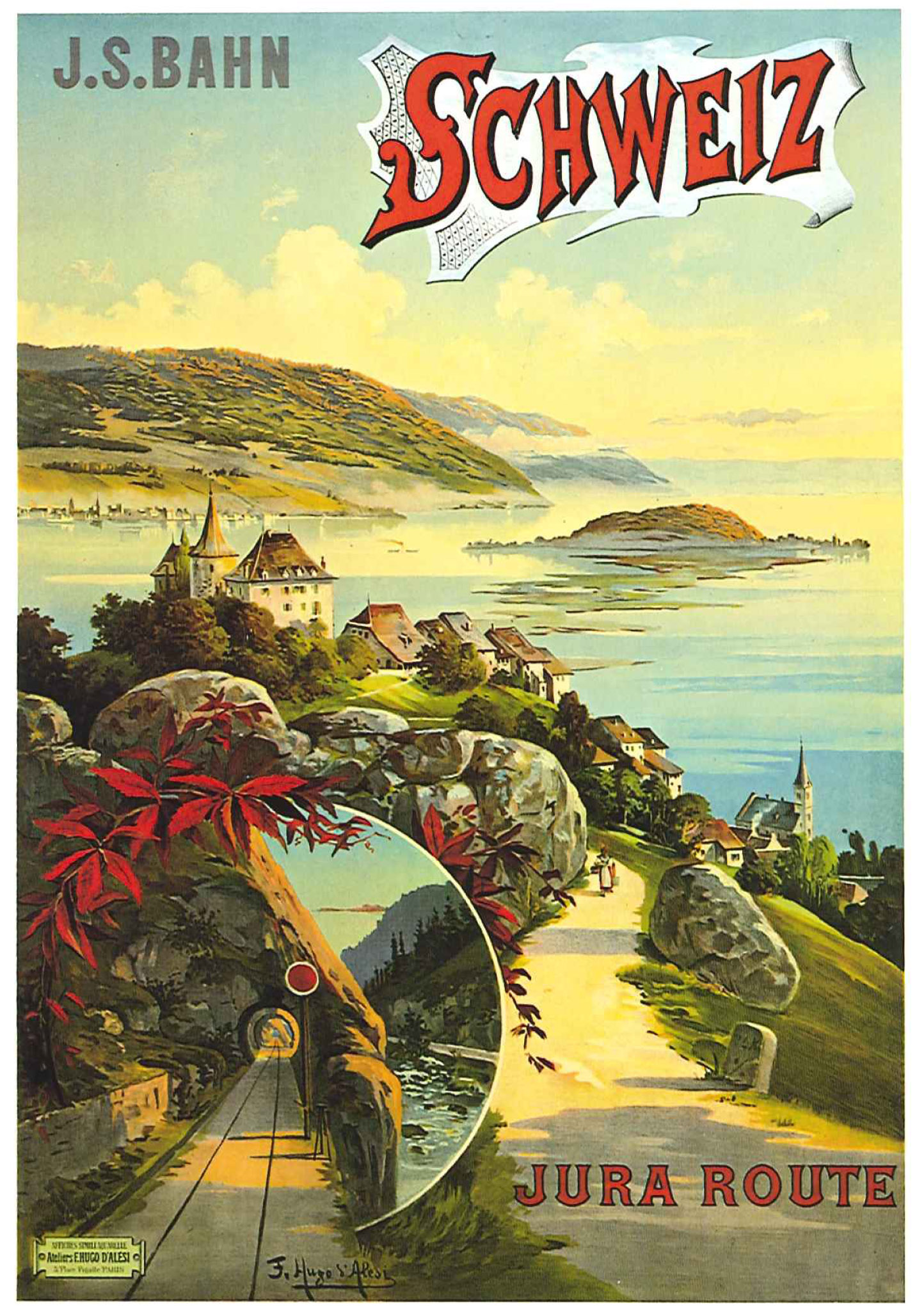

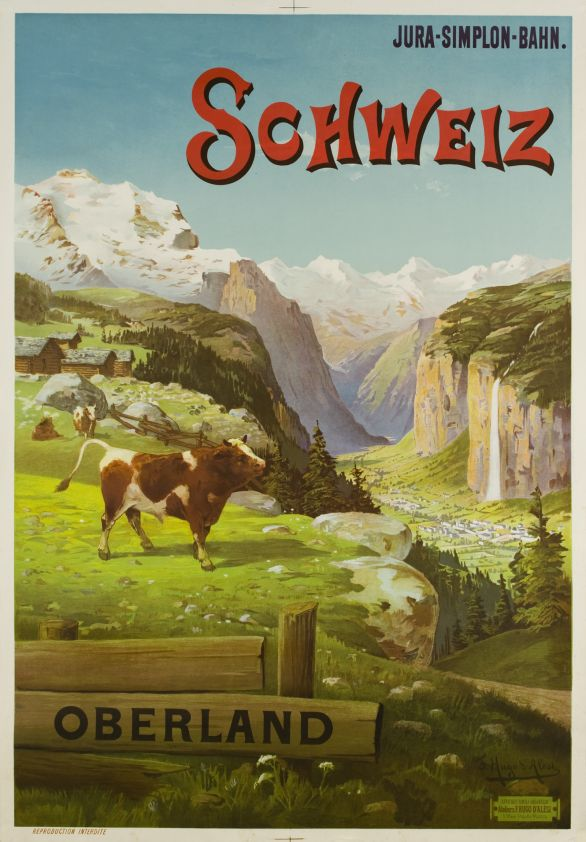

=== Nationalisation ===
During the construction of the Simplon tunnel, the national referendum of 20 February 1898 agreed to the nationalisation the Jura-Simplon railway and the other four main railways. The Jura-Simplon Railway was taken over by the Swiss Federal Railways (SBB) on 1 May 1903 and it completed the Simplon Tunnel in 1906.

=== Graphic summary ===
Overview of the history of the Jura–Simplon Railways (T: takeover):

→ Predecessor railways of the SOS	→ Predecessor railways of the JB
Western Switzerland- Simplon (SOS); T: 1.1.1890	Jura-Bern-Lucerne (JBL) inc. Gümligen–Lucerne; T: 1.1.1890	Pont–Vallorbe (PV); T: 1.1.1891
Swiss Central; Railway (SCB) (Note: Including the Aargau Southern Railway, the Bötzberg Railway, and the Wohlen-Bremgarten-Bahn, which were owned jointly by the Central Railway and the Northeastern Railway.); T: 1.1.1902	Swiss Northeastern; Railway (NOB); T: 1.1.1902	United Swiss; Railways (VSB); T: 1.7.1902	Jura–Simplon Railways (JS); T: 1.5.1903	Gotthard Railway (GB); T: 1.5.1909
Swiss Federal; Railways (SBB)

== Infrastructure and vehicles ==
=== Stations ===
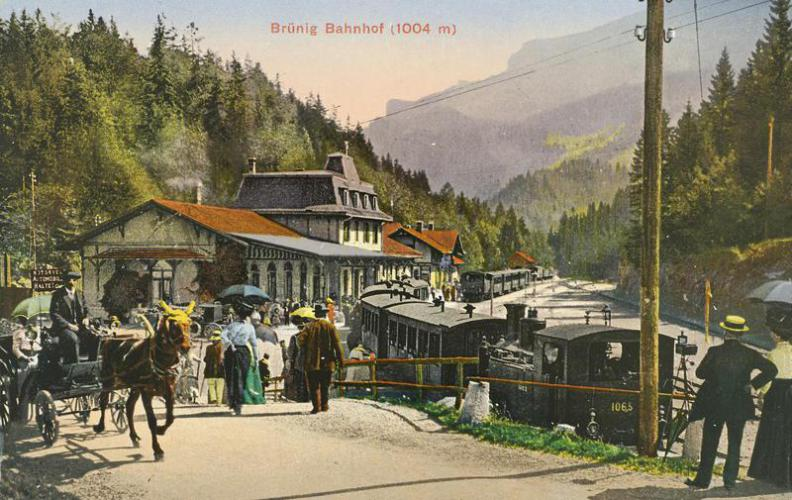
Brünig station around 1900

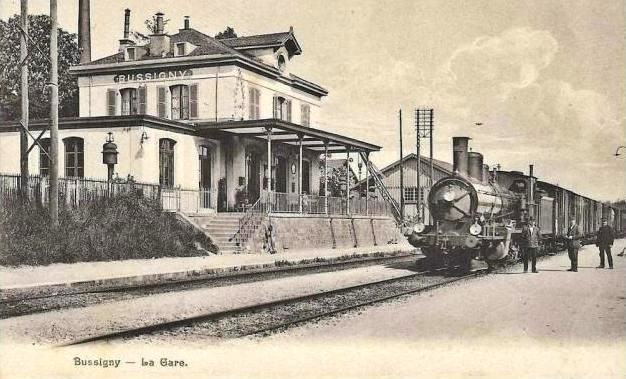
Bussigny station around 1905, with B 3/4 of the former JS

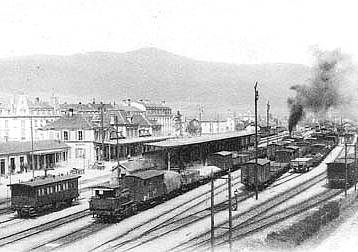
Delémont station around 1897

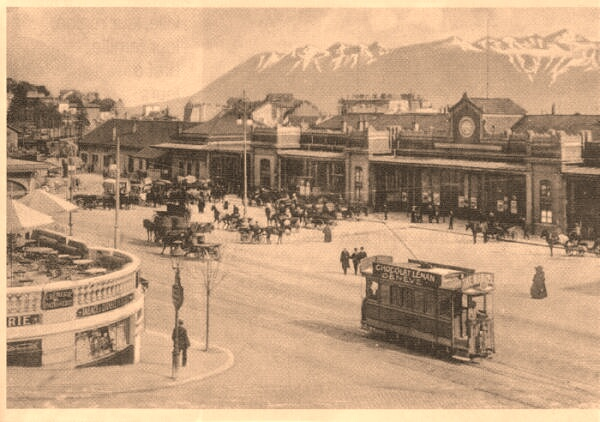
Lausanne station around 1898

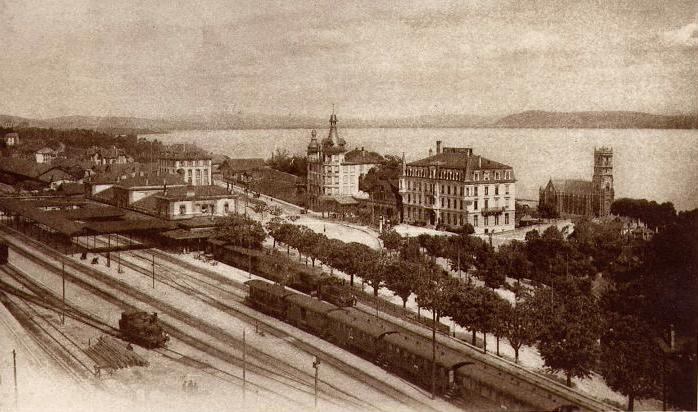
Neuchâtel station around 1897

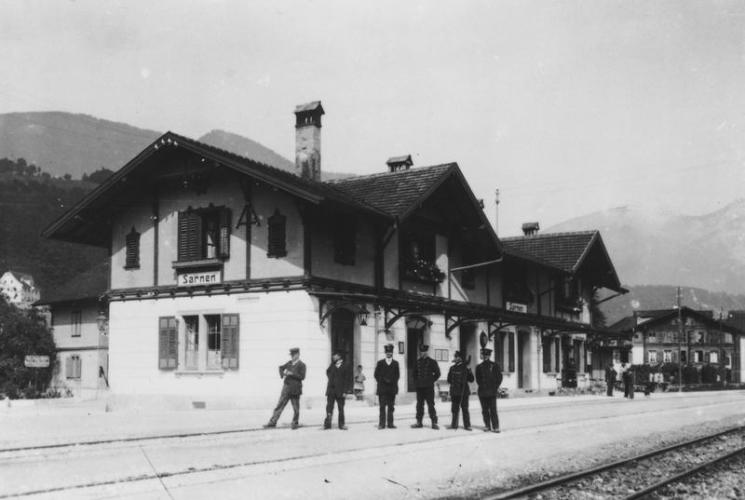
Sarnen station of the Brünig Railway around 1910

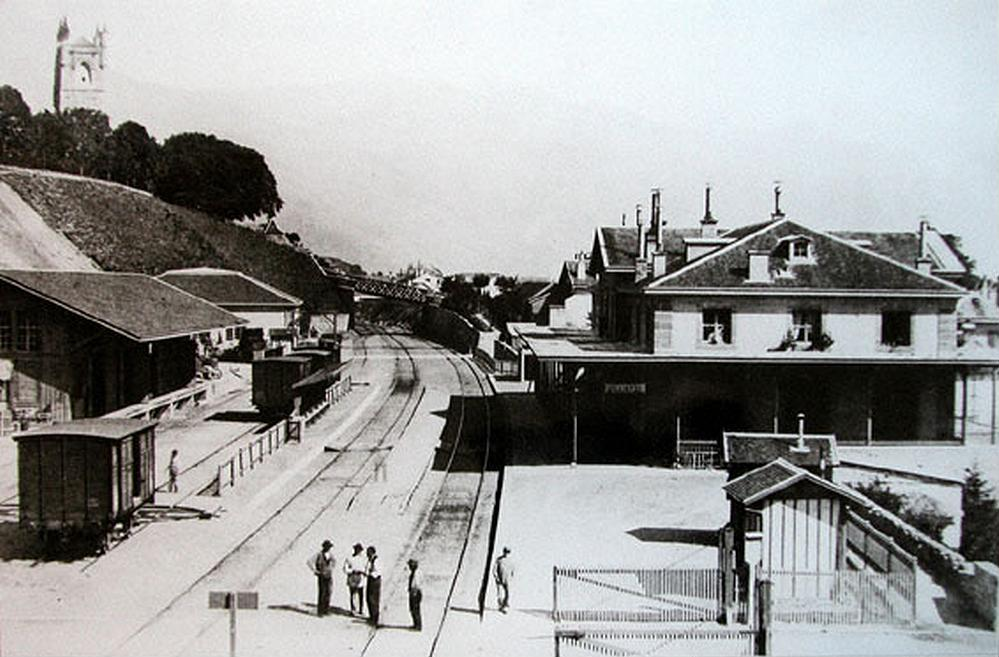
Vevey station before its extension shortly after 1900

The stations of Basel, Bern and Lucerne of the Central Railway (SCB) and Geneva of the Paris-Lyon-Mediterranean (PLM) were shared by the Jura-Simplon Railway.

=== Network ===
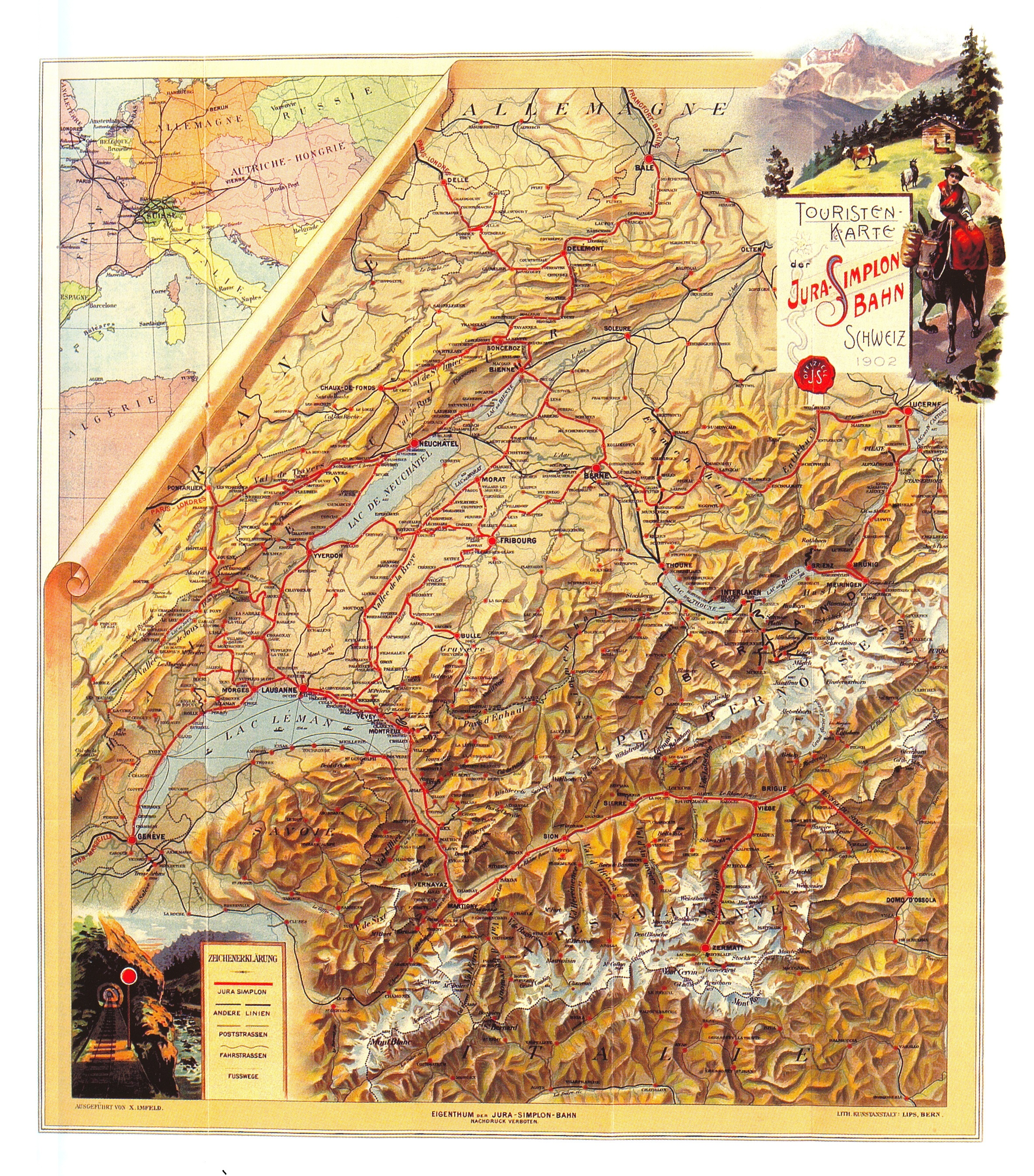
Network of the Jura-Simplon Railway

The route network of 937 km ran from Basel, Geneva and the Jura border crossings of Delle, La Chaux-de-Fonds, Les Verrières and Vallorbe to Brig and Lucerne. In addition, the narrow-gauge Brünig Railway from Lucerne to Brienz was part of the 937 km-long route network. It consisted of the combined lines of its predecessor railways:

- the lines of the Jura-Bern-Lucerne
- the lines of the Western Swiss Railways
- the Pont–Vallorbe Railway

==== Duplication ====
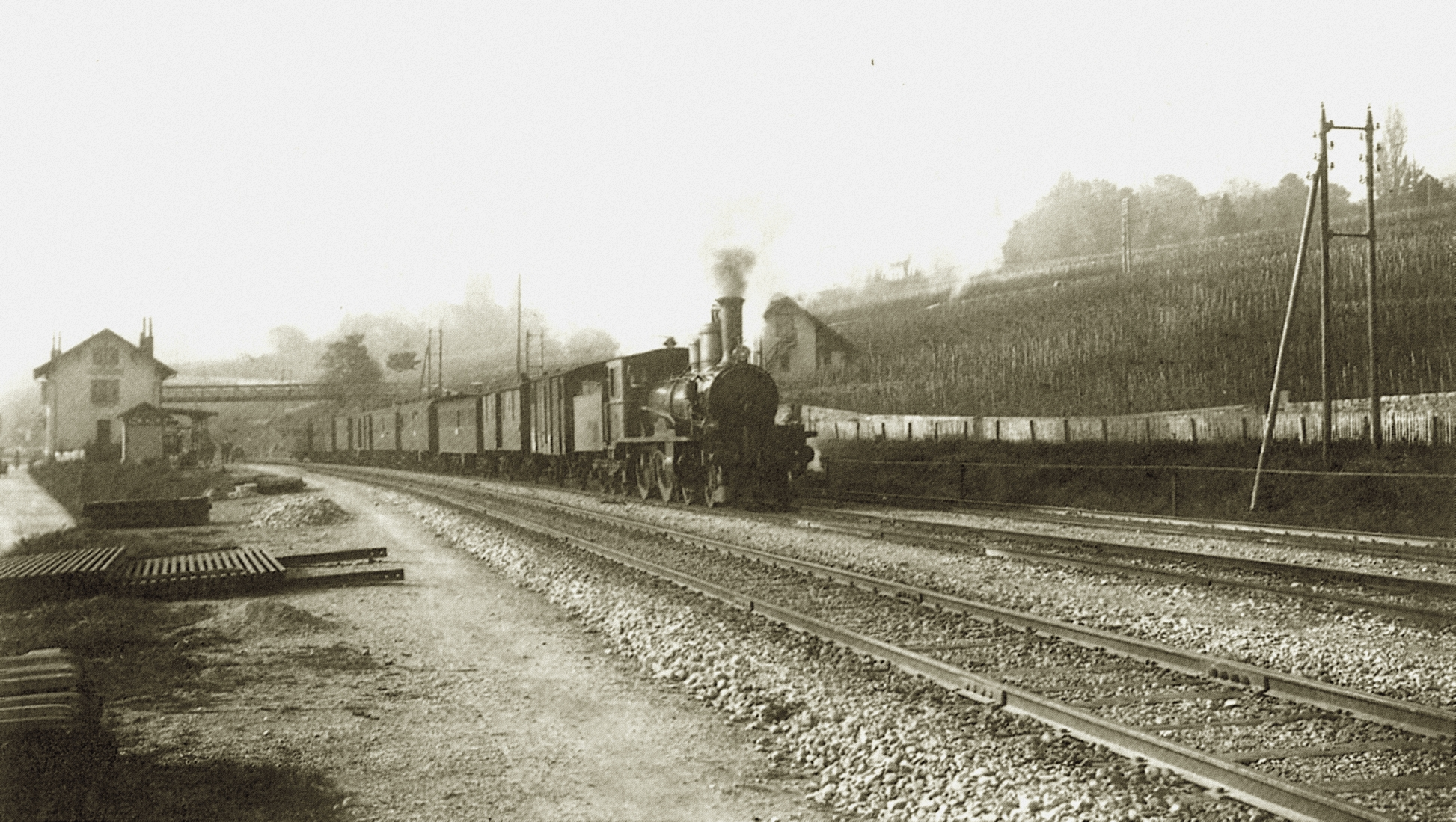
An express train hauled by a two-cylinder compound locomotive of class A 2/4 on the double track at Auvernier.

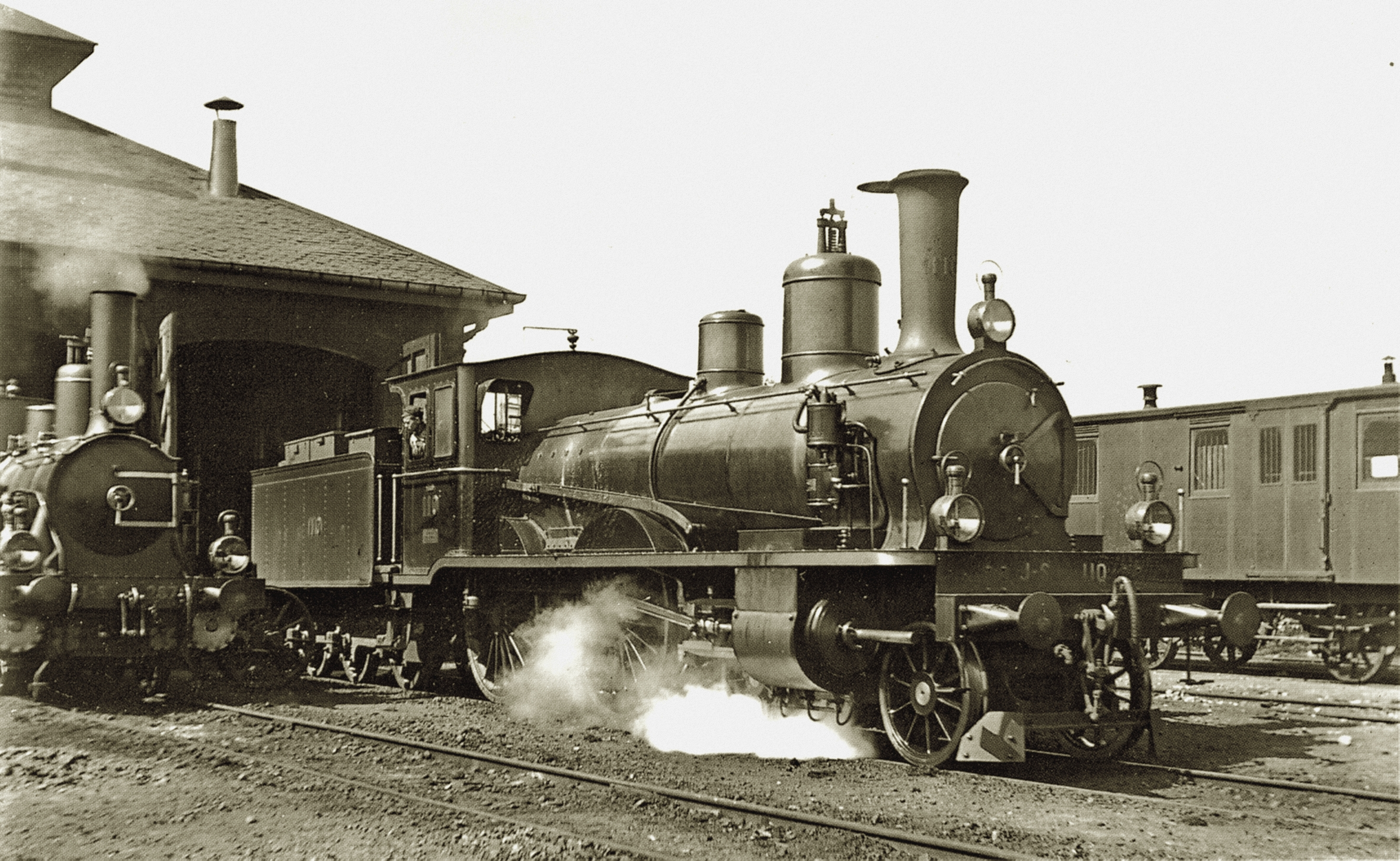
A 2/4 No. 110 in front of the Lausanne depot.

The Jura-Simplon Railway continued the track duplication of its predecessors. When SBB took over JS in 1903, 131.20 km (14%) of the network was duplicated.

Railway line	Section	Double track opened on
Lausanne–Biel	Lausanne–Renens VD	5 May 1856 by Western Swiss
Lausanne–Biel	Renens VD–Bussigny	1897
Lausanne–Biel	Bussigny–Cossonay	21 August 1895
Lausanne–Biel	Cossonay–Daillens	1 June 1896
Lausanne–Biel	Auvernier–Neuchâtel	1 June 1898 (Note: Neuchâtel-Vauseyon–Neuchâtel previously parallel tracks of the two lines to Lausanne and La Chaux-de-Fonds)
Lausanne–Geneva		1868–1879 by Western Swiss, Western Swiss-Simplon and LFB
Lausanne–Bern	Lausanne–La Conversion	1 May 1902
Lausanne–Bern	Chexbres–Palézieux	1 May 1902
Lausanne–Brig	Lausanne–Lutry	1 June 1900
Lausanne–Brig	Lutry–Cully	1 June 1899
Lausanne–Brig	Cully–Rivaz	1 October 1892
Lausanne–Brig	Rivaz–Montreux	1 June 1892
Lausanne–Brig	Montreux–Villeneuve	10 October 1891
Lausanne–Brig	Granges-Lens–Sierre	24 June 1901
Bern–Biel	Lyss–Busswil (Note: Shared section of the Bern–Lyss–Biel line of the JS and Lyss–Solothurn line of the Central Railway)	1877 by Bern-Lucerne-Bahn

=== Rolling stock ===
The Jura-Simplon Railway named their rolling stock according to the then nationwide classification system.

The JS operated the following locomotives. The class name that was valid from 1902 is listed in brackets.

Class	JS no.	SBB No. (Note: The SBB renumbered the locomotives taken over after the completion of boiler revisions.) from 1903	Manufacturer	Build year	Scrapped	image
A2 (Ec 2/4)	1–12	–	Taken over in 1890 from the Bern-Lucerne Railway (BLB; see there)		1888–1896	
A2 (Eb 2/4)	13–16	5441–5442	Taken over in 1890 from the Bernese Jura Railway (JBL; see there)		1900–1917	
A2 (Eb 2/4)	17–32	5451–5476	Taken over in 1890 from the Bernese Jura Railway (JBL; see there)		1900–1947	Eb 2/4
A2 (Eb 2/4)	33–42	5451–5476	Esslingen, SLM Winterthur	1880–1892	1900–1947	Eb 2/4
A2T (B 2/3)	51–63	–	Taken over in 1890 from the Western Switzerland–Simplon Company (SOS; see there)		1890–1902	
A2T (B 2/3)	63–67	–	Taken over in 1890 from the Western Switzerland–Simplon Company (SOS; see there)		1892–1896	
A2T (B 2/3)	69–73	–	Taken over in 1890 from the Western Switzerland–Simplon Company (SOS; see there)		1890–1892	
A2T (B 2/3)	74–79	1074–1079	Taken over in 1890 from the Western Switzerland–Simplon Company (SOS; see there)		1904–1907	
A2T (B 2/3)	80–82	1080–1082	Taken over in 1890 from the Western Switzerland–Simplon Company (SOS; see there)		1903	
A2T (A 2/4)	101–130	101–130	SLM Winterthur	1892–1896	1917–1926	A 2/4
A3T (B 3/4)	201–204	1421–1424	Taken over in 1890 from the SOS (see there)		1917	
A3T (B 3/4)	205–212	1561–1568	Taken over in 1890 from the JBL (see there)		1924–1932	
A3T (B 3/4)	213–222	1569–1578	SLM Winterthur	1891	1912–1932	
A 3/5	231–232	701–702	SLM Winterthur	1902	1926–1964	A 3/5
A 3/5	(Nachbau SBB)	703–811	SLM Winterthur	1904–1909	1926–1964	A 3/5
B2 (Ec 2/4)	251–262	6195–6199	Taken over in 1890 from the Lausanne–Fribourg–Bern Railway (see there)		1895–1905	
B2 (Ec 2/3)	263–267	6398, 6399	Taken over in 1890 from the SOS (see there)		1909–1923	
A3T (B 3/4)	301–375 (Note: Locomotive No. 301 initially bore the company number 231.)	1601–1675	SLM Winterthur	1896–1902	1923–1945	B 3/4
A3T (B 3/4)	(Nachbau SBB)	1676–1747	SLM Winterthur	1903–1907	1923–1945	B 3/4
B3T (C 3/3)	401–416	2401–2403, 2406–2412, 2413	Taken over in 1890 from the SOS (see there)		1900–1911	
B3T (C 3/3)	417–419	2404, 2413	Taken over in 1890 from the SOS (see there)		1898–1909	
B3T (C 3/3)	421–424	–	Taken over in 1890 from the BLB (see there)		1898–1902	
B3T (C 3/3)	425–431	2405, 2415–2416	Taken over in 1890 from the JBL (see there)		1900–1911	
C3 (Ed 3/3)	451–457	7291–7297	Taken over in 1890 from the BLB (see there)		1906–1916	
C3T (D 3/3)	501–505	3351, 3368–3369, 3699	Taken over in 1890 from the SOS (see there)		1901–1913	
C3T (D 3/3)	506–508	3364, 3370–3371	Taken over in 1890 from the SOS (see there)		1907–1913	
C3T (D 3/3)	509–511	3372–3374	Taken over in 1890 from the SOS (see there)		1909–1914	
C3T (D 3/3)	512–519	3352–3353, 3375–3378, 3390	Taken over in 1890 from the SOS (see there)		1897–1925	
C3T (D 3/3)	520–539	3354–3359, 3363–3367, 3379–3386, 3389, 3391	Taken over in 1890 from the SOS (see there)		1901–1925	
C3T (D 3/3)	540	3387	JS (Yverdon workshop)	1892	1924	
C3T (D 3/3)	541–546	3360–3361, 3392–3393, 3399	Taken over in 1890 from the JBL (see there)		1904–1913	
C3T (D 3/3)	547–555	3362–3363, 3388, 3394–3398	Taken over in 1890 from the JBL (see there)		1902–1917	
C3T (D 3/3)	561–565	3421–3425	SLM Winterthur	1890	1916	
B3 (Ec 3/4) (Note: Locomotives 6513, 6515 and 6517–6529 were rebuilt from 1922 to 1928 in the SBB main workshops of Rorschach and Biel as Ec 3/5 6601–6615.)	601–612	6501–6512	SLM Winterthur	1901	1934–1955	Ec 3/4
B3 (Ec 3/4)	(Nachbau SBB)	6513–6529	SLM Winterthur	1904–1910	1933–1961	Ec 3/4
E3 (E 3/3)	751–752	–	Taken over in 1891 from the Pont–Vallorbe Railway (see there)		1924–1948	
F2 (E 2/3)	801	–	Taken over in 1890 from the SOS (see there)		1891	
F3 (E 3/3)	851–852	8571–8572	Taken over in 1890 from the JBL (see there)		1911–1913	
F3 (E 3/3)	853–856	8574–8576	SLM Winterthur	1890	1911–1916	
F3 (E 3/3)	857–866	8431–8440	SLM Winterthur	1901	1947	
Locomotives of the narrow gauge Brünig Railway:
G2 (G 3/3)	901–906	101–110	Taken over in 1890 from the JBL (see there)		1911–1916	G 3/3
G2 (G 3/3)	907–910	101–110	SLM Winterthur	1887–1901	1915–1942	G 3/3
HG2 (HG 2/2)	951–958	1001–1008	Taken over in 1890 from the JBL (see there)		1908–1911	
HG2 (HG 2/2)	959–963	1009–1013	SLM Winterthur	1894–1901	1911–1912	
