= Pont–Vallorbe Railway =

Railway company in Switzerland

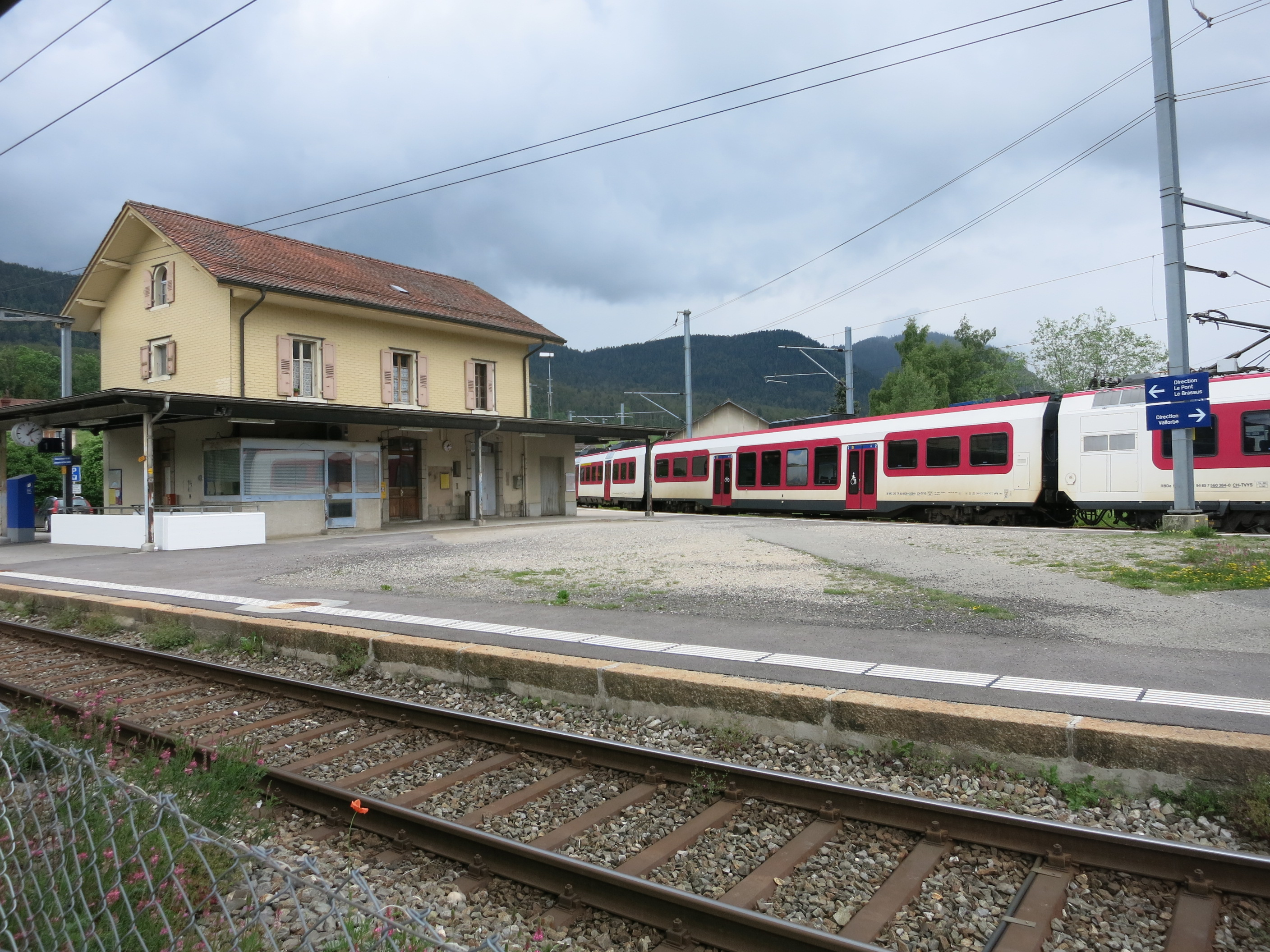
- Le Day station with Travys train

Overview
- Dates of operation: 1886–1891
- Successor: Jura–Simplon Railways

Technical
- Track gauge: 1,435 mm (4 ft 8 1/2 in) standard gauge
- Length: 11.6 km (7.2 mi)
Route map
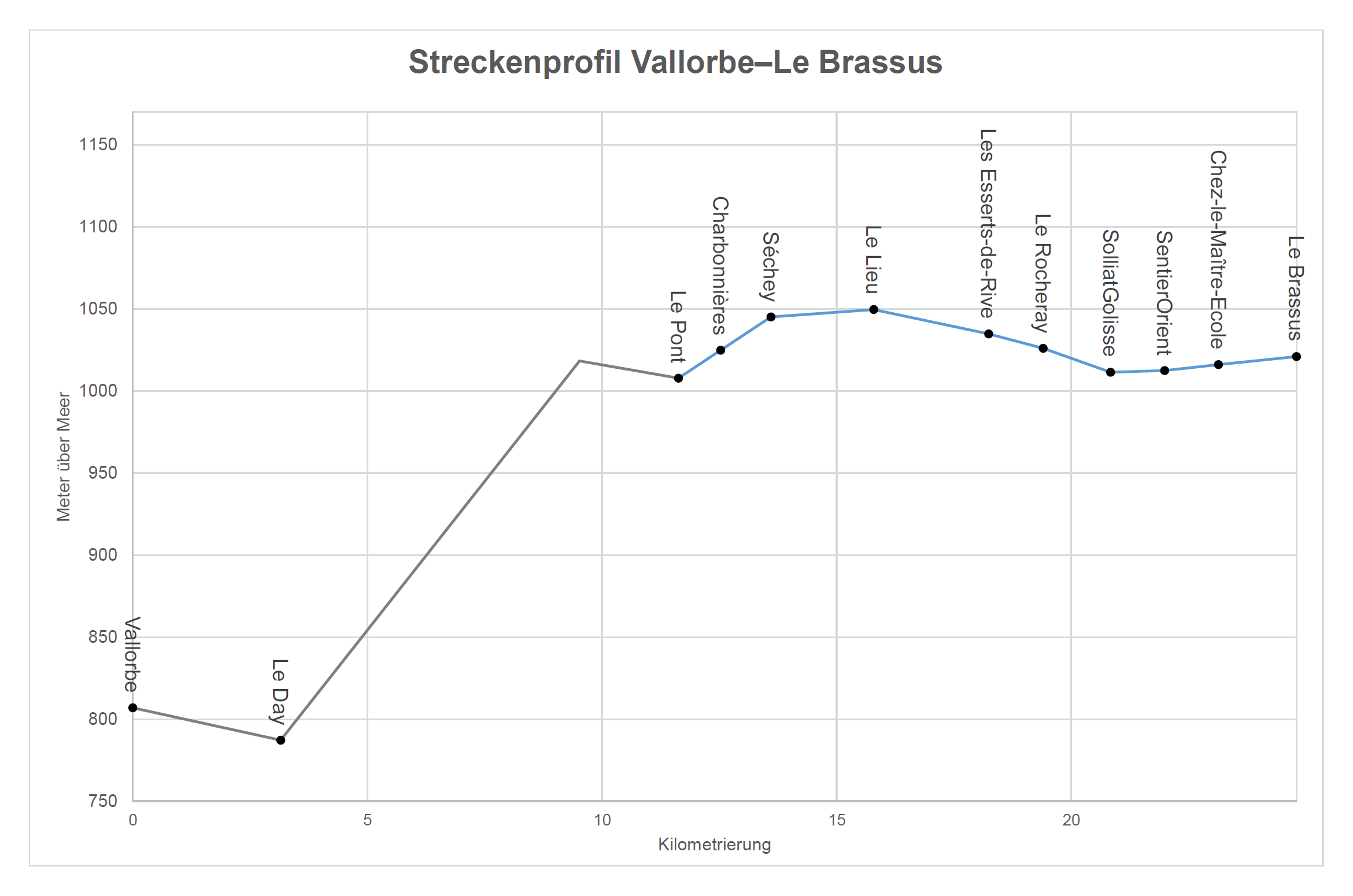
Vallorbe–Le Day–Le Pont–Le Brassus line profile grey: SBB section blue: Travys section
- Source: Swiss railway atlas

The Pont–Vallorbe Railway (French: Chemin de fer Pont–Vallorbe; PV) was a Swiss railway company that existed from 1886 to 1891. Its short railway line is now owned by the Swiss Federal Railways (SBB). The SBB operates the line from Vallorbe through to Le Brassus. The extension from Le Pont to Le Brassus used to belong to the Pont–Brassus Railway (French: Chemin de fer Pont–Brassus; PBr), but since 2001 it has been owned by Travys.

== History ==
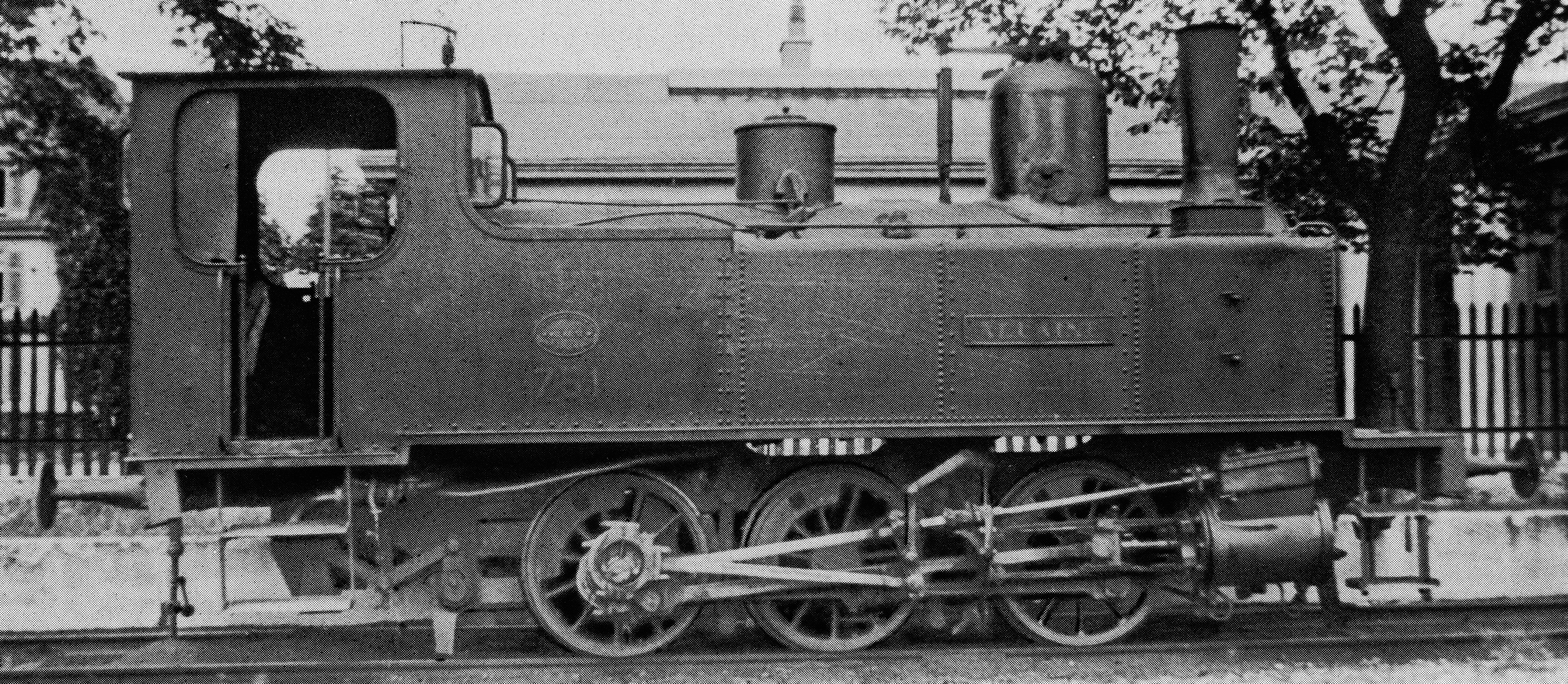
Locomotive No. 201 on the tracks of its later owner Régional Porrentruy–Bonfol (RPB)

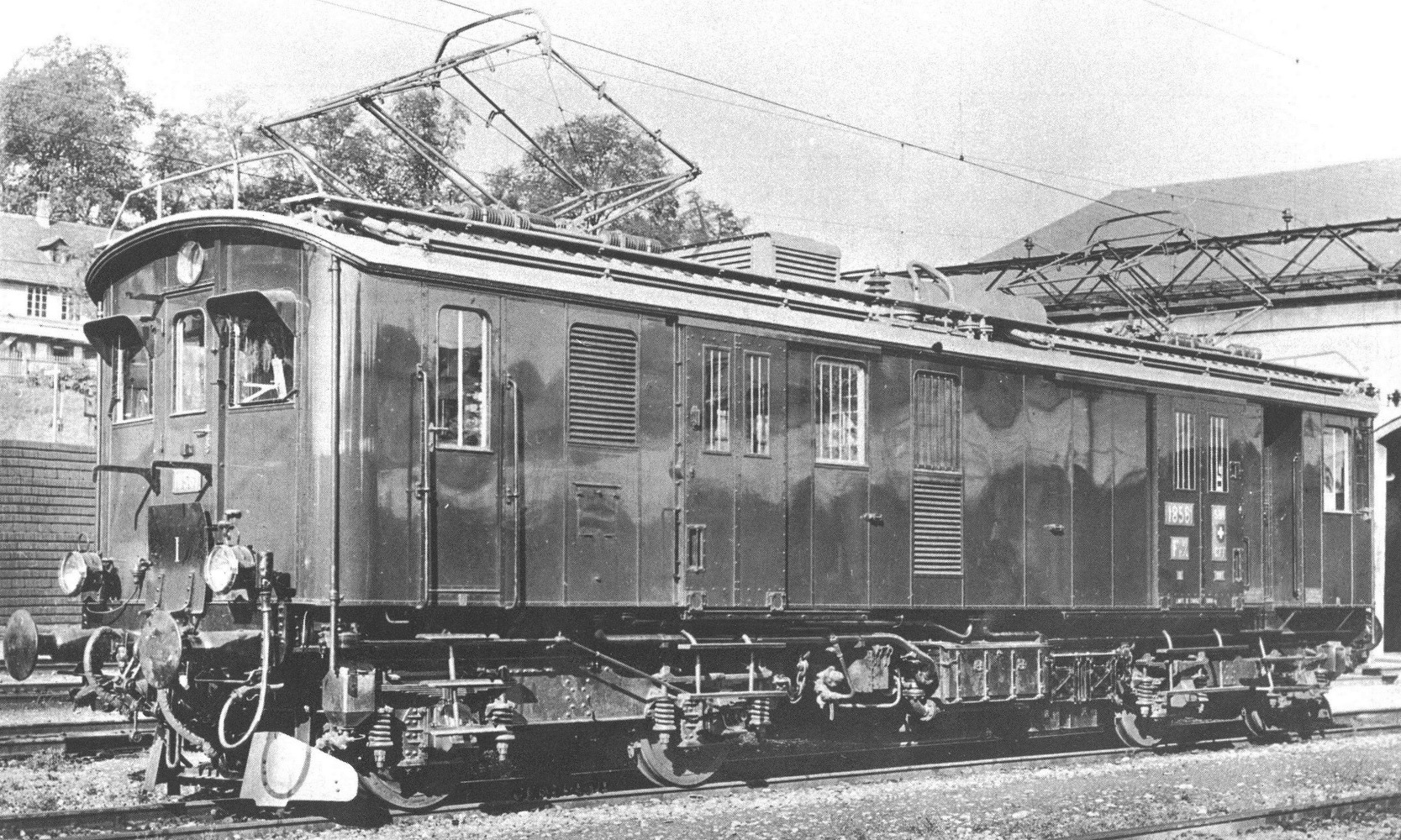
After the electrification in the Vallée de Joux, the SBB used Fe 4/4 18509 to 18511 railcars, which were equipped with regenerative brakes because of the large descent between Le Pont and Le Day.

The Pont–Vallorbe Railway opened the railway line from Le Day to Le Pont in the Vallée de Joux on 31 October 1886. The nearly 8.5 kilometre-long branch line branches at the 3.2 kilometre point of the Vallorbe–Lausanne line in Le Day. The line was operated by the Western Switzerland–Simplon Railway (Suisse-Occidentale–Simplon; SOS) and from 1891 by the Jura–Simplon Railway (Jura-Simplon-Bahn; JS), which was created by the merger of SOS with the Jura–Bern–Luzern. The rolling stock was provided by the PV.

Freight did not develop as expected. The mining of iron—for which the railway had been built among other things—stagnated and the income from the transport of timber and ice on the short line did not make profitable operations possible. In addition, the profits from the 2.7 kilometre-long Le Day–Vallorbe section went to the SOS and the JS. Although the Pont–Brassus Railway opened a 13.3 kilometre-long extension of the branch line to Le Brassus on 21 August 1899, operating expenses increased significantly more than revenues from 1890. The JS bought the railway company on 1 January 1891 in the form of 5600 ordinary shares at Swiss francs 200 each, ie for 1.2 million francs. The railway's debts of 545,000 francs to the canton of Vaud and the municipalities were written off.

When the Jura–Simplon Railway was nationalised on 1 May 1903, the line became part of the SBB. Freight traffic increased significantly during the two world wars. The lack of fuel led to an intensification of forestry including charcoal burning in the wooded Vallée de Joux. People visited the villages along the Lac de Joux for summer holidays and in winter for ice skating or tobogganing. The economic crisis in the 1930s led to a sharp decline in freight and passenger traffic. On 2 October 1936, the line along with the Pont–Brassus Railway were electrified, so operations could be simplified.

== Rolling stock ==
The following is a list of locomotives used by the PV:

| Class | PV/SOS no. | PV name | Manufacturer | Build year | JS no. from 1891 | RPB no. from 1901 | RPB name from 1901 | Comment | Scrapped |
|---|---|---|---|---|---|---|---|---|---|
| from 1887: E3 from 1902: E 3/3 | 201 | Le Risoux | SACM | 1886 | 751 | 751 | Allaine | Basel Dreispitz from 1929 | 1948 |
| from 1887: E3 from 1902: E 3/3 | 202 | Le Sentier | SACM | 1886 | 752 | 752 | Vendline | | 1924 |
