= Pont–Brassus Railway =

Former railway company in Switzerland

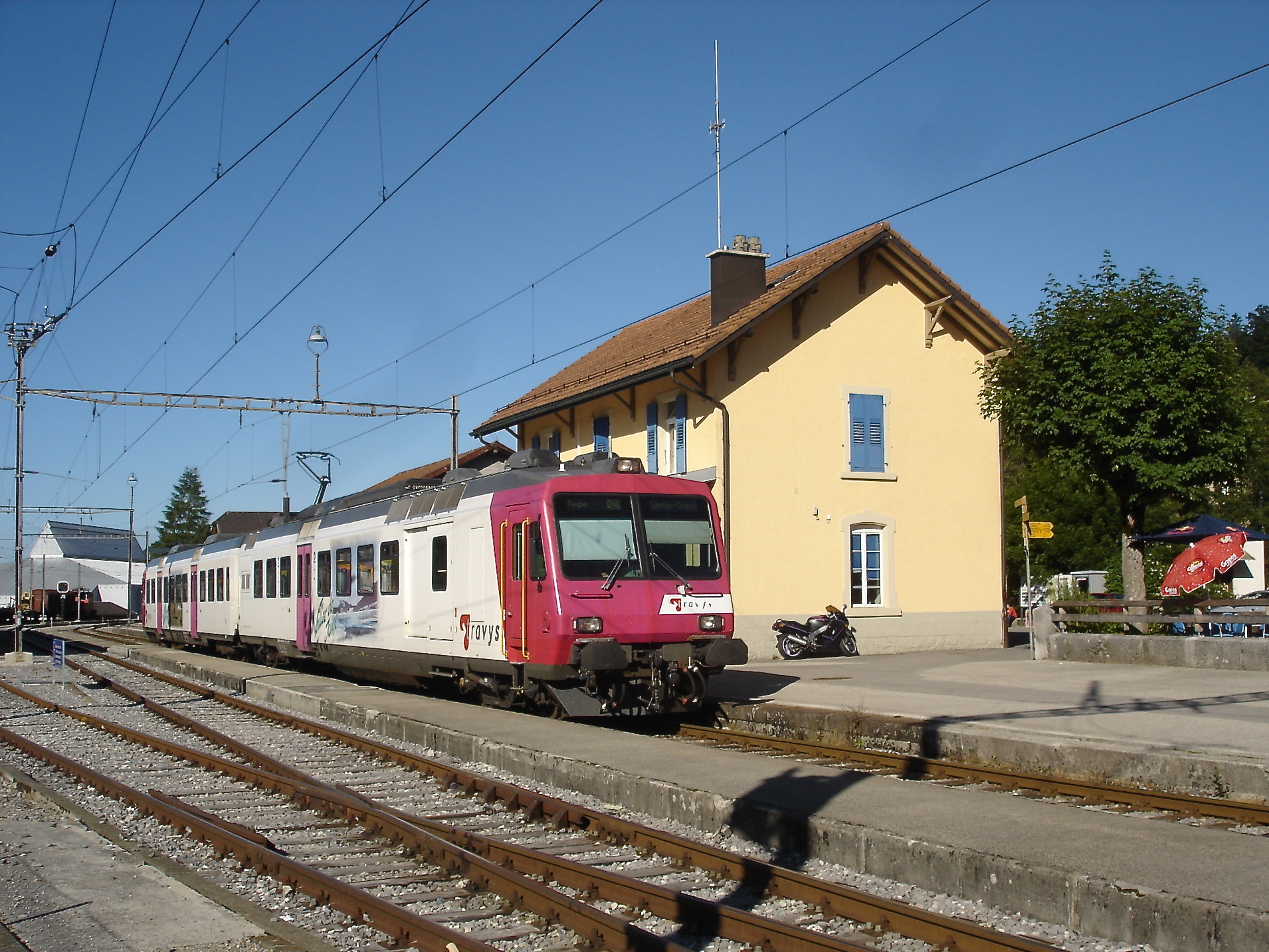
- Travys RBDe 4/4 568 384 push-pull train in Sentier-Orient

Overview
- Dates of operation: 1899–2001
- Successor: Travys

Technical
- Track gauge: 1,435 mm (4 ft 8 1/2 in) standard gauge
- Electrification: 15 kV/16.7 Hz AC overhead catenary
- Length: 12.8 km (8.0 mi)
Route map
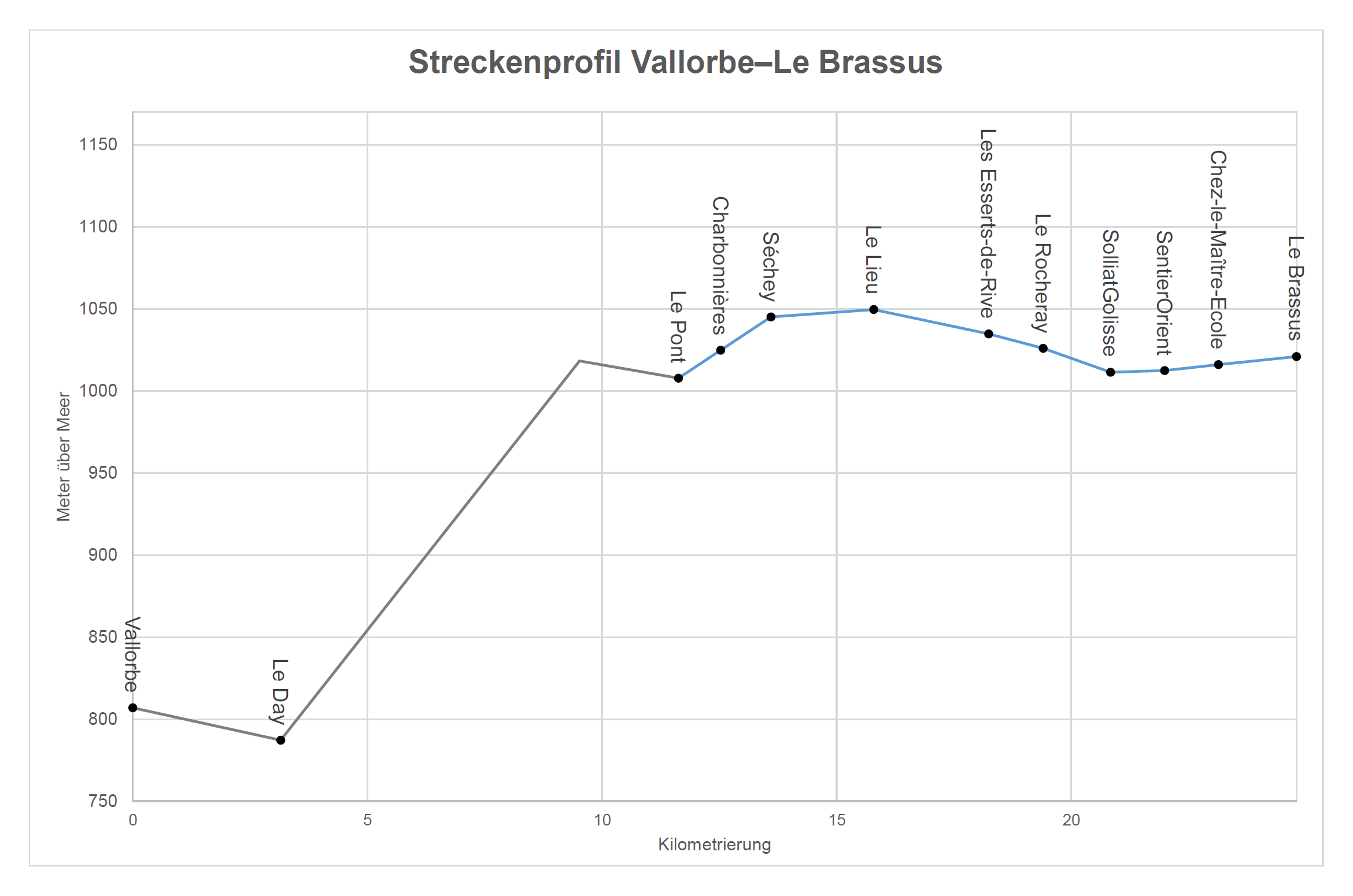
Vallorbe–Le Day–Le Pont–Le Brassus line profile grey: SBB section blue: Travys section
- Source: Swiss railway atlas

The Pont–Brassus Railway (French: Chemin de fer Pont–Brassus; PBr) was a railway company in the Swiss canton of Vaud. It built a standard gauge line from Le Pont parallel to the north shore of the Lac de Joux to Le Brassus. The line has been owned by the Travys regional transport company since 2001. Passenger traffic on the line is operated by Swiss Federal Railways (SBB). Trains run continuously from Vallorbe via Le Pont to Le Brassus. They operate hourly on non school days and half-hourly on school days.

== History ==
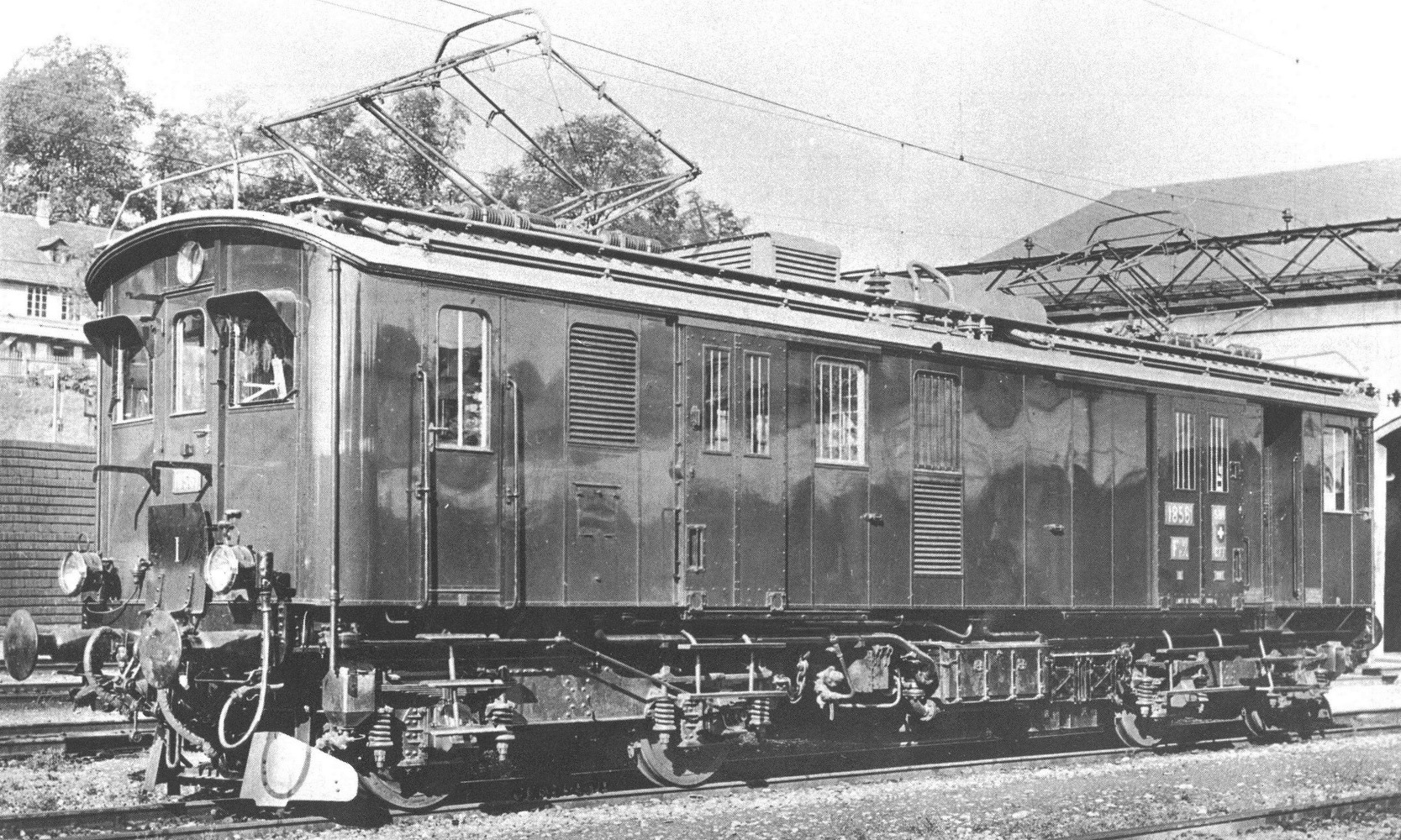
After the electrification in the Vallée de Joux, the SBB used Fe 4/4 18509 to 18511 railcars, which were equipped with regenerative brakes because of the large descent between Le Pont and Le Day.

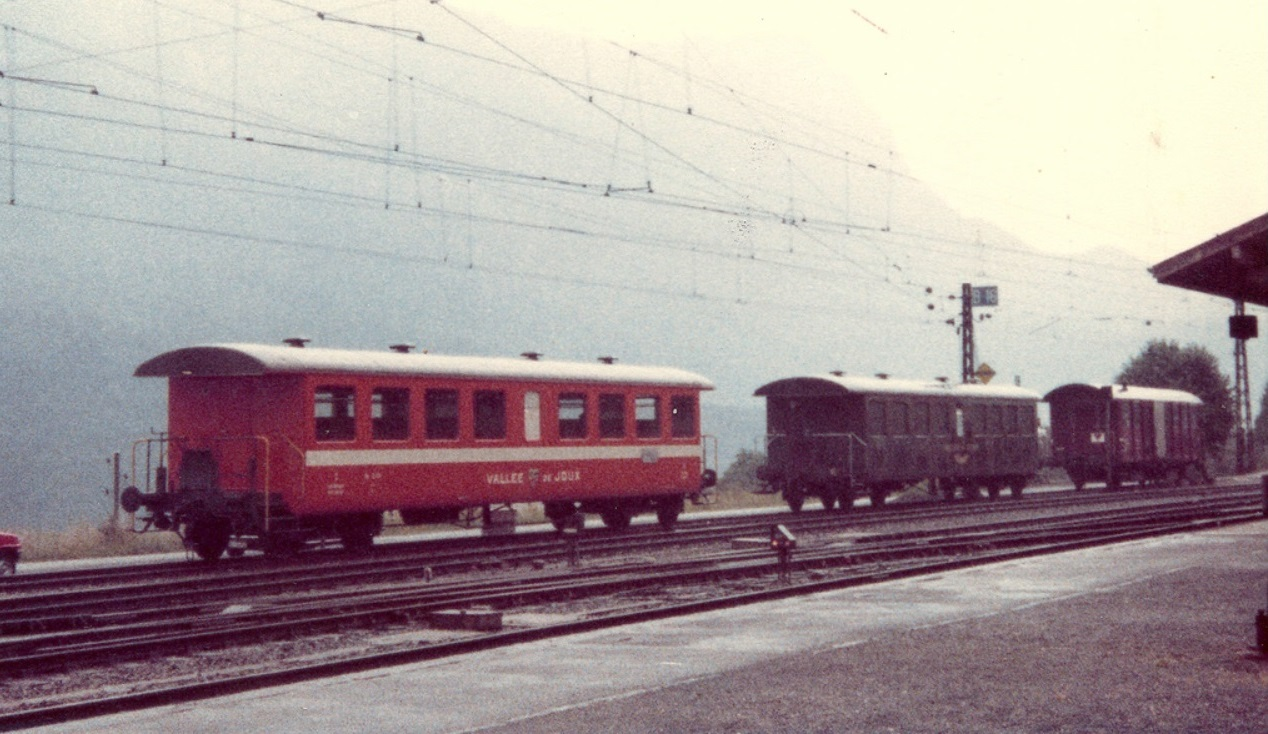
The two light-metal cars Bi 475 (centre) und Bi 476 (left, in VST uniform orange (Note: The Verband Schweizerischer Transportunternehmungen ("Association of Swiss transport companies", VST, now Verband öffentlicher Verkehr) sought to improve the safety of public transport vehicles in traffic by having them painted a uniform orange in 1974.)) of Seetal class procured by the Le Pont–Le Brassus Railway in 1950 together with the SBB.

In response to a petition from the residents of the valleys in 1867, a tunnel was built through the Mont d'Orzeires, which had a dual purpose, on the one hand it would serve the railway, and on the other hand, it would channel floodwater from the valley during an extraordinary flood. Lake Brenet used to drain naturally underground, although it now operates as a hydroelectric reservoir.

The Pont–Vallorbe Railway (Chemin de fer Pont–Vallorbe; PV) opened the railway line between Vallorbe and Le Pont on 31 October 1886. As a result, the PBr was founded to extend the branch line further into the Vallée de Joux. Traffic between Le Pont and Le Brassus was started on 21 August 1899. The PBr had only passenger cars and freight wagons, but none of its own locomotives. So operations were carried out from the beginning by the JS and after its nationalisation on 1 May 1903 by the SBB.

The economic crisis of the 1930s led to a marked decline in freight and passenger traffic; operations with steam locomotives proved to be too unprofitable. For this reason, electrification was approved and was completed on 1 October 1938. Operating costs would be significantly reduced as a result. As the line continued to be managed by the SBB, the use of its power system was adopted.

Frequencies of passenger services declined markedly in the 1980s, not least because of the poor timetable. Therefore, the track has been fundamentally modernised and a new timetable concept with modern rolling stock (SBB RBDe 4/4) has been introduced.

The PBr was absorbed into a new company, Travys on 1 January 2001.

In 2008, the terminal station in Le Brassus was relocated during station modernisation by about 100 metres towards Le Pont. This shortened the total length of the line from 24.55 km to 24.46 km.

== Rolling stock ==
Model class		Manufacturer	Build year	Source	Quantity		Scrapped	Remarks
Class	Number	Manufacturer	Build year	Source	Total	Current	Scrapped	Remarks
Lokomotives
Re 420	503	SLM; BBC/MFO/SAAS	1967	BLS (2013)	(ac)1	1		ex SBB Re 4/4^{II} 11119
Railcars
RBDe 568; RBDe 560	384–385	SWA/SIG/ABB	1989/2009		2	2		NPZ RBDe 4/4 2184–2185
ABDe 538	316	SIG/SWS; SAAS/BBC/MFO	1966	THB (2004)	(ac)1	0	2018	ex GFM 171, ex MThB 16; transferred to VHMThB
RBDe 567	(315) 174	SIG/SWS/BBC	1983	TRN (2013)	(ac)1	1		ex RVT 105, ex TRN 315
Control car
ABt 39-43	984–985	SWP/SIG/ABB	1989/2009		2	2		NPZ
Bt 80-35	904		1964	THB (2004)	(ac)1	0	2018	ex GFM 302, ex MThB 204; transferred to VHMThB
ABt 80-33	(202) 375	SWP	1964/1983	TRN (2013)	(ac)1	1		ex RVT 202, ex TRN 202
Passenger cars
B 20-35	(304) 504	SWP/SIG	1985	TRN (2008)	(ac)1	1		«B Lego»; ex RVT 304, ex TRN 304
B 29-43	384–385	BT	2009		2	2		NPZ Inova
B 20-35	(301) 475	FFA	1965	TRN (2013)	(ac)1	1		EW I, ex RVT 301
B 20-35	536		1981	BLS (2019)	(ac)1	1		«B Lego»; ex GBS 780, ex BLS 780
Motor cars
Te 218	(301) 101		1946	SBB (1982)	(ac)1	0		ex SBB Te 2/2 957; scrapped
Tm 238	(302) 102		1957	SBB (1989)	(ac)1	0	2011	ex SBB Tm^{I} 420; transferred to CTVJ (Tm 230 320)
Tm 238	(303) 103	RACO	1992		1	1		
Tm 238	(304) 104		1962	BLS (1997)	(ac)1			ex BLS 61
Tm 238	(305) 105		1961	SBB (2000)	(ac)1			ex SBB Tm^{I} 458
Te 218	(306) 106		1967	SBB (2000)	(ac)1	1		ex SBB Te^{II} 86
Tem^{III}	329		1956	SBB (2012)	(ac)1	1		ex SBB Tem^{III} 329, parts of 356
ac= acquired from third-party stock (used vehicle); cv= converted from own inventory

Historic passenger cars

- BC 11 (1875), acquired by SBB in 1914 (NOB BC 846, SBB BC 4296), abandoned in 1938
- C 21–22 (1899), sold to SBB for demolition in 1952
- BC4 65 (1950), from 1956 AB4 65, from 1963 ABi 65, from 1970 Bi 475, since 1984 in the CTVJ (No. 4420 red)
- C4 476 (1950), from 1956 C4 476, from 1963 B4 476, from 1970 Bi 4756, Since 1993 with CTVJ (No. 7476 brown)
- B 477 (1939), acquired by SBB in 1984 (B 50 85 23-33 008-8)
