= La Tour-de-Peilz =

- Municipality
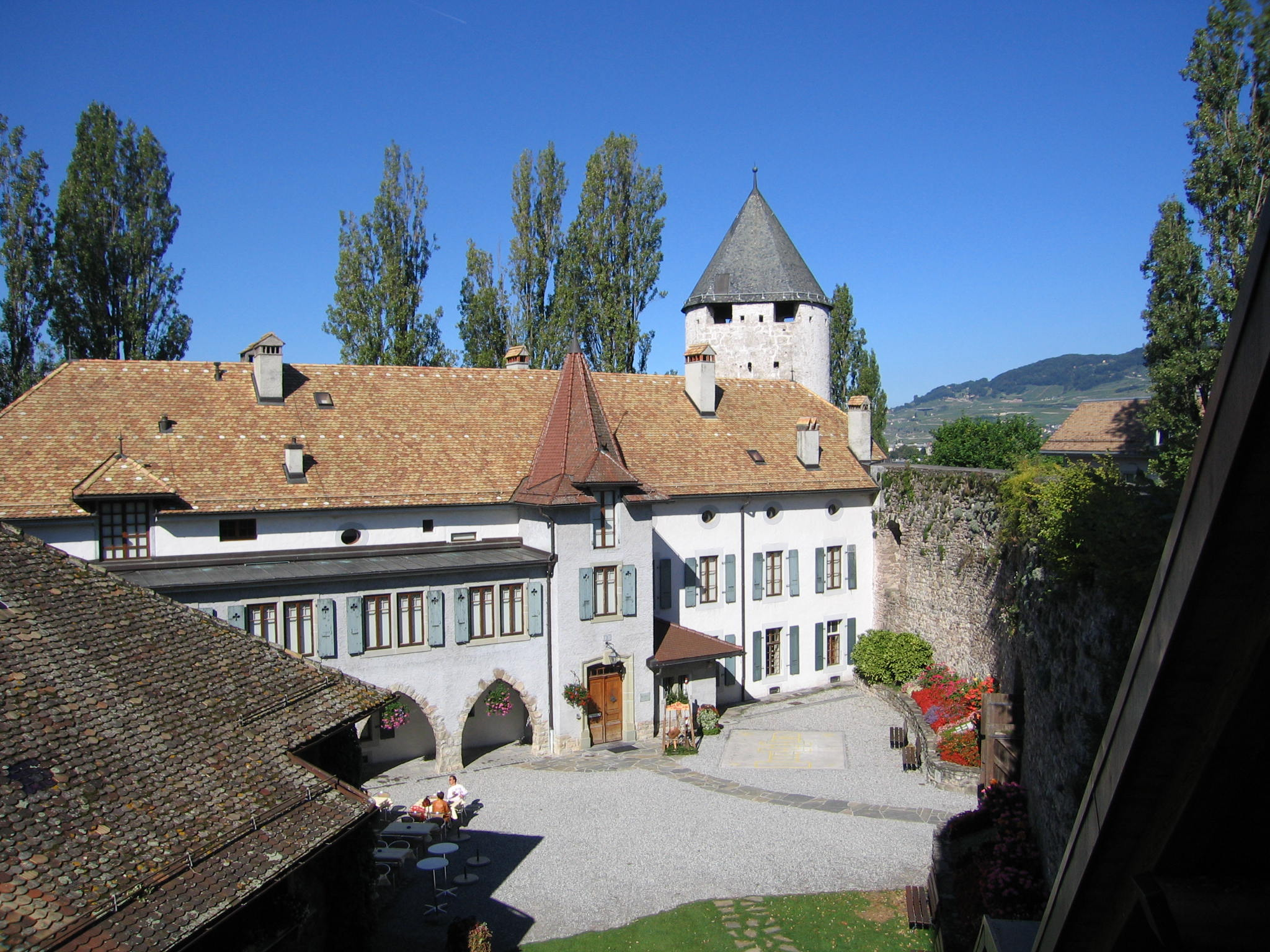
- Musée Suisse du Jeu

- Flag Coat of arms
- Location of La Tour-de-Peilz
- Location within Switzerland Location within Canton of Vaud
- Coordinates: 46°27′N 06°52′E
- Country: Switzerland
- Canton: Vaud
- District: Riviera-Pays-d'Enhaut

Government
  - Mayor: Syndic (list)

Area
  - Total: 3.2 km^{2} (1.2 sq mi)
- Elevation: 382 m (1,253 ft)

Population (2004)
  - Total: 10,435
  - Density: 3,300/km^{2} (8,400/sq mi)
- Demonym(s): Les Boélands; Lè Verra
- Time zone: UTC+01:00 (CET)
  - Summer (DST): UTC+02:00 (CEST)
- Postal code: 1814
- SFOS number: 5889
- ISO 3166 code: CH-VD
- Localities: Burier
- Surrounded by: Saint-Légier-La Chiésaz, Blonay, Montreux, Vevey
- Twin towns: Ornans (France), Thalwil (Switzerland)
- Website: www.la-tour-de-peilz.ch

La Tour-de-Peilz (French pronunciation: [la tuʁ də pɛ]; Arpitan: La Tor-de-Pêlz) is a municipality in Riviera-Pays-d'Enhaut District in the canton of Vaud in Switzerland. The city is located on Lake Geneva between Montreux and Vevey (their agglomeration counting some 80,000 inhabitants).

== History ==
In the area Celt, Roman and Burgundian remains have been excavated. In the Middle Ages it was under the bishops of Sion and the counts of Geneva, until it was acquired by Savoy.

On 8 June 1476, after a heroic resistance, its inhabitants were massacred by mountain warriors from Haut-Simmental, led by the Bernese Niklaus Zurkinden. Later the canton of Bern conquered the village along with the rest of the region. It remained part of Bern until the foundation of the canton of Vaud in 1803.

== Geography ==
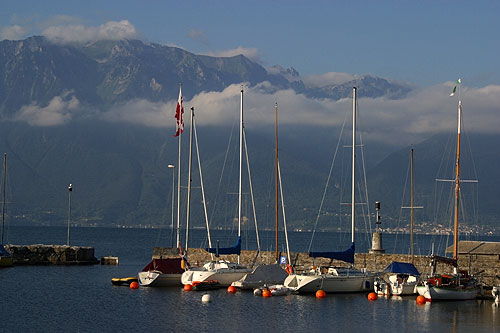
La Tour-de-Peilz harbor

Aerial view from 600 m by Walter Mittelholzer (1919)

La Tour-de-Peilz has an area, as of 2009, of 3.2 square kilometers (1.2 mi^{2}). Of this area, 0.95 km^{2} (0.37 mi^{2}) or 29.3% is used for agricultural purposes, while 0.15 km^{2} (0.058 mi^{2}) or 4.6% is forested. Of the rest of the land, 2.15 km^{2} (0.83 mi^{2}) or 66.4% is settled (buildings or roads), 0.01 km^{2} (2.5 acres) or 0.3% is either rivers or lakes.

Of the built up area, housing and buildings made up 46.3% and transportation infrastructure made up 13.9%. while parks, green belts and sports fields made up 4.6%. Out of the forested land, 1.2% of the total land area is heavily forested and 3.4% is covered with orchards or small clusters of trees. Of the agricultural land, 2.5% is used for growing crops and 11.4% is pastures, while 15.4% is used for orchards or vine crops. All the water in the municipality is in lakes.

The municipality was part of the Vevey District until it was dissolved on 31 August 2006, and La Tour-de-Peilz became part of the new district of Riviera-Pays-d'Enhaut.

== Coat of arms ==
The blazon of the municipal coat of arms is Per pale Argent and Gules, a Castle counterchanged.

== Demographics ==
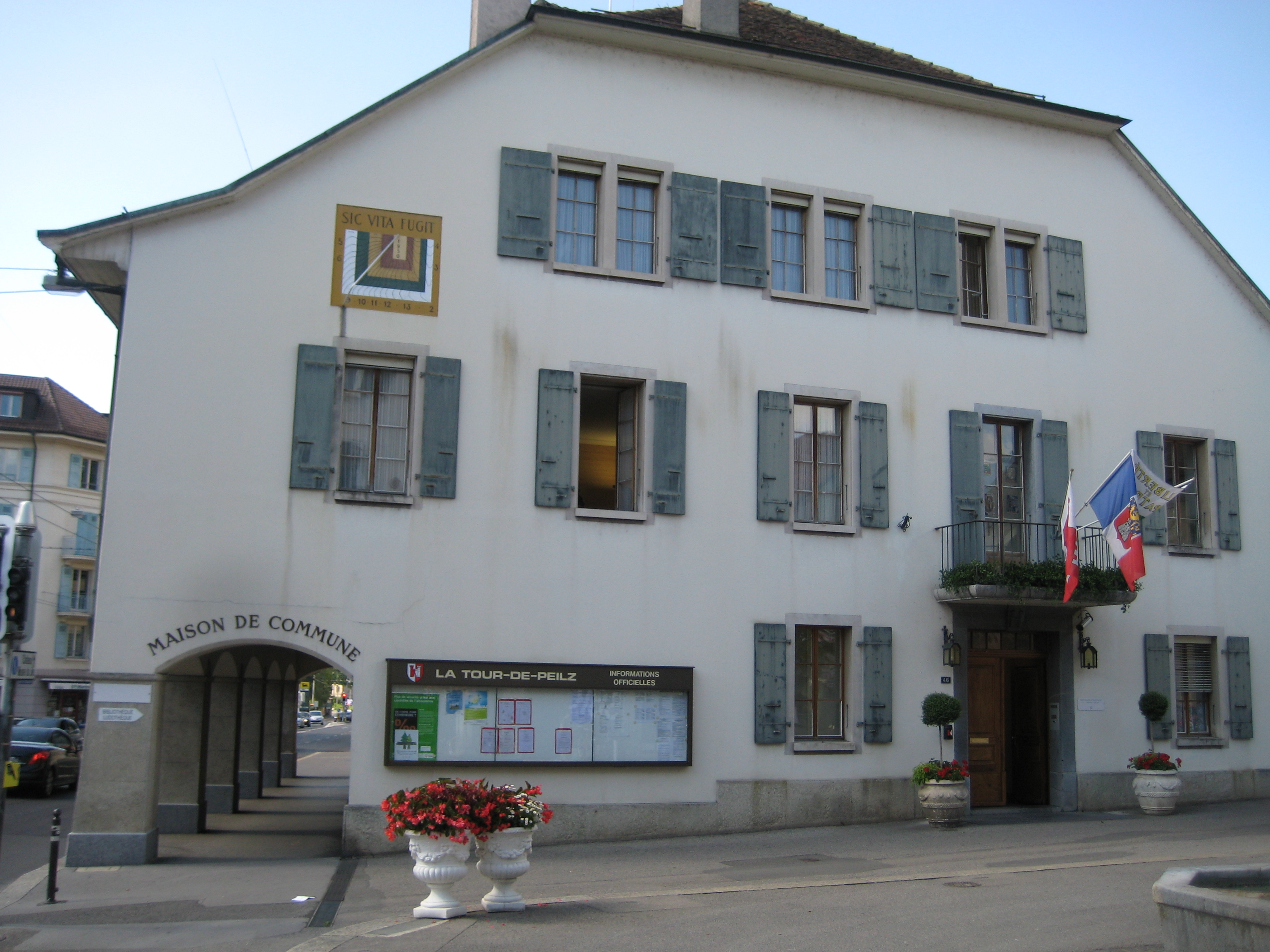
La Tour-de-Peilz city hall

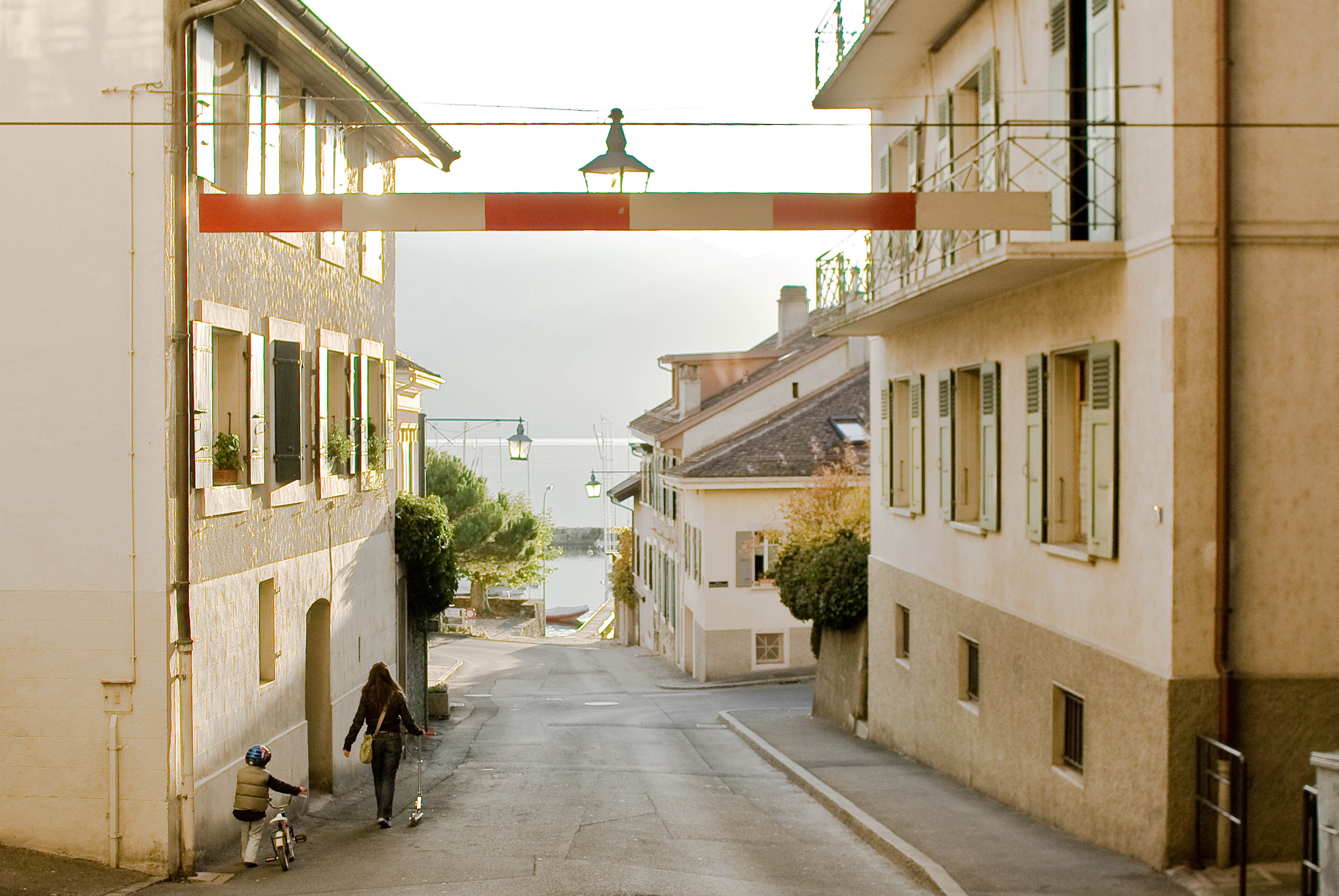
La Tour-de-Peilz street

La Tour-de-Peilz has a population (as of December 2020) of 12,068. As of 2008, 25.6% of the population are resident foreign nationals. Over the last 10 years (1999–2009) the population has changed at a rate of 7.3%. It has changed at a rate of 7.8% due to migration and at a rate of -0.2% due to births and deaths.

Most of the population (as of 2000) speaks French (8,490 or 83.0%) as their first language, with German being second most common (605 or 5.9%) and Italian being third (295 or 2.9%). There are 5 people who speak Romansh.

The age distribution, as of 2009, in La Tour-de-Peilz is; 1,092 children or 10.1% of the population are between 0 and 9 years old and 1,233 teenagers or 11.5% are between 10 and 19. Of the adult population, 1,152 people or 10.7% of the population are between 20 and 29 years old. 1,325 people or 12.3% are between 30 and 39, 1,702 people or 15.8% are between 40 and 49, and 1,313 people or 12.2% are between 50 and 59. The senior population distribution is 1,304 people or 12.1% of the population are between 60 and 69 years old, 969 people or 9.0% are between 70 and 79, there are 571 people or 5.3% who are between 80 and 89, and there are 104 people or 1.0% who are 90 and older.

As of 2000, there were 3,882 people who were single and never married in the municipality. There were 4,881 married individuals, 726 widows or widowers and 741 individuals who are divorced.

As of 2000, there were 4,870 private households in the municipality, and an average of 2.1 persons per household. There were 2,012 households that consist of only one person and 192 households with five or more people. Out of a total of 4,951 households that answered this question, 40.6% were households made up of just one person and there were 28 adults who lived with their parents. Of the rest of the households, there are 1,284 married couples without children, 1,164 married couples with children There were 296 single parents with a child or children. There were 86 households that were made up of unrelated people and 81 households that were made up of some sort of institution or another collective housing.

In 2000 there were 528 single family homes (or 44.5% of the total) out of a total of 1,186 inhabited buildings. There were 456 multi-family buildings (38.4%), along with 159 multi-purpose buildings that were mostly used for housing (13.4%) and 43 other use buildings (commercial or industrial) that also had some housing (3.6%).

In 2000, a total of 4,780 apartments (88.2% of the total) were permanently occupied, while 456 apartments (8.4%) were seasonally occupied and 186 apartments (3.4%) were empty. As of 2009, the construction rate of new housing units was 2.1 new units per 1000 residents. The vacancy rate for the municipality, in 2010, was 0.35%.

The historical population is given in the following chart:

== Heritage sites ==
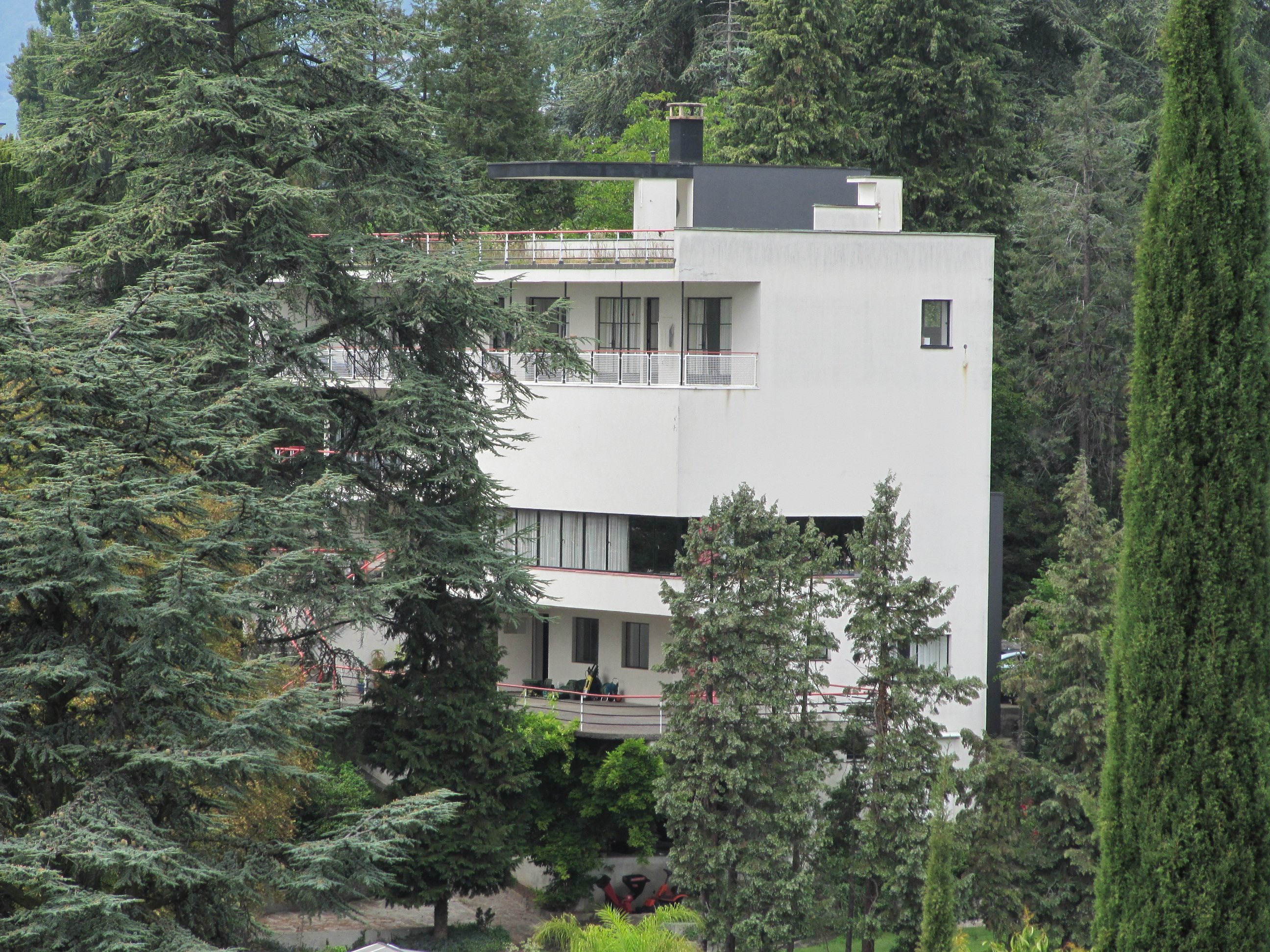
Villa Kenwin

The Villa Kenwin is listed as a Swiss heritage site of national significance.

The Swiss Museum of Games is housed in the castle of La Tour-de-Peilz. Founded in 1987, it offers a family friendly display of games from across the world.

== Twin Town ==
La Tour-de-Peilz is twinned with:

- Ornans, France

== Politics ==
In the 2007 federal election the most popular party was the SP which received 24.28% of the vote. The next three most popular parties were the SVP (18.15%), the FDP (14.12%) and the Green Party (14.08%). In the federal election, a total of 2,851 votes were cast, and the voter turnout was 44.9%.

== Economy ==
As of 2010, La Tour-de-Peilz had an unemployment rate of 4.5%. As of 2008, there were 64 people employed in the primary economic sector and about 13 businesses involved in this sector. 299 people were employed in the secondary sector and there were 70 businesses in this sector. 2,236 people were employed in the tertiary sector, with 259 businesses in this sector. There were 4,762 residents of the municipality who were employed in some capacity, of which females made up 46.3% of the workforce.

In 2008 the total number of full-time equivalent jobs was 2,141. The number of jobs in the primary sector was 40, of which 37 were in agriculture and 3 were in fishing or fisheries. The number of jobs in the secondary sector was 280 of which 67 or (23.9%) were in manufacturing and 184 (65.7%) were in construction. The number of jobs in the tertiary sector was 1,821. In the tertiary sector; 323 or 17.7% were in wholesale or retail sales or the repair of motor vehicles, 22 or 1.2% were in the movement and storage of goods, 125 or 6.9% were in a hotel or restaurant, 27 or 1.5% were in the information industry, 22 or 1.2% were the insurance or financial industry, 565 or 31.0% were technical professionals or scientists, 310 or 17.0% were in education and 252 or 13.8% were in health care.

In 2000, there were 1,181 workers who commuted into the municipality and 3,726 workers who commuted away. The municipality is a net exporter of workers, with about 3.2 workers leaving the municipality for every one entering. Of the working population, 21.9% used public transportation to get to work, and 57.5% used a private car.

== Religion ==
From the 2000 census, 3,859 or 37.7% were Roman Catholic, while 3,788 or 37.0% belonged to the Swiss Reformed Church. Of the rest of the population, there were 207 members of an Orthodox church (or about 2.02% of the population), there were 8 individuals (or about 0.08% of the population) who belonged to the Christian Catholic Church, and there were 545 individuals (or about 5.33% of the population) who belonged to another Christian church. There were 17 individuals (or about 0.17% of the population) who were Jewish, and 203 (or about 1.98% of the population) who were Islamic. There were 43 individuals who were Buddhist, 12 individuals who were Hindu and 11 individuals who belonged to another church. 1,303 (or about 12.74% of the population) belonged to no church, are agnostic or atheist, and 482 individuals (or about 4.71% of the population) did not answer the question.

== Education ==
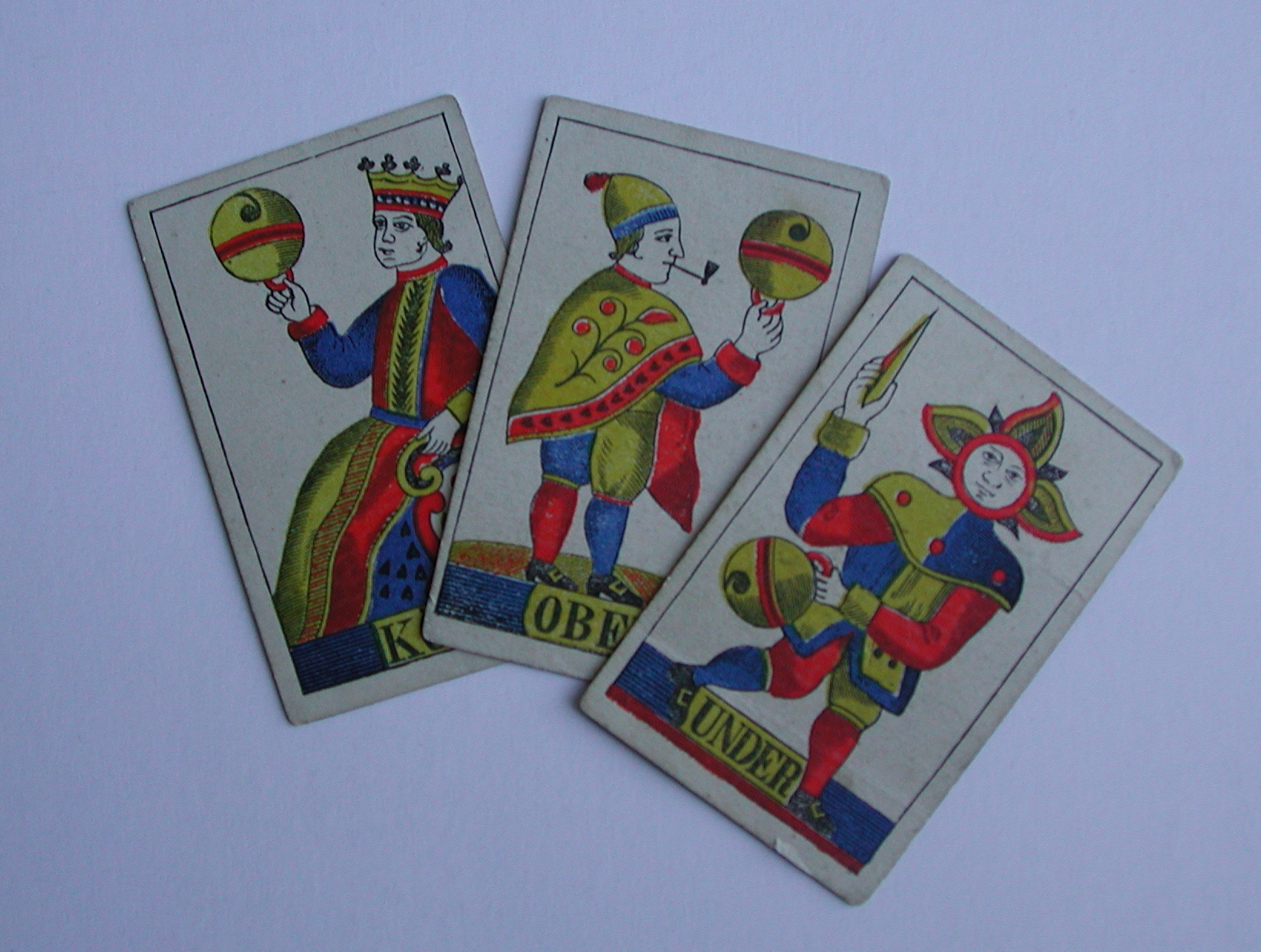
Swiss-German playing cards from the Swiss Museum of Games in La Tour-de-Peilz

In La Tour-de-Peilz about 3,931 or (38.4%) of the population have completed non-mandatory upper secondary education, and 1,857 or (18.2%) have completed additional higher education (either university or a Fachhochschule). Of the 1,857 who completed tertiary schooling, 46.3% were Swiss men, 28.0% were Swiss women, 14.6% were non-Swiss men and 11.1% were non-Swiss women.

In the 2009/2010 school year there were a total of 1,221 students in the La Tour-de-Peilz school district. In the Vaud cantonal school system, two years of non-obligatory pre-school are provided by the political districts. During the school year, the political district provided pre-school care for a total of 817 children of which 456 children (55.8%) received subsidized pre-school care. The canton's primary school program requires students to attend for four years. There were 657 students in the municipal primary school program. The obligatory lower secondary school program lasts for six years and there were 543 students in those schools. There were also 21 students who were home schooled or attended another non-traditional school.

As of 2000, there were 1,136 students in La Tour-de-Peilz who came from another municipality, while 406 residents attended schools outside the municipality.

AGSB University is located in the city.

La Tour-de-Peilz is home to 1 museum, the Musée suisse du jeu (Swiss Museum of Games). In 2009 it was visited by 19,244 visitors (the average in previous years was 21,083).

La Tour-de-Peilz is home to the Bibliothèque communale library. The library has (as of 2008) 19,223 books or other media, and loaned out 46,152 items in the same year. It was open a total of 227 days with average of 20 hours per week during that year.

== Transportation ==
The municipality has two railway stations, Burier and La Tour-de-Peilz. Both are on the Simplon line and have regular service to Grandson, Lausanne, and Aigle.

== Notable people ==
- Prince Adalbert of Prussia died there in 1948.
- Princess Adalbert of Prussia died there in 1971.
- The Princess of Liegnitz owned a villa here that is currently called Rive-Reine.
- Archduchess Isabella of Austria died there in 1973.
- Businessman Jean-Claude Biver, CEO of numerous watchmakers.
- The painter Gustave Courbet lived there from 1874 until his death in December 1877.
- The novelist A.J. Cronin is buried there.
- Model and singer-songwriter Patrick Juvet, grew up in the town.
- Music producer Robert John "Mutt" Lange has lived in the town off and on over the years.
- Tennis player Manuela Maleeva-Fragniere resides with her husband and three children.
- The cellist Dimitry Markevitch was born there in 1923.
- John Pierpont "J.P." Morgan, American financier and banker who dominated corporate finance on Wall Street throughout the Gilded Age, went to school at Bellerive in town.
- Jacqueline de Quattro (born 1960), served on the town council
