= Saxon railway station =

Railway station in Saxon, Switzerland

Saxon
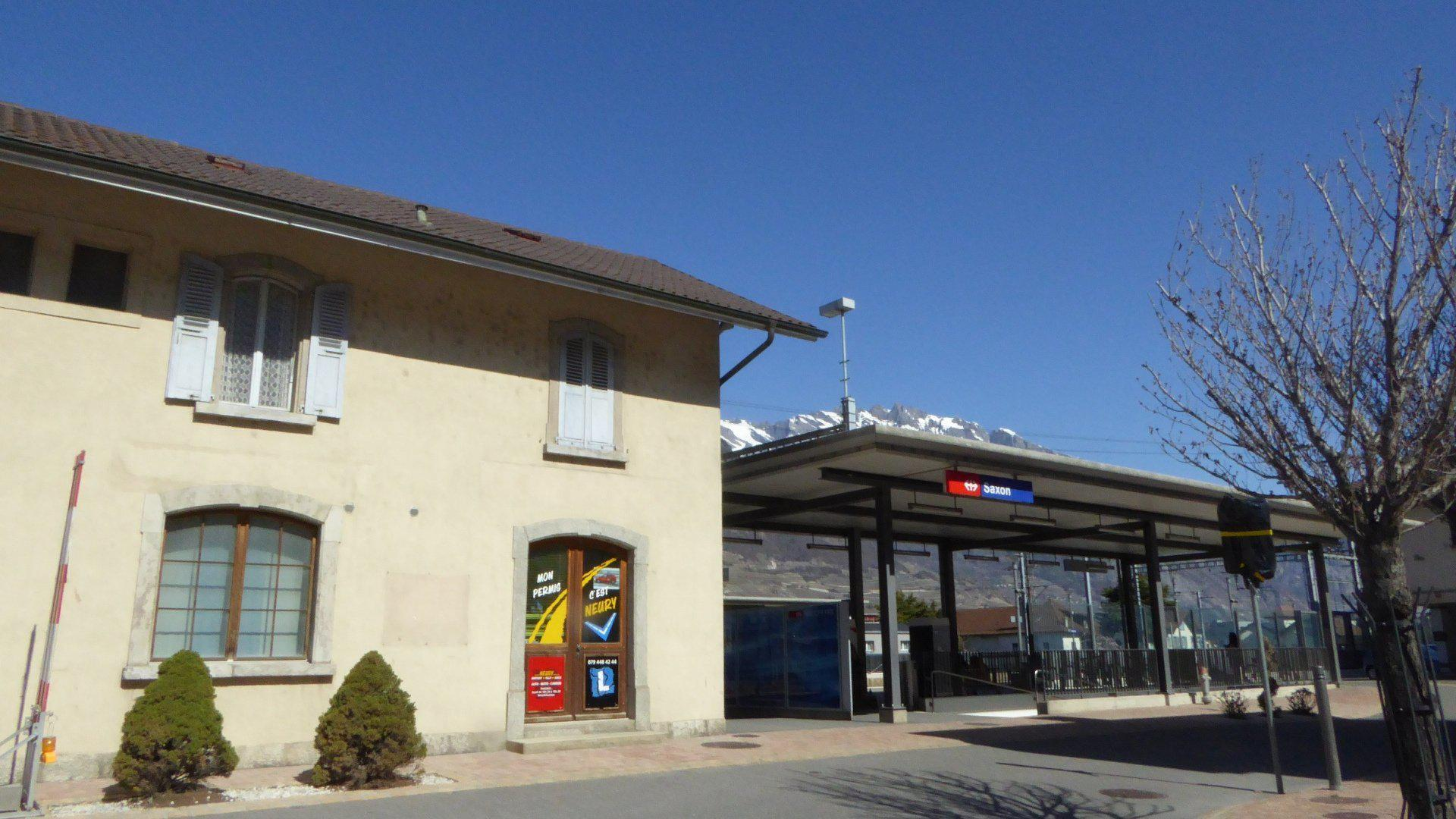
- The station building in 2019

General information
- Location: Saxon; Switzerland
- Coordinates: 46°08′58″N 7°10′24″E
- Elevation: 465 m (1,526 ft)
- Owner: Swiss Federal Railways
- Line: Simplon line
- Distance: 75.3 km (46.8 mi) from Lausanne
- Platforms: 3: 1 island platform; 1 side platform
- Tracks: 3
- Train operators: RegionAlps

Construction
- Cycle facilities: Yes (22 spaces)
- Accessible: Yes

Other information
- Station code: 8501502 (SAX)

Passengers
- 2023: 1'700 per weekday (RegionAlps)

Services
Preceding station	RegionAlps	Following station
Charrat-Fully towards St-Gingolph	R91	Riddes towards Brig
Charrat-Fully towards Monthey	R91	Riddes towards Brig
Location

Saxon railway station (French: Gare de Saxon, German: Bahnhof Saxon) is a railway station in the municipality of Saxon, in the Swiss canton of Valais. It is an intermediate stop on the Simplon line and is served by local trains only.

== Services ==
As of the December 2024 timetable change, the following services stop at Saxon:

- Regio: half-hourly service between Monthey and Brig, with every other train continuing from Monthey to St-Gingolph.
