= Charrat-Fully railway station =

Railway station in Charrat, Switzerland

Charrat-Fully
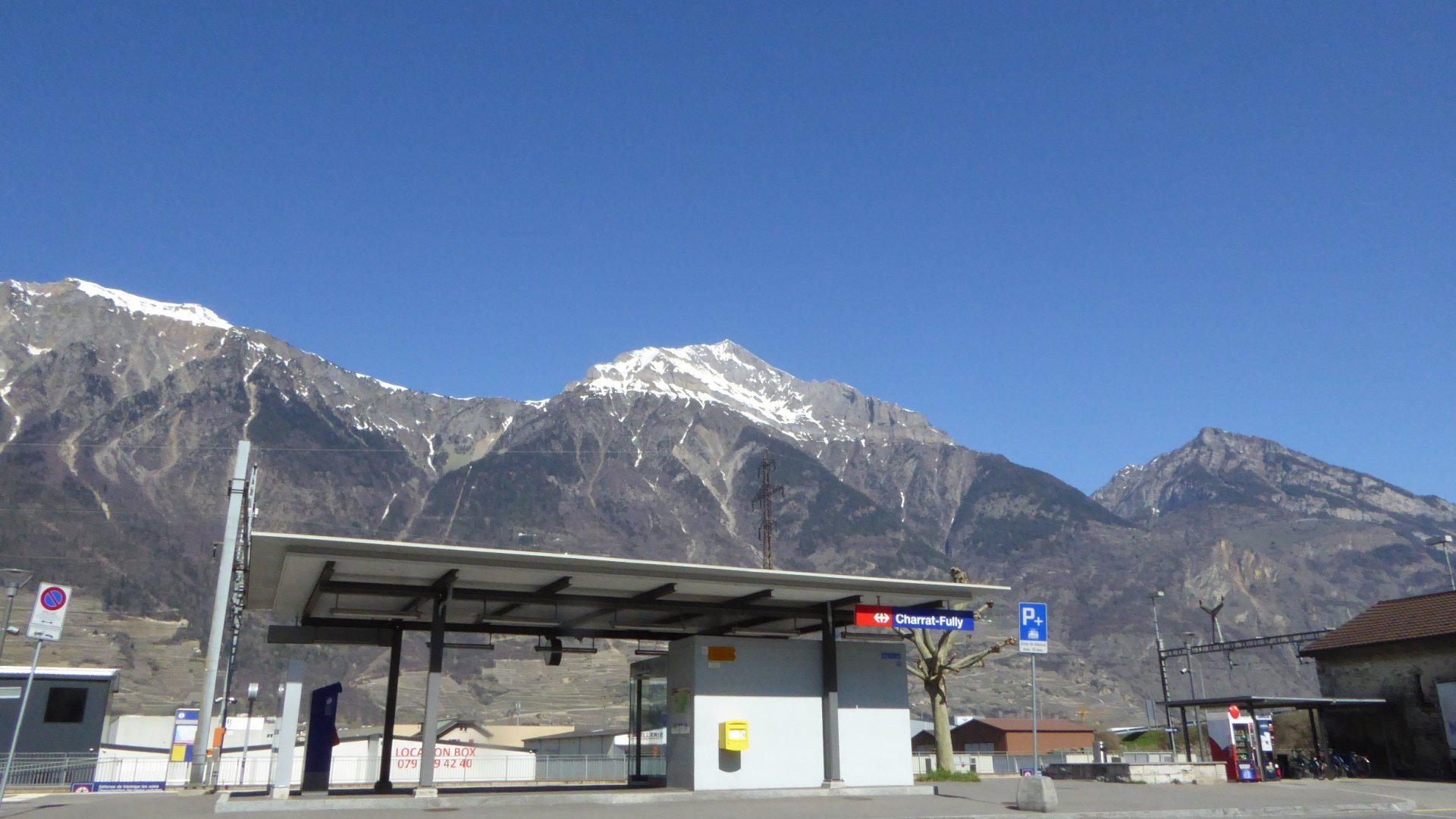
- The station platform in 2019

General information
- Location: Charrat; Switzerland
- Coordinates: 46°07′37″N 7°07′35″E
- Elevation: 460 m (1,510 ft)
- Owner: Swiss Federal Railways
- Line: Simplon line
- Distance: 70.9 km (44.1 mi) from Lausanne
- Platforms: 2 side platforms
- Tracks: 2
- Train operators: RegionAlps

Construction
- Parking: Yes (14 spaces)
- Cycle facilities: Yes (21 spaces)
- Accessible: Yes

Other information
- Station code: 8501501 (CHAR)

Passengers
- 2023: 710 per weekday (RegionAlps)

Services
Preceding station	RegionAlps	Following station
Martigny towards St-Gingolph	R91	Saxon towards Brig
Martigny towards Monthey	R91	Saxon towards Brig
Location

Charrat-Fully railway station (French: Gare de Charrat-Fully, German: Bahnhof Charrat-Fully) is a railway station in the municipality of Charrat, in the Swiss canton of Valais. It is an intermediate stop on the Simplon line and is served by local trains only.

== Services ==
As of the December 2024 timetable change, the following services stop at Charrat-Fully:

- Regio: half-hourly service between Monthey and Brig, with every other train continuing from Monthey to St-Gingolph.
