= Clarens railway station =

Railway station in Clarens, Switzerland

Clarens
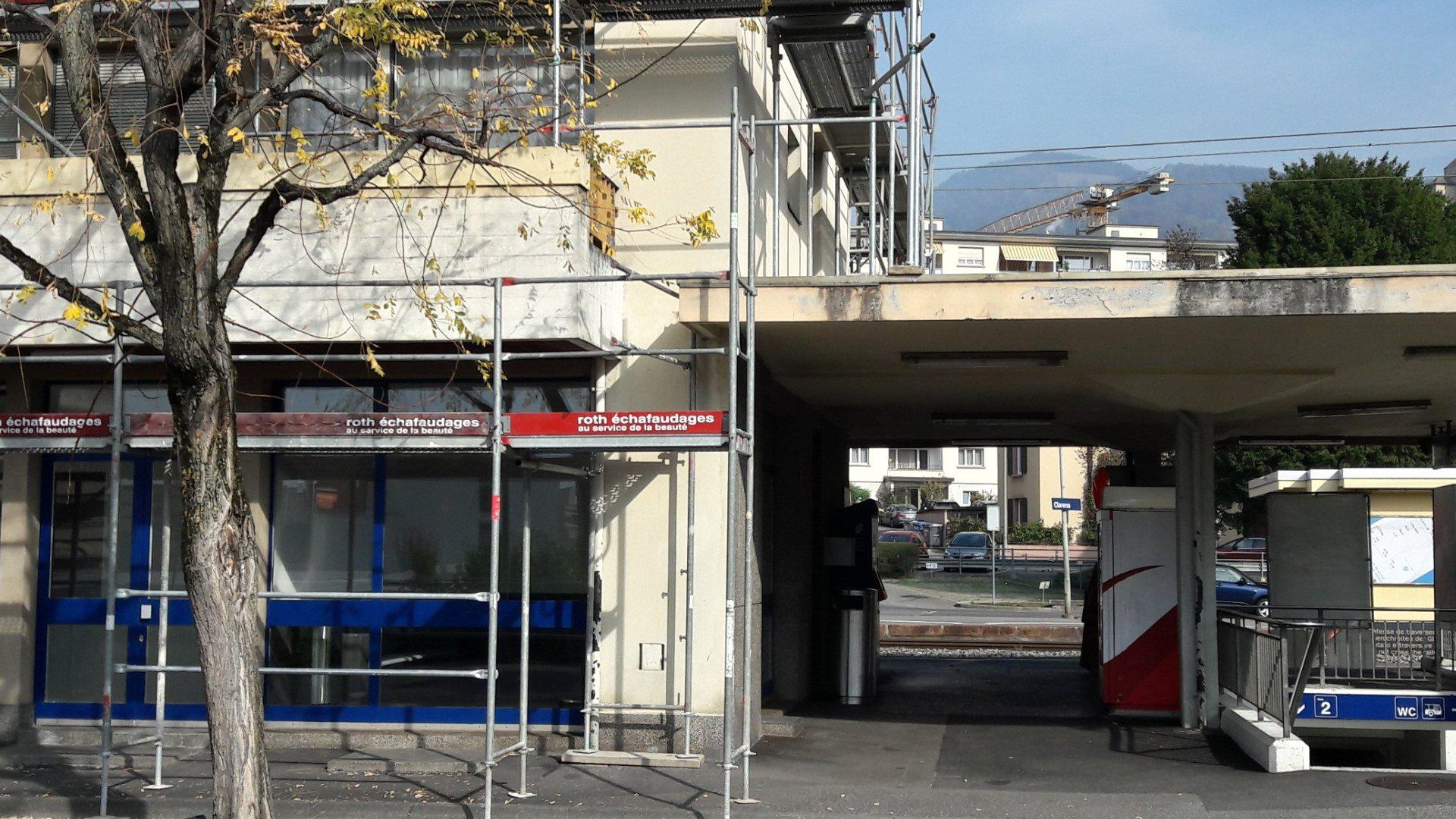
- The station building in 2018

General information
- Location: Clarens; Switzerland
- Coordinates: 46°26′34″N 6°53′45″E
- Elevation: 399 m (1,309 ft)
- Owner: Swiss Federal Railways
- Line: Simplon line
- Distance: 23.1 km (14.4 mi) from Lausanne
- Platforms: 2 (2 side platforms)
- Tracks: 2
- Train operators: Swiss Federal Railways
- Connections: VMCV bus line

Construction
- Parking: Yes (47 spaces)
- Cycle facilities: Yes (72 spaces)
- Accessible: Yes

Other information
- Station code: 8501203 (CL)
- Fare zone: 73 (mobilis)

Passengers
- 2023: 2'500 per weekday (SBB)

Services
Preceding station	SBB CFF FFS	Following station
Burier towards Lausanne	RegioExpress Limited service	Montreux towards St-Maurice
Preceding station	RER Vaud	Following station
Burier towards Vallorbe	R3	Montreux towards Vevey
Burier towards Le Brassus or Vallorbe	R4	Montreux towards Vevey
Location

Clarens railway station (French: Gare de Clarens) is a railway station in the locality of Clarens, within the municipality of Montreux, in the Swiss canton of Vaud. It is an intermediate stop on the standard gauge Simplon line of Swiss Federal Railways.

== Services ==
As of the December 2024 timetable change, the following services stop at Clarens:

- RegioExpress: two round-trips in each direction between Lausanne and St-Maurice.
- RER Vaud R3 / R4: half-hourly (hourly on weekends) service between Vallorbe and Bex; hourly service to Le Brassus; limited service from Bex to St-Maurice.
