= La Tour-de-Peilz railway station =

Railway station in La Tour-de-Peilz, Switzerland

La Tour-de-Peilz
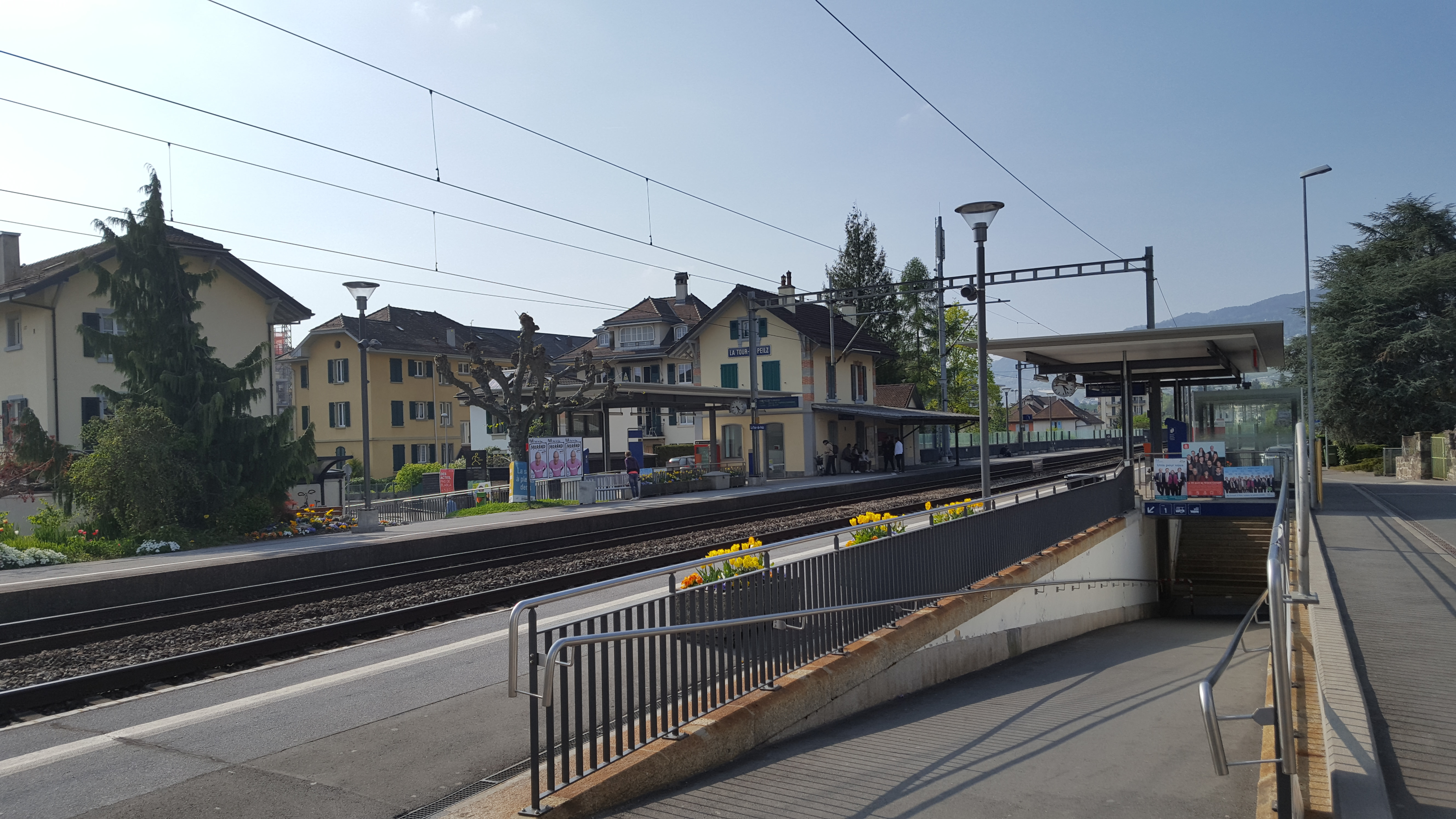
- The station building in 2017

General information
- Location: La Tour-de-Peilz; Switzerland
- Coordinates: 46°27′20″N 6°51′34″E
- Elevation: 390 m (1,280 ft)
- Owner: Swiss Federal Railways
- Line: Simplon line
- Distance: 19.9 km (12.4 mi) from Lausanne
- Platforms: 2 (2 side platforms)
- Tracks: 2
- Train operators: Swiss Federal Railways
- Connections: VMCV buses

Construction
- Parking: Yes
- Cycle facilities: Yes (10 spaces)
- Accessible: Yes

Other information
- Station code: 8501201 (TOUR)
- Fare zone: 70 (mobilis)

Passengers
- 2023: 2'800 per weekday (SBB)

Services
Preceding station	SBB CFF FFS	Following station
Vevey towards Lausanne	RegioExpress Limited service	Burier towards St-Maurice
Preceding station	RER Vaud	Following station
Vevey towards Vallorbe	R3	Burier towards Vevey
Vevey towards Le Brassus or Vallorbe	R4	Burier towards Vevey
Location

La Tour-de-Peilz railway station (French: Gare de La Tour-de-Peilz) is a railway station in the municipality of La Tour-de-Peilz, in the Swiss canton of Vaud. It is an intermediate stop on the standard gauge Simplon line of Swiss Federal Railways.

== Services ==
As of the December 2024 timetable change, the following services stop at La Tour-de-Peilz:

- RegioExpress:
  - single daily round-trip on weekdays to Lausanne.
  - two daily round-trips on weekdays to St-Maurice.
- RER Vaud R3 / R4: half-hourly (hourly on weekends) service between Vallorbe and Bex; hourly service to Le Brassus; limited service from Bex to St-Maurice.
