= Burier railway station =

Railway station in La Tour-de-Peilz, Switzerland

Burier
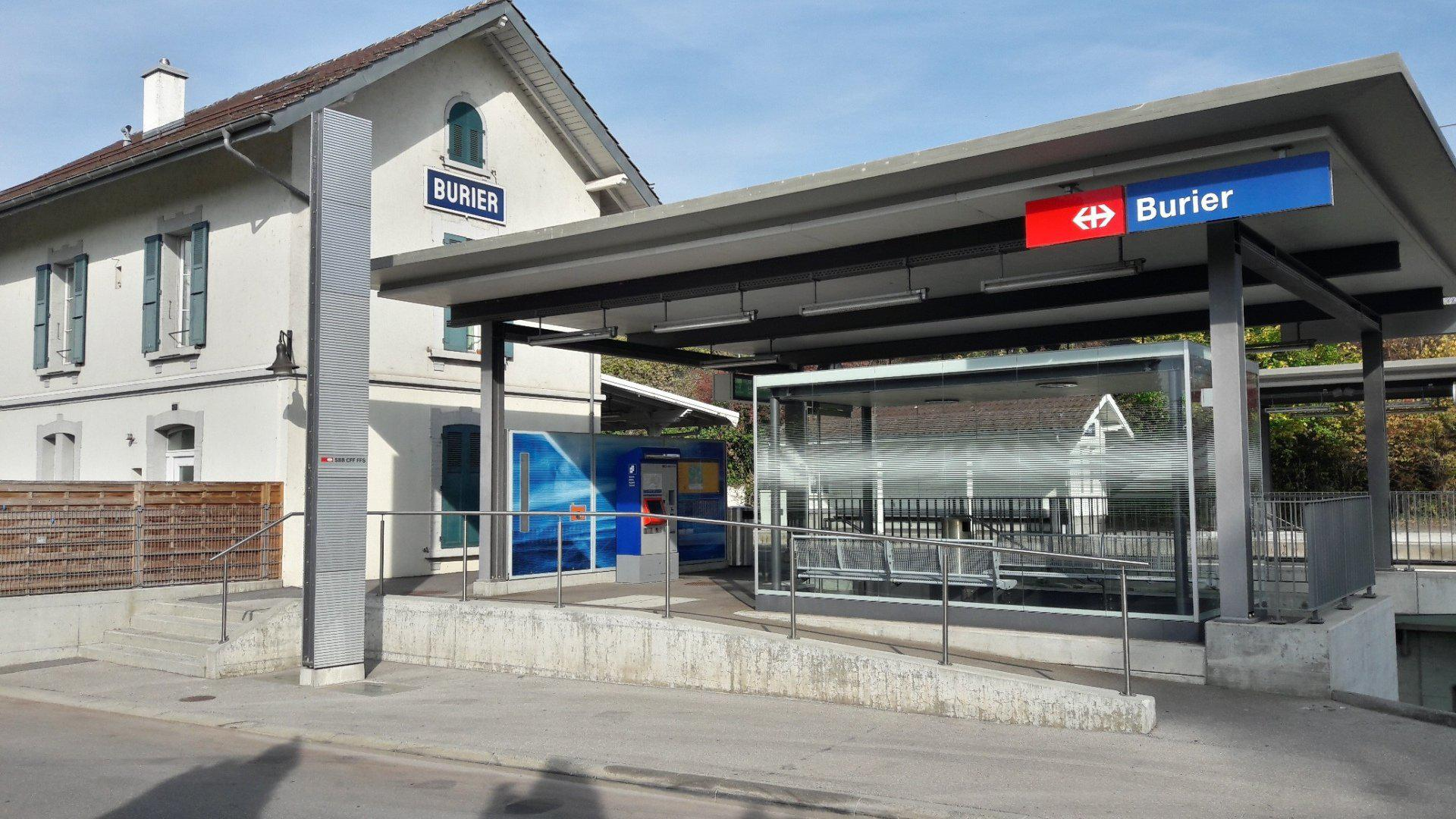
- The station building in 2018

General information
- Location: La Tour-de-Peilz; Switzerland
- Coordinates: 46°26′52″N 6°52′38″E
- Elevation: 395 m (1,296 ft)
- Owner: Swiss Federal Railways
- Line: Simplon line
- Distance: 21.5 km (13.4 mi) from Lausanne
- Platforms: 2 (2 side platforms)
- Tracks: 2
- Train operators: Swiss Federal Railways

Construction
- Parking: Yes
- Cycle facilities: Yes (5 spaces)
- Accessible: Yes

Other information
- Station code: 8501202 (BURI)
- Fare zone: 70 and 73 (mobilis)

Passengers
- 2023: 1'900 per weekday (SBB)

Services
Preceding station	SBB CFF FFS	Following station
La Tour-de-Peilz towards Lausanne	RegioExpress Limited service	Clarens towards St-Maurice
Vevey towards Lausanne	RegioExpress Limited service	Clarens One-way operation
Preceding station	RER Vaud	Following station
La Tour-de-Peilz towards Vallorbe	R3	Clarens towards Vevey
La Tour-de-Peilz towards Le Brassus or Vallorbe	R4	Clarens towards Vevey
Location

Burier railway station (French: Gare de Burier) is a railway station in the municipality of La Tour-de-Peilz, in the Swiss canton of Vaud. It is an intermediate stop on the standard gauge Simplon line of Swiss Federal Railways.

== Services ==
As of the December 2024 timetable change, the following services stop at Burier:

- RegioExpress: two round-trips in each direction between Lausanne and St-Maurice.
- RER Vaud R3 / R4: half-hourly (hourly on weekends) service between Vallorbe and Bex; hourly service to Le Brassus; limited service from Bex to St-Maurice.
