= Le Day Viaduct =

Railway bridge in Vallorbe, Switzerland

Coordinates: 46.7223°N 6.3960°E

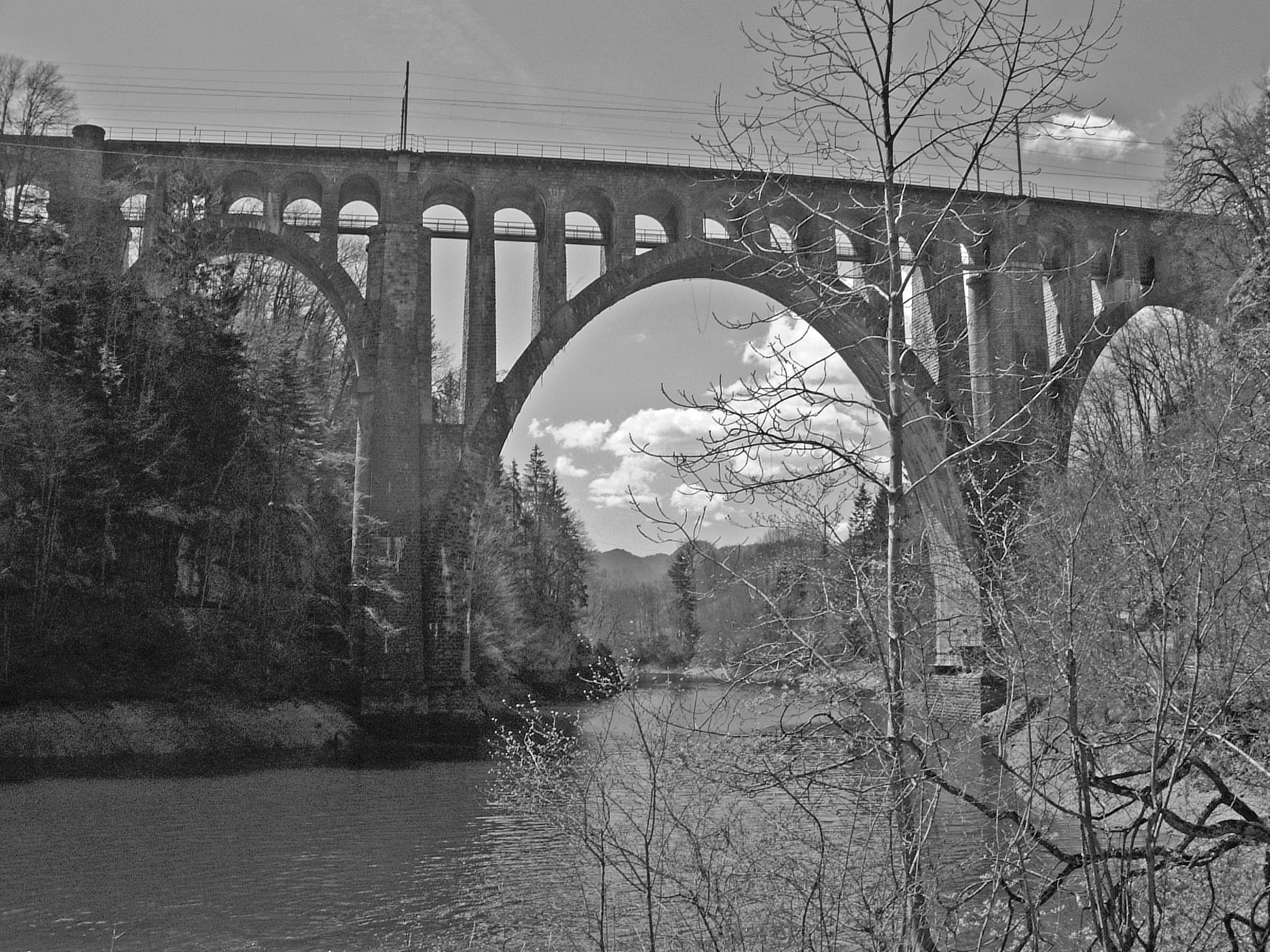
Le Day viaduct

The Le Day viaduct (viaduc du Day) is a railway viaduct in Vallorbe in the Jura-Nord vaudois District of the Swiss canton of Vaud. It stands near the hamlet of Le Day and crosses the Orbe. This has been dammed since 1955 by the Le Day dam (Le barrage du Day), which lies 450 m downstream.

The double-track bridge is used by TGV Lyria services between Paris and Lausanne on the Lausanne–Vallorbe line of the RER Vaud (Réseau express régional vaudois) and the line from Vallorbe to Le Pont in the Vallée de Joux with its extension to Le Brassus.

== Lattice truss bridge (1870) ==
The bridge opened by the Jougne-Eclépens Railway (Chemin de fer de Jougne à Eclépens, JE) in 1870 was a lattice truss construction of wrought iron originally supported by two stone masonry pillars. Their three uneven openings created spans of 36.5 + 56.0 + 23.5 m. It was 5.0 m wide and had a height of 59 m above the valley floor. Because of heavier locomotives and trains it was strengthened in 1899 and 1900.

In the 1920s, further strengthening was needed to enable electrification. Extensive research resulted in its reconstruction as a massive arch bridge as the cheapest solution.

== Reconstruction as a stone arch bridge (1925) ==
The viaduct of Le Day was therefore rebuilt from 1923 to 1925 before the Grandfey Viaduct near Fribourg without interruption to traffic. It was also provided with a pedestrian walkway. During the reconstruction project carried out by the SBB under the direction of Adolf Bühler, arches for the new bridge were first built into the existing openings below the iron superstructure, with the apexes of the arches reaching just below the lower girders of the lattice girders. The falsework was built by Richard Coray. Subsequently, the existing superstructure was carried by smaller supporting arches based on the pillars. Finally, sections of the iron structure were demolished and the new superstructure was built.

The bridge, which had a total length of 161.25 m, was given a main span with a clear width of 44.00 m. Nine supporting arches with a clear width of 4.50 m are carried by the main arch. The arches in the different-sized side openings naturally have smaller masses. The slightly overhanging superstructure now has a total width of 8.4 m. The arches are made of natural stone because concrete from the local gravel would not have had sufficient strength and the SBB wanted to avoid a contrast with the existing pillars. Only the parts of the pillars above the footbridge, the supporting arches and the remaining superstructure were built in stamped concrete and then covered with natural stone. The walkway on the longitudinal axis of the bridge was built of reinforced concrete. The two large pillars originally stood above the streambed. Their pedestals have been in the water since the construction of the Barrage du Day.
