= List of mayors of La Tour-de-Peilz =

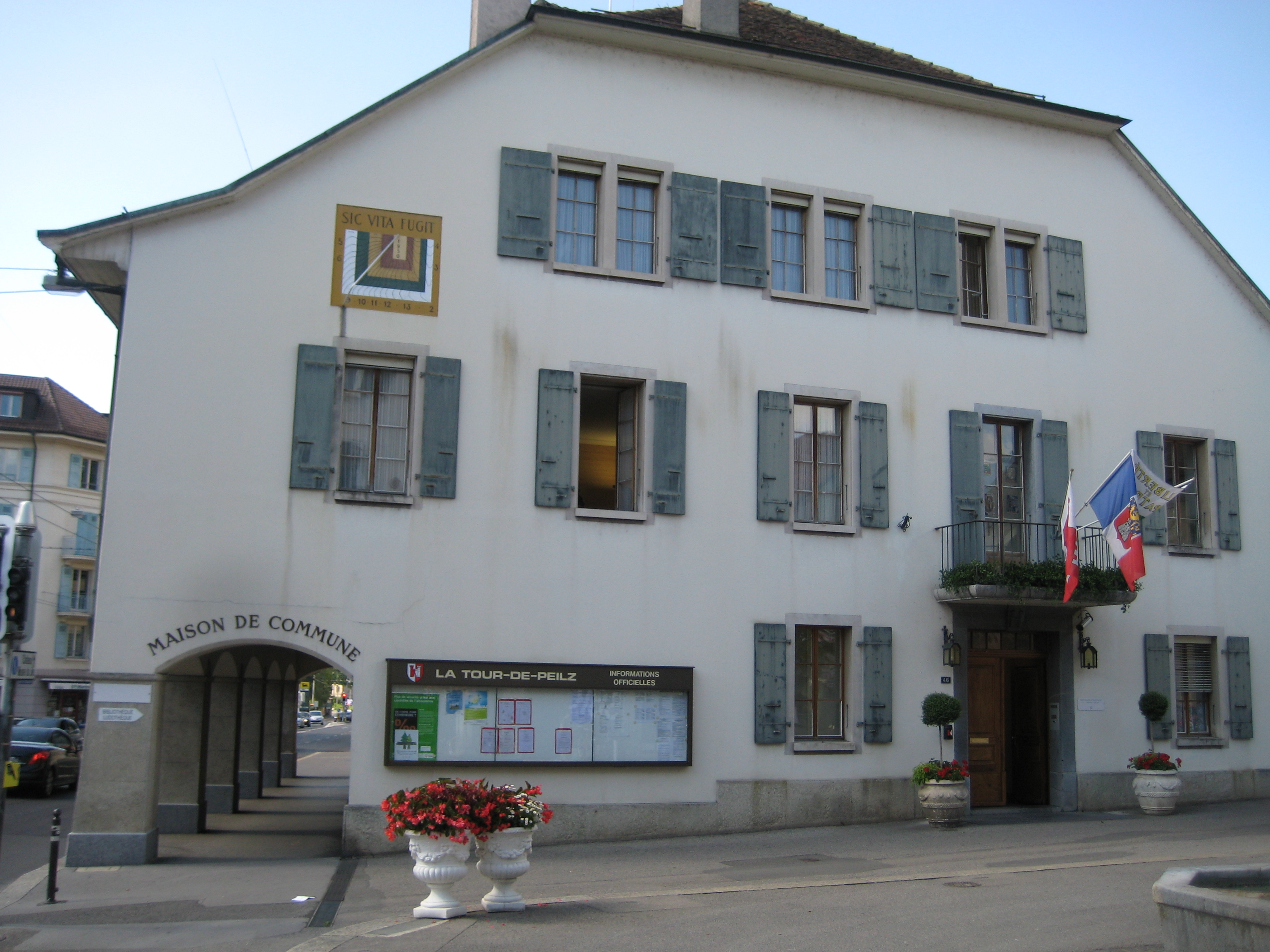
Maison de Commune, La Tour-de-Peilz

Coat of arms of La Tour-de-Peilz

This is a list of mayors (syndics) of La Tour-de-Peilz, a municipality in the canton of Vaud, Switzerland. The executive body, the Municipalité, is presided over by the mayor (syndic).

Mayors of La Tour-de-Peilz
| Period | Name | Lifespan | Party |
|---|---|---|---|
| 1914–1921 | Auguste Roussy | 1870–1940 | |
| 1921–1941 | Adolphe Burnat | 1872–1962 | |
| 1950s | Auguste Henry | | |
| 1960s | Pierre Hofmann | | |
| 1970s | André Debétaz | | |
| 1980s | Ferdinand Grognuz | | |
| 1990s | Emmanuella Blaser | born 1945 | UDC/SVP |
| –2005 | Alain Matthey | | |
| 2006–2011 | Nicole Rimella | born 1950 | PLS |
| 2011–2021 | Lyonel Kaufmann | born 1962 | PSS/SPS |
| 2021–2026 | Sandra Pasquier | | PSDG |
