= Simplon Railway =

Railway connecting Switzerland and Italy

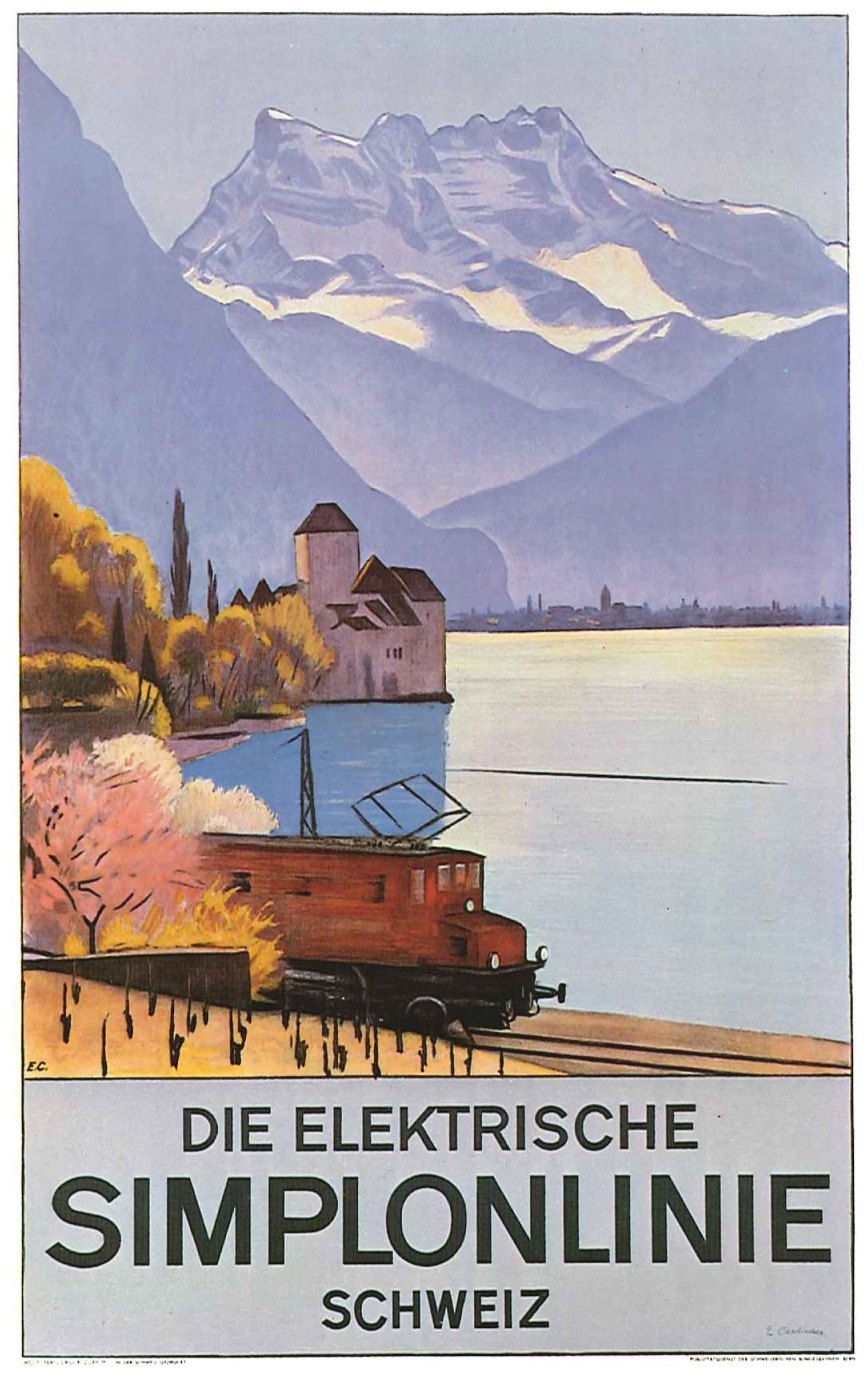
- 1928 poster, showing the line passing the Chateau du Chillon

Overview
- Native name: Simplonstrecke or Simplonlinie
- Termini: Vallorbe; Domodossola

Technical
- Line length: 232.5 km (144.5 mi)
- Number of tracks: 2
- Track gauge: 1,435 mm (4 ft 8 1/2 in) standard gauge
- Electrification: 15 kV/16.7 Hz AC overhead catenary
- Operating speed: Passenger: 160 km/h (100 mph); Passenger (2030): 200 km/h (125 mph); Freight: 140 km/h (87 mph)

The Simplon Railway is a line that links Lausanne in Switzerland and Domodossola in Italy, via Brig. The 20 km (12 mi)-long Simplon Tunnel (opened in 1906) is a major part of it. The line between Lausanne and Vallorbe is sometimes considered to form part of the line, making it 233 km (145 mi) long.

Together with the Lötschberg Railway to its north, it forms the second most important trans-Alpine railway line in Switzerland after the Gotthard Railway, which lies to its east and is about 240 km (150 mi) long.

ETCS level 2 is expected to be installed on the line between Lausanne and Brig before 2022.

== History ==
=== Vallorbe–Lausanne ===
The Cossonay–Bussigny-près-Lausanne section was opened in 1855 by the Compagnie de l'Ouest-Suisse (West Switzerland Company, OS) as part of the construction of the Jura Foot Railway. The Bussigny–Lausanne connecting curve was opened in 1856. The Jougne-Eclépens Railway started work on the Cossonay–Vallorbe section in 1870. A cross-border connection to the French rail network was opened in 1875 with the completion of the tunnel under the Col de Jougne. However, the trains from France to Switzerland had to make a zig zag turn until 1915, when the opening of the Mont d’Or Tunnel and the new line to Frasne created a direct route. The SNCF initially maintained the line to Pontarlier via the Tunnel de Jougne, but this suffered significant damage in the Second World War, including the blowing up of the Tunnel de Jougne by the French army, and it was not rebuilt.

=== Lausanne–Brig ===
The first section of the line went in operation on 10 June 1857 when the Compagnie de l'Ouest Suisse opened the Villeneuve–Bex section. The line was completed by the OS, the Compagnie de la Ligne d'Italie ("Company of the Italian line") and the Compagnie du chemin de fer du Simplon ("Simplon Railway Company") in subsequent stages, ending with the closing of the Leuk–Brig gap in 1878. The upgrade to two continuous tracks between Lausanne and Brig was completed in 2004.

The construction of the Lötschberg Railway was completed in 1913 and, in preparation, Brig was upgraded to be a junction station. After 1919, the Sion–Brig section was electrified at 3000 Volt 16 Hertz three phase, but between 1923 and 1927 the line was electrified throughout at the modern SBB standard single-phase 15 kV 16.7 Hz AC system.

With the opening of the Lötschberg Base Tunnel in 2007, Visp station became an interchange station between services from the Bern region to Zermatt and services towards Sion. Since then all trains to and from the Base Tunnel have run over the Simplon line between Visp and Domodossola.

=== Brig–Domodossola ===
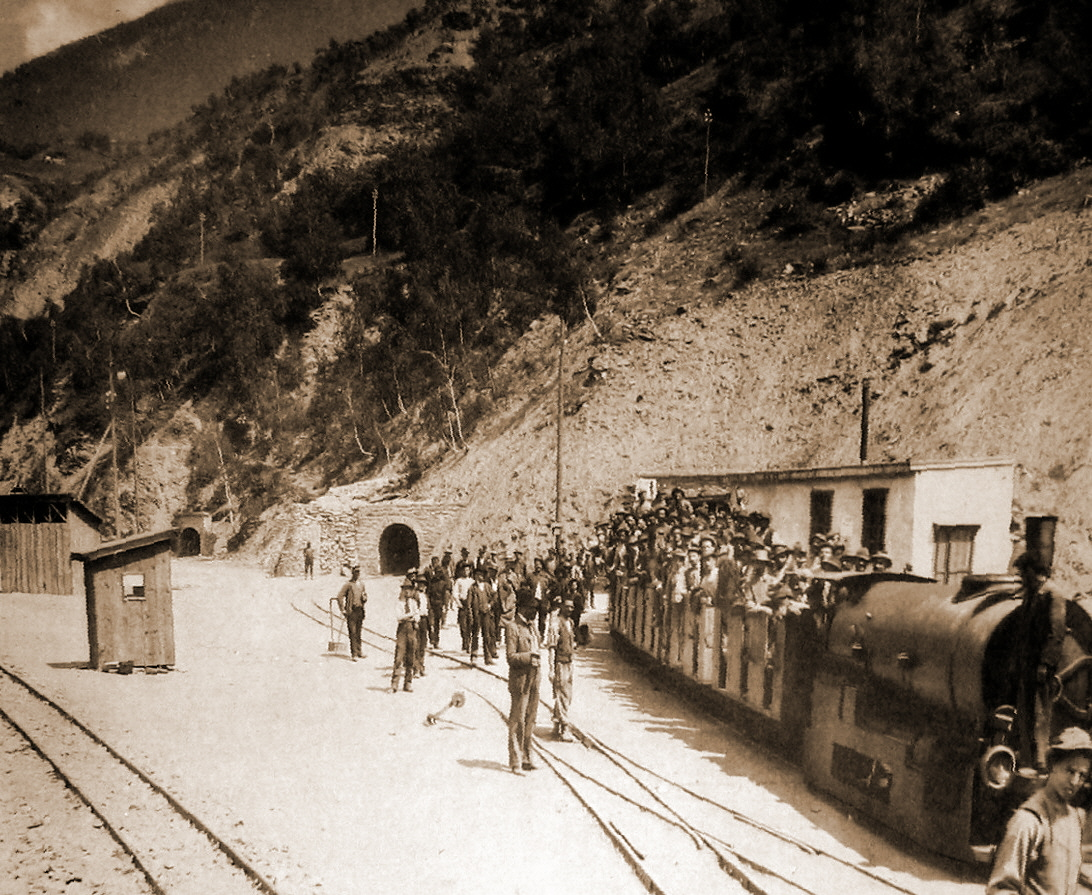
Construction of the Simplon tunnel

The first tube of the Simplon Tunnel was completed after eight years of construction and, along with the continuation of the line to Domodossola, it was opened in 1906. The connection to Domodossola included the Varzo elicoidale, which was probably the longest spiral tunnel in the world. The Simplon tunnel was electrified with 3000 Volt 16 Hertz three-phase AC power from the beginning of operations until 1930.

The second tube of the Simplon tunnel was built between 1912 and 1921 and opened to traffic in 1922.

In 1930, the route from Brig to Domodossola was electrified throughout with the standard Swiss system of 15 kV/16 2/3 Hz AC, which with its high voltage better suited the steep south ramp than the Italian 3,000 Volt DC system. The dispatcher at the nearby Italian south ramp (Iselle–Domodossola) has worked under Swiss regulations since the establishment of the SBB. Until the electrification in 1930, the 2.5 percent grade on the section was worked by steam, using a large number of C 5/6 locomotives that had been reallocated to the Brig depot after the electrification of the Gotthard Railway. The section, which is equipped with the Swiss train protection system belongs to Ferrovie dello Stato (FS), which also provides the ground personnel. Even in the 21st century, with open access, the majority of traffic on the Italian section is hauled by Swiss locomotives.

Since 1992, there has been a single-track link, electrified on the Swiss system, from Domodossola I station to the Domodossola II marshalling yard to provide access for Swiss locomotives. The marshalling yard mainly provides changes of traction for through freight trains.

== Operations ==
Since the closure of the Trans Europ Express service from Paris to Milan, only nightly passenger trains have run the full distance. These trains are operated by Trenitalia under the name of Thello and run on the Paris–Dijon–Milan–Venice route, which was also used by the former Venice-Simplon Orient Express. These services are operated with ETR 610 stock.

=== Long-distance services ===
Between Vallorbe and Lausanne long-distance TGV services run to/from Paris, which are extended in the winter season to Brig. Between Cossonay and Bussigny or Lausanne the route is still operated by ICN trains, which run over the Jura Foot Railway. Between Lausanne and Brig, InterRegio services run to and from Geneva Airport. Between Lausanne and Domodossola, EuroCity services run from Geneva to Milan or Venice. With the opening of the Lötschberg Base Tunnel in 2007, InterCity services running on the Romanshorn–Brig route and EuroCity services running on the Basel–Milan route use the section between the south portal in Visp and the north portal of the Simplon Tunnel in Brig.

=== Regional services ===
In the Rhone Valley Regional services run from Brig to Sion or Saint-Gingolph. In addition, five of the seven lines of the RéseauExpressVaudois run on sections of the Simplon railway between Lausanne and Renens. The S2 runs between Vallorbe and Lausanne, the S1 between Cossonay and Villeneuve, the S3 between Renens and Villeneuve, the S4 between Renens and Lausanne and the S11 between Cossonay and Lausanne.

=== Freight ===
Freight trains run on the line.

== List of Inter-City/Inter-Regional services ==
Station	French	German	Italian	Distance (km)	Lyria	IR90	EuroCity	IR (Lötschberger)
Vallorbe	Vallorbe	Vallorbe	Vallorbe	46.30	●			
Lausanne CFF	Lausanne	Lausanne	Losanna	0.00	●	●	●	
Vevey	Vevey	Vivis	Vevey	18.40	▲	●	｜	
Montreux	Montreux	Montreux	Montreux	24.54	▲	●	｜	
Aigle	Aigle	Älen	Aigle	39.31	▲	●	｜	
Saint-Maurice	Saint-Maurice	Sankt-Moritz	Saint-Maurice	51.56	▲	●	｜	
Martigny	Martigny	Martinach	Martigny	66.50	▲	●	｜	
Sion	Sion	Sitten	Seduno	92.43	▲	●	●	
Sierre/Siders	Sierre	Siders	Sierre	108.13	▲	●	｜	
Leuk	Loèche	Leuk	Leuk	117.58	▲	▲	｜	
Visp	Viège	Visp	Visp(a)	136.66	▲	●	｜	
Brig	Brigue	Brig	Brig(a)	145.55	▲	●	●	●
Domodossola	Domodossola	Domodossola	Domodossola	0.00			●	●

== Route ==
=== Vallorbe–Lausanne ===
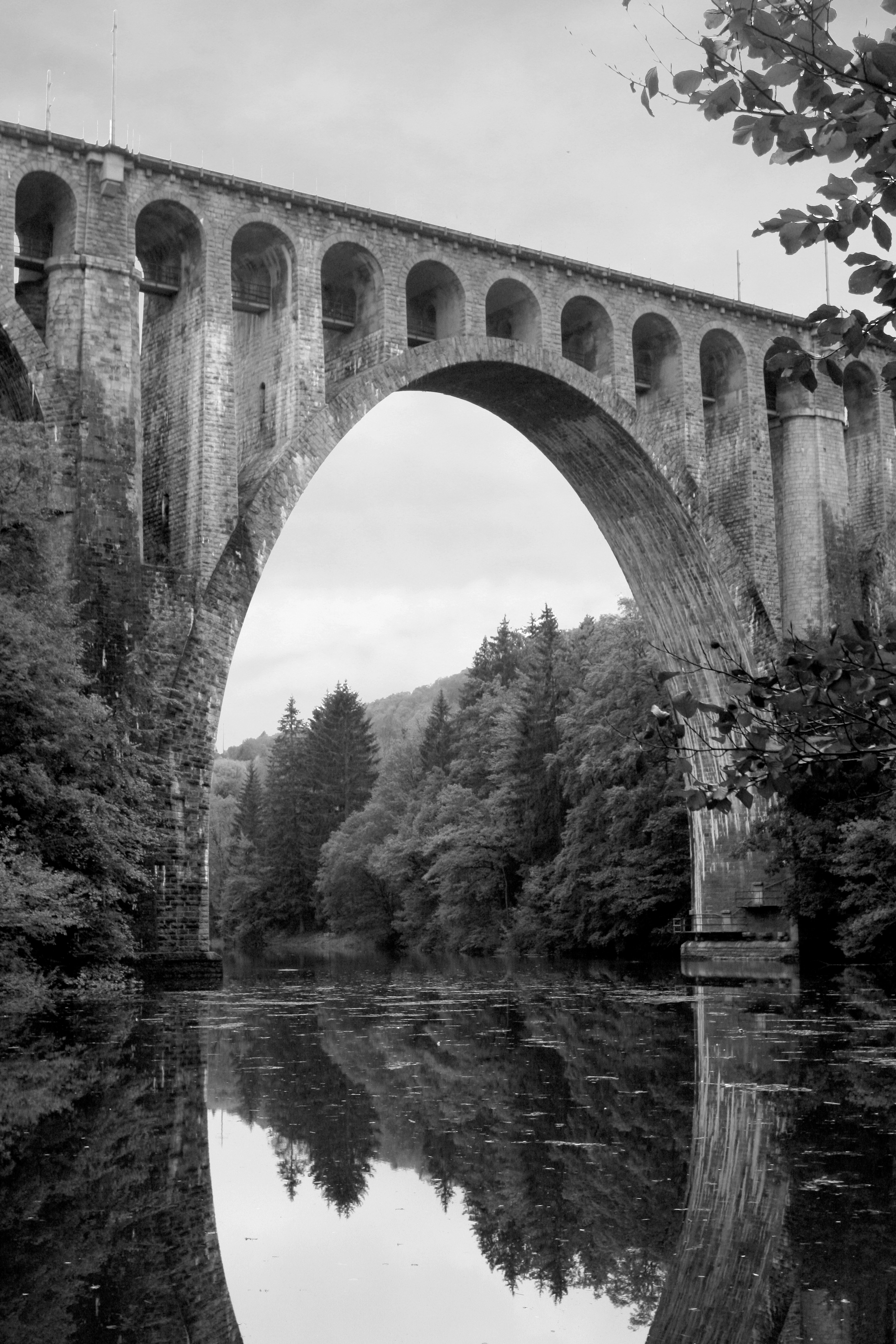
Le Day Viaduct

The line includes the section from the border station of Vallorbe to its northern connection to the RFF line from Dijon. After crossing the Le Day Viaduct, the line reaches the station of the village of Le Day. Immediately afterwards is the junction to the Vallorbe–Le Brassus railway line to Le Brassus. Between the stations of La Sarraz and Cossonay, the Jura Foot Railway from Olten connects with the line. The two routes run together to Bussigny, where there is connection to the line to Geneva at a wye junction. This allows trains running between the Jura Foot Railway and Geneva to avoid reversing at Lausanne. The line reaches Lausanne via Renens.

=== Lausanne–Brig ===
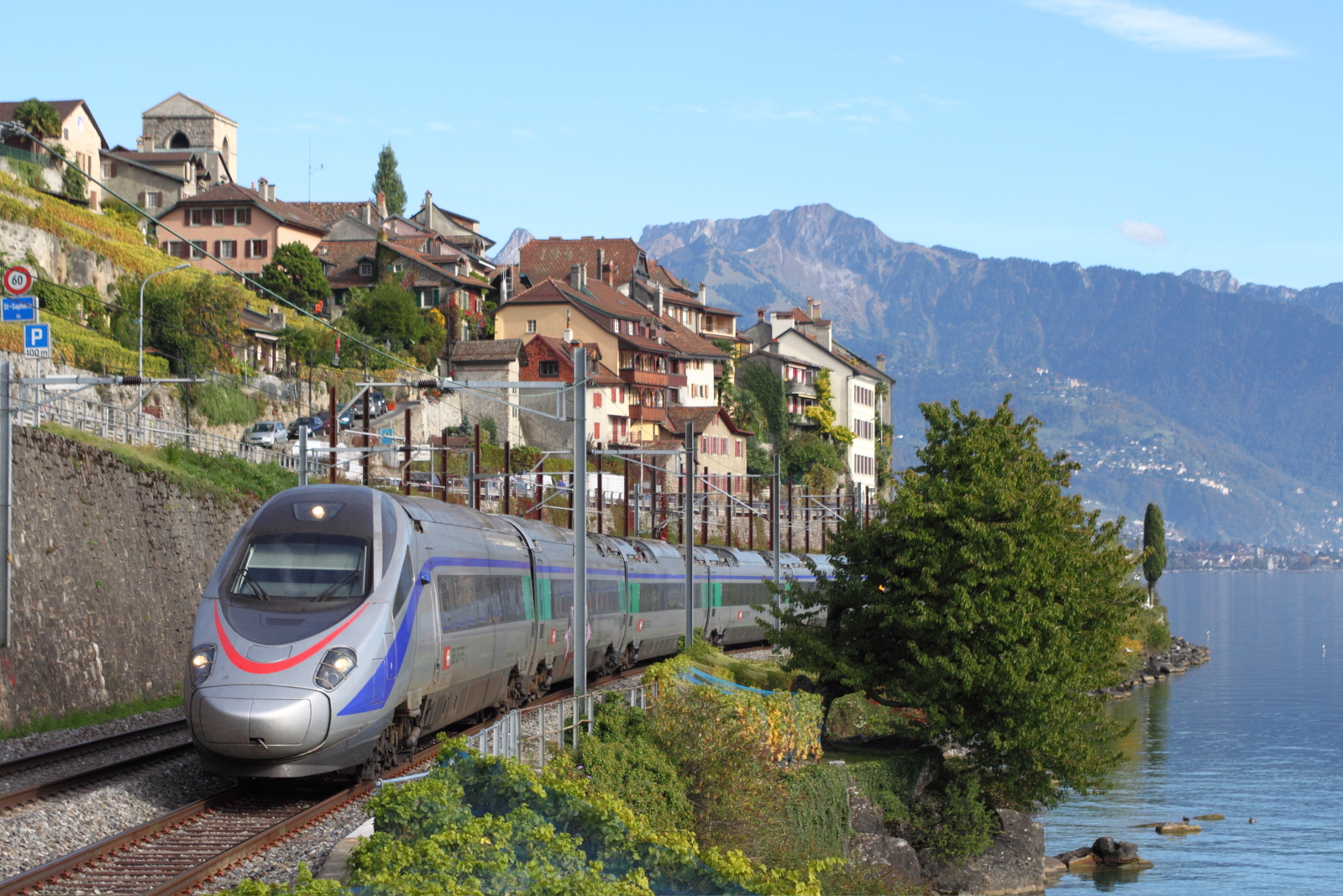
At St. Saphorin on Lake Geneva

After Lausanne station, the line to Fribourg and Bern branches off to the left in the middle of the SBB rolling stock depot, while the Simplon line remains on the shore of Lake Geneva. Some Lavaux communities have stations on both lines, such as Pully (Pully and Pully Nord) or Lutry (Lutry and La Conversion).

Vevey is reached via Pully, Lutry and Cully. The Vevey–Chexbres railway line, which ends here, is a one-track connection to the line to Bern and can also function as a bypass of Lausanne for the Simplon Railway, but it is rarely used as such. In addition, the narrow-gauge Vevey–Les Pléiades railway line runs from here to Les Pléiades.

The line reaches Montreux via La Tour-de-Peilz, Burier, and Clarens (which is within the Montreux municipal boundary); it is the only Swiss station with three different gauges. Here, the Montreux–Glion–Rochers-de-Naye railway line branches off to Rochers de Naye and the Montreux–Lenk im Simmental line to Lenk.

After Montreux, the line runs past Chillon Castle and the former Hôtel Byron to Villeneuve. Three narrow gauge lines branch off in Aigle to Leysin, Les Diablerets and Champéry. In Bex, the narrow-gauge Bex–Villars–Bretaye Railway runs to the Col-de-Bretaye. The line from Saint-Gingolph connects with the Simplon line in Saint-Maurice. The line then reaches Martigny, where two lines branch off. Both are operated by the TMR, the narrow gauge Martigny–Châtelard Railway towards Chamonix and a standard gauge line to Orsières with a branch to Le Châble. A few kilometres later, the line reaches Sion and shortly later Sierre, before reaching the language border between French and German. The first stop in the Upper Valais is Leuk. In Visp station there is a connection to the Matterhorn-Gotthard-Bahn (MGB) from Zermatt and the Lötschberg Base Tunnel connects with the line. The MGB runs from Brig, where the Lötschberg Mountain Railway connects with the Simplon line towards the Upper Valais.

=== Brig–Domodossola ===
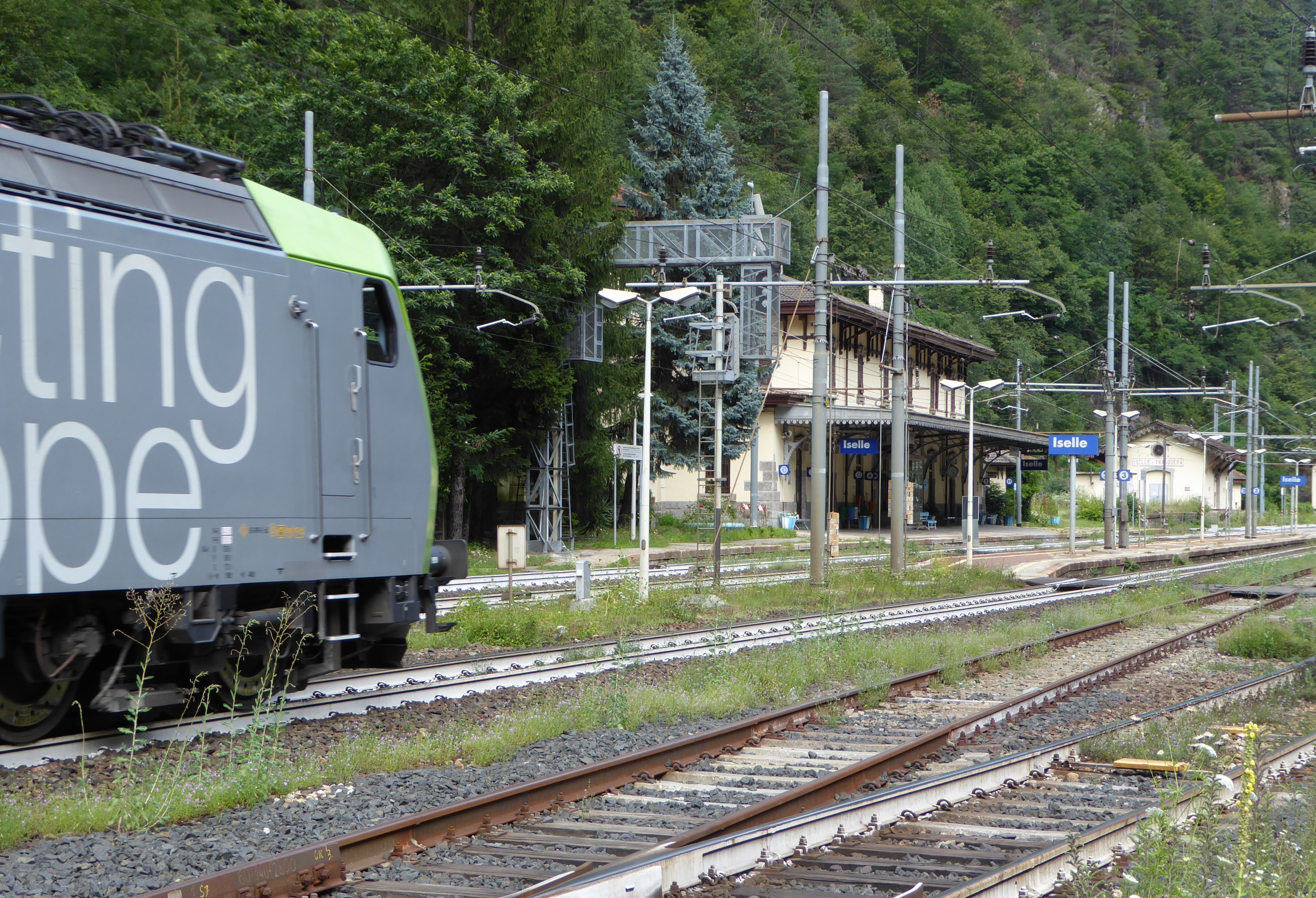
Although the line crosses from the property of the SBB to that of the Ferrovie dello Stato in Iselle, Domodossola is electrified with the Swiss electrical system and uses Swiss operating rules. The ground staff, however, are provided by FS. BLS class Re 485 locomotive passing through Iselle.

After Brig, the line runs into the Simplon Tunnel, in the middle of which is the national border between Switzerland and Italy. The tunnel ends at Iselle di Trasquera where, as in Brig, there is a terminal for the carriage of cars through the tunnel. This is followed by the 1.7 km-long Trasquera Tunnel and the 3.0 km-long Varzo Spiral Tunnel. The line reaches Domodossola via the halts of Varzo and Preglia. The catenary of the section on Italian territory is built to the Italian overhead line standards—but it is charged at 15 kV / 16.7 Hz AC. The signals comply with SBB standards. The trains continue from Domodossola over the Domodossola–Milan railway, which is owned by the Italian infrastructure company RFI.
