= Tramelan-Chalet railway station =

Railway station in Tramelan, Switzerland

Tramelan-Chalet
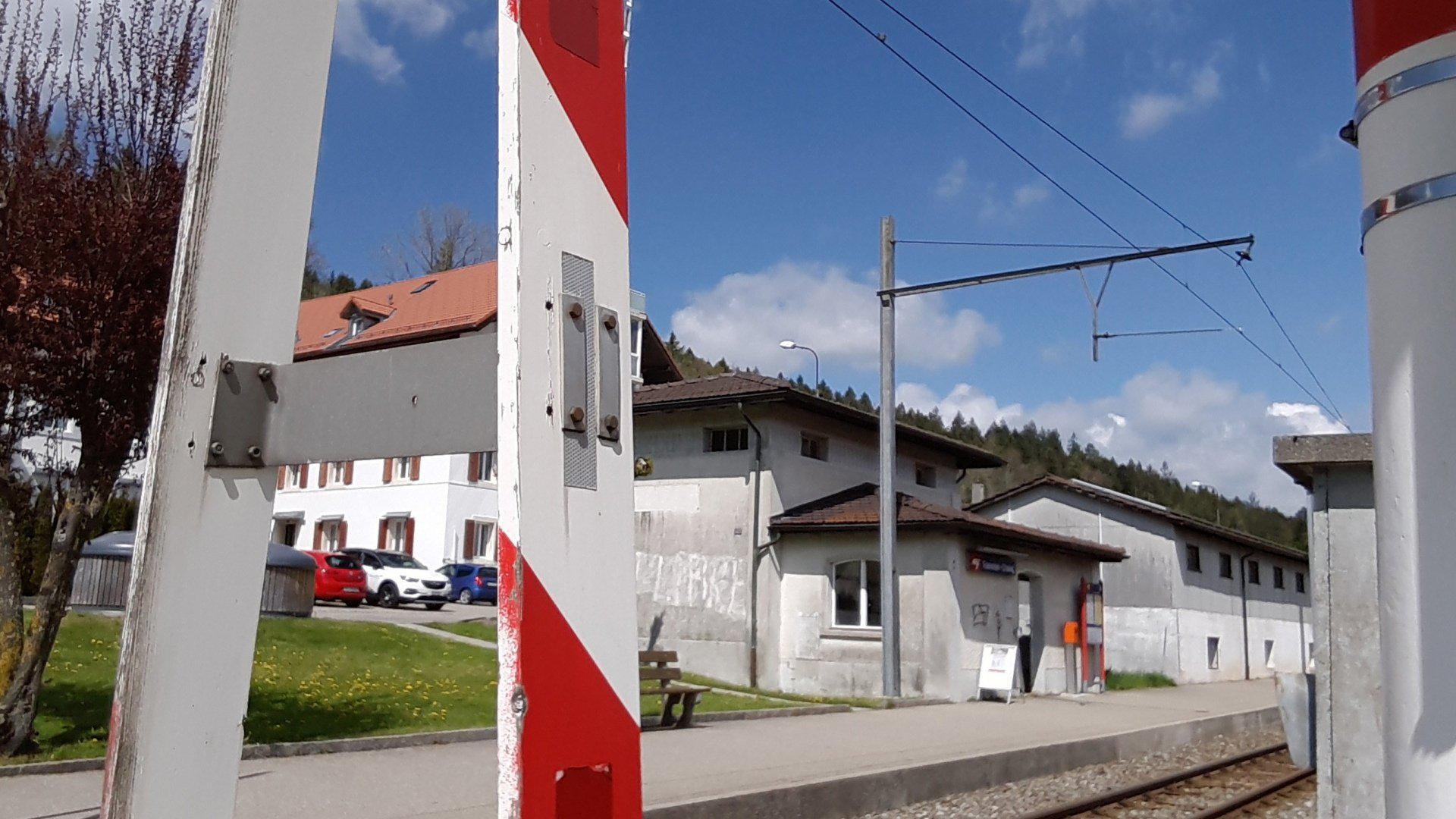
- The station in 2019

General information
- Location: Tramelan, Bern; Switzerland
- Coordinates: 47°13′23″N 7°05′31″E
- Elevation: 959 m (3,146 ft)
- Owner: Chemins de fer du Jura
- Line: Tavannes–Noirmont
- Distance: 10.3 km (6.4 mi) from Tavannes
- Platforms: 1 side platform
- Tracks: 1
- Train operators: Chemins de fer du Jura
- Connections: CarPostal SA bus lines; CJ bus line

Construction
- Accessible: Yes

Other information
- Station code: 8500164 (TRCH)
- Fare zone: 41 (Vagabond); 351 (Libero)

Services
| Preceding station | Chemins de fer du Jura | Following station |
|---|---|---|
| Les Reussilles towards Le Noirmont | R37 | Tramelan towards Tavannes |
Location

Tramelan-Chalet railway station (French: Gare de Tramelan-Chalet) is a railway station in the municipality of Tramelan, in the Swiss canton of Bern. It is an intermediate stop and a request stop on the 1,000 mm (3 ft 3 3/8 in) metre gauge Tavannes–Noirmont railway line of Chemins de fer du Jura.

== Services ==
As of the December 2023 timetable change, the following services stop at Tramelan-Chalet:

- Regio: hourly service between Le Noirmont and Tavannes. Connections are made in Le Noirmont for La Chaux-de-Fonds and Saignelégier, and in Tavannes for Sonceboz-Sombeval, Biel/Bienne, and Moutier.
