= Les Reussilles railway station =

Railway station in Tramelan, Switzerland

Les Reussilles
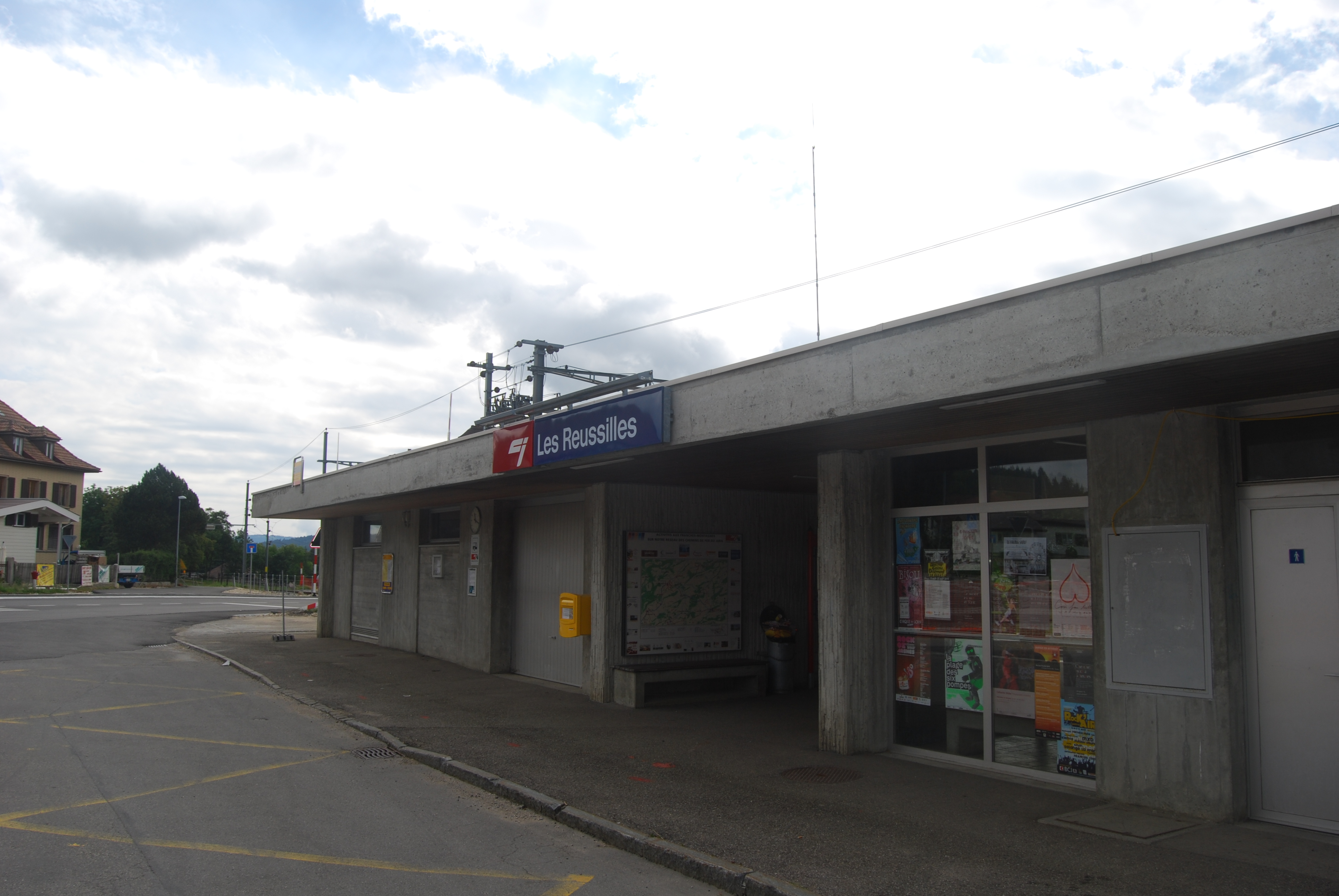
- The station building in 2010

General information
- Location: Tramelan, Bern; Switzerland
- Coordinates: 47°13′26″N 7°04′59″E
- Elevation: 1,011 m (3,317 ft)
- Owner: Chemins de fer du Jura
- Line: Tavannes–Noirmont
- Distance: 11.5 km (7.1 mi) from Tavannes
- Platforms: 2 (1 island platform)
- Tracks: 2
- Train operators: Chemins de fer du Jura
- Connections: CarPostal SA bus lines; CJ bus line

Construction
- Accessible: Yes

Other information
- Station code: 8500171 (REUS)
- Fare zone: 41 (Vagabond); 351 (Libero)

Services
Preceding station	Chemins de fer du Jura	Following station
Le Pied-d'Or towards Le Noirmont	R37	Tramelan-Chalet towards Tavannes
Location

Les Reussilles railway station (French: Gare de Les Reussilles) is a railway station in the municipality of Tramelan, in the Swiss canton of Bern. It is an intermediate stop and a request stop on the 1,000 mm (3 ft 3 3/8 in) metre gauge Tavannes–Noirmont railway line of Chemins de fer du Jura.

== Services ==
As of the December 2023 timetable change, the following services stop at Les Reussilles:

- Regio: hourly service between Le Noirmont and Tavannes. Connections are made in Le Noirmont for La Chaux-de-Fonds and Saignelégier, and in Tavannes for Sonceboz-Sombeval, Biel/Bienne, and Moutier.
