= La Chaux-des-Breuleux railway station =

Railway station in La Chaux-des-Breuleux, Switzerland

La Chaux-des-Breuleux
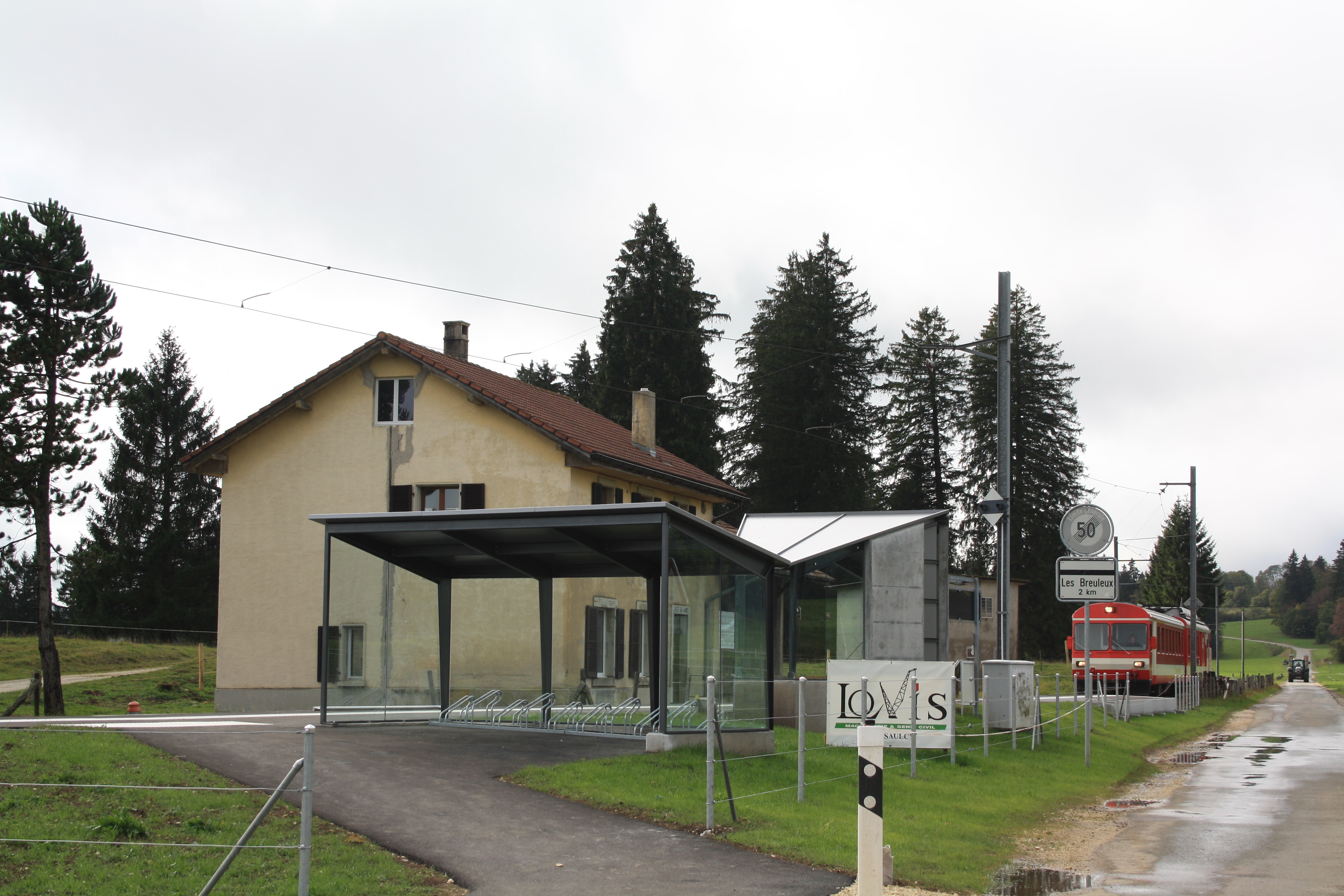
- A train arrives at the station in 2011

General information
- Location: La Chaux-des-Breuleux, Jura; Switzerland
- Coordinates: 47°13′12″N 7°01′30″E
- Elevation: 1,006 m (3,301 ft)
- Owner: Chemins de fer du Jura
- Line: Tavannes–Noirmont
- Distance: 16.0 km (9.9 mi) from Tavannes
- Platforms: 1 side platform
- Tracks: 1
- Train operators: Chemins de fer du Jura

Other information
- Station code: 8500172 (CHXB)
- Fare zone: 41 (Vagabond); 42 (Onde Verte and Vagabond)

Services
Preceding station	Chemins de fer du Jura	Following station
Les Breuleux towards Le Noirmont	R37	Le Pied-d'Or towards Tavannes
Location
- Location within Switzerland Location within Canton of Jura

La Chaux-des-Breuleux railway station (French: Gare de La Chaux-des-Breuleux) is a railway station in the municipality of La Chaux-des-Breuleux, in the Swiss canton of Jura. It is an intermediate stop and a request stop on the 1,000 mm (3 ft 3 3/8 in) metre gauge Tavannes–Noirmont railway line of Chemins de fer du Jura.

== Services ==
As of the December 2023 timetable change, the following services stop at La Chaux-des-Breuleux:

- Regio: hourly service between Le Noirmont and Tavannes. Connections are made in Le Noirmont for La Chaux-de-Fonds and Saignelégier, and in Tavannes for Sonceboz-Sombeval, Biel/Bienne, and Moutier.
