= Le Pied-d'Or railway station =

Railway station in Tramelan, Switzerland

Le Pied-d'Or
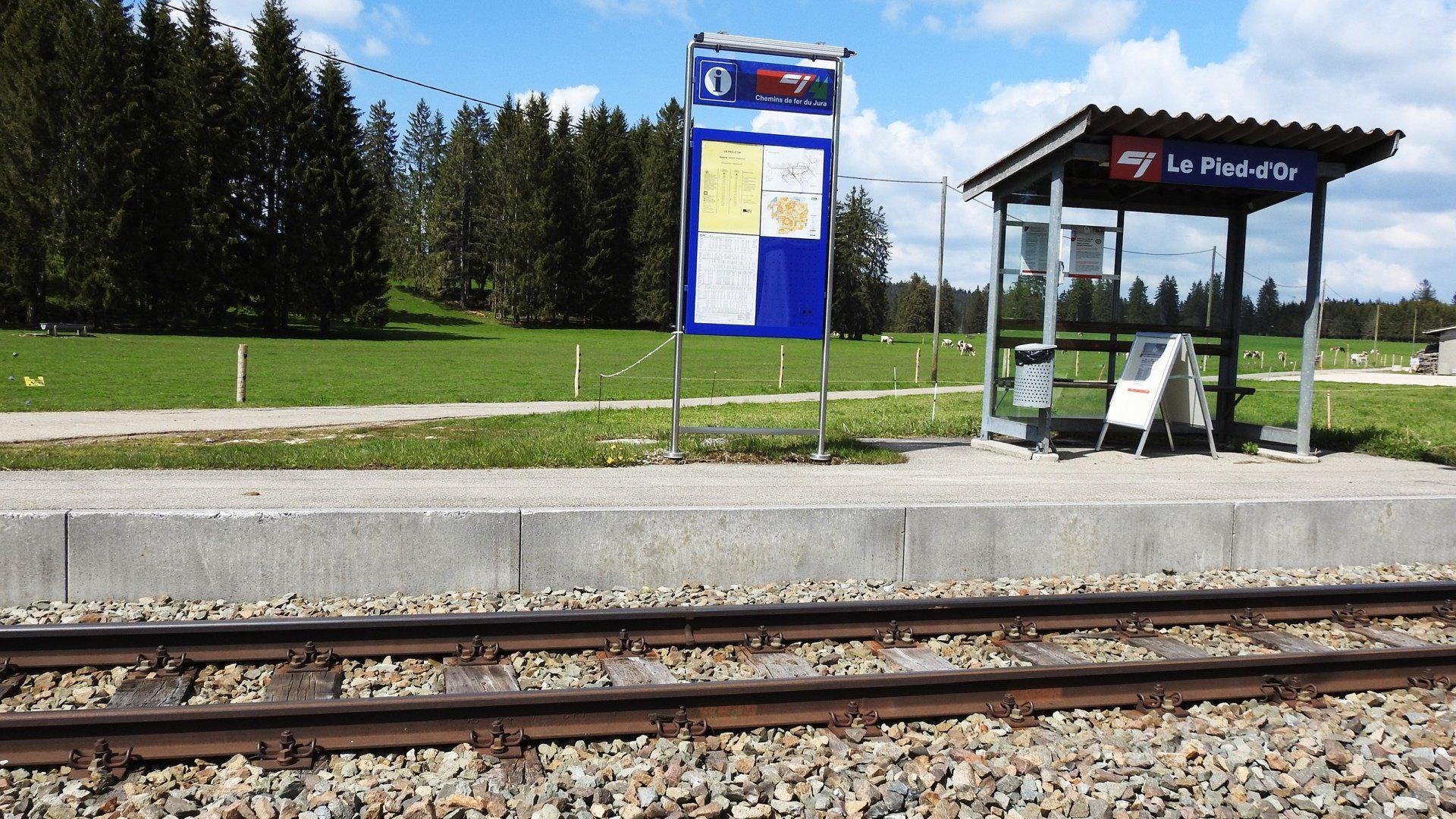
- The station in 2019

General information
- Location: Tramelan, Bern; Switzerland
- Coordinates: 47°13′19″N 7°03′22″E
- Elevation: 1,005 m (3,297 ft)
- Owner: Chemins de fer du Jura
- Line: Tavannes–Noirmont
- Distance: 13.6 km (8.5 mi) from Tavannes
- Platforms: 1 side platform
- Tracks: 1
- Train operators: Chemins de fer du Jura

Construction
- Accessible: No

Other information
- Station code: 8500165 (PIEO)
- Fare zone: 41 (Vagabond); 351 (Libero)

Services
Preceding station	Chemins de fer du Jura	Following station
La Chaux-des-Breuleux towards Le Noirmont	R37	Les Reussilles towards Tavannes
Location

Le Pied-d'Or railway station (French: Gare de Le Pied-d'Or) is a railway station in the municipality of Tramelan, in the Swiss canton of Bern. It is an intermediate stop and a request stop on the 1,000 mm (3 ft 3 3/8 in) metre gauge Tavannes–Noirmont railway line of Chemins de fer du Jura.

== Services ==
As of the December 2023 timetable change, the following services stop at Le Pied-d'Or:

- Regio: hourly service between Le Noirmont and Tavannes. Connections are made in Le Noirmont for La Chaux-de-Fonds and Saignelégier, and in Tavannes for Sonceboz-Sombeval, Biel/Bienne, and Moutier.
