= Les Breuleux railway station =

Railway station in Les Breuleux, Switzerland

Les Breuleux
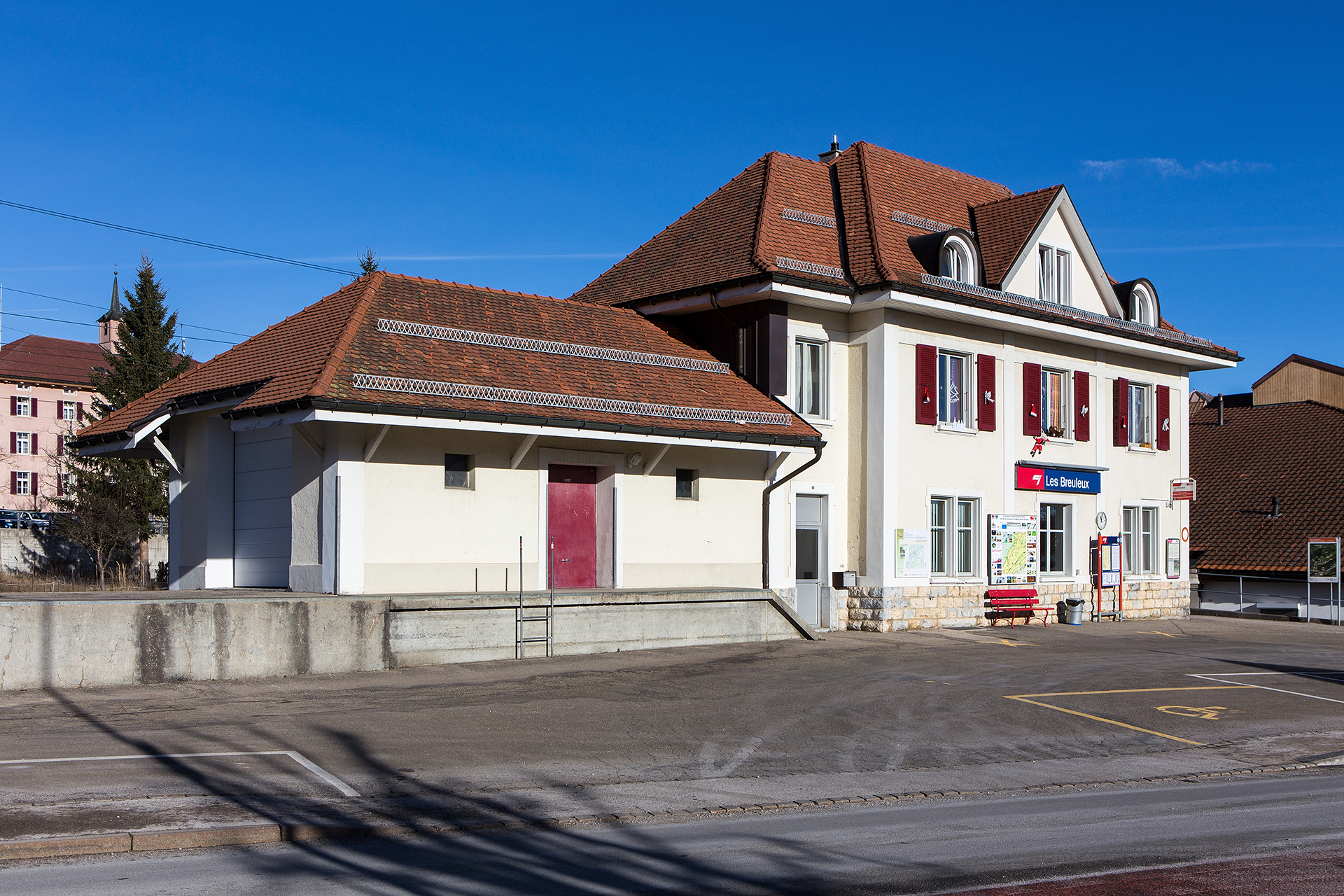
- The station building in 2016

General information
- Location: Les Breuleux, Jura; Switzerland
- Coordinates: 47°12′36″N 7°00′18″E
- Elevation: 1,020 m (3,350 ft)
- Owner: Chemins de fer du Jura
- Line: Tavannes–Noirmont
- Distance: 17.9 km (11.1 mi) from Tavannes
- Platforms: 2 (1 island platform)
- Tracks: 3
- Train operators: Chemins de fer du Jura
- Connections: CJ 131

Other information
- Station code: 8500173 (BREU)
- Fare zone: 41 (Vagabond); 42 (Onde Verte and Vagabond)

Services
Preceding station	Chemins de fer du Jura	Following station
Les Breuleux-Eglise towards Le Noirmont	R37	La Chaux-des-Breuleux towards Tavannes
Location
- Location within Switzerland Location within Canton of Jura

Les Breuleux railway station (French: Gare des Breuleux) is a railway station in the municipality of Les Breuleux, in the Swiss canton of Jura. It is an intermediate stop and a request stop on the 1,000 mm (3 ft 3 3/8 in) metre gauge Tavannes–Noirmont railway line of Chemins de fer du Jura. It is one of the two stations in the municipality: the other, Les Breuleux-Eglise, is 0.7 kilometres (0.43 mi) up the line.

== Services ==
As of the December 2023 timetable change, the following services stop at Les Breuleux:

- Regio: hourly service between Le Noirmont and Tavannes. Connections are made in Le Noirmont for La Chaux-de-Fonds and Saignelégier, and in Tavannes for Sonceboz-Sombeval, Biel/Bienne, and Moutier.
