= Le Bémont railway station =

Railway station in Le Bémont, Switzerland

Le Bémont JU
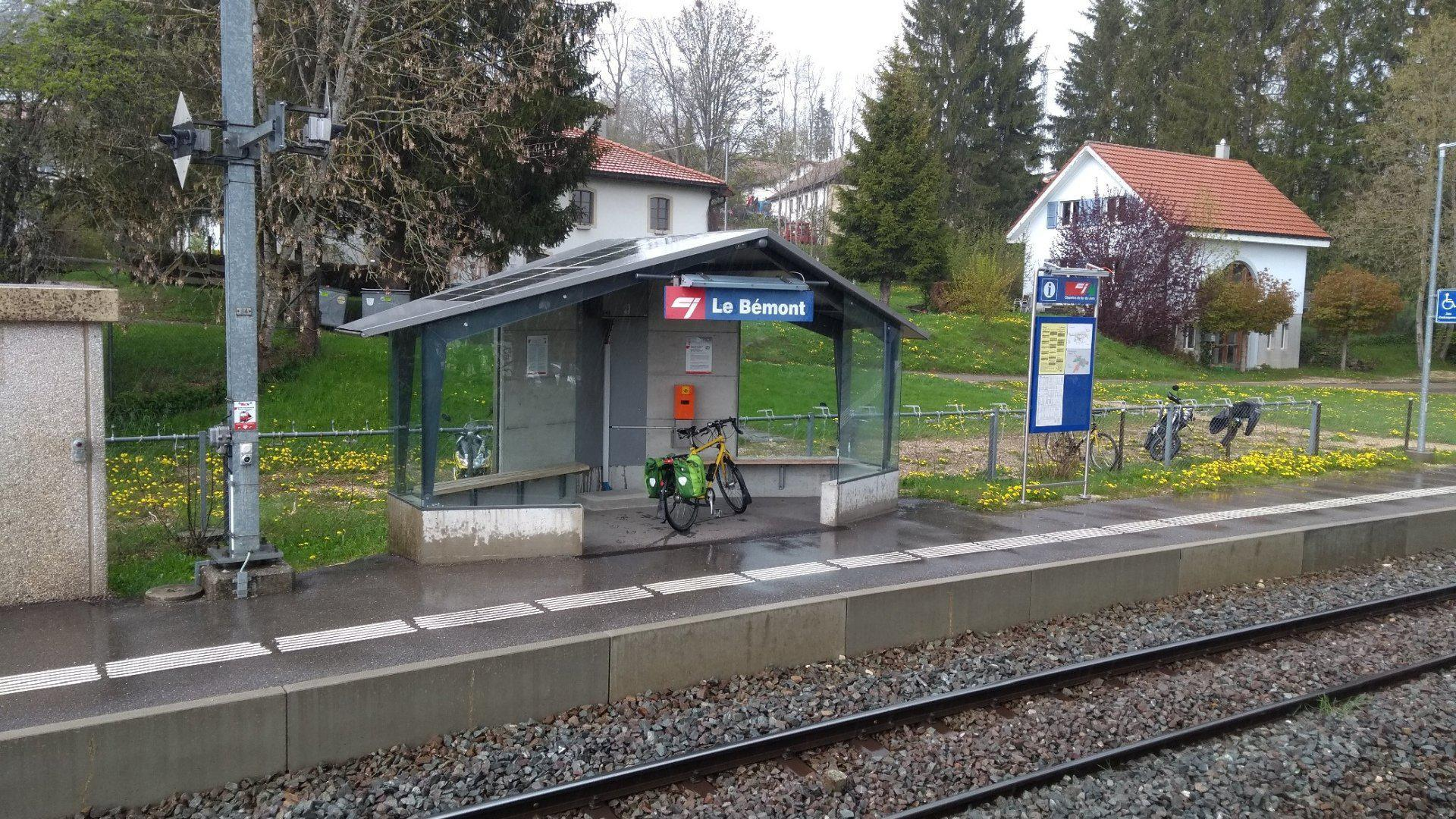
- The station platform in 2019

General information
- Location: Le Bémont, Jura; Switzerland
- Coordinates: 47°15′47″N 7°00′50″E
- Elevation: 970 m (3,180 ft)
- Owner: Chemins de fer du Jura
- Line: La Chaux-de-Fonds–Glovelier line
- Distance: 7.2 km (4.5 mi) from Le Noirmont
- Platforms: 1 side platform
- Tracks: 1
- Train operators: Chemins de fer du Jura

Construction
- Accessible: No

Other information
- Station code: 8500192 (BEM)
- Fare zone: 41 (Vagabond)

Services
Preceding station	Chemins de fer du Jura	Following station
Saignelégier towards La Chaux-de-Fonds	R36	Pré-Petitjean towards Glovelier
Location
- Location within Switzerland Location within Canton of Jura

Le Bémont JU railway station (French: Gare du Bémont) is a railway station in the municipality of Le Bémont, in the Swiss canton of Jura. It is an intermediate stop and a request stop on the 1,000 mm (3 ft 3 3/8 in) metre gauge La Chaux-de-Fonds–Glovelier line of the Chemins de fer du Jura.

== Services ==
As of the December 2023 timetable change, the following services stop at Le Bémont JU:

- Regio: hourly service between La Chaux-de-Fonds and Glovelier.
