= Pré-Petitjean railway station =

Railway station in Montfaucon, Switzerland

Pré-Petitjean
- The station building in 2018

General information
- Location: Montfaucon, Jura; Switzerland
- Coordinates: 47°16′38″N 7°03′32″E
- Elevation: 928 m (3,045 ft)
- Owner: Chemins de fer du Jura
- Line: La Chaux-de-Fonds–Glovelier line
- Distance: 10.9 km (6.8 mi) from Le Noirmont
- Platforms: 2 (1 island platform)
- Tracks: 2
- Train operators: Chemins de fer du Jura

Construction
- Accessible: Yes

Other information
- Station code: 8500194 (PREP)
- Fare zone: 41 (Vagabond)

Services
Preceding station	Chemins de fer du Jura	Following station
Le Bémont towards La Chaux-de-Fonds	R36	La Combe towards Glovelier
Location
- Location within Switzerland Location within Canton of Jura

Pré-Petitjean railway station (French: Gare de Pré-Petitjean) is a railway station in the municipality of Montfaucon, in the Swiss canton of Jura. It is an intermediate stop and a request stop on the 1,000 mm (3 ft 3 3/8 in) metre gauge La Chaux-de-Fonds–Glovelier line of the Chemins de fer du Jura. The depot of the La Traction railway preservation group is located just east of the station.

== Services ==
As of the December 2023 timetable change, the following services stop at Pré-Petitjean:

- Regio: hourly service between La Chaux-de-Fonds and Glovelier.
