= Le Creux-des-Biches railway station =

Railway station in Le Noirmont, Switzerland

Le Creux-des-Biches
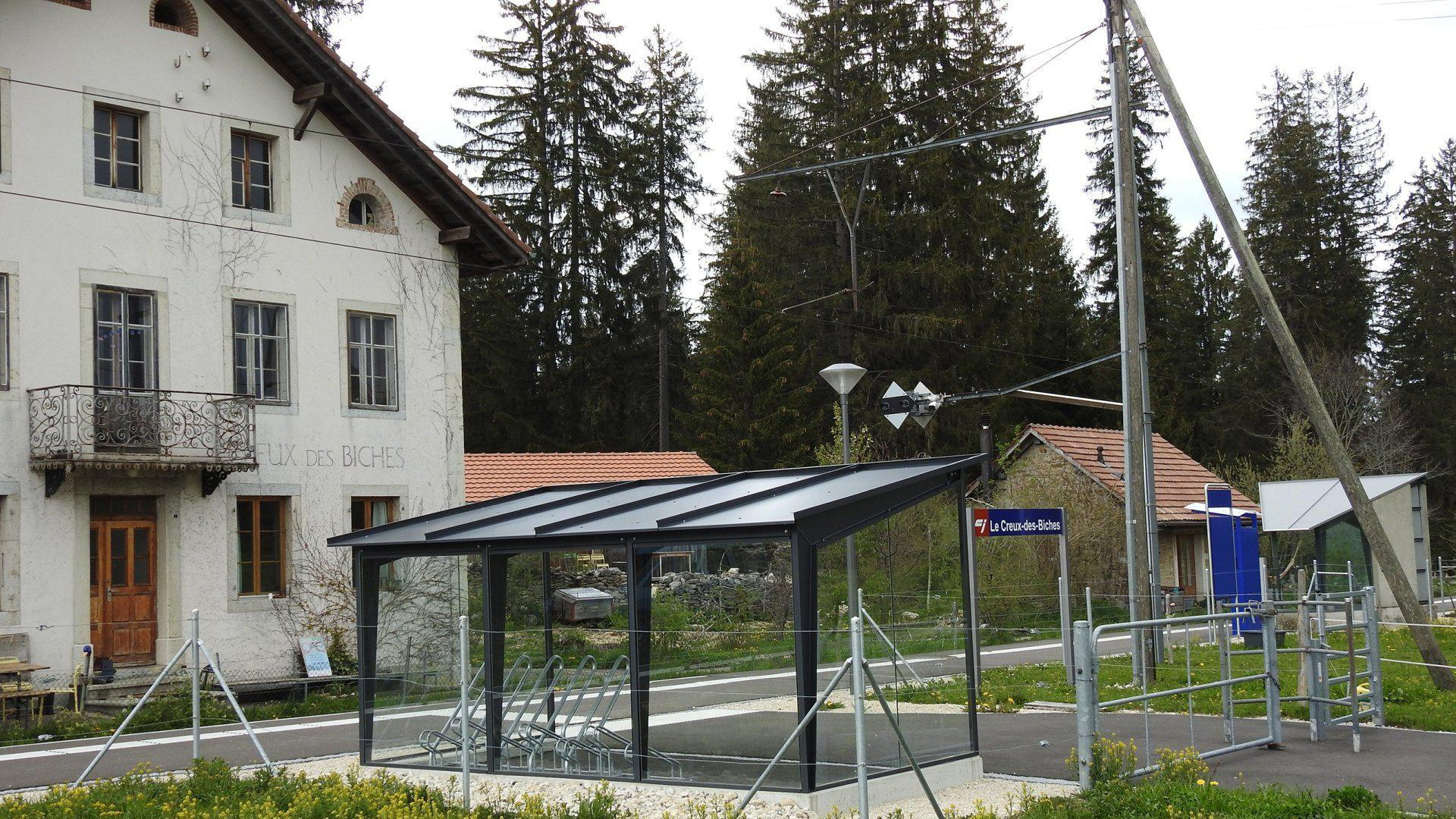
- The station platform in 2019

General information
- Location: Le Noirmont, Jura; Switzerland
- Coordinates: 47°12′11″N 6°56′28″E
- Elevation: 1,012 m (3,320 ft)
- Owner: Chemins de fer du Jura
- Line: La Chaux-de-Fonds–Glovelier line
- Distance: 26.0 km (16.2 mi) from Tavannes
- Platforms: 1 side platform
- Tracks: 1
- Train operators: Chemins de fer du Jura

Construction
- Accessible: Yes

Other information
- Station code: 8500175 (CREB)
- Fare zone: 42 (Onde Verte and Vagabond)

Services
| Preceding station | Chemins de fer du Jura | Following station |
|---|---|---|
| Le Boéchet towards La Chaux-de-Fonds | R36 | Le Noirmont towards Glovelier |
Location
- Location within Switzerland Location within Canton of Jura

Le Creux-des-Biches railway station (French: Gare du Creux-des-Biches) is a railway station in the municipality of Le Noirmont, in the Swiss canton of Jura. It is an intermediate stop and a request stop on the 1,000 mm (3 ft 3 3/8 in) metre gauge La Chaux-de-Fonds–Glovelier line of the Chemins de fer du Jura.

== Services ==
As of the December 2023 timetable change, the following services stop at Le Creux-des-Biches:

- Regio: hourly service between La Chaux-de-Fonds and Glovelier.
