= Tramelan railway station =

Railway station in Tramelan, Switzerland

Tramelan
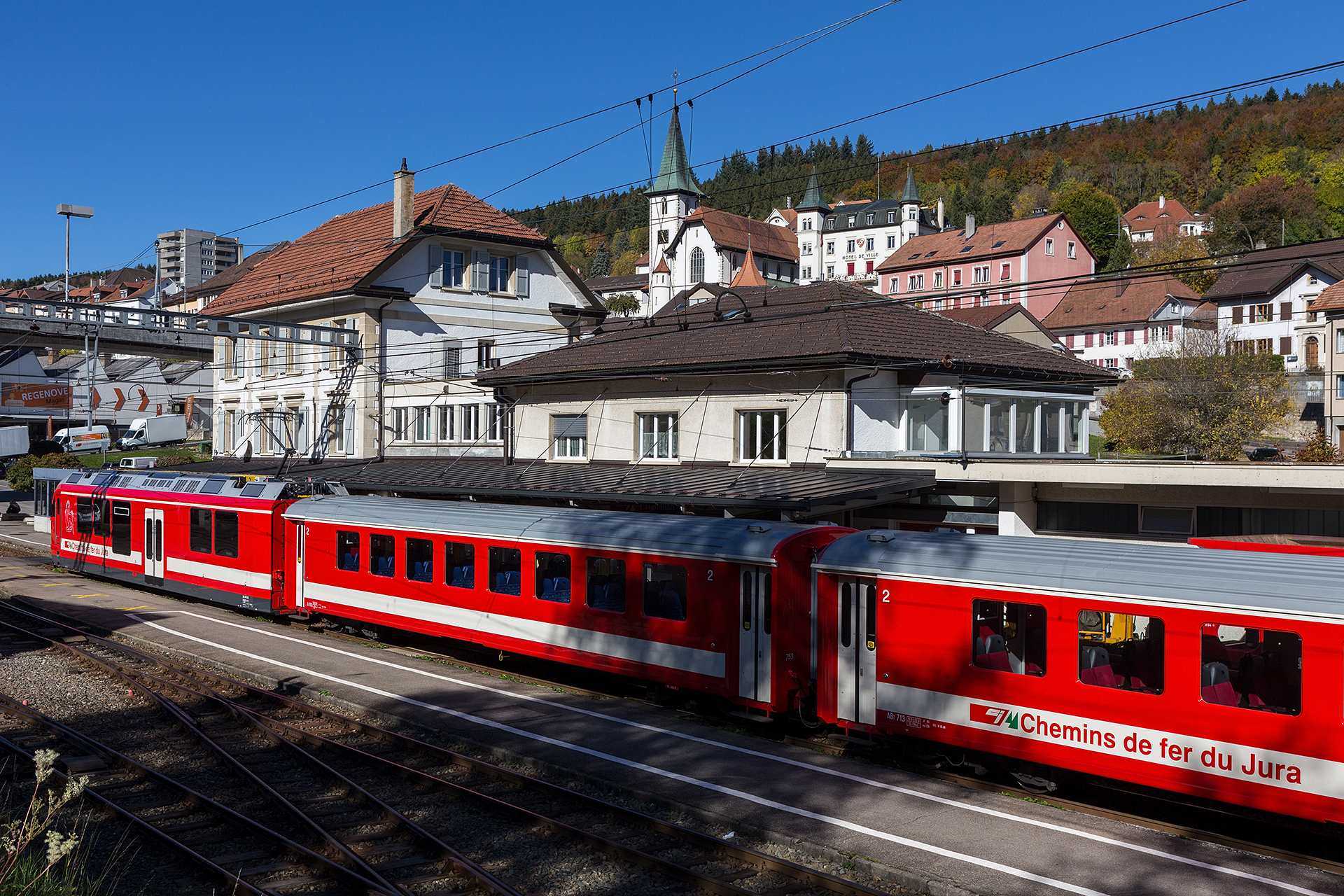
- The station in 2017

General information
- Location: Tramelan, Bern; Switzerland
- Coordinates: 47°13′23″N 7°06′22″E
- Elevation: 888 m (2,913 ft)
- Owner: Chemins de fer du Jura
- Line: Tavannes–Noirmont
- Distance: 8.7 km (5.4 mi) from Tavannes
- Platforms: 2; 1 side platform; 1 island platform
- Tracks: 2
- Train operators: Chemins de fer du Jura
- Connections: CarPostal SA bus lines; CJ bus line

Construction
- Accessible: No

Other information
- Station code: 8500170 (TRAM)
- Fare zone: 41 (Vagabond); 351 (Libero)

Services
Preceding station	Chemins de fer du Jura	Following station
Tramelan-Chalet towards Le Noirmont	R37	Tramelan-Dessous towards Tavannes
Location

Tramelan railway station (French: Gare de Tramelan) is a railway station in the municipality of Tramelan, in the Swiss canton of Bern. It is an intermediate stop on the 1,000 mm (3 ft 3 3/8 in) metre gauge Tavannes–Noirmont railway line of Chemins de fer du Jura.

== Services ==
As of the December 2023 timetable change, the following services stop at Tramelan:

- Regio: hourly service (half-hourly on weekdays) to Tavannes, hourly service to Le Noirmont. Connections are made in Le Noirmont for La Chaux-de-Fonds and Saignelégier, and in Tavannes for Sonceboz-Sombeval, Biel/Bienne, and Moutier.
