= La Chaux-de-Fonds-Est railway station =

Railway station in La Chaux-de-Fonds, Switzerland

La Chaux-de-Fonds-Est
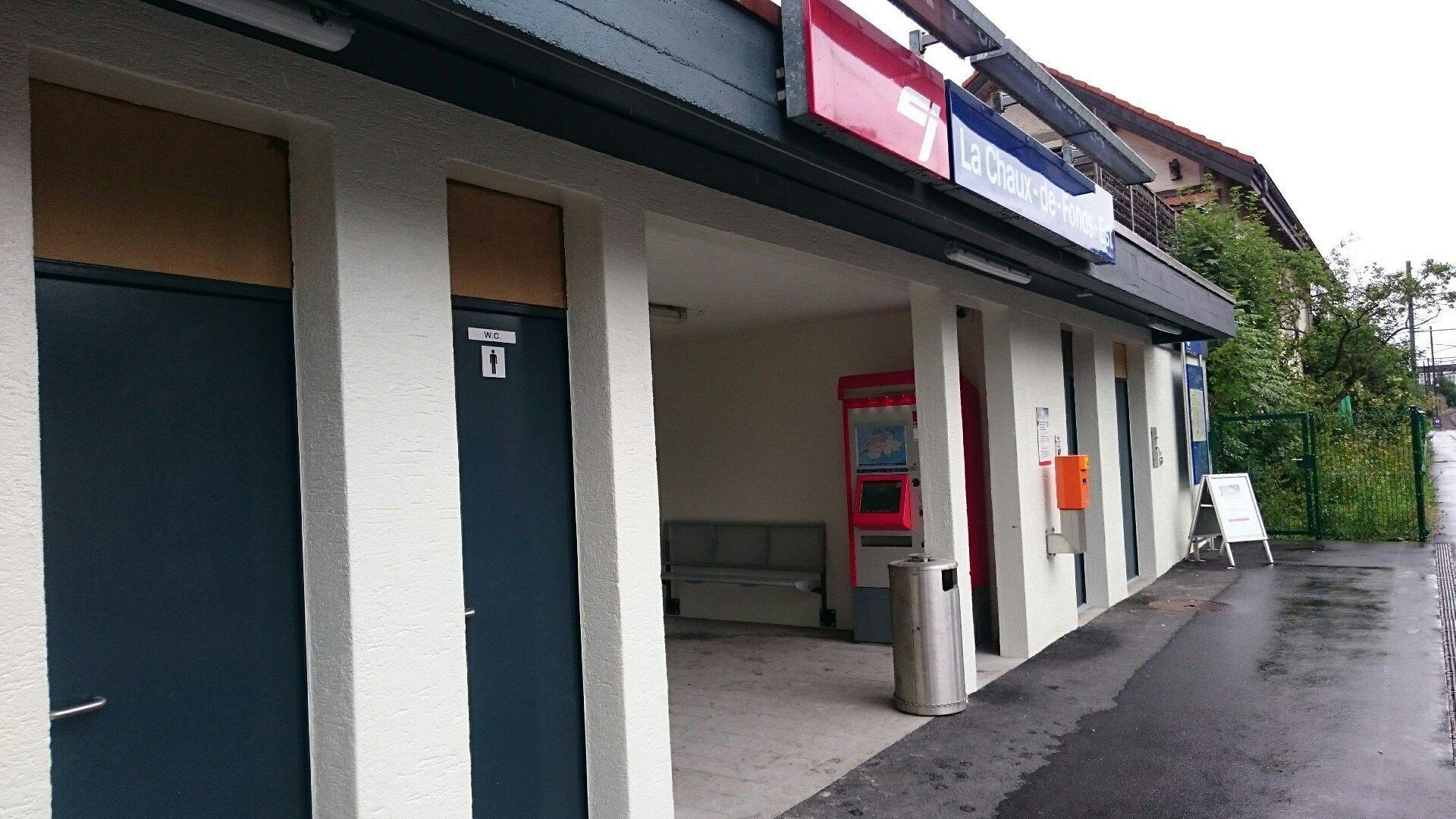
- The station entrance in 2018

General information
- Location: La Chaux-de-Fonds, Neuchâtel; Switzerland
- Coordinates: 47°06′11″N 6°50′13″E
- Elevation: 1,012 m (3,320 ft)
- Owner: Chemins de fer du Jura
- Line: La Chaux-de-Fonds–Glovelier line
- Distance: 43.0 km (26.7 mi) from Tavannes
- Platforms: 1 side platform
- Tracks: 1
- Train operators: Chemins de fer du Jura

Construction
- Accessible: Yes

Other information
- Station code: 8500184 (CFES)
- Fare zone: 20 (Onde Verte)

Services
Preceding station	Chemins de fer du Jura	Following station
La Chaux-de-Fonds Terminus	R36	La Cibourg towards Glovelier
Location
- Location within Switzerland Location within Canton of Neuchâtel

La Chaux-de-Fonds-Est railway station (French: Gare de La Chaux-de-Fonds-Est) is a railway station in the municipality of La Chaux-de-Fonds, in the Swiss canton of Neuchâtel. It is an intermediate stop and a request stop on the 1,000 mm (3 ft 3 3/8 in) metre gauge La Chaux-de-Fonds–Glovelier line of the Chemins de fer du Jura.

== Services ==
As of the December 2023 timetable change, the following services stop at La Chaux-de-Fonds-Est:

- Regio: hourly service between La Chaux-de-Fonds and Glovelier.
