= Le Noirmont =

- Municipality
- Coat of arms
- Location of Le Noirmont
- Location within Switzerland Location within Canton of Jura
- Coordinates: 47°13′N 06°57′E
- Country: Switzerland
- Canton: Jura
- District: Franches-Montagnes

Government
  - Executive: Conseil communal with 7 members
  - Mayor: Maire; Gabriel Martinoli (as of 2026)

Area
  - Total: 20.4 km^{2} (7.9 sq mi)
- Elevation: 971 m (3,186 ft)

Population (2020)
  - Total: 1,914
  - Density: 93.8/km^{2} (243/sq mi)
- Demonym: Noirmonier
- Time zone: UTC+01:00 (CET)
  - Summer (DST): UTC+02:00 (CEST)
- Postal code: 2340
- SFOS number: 6754
- ISO 3166 code: CH-JU
- Surrounded by: Muriaux, Les Breuleux, Les Bois, Saint-Imier(BE), Charquemont(F), Charmauvillers(F)
- Website: https://www.noirmont.ch/

Le Noirmont is a municipality in the district of Franches-Montagnes in the canton of Jura in Switzerland.

== History ==
Le Noirmont is first mentioned in 1454 as Noirmont. The municipality was formerly known by its German name Schwarzenberg, however, that name is no longer used.

== Geography ==
Aerial view (1955)

Le Noirmont has an area of 20.39 km^{2} (7.87 sq mi). Of this area, 10.34 km^{2} (3.99 mi^{2}) or 50.7% is used for agricultural purposes, while 8.7 km^{2} (3.4 mi^{2}) or 42.7% is forested. Of the rest of the land, 1.25 km^{2} (0.48 mi^{2}) or 6.1% is settled (buildings or roads), 0.02 km^{2} (4.9 acres) or 0.1% is either rivers or lakes and 0.12 km^{2} (30 acres) or 0.6% is unproductive land.

Of the built up area, housing and buildings made up 3.0% and transportation infrastructure made up 2.2%. Out of the forested land, 37.7% of the total land area is heavily forested and 5.0% is covered with orchards or small clusters of trees. Of the agricultural land, 1.0% is used for growing crops and 31.4% is pastures and 18.2% is used for alpine pastures. All the water in the municipality is flowing water.

The municipality is located in the Franches-Montagnes district, on a high plateau (elevation c. 1,100 metres [3,600 ft]) that stretches to the Doubs river. It consists of the village of Le Noirmont and the hamlets of Les Barrières, Le Cerneux-Joly, Le Creux-des-Biches, Les Esserts, Le Peu-Péquignot, Sous-les-Craux and Les Côtes.

The municipalities of Le Bémont, Les Bois, Les Breuleux, La Chaux-des-Breuleux, Les Enfers, Les Genevez, Lajoux, Montfaucon, Muriaux, Le Noirmont, Saignelégier, Saint-Brais and Soubey are considering a merger on at a date in the future into the new municipality of Franches-Montagnes.

== Coat of arms ==
The blazon of the municipal coat of arms is Or, a Deer's Head afrontee Sable with a Latin Cross radiating Gules between the antlers and Coupeaux of Six of the second.

== Demographics ==
Le Noirmont has a population (as of December 2020) of 1,914. As of 2008, 12.2% of the population are resident foreign nationals. Over the last 10 years (2000–2010) the population has changed at a rate of 7.2%. Migration accounted for 4.5%, while births and deaths accounted for 1%.

Most of the population (as of 2000) speaks French (1,425 or 91.3%) as their first language, German is the second most common (47 or 3.0%) and Portuguese is the third (29 or 1.9%). There are 25 people who speak Italian.

As of 2008, the population was 48.1% male and 51.9% female. The population was made up of 693 Swiss men (41.7% of the population) and 106 (6.4%) non-Swiss men. There were 768 Swiss women (46.2%) and 95 (5.7%) non-Swiss women. Of the population in the municipality, 643 or about 41.2% were born in Le Noirmont and lived there in 2000. There were 354 or 22.7% who were born in the same canton, while 268 or 17.2% were born somewhere else in Switzerland, and 226 or 14.5% were born outside of Switzerland.

As of 2000, children and teenagers (0–19 years old) make up 25.7% of the population, while adults (20–64 years old) make up 59.1% and seniors (over 64 years old) make up 15.2%.

As of 2000, there were 651 people who were single and never married in the municipality. There were 780 married individuals, 77 widows or widowers and 53 individuals who are divorced.

As of 2000, there were 623 private households in the municipality, and an average of 2.4 persons per household. There were 196 households that consist of only one person and 59 households with five or more people. In 2000, a total of 604 apartments (83.8% of the total) were permanently occupied, while 86 apartments (11.9%) were seasonally occupied and 31 apartments (4.3%) were empty. As of 2009, the construction rate of new housing units was 0.6 new units per 1000 residents. The vacancy rate for the municipality, in 2010, was 0.63%.

The historical population is given in the following chart:

== Heritage sites of national significance ==
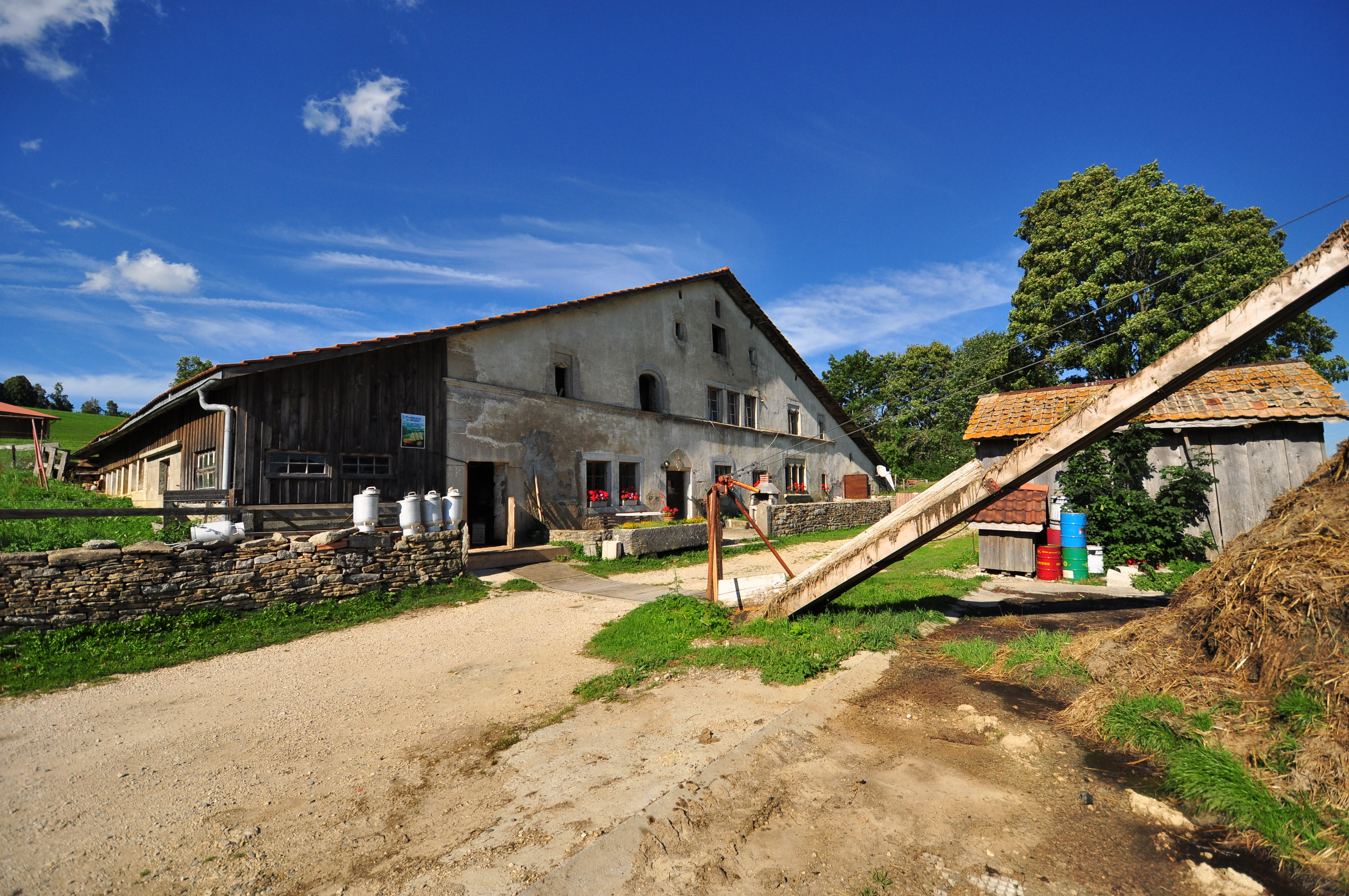
Farm House at Les Esserts 32

The farm house at Les Esserts 32 is listed as a Swiss heritage site of national significance. The entire urban village of Le Noirmont is part of the Inventory of Swiss Heritage Sites.

== Politics ==
In the 2007 federal election the most popular party was the SPS which received 39.64% of the vote. The next three most popular parties were the CSP (22.73%), the FDP (15.22%) and the CVP (12.58%). In the federal election, a total of 483 votes were cast, and the voter turnout was 42.0%.

== Economy ==
As of 2010, Le Noirmont had an unemployment rate of 5.5%. As of 2008, there were 62 people employed in the primary economic sector and about 26 businesses involved in this sector. 647 people were employed in the secondary sector and there were 35 businesses in this sector. 569 people were employed in the tertiary sector, with 68 businesses in this sector. There were 796 residents of the municipality who were employed in some capacity, of which females made up 41.2% of the workforce.

In 2008 the total number of full-time equivalent jobs was 1,137. The number of jobs in the primary sector was 47, of which 41 were in agriculture and 5 were in forestry or lumber production. The number of jobs in the secondary sector was 617 of which 560 or (90.8%) were in manufacturing and 52 (8.4%) were in construction. The number of jobs in the tertiary sector was 473. In the tertiary sector; 173 or 36.6% were in wholesale or retail sales or the repair of motor vehicles, 12 or 2.5% were in the movement and storage of goods, 56 or 11.8% were in a hotel or restaurant, 58 or 12.3% were in the information industry, 7 or 1.5% were the insurance or financial industry, 17 or 3.6% were technical professionals or scientists, 25 or 5.3% were in education and 103 or 21.8% were in health care.

In 2000, there were 801 workers who commuted into the municipality and 354 workers who commuted away. The municipality is a net importer of workers, with about 2.3 workers entering the municipality for every one leaving. About 30.0% of the workforce coming into Le Noirmont are coming from outside Switzerland. Of the working population, 8% used public transportation to get to work, and 57.4% used a private car.

== Transport ==
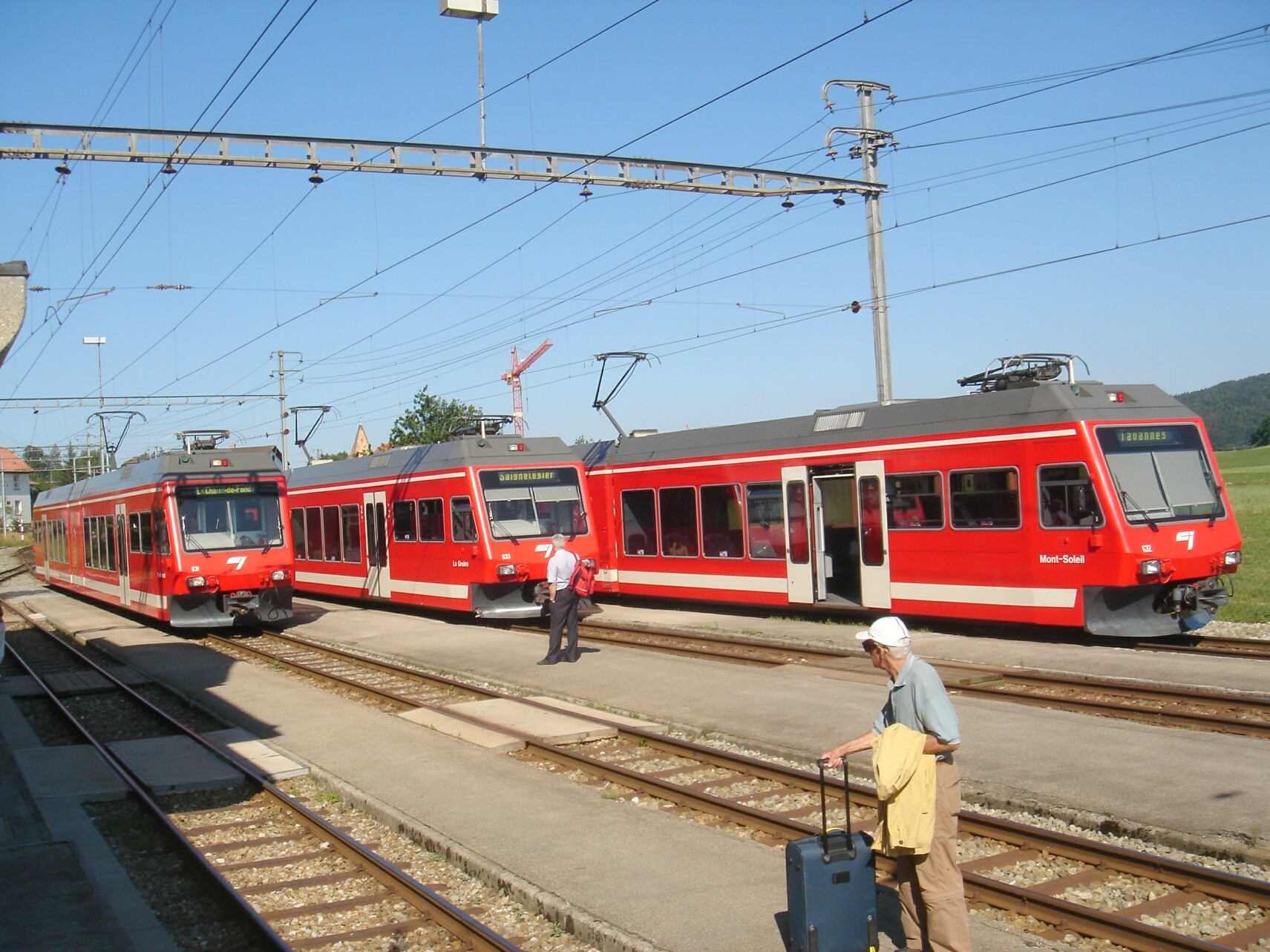
Train station at Le Noirmont

The municipality has two railway stations, Le Noirmont and Le Creux-des-Biches. The former is located at the junction of the La Chaux-de-Fonds–Glovelier and Tavannes–Noirmont lines, while the latter is located to the west along the La Chaux-de-Fonds–Glovelier line.

== Religion ==
From the 2000 census, 1,159 or 74.2% were Roman Catholic, while 159 or 10.2% belonged to the Swiss Reformed Church. Of the rest of the population, there was 1 member of an Orthodox church, and there were 73 individuals (or about 4.68% of the population) who belonged to another Christian church. There were 31 (or about 1.99% of the population) who were Islamic. There were 5 individuals who were Buddhist and 1 individual who belonged to another church. 97 (or about 6.21% of the population) belonged to no church, are agnostic or atheist, and 70 individuals (or about 4.48% of the population) did not answer the question.

== Education ==
In Le Noirmont about 544 or (34.8%) of the population have completed non-mandatory upper secondary education, and 125 or (8.0%) have completed additional higher education (either university or a Fachhochschule). Of the 125 who completed tertiary schooling, 64.0% were Swiss men, 24.8% were Swiss women, 7.2% were non-Swiss men and 4.0% were non-Swiss women.

The Canton of Jura school system provides two year of non-obligatory Kindergarten, followed by six years of Primary school. This is followed by three years of obligatory lower Secondary school where the students are separated according to ability and aptitude. Following the lower Secondary students may attend a three or four year optional upper Secondary school followed by some form of Tertiary school or they may enter an apprenticeship.

During the 2009–10 school year, there were a total of 260 students attending 15 classes in Le Noirmont. There were 2 kindergarten classes with a total of 37 students in the municipality. The municipality had 7 primary classes and 123 students. During the same year, there were 6 lower secondary classes with a total of 100 students.

As of 2000, there were 43 students in Le Noirmont who came from another municipality, while 46 residents attended schools outside the municipality.
