= La Traction =

Swiss railway preservation group

La Traction is a Swiss volunteer railway preservation group based at Pré-Petitjean on the line of the Chemins de fer du Jura (CJ).

Their special trains operate, on selected dates throughout the year, over three routes in the area, Glovelier to Saignelégier, Saignelégier to La Chaux-de-Fonds and "The Hard Climb" from Tavannes to la Noirmont.

The group owns two metre-gauge Mallet type locomotives which were purchased from Portugal in 1992 and were restored in Germany, one in 1993, the other six years later, and a selection of passenger rolling stock which is used on their special trains. They are restoring a "Krocodil" locomotive.

Locomotive details:

- No. E206 : 2-4-6-0T, Outside Cylinders (4), Built Henschel & Son, 1913. Mallet-type compound locomotive delivered to Portuguese railways (CP) and withdrawn in 1985. It was restored at Meiningen in Germany and returned to traffic in 1993.
- No. E164 : 0-4-4-0T, Outside Cylinders (4), Built Henschel & Sohnin, 1905. Mallet-type compound locomotive delivered to Portuguese Railways (CP) and withdrawn in 1978. It was restored at Meiningen in Germany and returned to traffic in 1999.
- No. E4004 : Class Gem122, a "Krocodil" type locomotive built for Spanish Railways. This was undergoing restoration in 2007.

== See also ==
- List of heritage railways and funiculars in Switzerland
