= Régional Saignelégier–Glovelier =

Swiss railway company

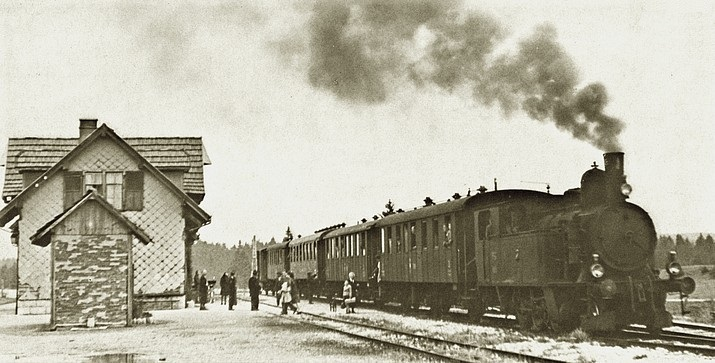
- RSG train hauled by steam engine Ed 3/4 No. 1 in Montfaucon station

Overview
- Locale: Switzerland

Service
- Route number: 236

Technical
- Line length: 24.89 km (15.47 mi)
- Track gauge: since: 1953 1,000 mm (3 ft 3 3/8 in) metre gauge
- Old gauge: until 1948: 1,435 mm (4 ft 8 1/2 in) standard gauge
- Electrification: since 1953: 1500 V DC overhead catenary
- Maximum incline: 2.5%

The Régional Saignelégier–Glovelier (RSG) was a railway company that operated a metre-gauge railway from Saignelégier to Glovelier in Switzerland. In 1944, the railway was merged to form the Chemins de fer du Jura (CJ), which converted the line to metre gauge and electrified it at 1500 Volt DC. Today, the line is part of the La Chaux-de-Fonds–Glovelier line.

== History ==
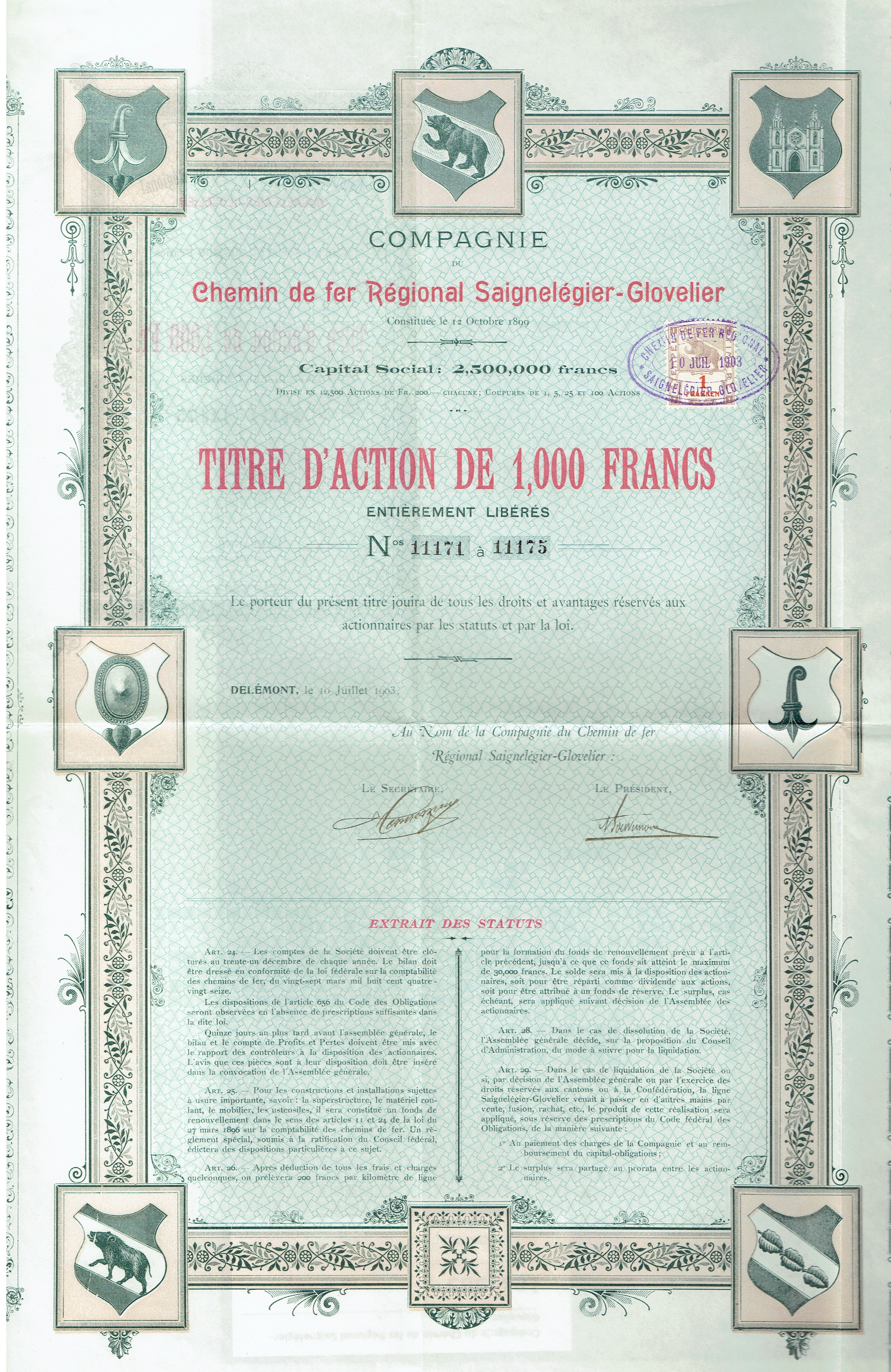
Share of the Chemin de fer Régional Saignelégier-Glovelier, issued 10 July 1903

The main lines, which were formed quite early in the Jura were built primarily to connect to France and did not serve the Franches-Montagnes. The metre-gauge Saignelégier–La Chaux-de-Fonds Railway (Chemin de fer Saignelégier-La Chaux-de-Fonds, SC) opened a line over the Franches-Montagnes plateau in 1892. The Régional Saignelégier–Glovelier opened the extension from Saignelégier to Glovelier on 21 May 1904. However, the RSG was built to standard gauge to simplify the operation of its extensive livestock and timber traffic. On 1 July 1910, the RSG formed a joint venture with the standard gauge Régional Porrentruy–Bonfol (RPB).

However, traffic did not develop as expected in the sparsely populated area. As early as 1906, the RSG was forced into liquidation. Revenue came almost equally from freight and passenger traffic from 1917, while freight traffic became more important after 1920. The financial situation of the railway remained difficult despite a financial reconstruction in 1908. Operations were in deficit several times up to 1918 and almost continuously in deficit from 1918 to 1944, causing the railway facilities to become run down.

The merger of the RSG with the Saignelégier–La Chaux-de-Fonds Railway (SC), the Tavannes–Noirmont Railway (Chemin de fer Tavannes–Noirmont, CTN) and the Régional Porrentruy–Bonfol (RPB) to form the Chemins de fer du Jura, which was completed on 1 January 1944, created the basis for a radical renewal of the line.

== Operations by the Chemins de fer du Jura ==
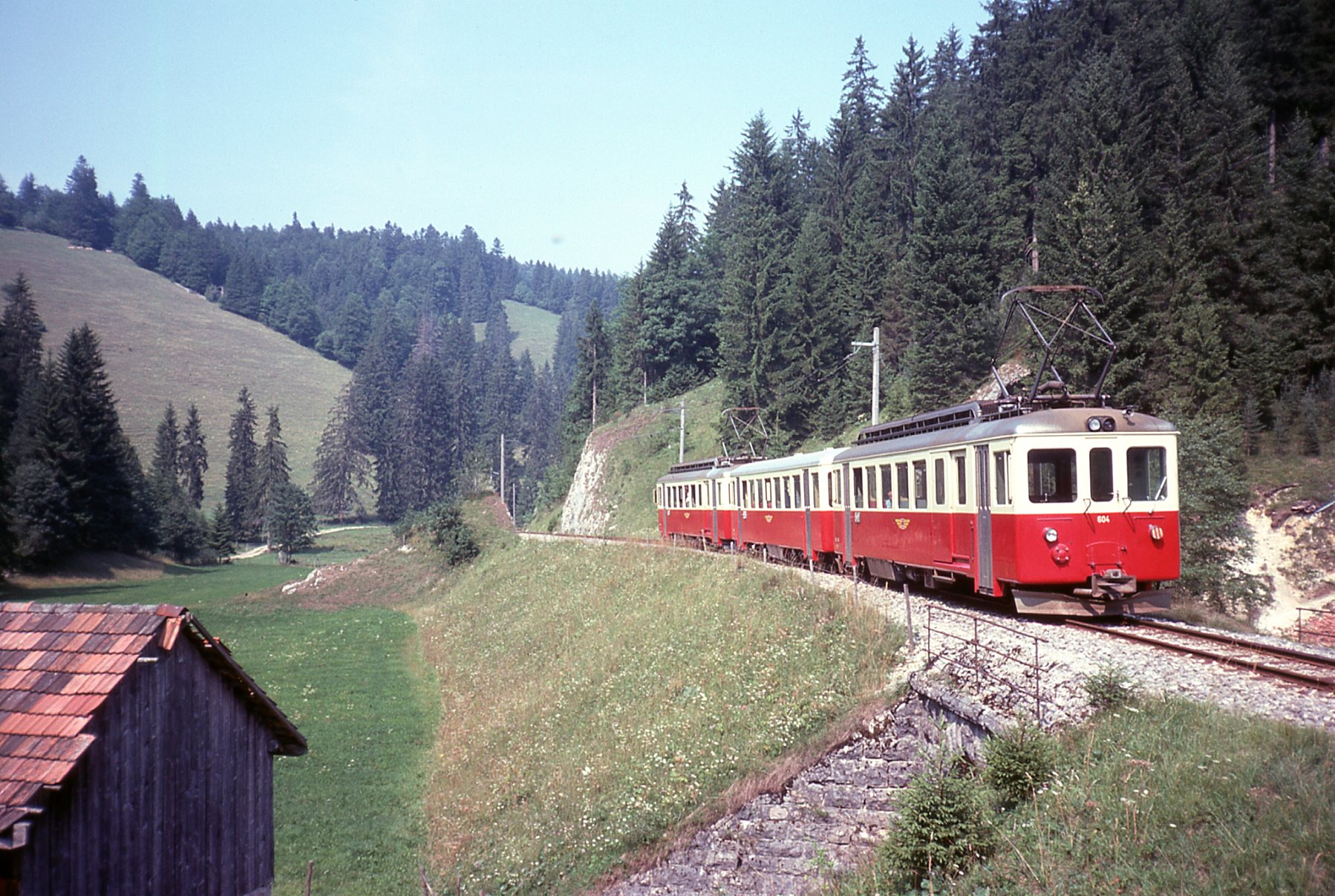
Train of the Chemins de fer du Jura (CJ) in 1976 in Pré-Petitjean.

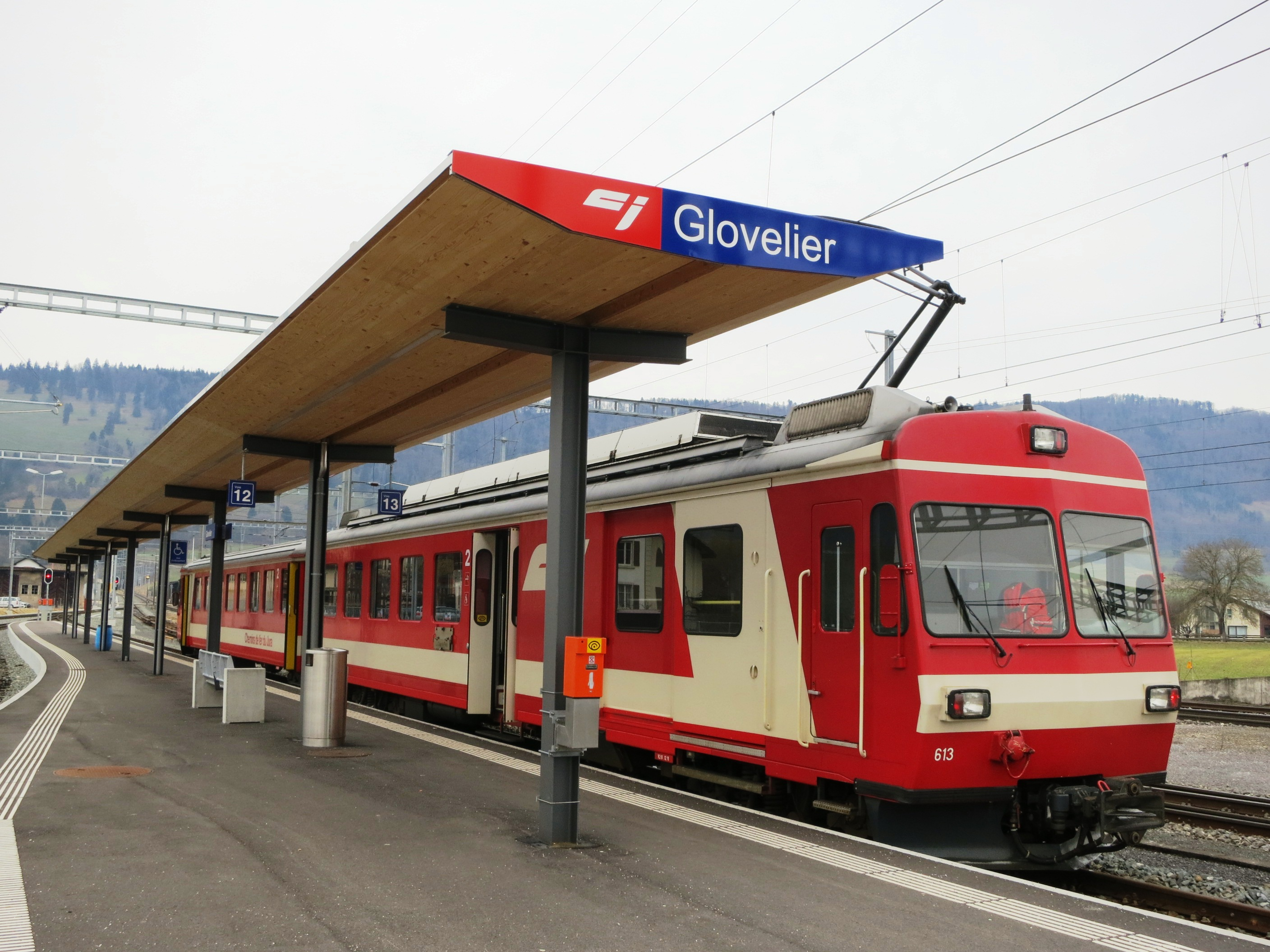
CJ commuter train ready for departure at the renovated Glovelier station.

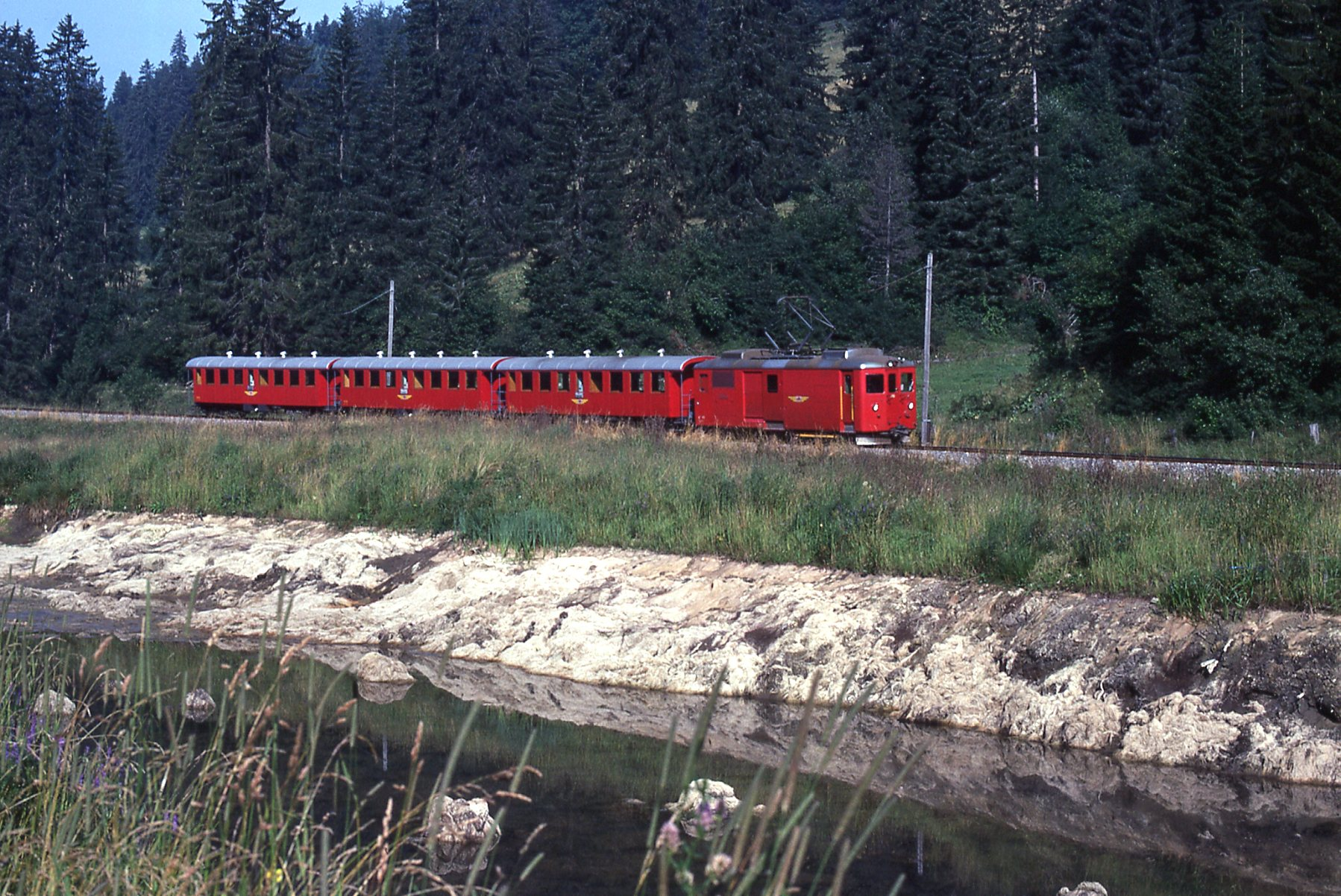
Passenger train with De 4/4 luggage van and B 761–763 carriages with open platforms between Pré-Petitjean and La Combe in 1977.

Passenger traffic on the Saignelégier–Glovelier line had to be discontinued because of poor track conditions on 8 May 1948. To simplify operations of the railway was then converted to metre gauge and was operated from 4 October 1953 as a metre-gauge railway with 1500 V DC and new rolling stock. Two substations in Pré-Petitjean and Sceut supply the line with electricity.

Several cubic metres of rock fell on the railway track near the Bollement Tunnel on 16 April 1968. A train travelling from Saignelégier to Glovelier ran into the rubble and derailed, injuring twelve people.

Glovelier station was rebuilt in 2012/13. A new platform was built so that passengers no longer had to board the CJ trains in the street. The transhipment of containers carrying garbage from trucks to trains was moved from the street to the area of the former freight shed.

=== Current operations ===
The La Chaux-de-Fonds–Saignelégier–Glovelier passenger trains run almost continuously at hourly intervals. In addition, the CJ operates a bus route serving the towns directly. The Saignelégier route, published in table 22.134 of the timetable, was extended beyond Glovelier to Boécourt in 2013. The Marché-Concours national de chevaux horse race takes place in Saignelégier in August.

Freight trains run regularly on the line from Monday to Friday. Garbage has been carried from Glovelier to the incinerator in La Chaux-de-Fonds since 2000. In addition, standard-gauge wagons are carried on transporter wagons, which primarily carry timber logs, fuel oil, gravel and road salt. Scheduled steam trains are operated by La Traction from Pré-Petitjean to Glovelier, Tavannes or La Chaux-de-Fonds from July to September.

=== Extension to Delémont ===
The construction of a metre-gauge line between Glovelier and Delémont has been sought to avoid the need for passengers travelling to Delémont changing in Glovelier. The line, which would have run parallel to the Transjurane for long stretches, would have opened up Develier. The project was budgeted to cost CHF 97.5 million. Although the federal government would have funded 85 percent of the cost, the canton of Jura rejected the provision of its share the funding in a referendum on 17 May 1992.

For some time, CJ has been promoting the building of a third rail on the Glovelier–Delémont SBB line. The cost is estimated at CHF 34 million. Four train sets would be needed for the continuous service from Delémont to La Chaux-de-Fonds. Because the CJ is electrified at 1500 Volt DC and the SBB at 15 kV AC, multi-system equipment would be required.

== Route description ==
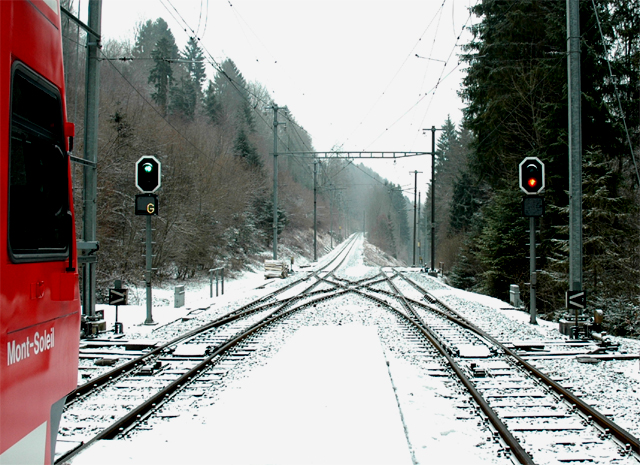
Zig zag in Combe-Tabeillon. The left track leads to Saignelégier, the right to Glovelier.

The 25-kilometre line connects Saignelégier with SBB's Glovelier station, which is about 500 metres lower. After the exit from Saignelégier station the line runs down a gentle slope to Le Bémont and on to the halt of Pré-Petitjean (formerly Montfaucon), where the depot of the La Traction heritage railway is located. From there it is possible to see the bell tower of the Montfaucon church. It is typical of the neighbouring Franche-Comté.

The line runs on a 2.5% slope past the small lake of Plain de Saigne to the halt of La Combe (formerly Lajoux station). At the crossing station of Bollement (formerly Saulcy), the Etang de Bollement (pond) can be seen. Running along the rocky abyss of Combe-Tabeillon, the line passes through several short tunnels and the former halts of Sceut and Le Fondeval (formerly Saint-Brais). After running through the Foradrai tunnel, the line passes through a horseshoe curve. In Combe-Tabeillon station, the trains reverse a second time at a zig zag. The use of push–pull trains has simplified operations since electrification. The descent continues along the Tabeillon stream to Glovelier. The line takes a long right turn to reach the local station, where it is possible to transfer to SBB services to continue to Delémont or Porrentruy.

== RSG rolling stock ==
Traction vehicles of the RSC	Ed 3/4	CFZm 1/3	
Numbering:	1 – 3	4	5
Wheel arrangement:	1'C	1'A1	
Length over buffer:	8380 mm	12,840 mm	12,900 mm
Fixed wheelbase:	2500 mm	4500 mm	
Total wheelbase:	4530 mm	7500 mm	
Service weight:	39.7 t	ca. 32 t	
Adhesive weight:	33.6 t	13 t	
Maximum speed:	45 km/h	45 km/h	
Driving wheel diameter:	1030 mm	1030 mm	
Cylinder diameter:	380 mm	250 mm	
Piston stroke:	550 mm	400 mm	
Boiler pressure:	13 atm	12 atm	
Grate area:	1.5 m^{2}	0.8 m^{2}	0.7 m^{2}
Superheater area:	8.0 m^{2}	3.8 m^{2}	3.1 m^{2}
Total heating surface:	91,0 m^{2}	36.1 m^{2}	33.6 m^{2}
Water supply:	4.0 m³	1.5 m³	
Coal supply:	0.8 t	0.6 t	

=== Locomotives Ed 3/4 1 – 3 ===
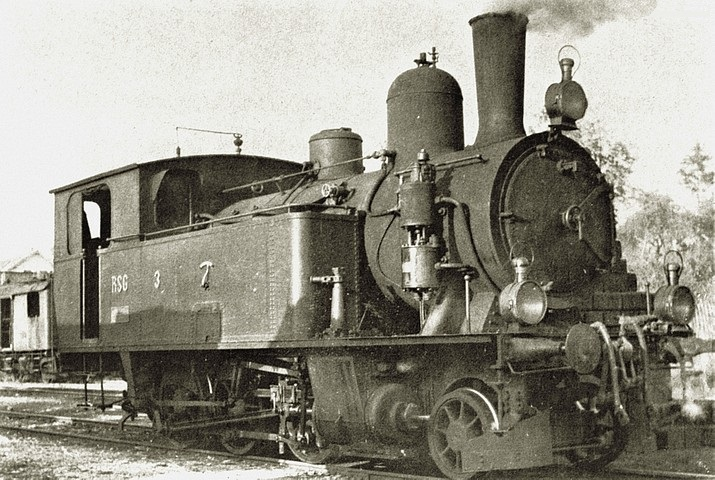
Steam locomotive Ed 3/4 no. 3

The Swiss Locomotive and Machine Works (SLM) in Winterthur delivered three steam locomotives, Ed 3/4 1 to 3, for the commencement of operations in 1903. The locomotives corresponded to a standard type first built in 1902, which was designed for the Seetal Railway and several were built for small secondary lines. The machines had a relatively large boiler and developed an output of around 500 hp.

After the procurement of the two steam railcars, the locomotives were only used in front of freight trains and heavy passenger trains. Number 2 was sold to the associated Porrentruy–Bonfol railway (RPB) in 1934. This locomotive was sold in 1949 to Sulzer for factory operations in Oberwinterthur. Its task at the Régional Porrentruy–Bonfol was taken over by Ed 3/4 3. Ed 3/4 1, which was the only one to receive a superheater (in 1939), was also sold to Sulzer after the regauging of the Saignelégier–Glovelier line at the end of 1952 and was used at the Winterthur works. Ed 3/4 1 was scrapped in 1957 and No. 3 was scrapped in 1956. The only surviving steam locomotive of the CJ is Ed 3/4 2 taken over by the Dampfbahn-Verein Zürcher Oberland in 1972.

=== Steam railcars CFZm 1/3 4 and 5 ===
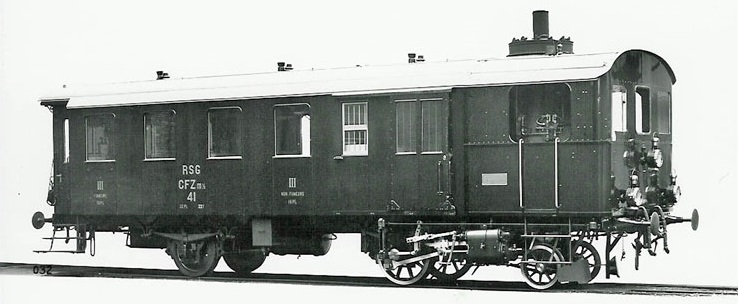
Steam railcar CFZm 1/3 no. 4 on delivery in 1910.

Haulage of the poorly occupied passenger trains by steam locomotives was very costly. Therefore, the RSC procured a CFZm 1/3 steam railcar in 1910 and another in 1913 from SLM for one-man operation. The extremely economical vehicles were equipped with a passenger, a luggage and a postal compartment. The same railcars were also acquired by the Huttwil–Eriswil railway (Huttwil-Eriswil-Bahn, HEB) and the Ramsei-Sumiswald-Huttwil-Bahn (RSHB).

The railcars were supported on three axles in order not to exceed the permissible axle load. The middle axle powered the vehicle. While a normal railcar axle supported the rear, the front axle was arranged in a Bissel bogie. The standing boiler was equipped with a superheater and was located above the railcar. The coal box was next to the boiler and the water tank was suspended in the bogie. The only cab was located next to the boiler. When running in reverse, the driver had to watch the track from the rear platform; he could use a whistle and an emergency brake. The steel frame proved too weak and had to be stiffened later.

After the regauging and electrification of the line, steam railcars no. 5 and no. 4 were taken out of service and scrapped in 1952 and 1954 respectively.
