= Saignelégier railway station =

Railway station in Saignelégier, Switzerland

Saignelégier
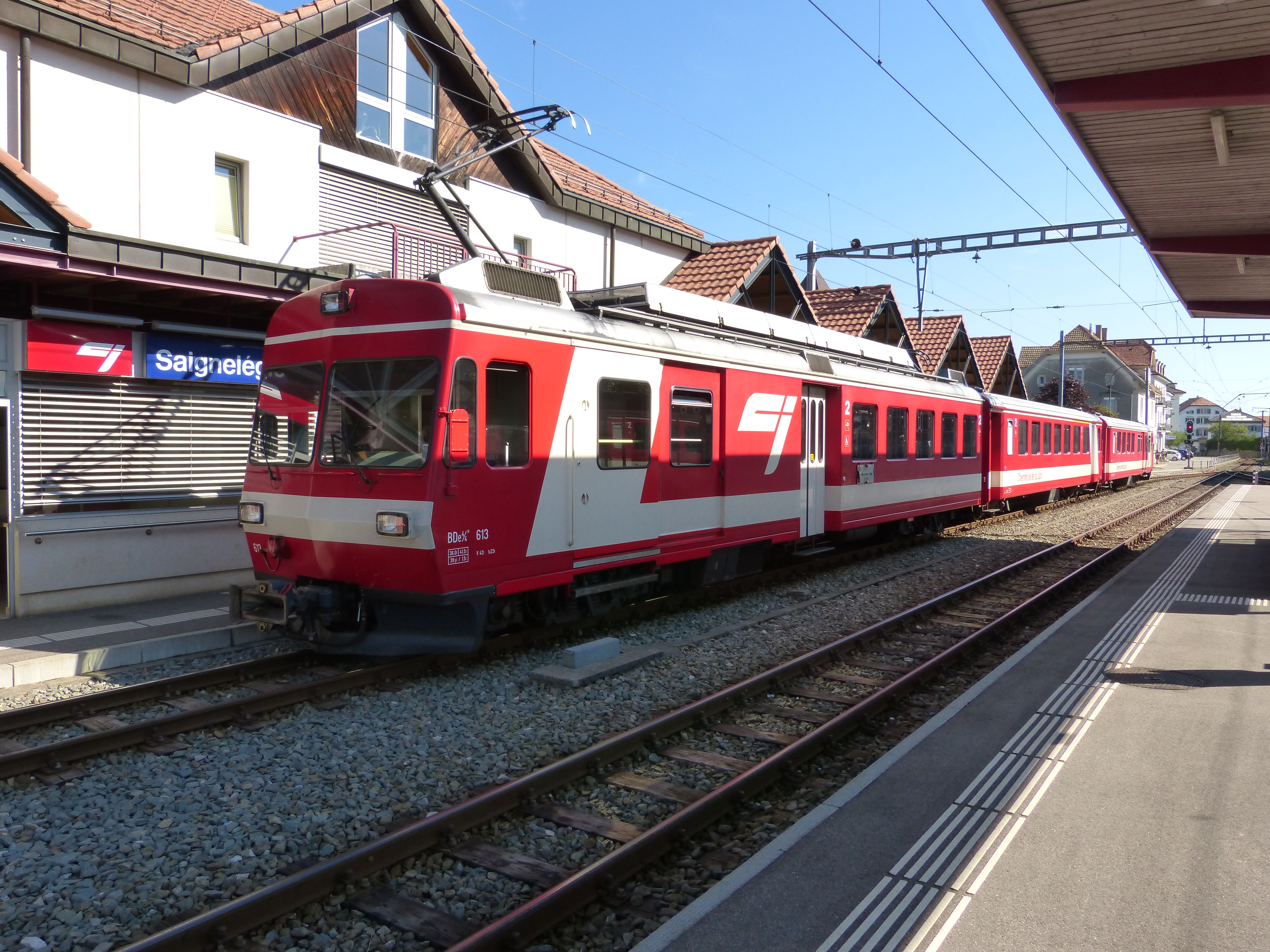
- A regional train at the station in 2015

General information
- Location: Saignelégier, Jura; Switzerland
- Coordinates: 47°15′17″N 6°59′40″E
- Elevation: 982 m (3,222 ft)
- Owner: Chemins de fer du Jura
- Line: La Chaux-de-Fonds–Glovelier line
- Distance: 5.4 km (3.4 mi) from Le Noirmont
- Platforms: 3: 1 island platform; 1 side platform
- Tracks: 3
- Train operators: Chemins de fer du Jura
- Connections: CarPostal SA bus lines

Construction
- Accessible: Yes

Other information
- Station code: 8500191 (SAIG)
- Fare zone: 42 (Onde Verte); 41 and 42 (Vagabond)

Services
Preceding station	Chemins de fer du Jura	Following station
Muriaux towards La Chaux-de-Fonds	R36	Le Bémont towards Glovelier
Location
- Location within Switzerland Location within Canton of Jura

Saignelégier railway station (French: Gare de Saignelégier) is a railway station in the municipality of Saignelégier, in the Swiss canton of Jura. It is located on the 1,000 mm (3 ft 3 3/8 in) La Chaux-de-Fonds–Glovelier line of the Chemins de fer du Jura. Historically, the station was the meeting point of the two companies that built the original line, the Chemin de fer Saignelégier-La Chaux-de-Fonds and the Régional Saignelégier–Glovelier, and the Chemins de fer du Jura still maintains depot facilities adjacent to the station.

== Services ==
As of the December 2023 timetable change, the following services stop at Saignelégier:

- Regio: hourly service between La Chaux-de-Fonds and Glovelier.
