= La Chaux-de-Fonds–Glovelier line =

Narrow gauge railway line in Switzerland

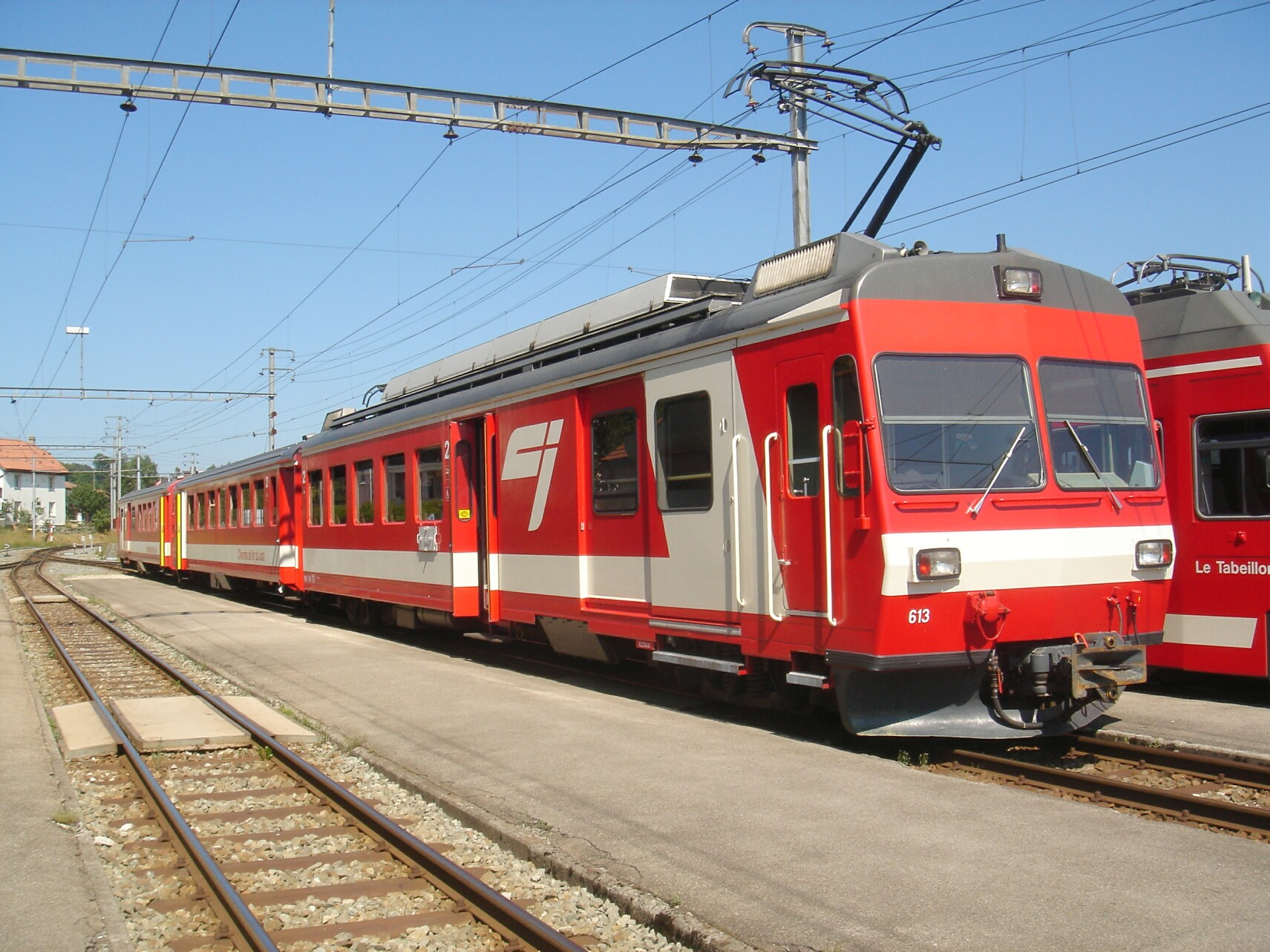
- La Chaux-de-Fonds–Glovelier line

Overview
- Owner: Chemins de fer du Jura
- Line number: 236
- Termini: La Chaux-de-Fonds; Glovelier

Technical
- Line length: 53.3 km (33.1 mi)
- Track gauge: 1,000 mm (3 ft 3 3/8 in) metre gauge
- Electrification: 1500 V DC overhead catenary

The La Chaux-de-Fonds–Glovelier line is a 1,000 mm (3 ft 3 3/8 in) railway line in the cantons of Jura, Bern, and Neuchâtel in Switzerland. The line was originally built by two companies, the Chemin de fer Saignelégier-La Chaux-de-Fonds and Régional Saignelégier–Glovelier, and has been owned and operated by the Chemins de fer du Jura since 1944.

== Route ==
=== La Chaux-de-Fonds–Saignelégier ===
The Chemin de fer Saignelégier-La Chaux-de-Fonds opened a line between La Chaux-de-Fonds and Saignelégier on 7 December 1892. The company merged with three other companies to form the Chemins de fer du Jura in 1944.

=== Saignelégier–Glovelier ===
The Régional Saignelégier–Glovelier opened a line between Saignelégier and Glovelier on 21 May 1904. The company merged with three other companies to form the Chemins de fer du Jura in 1944.
