= Tavannes–Noirmont railway line =

Railway line in Switzerland

Tavannes–Noirmont
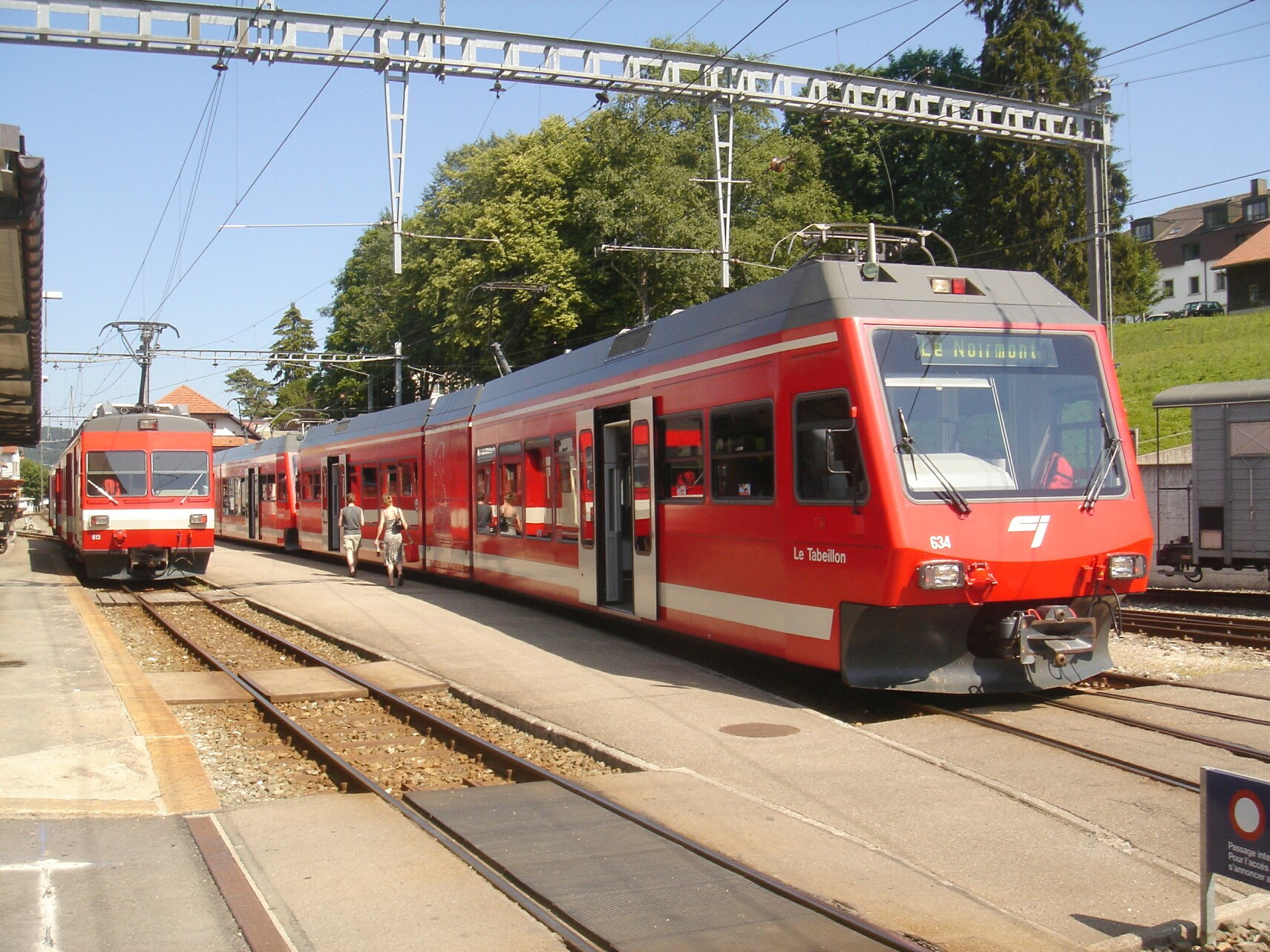
- BDe 4/4 613 (left) and beside it GTW ABe 634 and 631 coupled sets in Tramelan in 2006

Overview
- Owner: Chemins de fer du Jura
- Line number: 237
- Locale: Switzerland
- Termini: Tavannes; Le Noirmont

Technical
- Line length: 22.96 km (14.27 mi)
- Track gauge: 1,000 mm (3 ft 3 3/8 in) metre gauge
- Electrification: Overhead line, 1,200 V DC (1913–1953); Overhead line, 1,500 V DC (1953–present)
- Maximum incline: 5.0%

The Tavannes–Noirmont railway line is a metre-gauge railway line in western Switzerland. The Tramelan-Tavannes Railway (French: Chemin de fer de Tramelan à Tavannes) opened the first section in 1884; the Tramelan – Breuleux – Noirmont Railway (French: Compagnie du chemin de fer Tramelan – Breuleux – Noirmont) completed the line between Tramelan and Le Noirmont in 1913. The line was electrified in 1913 and has belonged to the Chemins de fer du Jura (CJ) since 1944.

== History ==
=== Tramelan-Tavannes Railway ===
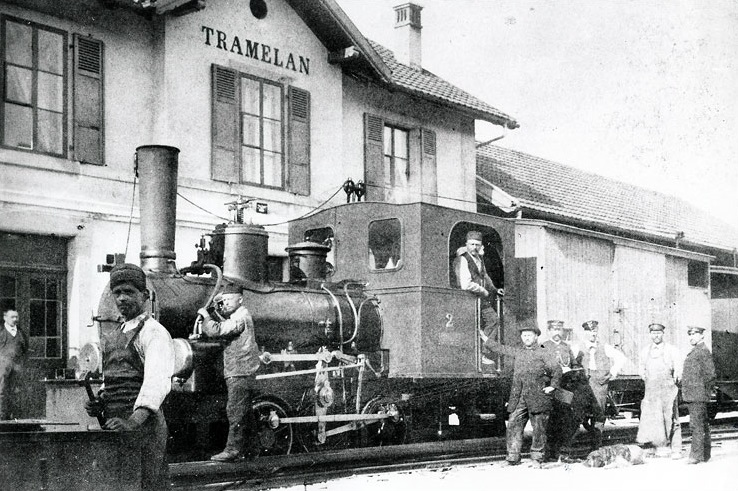
TT freight train hauled by locomotive no. 2 in Tramelan in about 1910.

The first railway lines in the Jura were built to connect Switzerland with France. Afterwards efforts were made to connect areas that were not yet developed with Lokalbahnen ("local lines") to the main lines.

The metre-gauge Tavannes-Tramelan railway was opened as a branch line on 16 August 1884 by the Tramelan-Tavannes Railway (TT) (French: Chemin de fer de Tramelan à Tavannes). The 9 km-long line connected Tramelan with Tavannes, which lay on the existing standard-gauge Sonceboz-Sombeval–Moutier railway opened on 1874. The railway was, after the Lausanne–Echallens (1873), the Rigi-Scheidegg (1874), the Herisau–Urnäsch (1875) and the Waldenburg (1880) lines, one of the first Swiss narrow gauge railways and served as a model for many similar operations.

The railway was initially operated with two class G 2/2 two-axle tender locomotives. A third locomotive was acquired in 1891. A very high level of performance was required for the steam locomotives as the line had gradients of up to 4.0 percent. Shortly before the electrification, the locomotives were equipped with new boilers.

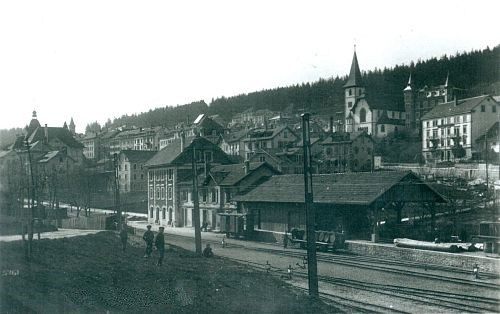
Tramelan station after the electrification of the TT and the opening of the TBN.

Electrical operations at 1200 volts DC commenced on 15 November 1913. The reason for the electrification was the opening of the meter-gauge, electrically operated Tramelan-Breuleux-Noirmont Railway (TBN).

For electric operations, the TT procured two BCe 2/4 railcars (nos. 60–61) and a two-axle locomotive of class Ge 2/2 (no. 4). Both types of vehicles had the same electrical equipment. The three units were identical to the two railcars, 70–71, and the Ge 2/2 locomotive no. 5 of the TBN. While the railcars were procured for passenger trains, the two locomotives hauled freight trains and were used when double-heading was needed.

The electric supply to the catenary of the two lines was carried out through a substation in Tramelan, which was equipped with backup batteries.

The TT mainly served passenger traffic. At times it was able to pay a modest dividend. Investment in catenaries and new rolling stock were necessary for the electrification in 1913. The First World War led to additional revenue from both passenger and freight transport. In 1917, the railway had the best operating result in its history. Thereafter, however, sharply rising operating expenses affected the balance sheet.

=== Tramelan – Breuleux – Noirmont Railway ===
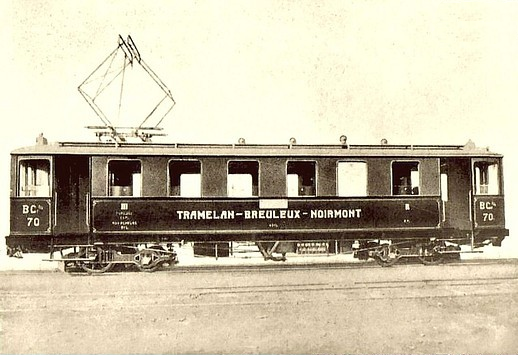
Railcar BCe 2/2 of the TBN on delivery.

Advances in electrical engineering enabled the continuation of the narrow gauge line from Tramelan through the heights to Les Breuleux and Le Noirmont to connect to the Saignelégier–La Chaux-de-Fonds railway (SC) (French: Chemin de fer Saignelégier–La Chaux-de-Fonds). The Tramelan-Breuleux-Noirmont Railway (TBN) was operated at 1200 volts DC from its opening on 16 December 1913.

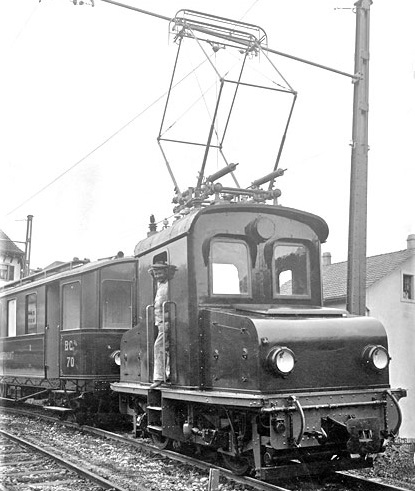
Ge 2/2 of the CTN in Tavannes. Railcar BCe 2/4 no. 70 is visible behind.

As already mentioned, the TBN procured two BCe 2/4 railcars (70–71) and Ge 2/2 locomotive (5).

The outbreak of the First World War in 1914 led to increased traffic at the TBN and led to financial relief. At the beginning of the 1920s, declining income from passenger transport increasingly led to financial difficulties.

=== Tavannes–Noirmont Railway ===
The TT and the TBN, which opened in 1913, formed a joint operating arrangement and operated the line with the electric rolling stock running through from Tavannes to Le Noirmont. The Saignelégier-La Chaux-de-Fonds Railway (SC) continued to use steam locomotives on the line from Le Noirmont to La Chaux-de-Fonds which made through running difficult.

Since 1 May 1921, standard gauge freight cars have been loaded on transporter wagons in Tavannes, so that they can be carried on the narrow gauge line to Le Noirmont.

On 1 January 1927, the two electrically operated railways TT and TBN, which previously formed a joint venture, joined to form the Tavannes–Le Noirmont Railway (French: Chemin de fer Tavannes – Le Noirmont). But even after the merger, the operating results remained modest and the infrastructure became obsolete.

The Tavannes–Noirmont Railway was merged on 1 January 1944 with the SC and two standard gauge railways, the Régional Saignelégier–Glovelier (RSG) and the Régional Porrentruy–Bonfol (RPB) to form the Chemins de fer du Jura (CJ).

=== Chemins de fer du Jura ===
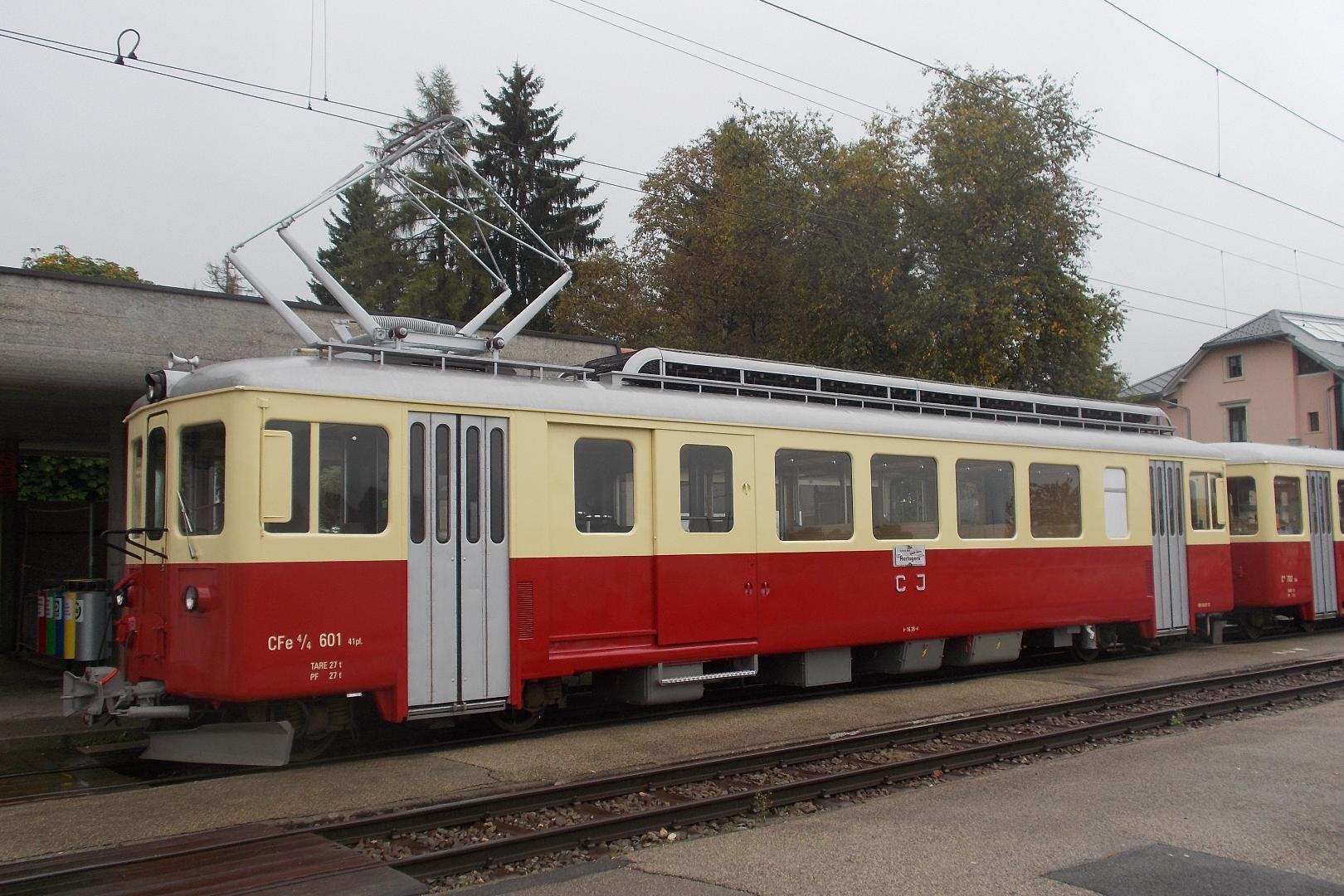
Railcar CFe 4/4 601, which was built at the beginning of the CJ, in Le Noirmont.

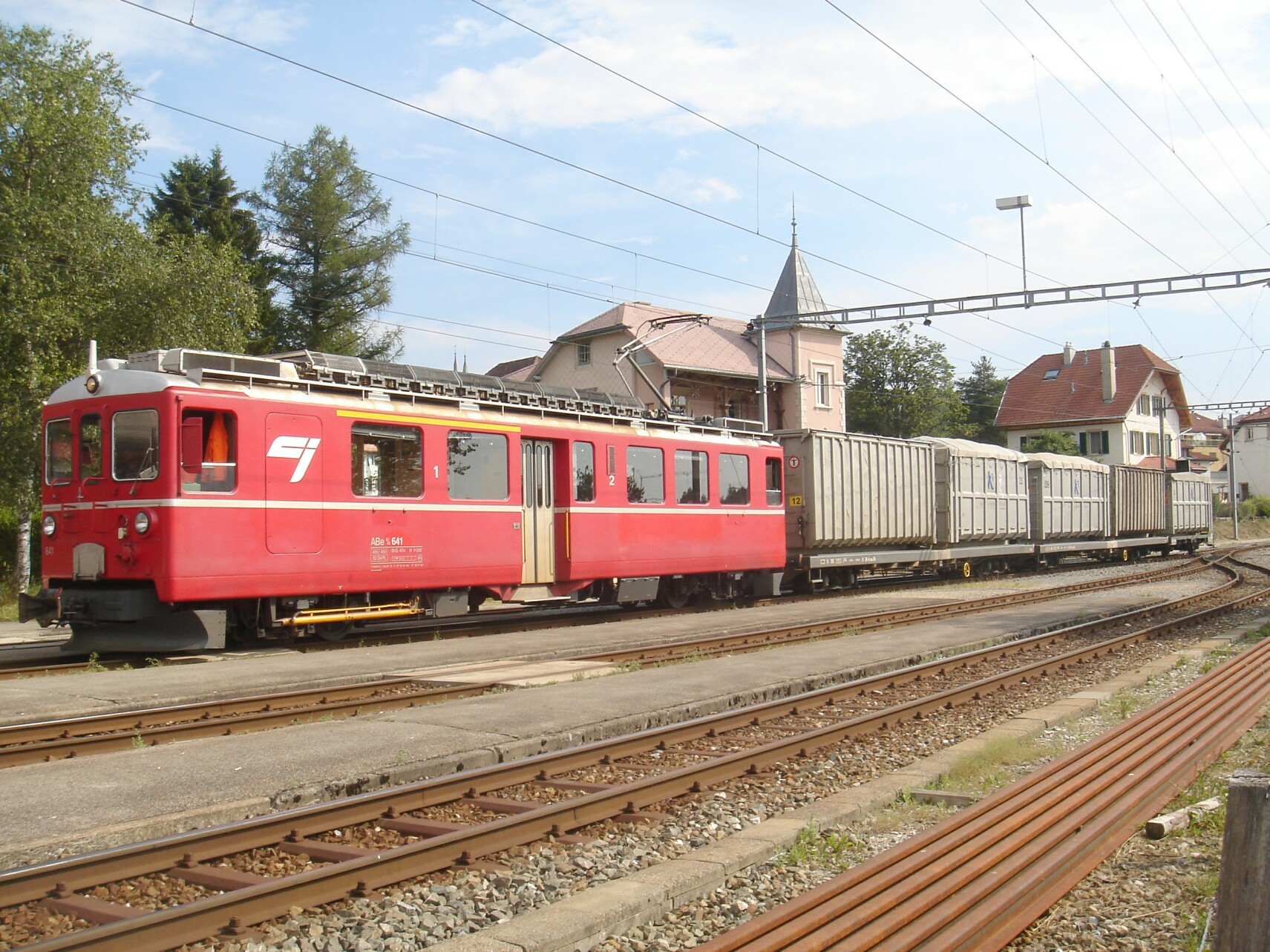
Waste train with an ABe 4/4 railcar from the Arosa Railway in Le Noirmont.

With the merger of the four railway companies in the then Bernese Jura, the foundation was laid for a comprehensive technical renovation. The CJ has operated its entire metre-gauge network with 1500 volt DC since 4 October 1953. For this purpose, the overhead line voltage was increased from 1200 to 1500 volts DC. The converter plant in Tramelan was replaced by three rectifiers in Orange, Les Reussilles and Le Noirmont. The rolling stock was almost completely replaced by new vehicles. No changes were made to the existing locomotives.

A train carrying railway staff crashed into a train carrying train axles at Orange between Tramelan and Tavannes on 27 October 1953. Two railway employees were killed by axles flying off a flatcar hauled by Ge 2/2 5. The railway staff train had not waited in Orange to allow the trains to cross.

The 246 metre-long Tavannes viaduct was opened in 1966 to separate the railway from the road in the village of Tavannes.

== Current operations ==
Passenger services run between Le Noirmont and Tavannes almost continuously every hour. They connect with La Chaux-de-Fonds–Saignelégier–Glovelier services in Le Noirmont. There are connections with the regional trains of the SBB towards Sonceboz-Sombeval and Biel/Bienne in Tavannes.

Freight trains run on the line regularly from Monday to Friday. Waste has been carried from Tavannes to the La Chaux-de-Fonds incinerator since 2000. In addition, standard-gauge wagons are carried on transporter wagons, which primarily carry timber logs, fuel oil, gravel and road salt.

Scheduled steam trains are operated by La Traction on the Pré-Petitjean–Saignelégier–Le Noirmont–Tavannes route from July to September.

A depot in Tramelan, where the workshop for all CJ vehicles is located, is used to maintain rolling stock used in regular traffic. Transports Régionaux Neuchâtelois (TRN) rolling stock is also regularly maintained at the local underfloor lathe. Construction service vehicles are maintained at a single-track carriage shed in Le Noirmont.

== Route description ==
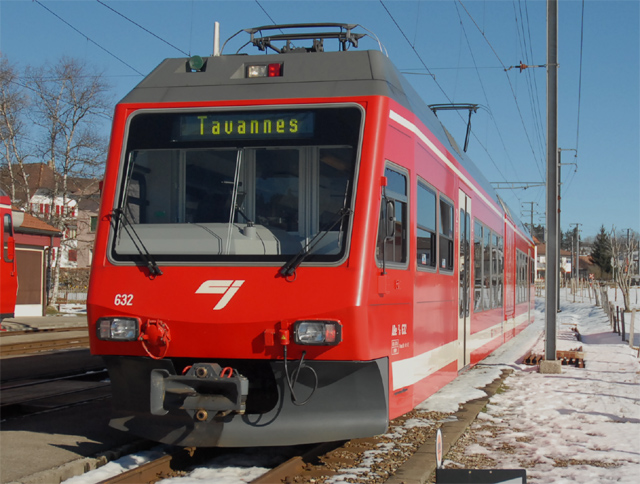
GTW ABe 632 set outside Tavanne.

The line leaves Tavannes station running parallel to the SBB line to Moutier. After a few metres, it turns left and crosses the Birs on the 246 metre-long Tavannes viaduct. After that, the line runs with a 4.0 percent gradient through meadows and fields. The almost flat route follows the Trame stream from the Orange crossing loop to the halt of Tramelan-Dessous. Trains arrive at Tramelan, home of the CJ's main workshop.

After Tramelan station, the line climbs at 5.0 percent on a winding route to the hamlet of Les Reussilles where the Franches-Montagnes plateau starts. Afterwards, the line passes through several meadows and fields to cross the high moor and "La grande Tourbière" nature reserve. There, the line leave the Bernese Jura and enters the Canton of Jura. After the halt of La Chaux-des-Breuleux, the line reaches Les Breuleux. The line then passes through a tight right-hander and reaches the halt of Les Breuleux-Eglise, the highest point of the line. After passing through beautiful forests and pastures, the line descends on a grade of 4.4 percent to reach Le Noirmont, where the narrow-gauge line from Saignelégier enters the station from the right.

== Rolling stock ==
The following locomotives were available for the Chemin de fer Tavannes–Noirmont and its two predecessors, TT and TBN:

Class	First owner	No.	No. at CJ	Later designation	Manufacturer	Build year	Removal from service	Photo
G 2/2	TT	1		–	SLM	1884	1943	G 2/2
G 2/2	TT	2		–	SLM	1884	1940	G 2/2
G 2/2	TT	3		–	SLM	–	1943	G 2/2
Ge 2/2	TT	4		from about 1980: CJ Te 2/2 504	BBC	1913	–	Ge 2/2
Ge 2/2	TBN	5		–	BBC	1913	1954	Ge 2/2
BCe 2/4	TT	60	501	from 1953: CJ Xe 2/4 901	SWS, BBC	1913	1956	BCe 2/4
BCe 2/4	TT	61	502	–	SWS, BBC	1913	1956	BCe 2/4
BCe 2/4	TBN	70	503	from 1953: CJ Xe 2/4 903 from 1966: CJ Xe 2/4 503 from 1984: CJ BCe 2/4 70	SWS, BBC	1913	–	BCe 2/4
BCe 2/4	TBN	71	504	from 1954: CJ Xe 2/4 904 from 1959: CJ Xe 2/4 801	SWS, BBC	1913	1967	BCe 2/4
