= Le Noirmont railway station =

Railway station in Le Noirmont, Switzerland

Le Noirmont
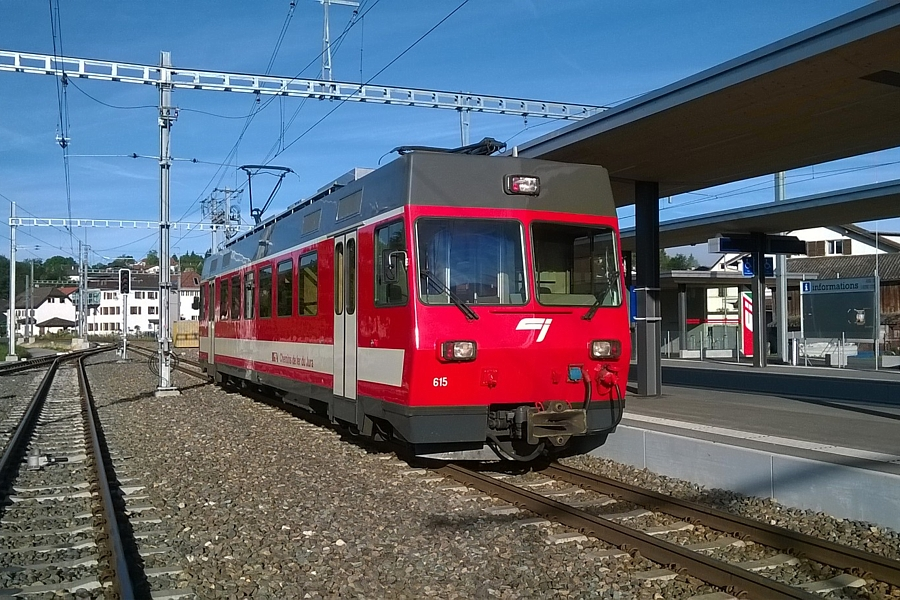
- A train at the station in 2016

General information
- Location: Le Noirmont, Jura; Switzerland
- Coordinates: 47°13′26″N 6°57′25″E
- Elevation: 969 m (3,179 ft)
- Owner: Chemins de fer du Jura
- Lines: La Chaux-de-Fonds–Glovelier line; Tavannes–Noirmont line
- Distance: 23.0 km (14.3 mi) from Tavannes
- Platforms: 3 (2 island platforms)
- Tracks: 5
- Train operators: Chemins de fer du Jura

Construction
- Accessible: Yes

Other information
- Station code: 8500174 (NOMO)
- Fare zone: 42 (Onde Verte and Vagabond)

Services
Preceding station	Chemins de fer du Jura	Following station
Le Creux-des-Biches towards La Chaux-de-Fonds	R36	Les Emibois towards Glovelier
Terminus	R37	Les Breuleux-Eglise towards Tavannes
Location
- Location within Switzerland Location within Canton of Jura

Le Noirmont railway station (French: Gare du Noirmont) is a railway station in the municipality of Le Noirmont, in the Swiss canton of Jura. It is located at the junction of the 1,000 mm (3 ft 3 3/8 in) La Chaux-de-Fonds–Glovelier and Tavannes–Noirmont lines of the Chemins de fer du Jura.

== Services ==
As of the December 2023 timetable change, the following services stop at Le Noirmont:

- Regio:
  - hourly service between La Chaux-de-Fonds and Glovelier.
  - hourly service to Tavannes.
