= Tavannes railway station =

Railway station in Tavannes, Switzerland

Tavannes
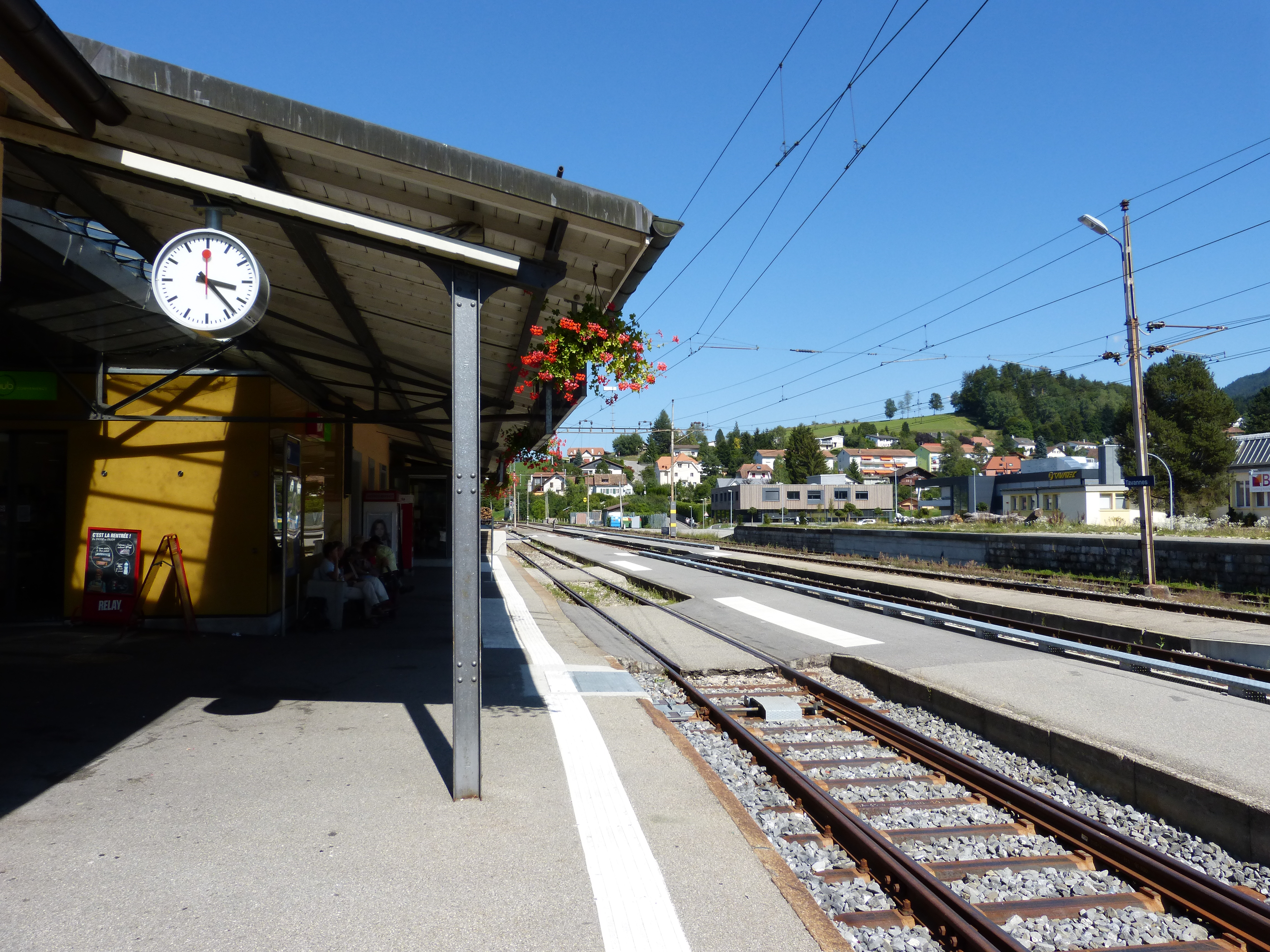
- The station platform in 2015

General information
- Location: Tavannes; Switzerland
- Coordinates: 47°13′11″N 7°12′06″E
- Elevation: 754 m (2,474 ft)
- Owner: Swiss Federal Railways
- Lines: Sonceboz-Sombeval–Moutier line; Tavannes–Noirmont line
- Distance: 55.2 km (34.3 mi) from Bern
- Platforms: 3 (3 island platforms)
- Tracks: 6
- Train operators: Chemins de fer du Jura; Swiss Federal Railways
- Connections: CarPostal SA buses

Construction
- Parking: Yes (12 spaces)
- Cycle facilities: Yes (20 spaces)
- Accessible: No

Other information
- Station code: 8500100 (TA)
- Fare zone: 341 (Libero)

Passengers
- 2023: 1'600 per weekday (SBB (excludes CJ))

Services
Preceding station	SBB CFF FFS	Following station
Reconvilier towards Malleray-Bévilard or Moutier	R42	Sonceboz-Sombeval towards Biel/Bienne
Reconvilier towards Moutier	R42	Sonceboz-Sombeval Terminus
Preceding station	Chemins de fer du Jura	Following station
Tramelan-Dessous towards Le Noirmont	R37	Terminus
Location

Tavannes railway station (French: Gare de Tavannes) is a railway station in the municipality of Tavannes, in the Swiss canton of Bern. It is located at the junction of the standard gauge Sonceboz-Sombeval–Moutier line of Swiss Federal Railways and the 1,000 mm (3 ft 3 3/8 in) gauge Tavannes–Noirmont line of Chemins de fer du Jura.

== Services ==
As of the December 2024 timetable change, the following services stop at Tavannes:

- Regio:
  - hourly service between Moutier and Biel/Bienne; increases to half-hourly on weekdays between Malleray-Bévilard and Sonceboz-Sombeval at various times during the day.
  - hourly service to Le Noirmont, additional hourly service on weekdays to Tramelan.
