= Chemins de fer du Jura =

Swiss railway company

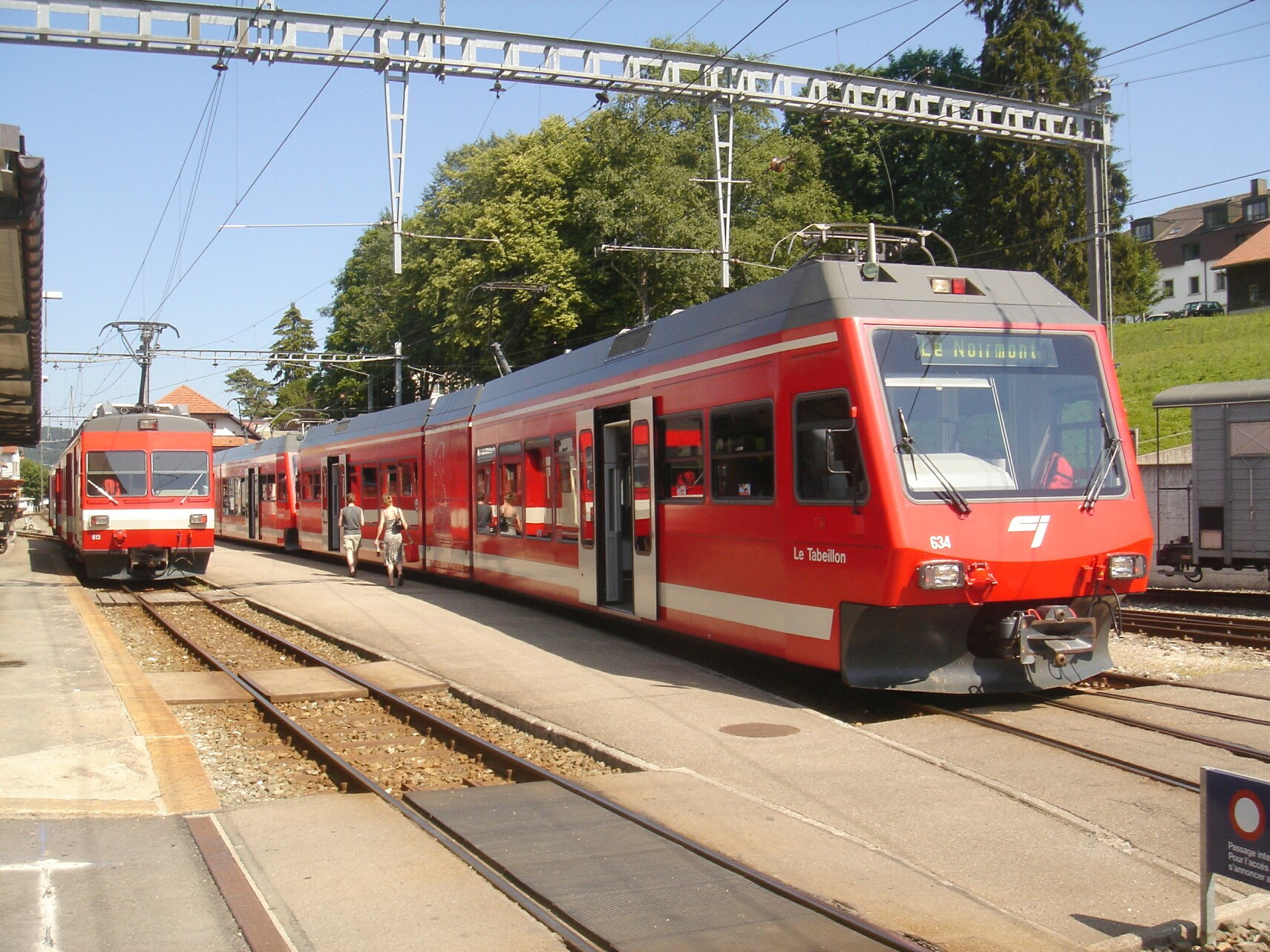

Overview
- Dates of operation: 1944–
- Predecessors: Régional Porrentruy–Bonfol; Régional Saignelégier-Glovelier; Saignelégier–La Chaux-de-Fonds Railway; Tavannes–Le Noirmont Railway

Technical
- Track gauge: 1,000 mm (3 ft 3 3/8 in) metre gauge; 1,435 mm (4 ft 8 1/2 in) standard gauge
- Electrification: 1500 V DC (metre gauge); 15 kV 16 2/3 Hz (standard gauge)
- Length: 73.8 km (45.86 mi) (metre gauge); 11 km (6.84 mi) (standard gauge)

The Chemins de fer du Jura, abbreviated to CJ, is a railway company in the canton of Jura in northwestern Switzerland. It was formed in 1944 from the merger of four independent companies connecting Porrentruy to Bonfol, Saignelégier to La Chaux-de-Fonds, Glovelier to Saignelégier and Tavannes to Tramelan and Le Noirmont. The lines extend for a total of 84.8 kilometres (52.7 mi) of which just over 73 kilometres (45 mi) is metre gauge. The 11 kilometres (6.8 mi) line from Porrentruy to Bonfol is standard gauge. The company also operates local bus services in the area.

== Operations ==
As of the December 2025 timetable change, Chemins de fer du Jura (CJ) operates the following regional railway services:

- R36: La Chaux-de-Fonds – Le Noirmont – Saignelégier – Glovelier
- R37: Le Noirmont – Les Breuleux – Tramelan – Tavannes

CJ also operates the following bus lines:

- 121: St-Imier – Chasseral
- 123: St-Imier – St-Imier, hôpital – St-Imier
- 131: Tramelan – Les Breuleux – St-Imier

== History ==
The first company to open a line in the region was the Chemin de fer Tavannes-Tramelan, which opened the 1,000 mm (3 ft 3 3/8 in) gauge line linking the villages in its name in 1884. This line was extended by the Chemin de fer Tramelan-Les Breuleux-Le Noirmont to reach Le Noirmont and was electrified in 1913. In 1927 the two companies merged to form the Chemin de fer Tavannes–Noirmont.

On 7 December 1892 the longest of the region's lines, the Chemin de fer Saignelégier-La Chaux-de-Fonds (SC) was opened linking the places in its title. The 25 km (15.5 mi) line ran from Saignelégier (Place d'Armes) to La Chaux-de-Fonds, the final kilometre being laid along the streets to the town centre.

The 1,435 mm (4 ft 8 1/2 in) gauge Porrentruy–Bonfol railway line and Saignelégier–Glovelier railway were opened in 1901 and 1904 respectively. Finally, Porrentruy–Bonfol was extended to Pfetterhouse in 1910. This extension was closed in 1970. The line between Saignelégier and Glovelier relaid to metre gauge in 1953.

Following the amalgamation of the companies in 1943, the rail system was restructured between 1946 and 1953. The complete system was electrified, some 40 years after the first electric trains had run.

== See also ==
- Rail transport in Switzerland
