= La Chaux-de-Fonds railway station =

Railway station in La Chaux-de-Fonds, Switzerland

La Chaux-de-Fonds
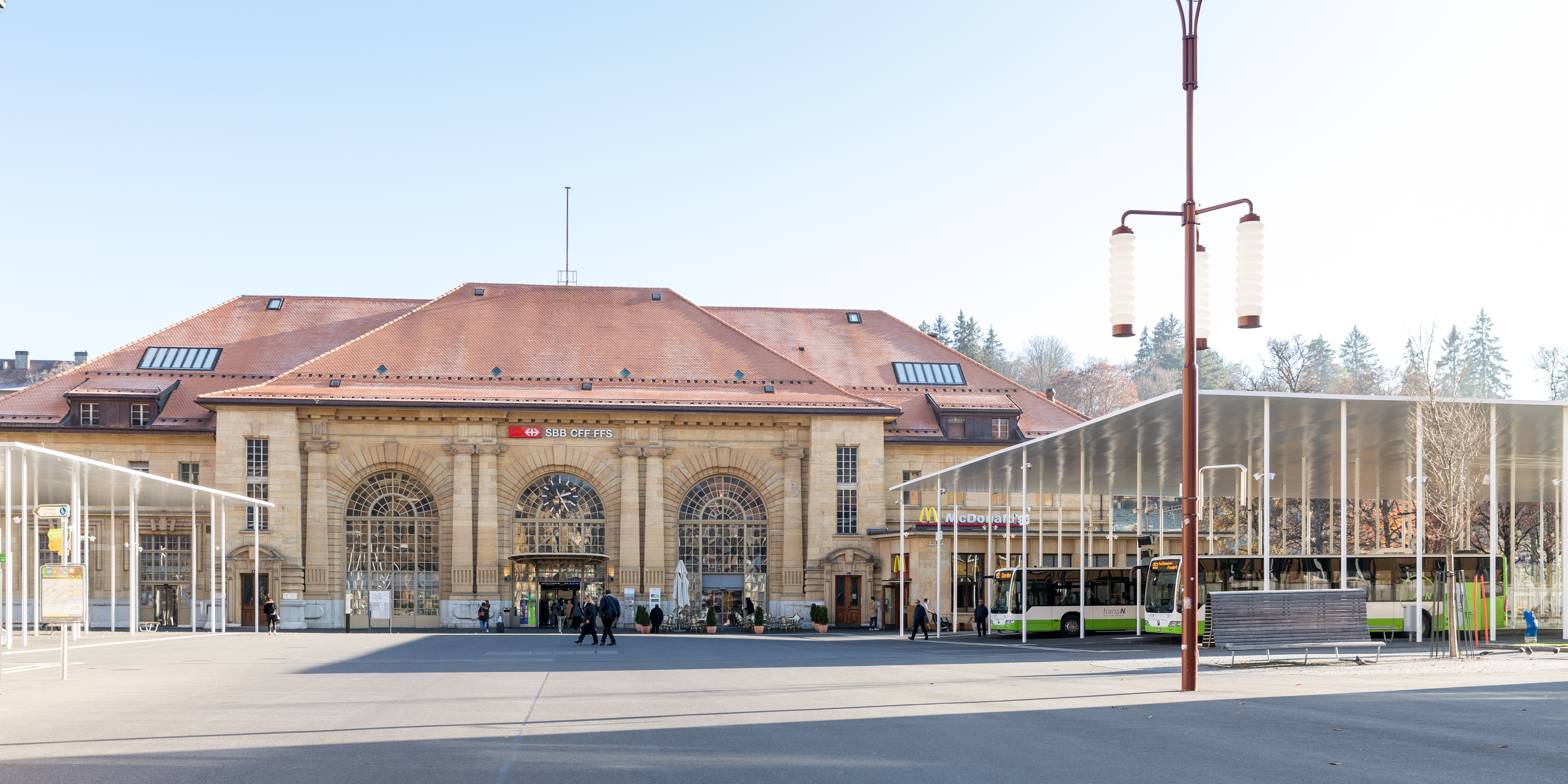
- The station building in 2018

General information
- Location: Place de la Gare; La Chaux-de-Fonds; Switzerland
- Coordinates: 47°05′55″N 6°49′34″E
- Elevation: 994 m (3,261 ft)
- Owner: Swiss Federal Railways
- Lines: Biel/Bienne–La Chaux-de-Fonds line; La Chaux-de-Fonds–Glovelier line; La Chaux-de-Fonds–Les Ponts-de-Martel line; Neuchâtel–Le Locle-Col-des-Roches line
- Distance: 29.5 km (18.3 mi) from Neuchâtel; 44.0 km (27.3 mi) from Tavannes
- Platforms: 6 (3 island platforms)
- Tracks: 6
- Train operators: BLS AG; Chemins de fer du Jura; SNCF; Swiss Federal Railways; Transports publics Neuchâtelois
- Connections: Transports publics Neuchâtelois buses

Construction
- Parking: Yes (46 spaces)
- Cycle facilities: Yes (46 spaces)
- Accessible: Partly
- Architect: Jean Béguin, Louis-Ernest Prince (1903)

Other information
- Station code: 8504314 (CF)
- Fare zone: 20 (Onde Verte)

History
- Opened: 2 July 1857

Passengers
- 2025: 10,200 per day (BLS, SBB (excludes CJ and transN))
- Rank: 74 out of 1,095

Services
Preceding station	SBB CFF FFS	Following station
Terminus	RE4	St-Imier towards Biel/Bienne
through to R20	RE6	Les Hauts-Geneveys towards Neuchâtel
La Chaux-de-Fonds Les Forges towards Le Locle	R20	through to RE6
La Chaux-de-Fonds Les Forges towards Le Locle	R20	Terminus
Terminus	R41	Renan BE towards Biel/Bienne
Preceding station	BLS	Following station
Terminus	IR 66	Les Hauts-Geneveys towards Bern
Preceding station	TER Bourgogne-Franche-Comté	Following station
La Chaux-de-Fonds Les Forges towards Besançon	TER	Terminus
Preceding station	Chemins de fer du Jura	Following station
Terminus	R36	La Chaux-de-Fonds-Est towards Glovelier
Preceding station	Transports publics Neuchâtelois	Following station
La Chaux-de-Fonds-Grenier towards Les Ponts-de-Martel	R22	Terminus
Location
- Location within Switzerland Location within Canton of Neuchâtel

La Chaux-de-Fonds railway station (French: Gare de La Chaux-de-Fonds) serves the municipality of La Chaux-de-Fonds, in the canton of Neuchâtel, Switzerland.

Opened in 1857, the station is owned and operated by SBB-CFF-FFS. It forms the junction between three SBB-CFF-FFS standard gauge lines: from Morteau in France (via Le Locle-Col des Roches), from Neuchâtel and from Biel/Bienne.

The station also offers interchange with two metre gauge lines: the Chemins de fer du Jura (CJ) line to Glovelier and the Transports publics Neuchâtelois line to Les Ponts-de-Martel.

== History ==
The station was opened on 2 July 1857, together with the rest of the initial, 7 km (4.3 mi) long, La-Chaux-de-Fonds–Le Lochle section of the La Chaux-de-Fonds–Neuchâtel railway. This railway was constructed by the Compagnie du Jura industriel, to link the watchmaking industry in the Watch Valley of the Neuchâtel Jura with the cantonal capital of Neuchâtel.

== Location ==
La Chaux-de-Fonds railway station is situated at Place de la Gare, right in the centre of the city.

== Services ==
As of the December 2024 timetable change, the following services stop at La Chaux-de-Fonds:

- InterRegio/RegioExpress: half-hourly service to Neuchâtel and hourly service to Bern.
- RegioExpress/Regio:
  - two trains per hour to Le Locle.
  - two trains per hour to Biel/Bienne.
- TER: infrequent service to Morteau or Besançon-Viotte.
- Regio:
  - hourly service to Glovelier.
  - hourly service to Les Ponts-de-Martel.

== See also ==
- History of rail transport in Switzerland
- Rail transport in Switzerland
