= Saulcy, Switzerland =

Saulcy
- Municipality
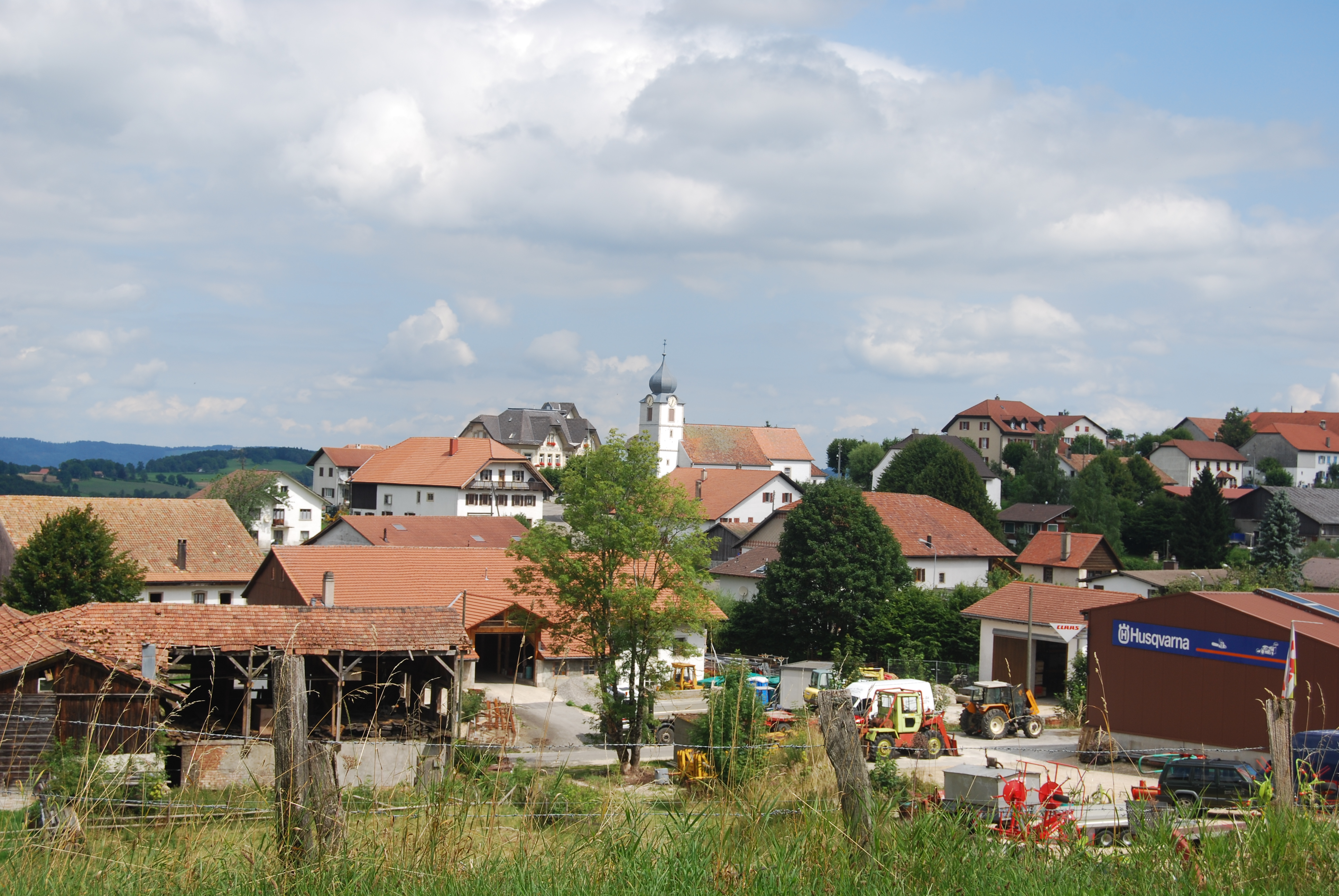
- Saulcy village

- Coat of arms
- Location of Saulcy
- Location within Switzerland Location within Canton of Jura
- Coordinates: 47°18′N 07°09′E
- Country: Switzerland
- Canton: Jura
- District: Delémont

Government
  - Executive: Conseil communal with 5 members
  - Mayor: Maire; Christophe Wermeille (as of 2026)

Area
  - Total: 7.89 km^{2} (3.05 sq mi)
- Elevation: 910 m (2,990 ft)

Population (2020)
  - Total: 255
  - Density: 32.3/km^{2} (83.7/sq mi)
- Time zone: UTC+01:00 (CET)
  - Summer (DST): UTC+02:00 (CEST)
- Postal code: 2873
- SFOS number: 6722
- ISO 3166 code: CH-JU
- Surrounded by: Lajoux, Saint-Brais, Haute-Sorne, Rebévelier(BE)
- Website: www.saulcy.ch

Saulcy (French pronunciation: [so(l)si]; Frainc-Comtou: Sâci) is a municipality in the district of Delémont in the canton of Jura in Switzerland.

== History ==
Aerial view (1955)

Saulcy is first mentioned in 1327 as Sacis.

== Geography ==
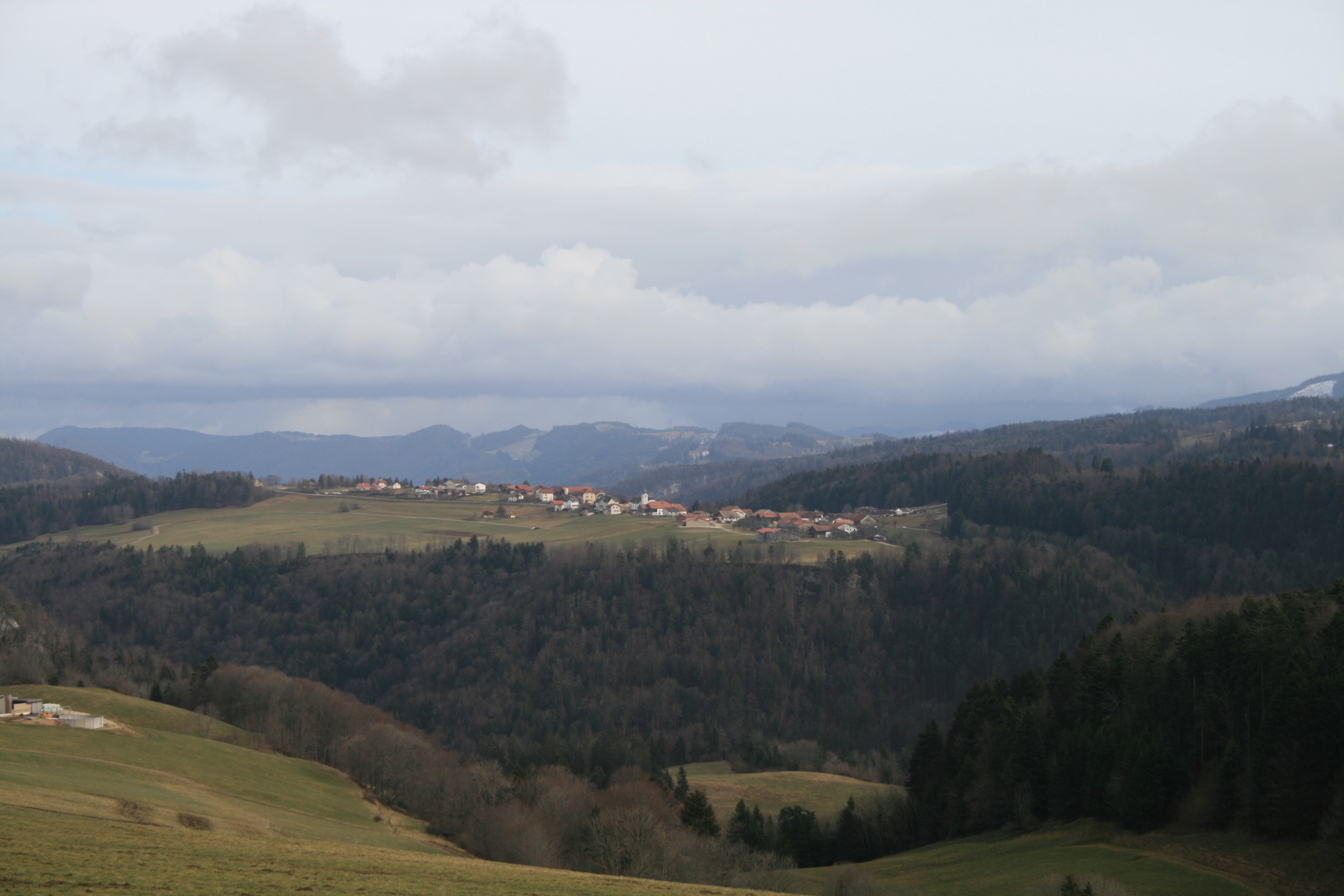
Saulcy

Saulcy has an area of 7.86 km^{2} (3.03 sq mi). Of this area, 3.67 km^{2} (1.42 mi^{2}) or 46.7% is used for agricultural purposes, while 3.98 km^{2} (1.54 mi^{2}) or 50.6% is forested. Of the rest of the land, 0.26 km^{2} (0.10 mi^{2}) or 3.3% is settled (buildings or roads).

Of the built up area, housing and buildings made up 1.7% and transportation infrastructure made up 1.7%. Out of the forested land, 46.8% of the total land area is heavily forested and 3.8% is covered with orchards or small clusters of trees. Of the agricultural land, 6.9% is used for growing crops and 22.8% is pastures and 16.8% is used for alpine pastures.

The municipality is located in the Delemont district. It consists of the village of Saulcy and the hamlet of La Racine.

The municipalities of Bassecourt, Boécourt, Courfaivre, Glovelier, Saulcy, Soulce and Undervelier are considering a merger on at a date in the future into the new municipality of Haute-Sorne.

== Coat of arms ==
The blazon of the municipal coat of arms is Or on a Base Vert a Ram Sable passant attired, langued and hoofed Gules, in front of a Willow of the second.

== Demographics ==
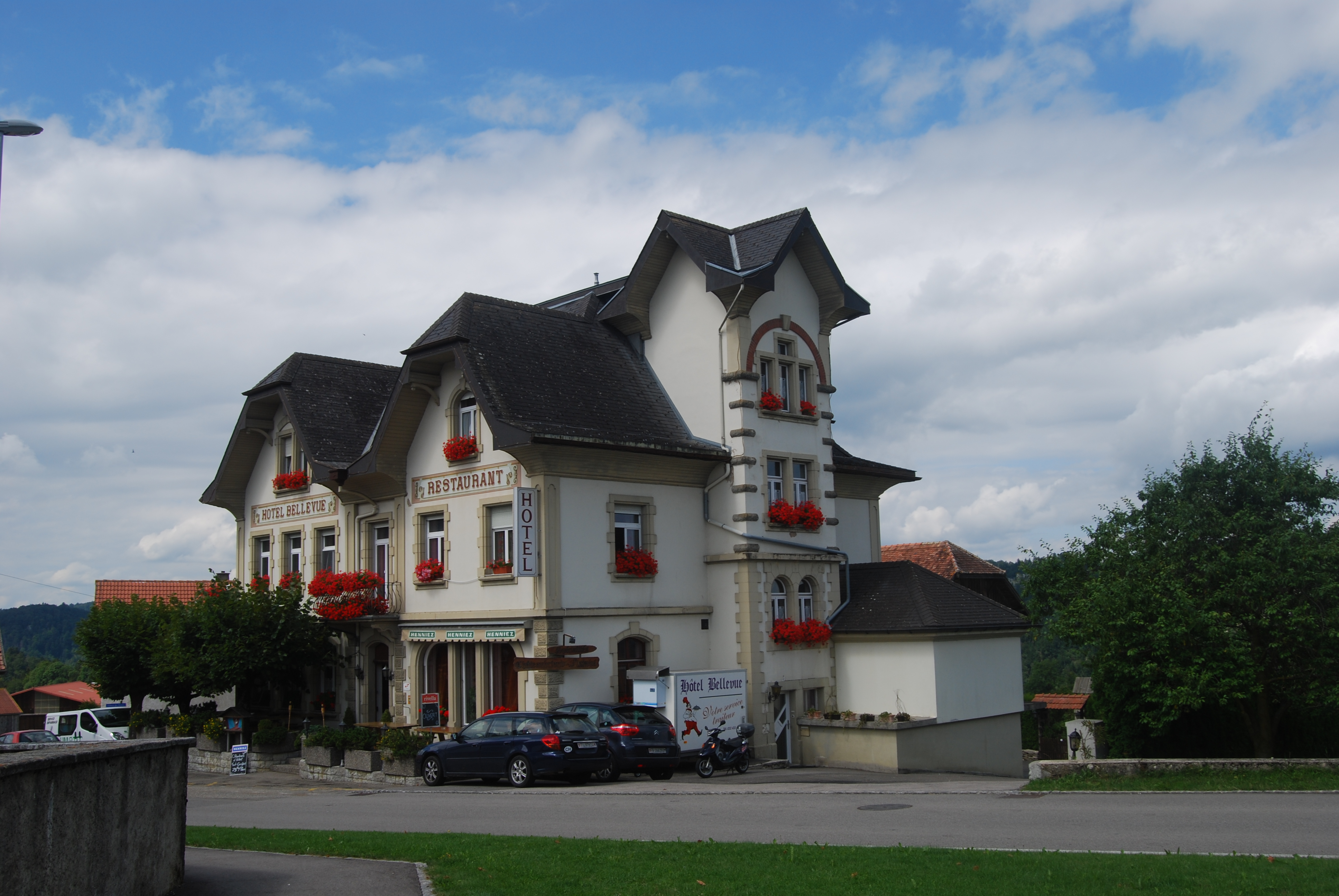
Hotel Bellevue in Saulcy

Saulcy has a population (as of December 2020) of 255. As of 2008, 2.0% of the population were resident foreign nationals. Over the ten years 2000–2010 the population fell by 5.9%. Net migration contributed −7%; births and deaths +1.1%.

Most of the population (as of 2000) speaks French (256 or 97.0%) as their first language, German is the second most common (7 or 2.7%) and Portuguese is the third (1 or 0.4%).

As of 2008, the population was 47.8% male and 52.2% female. The population was made up of 116 Swiss men (45.5% of the population) and 6 (2.4%) non-Swiss men. There were 132 Swiss women (51.8%) and 1 (0.4%) non-Swiss women. Of the population in the municipality, 153 or about 58.0% were born in Saulcy who lived there in 2000. There were 72 or 27.3% who were born in the same canton, while 18 or 6.8% were born somewhere else in Switzerland, and 15 or 5.7% were born outside of Switzerland.

As of 2000, children and teenagers (0–19 years old) make up 31.8% of the population, while adults (20–64 years old) make up 50% and seniors (over 64 years old) make up 18.2%.

As of 2000, there were 119 people who were single (and never married) in the municipality. There were 133 married people, 8 widows or widowers and 4 divorcees.

As of 2000, there were 94 private households in the municipality, and an average of 2.8 persons per household. There were 23 households that consist of only one person and 18 households with five or more people. In 2000, a total of 90 apartments (81.8% of the total) were permanently occupied, while 14 apartments (12.7%) were seasonally occupied and 6 apartments (5.5%) were empty. As of 2009, the construction rate of new housing units was 7.8 new units per 1000 residents. The vacancy rate for the municipality, in 2010, was 3.48%.

The historical population is given in the following chart:

== Politics ==
In the 2007 federal election the most popular party was the CVP which received 35.47% of the vote. The next three most popular parties were the SPS (30.23%), the CSP (16.86%) and the SVP (12.79%). In the federal election, a total of 89 votes were cast, and the voter turnout was 44.3%.

== Economy ==
As of 2010, Saulcy had an unemployment rate of 3.3%. As of 2008, there were 30 people employed in the primary economic sector and about 12 businesses involved in this sector. 23 people were employed in the secondary sector and there were 3 businesses in this sector. 23 people were employed in the tertiary sector, with 5 businesses in this sector. There were 110 residents of the municipality who were employed in some capacity, of which females made up 44.5% of the workforce.

In 2008 the total number of full-time equivalent jobs was 60. The number of jobs in the primary sector was 22, all of which were in agriculture. The number of jobs in the secondary sector was 22, all of which were in construction. The number of jobs in the tertiary sector was 16. In the tertiary sector; 7 or 43.8% were in wholesale or retail sales or the repair of motor vehicles, 6 or 37.5% were in a hotel or restaurant, 2 or 12.5% were in education.

In 2000, there were 28 workers who commuted into the municipality and 70 workers who commuted away. The municipality is a net exporter of workers, with about 2.5 workers leaving the municipality for every one entering. Of the working population, 5.5% used public transportation to get to work, and 68.2% used a private car.

== Religion ==
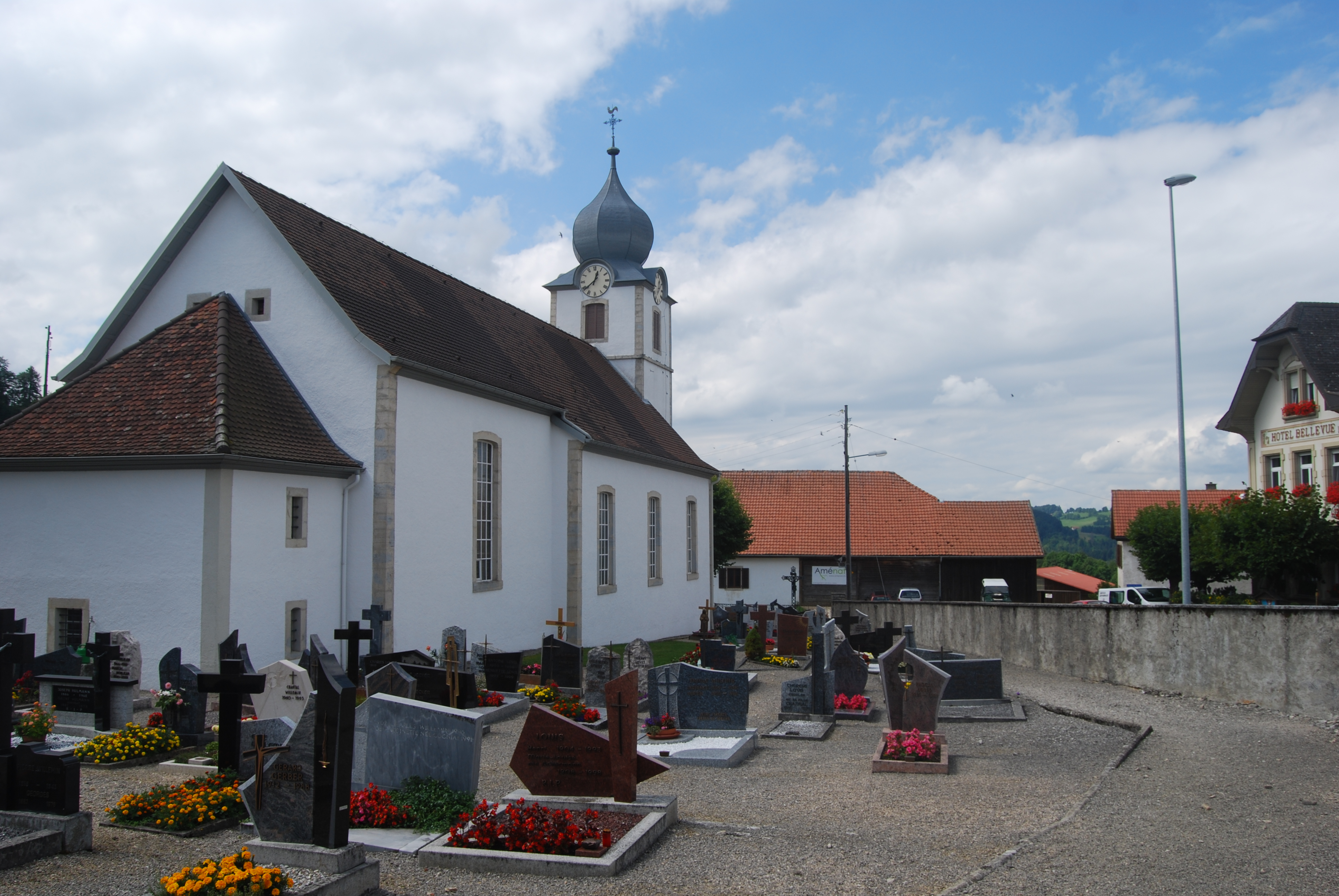
Saulcy village church

From the 2000 census, 237 or 89.8% were Roman Catholic, while 9 or 3.4% belonged to the Swiss Reformed Church. Of the rest of the population, there were 18 individuals (or about 6.82% of the population) who belonged to another Christian church. There was 1 individual who was Islamic. 6 (or about 2.27% of the population) belonged to no church, are agnostic or atheist, and 2 individuals (or about 0.76% of the population) did not answer the question.

== Education ==
In Saulcy about 86 or (32.6%) of the population have completed non-mandatory upper secondary education, and 14 or (5.3%) have completed additional higher education (either university or a Fachhochschule). Of the 14 who completed tertiary schooling, 57.1% were Swiss men, 35.7% were Swiss women.

The Canton of Jura school system provides two year of non-obligatory Kindergarten, followed by six years of Primary school. This is followed by three years of obligatory lower Secondary school where the students are separated according to ability and aptitude. Following the lower Secondary students may attend a three or four year optional upper Secondary school followed by some form of Tertiary school or they may enter an apprenticeship.

During the 2009-10 school year, there were a total of 19 students attending 2 classes in Saulcy. There were no kindergarten classes in the municipality. The municipality had 2 primary classes and 19 students. There are only nine Secondary schools in the canton, so all the students from Saulcy attend their secondary school in another municipality.

As of 2000, there were 29 students from Saulcy who attended schools outside the municipality.
