= Boécourt =

- Municipality
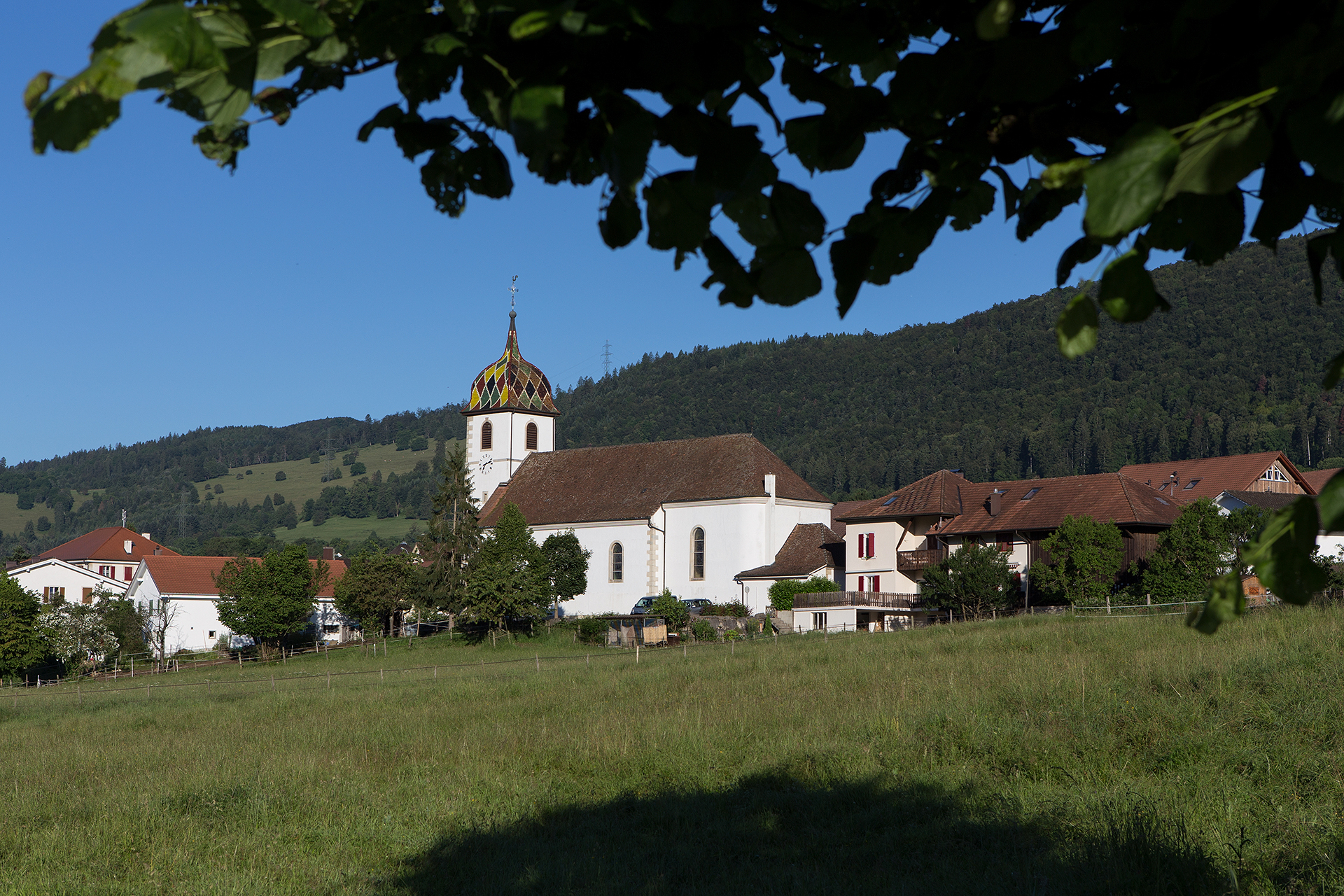

- Flag Coat of arms
- Location of Boécourt
- Location within Switzerland Location within Canton of Jura
- Coordinates: 47°21′N 7°13′E
- Country: Switzerland
- Canton: Jura
- District: Delémont

Government
  - Executive: Conseil communal with 5 members
  - Mayor: Maire; Thierry Bourquard (as of 2026)

Area
  - Total: 12.28 km^{2} (4.74 sq mi)
- Elevation: 516 m (1,693 ft)

Population (December 2004)
  - Total: 837
  - Density: 68.2/km^{2} (177/sq mi)
- Time zone: UTC+01:00 (CET)
  - Summer (DST): UTC+02:00 (CEST)
- Postal code: 2856
- SFOS number: 6702
- ISO 3166 code: CH-JU
- Surrounded by: Asuel, Bassecourt, Bourrignon, Develier, Glovelier, Montmelon
- Twin towns: Périgny-sur-Yerres (France)
- Website: https://www.boecourt.ch/

Boécourt (Frainc-Comtou: Boéco) is a municipality in the district of Delémont in the canton of Jura in Switzerland.

== History ==
Boécourt is first mentioned in 1141 as Boescort. The municipality was formerly known by its German name Biestingen, however, that name is no longer used.

== Geography ==
Boécourt has an area of 12.35 km^{2} (4.77 sq mi). Of this area, 6.09 km^{2} (2.35 mi^{2}) or 49.3% is used for agricultural purposes, while 5.09 km^{2} (1.97 mi^{2}) or 41.2% is forested. Of the rest of the land, 1.06 km^{2} (0.41 mi^{2}) or 8.6% is settled (buildings or roads), 0.04 km^{2} (9.9 acres) or 0.3% is either rivers or lakes and 0.03 km^{2} (7.4 acres) or 0.2% is unproductive land.

Of the built up area, housing and buildings made up 3.2% and transportation infrastructure made up 3.9%. Out of the forested land, 38.4% of the total land area is heavily forested and 2.8% is covered with orchards or small clusters of trees. Of the agricultural land, 18.0% is used for growing crops and 17.4% is pastures and 13.2% is used for alpine pastures. All the water in the municipality is in lakes.

The municipality is located in the Delemont district, south of the Les Rangiers junction on the Glovelier-Porrentruy road. It consists of the villages of Boécourt, Séprais and Montavon.

The municipalities of Bassecourt, Boécourt, Courfaivre, Glovelier, Saulcy, Soulce and Undervelier are considering a merger on at a date in the future into the new municipality of Haute-Sorne.

== Coat of arms ==
The blazon of the municipal coat of arms is Azure, a Garb Or ribboned and arched with three Mullets [of Six] of the same.

== Demographics ==
Boécourt has a population (as of December 2020) of 923. As of 2008, 9.4% of the population are resident foreign nationals. Over the last 10 years (2000–2010) the population has changed at a rate of 1.4%. Migration accounted for 1.8%, while births and deaths accounted for -0.4%.

Most of the population (as of 2000) speaks French (744 or 91.4%) as their first language, German is the second most common (32 or 3.9%) and Italian is the third (16 or 2.0%). There are 3 people who speak Romansh.

As of 2008, the population was 49.9% male and 50.1% female. The population was made up of 387 Swiss men (45.2% of the population) and 40 (4.7%) non-Swiss men. There were 390 Swiss women (45.6%) and 39 (4.6%) non-Swiss women. Of the population in the municipality, 330 or about 40.5% were born in Boécourt and lived there in 2000. There were 264 or 32.4% who were born in the same canton, while 107 or 13.1% were born somewhere else in Switzerland, and 94 or 11.5% were born outside of Switzerland.

As of 2000, children and teenagers (0–19 years old) make up 27.1% of the population, while adults (20–64 years old) make up 58.5% and seniors (over 64 years old) make up 14.4%.

As of 2000, there were 328 people who were single and never married in the municipality. There were 425 married individuals, 34 widows or widowers and 27 individuals who are divorced.

As of 2000, there were 308 private households in the municipality, and an average of 2.6 persons per household. There were 66 households that consist of only one person and 29 households with five or more people. In 2000, a total of 303 apartments (86.3% of the total) were permanently occupied, while 36 apartments (10.3%) were seasonally occupied and 12 apartments (3.4%) were empty. As of 2009, the construction rate of new housing units was 4.7 new units per 1000 residents. The vacancy rate for the municipality, in 2010, was 2.07%.

The historical population is given in the following chart:

== Politics ==
In the 2007 federal election the most popular party was the SPS which received 29.12% of the vote. The next three most popular parties were the CVP (24.83%), the SVP (17.61%) and the FDP (17.38%). In the federal election, a total of 227 votes were cast, and the voter turnout was 38.0%.

== Economy ==
Areal view of Boécourt, 1955, from the archives of ETH Zurich

As of 2010, Boécourt had an unemployment rate of 3.9%. As of 2008, there were 38 people employed in the primary economic sector and about 15 businesses involved in this sector. 337 people were employed in the secondary sector and there were 13 businesses in this sector. 59 people were employed in the tertiary sector, with 17 businesses in this sector. There were 403 residents of the municipality who were employed in some capacity, of which females made up 40.0% of the workforce.

In 2008 the total number of full-time equivalent jobs was 383. The number of jobs in the primary sector was 26, all of which were in agriculture. The number of jobs in the secondary sector was 324 of which 290 or (89.5%) were in manufacturing and 32 (9.9%) were in construction. The number of jobs in the tertiary sector was 33. In the tertiary sector; 5 or 15.2% were in wholesale or retail sales or the repair of motor vehicles, 2 or 6.1% were in the movement and storage of goods, 7 or 21.2% were in a hotel or restaurant, 2 or 6.1% were technical professionals or scientists, 7 or 21.2% were in education.

In 2000, there were 309 workers who commuted into the municipality and 249 workers who commuted away. The municipality is a net importer of workers, with about 1.2 workers entering the municipality for every one leaving. About 19.4% of the workforce coming into Boécourt are coming from outside Switzerland. Of the working population, 7.7% used public transportation to get to work, and 63% used a private car.

== Religion ==
From the 2000 census, 641 or 78.7% were Roman Catholic, while 61 or 7.5% belonged to the Swiss Reformed Church. Of the rest of the population, there were 33 individuals (or about 4.05% of the population) who belonged to another Christian church. There was 1 individual who was Islamic. 72 (or about 8.85% of the population) belonged to no church, are agnostic or atheist, and 22 individuals (or about 2.70% of the population) did not answer the question.

== Education ==
In Boécourt about 242 or (29.7%) of the population have completed non-mandatory upper secondary education, and 69 or (8.5%) have completed additional higher education (either university or a Fachhochschule). Of the 69 who completed tertiary schooling, 60.9% were Swiss men, 29.0% were Swiss women.

The Canton of Jura school system provides two year of non-obligatory Kindergarten, followed by six years of Primary school. This is followed by three years of obligatory lower Secondary school where the students are separated according to ability and aptitude. Following the lower Secondary students may attend a three or four year optional upper Secondary school followed by some form of Tertiary school or they may enter an apprenticeship.

During the 2009-10 school year, there were no students attending school in Boécourt. As of 2000, there were 71 students from Boécourt who attended schools outside the municipality.
