= Develier =

- Municipality
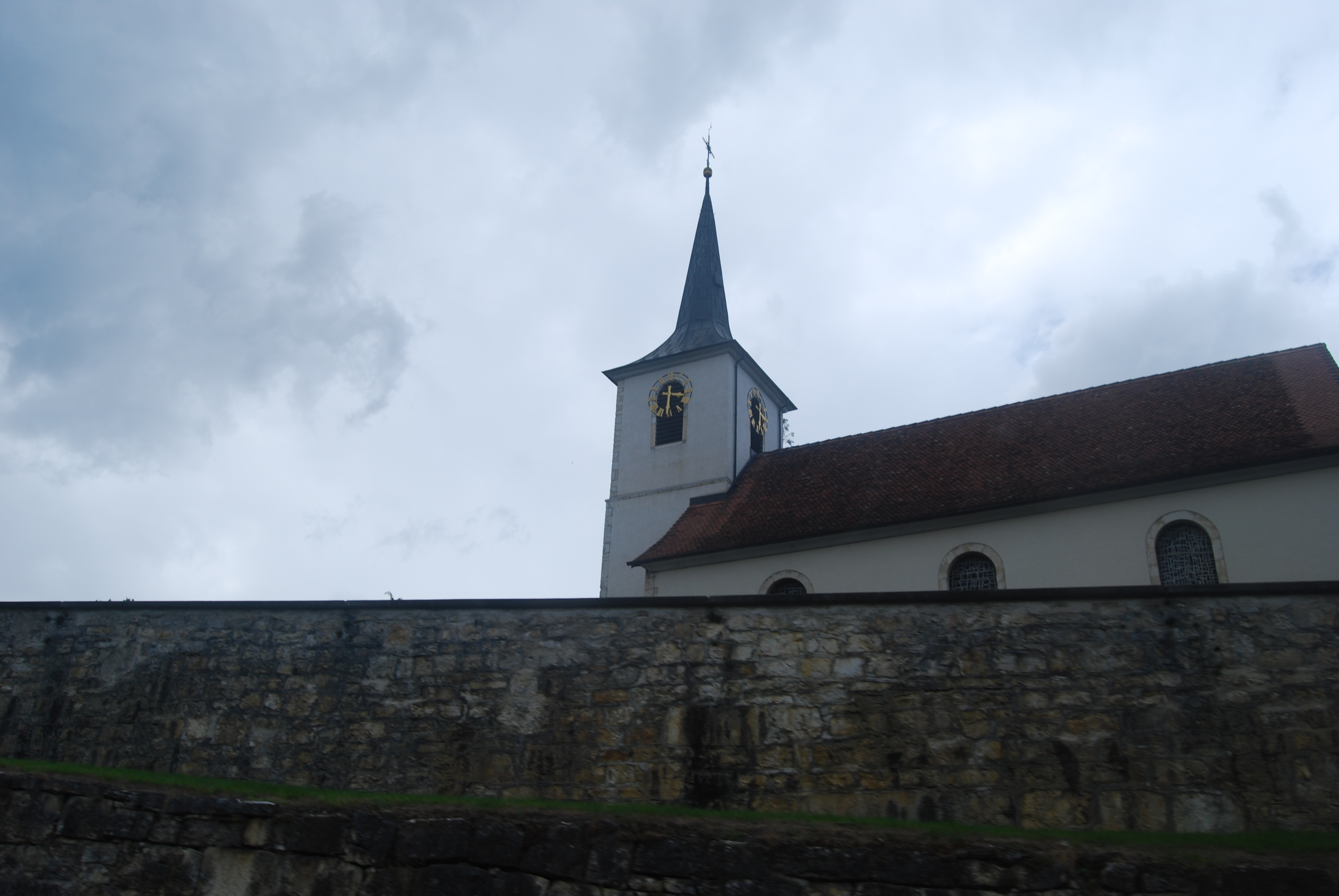
- Develier village church

- Flag Coat of arms
- Location of Develier
- Location within Switzerland Location within Canton of Jura
- Coordinates: 47°21′N 07°17′E
- Country: Switzerland
- Canton: Jura
- District: Delémont

Government
  - Executive: Conseil communal with 5 members
  - Mayor: Maire; Gabriel Chappuis (as of 2026)

Area
  - Total: 12.42 km^{2} (4.80 sq mi)
- Elevation: 477 m (1,565 ft)

Population (2003)
  - Total: 1,334
  - Density: 107.4/km^{2} (278.2/sq mi)
- Time zone: UTC+01:00 (CET)
  - Summer (DST): UTC+02:00 (CEST)
- Postal code: 2802
- SFOS number: 6712
- ISO 3166 code: CH-JU
- Surrounded by: Bassecourt, Courfaivre, Courtételle, Delémont, Bourrignon, Boécourt
- Website: www.develier.ch

Develier is a municipality in the district of Delémont in the canton of Jura in Switzerland.

== History ==
Develier is first mentioned in 1139 as Divilier.

== Geography ==
Aerial view (1953)

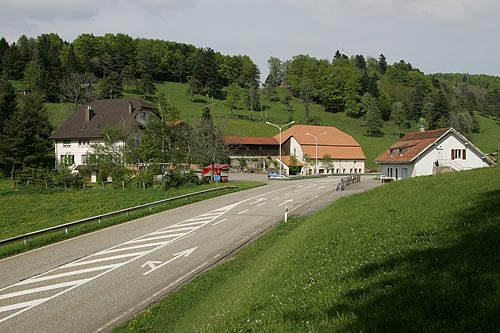
Les Rangier pass

Develier has an area of 12.47 km^{2} (4.81 sq mi). Of this area, 5.91 km^{2} (2.28 mi^{2}) or 47.4% is used for agricultural purposes, while 5.39 km^{2} (2.08 mi^{2}) or 43.2% is forested. Of the rest of the land, 1.11 km^{2} (0.43 mi^{2}) or 8.9% is settled (buildings or roads), 0.02 km^{2} (4.9 acres) or 0.2% is either rivers or lakes and 0.03 km^{2} (7.4 acres) or 0.2% is unproductive land.

Of the built up area, housing and buildings made up 3.9% and transportation infrastructure made up 3.8%. Out of the forested land, 40.6% of the total land area is heavily forested and 2.6% is covered with orchards or small clusters of trees. Of the agricultural land, 22.8% is used for growing crops and 14.9% is pastures and 8.9% is used for alpine pastures. All the water in the municipality is flowing water.

The municipality is located in the Delemont district, on the Delemont-Porrentruy road which runs over the Les Rangiers pass. It consists of the village of Develier and the hamlet of Develier-Dessus.

== Coat of arms ==
The blazon of the municipal coat of arms is Gules, a Semi Lion rampant Or langued Argent issuant from Coupeaux of six of the last.

== Demographics ==
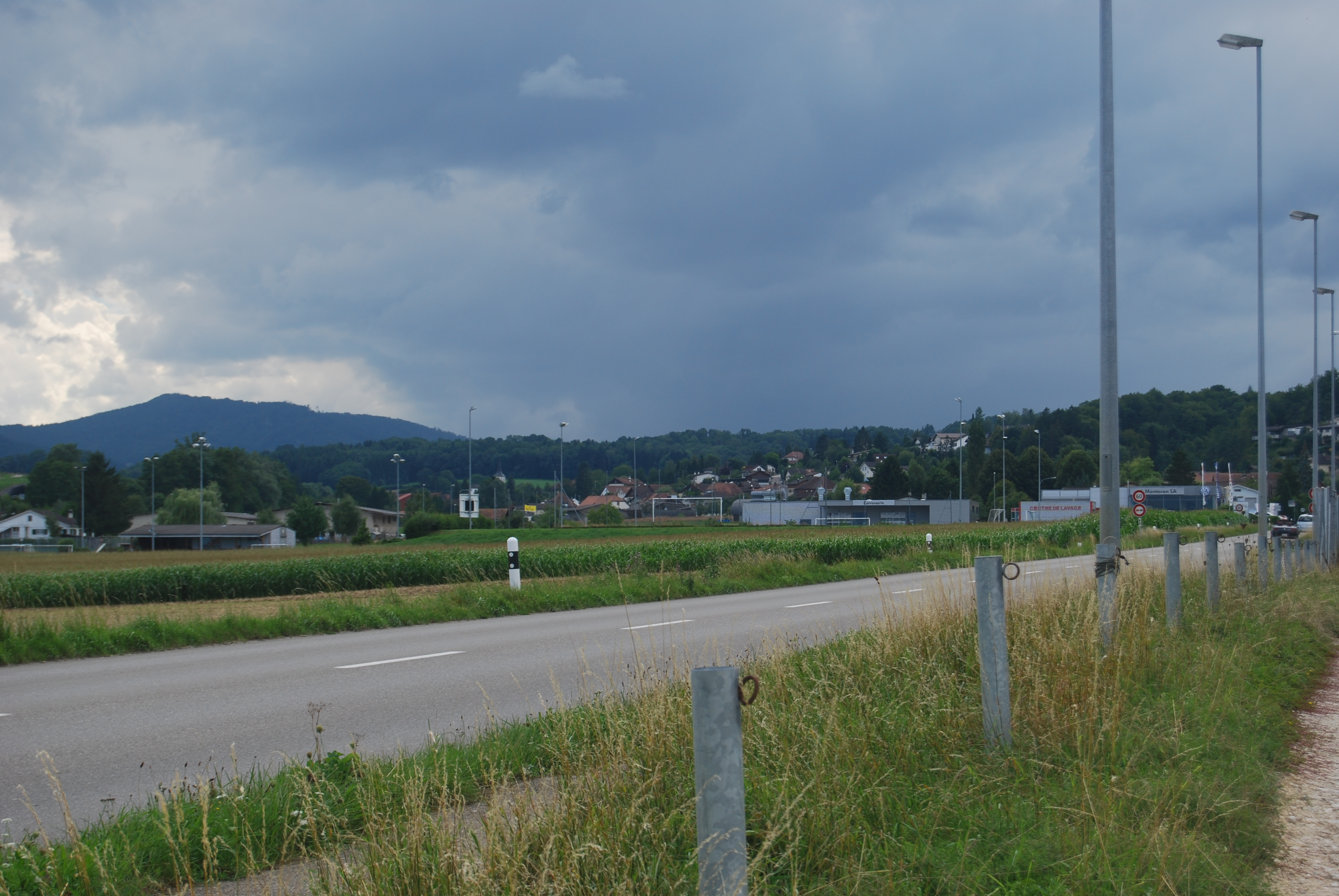
Develier village

Develier has a population (as of December 2020) of 1,371. As of 2008, 10.8% of the population are resident foreign nationals. Over the last 10 years (2000–2010) the population has changed at a rate of 7.3%. Migration accounted for 3.7%, while births and deaths accounted for 2.8%.

Most of the population (as of 2000) speaks French (1,175 or 93.8%) as their first language, German is the second most common (33 or 2.6%) and Italian is the third (15 or 1.2%).

As of 2008, the population was 49.3% male and 50.7% female. The population was made up of 589 Swiss men (43.7% of the population) and 75 (5.6%) non-Swiss men. There were 616 Swiss women (45.7%) and 67 (5.0%) non-Swiss women. Of the population in the municipality, 477 or about 38.1% were born in Develier and lived there in 2000. There were 442 or 35.3% who were born in the same canton, while 154 or 12.3% were born somewhere else in Switzerland, and 147 or 11.7% were born outside of Switzerland.

As of 2000, children and teenagers (0–19 years old) make up 27.2% of the population, while adults (20–64 years old) make up 60.8% and seniors (over 64 years old) make up 12%.

As of 2000, there were 529 people who were single and never married in the municipality. There were 629 married individuals, 51 widows or widowers and 44 individuals who are divorced.

As of 2000, there were 462 private households in the municipality, and an average of 2.6 persons per household. There were 110 households that consist of only one person and 47 households with five or more people. In 2000, a total of 450 apartments (94.3% of the total) were permanently occupied, while 20 apartments (4.2%) were seasonally occupied and 7 apartments (1.5%) were empty. As of 2009, the construction rate of new housing units was 5.2 new units per 1000 residents. The vacancy rate for the municipality, in 2010, was 2.06%.

The historical population is given in the following chart:

== Politics ==
In the 2007 federal election the most popular party was the SPS which received 34.79% of the vote. The next three most popular parties were the CVP (24.15%), the CSP (17.74%) and the FDP (13.64%). In the federal election, a total of 374 votes were cast, and the voter turnout was 41.8%.

== Economy ==
As of 2010, Develier had an unemployment rate of 5.2%. As of 2008, there were 60 people employed in the primary economic sector and about 20 businesses involved in this sector. 168 people were employed in the secondary sector and there were 28 businesses in this sector. 178 people were employed in the tertiary sector, with 32 businesses in this sector. There were 622 residents of the municipality who were employed in some capacity, of which females made up 43.4% of the workforce.

In 2008 the total number of full-time equivalent jobs was 337. The number of jobs in the primary sector was 38, all of which were in agriculture. The number of jobs in the secondary sector was 151 of which 143 or (94.7%) were in manufacturing and 7 (4.6%) were in construction. The number of jobs in the tertiary sector was 148. In the tertiary sector; 93 or 62.8% were in wholesale or retail sales or the repair of motor vehicles, 12 or 8.1% were in the movement and storage of goods, 9 or 6.1% were in a hotel or restaurant, 3 or 2.0% were technical professionals or scientists, 16 or 10.8% were in education.

In 2000, there were 135 workers who commuted into the municipality and 427 workers who commuted away. The municipality is a net exporter of workers, with about 3.2 workers leaving the municipality for every one entering. About 7.4% of the workforce coming into Develier are coming from outside Switzerland. Of the working population, 9% used public transportation to get to work, and 66.7% used a private car.

== Religion ==
From the 2000 census, 944 or 75.3% were Roman Catholic, while 159 or 12.7% belonged to the Swiss Reformed Church. Of the rest of the population, there was 1 member of an Orthodox church, and there were 38 individuals (or about 3.03% of the population) who belonged to another Christian church. There were 19 (or about 1.52% of the population) who were Islamic. There were 4 individuals who were Buddhist. 60 (or about 4.79% of the population) belonged to no church, are agnostic or atheist, and 47 individuals (or about 3.75% of the population) did not answer the question.

== Education ==
In Develier about 447 or (35.7%) of the population have completed non-mandatory upper secondary education, and 119 or (9.5%) have completed additional higher education (either university or a Fachhochschule). Of the 119 who completed tertiary schooling, 63.0% were Swiss men, 22.7% were Swiss women, 8.4% were non-Swiss men and 5.9% were non-Swiss women.

The Canton of Jura school system provides two year of non-obligatory Kindergarten, followed by six years of Primary school. This is followed by three years of obligatory lower Secondary school where the students are separated according to ability and aptitude. Following the lower Secondary students may attend a three or four year optional upper Secondary school followed by some form of Tertiary school or they may enter an apprenticeship.

During the 2009-10 school year, there were a total of 130 students attending 8 classes in Develier. There were 2 kindergarten classes with a total of 28 students in the municipality. The municipality had 6 primary classes and 102 students. There are only nine Secondary schools in the canton, so all the students from Develier attend their secondary school in another municipality.

As of 2000, there were 2 students in Develier who came from another municipality, while 83 residents attended schools outside the municipality.
