= Perrefitte =

- Municipality
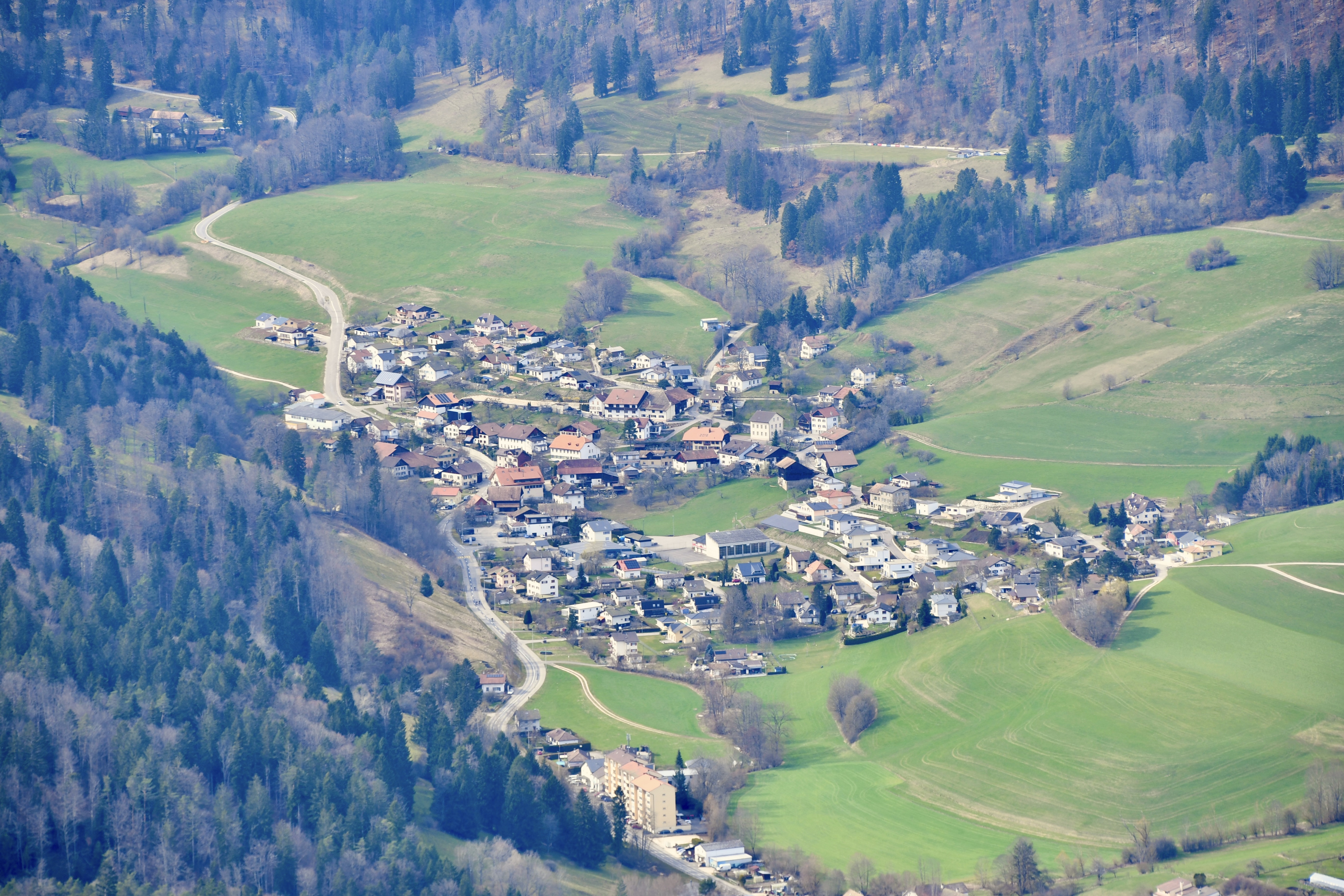

- Flag Coat of arms
- Location of Perrefitte
- Location within Switzerland Location within Canton of Bern
- Coordinates: 47°17′N 7°21′E
- Country: Switzerland
- Canton: Bern
- District: Jura bernois

Government
  - Mayor: Maire; Virginie Heyer FDP/PLR (as of 2026)

Area
  - Total: 8.67 km^{2} (3.35 sq mi)
- Elevation: 600 m (2,000 ft)

Population (Dec 2011)
  - Total: 464
  - Density: 53.5/km^{2} (139/sq mi)
- Time zone: UTC+01:00 (CET)
  - Summer (DST): UTC+02:00 (CEST)
- Postal code: 2742
- SFOS number: 701
- ISO 3166 code: CH-BE
- Surrounded by: Moutier, Champoz, Souboz, Soulce
- Website: perrefitte.ch

Perrefitte (French pronunciation: [pɛʁfit]) is a municipality in the administrative district of Jura bernois in the canton of Bern in Switzerland. It is located in the French-speaking Bernese Jura (Jura Bernois). Its old German names Beffert and Pfeffert are no longer in use today.

== History ==
Aerial view (1958)

Perrefitte is first mentioned in 1295 as Pierefite. In 1321 appears the Perefiten terminology, then followed by Pierefetteau, and in 1548 Pierrefette. This name is derived from the Latin “petra ficta”. The village remains incorporated to the Moutier-Grandval community until the end of the 18th century. From 1797 to 1815, Perrefitte belongs to France, within the French Department of Mont-Terrible.

As from 1800, it becomes a part of the Haut-Rhin Department, to which the department of Mont-Terrible was attached.

By decision of the congress of Vienna, the territory of the old Basel diocese was allotted to canton of Bern, in 1815.

== Geography ==
Perrefitte is located at 600 meters of altitude. This old agricultural village lies 2 km (1.2 mi) west of Moutier, in the chain of the Jura Mountains, on the left bank of the Chalière brook, which merges into the Birse river in Moutier. It is the western part of the Grand Val (valley of Moutier). In the southern area Combe Fabet, a kind of small throat has formed a secondary valley, from where the Chalière flows down. The Moron mountain marks the southern border of the community, rising to 1,140 meters (3,740 ft) of altitude. To the North, the communal territory extends to the chain from Mountain of Moutier, which constitutes the highest point of Perrefitte with its height of 1,158 m (3,799 ft).

The bordering communities are Moutier, Champoz and Souboz in canton of Bern, and Soulce in canton of Jura

Perrefitte has an area of 8.57 km^{2} (3.31 sq mi). As of 2012, a total of 2.61 km^{2} (1.01 mi^{2}) or 30.5% is used for agricultural purposes, while 5.64 km^{2} (2.18 mi^{2}) or 65.8% is forested. Of the rest of the land, 0.34 km^{2} (0.13 mi^{2}) or 4.0% is settled (buildings or roads), 0.01 km^{2} (2.5 acres) or 0.1% is either rivers or lakes and 0.01 km^{2} (2.5 acres) or 0.1% is unproductive land.

During the same year, housing and buildings made up 2.0% and transportation infrastructure made up 1.3%. Out of the forested land, 62.1% of the total land area is heavily forested and 3.7% is covered with orchards or small clusters of trees. Of the agricultural land, 2.8% is used for growing crops and 15.9% is pastures and 11.4% is used for alpine pastures. All the water in the municipality is flowing water.

On 31 December 2009 District de Moutier, the municipality's former district, was dissolved. On the following day, 1 January 2010, it joined the newly created Arrondissement administratif Jura bernois.

== Coat of arms ==
The blazon of the municipal coat of arms is Per pale Argent and Gules two Keys counterchanged adorsed.

== Demographics ==
Perrefitte has a population (as of December 2020) of 481. As of 2010, 11.7% of the population are resident foreign nationals. Over the last 10 years (2001-2011) the population has changed at a rate of -3.3%. Migration accounted for -2.9%, while births and deaths accounted for -0.6%.

Most of the population (as of 2000) speaks French (401 or 84.2%) as their first language, German is the second most common (44 or 9.2%) and Italian is the third (14 or 2.9%).

As of 2008, the population was 48.3% male and 51.7% female. The population was made up of 201 Swiss men (41.9% of the population) and 31 (6.5%) non-Swiss men. There were 223 Swiss women (46.5%) and 25 (5.2%) non-Swiss women. Of the population in the municipality, 131 or about 27.5% were born in Perrefitte and lived there in 2000. There were 161 or 33.8% who were born in the same canton, while 110 or 23.1% were born somewhere else in Switzerland, and 56 or 11.8% were born outside of Switzerland.

As of 2011, children and teenagers (0–19 years old) make up 18.5% of the population, while adults (20–64 years old) make up 59.9% and seniors (over 64 years old) make up 21.6%.

As of 2000, there were 180 people who were single and never married in the municipality. There were 259 married individuals, 28 widows or widowers and 9 individuals who are divorced.

As of 2010, there were 54 households that consist of only one person and 13 households with five or more people. In 2000, a total of 197 apartments (82.8% of the total) were permanently occupied, while 33 apartments (13.9%) were seasonally occupied and 8 apartments (3.4%) were empty. As of 2010, the construction rate of new housing units was 2.1 new units per 1000 residents. The vacancy rate for the municipality, in 2012, was 8.66%. In 2011, single family homes made up 66.5% of the total housing in the municipality.

The historical population is given in the following chart:

== Politics ==
In the 2011 federal election the most popular party was the Swiss People's Party (SVP) which received 42.6% of the vote. The next three most popular parties were the Social Democratic Party (SP) (14.4%), the Christian Democratic People's Party (CVP) (11%) and the Conservative Democratic Party (BDP) (8%). In the federal election, a total of 169 votes were cast, and the voter turnout was 50.3%.

== Economy ==
Perrefitte was characterized for a long time by agriculture. Then, following the industrialization of Moutier, some small companies were established along the Chalière, at the border of Moutier. Within the last decades the village was transformed into a quiet residential area. Now, many of its inhabitants work in nearby Moutier or commute even much further.

As of 2011, Perrefitte had an unemployment rate of 1.07%. As of 2008, there were a total of 78 people employed in the municipality. Of these, there were 26 people employed in the primary economic sector and about 8 businesses involved in this sector. 15 people were employed in the secondary sector and there were 9 businesses in this sector. 37 people were employed in the tertiary sector, with 14 businesses in this sector. There were 233 residents of the municipality who were employed in some capacity, of which females made up 35.6% of the workforce.

In 2008 there were a total of 52 full-time equivalent jobs. The number of jobs in the primary sector was 16, all of which were in agriculture. The number of jobs in the secondary sector was 11 of which 7 or (63.6%) were in manufacturing and 3 (27.3%) were in construction. The number of jobs in the tertiary sector was 25. In the tertiary sector; 4 or 16.0% were in wholesale or retail sales or the repair of motor vehicles, 4 or 16.0% were in the movement and storage of goods, 9 or 36.0% were in a hotel or restaurant, 2 or 8.0% were technical professionals or scientists, 3 or 12.0% were in education.

In 2000, there were 26 workers who commuted into the municipality and 173 workers who commuted away. The municipality is a net exporter of workers, with about 6.7 workers leaving the municipality for every one entering. A total of 60 workers (69.8% of the 86 total workers in the municipality) both lived and worked in Perrefitte.

Of the working population, 5.6% used public transportation to get to work, and 69.1% used a private car.

In 2011 the average local and cantonal tax rate on a married resident, with two children, of Perrefitte making 150,000 CHF was 13.1%, while an unmarried resident's rate was 19.3%. For comparison, the rate for the entire canton in the same year, was 14.2% and 22.0%, while the nationwide rate was 12.3% and 21.1% respectively. In 2009 there were a total of 201 tax payers in the municipality. Of that total, 57 made over 75,000 CHF per year. There were 3 people who made between 15,000 and 20,000 per year. The average income of the over 75,000 CHF group in Perrefitte was 104,372 CHF, while the average across all of Switzerland was 130,478 CHF. In 2011 a total of 2.3% of the population received direct financial assistance from the government.

== Religion ==
From the 2000 census, 186 or 39.1% belonged to the Swiss Reformed Church, while 143 or 30.0% were Roman Catholic. Of the rest of the population, there were 53 individuals (or about 11.13% of the population) who belonged to another Christian church. There were 17 (or about 3.57% of the population) who were Islamic. There were 3 individuals who belonged to another church. 60 (or about 12.61% of the population) belonged to no church, are agnostic or atheist, and 14 individuals (or about 2.94% of the population) did not answer the question.

== Education ==
In Perrefitte about 57% of the population have completed non-mandatory upper secondary education, and 12.5% have completed additional higher education (either university or a Fachhochschule). Of the 37 who had completed some form of tertiary schooling listed in the census, 59.5% were Swiss men, 18.9% were Swiss women, 16.2% were non-Swiss men.

The Canton of Bern school system provides one year of non-obligatory Kindergarten, followed by six years of Primary school. This is followed by three years of obligatory lower Secondary school where the students are separated according to ability and aptitude. Following the lower Secondary students may attend additional schooling or they may enter an apprenticeship.

During the 2011-12 school year, there were a total of 29 students attending classes in Perrefitte. There was one kindergarten class with a total of 8 students in the municipality. Of the kindergarten students, 25.0% were permanent or temporary residents of Switzerland (not citizens) and 12.5% have a different mother language than the classroom language. The municipality had one primary class and 21 students. Of the primary students, 14.3% were permanent or temporary residents of Switzerland (not citizens) and 9.5% have a different mother language than the classroom language.

As of 2000, there were a total of 37 students attending any school in the municipality. Of those, 36 both lived and attended school in the municipality, while one student came from another municipality. During the same year, 34 residents attended schools outside the municipality.

== Transportation ==
The community lies along the cantonal road which connects Moutier with Bellelay via Souboz. Soon, with the finalization of the "transjura" motorway A16, which shall connect the Swiss motorway network with that of France, Perrefitte shall obtain a fast access to the other areas.

== Sport ==
Over the past years, Perrefitte has become, during one weekend, the Swiss capital of the VTT, when the races of SwissPowerCup and Bike Cup Watch Valley proceed through the splendid landscapes of the mountains of the Jura.

== Gastronomy ==
The gastronomic guide Gault-Millau mentions a restaurant in Perrefitte: the Restaurant de l’Etoile (13 points out of 20 in the guide 2005)
