= Glovelier =

- Former municipality
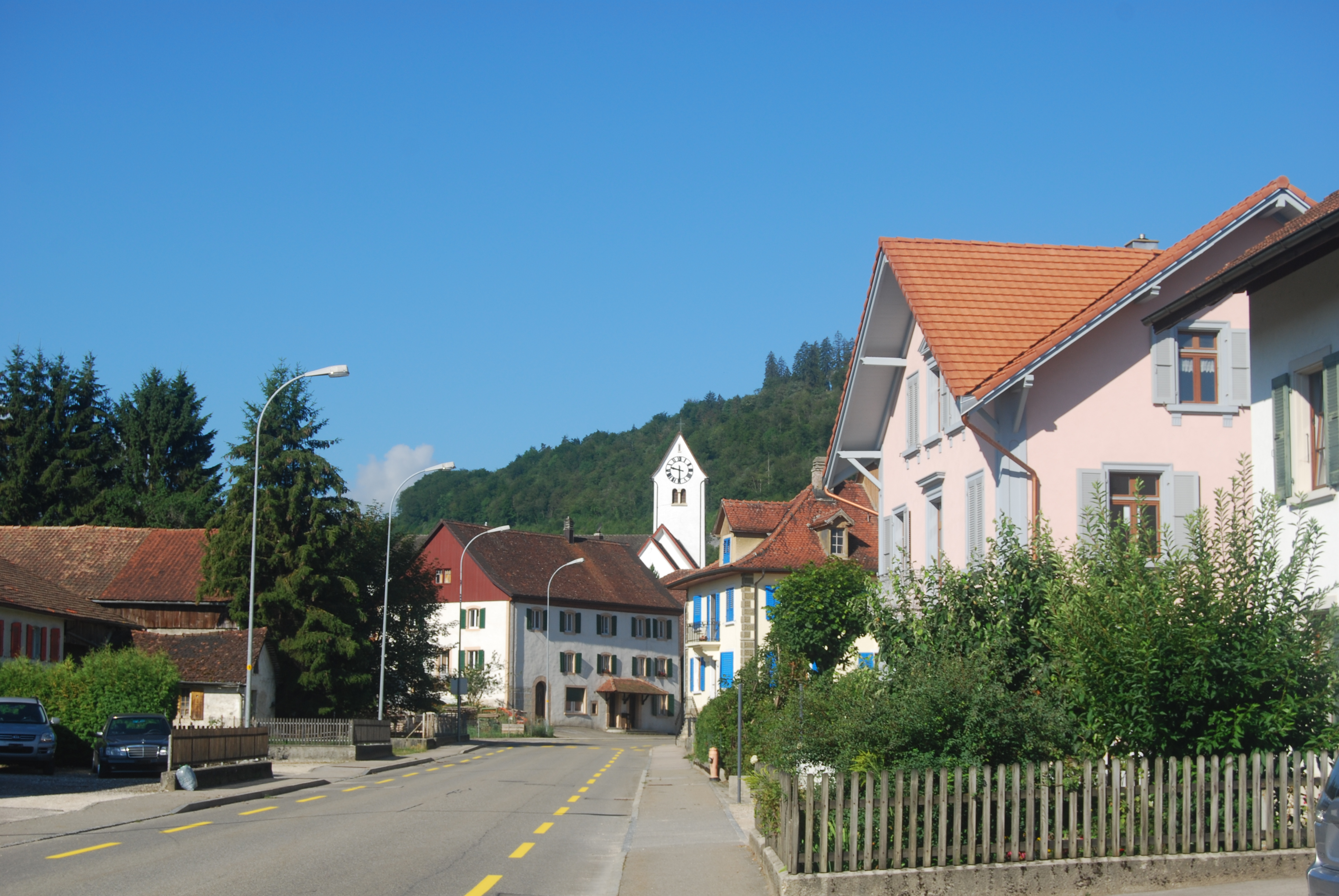
- Glovelier village

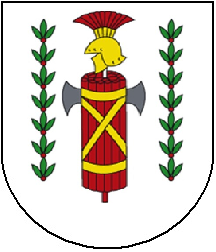
- Coat of arms
- Location of Glovelier
- Location within Switzerland Location within Canton of Jura
- Coordinates: 47°20′N 07°12′E
- Country: Switzerland
- Canton: Jura
- District: Delémont

Area
  - Total: 14.34 km^{2} (5.54 sq mi)
- Elevation: 515 m (1,690 ft)

Population (2011)
  - Total: 1,200
  - Density: 84/km^{2} (220/sq mi)
- Time zone: UTC+01:00 (CET)
  - Summer (DST): UTC+02:00 (CEST)
- Postal code: 2855
- SFOS number: 470
- ISO 3166 code: CH-JU
- Surrounded by: Boécourt, Bassecourt, Undervelier, Saulcy, Saint-Brais, Clos du Doubs
- Website: www.glovelier.ch

Glovelier (French pronunciation: [ɡlɔvəlje]) is a former municipality in the district of Delémont in the canton of Jura in Switzerland. On 1 January 2013 the former municipalities of Bassecourt, Courfaivre, Glovelier, Soulce and Undervelier merged to form the new municipality of Haute-Sorne.

== History ==
Glovelier is first mentioned in 1139 as Lolenviler.

== Geography ==
Aerial view (1955)

Glovelier had an area of 14.34 km^{2} (5.54 sq mi). Of this area, 5.99 km^{2} (2.31 mi^{2}) or 41.8% is used for agricultural purposes, while 6.71 km^{2} (2.59 mi^{2}) or 46.8% is forested. Of the rest of the land, 1.57 km^{2} (0.61 mi^{2}) or 10.9% is settled (buildings or roads), 0.03 km^{2} (7.4 acres) or 0.2% is either rivers or lakes and 0.03 km^{2} (7.4 acres) or 0.2% is unproductive land.

Of the built up area, industrial buildings made up 1.3% of the total area while housing and buildings made up 3.1% and transportation infrastructure made up 5.4%. Out of the forested land, 43.2% of the total land area is heavily forested and 3.6% is covered with orchards or small clusters of trees. Of the agricultural land, 11.4% is used for growing crops and 18.3% is pastures and 11.5% is used for alpine pastures. All the water in the municipality is flowing water.

The former municipality is located in the Delemont district, on the western end of the Delemont valley. The village lies at the intersection of the old road from Porrentruy to Biel and from Delemont to La Chaux-de-Fonds. It consists of the village of Glovelier and the hamlet of Sceut.

== Coat of arms ==
The blazon of the municipal coat of arms is Argent, between two Laurel Branches Proper in pale Fasces Gules, ribboned Or and double bladed Proper topped with a Roman Helmet Or crested Gules.

== Demographics ==
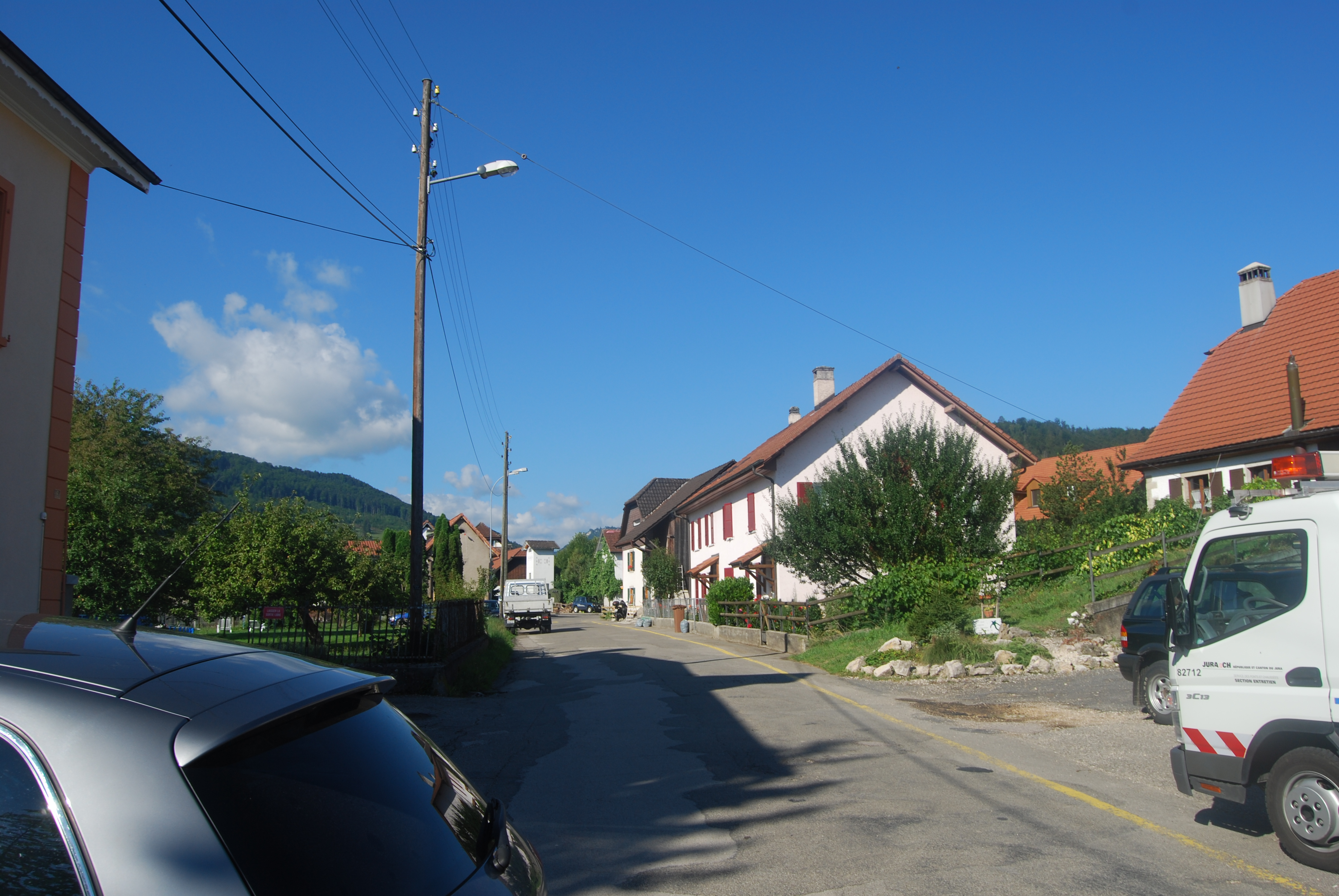
Glovelier village

Glovelier had a population (as of 2011) of 1,200. As of 2008, 7.8% of the population are resident foreign nationals. Over the last 10 years (2000–2010) the population has changed at a rate of 7.9%. Migration accounted for 4.7%, while births and deaths accounted for 4.5%.

Most of the population (as of 2000) speaks French (1,033 or 92.1%) as their first language, German is the second most common (25 or 2.2%) and Italian is the third (20 or 1.8%).

As of 2008, the population was 50.0% male and 50.0% female. The population was made up of 543 Swiss men (45.7% of the population) and 52 (4.4%) non-Swiss men. There were 557 Swiss women (46.8%) and 37 (3.1%) non-Swiss women. Of the population in the municipality, 465 or about 41.4% were born in Glovelier and lived there in 2000. There were 347 or 30.9% who were born in the same canton, while 122 or 10.9% were born somewhere else in Switzerland, and 153 or 13.6% were born outside of Switzerland.

As of 2000, children and teenagers (0–19 years old) make up 25.7% of the population, while adults (20–64 years old) make up 58.6% and seniors (over 64 years old) make up 15.7%.

As of 2000, there were 449 people who were single and never married in the municipality. There were 560 married individuals, 77 widows or widowers and 36 individuals who are divorced.

As of 2000, there were 436 private households in the municipality, and an average of 2.5 persons per household. There were 112 households that consist of only one person and 37 households with five or more people. In 2000, a total of 426 apartments (84.0% of the total) were permanently occupied, while 59 apartments (11.6%) were seasonally occupied and 22 apartments (4.3%) were empty. As of 2009, the construction rate of new housing units was 7.6 new units per 1000 residents. The vacancy rate for the municipality, in 2010, was 0.72%.

The historical population is given in the following chart:

== Heritage sites of national significance ==
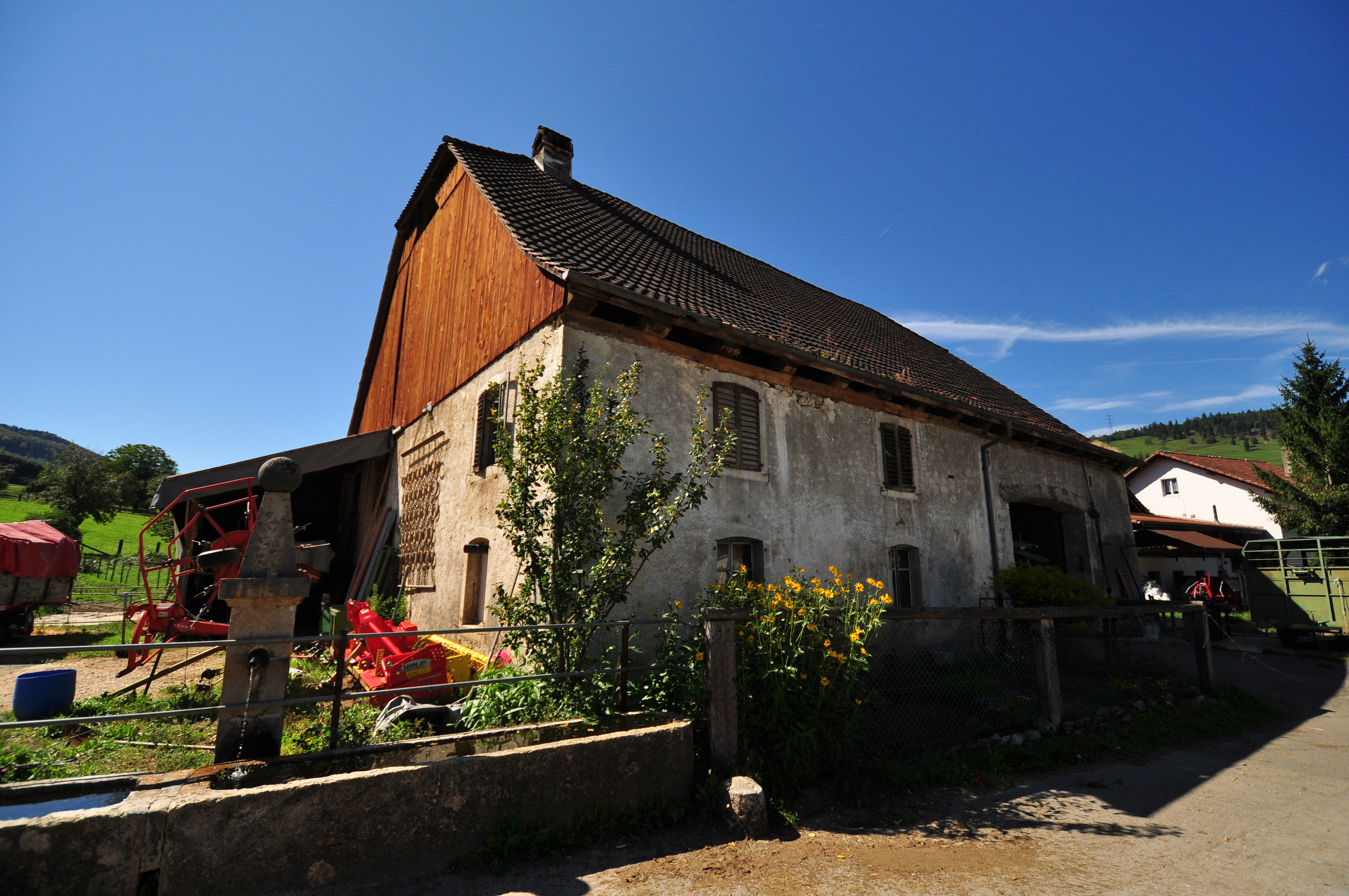
Glovelier farm house

The Farm House at Au Village 17 and the prehistoric shelter at Le Mont, which is shared with Saint-Brais, are listed as Swiss heritage site of national significance.

== Politics ==
In the 2007 federal election the most popular party was the SPS which received 28.55% of the vote. The next three most popular parties were the CSP (26.38%), the CVP (25.35%) and the FDP (11.27%). In the federal election, a total of 405 votes were cast, and the voter turnout was 49.3%.

== Economy ==
Glovelier train station

As of 2010, Glovelier had an unemployment rate of 5.1%. As of 2008, there were 65 people employed in the primary economic sector and about 21 businesses involved in this sector. 694 people were employed in the secondary sector and there were 23 businesses in this sector. 146 people were employed in the tertiary sector, with 41 businesses in this sector. There were 558 residents of the municipality who were employed in some capacity, of which females made up 44.4% of the workforce.

In 2008 the total number of full-time equivalent jobs was 823. The number of jobs in the primary sector was 46, of which 35 were in agriculture and 12 were in forestry or lumber production. The number of jobs in the secondary sector was 668 of which 633 or (94.8%) were in manufacturing and 35 (5.2%) were in construction. The number of jobs in the tertiary sector was 109. In the tertiary sector; 28 or 25.7% were in wholesale or retail sales or the repair of motor vehicles, 27 or 24.8% were in the movement and storage of goods, 20 or 18.3% were in a hotel or restaurant, 1 was in the information industry, 14 or 12.8% were technical professionals or scientists, 9 or 8.3% were in education and 3 or 2.8% were in health care.

In 2000, there were 780 workers who commuted into the municipality and 340 workers who commuted away. The municipality is a net importer of workers, with about 2.3 workers entering the municipality for every one leaving. About 24.1% of the workforce coming into Glovelier are coming from outside Switzerland. Of the working population, 11.1% used public transportation to get to work, and 58.1% used a private car.

== Religion ==
From the 2000 census, 919 or 81.9% were Roman Catholic, while 83 or 7.4% belonged to the Swiss Reformed Church. Of the rest of the population, there were 23 members of an Orthodox church (or about 2.05% of the population), there was 1 individual who belongs to the Christian Catholic Church, and there were 8 individuals (or about 0.71% of the population) who belonged to another Christian church. There were 15 (or about 1.34% of the population) who were Islamic. There were 4 individuals who were Buddhist. 28 (or about 2.50% of the population) belonged to no church, are agnostic or atheist, and 45 individuals (or about 4.01% of the population) did not answer the question.

== Transport ==
Glovelier sits on the Delémont–Delle and Saignelégier–Glovelier lines and is served by trains at Glovelier railway station.

== Education ==
In Glovelier about 371 or (33.1%) of the population have completed non-mandatory upper secondary education, and 87 or (7.8%) have completed additional higher education (either university or a Fachhochschule). Of the 87 who completed tertiary schooling, 69.0% were Swiss men, 24.1% were Swiss women, 6.9% were non-Swiss men.

The Canton of Jura school system provides two year of non-obligatory Kindergarten, followed by six years of Primary school. This is followed by three years of obligatory lower Secondary school where the students are separated according to ability and aptitude. Following the lower Secondary students may attend a three or four year optional upper Secondary school followed by some form of Tertiary school or they may enter an apprenticeship.

During the 2009-10 school year, there were a total of 144 students attending 8 classes in Glovelier. There were 1.5 kindergarten classes with a total of 26 students in the municipality. The municipality had 6 primary classes and 118 students. There are only nine Secondary schools in the canton, so all the students from Glovelier attend their secondary school in another municipality.

As of 2000, there were 3 students in Glovelier who came from another municipality, while 73 residents attended schools outside the municipality.
