= Bassecourt =

- Former municipality
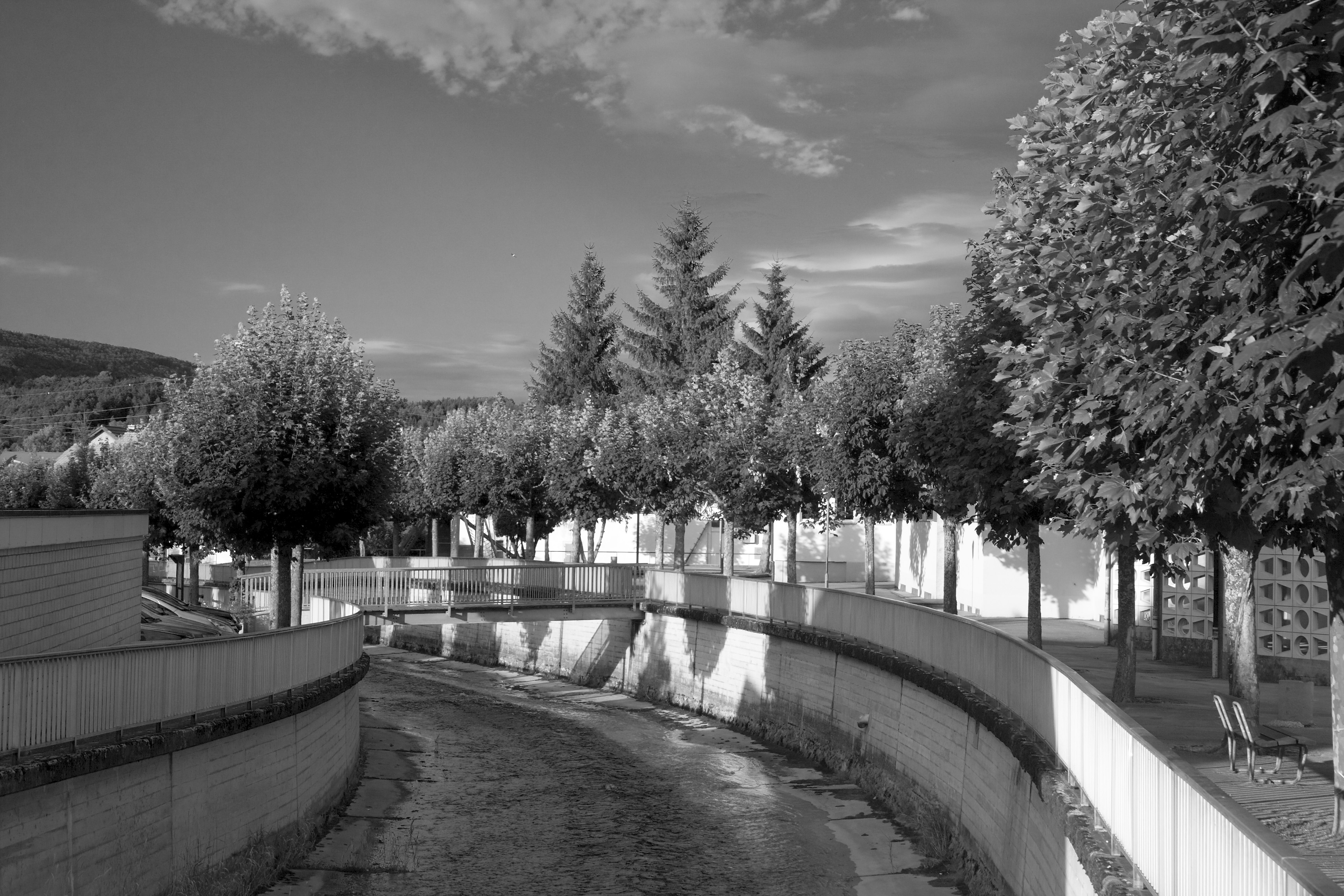
- Sorne river at Bassecourt

- Coat of arms
- Location of Bassecourt
- Location within Switzerland Location within Canton of Jura
- Coordinates: 47°21′N 07°14′E
- Country: Switzerland
- Canton: Jura
- District: Delémont

Government
  - Mayor: Françoise Cattin

Area
  - Total: 15.57 km^{2} (6.01 sq mi)
- Elevation: 477 m (1,565 ft)

Population (2011)
  - Total: 3,439
  - Density: 220.9/km^{2} (572.1/sq mi)
- Demonym: Les Patas
- Time zone: UTC+01:00 (CET)
  - Summer (DST): UTC+02:00 (CEST)
- Postal code: 2854
- SFOS number: 461
- ISO 3166 code: CH-JU
- Localities: Berlincourt
- Surrounded by: Glovelier, Boécourt, Develier, Courfaivre, Undervelier.
- Website: www.bassecourt.ch

Bassecourt (French pronunciation: [baskuʁ]; Frainc-Comtou: Baîchecouét) is a former municipality in the district of Delémont in the canton of Jura in Switzerland. On 1 January 2013 the former municipalities of Bassecourt, Courfaivre, Glovelier, Soulce and Undervelier merged to form the new municipality of Haute-Sorne.

== History ==
Bassecourt is first mentioned in 1160 as Baressicort. In 1184 it was first mentioned by its German name, Altdorf. The hamlet of Berlincourt was first mentioned in 1303 as Burlincort.

== Geography ==
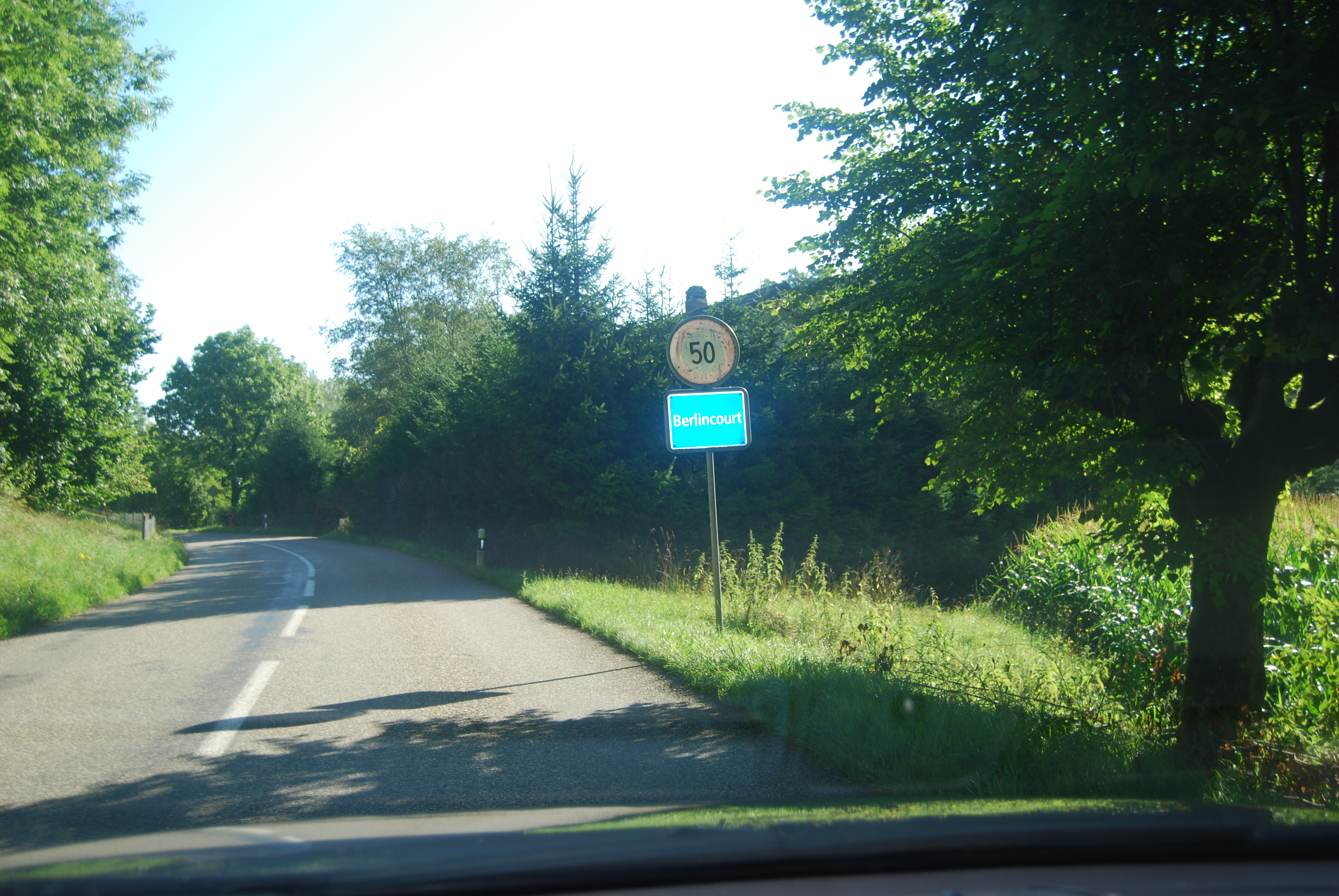
Berlincourt village entrance

Aerial view (1955)

Bassecourt had an area of 15.57 km^{2} (6.01 sq mi). Of this area, 5.84 km^{2} (2.25 mi^{2}) or 37.5% is used for agricultural purposes, while 7.77 km^{2} (3.00 mi^{2}) or 49.9% is forested. Of the rest of the land, 1.9 km^{2} (0.73 mi^{2}) or 12.2% is settled (buildings or roads), 0.06 km^{2} (15 acres) or 0.4% is either rivers or lakes and 0.01 km^{2} (2.5 acres) or 0.1% is unproductive land.

Of the built up area, housing and buildings made up 7.1% and transportation infrastructure made up 3.3%. Out of the forested land, 47.8% of the total land area is heavily forested and 2.1% is covered with orchards or small clusters of trees. Of the agricultural land, 18.6% is used for growing crops and 11.5% is pastures and 6.9% is used for alpine pastures. All the water in the municipality is flowing water.

The former municipality is located in the Delemont district, along the Sorne river in the Delemont valley. It lies at the intersection of the Delémont-La Chaux-de-Fonds and the Porrentruy-Biel/Bienne roads. It consists of the village of Bassecourt and the hamlet of Berlincourt.

== Coat of arms ==
The blazon of the municipal coat of arms is Or three Piles in fess shortened Sable.

== Demographics ==
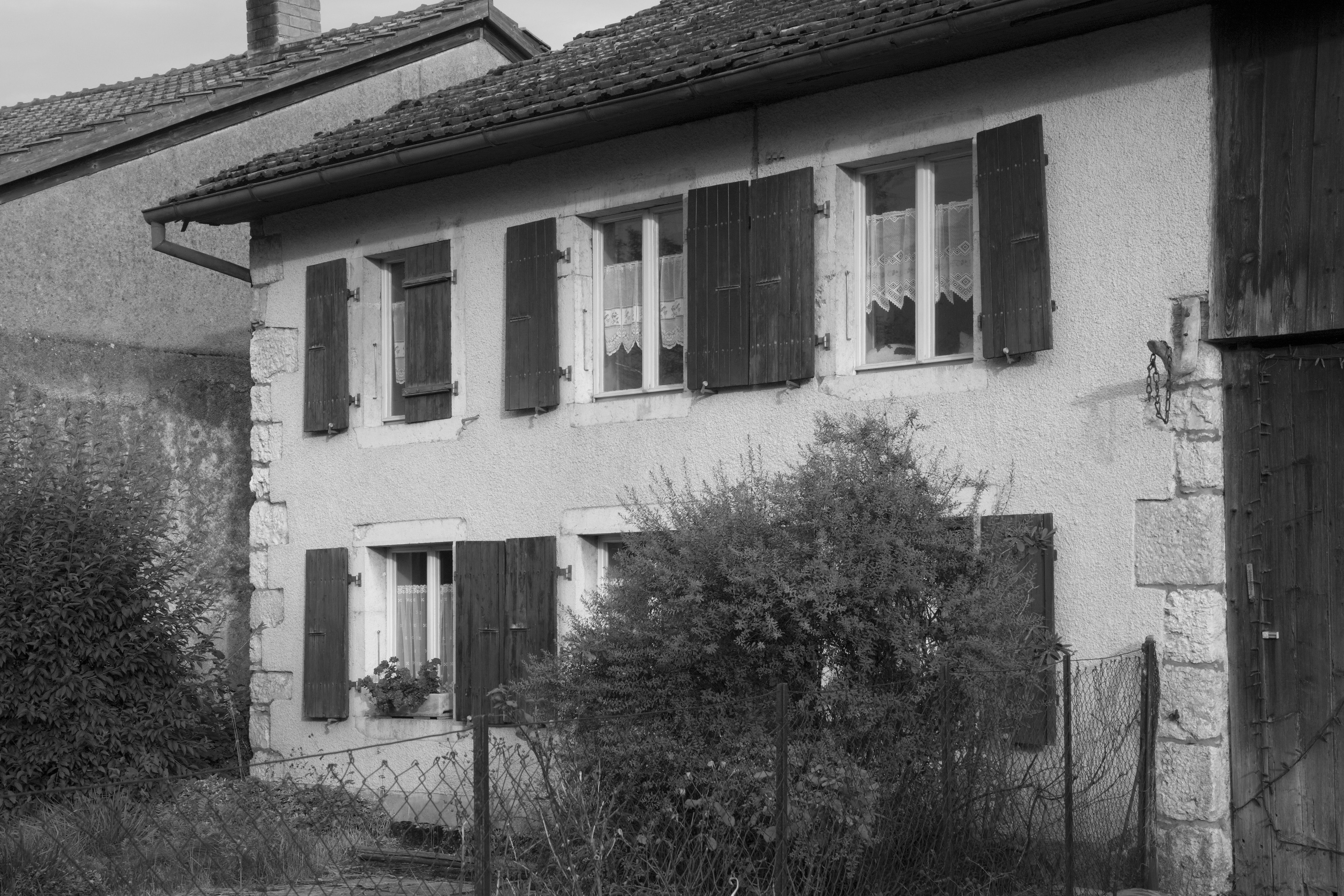
House in Bassecourt

Bassecourt had a population (as of 2011) of 3,439. As of 2008, 17.7% of the population are resident foreign nationals. Over the last 10 years (2000–2010) the population has changed at a rate of -1.2%. Migration accounted for -0.6%, while births and deaths accounted for 0.8%.

Most of the population (as of 2000) speaks French (2,904 or 88.5%) as their first language, Italian is the second most common (104 or 3.2%) and German is the third (95 or 2.9%). There is 1 person who speaks Romansh.

As of 2008, the population was 48.8% male and 51.2% female. The population was made up of 1,339 Swiss men (39.3% of the population) and 321 (9.4%) non-Swiss men. There were 1,456 Swiss women (42.8%) and 287 (8.4%) non-Swiss women. Of the population in the municipality, 1,148 or about 35.0% were born in Bassecourt and lived there in 2000. There were 1,117 or 34.0% who were born in the same canton, while 422 or 12.9% were born somewhere else in Switzerland, and 588 or 17.9% were born outside of Switzerland.

As of 2000, children and teenagers (0–19 years old) make up 25.7% of the population, while adults (20–64 years old) make up 58% and seniors (over 64 years old) make up 16.2%.

As of 2000, there were 1,230 people who were single and never married in the municipality. There were 1,700 married individuals, 222 widows or widowers and 131 individuals who are divorced.

As of 2000, there were 1,325 private households in the municipality, and an average of 2.5 persons per household. There were 346 households that consist of only one person and 93 households with five or more people. In 2000, a total of 1,293 apartments (91.6% of the total) were permanently occupied, while 50 apartments (3.5%) were seasonally occupied and 69 apartments (4.9%) were empty. As of 2009, the construction rate of new housing units was 1.5 new units per 1000 residents. The vacancy rate for the municipality, in 2010, was 0.94%.

The historical population is given in the following chart:

== Politics ==
In the 2007 federal election the most popular party was the SPS which received 30.11% of the vote. The next three most popular parties were the CVP (25.86%), the CSP (19.24%) and the SVP (14.76%). In the federal election, a total of 874 votes were cast, and the voter turnout was 39.4%.

== Economy ==
As of 2010, Bassecourt had an unemployment rate of 5.8%. As of 2008, there were 38 people employed in the primary economic sector and about 14 businesses involved in this sector. 823 people were employed in the secondary sector and there were 55 businesses in this sector. 742 people were employed in the tertiary sector, with 105 businesses in this sector. There were 1,578 residents of the municipality who were employed in some capacity, of which females made up 41.6% of the workforce.

In 2008 the total number of full-time equivalent jobs was 1,402. The number of jobs in the primary sector was 28, of which 22 were in agriculture and 6 were in forestry or lumber production. The number of jobs in the secondary sector was 787 of which 654 or (83.1%) were in manufacturing and 133 (16.9%) were in construction. The number of jobs in the tertiary sector was 587. In the tertiary sector; 290 or 49.4% were in wholesale or retail sales or the repair of motor vehicles, 23 or 3.9% were in the movement and storage of goods, 31 or 5.3% were in a hotel or restaurant, 8 or 1.4% were in the information industry, 11 or 1.9% were the insurance or financial industry, 27 or 4.6% were technical professionals or scientists, 58 or 9.9% were in education and 107 or 18.2% were in health care.

In 2000, there were 840 workers who commuted into the municipality and 910 workers who commuted away. The municipality is a net exporter of workers, with about 1.1 workers leaving the municipality for every one entering. About 12.1% of the workforce coming into Bassecourt are coming from outside Switzerland. Of the working population, 11.5% used public transportation to get to work, and 63.2% used a private car.

== Religion ==
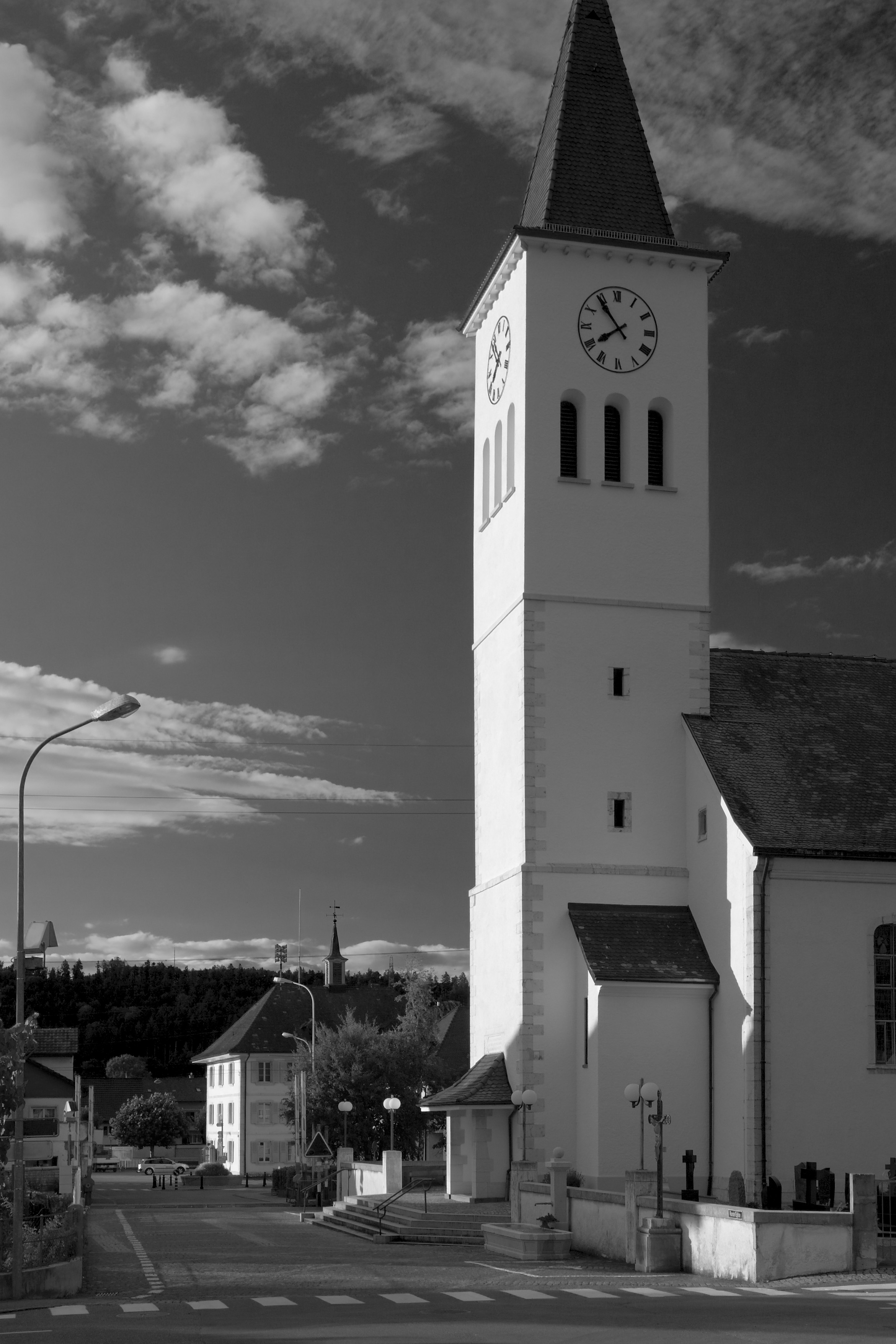
Church in Bassecourt

From the 2000 census, 2,619 or 79.8% were Roman Catholic, while 287 or 8.7% belonged to the Swiss Reformed Church. Of the rest of the population, there were 64 members of an Orthodox church (or about 1.95% of the population), there were 3 individuals (or about 0.09% of the population) who belonged to the Christian Catholic Church, and there were 134 individuals (or about 4.08% of the population) who belonged to another Christian church. There was 1 individual who was Jewish, and 88 (or about 2.68% of the population) who were Islamic. There was 1 person who was Buddhist, 1 person who was Hindu and 6 individuals who belonged to another church. 124 (or about 3.78% of the population) belonged to no church, are agnostic or atheist, and 22 individuals (or about 0.67% of the population) did not answer the question.

== Transport ==
Bassecourt sits on the Delémont–Delle line and is served by trains at Bassecourt railway station.

== Education ==
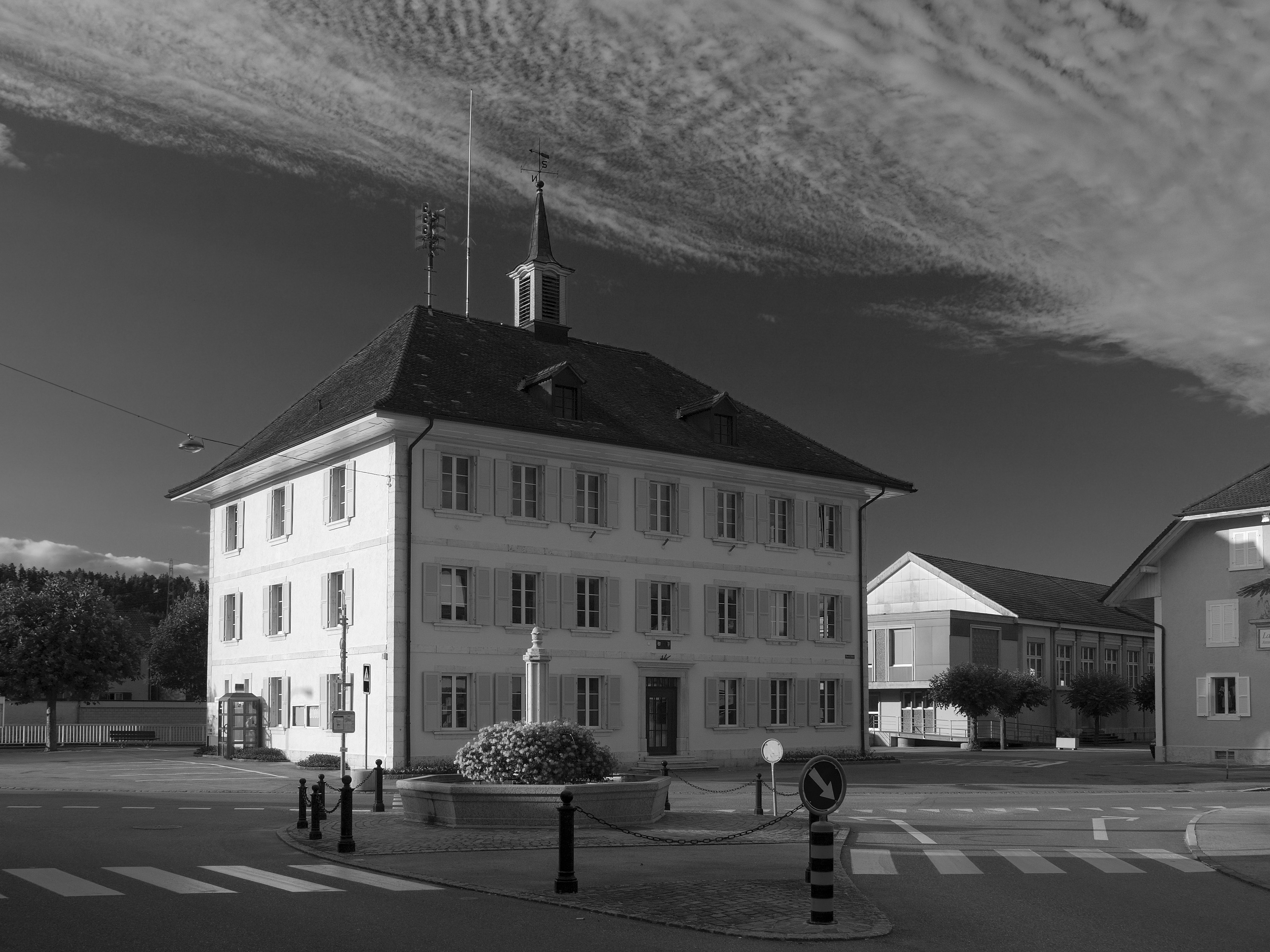
Bassecourt school house

In Bassecourt about 1,132 or (34.5%) of the population have completed non-mandatory upper secondary education, and 259 or (7.9%) have completed additional higher education (either university or a Fachhochschule). Of the 259 who completed tertiary schooling, 62.9% were Swiss men, 24.7% were Swiss women, 6.2% were non-Swiss men and 6.2% were non-Swiss women.

The Canton of Jura school system provides two year of non-obligatory Kindergarten, followed by six years of Primary school. This is followed by three years of obligatory lower Secondary school where the students are separated according to ability and aptitude. Following the lower Secondary students may attend a three or four year optional upper Secondary school followed by some form of Tertiary school or they may enter an apprenticeship.

During the 2009-10 school year, there were a total of 607 students attending 31 classes in Bassecourt. There were 4 kindergarten classes with a total of 66 students in the municipality. The municipality had 12 primary classes and 263 students. During the same year, there were 15 lower secondary classes with a total of 278 students.

As of 2000, there were 174 students in Bassecourt who came from another municipality, while 111 residents attended schools outside the municipality.

== Notable personalities ==
- Grégoire Saucy (born 1999), racing driver
