= Undervelier =

- Former municipality
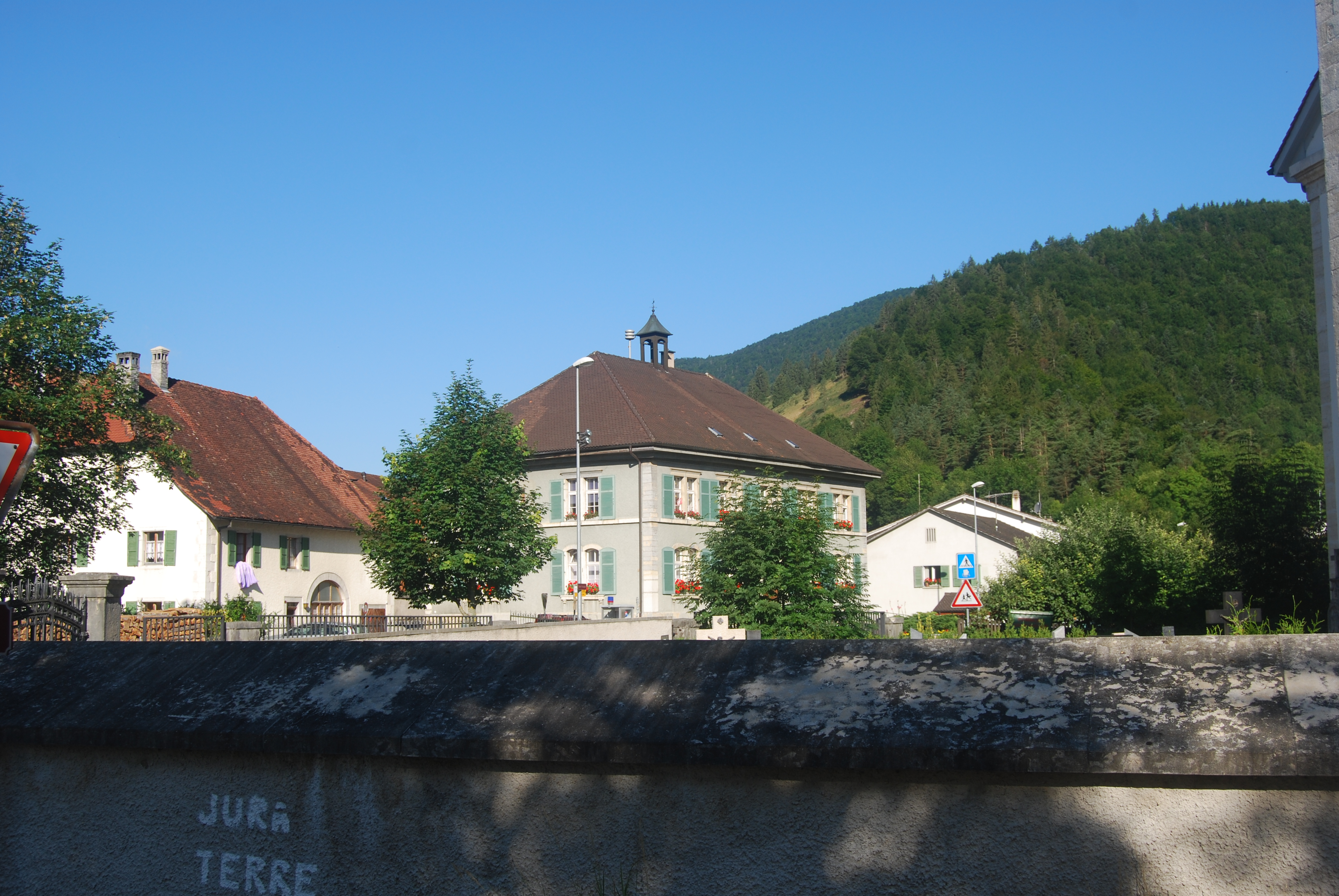
- Undervelier village

- Coat of arms
- Location of Undervelier
- Location within Switzerland Location within Canton of Jura
- Coordinates: 47°18′N 07°14′E
- Country: Switzerland
- Canton: Jura
- District: Delémont

Area
  - Total: 14 km^{2} (5.4 sq mi)
- Elevation: 536 m (1,759 ft)

Population (2011)
  - Total: 296
  - Density: 21/km^{2} (55/sq mi)
- Time zone: UTC+01:00 (CET)
  - Summer (DST): UTC+02:00 (CEST)
- Postal code: 2863
- SFOS number: 6725
- ISO 3166 code: CH-JU
- Surrounded by: Saulcy, Glovelier, Bassecourt, Courfaivre, Soulce, Souboz(BE), Sornetan(BE), Monible(BE), Rebévelier(BE)
- Website: www.haute-sorne.ch

Undervelier is a former municipality in the district of Delémont in the canton of Jura in Switzerland. On 1 January 2013 the former municipalities of Bassecourt, Courfaivre, Glovelier, Soulce and Undervelier merged to form the new municipality of Haute-Sorne.

== History ==
Undervelier is first mentioned in 1179 as Undreviller. The municipality was formerly known by its unknown name Underswiler, however, that name is no longer used.

== Geography ==
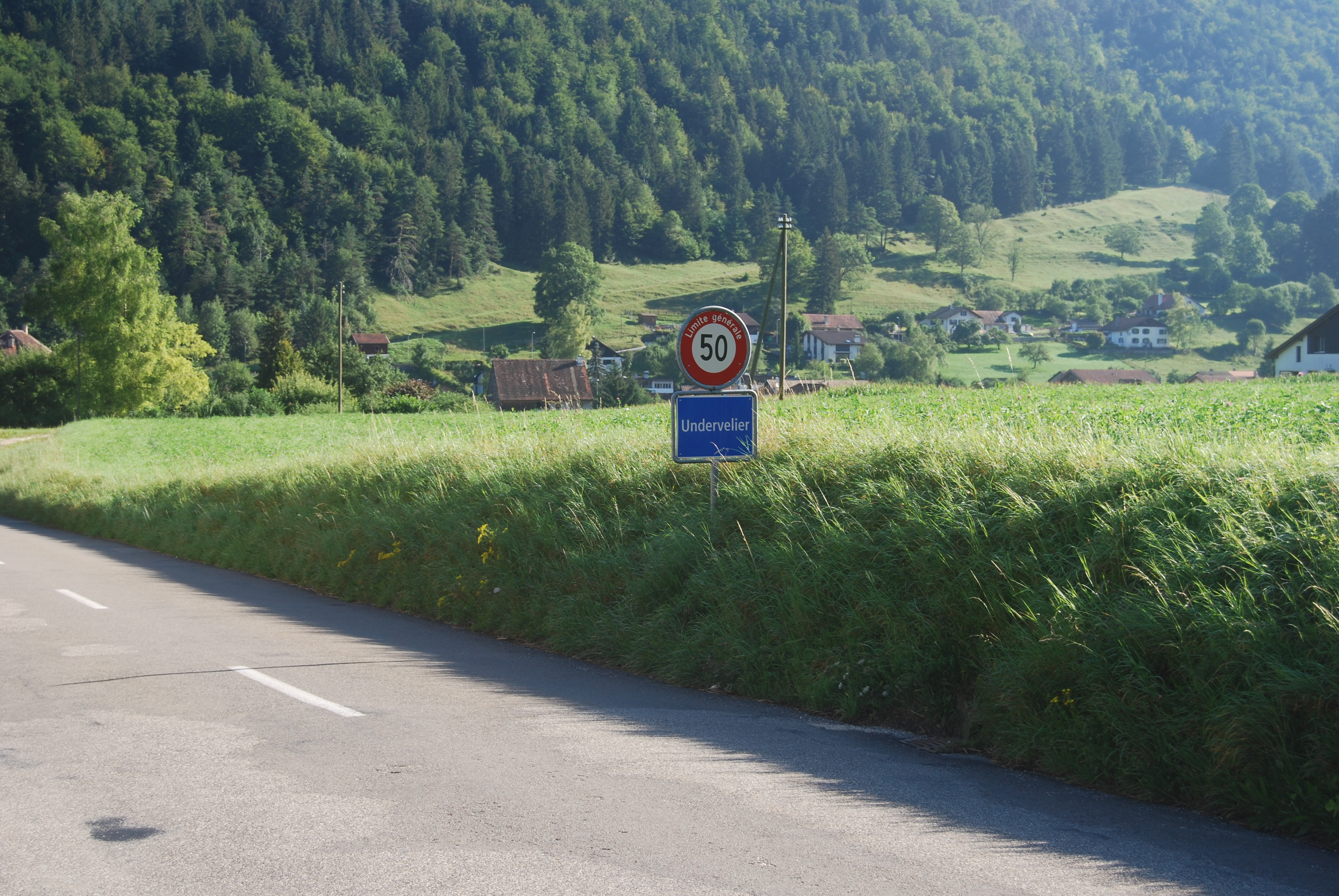
Undervelier village

Undervelier had an area of 13.98 km^{2} (5.40 sq mi). Of this area, 3.38 km^{2} (1.31 mi^{2}) or 24.2% is used for agricultural purposes, while 10.25 km^{2} (3.96 mi^{2}) or 73.3% is forested. Of the rest of the land, 0.3 km^{2} (0.12 mi^{2}) or 2.1% is settled (buildings or roads), 0.02 km^{2} (4.9 acres) or 0.1% is either rivers or lakes and 0.03 km^{2} (7.4 acres) or 0.2% is unproductive land.

Of the built up area, housing and buildings made up 1.1% and transportation infrastructure made up 0.9%. Out of the forested land, 70.7% of the total land area is heavily forested and 2.6% is covered with orchards or small clusters of trees. Of the agricultural land, 2.8% is used for growing crops and 13.5% is pastures and 7.7% is used for alpine pastures. All the water in the municipality is flowing water.

The former municipality is located in the Delemont district, between two of the Sorne river canyons and at the foot of Pichoux mountain.

== Coat of arms ==
The blazon of the municipal coat of arms is Or three Piles issuant from sinister shortened Sable.

== Demographics ==
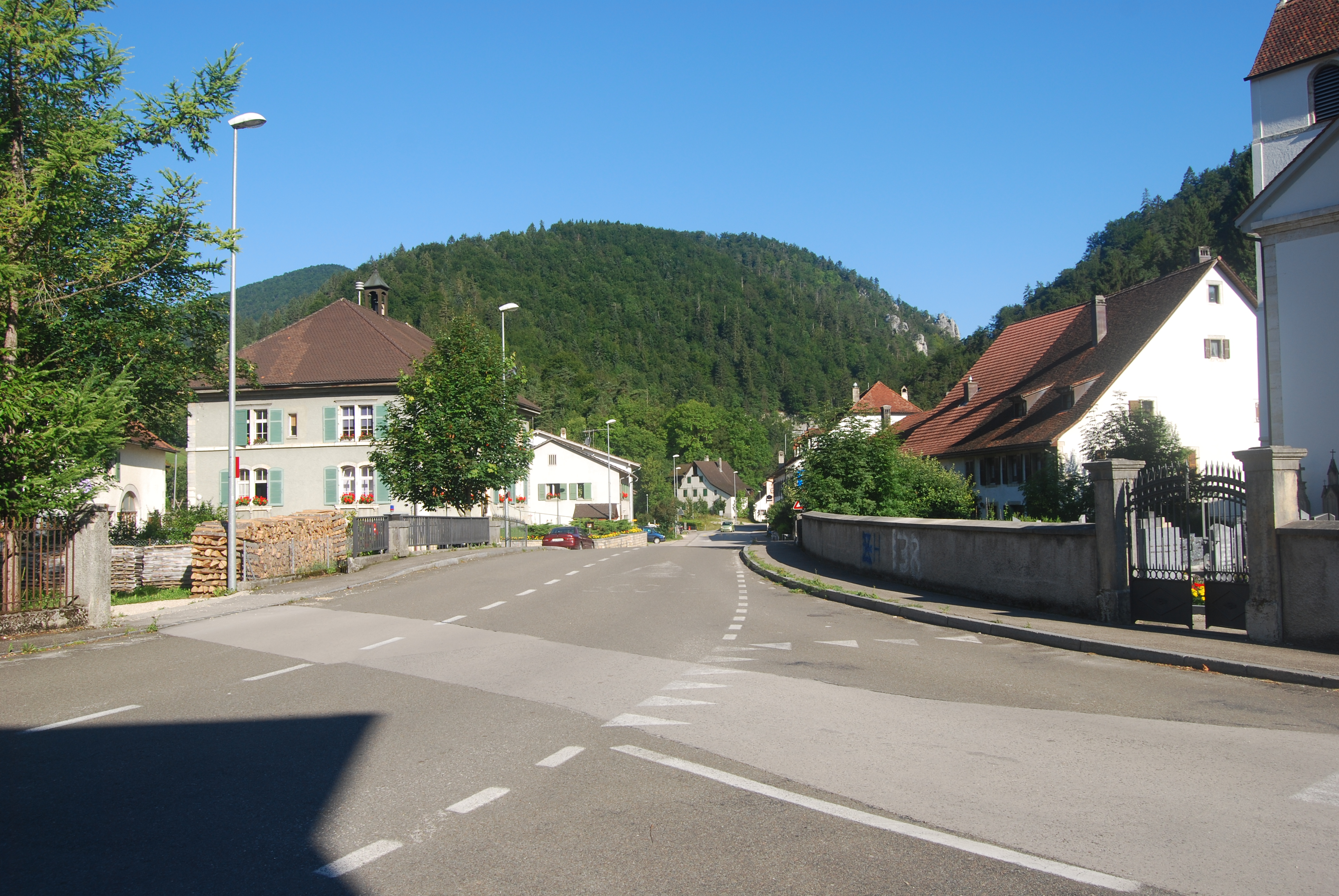
Undervelier

Undervelier had a population (as of 2011) of 296. As of 2008, 10.5% of the population are resident foreign nationals. Over the last 10 years (2000–2010) the population has changed at a rate of -4.6%. Migration accounted for 2.8%, while births and deaths accounted for -3.7%.

Most of the population (as of 2000) speaks French (258 or 80.4%) as their first language, German is the second most common (49 or 15.3%) and Italian is the third (7 or 2.2%).

As of 2008, the population was 50.0% male and 50.0% female. The population was made up of 136 Swiss men (44.2% of the population) and 18 (5.8%) non-Swiss men. There were 142 Swiss women (46.1%) and 12 (3.9%) non-Swiss women. Of the population in the municipality, 135 or about 42.1% were born in Undervelier and lived there in 2000. There were 68 or 21.2% who were born in the same canton, while 73 or 22.7% were born somewhere else in Switzerland, and 32 or 10.0% were born outside of Switzerland.

As of 2000, children and teenagers (0–19 years old) make up 28% of the population, while adults (20–64 years old) make up 51.7% and seniors (over 64 years old) make up 20.2%.

As of 2000, there were 136 people who were single and never married in the municipality. There were 142 married individuals, 26 widows or widowers and 17 individuals who are divorced.

As of 2000, there were 131 private households in the municipality, and an average of 2.3 persons per household. There were 49 households that consist of only one person and 15 households with five or more people. In 2000, a total of 128 apartments (72.3% of the total) were permanently occupied, while 40 apartments (22.6%) were seasonally occupied and 9 apartments (5.1%) were empty. The vacancy rate for the municipality, in 2010, was 1.11%.

The historical population is given in the following chart:

== Sights ==
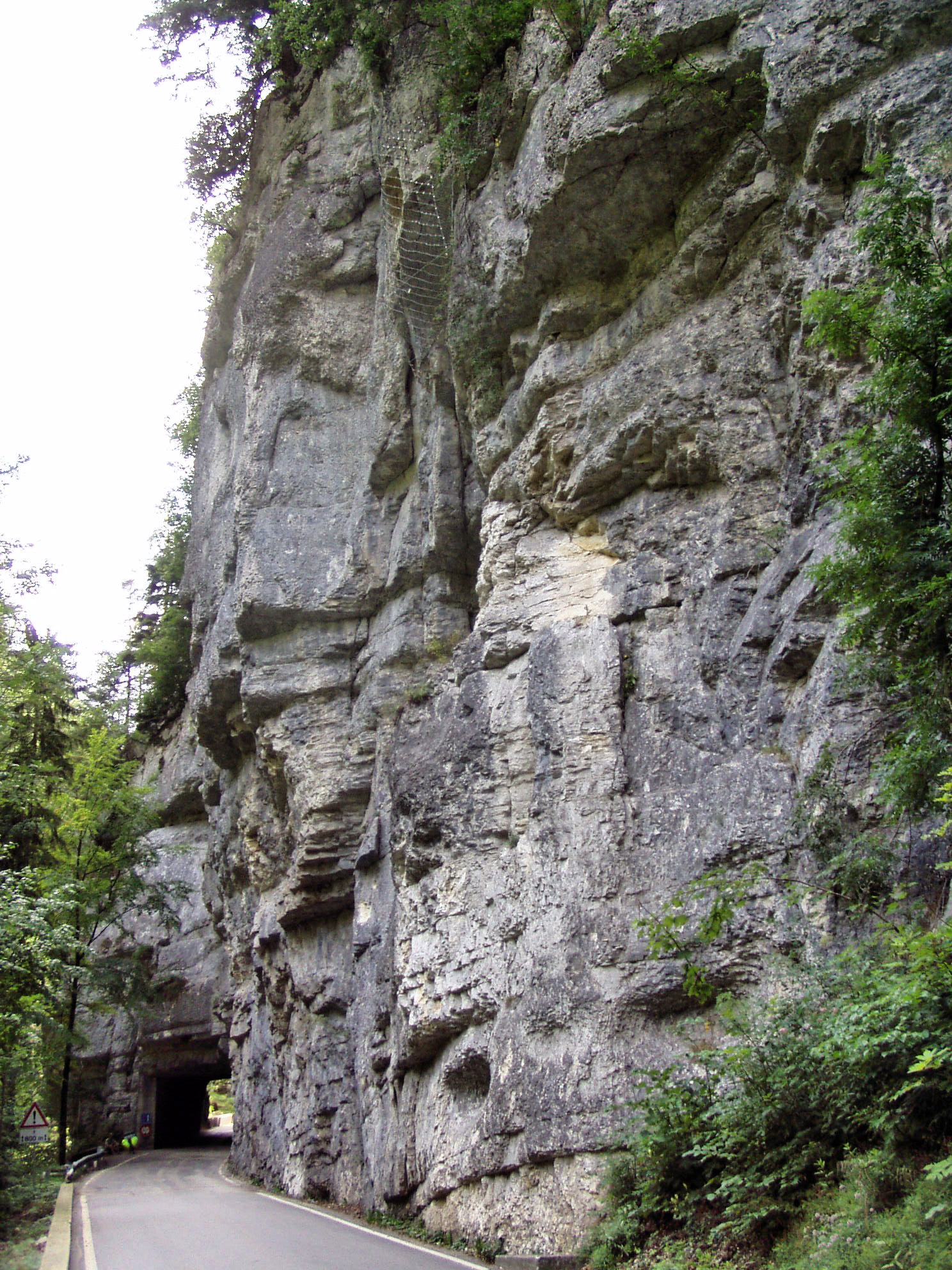
Road through one of the Gorges of Pichoux

The entire Les Forges area is designated as part of the Inventory of Swiss Heritage Sites.

Notable sights in the area include the cave of Sainte-Colombe and the Gorges of Pichoux. Other sights include the Vellerat Posé because of its greenery and the chapel Place Roland Béguelin built by Jeanne Bueche and André Bréchet's stained glass windows.

== Politics ==
In the 2007 federal election the most popular party was the SPS which received 50.63% of the vote. The next three most popular parties were the CVP (12.66%), the CVP (12.66%) and the CVP (12.66%). In the federal election, a total of 79 votes were cast, and the voter turnout was 36.7%.

== Economy ==
As of 2010, Undervelier had an unemployment rate of 7.4%. As of 2008, there were 38 people employed in the primary economic sector and about 14 businesses involved in this sector. 28 people were employed in the secondary sector and there were 6 businesses in this sector. 13 people were employed in the tertiary sector, with 7 businesses in this sector. There were 129 residents of the municipality who were employed in some capacity, of which females made up 38.0% of the workforce.

In 2008 the total number of full-time equivalent jobs was 63. The number of jobs in the primary sector was 29, of which 28 were in agriculture and 1 was in forestry or lumber production. The number of jobs in the secondary sector was 26 of which 23 or (88.5%) were in manufacturing and 3 (11.5%) were in construction. The number of jobs in the tertiary sector was 8. In the tertiary sector; 3 or 37.5% were in wholesale or retail sales or the repair of motor vehicles, 2 or 25.0% were in a hotel or restaurant, 1 was in the information industry, and 1 was a technical professional or scientist.

In 2000, there were 28 workers who commuted into the municipality and 77 workers who commuted away. The municipality is a net exporter of workers, with about 2.8 workers leaving the municipality for every one entering. Of the working population, 10.1% used public transportation to get to work, and 51.2% used a private car.

== Religion ==
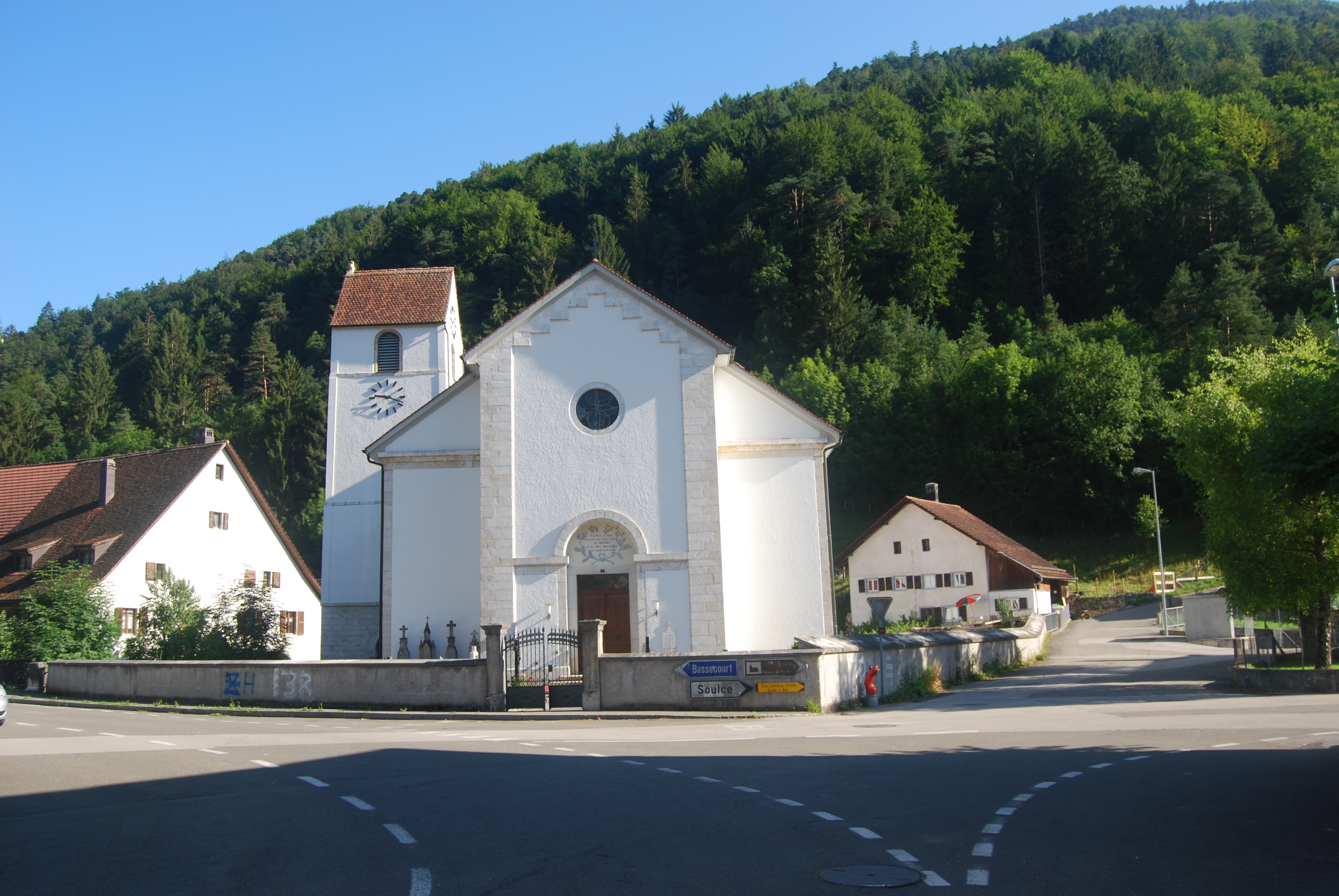
Undervelier village church

From the 2000 census, 186 or 57.9% were Roman Catholic, while 51 or 15.9% belonged to the Swiss Reformed Church. Of the rest of the population, there was 1 individual who belongs to the Christian Catholic Church, and there were 34 individuals (or about 10.59% of the population) who belonged to another Christian church. There were 7 (or about 2.18% of the population) who were Islamic. There was 1 person who was Buddhist. 47 (or about 14.64% of the population) belonged to no church, are agnostic or atheist, and 11 individuals (or about 3.43% of the population) did not answer the question.

== Education ==
In Undervelier about 102 or (31.8%) of the population have completed non-mandatory upper secondary education, and 16 or (5.0%) have completed additional higher education (either university or a Fachhochschule). Of the 16 who completed tertiary schooling, 62.5% were Swiss men, 18.8% were Swiss women.

The Canton of Jura school system provides two year of non-obligatory Kindergarten, followed by six years of Primary school. This is followed by three years of obligatory lower Secondary school where the students are separated according to ability and aptitude. Following the lower Secondary students may attend a three or four year optional upper Secondary school followed by some form of Tertiary school or they may enter an apprenticeship.

During the 2009-10 school year, there were no students attending school in Undervelier.

As of 2000, there were 16 students in Undervelier who came from another municipality, while 33 residents attended schools outside the municipality.
