= Soulce =

- Former municipality
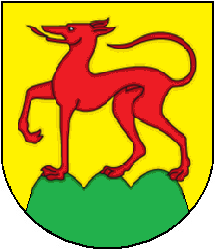
- Coat of arms
- Location of Soulce
- Location within Switzerland Location within Canton of Jura
- Coordinates: 47°18′N 07°16′E
- Country: Switzerland
- Canton: Jura
- District: Delémont

Area
  - Total: 14.68 km^{2} (5.67 sq mi)
- Elevation: 605 m (1,985 ft)

Population (2011)
  - Total: 233
  - Density: 15.9/km^{2} (41.1/sq mi)
- Time zone: UTC+01:00 (CET)
  - Summer (DST): UTC+02:00 (CEST)
- Postal code: 2864
- SFOS number: 6723
- ISO 3166 code: CH-JU
- Surrounded by: Undervelier, Courfaivre, Courtételle, Châtillon, Moutier(BE), Perrefitte(BE), Souboz(BE)
- Website: www.haute-sorne.ch

Soulce (French pronunciation: [suls]) is a former municipality in the district of Delémont in the canton of Jura in Switzerland. On 1 January 2013 the former municipalities of Bassecourt, Courfaivre, Glovelier, Soulce and Undervelier merged to form the new municipality of Haute-Sorne.

== History ==
Soulce is first mentioned in 1148 as Sulza. The municipality was formerly known by its German name Sulz, however, that name is no longer used.

== Geography ==
Soulce had an area of 14.77 km^{2} (5.70 sq mi). Of this area, 3.98 km^{2} (1.54 mi^{2}) or 26.9% is used for agricultural purposes, while 10.44 km^{2} (4.03 mi^{2}) or 70.7% is forested. Of the rest of the land, 0.28 km^{2} (0.11 mi^{2}) or 1.9% is settled (buildings or roads), 0.01 km^{2} (2.5 acres) or 0.1% is either rivers or lakes and 0.04 km^{2} (9.9 acres) or 0.3% is unproductive land.

Of the built up area, housing and buildings made up 1.1% and transportation infrastructure made up 0.7%. Out of the forested land, 67.6% of the total land area is heavily forested and 3.1% is covered with orchards or small clusters of trees. Of the agricultural land, 5.8% is used for growing crops and 10.3% is pastures and 10.7% is used for alpine pastures. All the water in the municipality is flowing water.

The former municipality is located in the Delemont district, in a small valley east of Undervelier. The village grew up along a small stream in the valley.

== Coat of arms ==
The blazon of the municipal coat of arms is Or, on Coupeaux Vert a Greyhound Gules passant.

== Demographics ==
Soulce had a population (as of 2011) of 233. As of 2008, 3.6% of the population are resident foreign nationals. Over the last 10 years (2000–2010) the population has changed at a rate of 5.3%. Migration accounted for 3.7%, while births and deaths accounted for 4.9%.

Most of the population (as of 2000) speaks French (210 or 89.4%) as their first language, German is the second most common (22 or 9.4%) and Italian is the third (1 or 0.4%).

As of 2008, the population was 48.8% male and 51.2% female. The population was made up of 114 Swiss men (44.5% of the population) and 11 (4.3%) non-Swiss men. There were 126 Swiss women (49.2%) and 5 (2.0%) non-Swiss women. Of the population in the municipality, 99 or about 42.1% were born in Soulce and lived there in 2000. There were 70 or 29.8% who were born in the same canton, while 48 or 20.4% were born somewhere else in Switzerland, and 18 or 7.7% were born outside of Switzerland.

As of 2000, children and teenagers (0–19 years old) make up 26.4% of the population, while adults (20–64 years old) make up 56.2% and seniors (over 64 years old) make up 17.4%.

As of 2000, there were 93 people who were single and never married in the municipality. There were 116 married individuals, 16 widows or widowers and 10 individuals who are divorced.

As of 2000, there were 95 private households in the municipality, and an average of 2.4 persons per household. There were 28 households that consist of only one person and 9 households with five or more people. In 2000, a total of 95 apartments (82.6% of the total) were permanently occupied, while 18 apartments (15.7%) were seasonally occupied and 2 apartments (1.7%) were empty. The vacancy rate for the municipality, in 2010, was 5.04%.

The historical population is given in the following chart:

== Sights ==
The entire village of Soulce is designated as part of the Inventory of Swiss Heritage Sites.

== Politics ==
In the 2007 federal election the most popular party was the SVP which received 38.17% of the vote. The next three most popular parties were the SPS (36.56%), the CVP (11.83%) and the FDP (6.99%). In the federal election, a total of 94 votes were cast, and the voter turnout was 54.0%.

== Economy ==
As of 2010, Soulce had an unemployment rate of 5%. As of 2008, there were 17 people employed in the primary economic sector and about 6 businesses involved in this sector. 1 person was employed in the secondary sector and there was 1 business in this sector. 14 people were employed in the tertiary sector, with 5 businesses in this sector. There were 104 residents of the municipality who were employed in some capacity, of which females made up 38.5% of the workforce.

In 2008 the total number of full-time equivalent jobs was 21. The number of jobs in the primary sector was 13, all of which were in agriculture. The number of jobs in the secondary sector was 1, all of which were in construction. The number of jobs in the tertiary sector was 7. In the tertiary sector; 2 or 28.6% were in wholesale or retail sales or the repair of motor vehicles, 2 or 28.6% were in the movement and storage of goods, 2 or 28.6% were in education.

In 2000, there were 4 workers who commuted into the municipality and 73 workers who commuted away. The municipality is a net exporter of workers, with about 18.3 workers leaving the municipality for every one entering. Of the working population, 6.7% used public transportation to get to work, and 67.3% used a private car.

== Religion ==
From the 2000 census, 171 or 72.8% were Roman Catholic, while 20 or 8.5% belonged to the Swiss Reformed Church. Of the rest of the population, there were 16 individuals (or about 6.81% of the population) who belonged to another Christian church. There was 1 individual who was Islamic. 34 (or about 14.47% of the population) belonged to no church, are agnostic or atheist, and 1 individuals (or about 0.43% of the population) did not answer the question.

== Education ==
In Soulce about 74 or (31.5%) of the population have completed non-mandatory upper secondary education, and 17 or (7.2%) have completed additional higher education (either university or a Fachhochschule). Of the 17 who completed tertiary schooling, 58.8% were Swiss men, 35.3% were Swiss women.

The Canton of Jura school system provides two year of non-obligatory Kindergarten, followed by six years of Primary school. This is followed by three years of obligatory lower Secondary school where the students are separated according to ability and aptitude. Following the lower Secondary students may attend a three or four year optional upper Secondary school followed by some form of Tertiary school or they may enter an apprenticeship.

During the 2009-10 school year, there were no students attending school in Soulce.

As of 2000, there were 8 students in Soulce who came from another municipality, while 23 residents attended schools outside the municipality.
