= Courfaivre =

- Former municipality
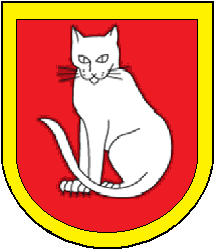
- Coat of arms
- Location of Courfaivre
- Location within Switzerland Location within Canton of Jura
- Coordinates: 47°20′N 07°17′E
- Country: Switzerland
- Canton: Jura
- District: Delémont

Government
  - Mayor: Germaine Monnerat

Area
  - Total: 12.40 km^{2} (4.79 sq mi)
- Elevation: 460 m (1,510 ft)

Population (December 2011)
  - Total: 1,618
  - Density: 130.5/km^{2} (338.0/sq mi)
- Demonym: Mergats
- Time zone: UTC+01:00 (CET)
  - Summer (DST): UTC+02:00 (CEST)
- Postal code: 2853
- SFOS number: 464
- ISO 3166 code: CH-JU
- Surrounded by: Bassecourt, Develier, Courtételle, Soulce, Undervelier
- Website: www.haute-sorne.ch

Courfaivre (French pronunciation: [kuʁfɛvʁ]; Frainc-Comtou: Cofaivre) is a former municipality in the district of Delémont in the canton of Jura in Switzerland. On 1 January 2013 the former municipalities of Bassecourt, Courfaivre, Glovelier, Soulce and Undervelier merged to form the new municipality of Haute-Sorne.

== History ==
Courfaivre is first mentioned in 1147 as Curfavro.

== Geography ==
Aerial view (1955)

Courfaivre had an area of 12.4 km^{2} (4.79 sq mi). Of this area, 6.33 km^{2} (2.44 mi^{2}) or 51.0% is used for agricultural purposes, while 4.91 km^{2} (1.90 mi^{2}) or 39.6% is forested. Of the rest of the land, 1.04 km^{2} (0.40 mi^{2}) or 8.4% is settled (buildings or roads), 0.07 km^{2} (17 acres) or 0.6% is either rivers or lakes and 0.06 km^{2} (15 acres) or 0.5% is unproductive land.

Of the built up area, housing and buildings made up 4.2% and transportation infrastructure made up 3.1%. Out of the forested land, 37.0% of the total land area is heavily forested and 2.6% is covered with orchards or small clusters of trees. Of the agricultural land, 29.0% is used for growing crops and 16.9% is pastures and 4.5% is used for alpine pastures. All the water in the municipality is flowing water.

The former municipality is located in the Delemont district, on the Delemont-Glovelier road on the right bank of the Sorne river.

== Coat of arms ==
The blazon of the municipal coat of arms is Gules bordered Or, a Cat Argent sejant guardant.

== Demographics ==
Courfaivre had a population (as of 2011) of 1,618. As of 2008, 9.7% of the population are resident foreign nationals. Over the last 10 years (2000–2010) the population has changed at a rate of 1.7%. Migration accounted for -2.6%, while births and deaths accounted for 2.4%.

Most of the population (as of 2000) speaks French (1,412 or 91.9%) as their first language, German is the second most common (48 or 3.1%) and Italian is the third (27 or 1.8%).

As of 2008, the population was 48.6% male and 51.4% female. The population was made up of 683 Swiss men (43.0% of the population) and 89 (5.6%) non-Swiss men. There were 739 Swiss women (46.5%) and 77 (4.8%) non-Swiss women. Of the population in the municipality, 542 or about 35.3% were born in Courfaivre and lived there in 2000. There were 511 or 33.2% who were born in the same canton, while 202 or 13.1% were born somewhere else in Switzerland, and 218 or 14.2% were born outside of Switzerland.

As of 2000, children and teenagers (0–19 years old) make up 27.1% of the population, while adults (20–64 years old) make up 58.7% and seniors (over 64 years old) make up 14.2%.

As of 2000, there were 617 people who were single and never married in the municipality. There were 779 married individuals, 88 widows or widowers and 53 individuals who are divorced.

As of 2000, there were 579 private households in the municipality, and an average of 2.6 persons per household. There were 138 households that consist of only one person and 55 households with five or more people. In 2000, a total of 568 apartments (88.5% of the total) were permanently occupied, while 47 apartments (7.3%) were seasonally occupied and 27 apartments (4.2%) were empty. As of 2009, the construction rate of new housing units was 1.3 new units per 1000 residents. The vacancy rate for the municipality, in 2010, was 3.65%.

The historical population is given in the following chart:

== Heritage sites of national significance ==
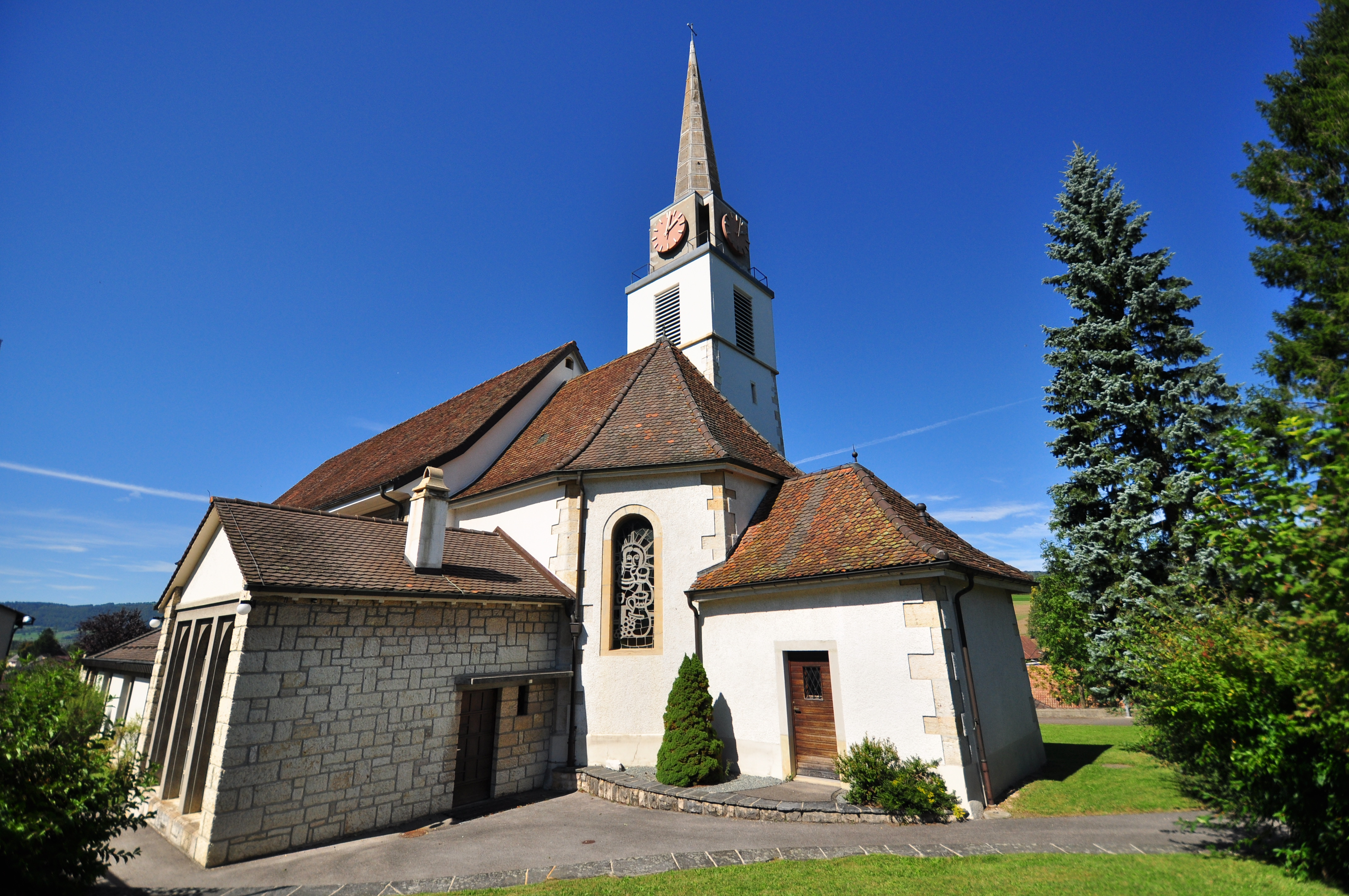
St-Germain-D‘Auxerre Church

The St-Germain-D‘Auxerre Church is listed as a Swiss heritage site of national significance.

== Politics ==
In the 2007 federal election the most popular party was the SPS which received 38.59% of the vote. The next three most popular parties were the SVP (20.6%), the CVP (17.37%) and the CSP (14.76%). In the federal election, a total of 413 votes were cast, and the voter turnout was 38.6%.

== Economy ==
As of 2010, Courfaivre had an unemployment rate of 5.3%. As of 2008, there were 49 people employed in the primary economic sector and about 14 businesses involved in this sector. 117 people were employed in the secondary sector and there were 21 businesses in this sector. 127 people were employed in the tertiary sector, with 29 businesses in this sector. There were 770 residents of the municipality who were employed in some capacity, of which females made up 41.4% of the workforce.

In 2008 the total number of full-time equivalent jobs was 249. The number of jobs in the primary sector was 33, all of which were in agriculture. The number of jobs in the secondary sector was 113 of which 77 or (68.1%) were in manufacturing and 35 (31.0%) were in construction. The number of jobs in the tertiary sector was 103. In the tertiary sector; 44 or 42.7% were in wholesale or retail sales or the repair of motor vehicles, 6 or 5.8% were in the movement and storage of goods, 7 or 6.8% were in a hotel or restaurant, 11 or 10.7% were the insurance or financial industry, 8 or 7.8% were technical professionals or scientists, 13 or 12.6% were in education.

In 2000, there were 221 workers who commuted into the municipality and 566 workers who commuted away. The municipality is a net exporter of workers, with about 2.6 workers leaving the municipality for every one entering. About 7.7% of the workforce coming into Courfaivre are coming from outside Switzerland. Of the working population, 9.9% used public transportation to get to work, and 70.3% used a private car.

== Religion ==
From the 2000 census, 1,153 or 75.0% were Roman Catholic, while 139 or 9.0% belonged to the Swiss Reformed Church. Of the rest of the population, there were 2 members of an Orthodox church (or about 0.13% of the population), there was 1 individual who belongs to the Christian Catholic Church, and there were 74 individuals (or about 4.81% of the population) who belonged to another Christian church. There were 32 (or about 2.08% of the population) who were Islamic. There were 8 individuals who were Buddhist and 2 individuals who belonged to another church. 88 (or about 5.73% of the population) belonged to no church, are agnostic or atheist, and 75 individuals (or about 4.88% of the population) did not answer the question.

== Transport ==
Courfaivre sits on the Delémont–Delle line and is served by trains at Courfaivre railway station.

== Education ==
In Courfaivre about 533 or (34.7%) of the population have completed non-mandatory upper secondary education, and 108 or (7.0%) have completed additional higher education (either university or a Fachhochschule). Of the 108 who completed tertiary schooling, 64.8% were Swiss men, 23.1% were Swiss women, 6.5% were non-Swiss men and 5.6% were non-Swiss women.

The Canton of Jura school system provides two year of non-obligatory Kindergarten, followed by six years of Primary school. This is followed by three years of obligatory lower Secondary school where the students are separated according to ability and aptitude. Following the lower Secondary students may attend a three or four year optional upper Secondary school followed by some form of Tertiary school or they may enter an apprenticeship.

During the 2009–10 school year, there were a total of 162 students attending 9 classes in Courfaivre. There were 2 kindergarten classes with a total of 34 students in the municipality. The municipality had 7 primary classes and 128 students. There are only nine Secondary schools in the canton, so all the students from Courfaivre attend their secondary school in another municipality. As of 2000, there were 124 students from Courfaivre who attended schools outside the municipality.
