= Reconvilier railway station =

Railway station in Reconvilier, Switzerland

Reconvilier
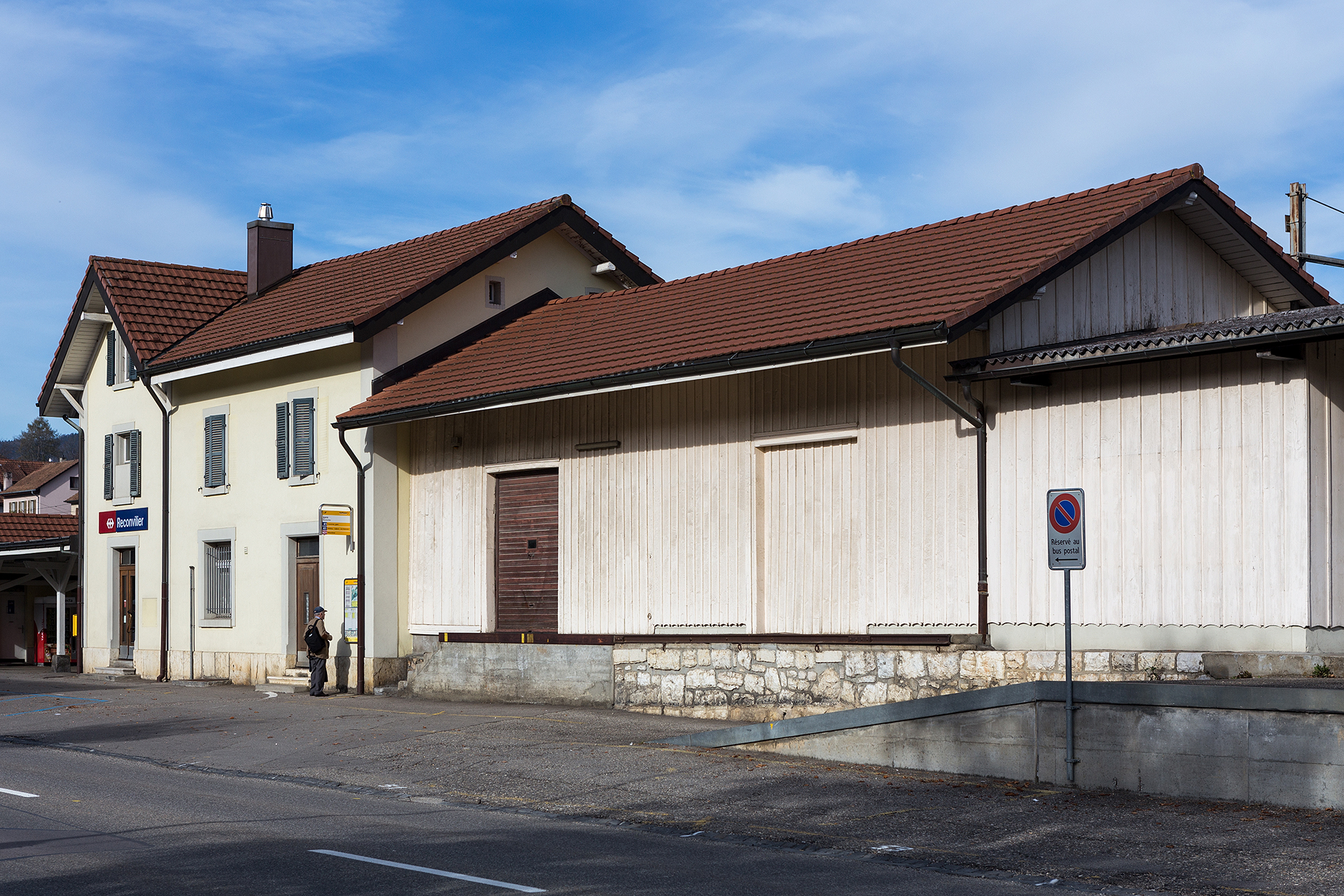
- The station building in 2017

General information
- Location: Reconvilier; Switzerland
- Coordinates: 47°14′07″N 7°13′39″E
- Elevation: 728 m (2,388 ft)
- Owner: Swiss Federal Railways
- Line: Sonceboz-Sombeval–Moutier line
- Distance: 58.0 km (36.0 mi) from Bern
- Platforms: 2
- Tracks: 3
- Train operators: Swiss Federal Railways
- Connections: CarPostal SA buses

Construction
- Cycle facilities: Yes (10 spaces)
- Accessible: No

Other information
- Station code: 8500101 (REC)
- Fare zone: 342 (Libero)

Passengers
- 2023: 570 per weekday (SBB)

Services
Preceding station	SBB CFF FFS	Following station
Pontenet towards Malleray-Bévilard or Moutier	R42	Tavannes towards Biel/Bienne
Pontenet towards Moutier	R42	Tavannes towards Sonceboz-Sombeval
Location

Reconvilier railway station (French: Gare de Reconvilier) is a railway station in the municipality of Reconvilier, in the Swiss canton of Bern. It is an intermediate stop on the standard gauge Sonceboz-Sombeval–Moutier line of Swiss Federal Railways.

== Services ==
As of the December 2024 timetable change, the following services stop at Reconvilier:

- Regio: hourly service between Moutier and Biel/Bienne; increases to half-hourly on weekdays between Malleray-Bévilard and Sonceboz-Sombeval at various times during the day.
