= Sorvilier railway station =

Railway station in Sorvilier, Switzerland

Sorvilier
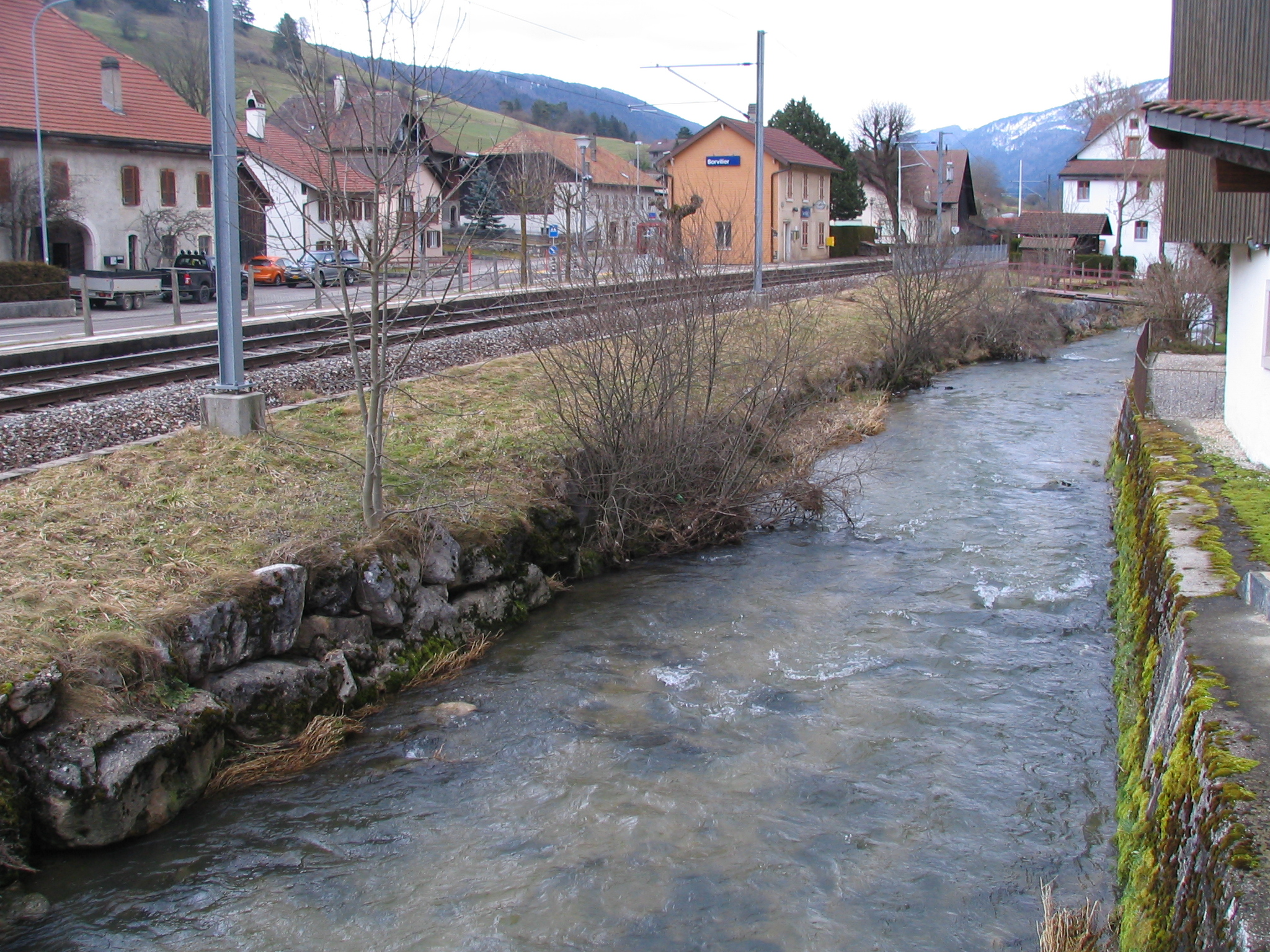
- The station building in 2014, next to the Birs

General information
- Location: Sorvilier; Switzerland
- Coordinates: 47°14′21″N 7°18′21″E
- Elevation: 681 m (2,234 ft)
- Owner: Swiss Federal Railways
- Line: Sonceboz-Sombeval–Moutier line
- Distance: 64.2 km (39.9 mi) from Bern
- Platforms: 1 side platform
- Tracks: 1
- Train operators: Swiss Federal Railways

Construction
- Accessible: No

Other information
- Station code: 8500103 (SOR)
- Fare zone: 343 (Libero)

Passengers
- 2023: 70 per weekday (SBB)

Services
Preceding station	SBB CFF FFS	Following station
Court towards Moutier	R42	Malleray-Bévilard towards Biel/Bienne
Court towards Moutier	R42	Malleray-Bévilard towards Sonceboz-Sombeval
Location

Sorvilier railway station (French: Gare de Sorvilier) is a railway station in the municipality of Sorvilier, in the Swiss canton of Bern. It is an intermediate stop on the standard gauge Sonceboz-Sombeval–Moutier line of Swiss Federal Railways.

== Services ==
As of the December 2024 timetable change, the following services stop at Sorvilier:

- Regio: hourly service between Moutier and Sonceboz-Sombeval or Biel/Bienne.
