= Pontenet railway station =

Railway station in Valbirse, Switzerland

Pontenet
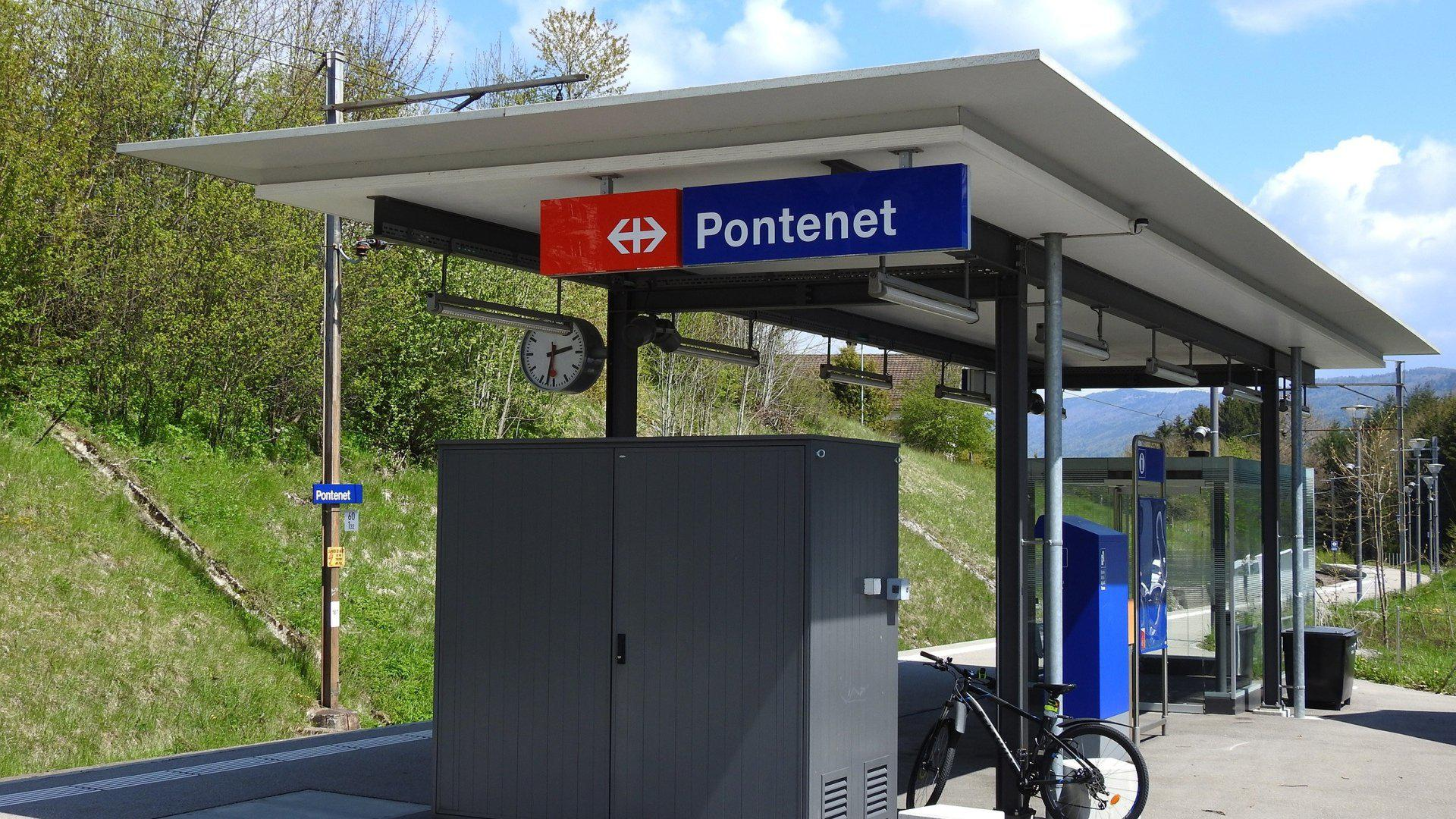
- The station platform in 2018

General information
- Location: Valbirse; Switzerland
- Coordinates: 47°14′20″N 7°15′15″E
- Elevation: 712 m (2,336 ft)
- Owner: Swiss Federal Railways
- Line: Sonceboz-Sombeval–Moutier line
- Distance: 60.1 km (37.3 mi) from Bern
- Platforms: 1 side platform
- Tracks: 1
- Train operators: Swiss Federal Railways

Construction
- Accessible: Partly

Other information
- Station code: 8500135 (PON)
- Fare zone: 342 (Libero)

Passengers
- 2023: 60 per weekday (SBB)

Services
Preceding station	SBB CFF FFS	Following station
Malleray-Bévilard towards Moutier	R42	Reconvilier towards Biel/Bienne
Malleray-Bévilard Terminus	R42	Reconvilier towards Biel/Bienne
Malleray-Bévilard towards Moutier	R42	Reconvilier towards Sonceboz-Sombeval
Location

Pontenet railway station (French: Gare de Pontenet) is a railway station in the municipality of Valbirse, in the Swiss canton of Bern. It is an intermediate stop on the standard gauge Sonceboz-Sombeval–Moutier line of Swiss Federal Railways.

== Services ==
As of the December 2024 timetable change, the following services stop at Pontenet:

- Regio: hourly service between Moutier and Biel/Bienne; increases to half-hourly on weekdays between Malleray-Bévilard and Sonceboz-Sombeval at various times during the day.
