= Court railway station =

Railway station in Court, Bern, Switzerland

Court
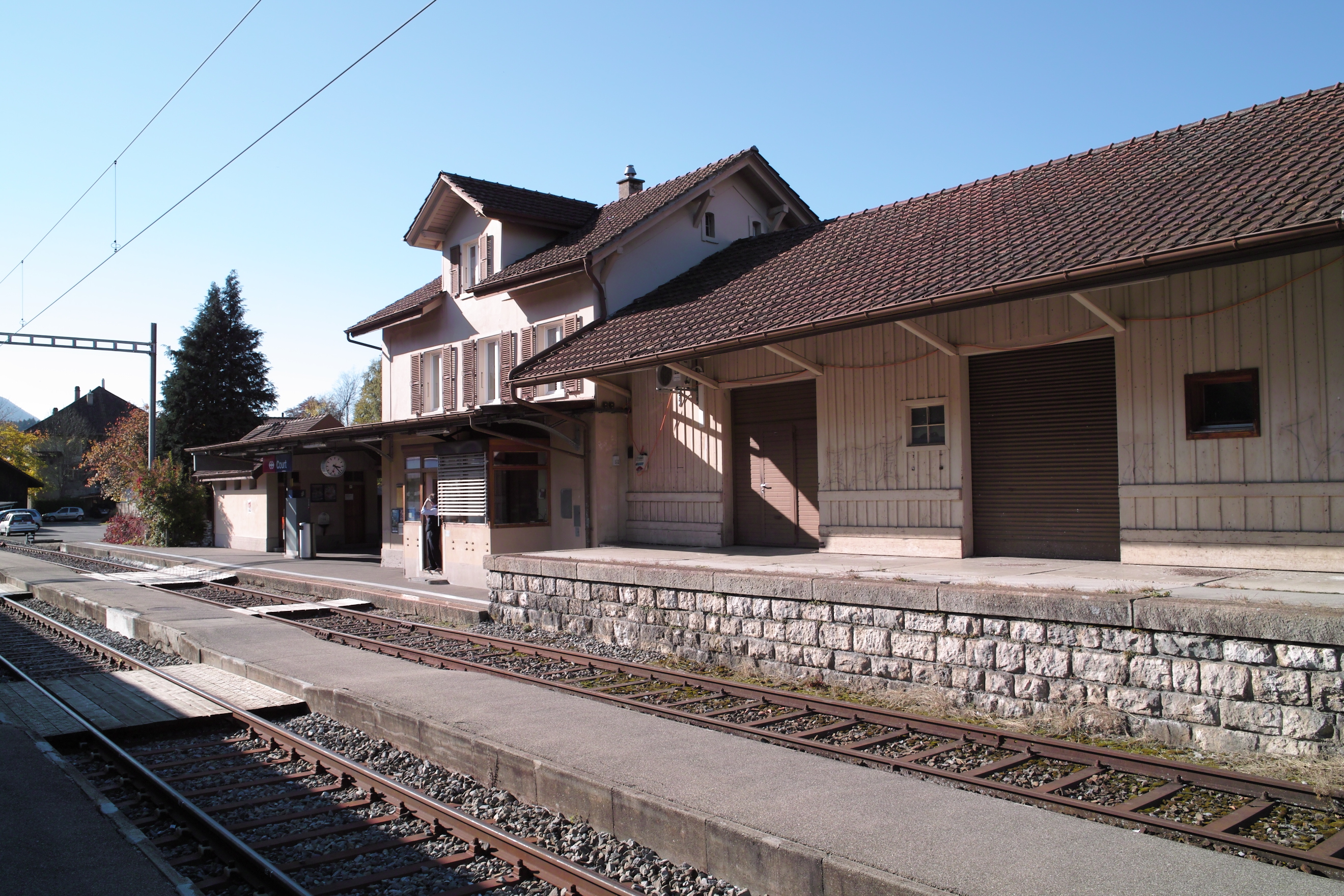
- The station in 2011

General information
- Location: Court; Switzerland
- Coordinates: 47°14′26″N 7°20′32″E
- Elevation: 666 m (2,185 ft)
- Owner: Swiss Federal Railways
- Line: Sonceboz-Sombeval–Moutier line
- Distance: 67.0 km (41.6 mi) from Bern
- Platforms: 2
- Tracks: 3
- Train operators: Swiss Federal Railways

Construction
- Parking: Yes (3 spaces)
- Cycle facilities: Yes (4 spaces)
- Accessible: No

Other information
- Station code: 8500104 (CT)
- Fare zone: 343 (Libero)

Passengers
- 2023: 260 per weekday (SBB)

Services
Preceding station	SBB CFF FFS	Following station
Moutier Terminus	R42	Sorvilier towards Biel/Bienne
Moutier Terminus	R42	Sorvilier towards Sonceboz-Sombeval
Location

Court railway station (French: Gare de Court) is a railway station in the municipality of Court, in the Swiss canton of Bern. It is an intermediate stop on the standard gauge Sonceboz-Sombeval–Moutier line of Swiss Federal Railways.

== Services ==
As of the December 2024 timetable change, the following services stop at Court:

- Regio: hourly service between Moutier and Sonceboz-Sombeval or Biel/Bienne.
