= Tramelan-Dessous railway station =

Railway station in Tramelan, Switzerland

Tramelan-Dessous
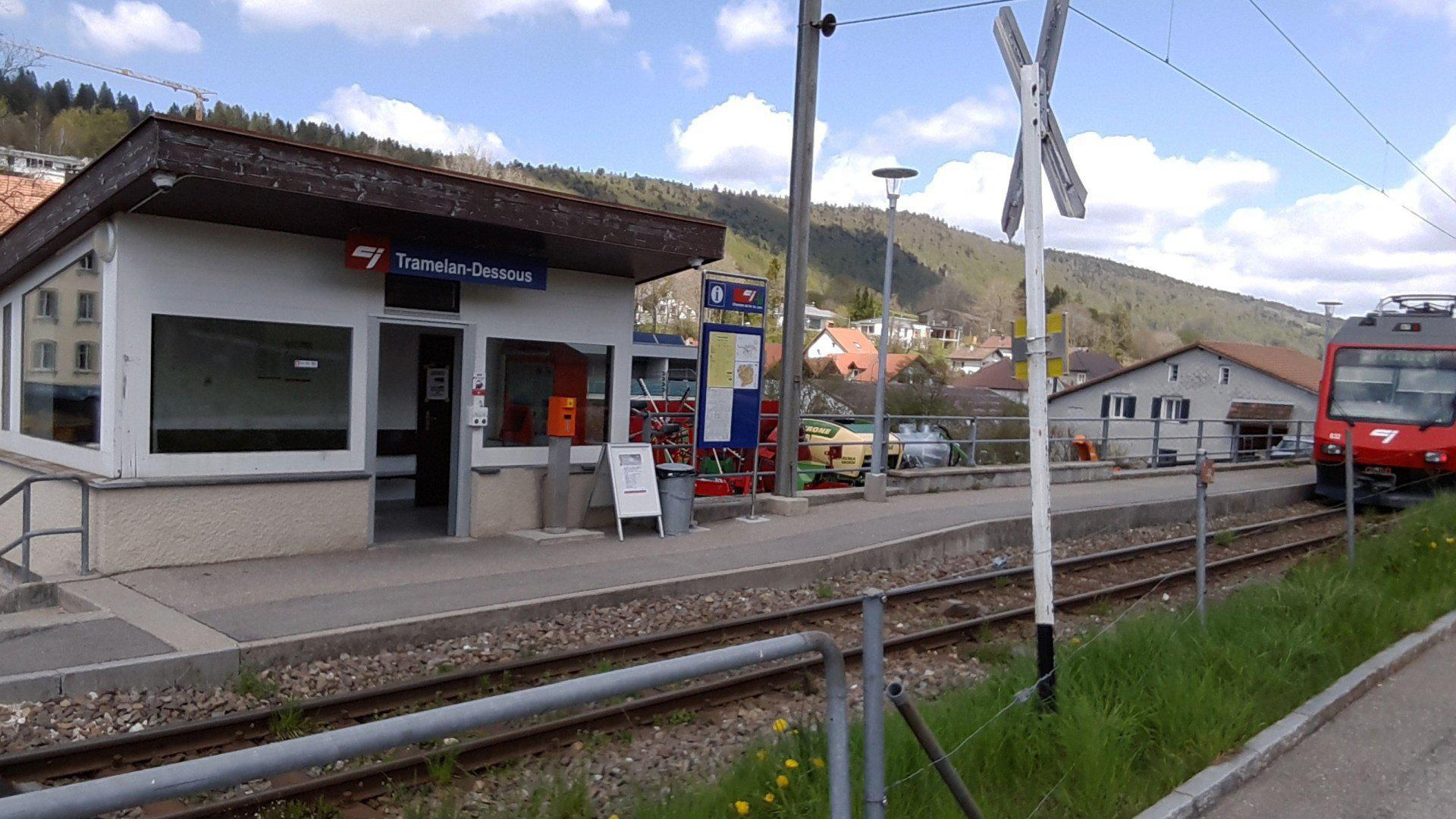
- The station in 2019

General information
- Location: Tramelan, Bern; Switzerland
- Coordinates: 47°13′19″N 7°06′47″E
- Elevation: 881 m (2,890 ft)
- Owner: Chemins de fer du Jura
- Line: Tavannes–Noirmont
- Distance: 8.0 km (5.0 mi) from Tavannes
- Platforms: 1 side platform
- Tracks: 1
- Train operators: Chemins de fer du Jura

Construction
- Accessible: Yes

Other information
- Station code: 8500162 (TRDE)
- Fare zone: 41 (Vagabond); 351 (Libero)

Services
Preceding station	Chemins de fer du Jura	Following station
Tramelan towards Le Noirmont	R37	Tavannes Terminus
Location

Tramelan-Dessous railway station (French: Gare de Tramelan-Dessous) is a railway station in the municipality of Tramelan, in the Swiss canton of Bern. It is an intermediate stop and a request stop on the 1,000 mm (3 ft 3 3/8 in) metre gauge Tavannes–Noirmont railway line of Chemins de fer du Jura.

== Services ==
As of the December 2023 timetable change, the following services stop at Tramelan-Dessous:

- Regio: hourly service (half-hourly on weekdays) between Tavannes and Tramelan, hourly service to Le Noirmont. Connections are made in Le Noirmont for La Chaux-de-Fonds and Saignelégier, and in Tavannes for Sonceboz-Sombeval, Biel/Bienne, and Moutier.
