= Malleray-Bévilard railway station =

Railway station in Valbirse, Bern, Switzerland

Malleray-Bévilard
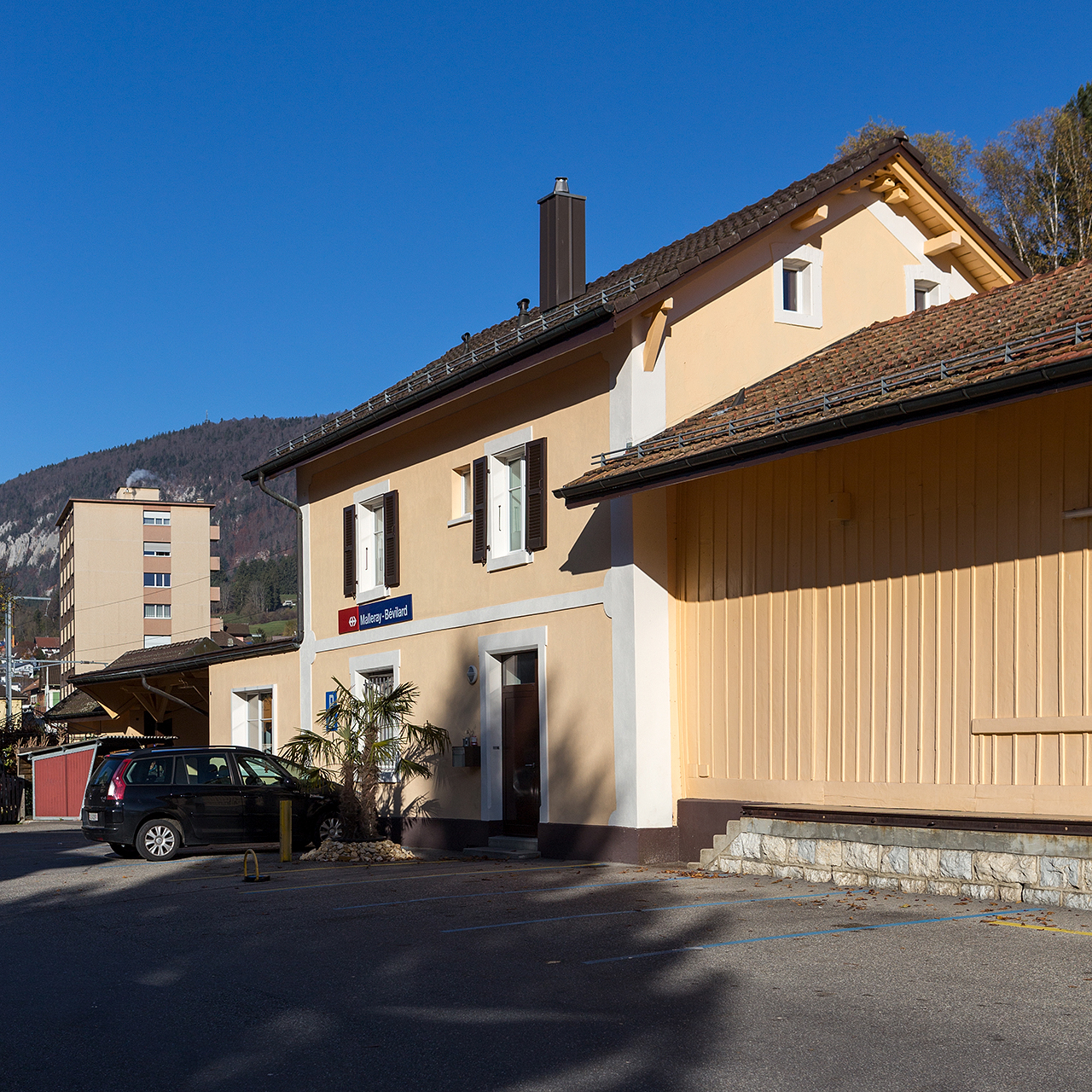
- The station building in 2017

General information
- Location: Valbirse; Switzerland
- Coordinates: 47°14′19″N 7°16′33″E
- Elevation: 698 m (2,290 ft)
- Owner: Swiss Federal Railways
- Line: Sonceboz-Sombeval–Moutier line
- Distance: 61.8 km (38.4 mi) from Bern
- Platforms: 2
- Tracks: 2
- Train operators: Swiss Federal Railways

Construction
- Parking: Yes (6 spaces)
- Cycle facilities: Yes (8 spaces)
- Accessible: No

Other information
- Station code: 8500102 (MB)
- Fare zone: 342 (Libero)

Passengers
- 2023: 780 per weekday (SBB)

Services
Preceding station	SBB CFF FFS	Following station
Sorvilier towards Moutier	R42	Pontenet towards Biel/Bienne
Terminus	R42	Pontenet towards Biel/Bienne
Sorvilier towards Moutier	R42	Pontenet towards Sonceboz-Sombeval
Location

Malleray-Bévilard railway station (French: Gare de Malleray-Bévilard) is a railway station in the municipality of Valbirse, in the Swiss canton of Bern. It is an intermediate stop on the standard gauge Sonceboz-Sombeval–Moutier line of Swiss Federal Railways.

== Services ==
As of the December 2024 timetable change, the following services stop at Malleray-Bévilard:

- Regio: hourly service to Moutier and Biel/Bienne; on weekdays service increases to half-hourly to Sonceboz-Sombeval at various times during the day.
