= Reconvilier =

- Municipality
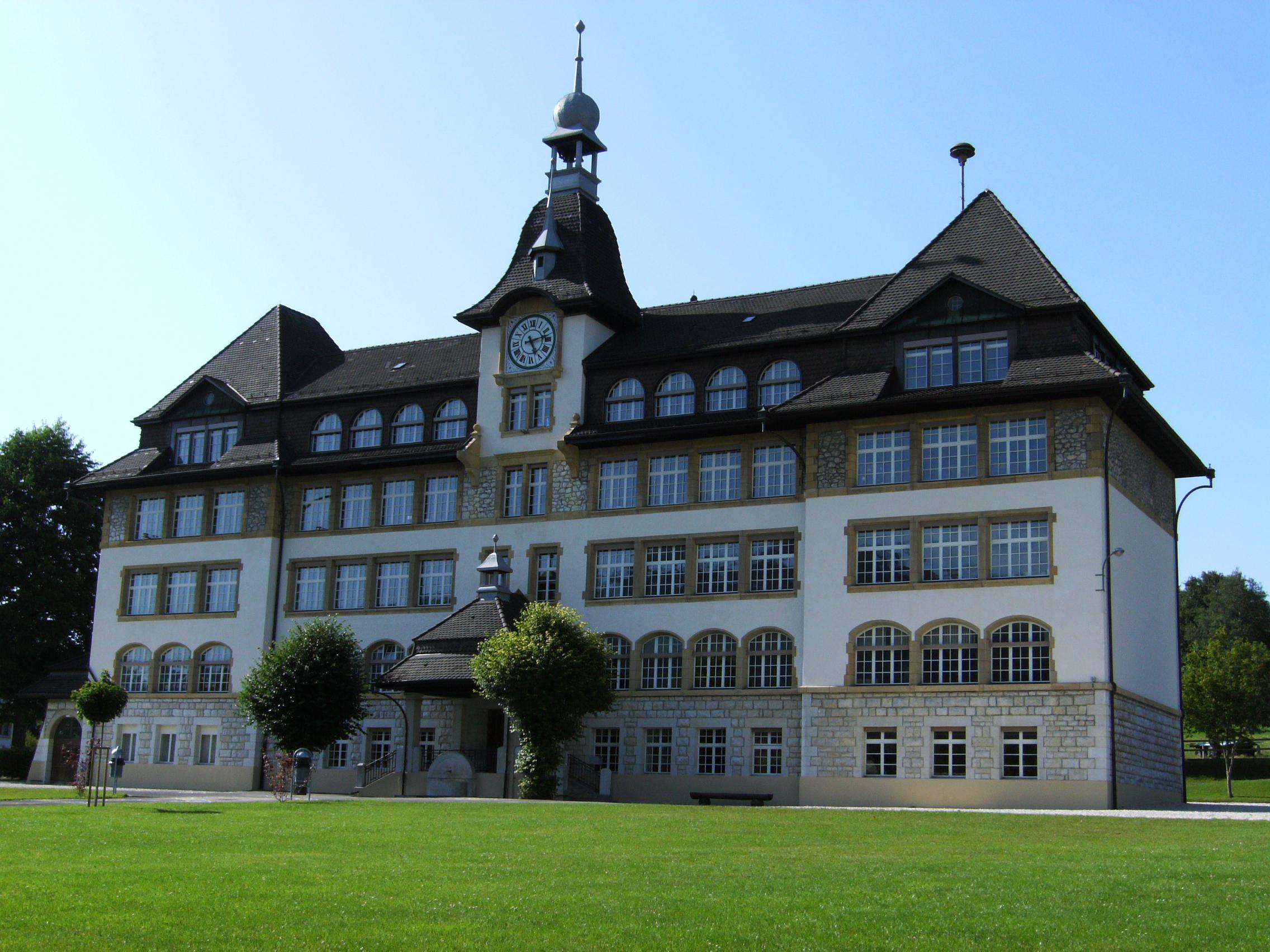
- Primary School of Reconvilier

- Flag Coat of arms
- Location of Reconvilier
- Location within Switzerland Location within Canton of Bern
- Coordinates: 47°14′N 7°13′E
- Country: Switzerland
- Canton: Bern
- District: Jura bernois

Government
  - Mayor: Maire; Daniel Buchser

Area
  - Total: 8.23 km^{2} (3.18 sq mi)
- Elevation: 731 m (2,398 ft)

Population (Dec 2011)
  - Total: 2,187
  - Density: 266/km^{2} (688/sq mi)
- Time zone: UTC+01:00 (CET)
  - Summer (DST): UTC+02:00 (CEST)
- Postal code: 2732
- SFOS number: 703
- ISO 3166 code: CH-BE
- Surrounded by: Tavannes, Saicourt, Saules, Loveresse, Malleray, Péry, La Heutte
- Website: www.reconvilier.ch

Reconvilier is a municipality in the Jura bernois administrative district in the canton of Bern in Switzerland. It is located in the French-speaking Bernese Jura (Jura Bernois).

== History ==
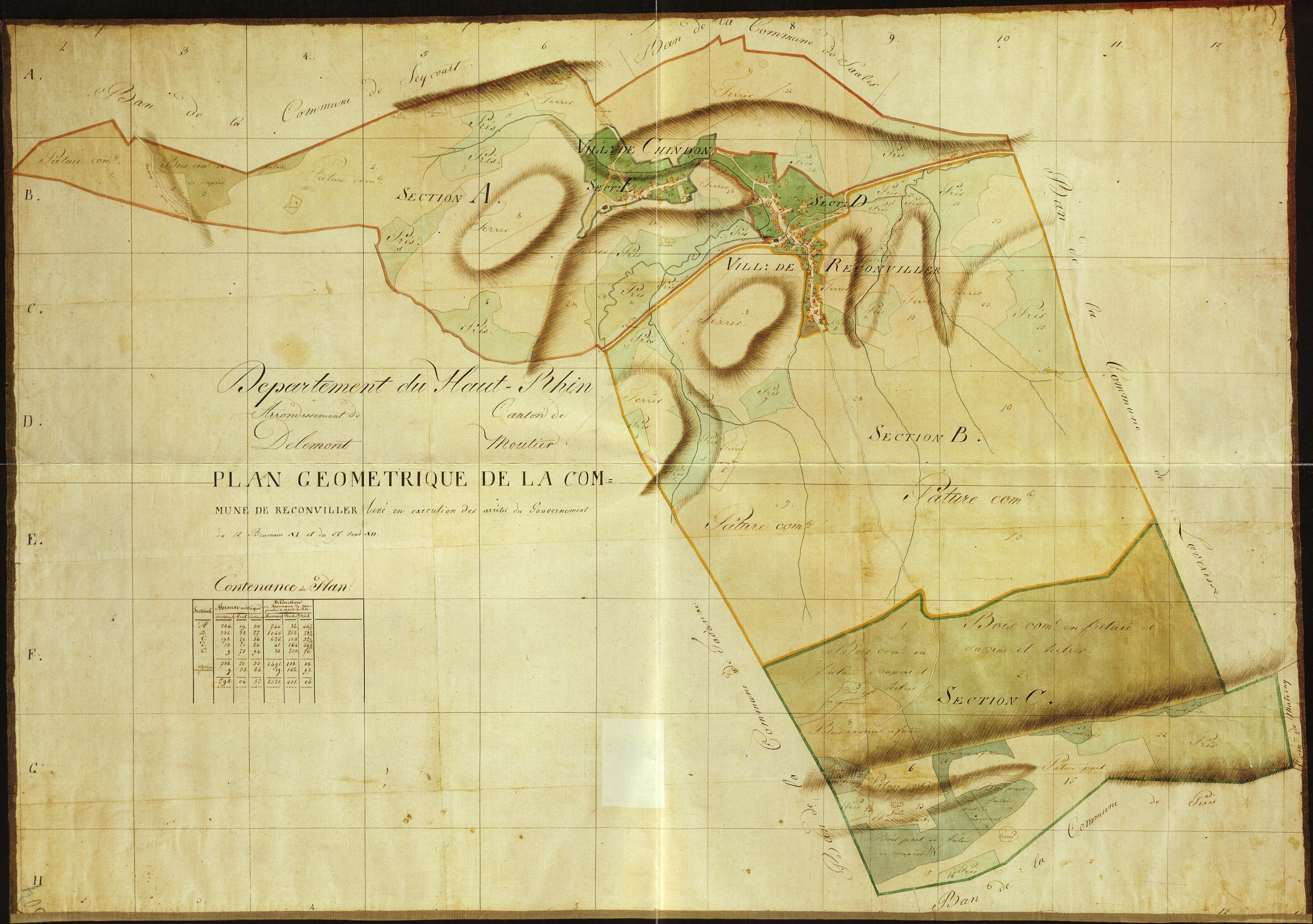
Plan of the municipality from 1800 until 1815, when it was part of the French Département of Haut-Rhin.

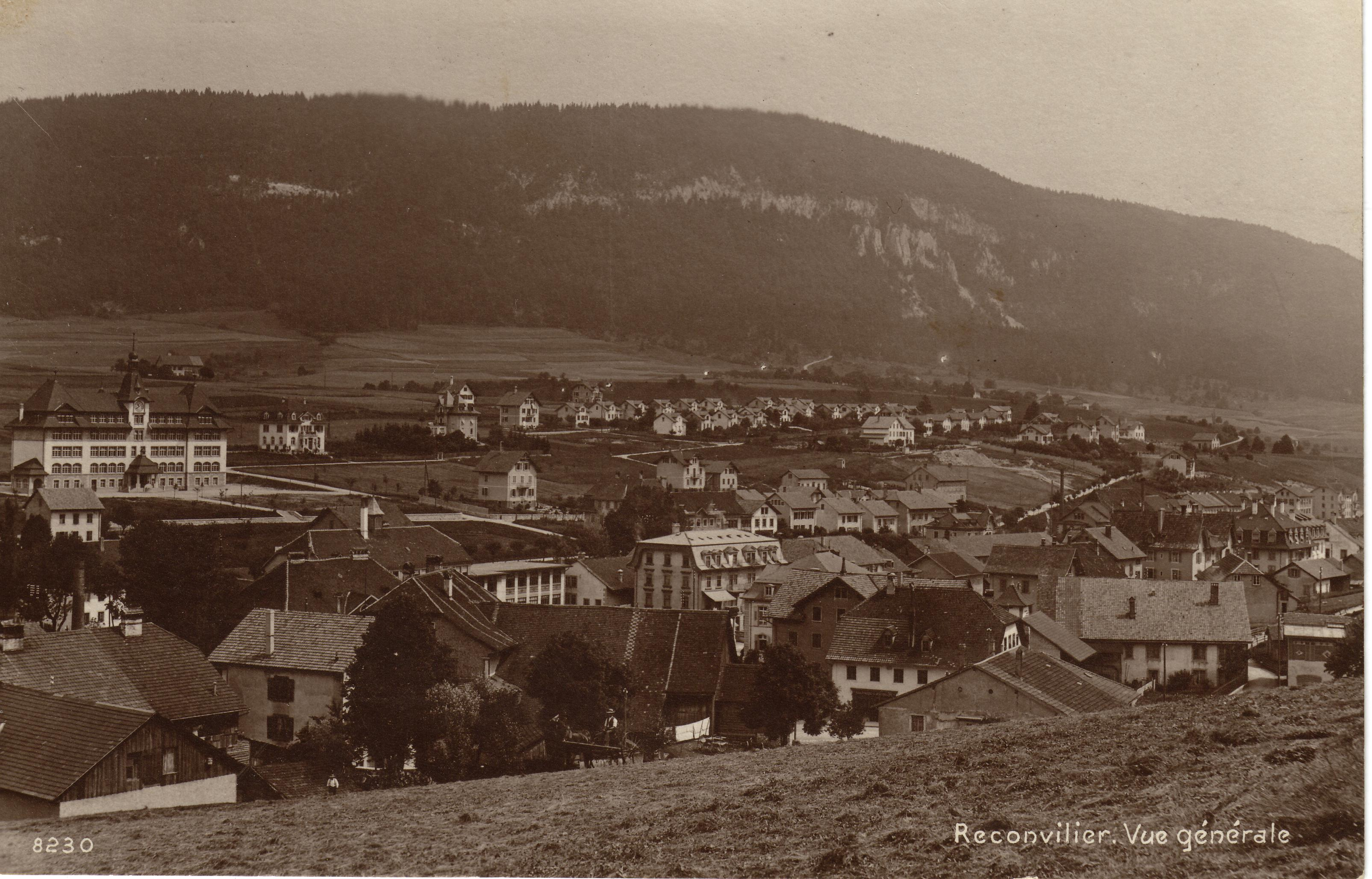
Reconvilier village in 1919

Aerial view (1949)

Reconvilier is first mentioned in 884 as Roconis villare. The former German name Rokwiler is no longer used today.

The oldest trace of a settlement in the area are two ceramic and three bronze bowls which probably come from a Roman villa from the 2nd or 3rd century. In 884, the village appears as an estate belonging to Moutier-Grandval Abbey. The noble Reconvilier family appears in historical records beginning in the 12th century and lasting until the 15th. The village remained under the Abbey's control until it was secularized around 1531. Then Reconvilier came under the authority of the provost of Moutier-Grandval who represented the Prince-Bishop of Basel. After the 1797 French victory and the Treaty of Campo Formio, Reconvilier became part of the French Département of Mont-Terrible. Three years later, in 1800 it became part of the Département of Haut-Rhin. After Napoleon's defeat and the Congress of Vienna, Reconvilier was assigned to the Canton of Bern in 1815.

The Chapel of Saint-Léonard in Chaindon is first mentioned in 962. However, both Reconvilier and Chaindon were part of the parish of Tavannes for most of their history. In 1530, the entire Tavannes parish, including Reconvilier converted to the new faith of the Protestant Reformation. It separated from the parish to form an independent parish in 1908. The current parish church was built as a village church in 1740. It was renovated in 1924-26 and again in 1992.

Industry began to move into the village in the second half of the 19th century. In 1851 the watch parts factory Bueche, Boillat et Cie opened. In 1876 a station on the Basel-Biel railroad opened in Reconvilier. The convenient transportation link allowed the village to expand into an important watchmaking center. The Bueche, Boillat et Cie company changed their name to Générale Watch Co in 1895 and until 1975 it sold Helvetia brand watches. In 1853, the Société horlogère was created. It sold watches under the Reconvilier Watch Company name until 1970. Both factories closed during the Quartz crisis of the 1970s, though the Reconvilier Watch Company name was reincorporated in Zug in 2006. The company now, operates under the name of Société Horlogère Reconvilier AG and besides producing a classic watch line, they have now moved into the business of supplying high-tech, GPS-based watches, which feature distance measurement for golf players. In 1855, Bueche, Boillat et Cie built a foundry to supply metal to the company. After passing through several different owners, it became part of Swissmetal in 1989. Today the manufacturing sector still provides over half of all jobs in the municipality.

== Geography ==
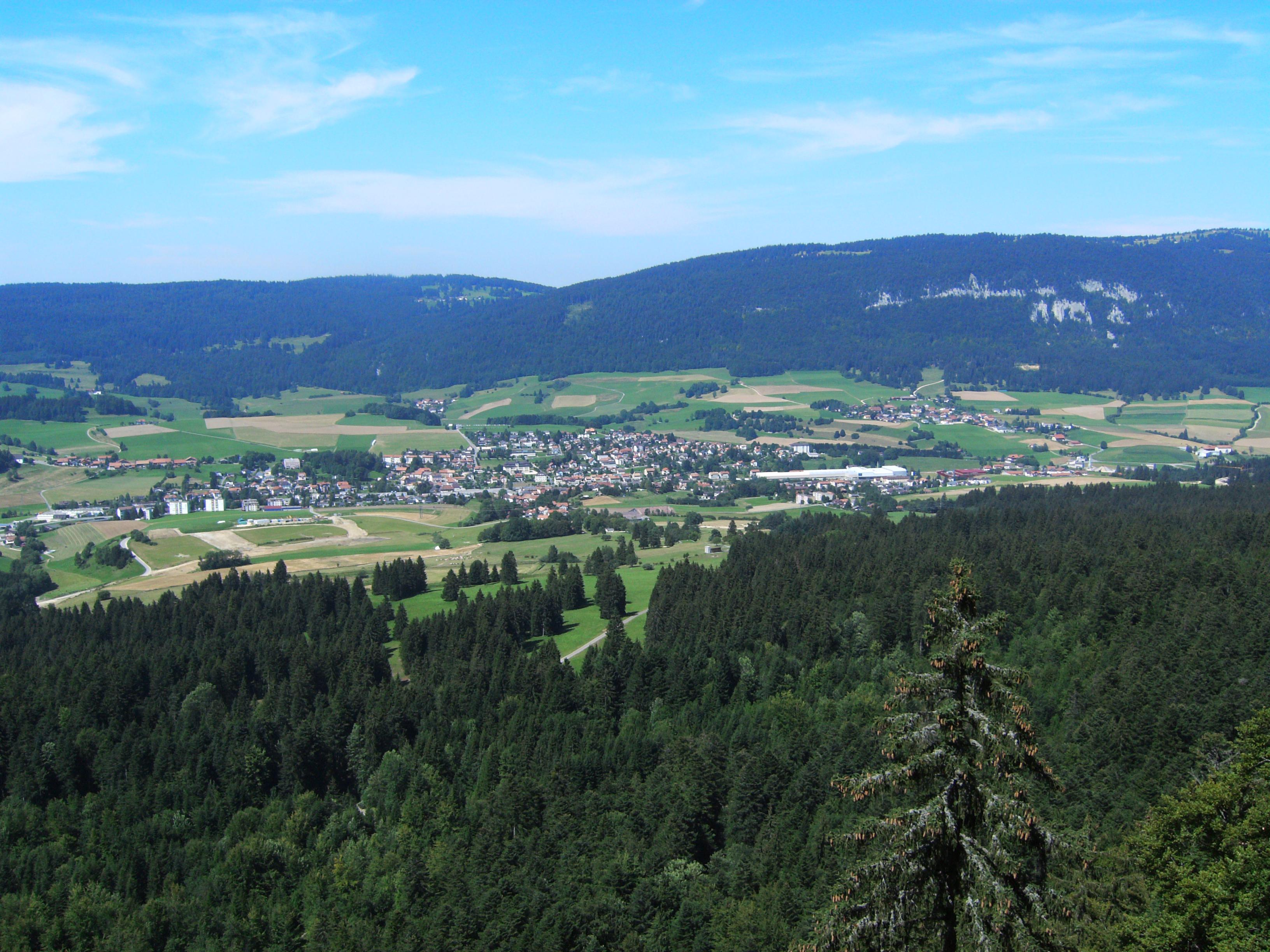
Reconvilier village and surroundings

Reconvilier has an area of 8.25 km^{2} (3.19 sq mi). As of 2012, a total of 3.69 km^{2} (1.42 mi^{2}) or 44.7% is used for agricultural purposes, while 3.46 km^{2} (1.34 mi^{2}) or 41.9% is forested. Of the rest of the land, 1.06 km^{2} (0.41 mi^{2}) or 12.8% is settled (buildings or roads), 0.01 km^{2} (2.5 acres) or 0.1% is either rivers or lakes.

During the same year, industrial buildings made up 1.5% of the total area while housing and buildings made up 7.0% and transportation infrastructure made up 3.3%. Out of the forested land, 37.7% of the total land area is heavily forested and 4.2% is covered with orchards or small clusters of trees. Of the agricultural land, 16.6% is used for growing crops and 14.3% is pastures and 13.2% is used for alpine pastures. All the water in the municipality is flowing water.

The municipality is located in the Tavannes valley. It consists of the village of Reconvilier and the hamlet of Chaindon.

On 31 December 2009 District de Moutier, the municipality's former district, was dissolved. On the following day, 1 January 2010, it joined the newly created Arrondissement administratif Jura bernois.

== Coat of arms ==
The blazon of the municipal coat of arms is Argent a Bend wavy Sable and in chief sinister a Mullet of Five of the same.

== Demographics ==
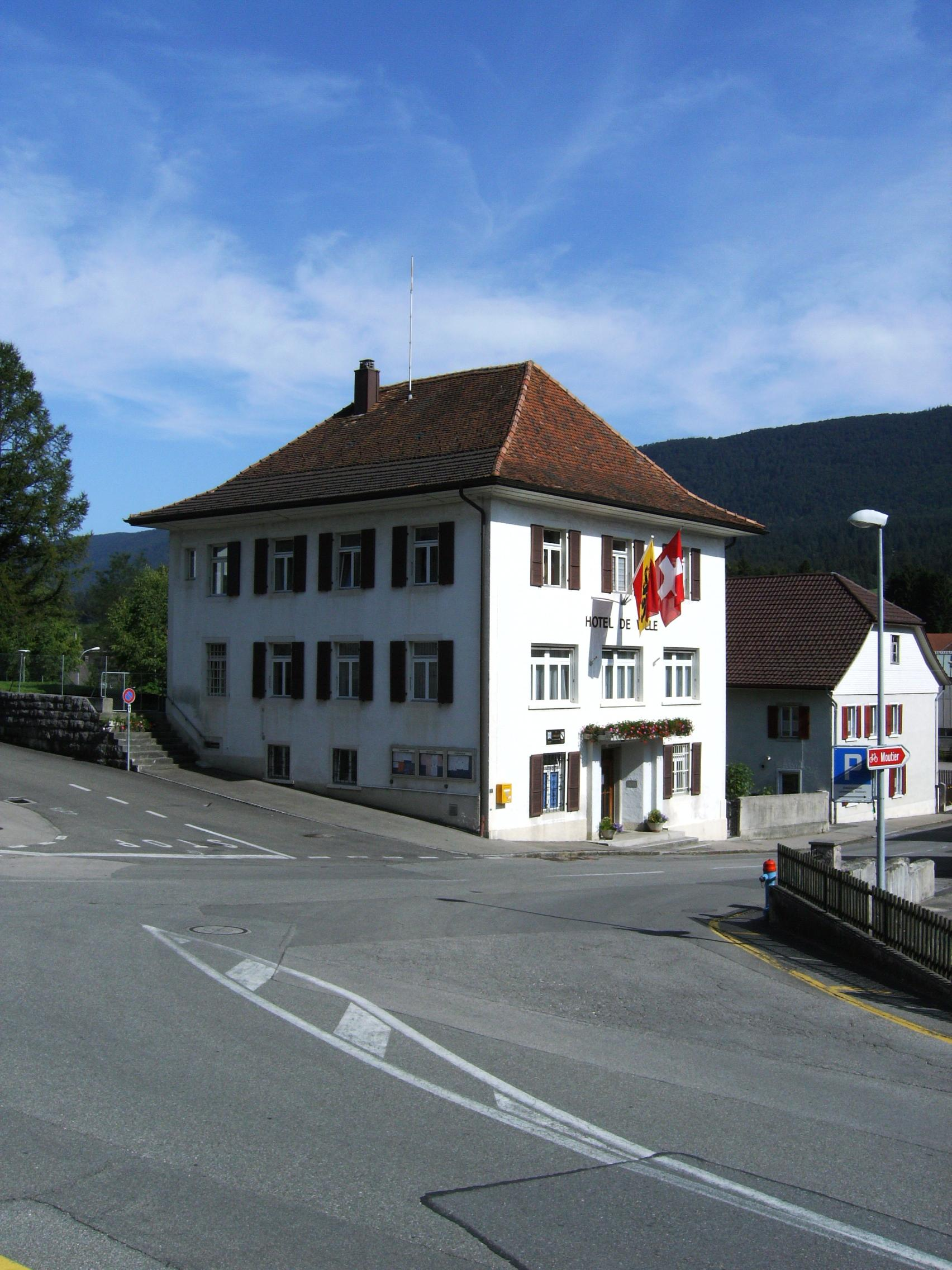
Municipal administration building of Reconvilier

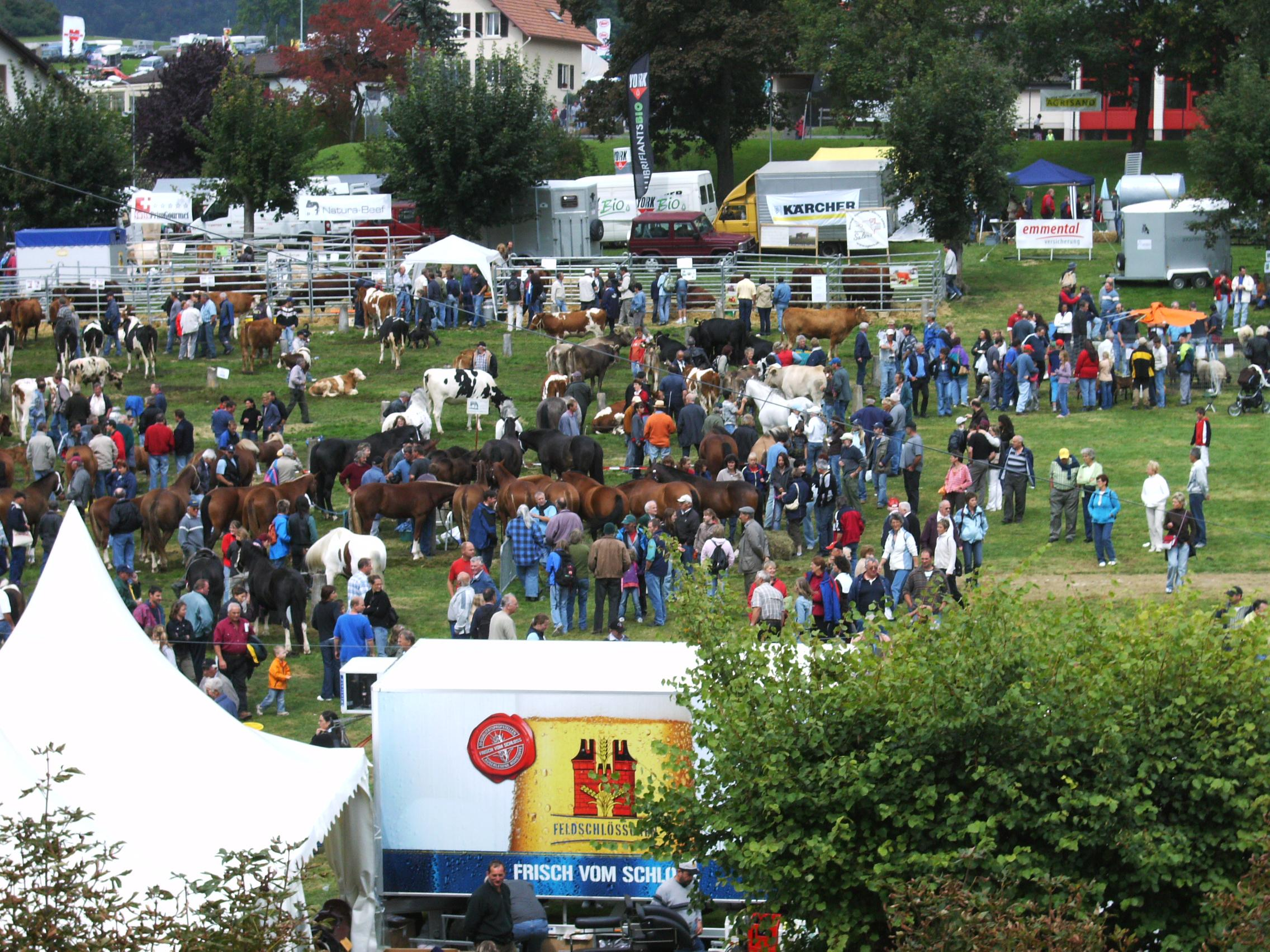
Foire de Chaindon 2007 (Chaindon fair)

Reconvilier has a population (as of December 2020) of 2,380. As of 2010, 16.1% of the population are resident foreign nationals. Over the last 10 years (2001-2011) the population has changed at a rate of -2.3%. Migration accounted for -2.7%, while births and deaths accounted for -0.2%.

Most of the population (as of 2000) speaks French (1,999 or 82.7%) as their first language, German is the second most common (166 or 6.9%) and Italian is the third (72 or 3.0%).

As of 2008, the population was 48.9% male and 51.1% female. The population was made up of 897 Swiss men (40.1% of the population) and 197 (8.8%) non-Swiss men. There were 980 Swiss women (43.8%) and 164 (7.3%) non-Swiss women. Of the population in the municipality, 682 or about 28.2% were born in Reconvilier and lived there in 2000. There were 744 or 30.8% who were born in the same canton, while 369 or 15.3% were born somewhere else in Switzerland, and 445 or 18.4% were born outside of Switzerland.

As of 2011, children and teenagers (0–19 years old) make up 21.6% of the population, while adults (20–64 years old) make up 58.7% and seniors (over 64 years old) make up 19.7%.

As of 2000, there were 933 people who were single and never married in the municipality. There were 1,146 married individuals, 197 widows or widowers and 141 individuals who are divorced.

As of 2010, there were 351 households that consist of only one person and 58 households with five or more people. In 2000, a total of 998 apartments (87.5% of the total) were permanently occupied, while 66 apartments (5.8%) were seasonally occupied and 77 apartments (6.7%) were empty. As of 2010, the construction rate of new housing units was 0.4 new units per 1000 residents. The vacancy rate for the municipality, in 2012, was 5.99%. In 2011, single family homes made up 63.5% of the total housing in the municipality.

The historical population is given in the following chart:

== Sights ==
The entire urbanized village of Reconvilier is designated as part of the Inventory of Swiss Heritage Sites

== Politics ==
In the 2011 federal election the most popular party was the Swiss People's Party (SVP) which received 32.7% of the vote. The next three most popular parties were the Social Democratic Party (SP) (24.3%), the FDP.The Liberals (8.1%) and the Evangelical People's Party (EVP) (7.6%). In the federal election, a total of 580 votes were cast, and the voter turnout was 39.5%.

== Economy ==
As of 2011, Reconvilier had an unemployment rate of 2.4%. As of 2008, there were a total of 814 people employed in the municipality. Of these, there were 25 people employed in the primary economic sector and about 9 businesses involved in this sector. 353 people were employed in the secondary sector and there were 28 businesses in this sector. 436 people were employed in the tertiary sector, with 54 businesses in this sector. There were 1,138 residents of the municipality who were employed in some capacity, of which females made up 43.1% of the workforce.

In 2008 there were a total of 683 full-time equivalent jobs. The number of jobs in the primary sector was 16, all of which were in agriculture. The number of jobs in the secondary sector was 333 of which 250 or (75.1%) were in manufacturing and 83 (24.9%) were in construction. The number of jobs in the tertiary sector was 334. In the tertiary sector; 145 or 43.4% were in wholesale or retail sales or the repair of motor vehicles, 13 or 3.9% were in the movement and storage of goods, 25 or 7.5% were in a hotel or restaurant, 4 or 1.2% were technical professionals or scientists, 29 or 8.7% were in education and 83 or 24.9% were in health care.

In 2000, there were 629 workers who commuted into the municipality and 573 workers who commuted away. The municipality is a net importer of workers, with about 1.1 workers entering the municipality for every one leaving. A total of 565 workers (48.0% of the 1,176 total workers in the municipality) both lived and worked in Reconvilier. About 2.9% of the workforce coming into Reconvilier are coming from outside Switzerland. Of the working population, 11% used public transportation to get to work, and 56.9% used a private car.

In 2011 the average local and cantonal tax rate on a married resident, with two children, of Reconvilier making 150,000 CHF was 13.3%, while an unmarried resident's rate was 19.5%. For comparison, the rate for the entire canton in the same year, was 14.2% and 22.0%, while the nationwide rate was 12.3% and 21.1% respectively. In 2009 there were a total of 980 tax payers in the municipality. Of that total, 280 made over 75,000 CHF per year. There were 16 people who made between 15,000 and 20,000 per year. The average income of the over 75,000 CHF group in Reconvilier was 106,218 CHF, while the average across all of Switzerland was 130,478 CHF.

In 2011 a total of 5.0% of the population received direct financial assistance from the government.

== Religion ==
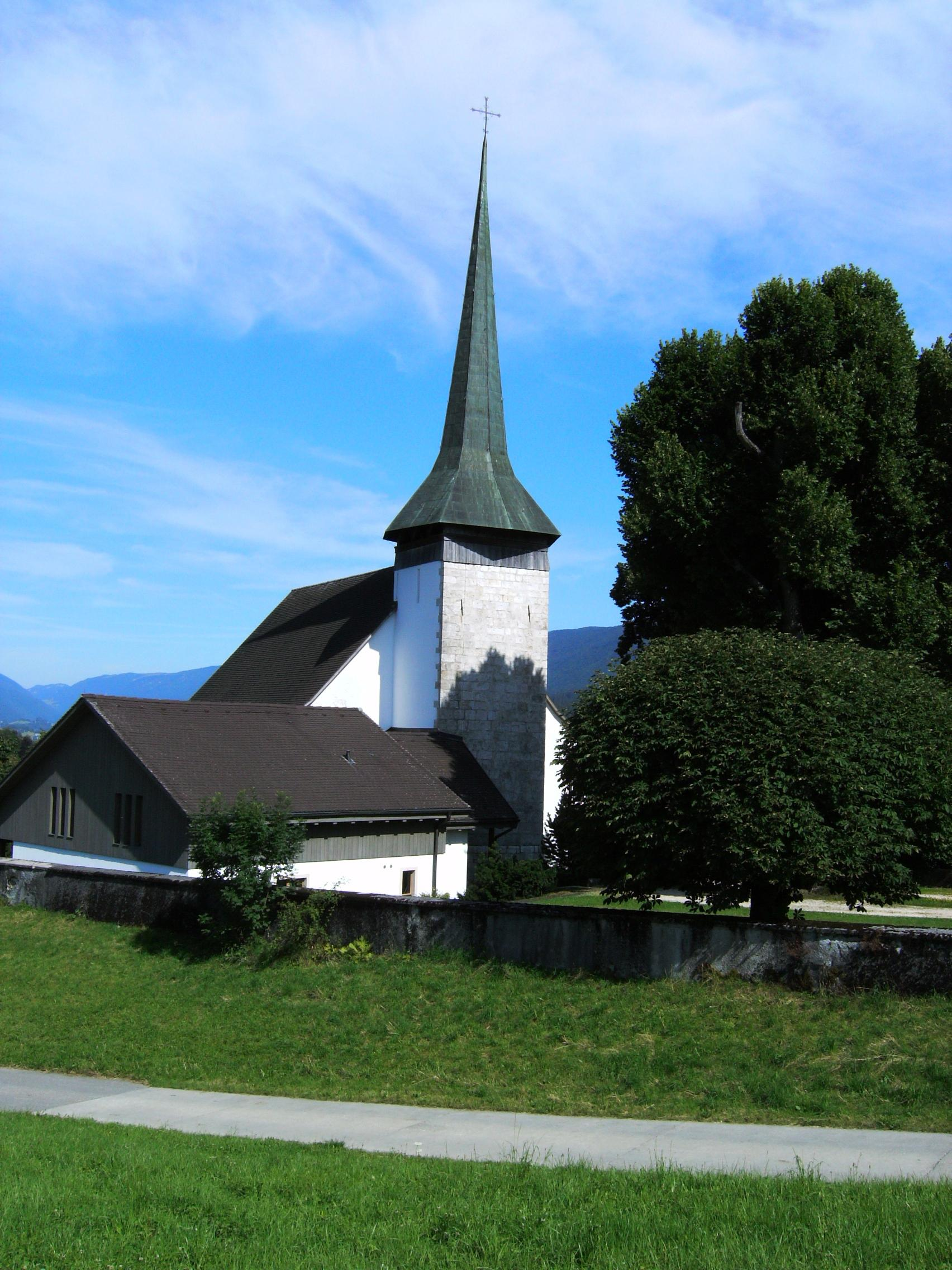
Chaindon church

From the 2000 census, 1,082 or 44.8% belonged to the Swiss Reformed Church, while 687 or 28.4% were Roman Catholic. Of the rest of the population, there were 12 members of an Orthodox church (or about 0.50% of the population), there were 4 individuals (or about 0.17% of the population) who belonged to the Christian Catholic Church, and there were 266 individuals (or about 11.01% of the population) who belonged to another Christian church. There were 63 (or about 2.61% of the population) who were Islamic. There were 5 individuals who were Buddhist, 3 individuals who were Hindu and 5 individuals who belonged to another church. 176 (or about 7.28% of the population) belonged to no church, are agnostic or atheist, and 114 individuals (or about 4.72% of the population) did not answer the question.

== Education ==
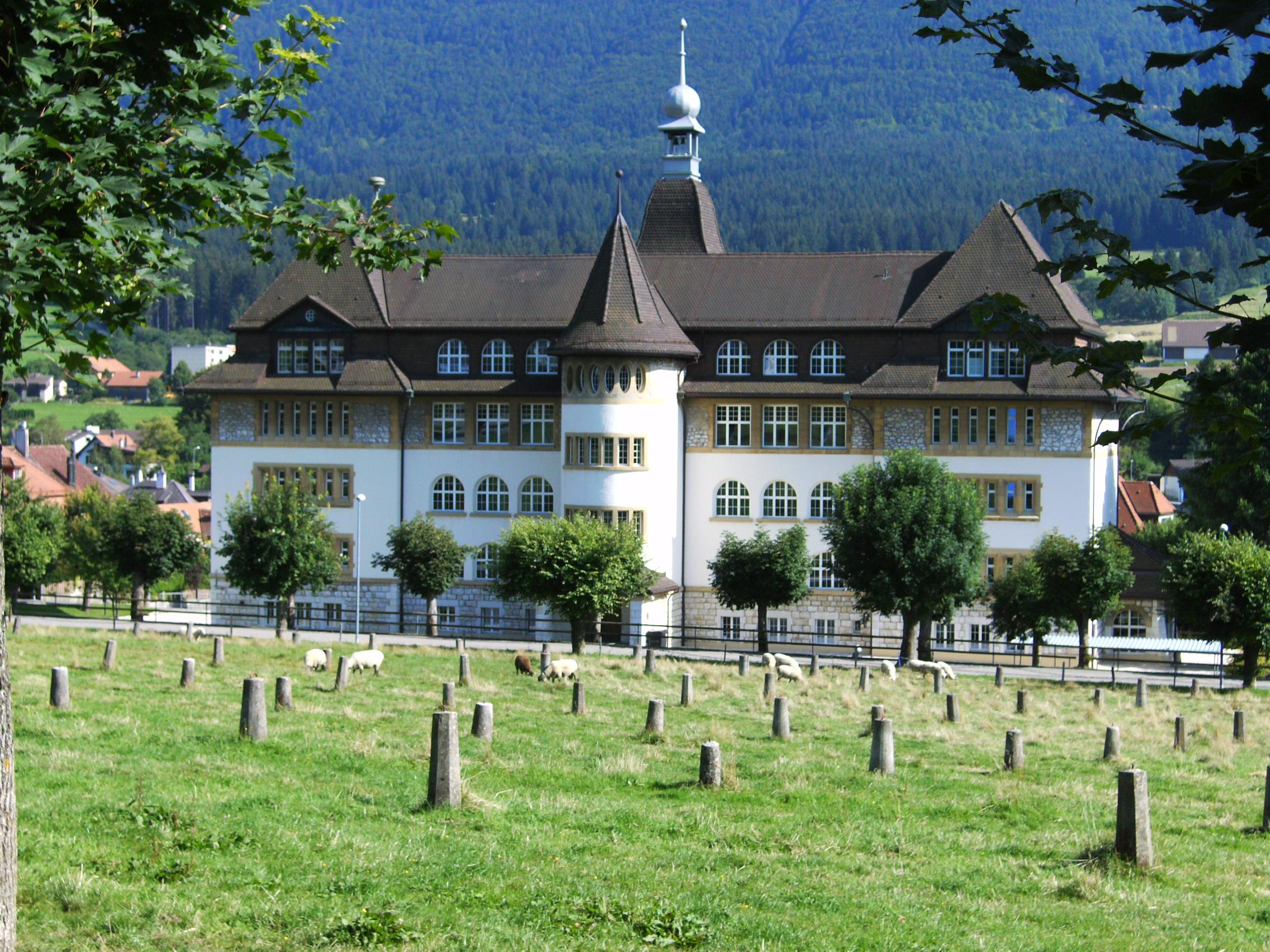
Reconvilier primary school

In Reconvilier about 49.2% of the population have completed non-mandatory upper secondary education, and 12.4% have completed additional higher education (either university or a Fachhochschule). Of the 187 who had completed some form of tertiary schooling listed in the census, 61.5% were Swiss men, 24.1% were Swiss women, 6.4% were non-Swiss men and 8.0% were non-Swiss women.

The Canton of Bern school system provides one year of non-obligatory Kindergarten, followed by six years of Primary school. This is followed by three years of obligatory lower Secondary school where the students are separated according to ability and aptitude. Following the lower Secondary students may attend additional schooling or they may enter an apprenticeship.

During the 2011-12 school year, there were a total of 266 students attending classes in Reconvilier. There were 3 kindergarten classes with a total of 40 students in the municipality. Of the kindergarten students, 5.0% were permanent or temporary residents of Switzerland (not citizens) and 27.5% have a different mother language than the classroom language. The municipality had 8 primary classes and 145 students. Of the primary students, 17.9% were permanent or temporary residents of Switzerland (not citizens) and 17.2% have a different mother language than the classroom language. During the same year, there were 5 lower secondary classes with a total of 81 students. There were 9.9% who were permanent or temporary residents of Switzerland (not citizens) and 9.9% have a different mother language than the classroom language.

As of 2000, there were a total of 308 students attending any school in the municipality. Of those, 274 both lived and attended school in the municipality, while 34 students came from another municipality. During the same year, 70 residents attended schools outside the municipality.

== Transportation ==
The municipality has a railway station, Reconvilier. It is located on the Sonceboz-Sombeval–Moutier line and has regular service to Biel/Bienne and Moutier.
