= Sonceboz-Sombeval =

- Municipality
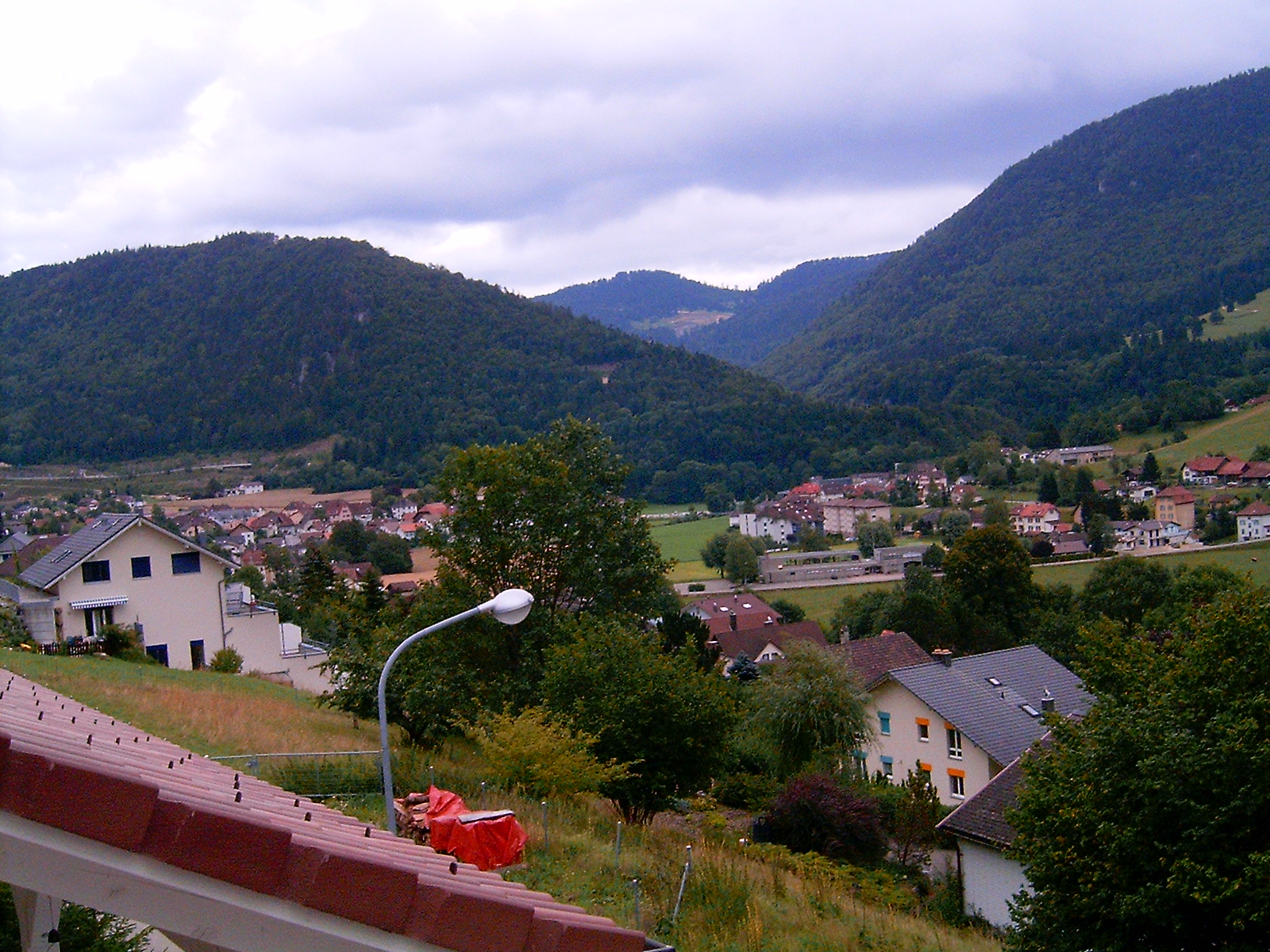
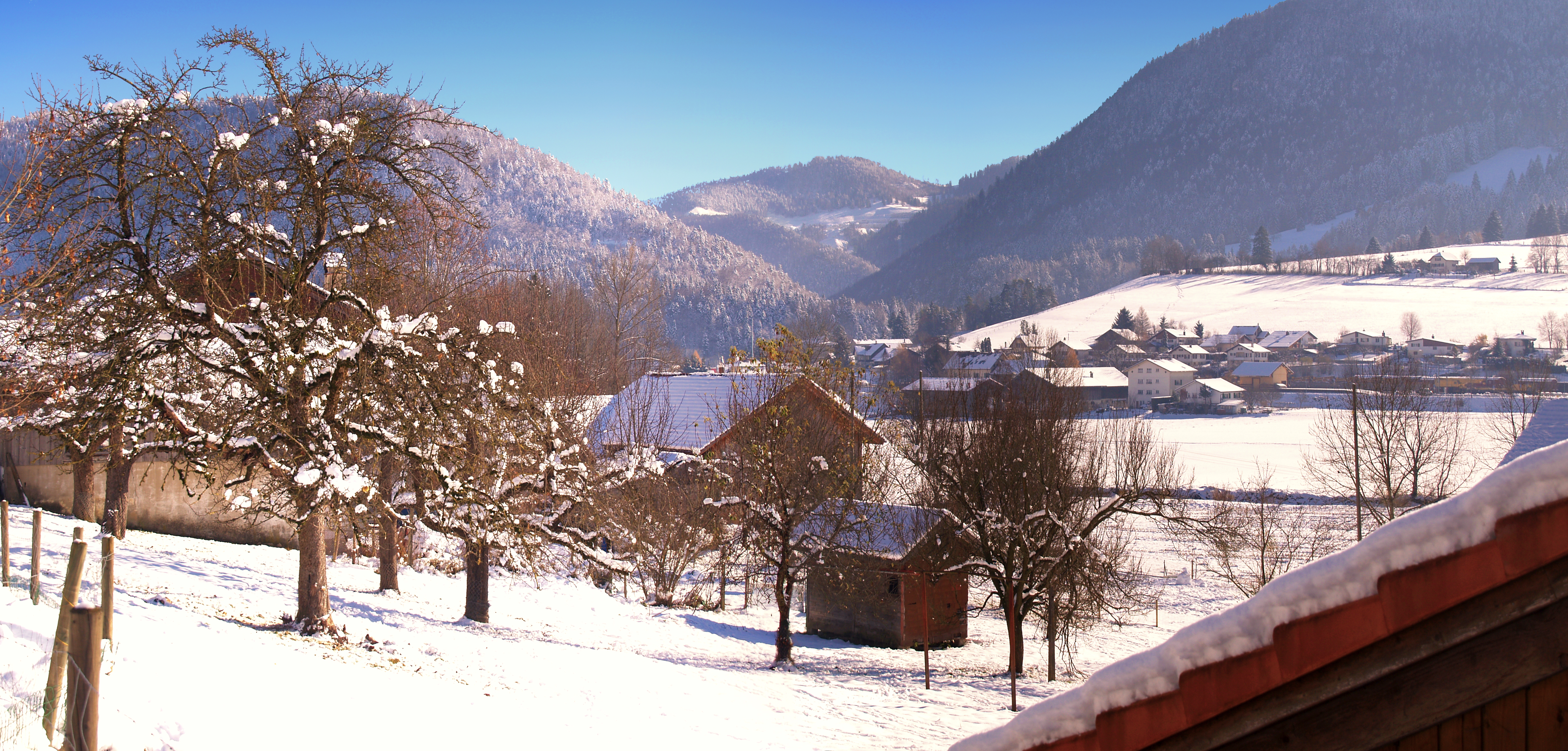
- Sonceboz-Sombeval village Sonceboz-Sombeval village

- Flag Coat of arms
- Location of Sonceboz-Sombeval
- Location within Switzerland Location within Canton of Bern
- Coordinates: 47°12′N 7°11′E
- Country: Switzerland
- Canton: Bern
- District: Jura bernois

Government
  - Executive: Conseil municipal with 7 members
  - Mayor: Maire; Claude-Alain Wüthrich SVP/UDC (as of 2026)

Area
  - Total: 15.03 km^{2} (5.80 sq mi)
- Elevation: 653 m (2,142 ft)

Population (December 2020)
  - Total: 1,954
  - Density: 130.0/km^{2} (336.7/sq mi)
- Time zone: UTC+01:00 (CET)
  - Summer (DST): UTC+02:00 (CEST)
- Postal code: 2605
- SFOS number: 444
- ISO 3166 code: CH-BE
- Surrounded by: Corgémont, Orvin, La Heutte, Tavannes
- Website: www.sonceboz.ch

Sonceboz-Sombeval is a municipality in the Jura bernois administrative district in the canton of Bern in Switzerland. It is located in the French-speaking Bernese Jura (Jura Bernois).

== History ==
Sonceboz-Sombeval is first mentioned in 866 as Summavallis. In 1179 it was mentioned as Sommeval and in 1303 it was Suntzelbo.

Its location at the foot of the historic Pierre Pertuis pass (in operation since the Roman era) made the villages an important stopping point and transportation hub. The Petinesca Roman road ran to the east of Sonceboz before it crossed the Jura Mountains. The ruins of a 4th-century Roman settlement have been discovered at the Le Châtillon ridge. After the collapse of the Roman Empire, a medieval settlement developed over the Roman settlement. In 999 Moutier-Grandval Abbey gave the local farms and the Summavallis chapel to the Prince-Bishop of Basel. The Prince-Bishop assigned Moutier-Grandval Abbey to administer the village as the bailiff and the parish priest (placing the Abbey over the secular and spiritual needs of the village). This organization continued until Sonceboz and Sombeval accepted the Protestant Reformation in 1530. After the Reformation, the villages were under the secular administration of Erguel. After the 1797 French victory and the Treaty of Campo Formio, Sonceboz-Sombeval became part of the French Département of Mont-Terrible. Three years later, in 1800 it became part of the Département of Haut-Rhin. After Napoleon's defeat and the Congress of Vienna, Sonceboz-Sombeval was assigned to the Canton of Bern in 1815.

The Chapel of St. Agatha in Sombeval became the parish church for the Sombeval parish in the 13th century. It was rebuilt in 1737 and again in 1866. Decades after the villagers accepted the new Reformed faith, in 1590 they became part of the Corgémont parish. They remained part of that parish until 1931.

Throughout the Early Modern period Sonceboz remained a small hamlet with only a few houses dependent on the larger village of Sombeval. However, in the early 18th century Sonceboz became an important staging post for trade over the pass. Beginning in 1849 the growth of the watch parts industry brought workers to the villages and forcing them to expand. In 1874 the Biel-Les Convers and Sonceboz-Tavannes railway lines opened and forever changed the character of the village. While Sombeval retained much of its rural character, the population and industry in Sonceboz exploded. With the population growing the two formerly independent villages merged as they physically grew together. In 1936 the watch parts manufacturer Société industrielle de Sonceboz built a factory in the village. In 1978, the flooring manufacturer Bienna SA built a factory in the municipality, which strengthened the industrial sector. By 2005, over two-thirds of the jobs in the municipality are manufacturing.

== Geography ==
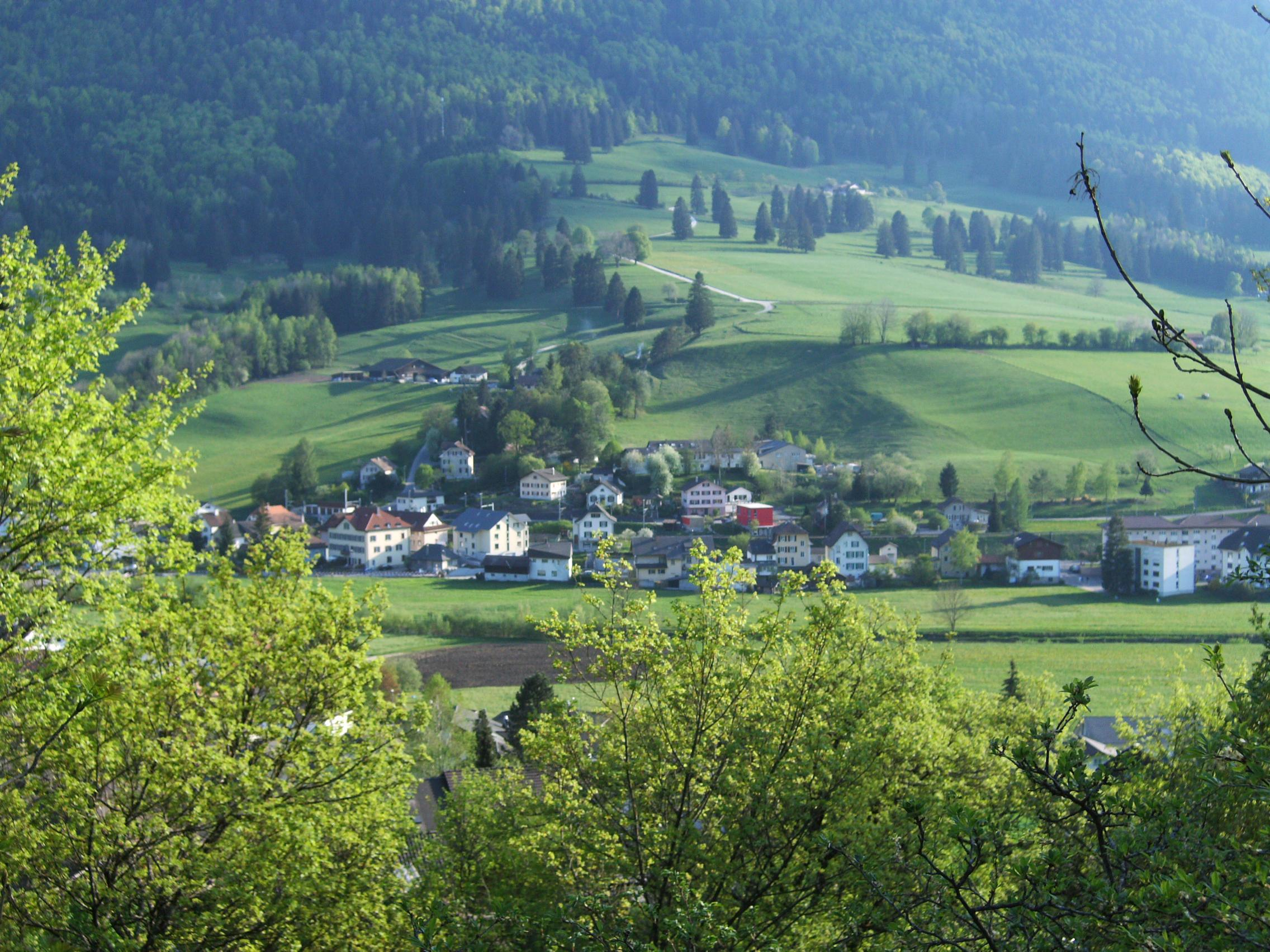
Sonceboz-Sombeval

Aerial view (1950)

Sonceboz-Sombeval has an area of 14.96 km^{2} (5.78 sq mi). Of this area, 5 km^{2} (1.9 mi^{2}) or 33.3% is used for agricultural purposes, while 8.76 km^{2} (3.38 mi^{2}) or 58.4% is forested. Of the rest of the land, 1.12 km^{2} (0.43 mi^{2}) or 7.5% is settled (buildings or roads), 0.07 km^{2} (17 acres) or 0.5% is either rivers or lakes and 0.04 km^{2} (9.9 acres) or 0.3% is unproductive land.

Of the built up area, housing and buildings made up 2.9% and transportation infrastructure made up 3.7%. Out of the forested land, 55.8% of the total land area is heavily forested and 2.6% is covered with orchards or small clusters of trees. Of the agricultural land, 7.5% is used for growing crops and 14.4% is pastures and 11.3% is used for alpine pastures. All the water in the municipality is flowing water.

The municipality is located in the Saint-Imier valley at the foot of the historic Pierre Pertuis pass. It consists of the villages of Sonceboz and Sombeval which have grown together.

On 31 December 2009 District de Courtelary, the municipality's former district, was dissolved. On the following day, 1 January 2010, it joined the newly created Arrondissement administratif Jura bernois.

== Coat of arms ==
The blazon of the municipal coat of arms is Argent three Fir Trees Vert trunked Gules issuant from a Mount of 3 Coupeaux of the second and in chief two Mullets of Five of the third.

== Demographics ==
Sonceboz-Sombeval has a population (as of December 2020) of 1,954. As of 2010, 15.3% of the population are resident foreign nationals. Over the last 10 years (2000-2010) the population has changed at a rate of 5.4%. Migration accounted for 0.7%, while births and deaths accounted for 3.6%.

Most of the population (as of 2000) speaks French (1,358 or 81.5%) as their first language, German is the second most common (202 or 12.1%) and Italian is the third (53 or 3.2%). There is 1 person who speaks Romansh.

As of 2008, the population was 50.6% male and 49.4% female. The population was made up of 746 Swiss men (41.9% of the population) and 155 (8.7%) non-Swiss men. There were 761 Swiss women (42.8%) and 117 (6.6%) non-Swiss women. Of the population in the municipality, 511 or about 30.7% were born in Sonceboz-Sombeval and lived there in 2000. There were 586 or 35.2% who were born in the same canton, while 274 or 16.4% were born somewhere else in Switzerland, and 240 or 14.4% were born outside of Switzerland.

As of 2010, children and teenagers (0–19 years old) make up 25.3% of the population, while adults (20–64 years old) make up 59.1% and seniors (over 64 years old) make up 15.6%.

As of 2000, there were 652 people who were single and never married in the municipality. There were 847 married individuals, 83 widows or widowers and 84 individuals who are divorced.

As of 2000, there were 162 households that consist of only one person and 52 households with five or more people. In 2000, a total of 625 apartments (87.0% of the total) were permanently occupied, while 58 apartments (8.1%) were seasonally occupied and 35 apartments (4.9%) were empty. As of 2010, the construction rate of new housing units was 2.8 new units per 1000 residents. The vacancy rate for the municipality, in 2011, was 1.53%.

The historical population is given in the following chart:

== Politics ==
In the 2011 federal election the most popular party was the Swiss People's Party (SVP) which received 30.5% of the vote. The next two most popular parties were the Social Democratic Party (SP) (19.9%), and the Green Party (9.5%) . In the federal election, a total of 380 votes were cast, and the voter turnout was 32.4%.

== Economy ==
As of 2011, Sonceboz-Sombeval had an unemployment rate of 2.38%. As of 2008, there were a total of 1,838 people employed in the municipality. Of these, there were 36 people employed in the primary economic sector and about 12 businesses involved in this sector. 1,331 people were employed in the secondary sector and there were 27 businesses in this sector. 471 people were employed in the tertiary sector, with 48 businesses in this sector. There were 415 residents of the municipality who were employed in some capacity, of which females made up 74.0% of the workforce.

In 2008 there were a total of 1,755 full-time equivalent jobs. The number of jobs in the primary sector was 30, all in agriculture. The number of jobs in the secondary sector was 1,306 of which 1,269 or (97.2%) were in manufacturing and 34 (2.6%) were in construction. The number of jobs in the tertiary sector was 419. In the tertiary sector; 202 or 48.2% were in wholesale or retail sales or the repair of motor vehicles, 32 or 7.6% were in a hotel or restaurant, 102 or 24.3% were in the information industry, 17 or 4.1% were in education and 18 or 4.3% were in health care.

In 2000, there were 1,329 workers who commuted into the municipality and 559 workers who commuted away. The municipality is a net importer of workers, with about 2.4 workers entering the municipality for every one leaving. About 31.2% of the workforce coming into Sonceboz-Sombeval are coming from outside Switzerland. Of the working population, 14.2% used public transportation to get to work, and 61.5% used a private car.

== Religion ==
According to the 2000 census, 547 or 32.8% were Roman Catholic, while 677 or 40.6% belonged to the Swiss Reformed Church. Of the rest of the population, there were 4 members of an Orthodox church (or about 0.24% of the population), there were 7 individuals (or about 0.42% of the population) who belonged to the Christian Catholic Church, and there were 342 individuals (or about 20.53% of the population) who belonged to another Christian church. There was 1 individual who was Jewish, and 16 (or about 0.96% of the population) who were Islamic. There were 2 individuals who belonged to another church. 172 (or about 10.32% of the population) belonged to no church, are agnostic or atheist, and 68 individuals (or about 4.08% of the population) did not answer the question.

== Education ==
In Sonceboz-Sombeval about 650 or (39.0%) of the population have completed non-mandatory upper secondary education, and 135 or (8.1%) have completed additional higher education (either university or a Fachhochschule). Of the 135 who completed tertiary schooling, 68.1% were Swiss men, 17.8% were Swiss women, 9.6% were non-Swiss men and 4.4% were non-Swiss women.

The Canton of Bern school system provides one year of non-obligatory Kindergarten, followed by six years of Primary school. This is followed by three years of obligatory lower Secondary school where the students are separated according to ability and aptitude. Following the lower Secondary students may attend additional schooling or they may enter an apprenticeship.

During the 2010-11 school year, there were a total of 170 students attending classes in Sonceboz-Sombeval. There were 2 kindergarten classes with a total of 43 students in the municipality. Of the kindergarten students, 11.6% were permanent or temporary residents of Switzerland (not citizens) and 7.0% have a different mother language than the classroom language. The municipality had 8 primary classes and 127 students. Of the primary students, 17.3% were permanent or temporary residents of Switzerland (not citizens) and 14.2% have a different mother language than the classroom language.

As of 2000, there were 58 students in Sonceboz-Sombeval who came from another municipality, while 121 residents attended schools outside the municipality.

== Transportation ==
The municipality has a railway station, Sonceboz-Sombeval. The station is located at the junction of the Biel/Bienne–La Chaux-de-Fonds and Sonceboz-Sombeval–Moutier lines and has hourly service to Biel/Bienne, Moutier, and La Chaux-de-Fonds.

== Personalities ==
- Le Bel Hubert (Hubert Bourquin), singer
