= La Heutte =

- Former municipality
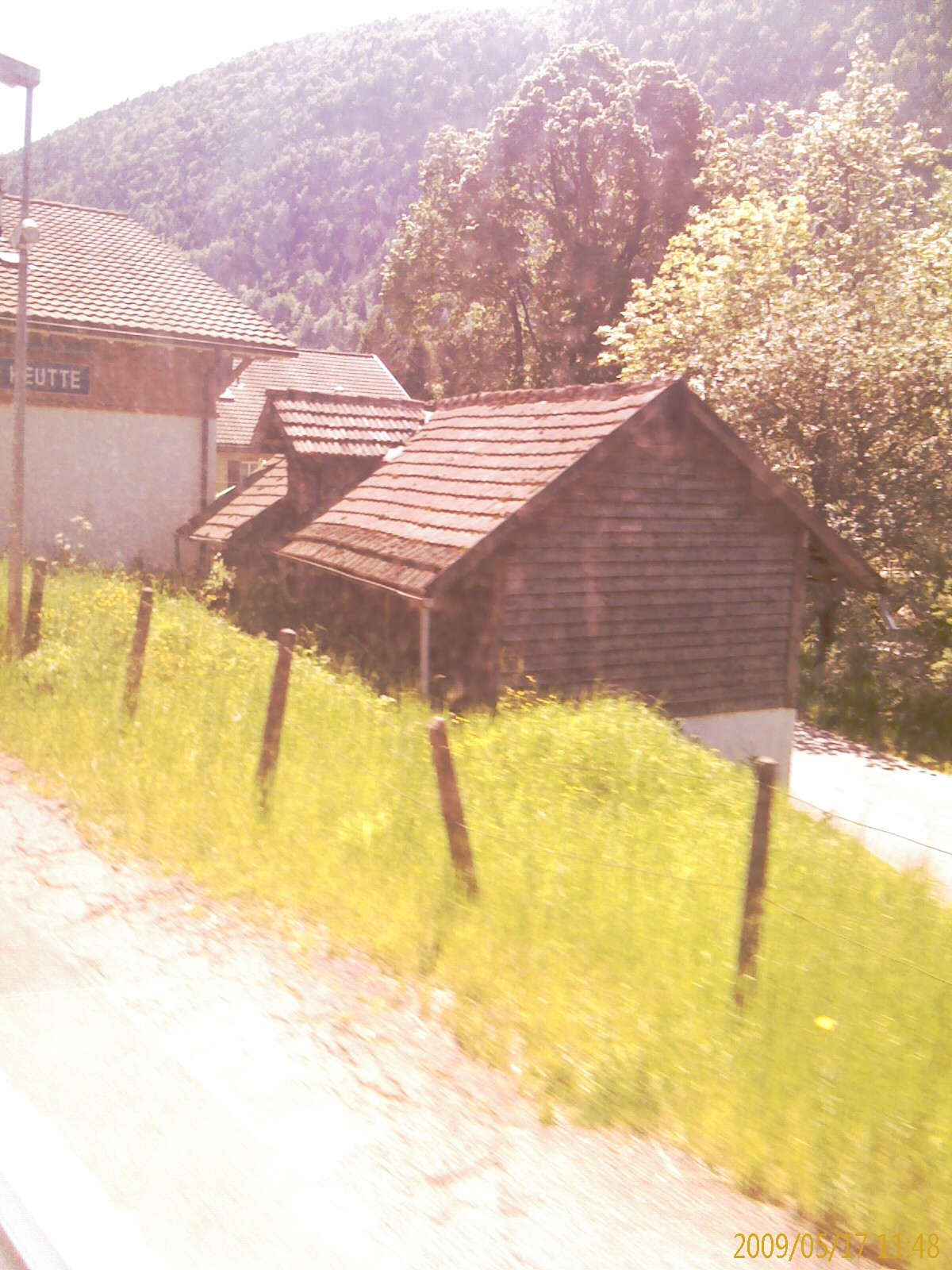
- La Heutte village train station

- Flag Coat of arms
- Location of La Heutte
- Location within Switzerland Location within Canton of Bern
- Coordinates: 47°11′N 7°13′E
- Country: Switzerland
- Canton: Bern
- District: Jura bernois

Government
  - Mayor: Maire

Area
  - Total: 8.0 km^{2} (3.1 sq mi)
- Elevation: 615 m (2,018 ft)

Population (Dec 2013)
  - Total: 485
  - Density: 61/km^{2} (160/sq mi)
- Time zone: UTC+01:00 (CET)
  - Summer (DST): UTC+02:00 (CEST)
- Postal code: 2604
- SFOS number: 436
- ISO 3166 code: CH-BE
- Surrounded by: Sonceboz-Sombeval, Orvin, Péry, Reconvilier, Tavannes
- Website: pery-laheutte.ch

La Heutte is a former municipality in the Jura bernois administrative district in the canton of Bern in Switzerland. It is located in the French-speaking Bernese Jura (Jura Bernois). On 1 January 2015 the former municipalities of Péry and La Heutte merged to form the new municipality of Péry-La Heutte.

== History ==
La Heutte was first mentioned in 1393 as Hütte. It was first called by the current name in 1727.

A glass-hut or glassworks was mentioned in the area as part of a fief of the d'Orsans family in 1370. While a village was not mentioned then, by 1393 a village had grown around the glassworks. It was part of the seigniory of Erguel in the Diocese of Basel. It was part of the parish of Péry. So La Heutte adopted the Protestant Reformation in 1530, when Biel converted the entire parish of Péry to the new faith. During the 18th century, Biel attempted to expand its power, which caused frequent conflicts with the neighboring villages, including La Heutte.

The first glass factory, at Le Van north of the village, dates from before 1370. Another glass factory opened in the valley at the end of the 15th century and remained in operation until the early 17th century. Between 1650 and 1750 the village expanded toward the Suze river as the population grew. A thriving pottery industry and a large mill developed along the river. The first school was built in the 1839. In 1876 a train station was built in the village, which encouraged the growth of the watch industry. Two years later, the Ammann watch factory opened in the old Bendit mill. In 1895 the Urania Watch Company replaced Ammann in the mill. It was, in turn, replaced by the Weber wire drawing factory in 1938. During a watchmaking boom between 1950 and 1974, numerous small watch and watch part workshops opened in the village. The A16 motorway connected La Heutte with Biel in 1985, transforming the village into a bedroom community.

In 1995 about a dozen tracks of three-toed dinosaurs were discovered in the municipality.

== Geography ==
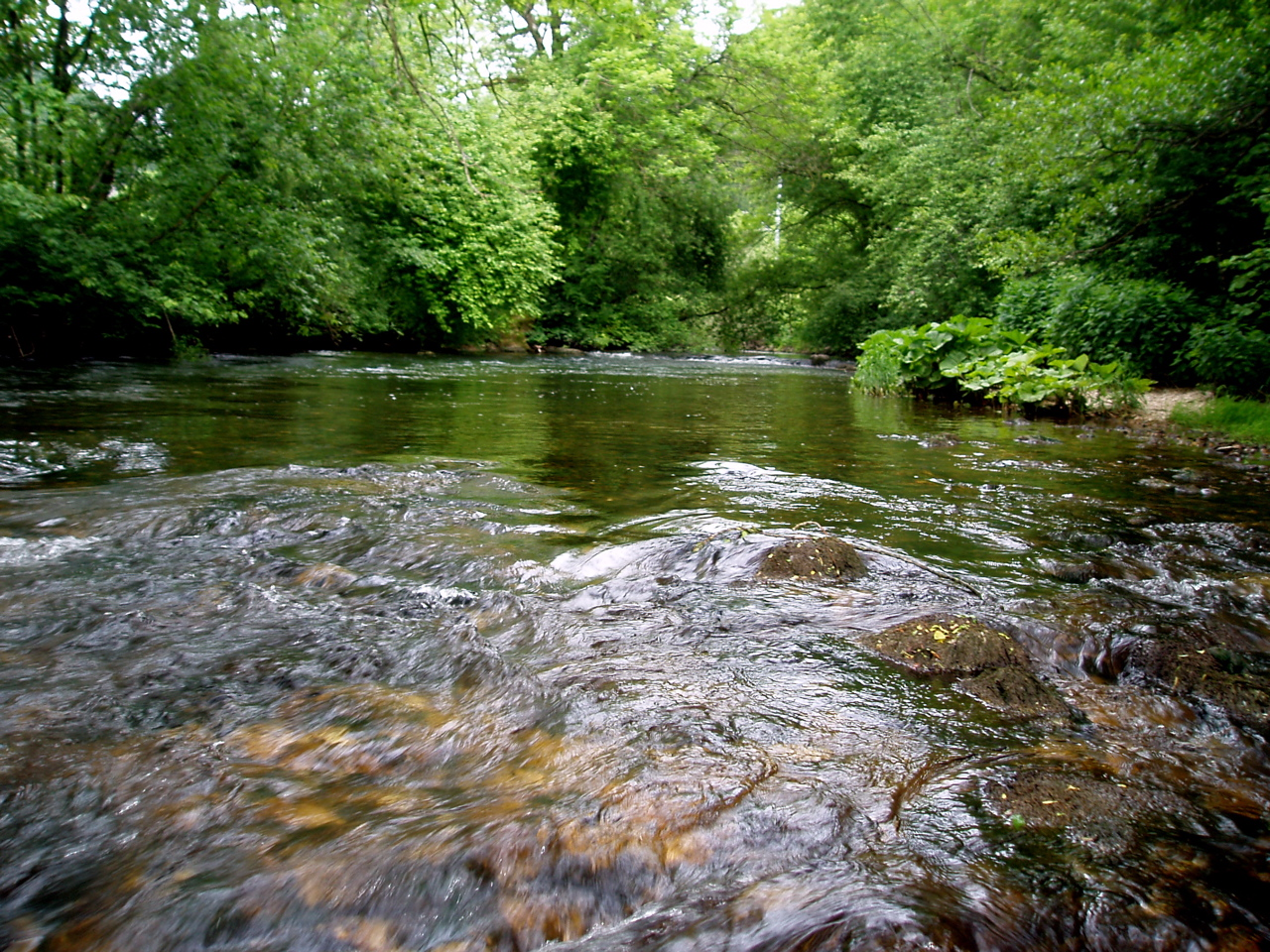
Suze river at La Heutte

La Heutte is located in the lower part of Vallon de Saint-Imier, 6 kilometers (3.7 mi) from the town of Biel/Bienne. It is located in the narrow Suze valley that lies on the old Roman road between Augusta Raurica (Augst) und Petinesca (Studen).

Before the merger, La Heutte had a total area of 8.1 km^{2} (3.1 mi^{2}). Of this area, 2 km^{2} (0.77 mi^{2}) or 24.8% is used for agricultural purposes, while 5.24 km^{2} (2.02 mi^{2}) or 64.9% is forested. Of the rest of the land, 0.74 km^{2} (0.29 mi^{2}) or 9.2% is settled (buildings or roads), 0.03 km^{2} (7.4 acres) or 0.4% is either rivers or lakes and 0.05 km^{2} (12 acres) or 0.6% is unproductive land.

Of the built up area, housing and buildings made up 1.9% and transportation infrastructure made up 4.0%. Power and water infrastructure as well as other special developed areas made up 2.8% of the area Out of the forested land, 62.7% of the total land area is heavily forested and 2.1% is covered with orchards or small clusters of trees. Of the agricultural land, 5.9% is used for growing crops and 9.5% is pastures and 9.0% is used for alpine pastures. All the water in the municipality is flowing water.

On 31 December 2009 District de Courtelary, the municipality's former district, was dissolved. On the following day, 1 January 2010, it joined the newly created Arrondissement administratif Jura bernois.

== Coat of arms ==
The blazon of the municipal coat of arms is Gules on a Base Sable a Glassworks Argent roofed of the second.

== Demographics ==
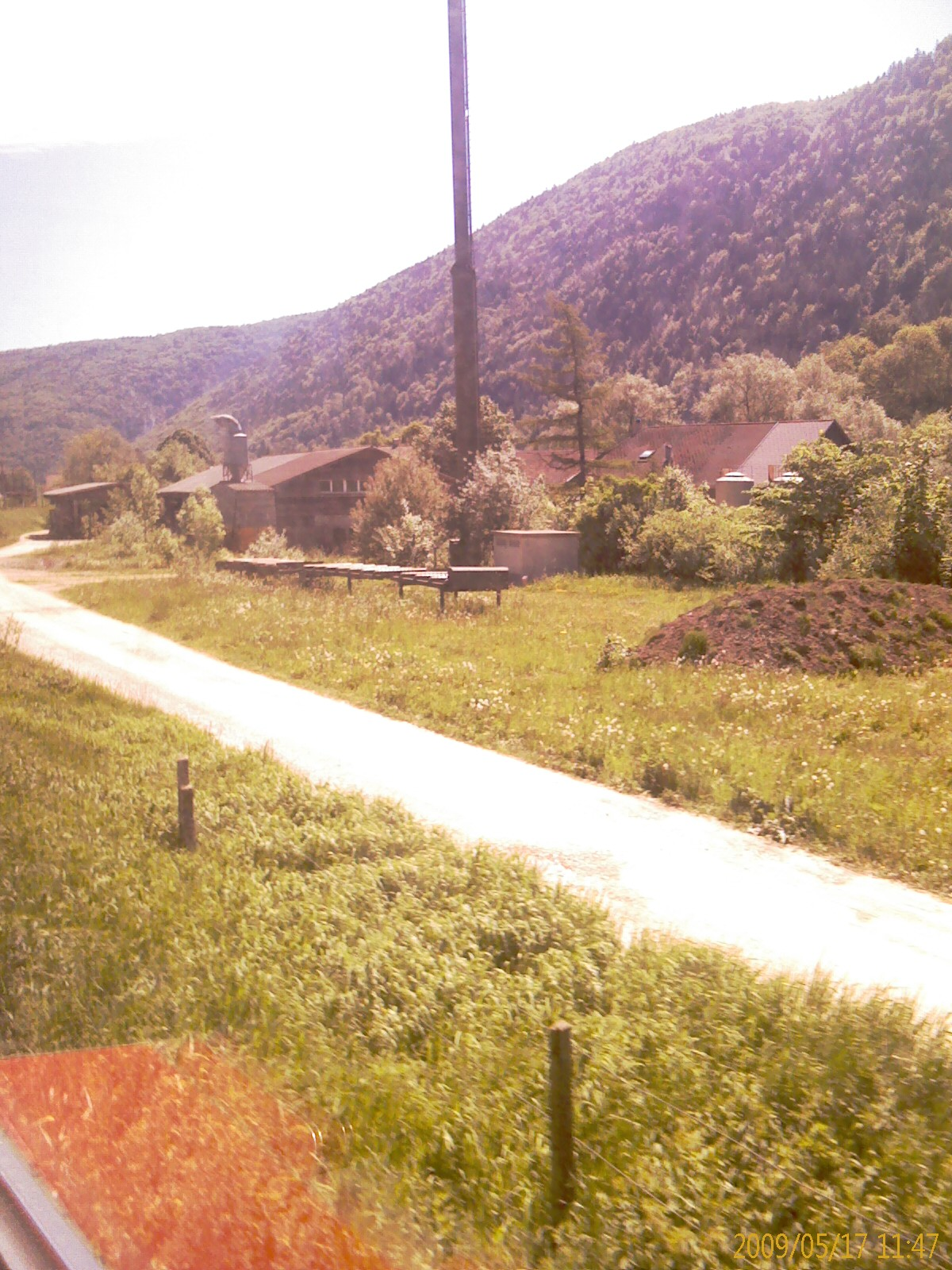
La Heutte village

La Heutte had a population (as of 2013) of 485. As of 2010, 11.6% of the population are resident foreign nationals. Over the last 10 years (2000-2010) the population has changed at a rate of -1.6%. Migration accounted for -5.1%, while births and deaths accounted for 4.1%.

Most of the population (as of 2000) speaks French (367 or 75.2%) as their first language, German is the second most common (98 or 20.1%) and Spanish is the third (14 or 2.9%). There are 8 people who speak Italian.

As of 2008, the population was 52.6% male and 47.4% female. The population was made up of 226 Swiss men (46.8% of the population) and 28 (5.8%) non-Swiss men. There were 201 Swiss women (41.6%) and 28 (5.8%) non-Swiss women. Of the population in the municipality, 131 or about 26.8% were born in La Heutte and lived there in 2000. There were 207 or 42.4% who were born in the same canton, while 74 or 15.2% were born somewhere else in Switzerland, and 63 or 12.9% were born outside of Switzerland.

As of 2010, children and teenagers (0–19 years old) make up 24% of the population, while adults (20–64 years old) make up 57.8% and seniors (over 64 years old) make up 18.2%.

As of 2000, there were 171 people who were single and never married in the municipality. There were 261 married individuals, 30 widows or widowers and 26 individuals who are divorced.

As of 2000, there were 36 households that consist of only one person and 11 households with five or more people. In 2000, a total of 194 apartments (86.2% of the total) were permanently occupied, while 20 apartments (8.9%) were seasonally occupied and 11 apartments (4.9%) were empty. The vacancy rate for the municipality, in 2011, was 0.39%.

The historical population is given in the following chart:

== Heritage sites of national significance ==
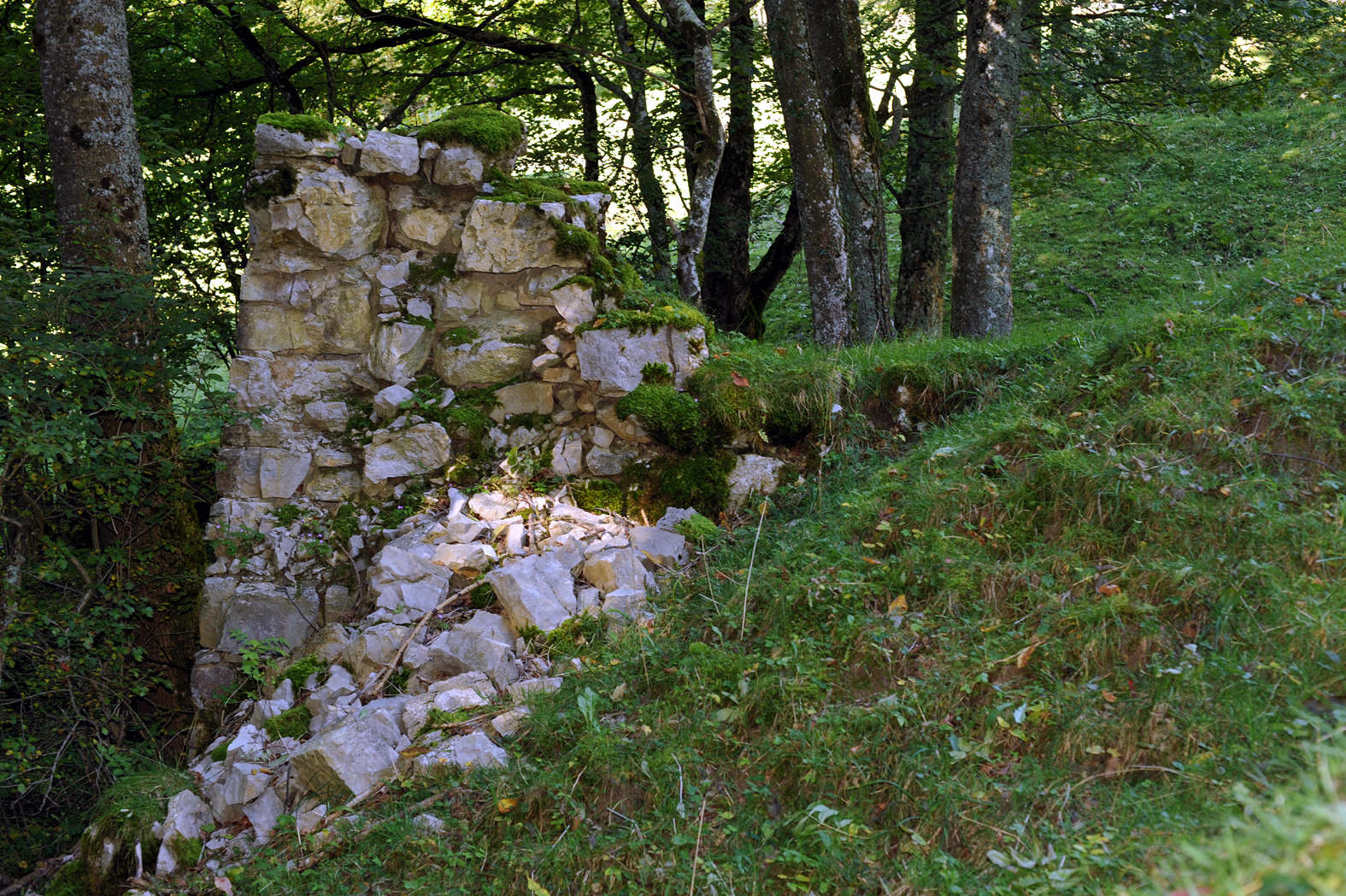
Ruins of the Le Van medieval glass factory

The Le Van, a medieval glass factory, is listed as a Swiss heritage site of national significance.

== Politics ==
In the 2011 federal election the most popular party was the Swiss People's Party (SVP) which received 32.7% of the vote. The next three most popular parties were the Social Democratic Party (SP) (28.5%), the Conservative Democratic Party (BDP) (9.3%) and the Conservative Democratic Party (BDP) (9.3%). In the federal election, a total of 127 votes were cast, and the voter turnout was 36.6%.

== Economy ==
As of 2011, La Heutte had an unemployment rate of 1.74%. As of 2008, there were a total of 72 people employed in the municipality. Of these, there were 10 people employed in the primary economic sector and about 4 businesses involved in this sector. 11 people were employed in the secondary sector and there were 3 businesses in this sector. 51 people were employed in the tertiary sector, with 9 businesses in this sector.

In 2008 there were a total of 56 full-time equivalent jobs. The number of jobs in the primary sector was 7, all in agriculture. The number of jobs in the secondary sector was 11, all in manufacturing. The number of jobs in the tertiary sector was 38. In the tertiary sector; 5 or 13.2% were in a hotel or restaurant, 10 or 26.3% were in education and 10 or 26.3% were in health care.

In 2000, there were 28 workers who commuted into the municipality and 224 workers who commuted away. The municipality is a net exporter of workers, with about 8.0 workers leaving the municipality for every one entering. Of the working population, 20.1% used public transportation to get to work, and 65.1% used a private car.

== Religion ==
From the 2000 census, 127 or 26.0% were Roman Catholic, while 282 or 57.8% belonged to the Swiss Reformed Church. Of the rest of the population, there were 28 individuals (or about 5.74% of the population) who belonged to another Christian church. There was 1 individual who was Islamic. There were 1 individual who belonged to another church. 45 (or about 9.22% of the population) belonged to no church, are agnostic or atheist, and 16 individuals (or about 3.28% of the population) did not answer the question.

== Education ==
In La Heutte about 204 or (41.8%) of the population have completed non-mandatory upper secondary education, and 34 or (7.0%) have completed additional higher education (either university or a Fachhochschule). Of the 34 who completed tertiary schooling, 55.9% were Swiss men, 23.5% were Swiss women, 14.7% were non-Swiss men.

The Canton of Bern school system provides one year of non-obligatory Kindergarten, followed by six years of Primary school. This is followed by three years of obligatory lower Secondary school where the students are separated according to ability and aptitude. Following the lower Secondary students may attend additional schooling or they may enter an apprenticeship.

During the 2010–11 school year, there were a total of 50 students attending classes in La Heutte. There was one kindergarten class with a total of 14 students in the municipality. Of the kindergarten students, 14.3% were permanent or temporary residents of Switzerland (not citizens) and 21.4% have a different mother language than the classroom language. The municipality had 2 primary classes and 36 students. Of the primary students, 16.7% were permanent or temporary residents of Switzerland (not citizens) and 27.8% have a different mother language than the classroom language.

As of 2000, there were 21 students from La Heutte who attended schools outside the municipality.
