= Col de Pierre Pertuis =

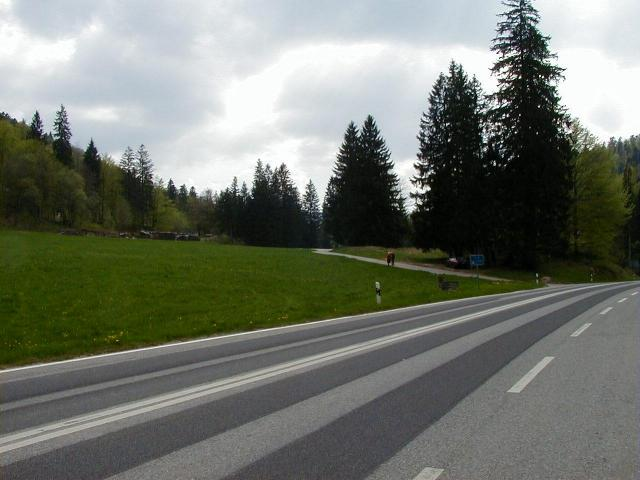
- Col de Pierre Pertuis
- Interactive map of Col de Pierre Pertuis
- Elevation: 827 m (2,713 ft)

Third Approach
- Location: Switzerland
- Range: Jura Mountains
- Coordinates: 47°12′36.37″N 7°11′39″E

Col de Pierre Pertuis (el. 827 m.) is a mountain pass in the Jura Mountains in the canton of Berne in Switzerland.

It connects Sonceboz and Tavannes.

The name of the pass comes from the Latin: Petra pertusa, meaning broken rock. A third century inscription concerning the construction of a road through a natural cutting in the rocks along the route of the pass demonstrates that this is part of a route that was used in the Roman period, connecting Aventicum (modern Avenches) with Augusta Raurica, a Roman settlement a short distance to the east of Basel.

The first road that was passable for automobiles was built during World War I by the corps of engineers of the Swiss Army. In 1932, a new road was built employing the jobless due to the Great Depression. In November 1997, a 2100-meter-long tunnel was opened for the A-16 Autobahn.
