= Sonceboz-Sombeval railway station =

Railway station in Sonceboz-Sombeval, Switzerland

Sonceboz-Sombeval
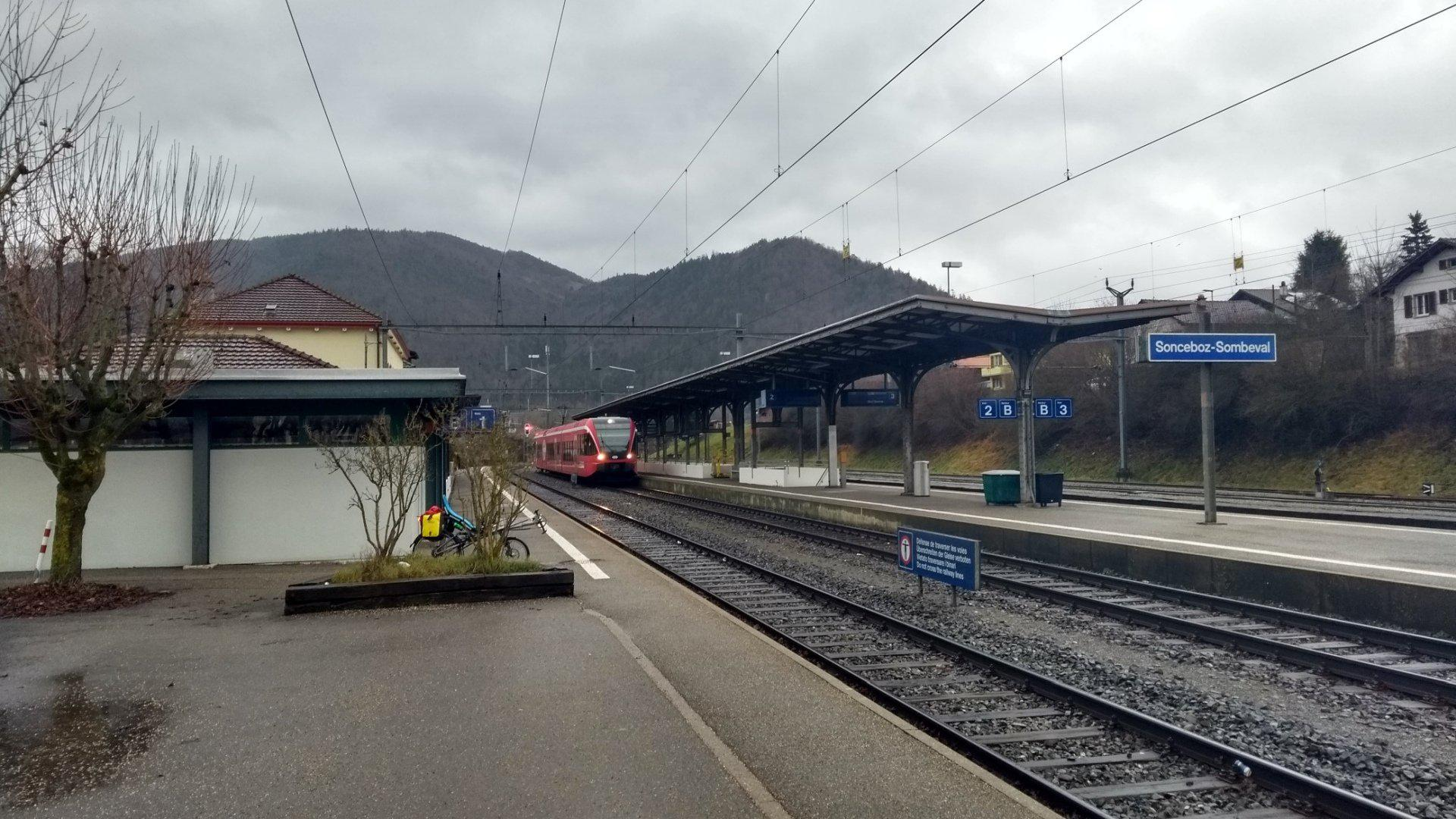
- The station in 2018

General information
- Location: Sonceboz-Sombeval; Switzerland
- Coordinates: 47°11′42″N 7°10′08″E
- Elevation: 653 m (2,142 ft)
- Owner: Swiss Federal Railways
- Lines: Biel/Bienne–La Chaux-de-Fonds line; Sonceboz-Sombeval–Moutier line
- Distance: 48.3 km (30.0 mi) from Bern
- Platforms: 3: 1 side platform; 1 island platform
- Tracks: 6
- Train operators: Swiss Federal Railways

Construction
- Parking: Yes (34 spaces)
- Cycle facilities: Yes (13 spaces)
- Accessible: Yes

Other information
- Station code: 8504304 (SCB)
- Fare zone: 321 (Libero)

Passengers
- 2023: 3'100 per weekday (SBB)

Services
| Preceding station | SBB CFF FFS | Following station |
|---|---|---|
| Courtelary towards La Chaux-de-Fonds | RE4 | Biel/Bienne Terminus |
| through to R42 | R41 | La Heutte towards Biel/Bienne |
| Corgémont towards La Chaux-de-Fonds | R41 | La Heutte towards Biel/Bienne |
| Tavannes towards Malleray-Bévilard or Moutier | R42 | through to R41 |
| Tavannes towards Moutier | R42 | Terminus |
Location

Sonceboz-Sombeval railway station (French: Gare de Sonceboz-Sombeval) is a railway station in the municipality of Sonceboz-Sombeval, in the Swiss canton of Bern. It is located at the junction of the standard gauge Biel/Bienne–La Chaux-de-Fonds and Sonceboz-Sombeval–Moutier lines of Swiss Federal Railways.

== Services ==
As of the December 2024 timetable change, the following services stop at Sonceboz-Sombeval:

- RegioExpress: hourly service between La Chaux-de-Fonds and Biel/Bienne.
- Regio:
  - hourly service to La Chaux-de-Fonds and Biel/Bienne.
  - hourly service to Moutier; increases to a half-hourly service on weekdays to Malleray-Bévilard or Moutier at various times during the day.
