= Sonceboz-Sombeval–Moutier railway =

Railway line in Switzerland

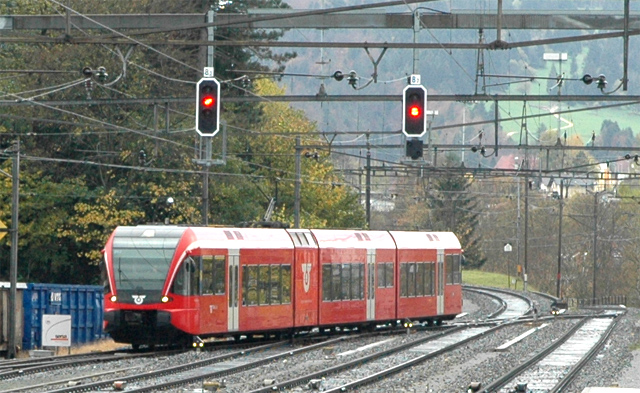
- GTW multiple unit—still owned by BLS in 2006—in Moutier

Overview
- Owner: Swiss Federal Railways
- Line number: 226
- Termini: Sonceboz-Sombeval; Moutier

Technical
- Line length: 25.1 km (15.6 mi)
- Number of tracks: 1
- Track gauge: 1,435 mm (4 ft 8 1/2 in)
- Electrification: 15 kV 16.7 Hz AC overhead catenary

The Sonceboz-Sombeval–Moutier railway is a single-track standard gauge railway line of the Swiss Federal Railways (SBB).

== History ==
The line from Biel/Bienne via Sonceboz-Sombeval to Moutier was built by the Jura bernois (JB) and was part of the international connection from Bern to Delémont and on to Belfort via Delle or Basel. The Biel/Bienne–Sonceboz-Sombeval–Tavannes section was opened along with the Sonceboz-Sombeval–Convers(–La Chaux-de-Fonds) line on 30 April 1874. Two years later, on 16 December 1876, the Tavannes–Court section was opened together with the Moutier–Delémont railway. The intermediate Court–Moutier section followed on 24 May 1877.

The Jura bernois changed its name to Jura–Bern–Luzern (JBL) in 1884. The JBL merged with the Western Switzerland–Simplon Company (Compagnie de la Suisse Occidentale et du Simplon, SOS) on 1 January 1890 to form the Jura–Simplon Railway (Compagnie des Chemins de Fer Jura–Simplon, JS). The JS was one of the five major private railway companies in Switzerland, which were nationalised and integrated to form the Swiss Federal Railways (SBB) on 1 May 1903.

Since the opening of the Grenchenberg Tunnel on 1 October 1915, the direct trains from Biel to Delémont have used the shorter and less steep line via Grenchen. The Sonceboz-Sombeval–Moutier section of the line, which as a result became a branch line, has been operated electrically since 15 July 1934.

== Route description ==
The line runs out of Sonceboz-Sombeval station parallel to the line to Chaux-de-Fonds and after a long right turn, its climbs up the valley and passes through the tunnel under the Col de Pierre Pertuis. In Tavannes, travellers have the opportunity to switch to the narrow-gauge trains on the line to Noirmont of the Chemins de fer du Jura (CJ). The line to Moutier continues along the Birs via Reconvilier and Malleray-Bévilard. After crossing the narrow valley of Court, the line reaches Moutier where it meets the newer and shorter connection from Biel under the Grenchenberg plateau.

== Operations ==
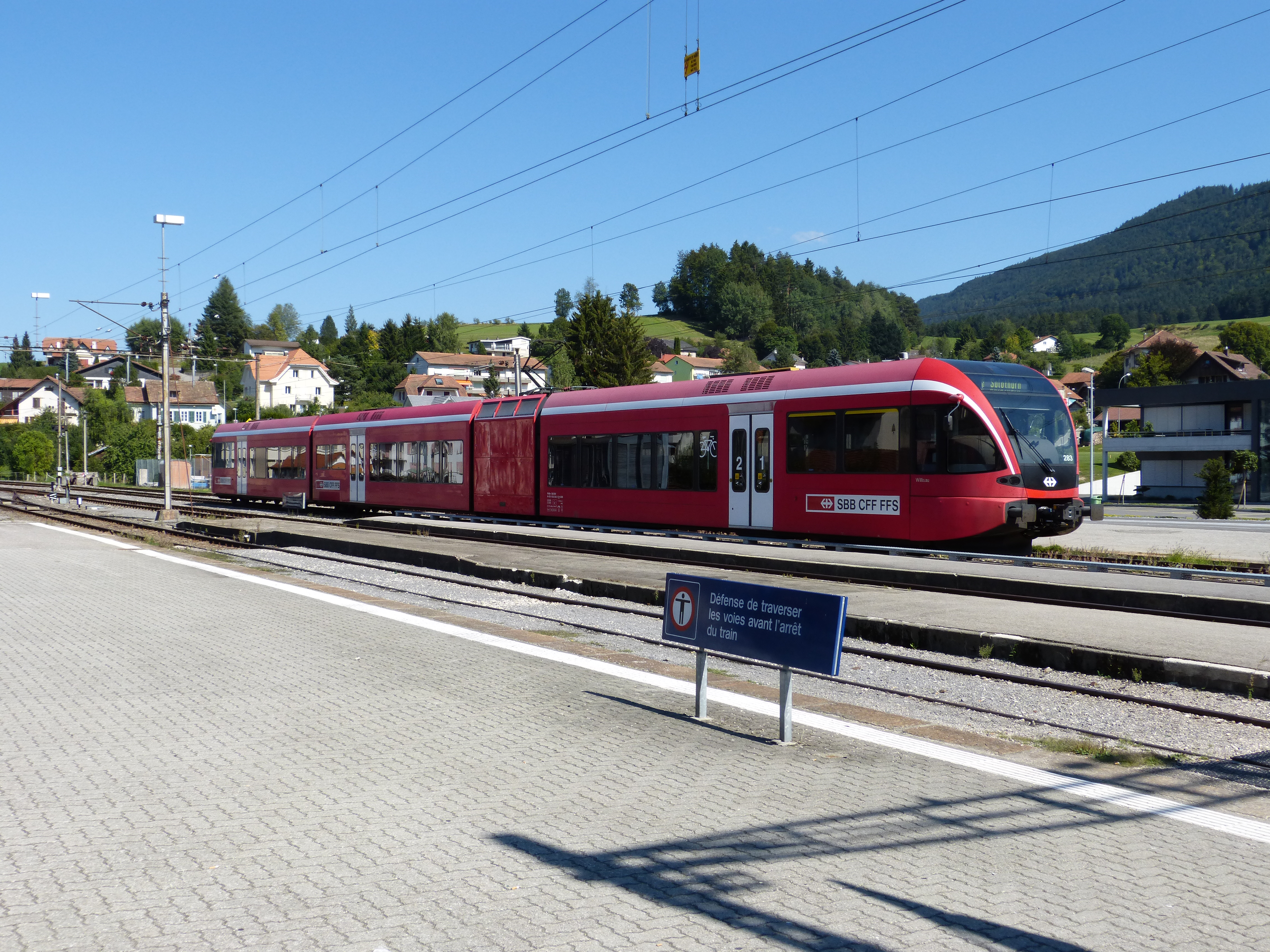
EMU RABe 526 283 departing Tavannes station.

Since the opening of the Grenchenberg Tunnel in 1915 only regional trains have operated on the Sonceboz-Sombeval–Moutier line. Today one Regio service runs each hour from Biel via Sonceboz to Moutier and continues on the Solothurn–Moutier railway to Solothurn. This train is split or joined in Sonceboz-Sombeval, with the other part of the train going on to La Chaux-de-Fonds. The SBB took over 13 GTW sets from the BLS for the service in 2014.
