= Moutier railway station =

Railway station in Moutier, Switzerland

Moutier
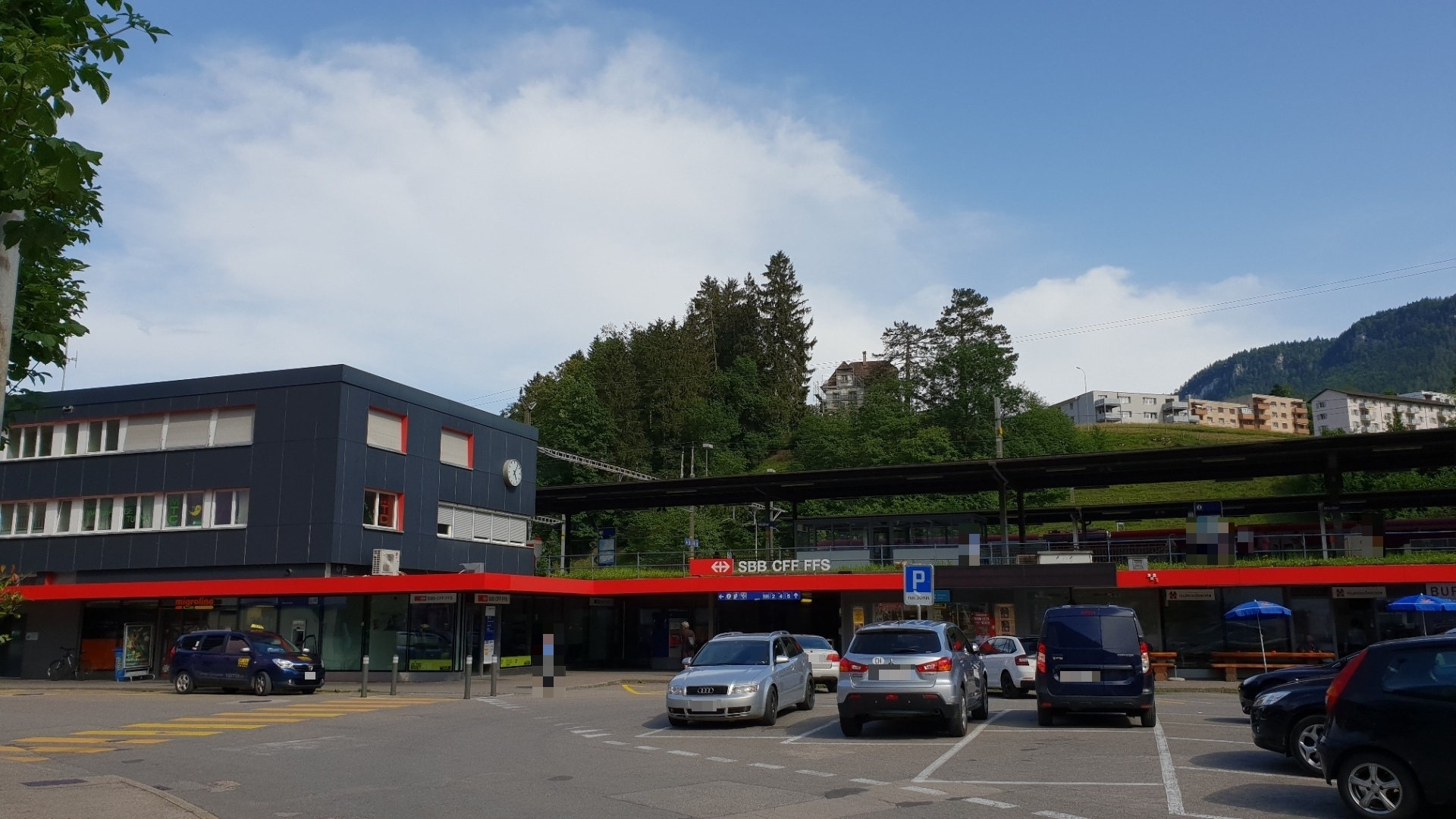
- The station building in 2018

General information
- Location: Moutier; Switzerland
- Coordinates: 47°16′51″N 7°22′52″E
- Elevation: 529 m (1,736 ft)
- Owner: Swiss Federal Railways
- Lines: Basel–Biel/Bienne line; Solothurn–Moutier line; Sonceboz-Sombeval–Moutier line
- Distance: 73.4 km (45.6 mi) from Bern
- Platforms: 3
- Tracks: 6
- Train operators: BLS AG; Swiss Federal Railways
- Connections: CarPostal SA buses

Construction
- Parking: Yes (109 spaces)
- Cycle facilities: Yes (62 spaces)
- Accessible: No

Other information
- Station code: 8500105 (MOU)
- Fare zone: 344 (Libero); 15 (Vagabond)

Passengers
- 2023: 3'800 per weekday (SBB)

Services
Preceding station	SBB CFF FFS	Following station
Grenchen Nord towards Lausanne	IC 51	Delémont towards Basel SBB
Terminus	R42	Court towards Biel/Bienne
Terminus	R42	Court towards Sonceboz-Sombeval
Preceding station	BLS	Following station
Grenchen Nord towards Biel/Bienne	IR 56	Delémont towards Basel SBB
Location

Moutier railway station (French: Gare de Moutier) is a railway station in the municipality of Moutier, in the Swiss canton of Jura. It is a Keilbahnhof and an intermediate stop on the Basel–Biel/Bienne line and the terminus of the Solothurn–Moutier and Sonceboz-Sombeval–Moutier lines.

== Services ==
As of the December 2025 timetable change, the following services stop at Moutier:

- InterCity / InterRegio: half-hourly service between Biel/Bienne and Basel SBB and hourly service to Lausanne.
- Regio: hourly service over the Sonceboz-Sombeval–Moutier line to Sonceboz-Sombeval or Biel/Bienne.
