= Haute-Sorne =

- Municipality
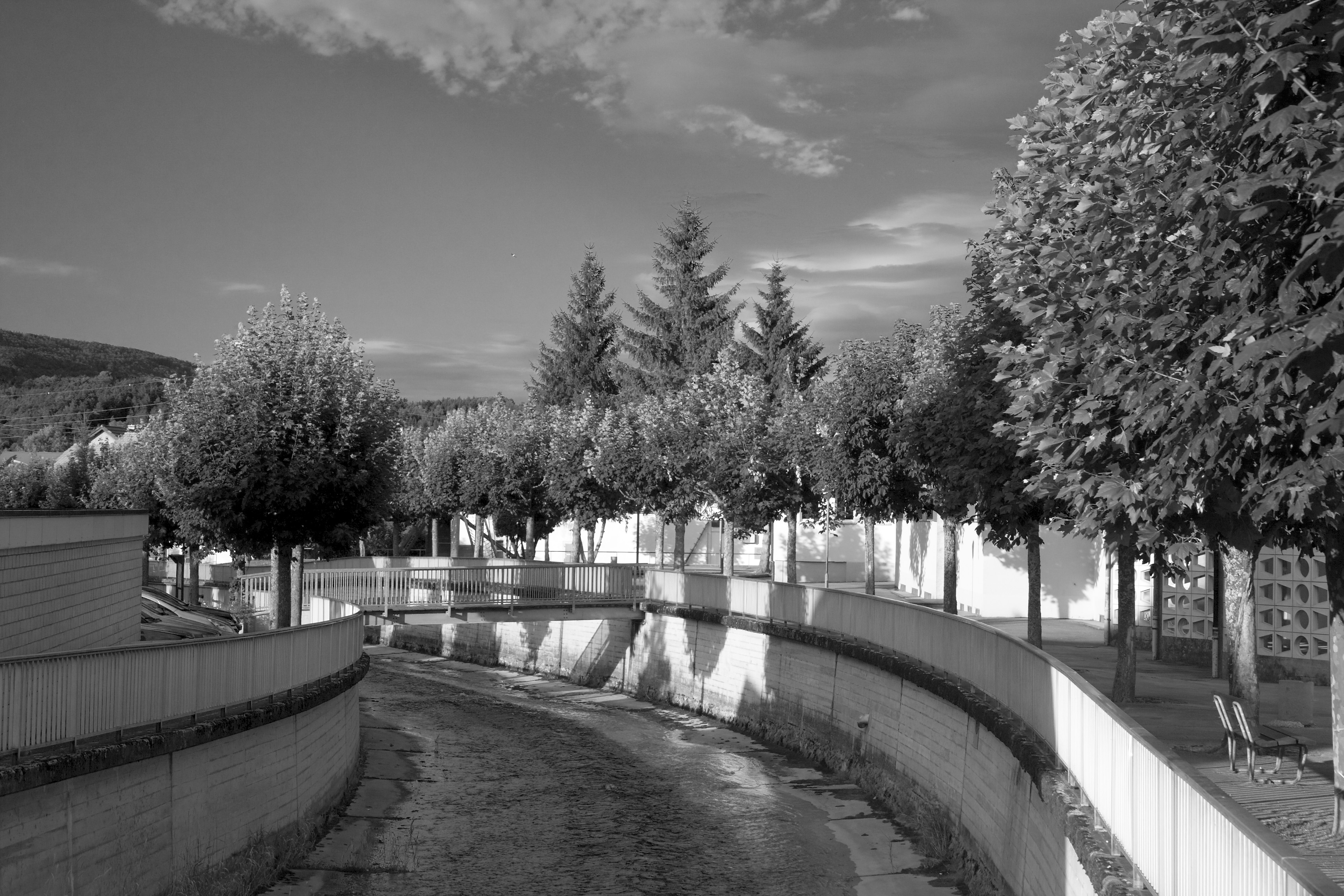
- Sorne river at Bassecourt

- Flag Coat of arms
- Location of Haute-Sorne
- Location within Switzerland Location within Canton of Jura
- Coordinates: 47°21′N 07°14′E
- Country: Switzerland
- Canton: Jura
- District: Delémont

Government
  - Executive: Conseil communal with 9 members
  - Mayor: Maire; Eric Dobler (as of 2026)
  - Parliament: Conseil général with 33 members

Area
  - Total: 71.06 km^{2} (27.44 sq mi)

Population (2020)
  - Total: 7,167
  - Density: 100.9/km^{2} (261.2/sq mi)
- Time zone: UTC+01:00 (CET)
  - Summer (DST): UTC+02:00 (CEST)
- Postal code: 2854
- SFOS number: 6729
- ISO 3166 code: CH-JU
- Surrounded by: Boécourt, Develier
- Website: https://www.haute-sorne.ch/

Haute-Sorne (French pronunciation: [ot sɔʁn], lit. 'Upper Sorne') is a municipality in the district of Delémont in the canton of Jura in Switzerland. On 1 January 2013 the former municipalities of Bassecourt, Courfaivre, Glovelier, Soulce and Undervelier merged to form the new municipality of Haute-Sorne.

== History ==
Bassecourt is first mentioned in 1160 as Baressicort. In 1184 it was first mentioned by its German name, Altdorf. The hamlet of Berlincourt was first mentioned in 1303 as Burlincort. Courfaivre is first mentioned in 1147 as Curfavro. Glovelier is first mentioned in 1139 as Lolenviler. Soulce is first mentioned in 1148 as Sulza. The municipality was formerly known by its German name Sulz, however, that name is no longer used. Undervelier is first mentioned in 1179 as Undreviller. The municipality was formerly known by its unknown name Underswiler, however, that name is no longer used.

== Geography ==
Aerial view, from front to back: Glovelier, Bassecourt, Courfaivre (1953)

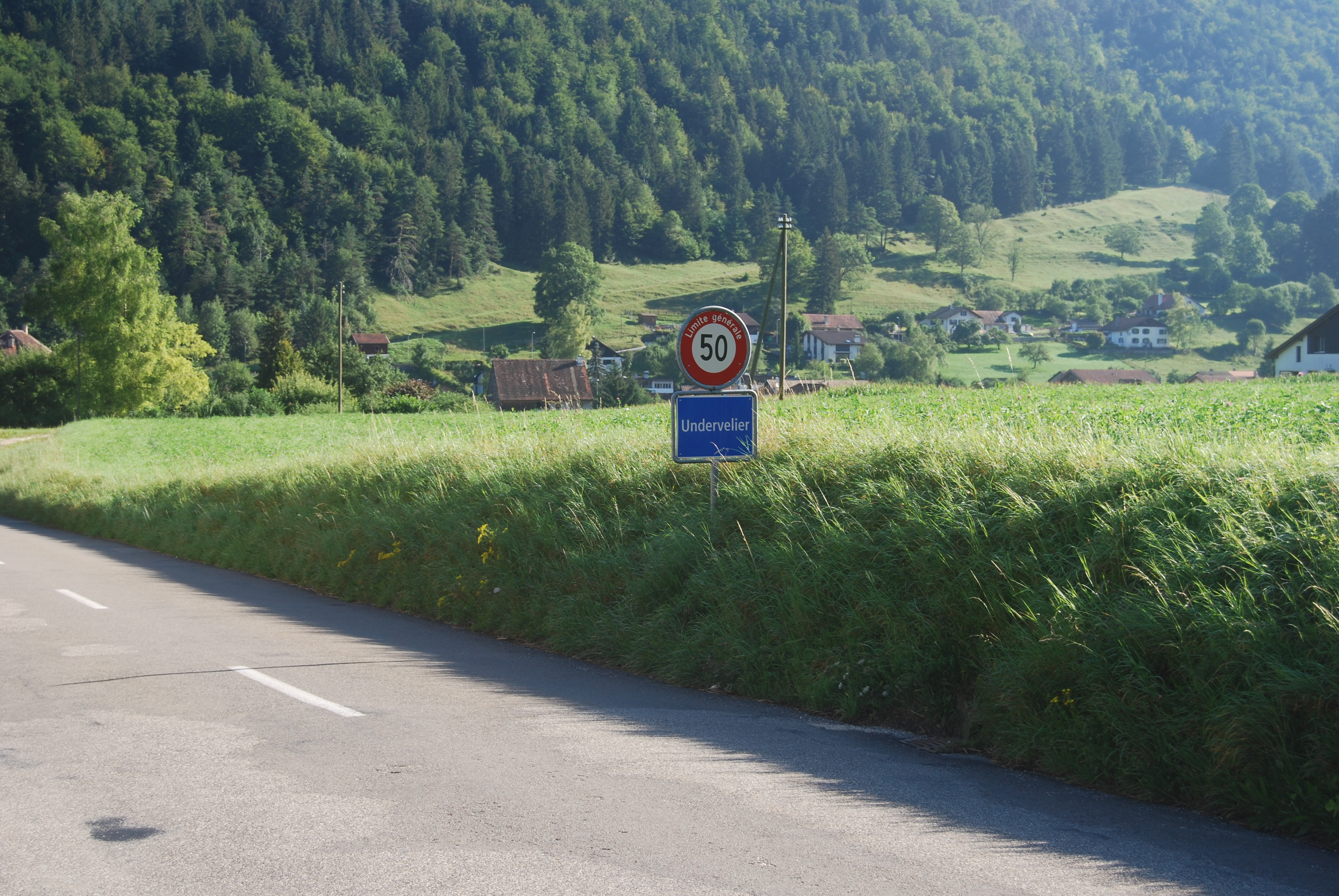
Undervelier village

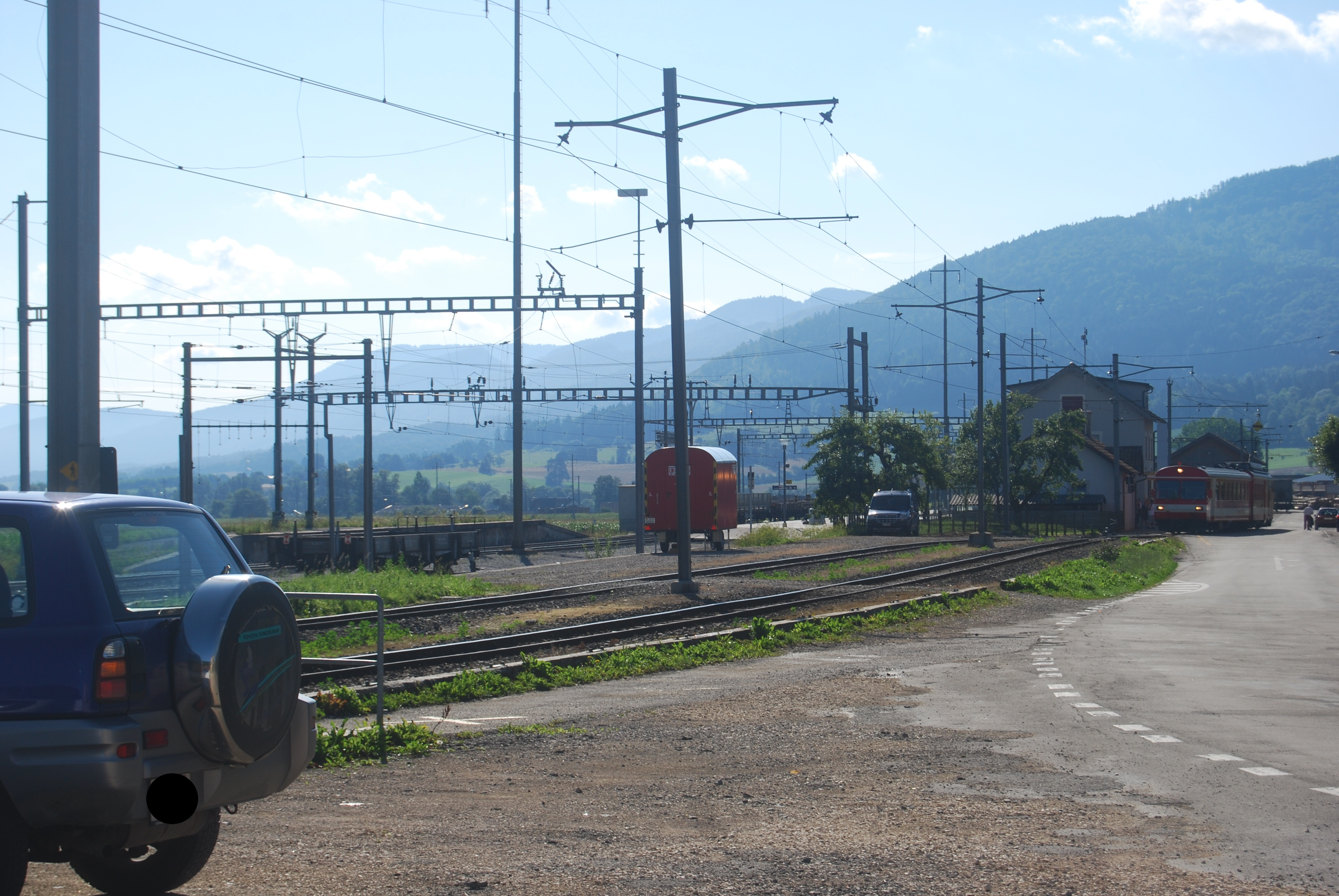
Glovelier village train station

The former municipalities that now make up Haute-Sorne have a total combined area of 71.04 km^{2} (27.43 sq mi).

Bassecourt had an area of 15.57 km^{2} (6.01 sq mi). Of this area, 5.84 km^{2} (2.25 mi^{2}) or 37.5% is used for agricultural purposes, while 7.77 km^{2} (3.00 mi^{2}) or 49.9% is forested. Of the rest of the land, 1.9 km^{2} (0.73 mi^{2}) or 12.2% is settled (buildings or roads), 0.06 km^{2} (15 acres) or 0.4% is either rivers or lakes and 0.01 km^{2} (2.5 acres) or 0.1% is unproductive land. The former municipality is located along the Sorne river in the Delemont valley. It lies at the intersection of the Delémont-La Chaux-de-Fonds and the Porrentruy-Biel/Bienne roads. It consists of the village of Bassecourt and the hamlet of Berlincourt.

Courfaivre had an area of 12.4 km^{2} (4.79 sq mi). Of this area, 6.33 km^{2} (2.44 mi^{2}) or 51.0% is used for agricultural purposes, while 4.91 km^{2} (1.90 mi^{2}) or 39.6% is forested. Of the rest of the land, 1.04 km^{2} (0.40 mi^{2}) or 8.4% is settled (buildings or roads), 0.07 km^{2} (17 acres) or 0.6% is either rivers or lakes and 0.06 km^{2} (15 acres) or 0.5% is unproductive land. The former municipality is located on the Delémont-Glovelier road on the right bank of the Sorne river.

Glovelier had an area of 14.34 km^{2} (5.54 sq mi). Of this area, 5.99 km^{2} (2.31 mi^{2}) or 41.8% is used for agricultural purposes, while 6.71 km^{2} (2.59 mi^{2}) or 46.8% is forested. Of the rest of the land, 1.57 km^{2} (0.61 mi^{2}) or 10.9% is settled (buildings or roads), 0.03 km^{2} (7.4 acres) or 0.2% is either rivers or lakes and 0.03 km^{2} (7.4 acres) or 0.2% is unproductive land. The former municipality is located on the western end of the Delemont valley. The village lies at the intersection of the old road from Porrentruy to Biel and from Delemont to La Chaux-de-Fonds. It consists of the village of Glovelier and the hamlet of Sceut.

Soulce had an area of 14.77 km^{2} (5.70 sq mi). Of this area, 3.98 km^{2} (1.54 mi^{2}) or 26.9% is used for agricultural purposes, while 10.44 km^{2} (4.03 mi^{2}) or 70.7% is forested. Of the rest of the land, 0.28 km^{2} (0.11 mi^{2}) or 1.9% is settled (buildings or roads), 0.01 km^{2} (2.5 acres) or 0.1% is either rivers or lakes and 0.04 km^{2} (9.9 acres) or 0.3% is unproductive land. The former municipality is located in a small valley east of Undervelier. The village grew up along a small stream in the valley.

Undervelier had an area of 13.98 km^{2} (5.40 sq mi). Of this area, 3.38 km^{2} (1.31 mi^{2}) or 24.2% is used for agricultural purposes, while 10.25 km^{2} (3.96 mi^{2}) or 73.3% is forested. Of the rest of the land, 0.3 km^{2} (0.12 mi^{2}) or 2.1% is settled (buildings or roads), 0.02 km^{2} (4.9 acres) or 0.1% is either rivers or lakes and 0.03 km^{2} (7.4 acres) or 0.2% is unproductive land. The former municipality is located between two of the Sorne river canyons and at the foot of Pichoux mountain.

== Demographics ==
The total population of Haute-Sorne (as of December 2020) is 7,167.

== Historic Population ==
The historical population is given in the following chart:

== Heritage sites of national significance ==
The Saint-Germain-d'Auxerre Church in Courfaivre, the Farm House at Au Village 17 and the prehistoric shelter at Le Mont in Glovelier is listed as a Swiss heritage site of national significance. The entire village of Soulce and the entire Les Forges area are designated as part of the Inventory of Swiss Heritage Sites.

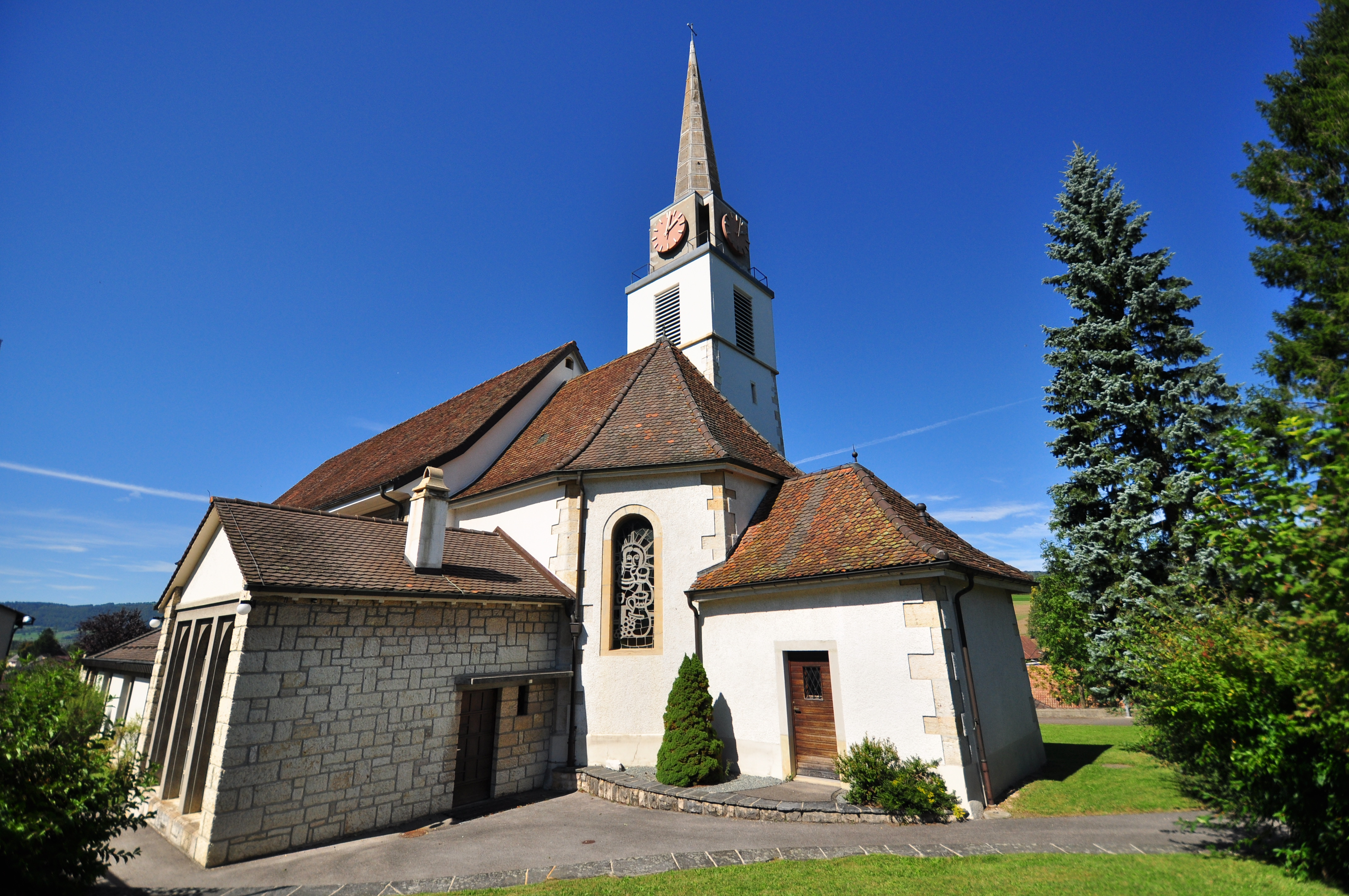
Saint-Germain-d'Auxerre Church

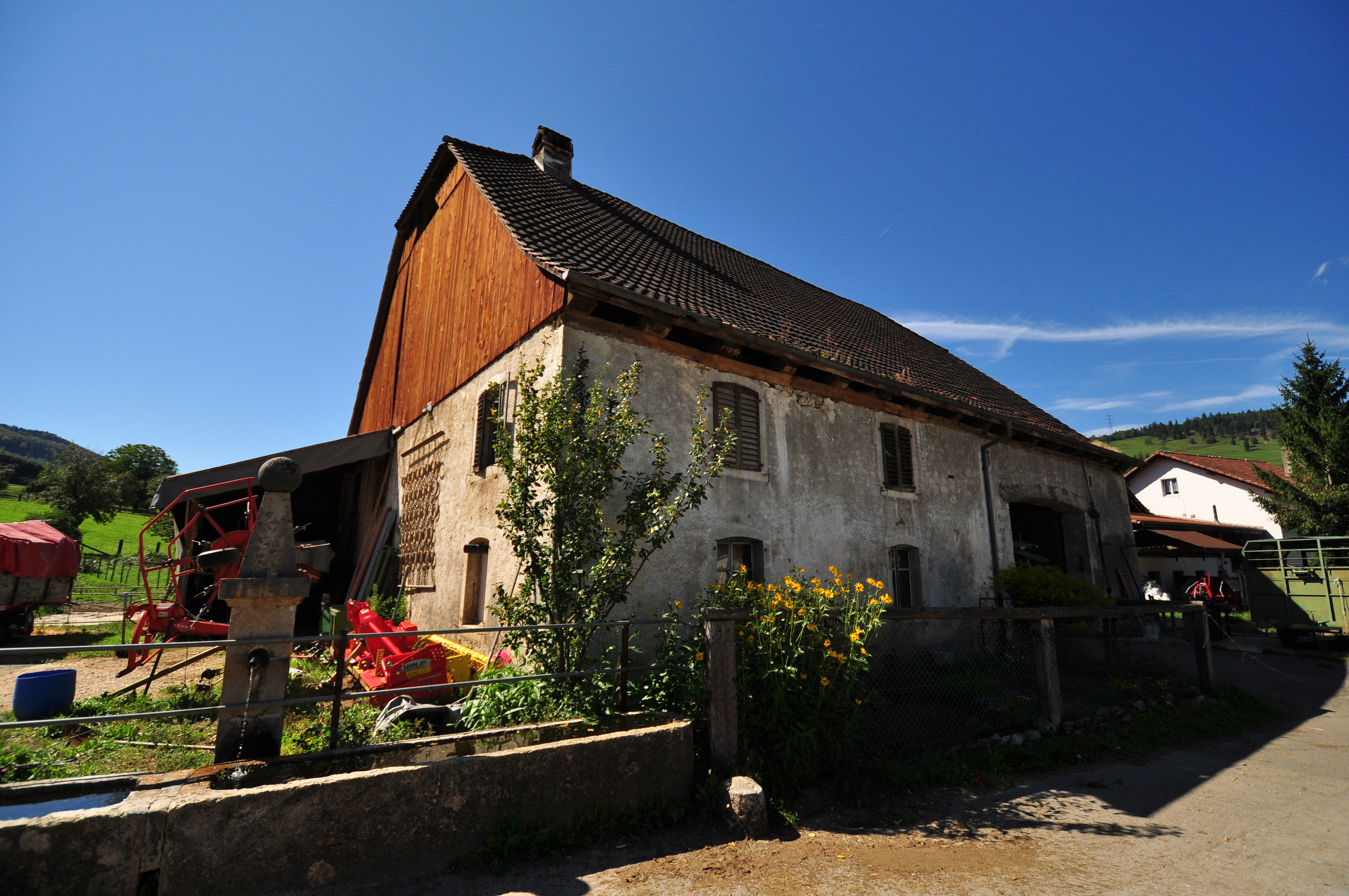
Glovelier farm house

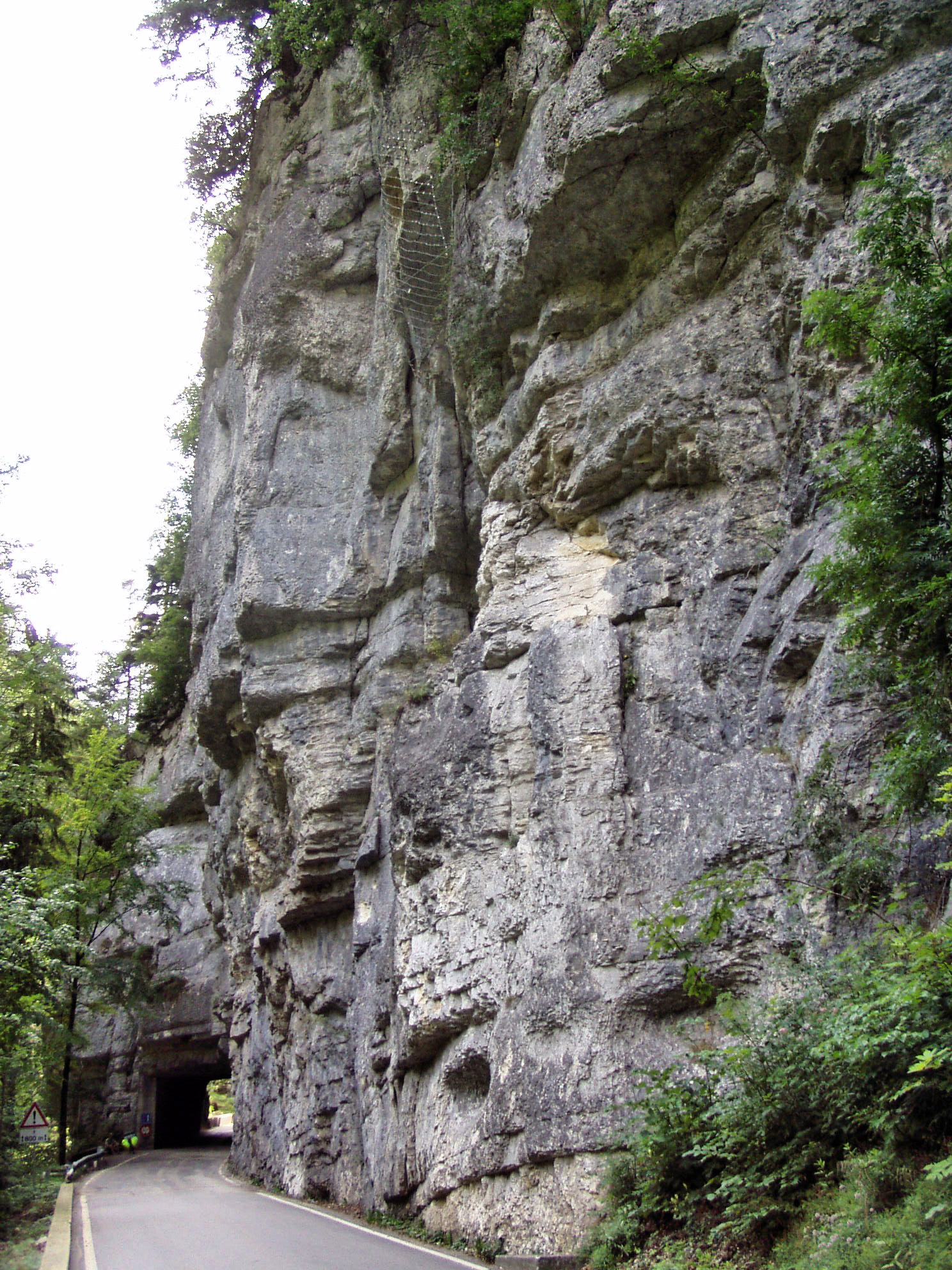
Road through one of the Gorges of Pichoux

== Sights ==
Notable sights in the Undervelier area include the cave of Sainte-Colombe and the Gorges of Pichoux. Other sights include the Vellerat Posé because of its greenery and the chapel Place Roland Béguelin built by Jeanne Bueche and André Bréchet's stained glass windows.

== Transportation ==
The municipality has four railway stations: Glovelier, Bassecourt, Courfaivre, and Combe-Tabeillon. The first three are located on the Delémont–Delle line and have regular service to Biel/Bienne, Olten, and Meroux (in France). In addition, Glovelier and Combe-Tabeillon are on the narrow-gauge La Chaux-de-Fonds–Glovelier line that links Glovelier with La Chaux-de-Fonds.
