= Bollement railway station =

Railway station in Saint-Brais, Switzerland

Bollement
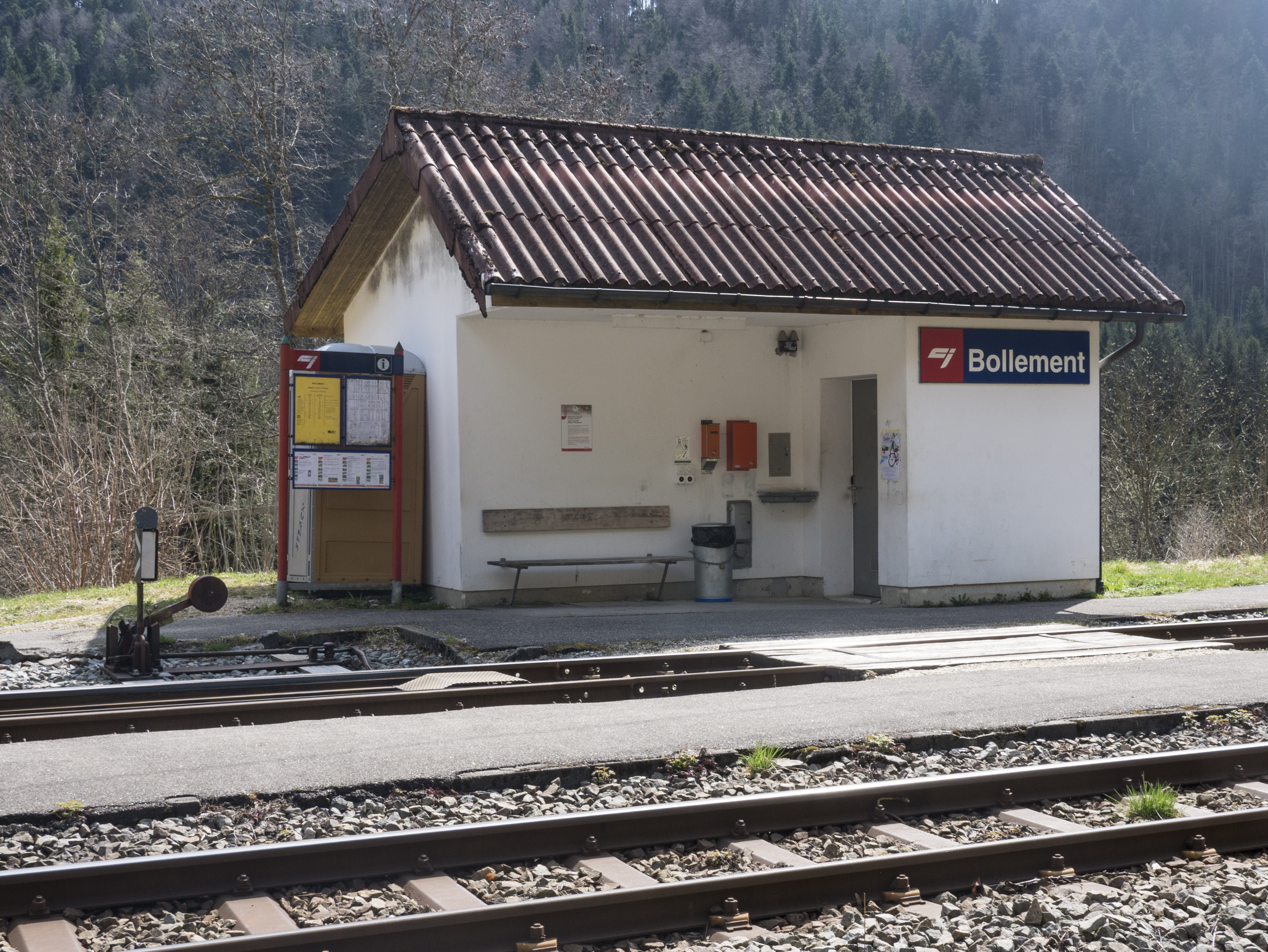
- The station platform in 2017

General information
- Location: Saint-Brais, Jura; Switzerland
- Coordinates: 47°17′50″N 7°07′26″E
- Elevation: 807 m (2,648 ft)
- Owner: Chemins de fer du Jura
- Line: La Chaux-de-Fonds–Glovelier line
- Distance: 16.9 km (10.5 mi) from Le Noirmont
- Platforms: 1 island platform; 1 side platform
- Tracks: 2
- Train operators: Chemins de fer du Jura

Construction
- Accessible: No

Other information
- Station code: 8500196 (BOLL)
- Fare zone: 40 (Vagabond)

Services
Preceding station	Chemins de fer du Jura	Following station
La Combe towards La Chaux-de-Fonds	R36	Combe-Tabeillon towards Glovelier
Location
- Location within Switzerland Location within Canton of Jura

Bollement railway station (French: Gare de Bollement) is a railway station in the municipality of Saint-Brais, in the Swiss canton of Jura. It is an intermediate stop and a request stop on the 1,000 mm (3 ft 3 3/8 in) metre gauge La Chaux-de-Fonds–Glovelier line of the Chemins de fer du Jura.

== Services ==
As of the December 2023 timetable change, the following services stop at Bollement:

- Regio: hourly service between La Chaux-de-Fonds and Glovelier.
