= La Combe railway station =

Railway station in Montfaucon, Switzerland

La Combe
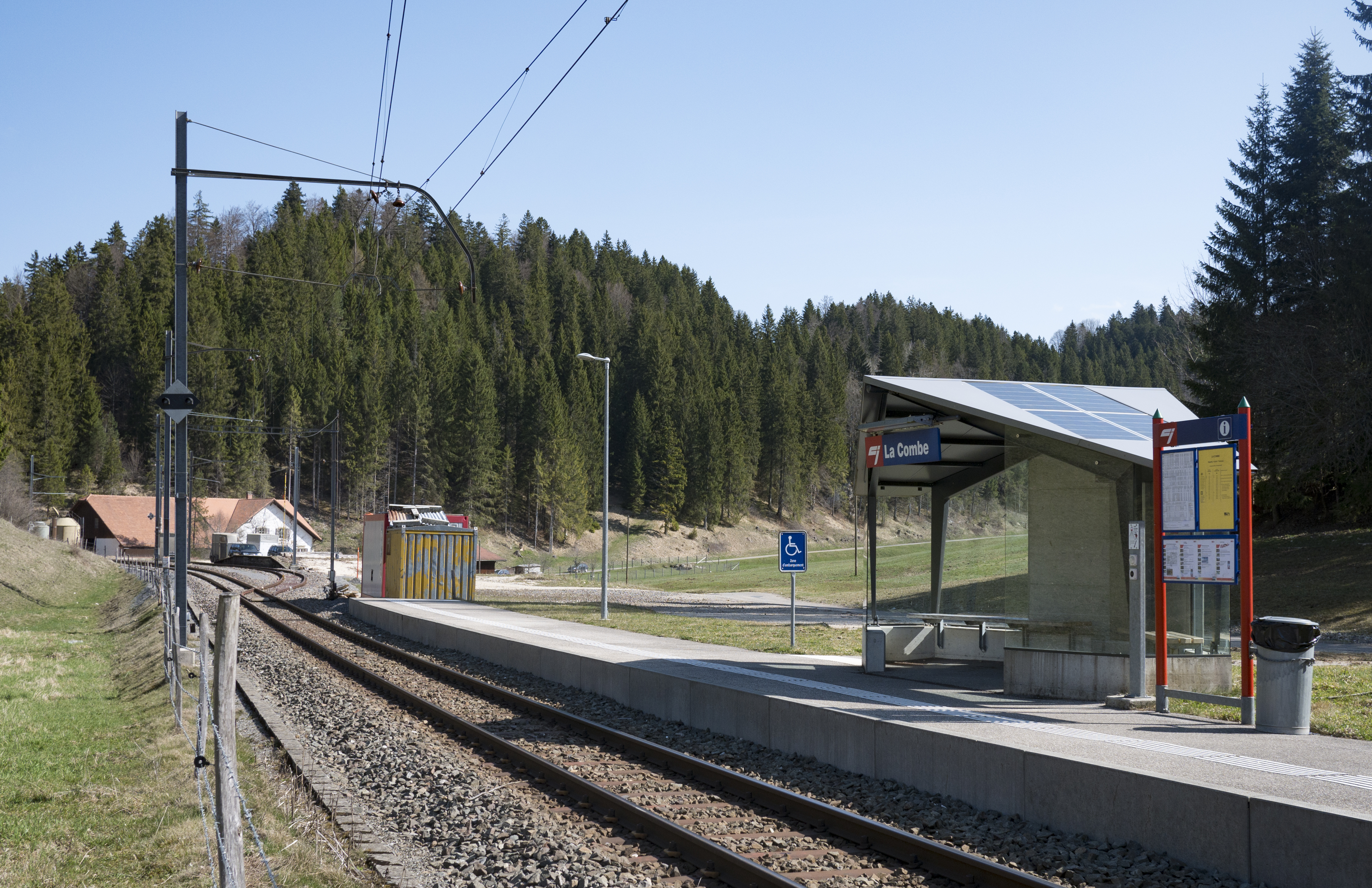
- The station platform in 2017

General information
- Location: Montfaucon, Jura; Switzerland
- Coordinates: 47°17′06″N 7°06′00″E
- Elevation: 843 m (2,766 ft)
- Owner: Chemins de fer du Jura
- Line: La Chaux-de-Fonds–Glovelier line
- Distance: 14.6 km (9.1 mi) from Le Noirmont
- Platforms: 1 side platform
- Tracks: 1
- Train operators: Chemins de fer du Jura

Construction
- Accessible: Yes

Other information
- Station code: 8500195 (COMB)
- Fare zone: 41 (Vagabond)

Services
Preceding station	Chemins de fer du Jura	Following station
Pré-Petitjean towards La Chaux-de-Fonds	R36	Bollement towards Glovelier
Location
- Location within Switzerland Location within Canton of Jura

La Combe railway station (French: Gare de La Combe) is a railway station in the municipality of Montfaucon, in the Swiss canton of Jura. It is an intermediate stop and a request stop on the 1,000 mm (3 ft 3 3/8 in) metre gauge La Chaux-de-Fonds–Glovelier line of the Chemins de fer du Jura.

== Services ==
As of the December 2023 timetable change, the following services stop at La Combe:

- Regio: hourly service between La Chaux-de-Fonds and Glovelier.
