= Combe-Tabeillon railway station =

Railway station in Haute-Sorne, Switzerland

Combe-Tabeillon
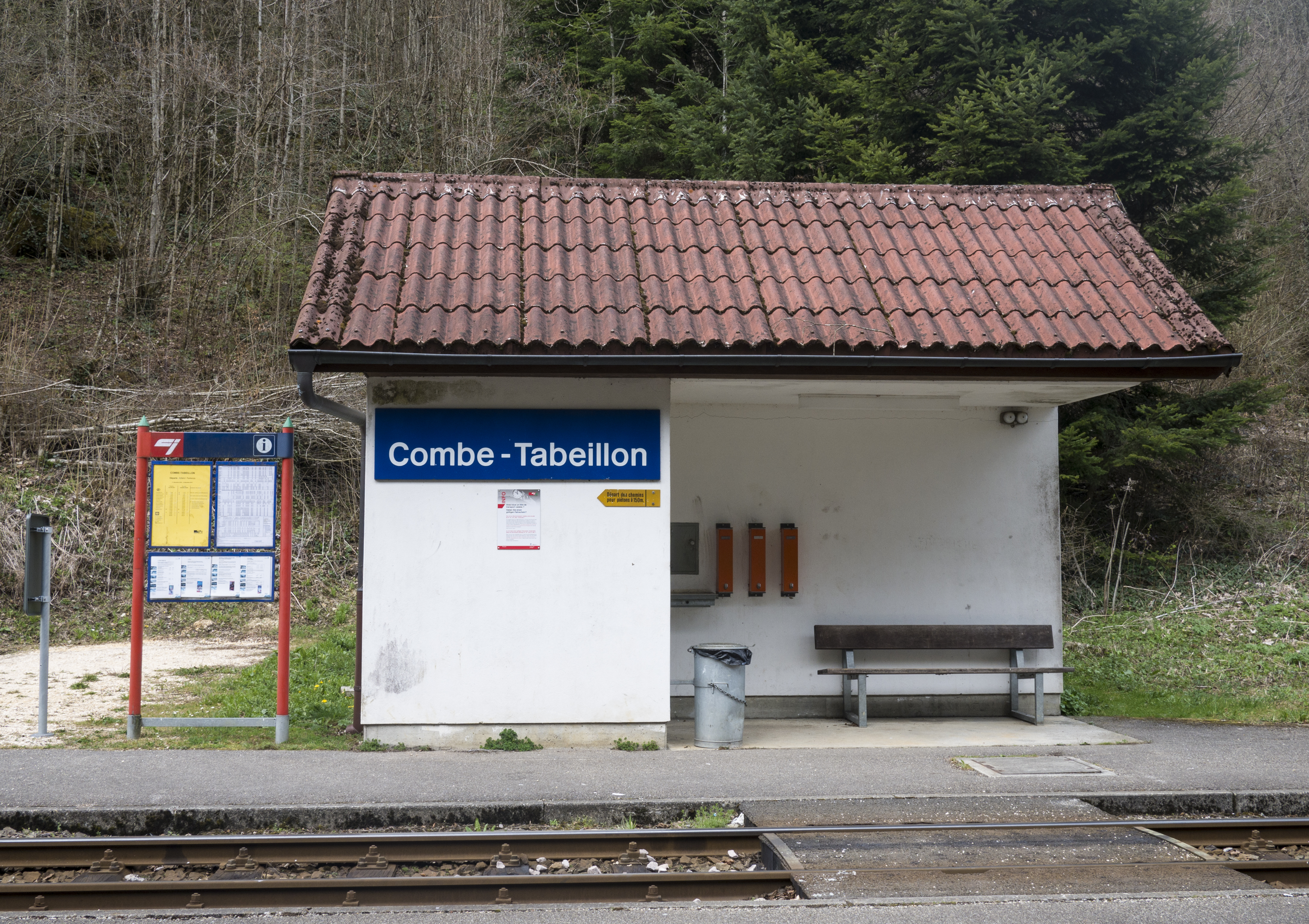
- The station platform in 2017

General information
- Location: Haute-Sorne, Jura; Switzerland
- Coordinates: 47°18′50″N 7°09′29″E
- Elevation: 626 m (2,054 ft)
- Owner: Chemins de fer du Jura
- Line: La Chaux-de-Fonds–Glovelier line
- Distance: 24.9 km (15.5 mi) from Le Noirmont
- Platforms: 1 island platform; 1 side platform
- Tracks: 2
- Train operators: Chemins de fer du Jura

Construction
- Accessible: No

Other information
- Station code: 8500199 (COTA)
- Fare zone: 40 (Vagabond)

Services
Preceding station	Chemins de fer du Jura	Following station
Bollement towards La Chaux-de-Fonds	R36	Glovelier Terminus
Location
- Location within Switzerland Location within Canton of Jura

Combe-Tabeillon railway station (French: Gare de Combe-Tabeillon) is a railway station in the municipality of Haute-Sorne, in the Swiss canton of Jura. It is located on the 1,000 mm (3 ft 3 3/8 in) La Chaux-de-Fonds–Glovelier line of the Chemins de fer du Jura. Combe-Tabeillon is a rare example of a dead-end station, as it is located within a zig zag.

== Services ==
As of the December 2023 timetable change, the following services stop at Combe-Tabeillon:

- Regio: hourly service between La Chaux-de-Fonds and Glovelier.
