= La Cibourg railway station =

Railway station in La Chaux-de-Fonds, Switzerland

La Cibourg
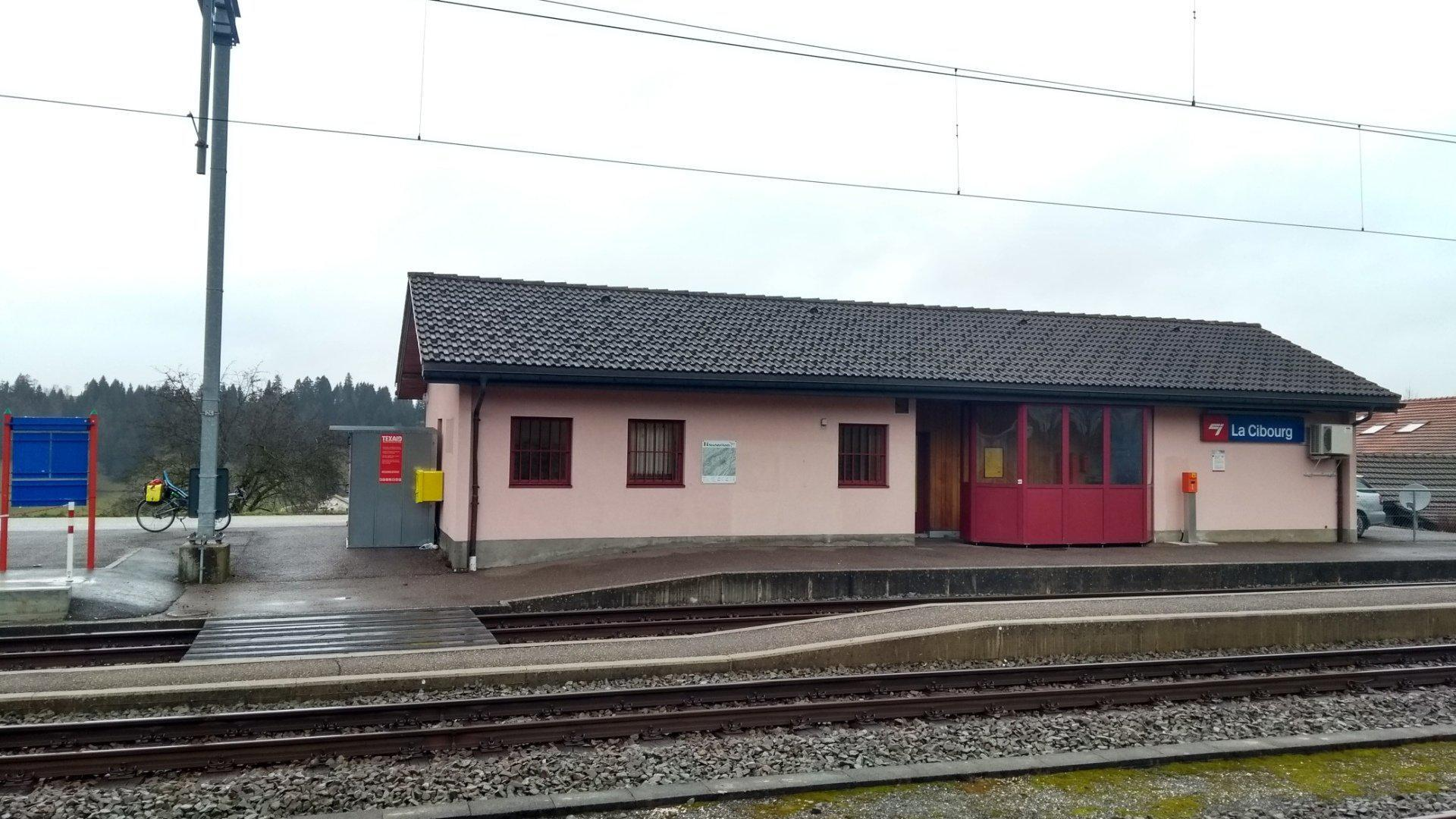
- The station building in 2019

General information
- Location: La Chaux-de-Fonds, Neuchâtel; Switzerland
- Coordinates: 47°07′19″N 6°53′02″E
- Elevation: 1,036 m (3,399 ft)
- Owner: Chemins de fer du Jura
- Line: La Chaux-de-Fonds–Glovelier line
- Distance: 38.0 km (23.6 mi) from Tavannes
- Platforms: 2 (1 island platform)
- Tracks: 2
- Train operators: Chemins de fer du Jura

Construction
- Accessible: No

Other information
- Station code: 8500179 (CIB)
- Fare zone: 21 (Onde Verte)

Services
Preceding station	Chemins de fer du Jura	Following station
La Chaux-de-Fonds-Est towards La Chaux-de-Fonds	R36	La Ferrière towards Glovelier
Location
- Location within Switzerland Location within Canton of Neuchâtel

La Cibourg railway station (French: Gare de La Cibourg) is a railway station in the municipality of La Chaux-de-Fonds, in the Swiss canton of Neuchâtel. It is an intermediate stop and a request stop on the 1,000 mm (3 ft 3 3/8 in) metre gauge La Chaux-de-Fonds–Glovelier line of the Chemins de fer du Jura.

== Services ==
As of the December 2023 timetable change, the following services stop at La Cibourg:

- Regio: hourly service between La Chaux-de-Fonds and Glovelier.
