= La Ferrière railway station =

Railway station in La Ferrière, Switzerland

La Ferrière
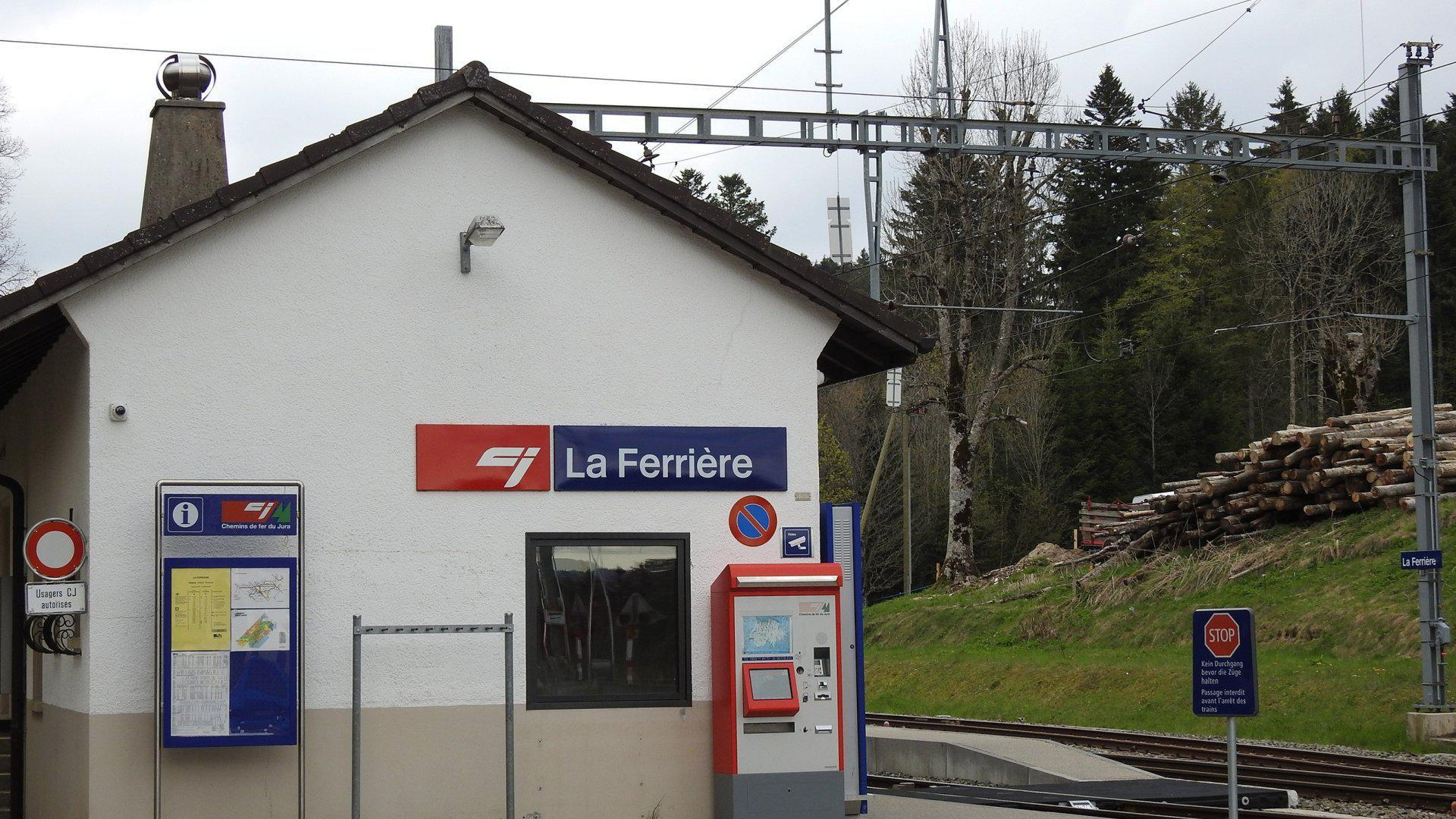
- The station building in 2019

General information
- Location: La Ferrière, Bern; Switzerland
- Coordinates: 47°08′35″N 6°53′42″E
- Elevation: 1,005 m (3,297 ft)
- Owner: Chemins de fer du Jura
- Line: La Chaux-de-Fonds–Glovelier line
- Distance: 34.9 km (21.7 mi) from Tavannes
- Platforms: 2 (1 island platform)
- Tracks: 3
- Train operators: Chemins de fer du Jura

Construction
- Accessible: No

Other information
- Station code: 8500178 (FER)
- Fare zone: 31 (Onde Verte)

Services
Preceding station	Chemins de fer du Jura	Following station
La Cibourg towards La Chaux-de-Fonds	R36	La Chaux-d'Abel towards Glovelier
Location
- Location within Switzerland Location within Canton of Bern

La Ferrière railway station (French: Gare de La Ferrière) is a railway station in the municipality of La Ferrière, in the Swiss canton of Bern. It is an intermediate stop and a request stop on the 1,000 mm (3 ft 3 3/8 in) metre gauge La Chaux-de-Fonds–Glovelier line of the Chemins de fer du Jura.

== Services ==
As of the December 2023 timetable change, the following services stop at La Ferrière:

- Regio: hourly service between La Chaux-de-Fonds and Glovelier.
