= Bassecourt railway station =

Railway station in Haute-Sorne, Switzerland

Bassecourt
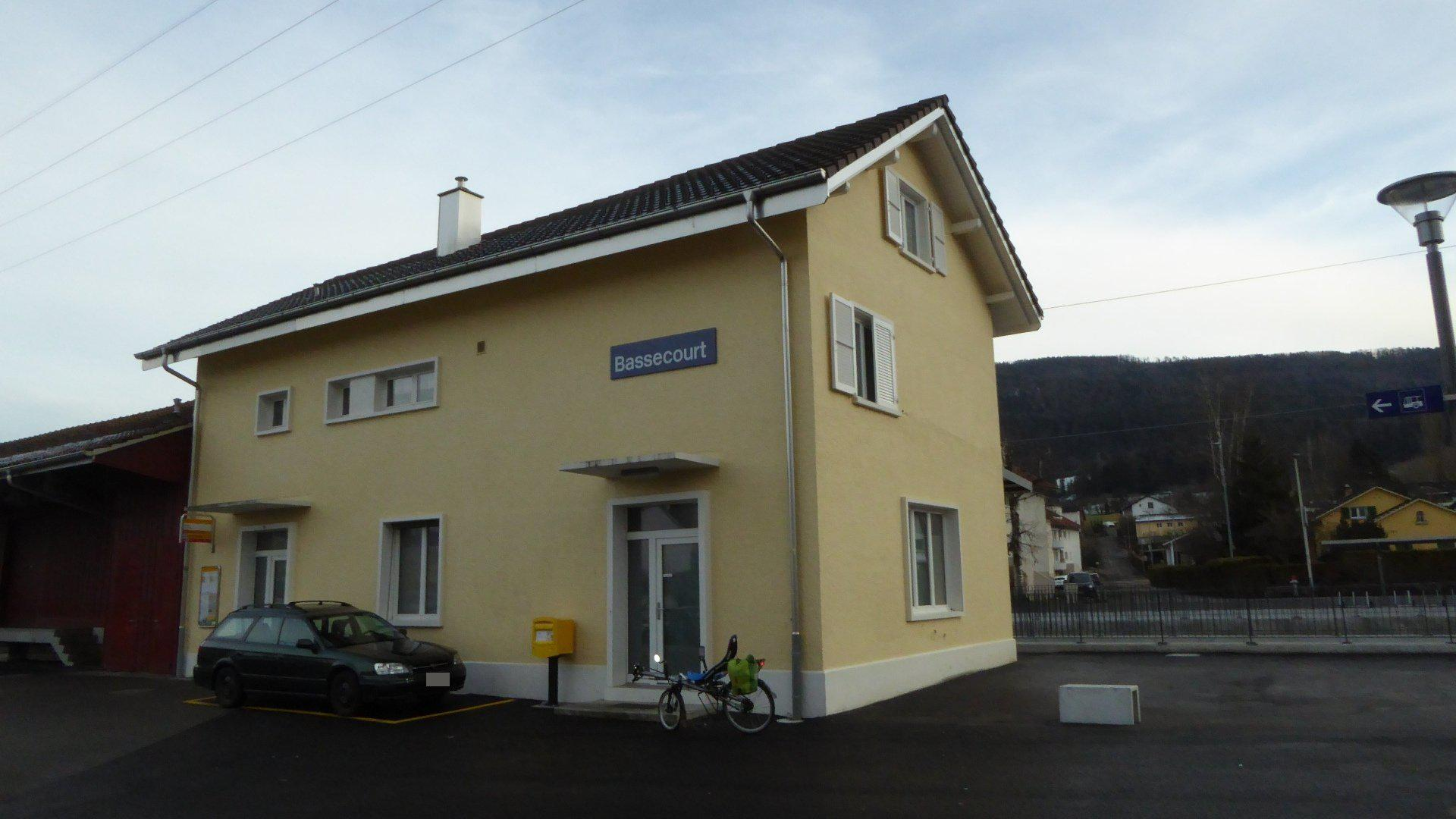
- The station building in 2019

General information
- Location: Haute-Sorne; Switzerland
- Coordinates: 47°20′12″N 7°14′49″E
- Elevation: 478 m (1,568 ft)
- Owner: Swiss Federal Railways
- Line: Delémont–Delle line
- Distance: 93.5 km (58.1 mi) from Olten
- Platforms: 2 side platforms
- Tracks: 2
- Train operators: Swiss Federal Railways
- Connections: CarPostal SA bus line

Construction
- Parking: Yes (36 spaces)
- Cycle facilities: Yes (67 spaces)
- Accessible: Yes

Other information
- Station code: 8500122 (BSC)
- Fare zone: 11 (Vagabond)

Passengers
- 2023: 1'500 per weekday (SBB)

Services
Preceding station	RER Jura	Following station
Glovelier towards Delle	R1	Courfaivre towards Delémont
Glovelier towards Bonfol	R2	Courfaivre towards Delémont
Location
- Location within Switzerland Location within Canton of Jura

Bassecourt railway station (French: Gare de Bassecourt) is a railway station in the former municipality of Bassecourt, now part of Haute-Sorne, in the Swiss canton of Jura. It is an intermediate stop on the standard gauge Delémont–Delle line of Swiss Federal Railways.

== Services ==
As of the December 2025 timetable change, the following services stop at Bassecourt:

- RER Jura: half-hourly service between Delémont and Porrentruy and hourly service to Delle and Bonfol.
