= Courfaivre railway station =

Railway station in Haute-Sorne, Switzerland

Courfaivre
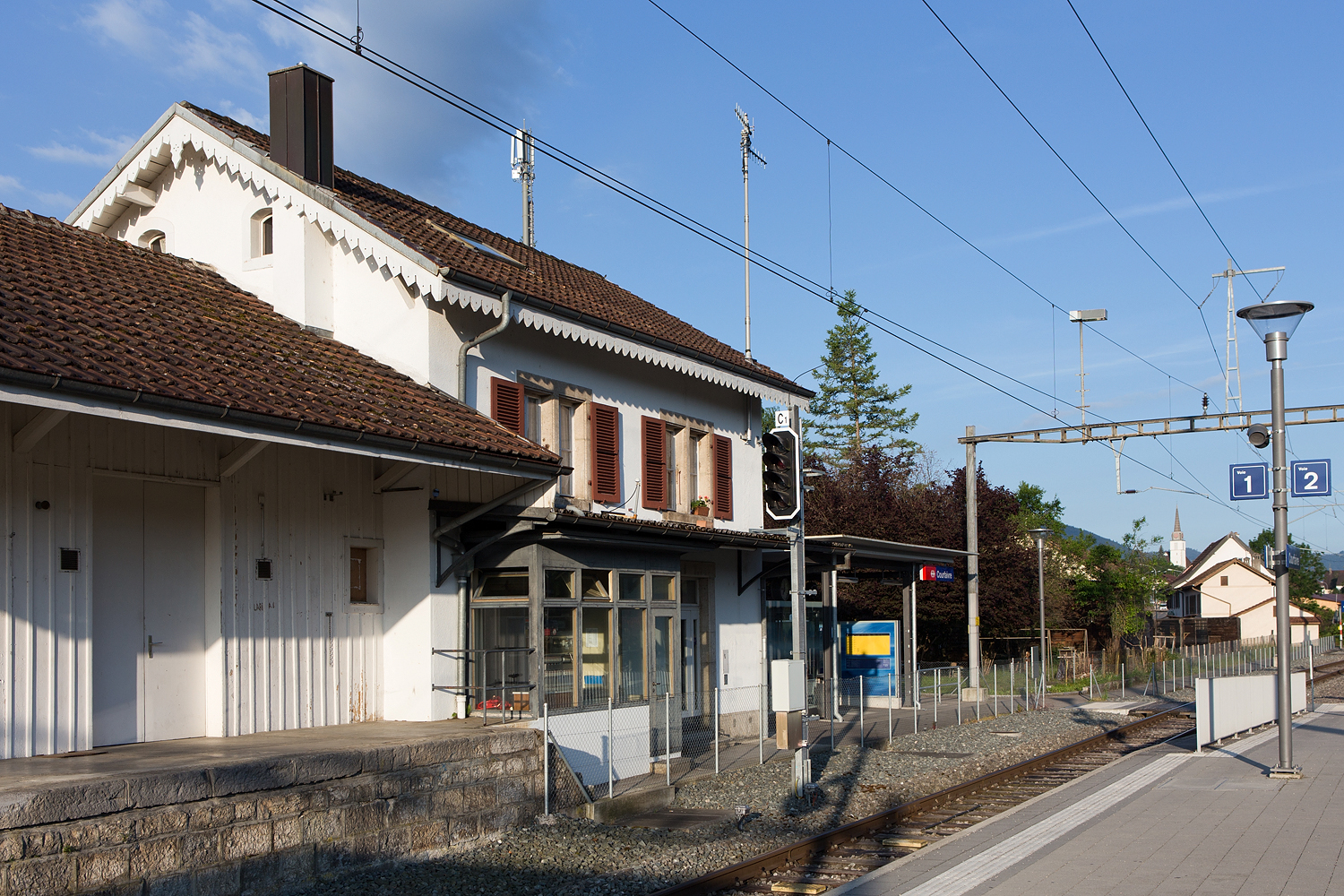
- The station building in 2015

General information
- Location: Haute-Sorne; Switzerland
- Coordinates: 47°20′06″N 7°17′28″E
- Elevation: 451 m (1,480 ft)
- Owner: Swiss Federal Railways
- Line: Delémont–Delle line
- Distance: 90.1 km (56.0 mi) from Olten
- Platforms: 2 (1 island platform)
- Tracks: 2
- Train operators: Swiss Federal Railways
- Connections: CarPostal SA bus line

Construction
- Parking: Yes (10 spaces)
- Cycle facilities: Yes (15 spaces)
- Accessible: Yes

Other information
- Station code: 8500121 (CFV)
- Fare zone: 11 (Vagabond)

Passengers
- 2023: 480 per weekday (SBB)

Services
Preceding station	RER Jura	Following station
Bassecourt towards Delle	R1	Courtételle towards Delémont
Bassecourt towards Bonfol	R2	Courtételle towards Delémont
Location
- Location within Switzerland Location within Canton of Jura

Courfaivre railway station (French: Gare de Courfaivre) is a railway station in the former municipality of Courfaivre, now part of Haute-Sorne, in the Swiss canton of Jura. It is an intermediate stop on the standard gauge Delémont–Delle line of Swiss Federal Railways.

== Services ==
As of the December 2025 timetable change, the following services stop at Courfaivre:

- RER Jura: half-hourly service between Delémont and Porrentruy and hourly service to Delle and Bonfol.
