= St-Ursanne railway station =

Railway station in Clos du Doubs, Switzerland

St-Ursanne
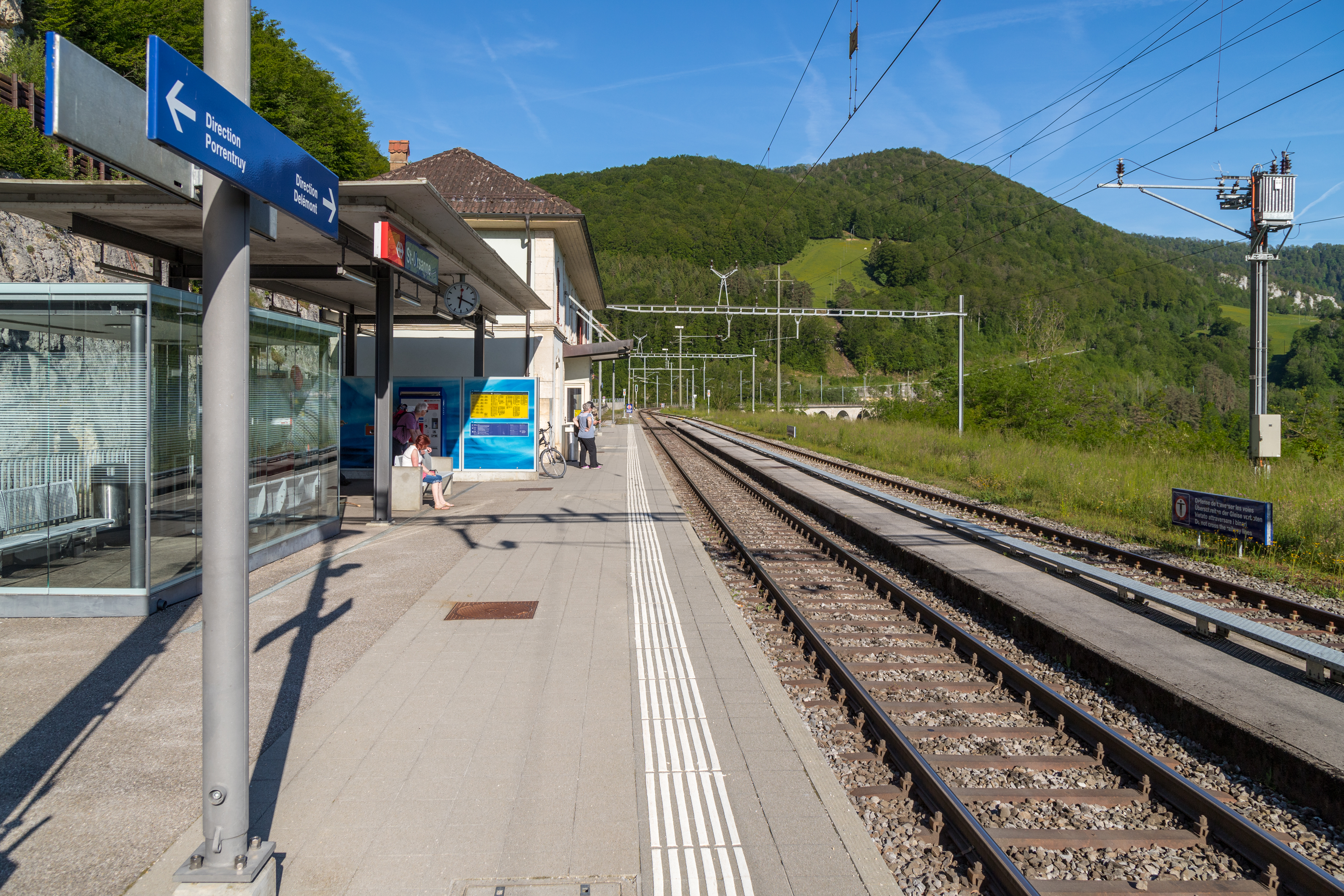
- The station building in 2019

General information
- Location: Clos du Doubs; Switzerland
- Coordinates: 47°22′04″N 7°09′57″E
- Elevation: 492 m (1,614 ft)
- Owner: Swiss Federal Railways
- Line: Delémont–Delle line
- Distance: 101.7 km (63.2 mi) from Olten
- Platforms: 1: 1 side platform; 1 island platform
- Tracks: 2
- Train operators: Swiss Federal Railways
- Connections: CarPostal SA buses

Construction
- Parking: Yes (25 spaces)
- Cycle facilities: Yes (9 spaces)
- Accessible: Yes

Other information
- Station code: 8500124 (SU)
- Fare zone: 30 (Vagabond)

Passengers
- 2023: 430 per weekday (SBB)

Services
Preceding station	RER Jura	Following station
Courgenay towards Delle	R1	Glovelier towards Delémont
Courgenay towards Bonfol	R2	Glovelier towards Delémont
Location
- Location within Switzerland Location within Canton of Jura

St-Ursanne railway station (French: Gare de St-Ursanne) is a railway station in the former municipality of Saint-Ursanne, now part of Clos du Doubs, in the Swiss canton of Jura. It is an intermediate stop on the standard gauge Delémont–Delle line of Swiss Federal Railways.

== Services ==
As of the December 2025 timetable change, the following services stop at St-Ursanne:

- RER Jura: half-hourly service between Delémont and Porrentruy and hourly service to Delle and Bonfol.
