= Courtételle railway station =

Railway station in Courtételle, Switzerland

Courtételle
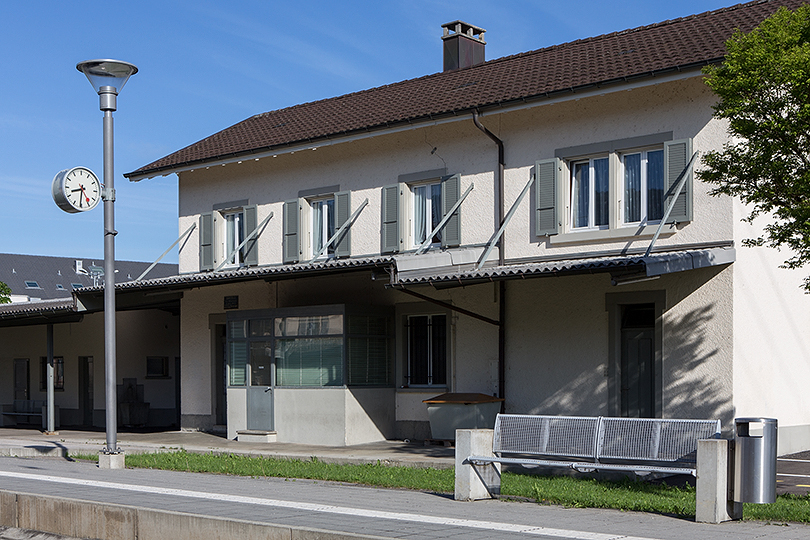
- The station building in 2016

General information
- Location: Courtételle; Switzerland
- Coordinates: 47°20′34″N 7°19′05″E
- Elevation: 437 m (1,434 ft)
- Owner: Swiss Federal Railways
- Line: Delémont–Delle line
- Distance: 87.9 km (54.6 mi) from Olten
- Platforms: 1 side platform
- Tracks: 1
- Train operators: Swiss Federal Railways
- Connections: CarPostal SA bus line

Construction
- Parking: Yes (26 spaces)
- Cycle facilities: Yes (18 spaces)
- Accessible: No

Other information
- Station code: 8500120 (CTT)
- Fare zone: 10 (Vagabond)

Passengers
- 2023: 970 per weekday (SBB)

Services
Preceding station	RER Jura	Following station
Courfaivre towards Delle	R1	Delémont Terminus
Courfaivre towards Bonfol	R2	Delémont Terminus
Location
- Location within Switzerland Location within Canton of Jura

Courtételle railway station (French: Gare de Courtételle) is a railway station in the municipality of Courtételle, in the Swiss canton of Jura. It is an intermediate stop on the standard gauge Delémont–Delle line of Swiss Federal Railways.

== Services ==
As of the December 2025 timetable change, the following services stop at Courtételle:

- RER Jura: half-hourly service between Delémont and Porrentruy and hourly service to Delle and Bonfol.
