= Courgenay railway station =

Railway station in Courgenay, Switzerland

Courgenay
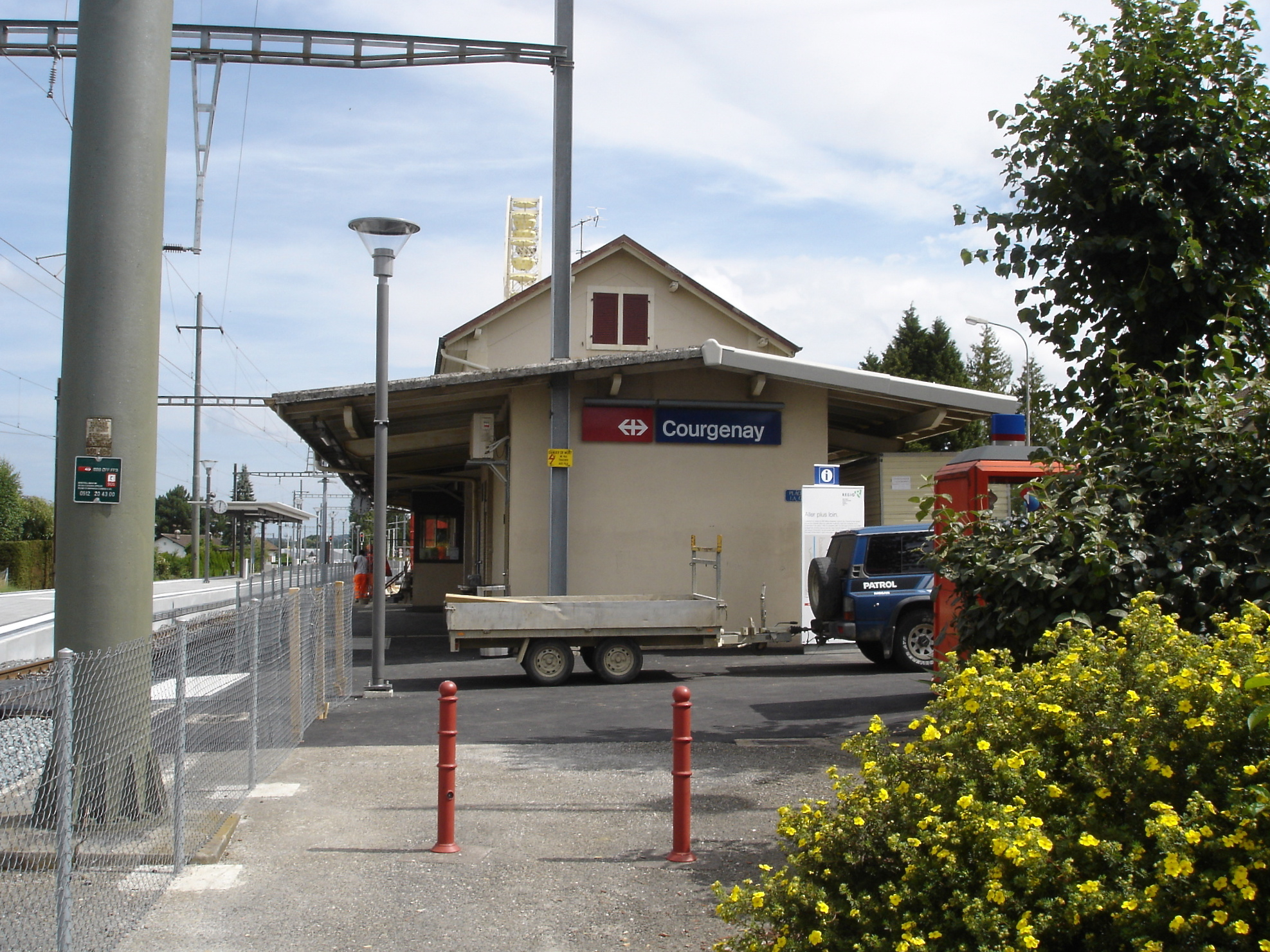
- The station building in 2008

General information
- Location: Courgenay; Switzerland
- Coordinates: 47°24′19″N 7°07′27″E
- Elevation: 488 m (1,601 ft)
- Owner: Swiss Federal Railways
- Line: Delémont–Delle line
- Distance: 107.8 km (67.0 mi) from Olten
- Platforms: 2 (1 island platform)
- Tracks: 2
- Train operators: Swiss Federal Railways
- Connections: CarPostal SA buses

Construction
- Parking: Yes (42 spaces)
- Cycle facilities: Yes (51 spaces)
- Accessible: Yes

Other information
- Station code: 8500125 (CG)
- Fare zone: 20 (Vagabond)

Passengers
- 2023: 830 per weekday (SBB)

Services
Preceding station	RER Jura	Following station
Porrentruy towards Delle	R1	St-Ursanne towards Delémont
Porrentruy towards Bonfol	R2	St-Ursanne towards Delémont
Location
- Location within Switzerland Location within Canton of Jura

Courgenay railway station (French: Gare de Courgenay) is a railway station in the municipality of Courgenay, in the Swiss canton of Jura. It is an intermediate stop on the standard gauge Delémont–Delle line of Swiss Federal Railways.

== Services ==
As of the December 2025 timetable change, the following services stop at Courgenay:

- RER Jura: half-hourly service between Porrentruy and Delémont and hourly service to Delle and Bonfol.
