= Glovelier railway station =

Railway station in Haute-Sorne, Switzerland

Glovelier
- The station building in 2018

General information
- Location: Haute-Sorne; Switzerland
- Coordinates: 47°20′07″N 7°12′33″E
- Elevation: 504 m (1,654 ft)
- Owner: Swiss Federal Railways
- Lines: Delémont–Delle line; La Chaux-de-Fonds–Glovelier line
- Distance: 96.4 km (59.9 mi) from Olten; 30.3 km (18.8 mi) from Le Noirmont
- Platforms: 3 (2 island platforms)
- Tracks: 4
- Train operators: Chemins de fer du Jura; Swiss Federal Railways
- Connections: CarPostal SA bus lines

Construction
- Parking: Yes (8 spaces)
- Cycle facilities: Yes (25 spaces)
- Accessible: Yes

Other information
- Station code: 8500123 (GLO)
- Fare zone: 11 and 40 (Vagabond)

Passengers
- 2023: 1'100 per weekday (SBB (excludes CJ))

Services
Preceding station	RER Jura	Following station
St-Ursanne towards Delle	R1	Bassecourt towards Delémont
St-Ursanne towards Bonfol	R2	Bassecourt towards Delémont
Preceding station	Chemins de fer du Jura	Following station
Combe-Tabeillon towards La Chaux-de-Fonds	R36	Terminus
Location
- Location within Switzerland Location within Canton of Jura

Glovelier railway station (French: Gare de Glovelier) is a railway station in the former municipality of Glovelier, now part of Haute-Sorne, in the Swiss canton of Jura. It is an intermediate stop on the standard gauge Delémont–Delle line of Swiss Federal Railways and the eastern terminus of the 1,000 mm (3 ft 3 3/8 in) gauge La Chaux-de-Fonds–Glovelier line of Chemins de fer du Jura.

== Services ==
As of the December 2025 timetable change, the following services stop at Glovelier:

- RER Jura: half-hourly service between Delémont and Porrentruy and hourly service to Delle and Bonfol.
- Regio: hourly service to La Chaux-de-Fonds.

== Gallery ==
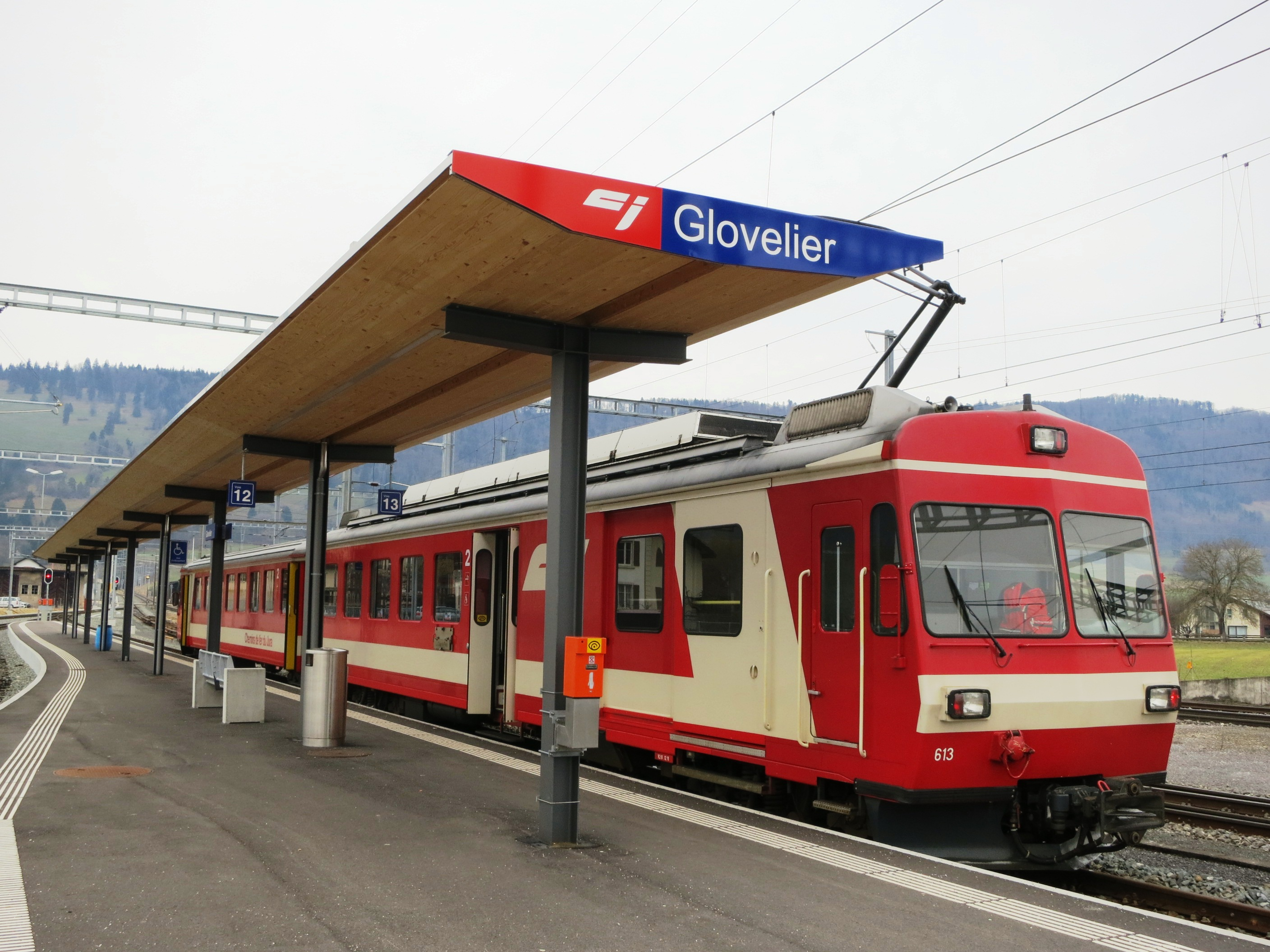
CJ (Chemins de fer du Jura) station
