= Vendlincourt railway station =

Railway station in Vendlincourt, Switzerland

Vendlincourt
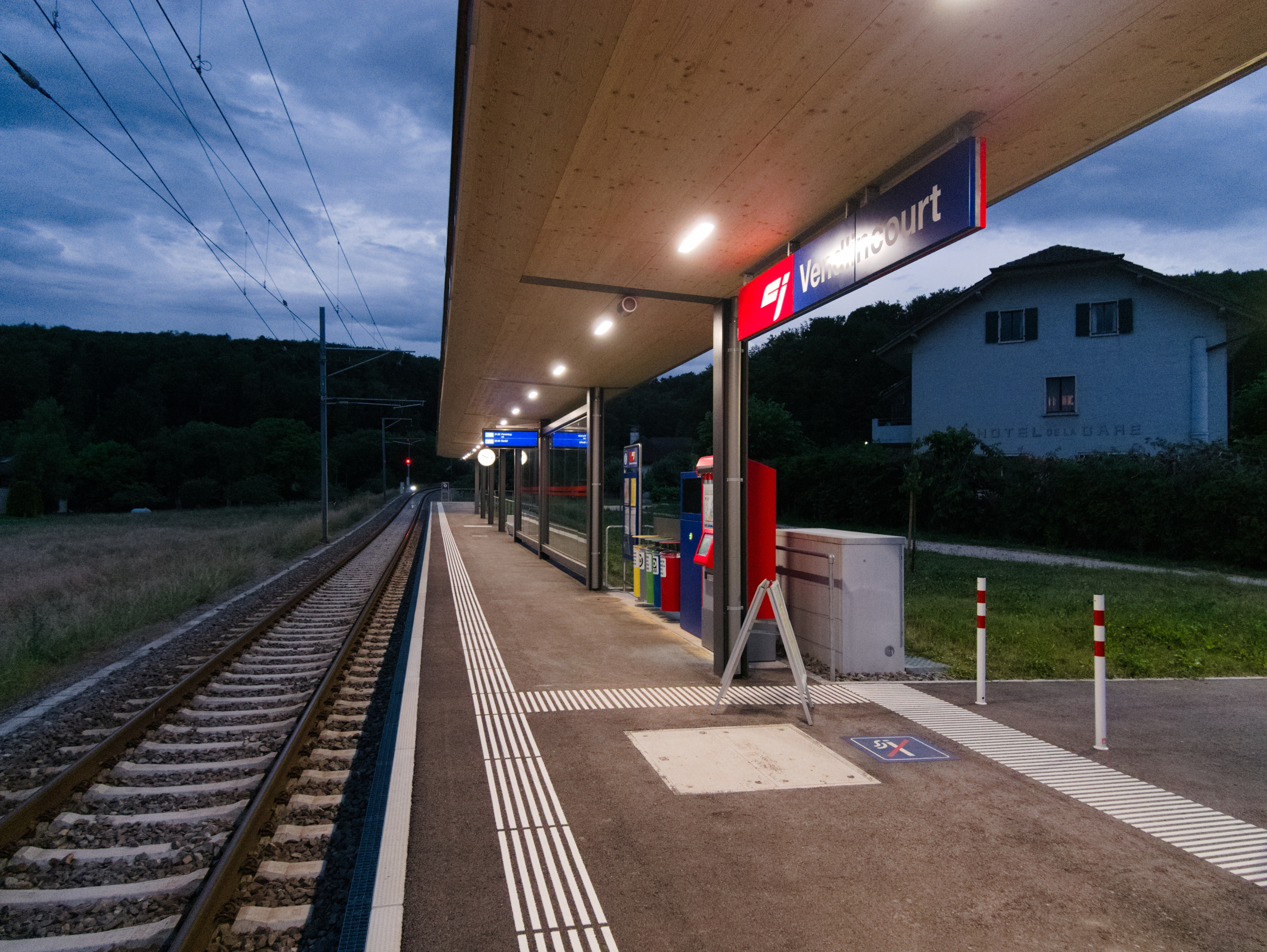
- The new station platform in 2022

General information
- Location: Vendlincourt, Jura; Switzerland
- Coordinates: 47°27′08″N 7°09′25″E
- Elevation: 448 m (1,470 ft)
- Owner: Chemins de fer du Jura
- Line: Porrentruy–Bonfol
- Distance: 8.4 km (5.2 mi) from Porrentruy
- Platforms: 1 side platform
- Tracks: 1
- Train operators: Swiss Federal Railways

Construction
- Accessible: Yes

Other information
- Station code: 8500187 (VEND)
- Fare zone: 23 (Vagabond)

Services
Preceding station	RER Jura	Following station
Bonfol Terminus	R2	Alle towards Delémont
Bonfol Terminus	R22	Alle towards Porrentruy
Location
- Location within Switzerland Location within Canton of Jura

Vendlincourt railway station (French: Gare de Vendlincourt) is a railway station in the municipality of Vendlincourt, in the Swiss canton of Jura. It is located on the standard gauge Porrentruy–Bonfol railway line of Chemins de fer du Jura.

== History ==
The station was renovated in 2020, including the construction of new 100 m (330 ft) platform with better accessibility for disabled passengers.

== Services ==
As of the December 2025 timetable change, the following services stop at Vendlincourt:

- RER Jura: half-hourly service between Porrentruy and Bonfol and hourly service to Delémont.
