= Alle railway station =

Railway station in Alle, Switzerland

Alle
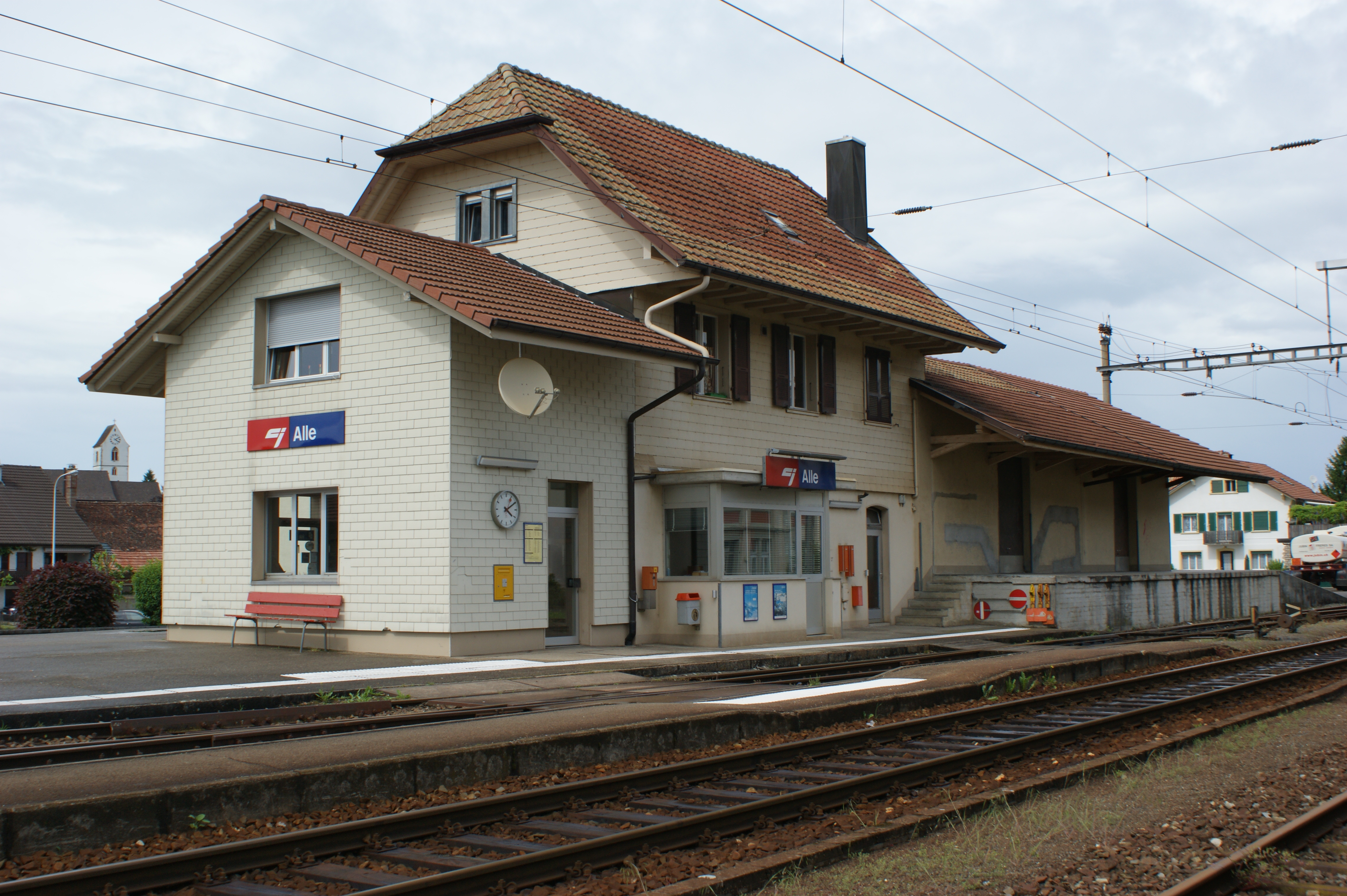
- The station in 2008, prior to renovation

General information
- Location: Alle, Jura; Switzerland
- Coordinates: 47°25′27″N 7°07′42″E
- Elevation: 450 m (1,480 ft)
- Owner: Chemins de fer du Jura
- Line: Porrentruy–Bonfol
- Distance: 4.2 km (2.6 mi) from Porrentruy
- Platforms: 1 side platform
- Tracks: 1
- Train operators: Swiss Federal Railways
- Connections: CarPostal SA bus line

Construction
- Accessible: Yes (from October 2024)

Other information
- Station code: 8500186 (ALLE)
- Fare zone: 20 (Vagabond)

Services
Preceding station	RER Jura	Following station
Vendlincourt towards Bonfol	R2	Porrentruy towards Delémont
Vendlincourt towards Bonfol	R22	Porrentruy Terminus
Location
- Location within Switzerland Location within Canton of Jura

Alle railway station (French: Gare d'Alle) is a railway station in the municipality of Alle, in the Swiss canton of Jura. It is located on the standard gauge Porrentruy–Bonfol railway line of Chemins de fer du Jura.

== History ==
The station was renovated in 2020 to add more freight tracks and expand the adjacent goods station.

== Services ==
As of the December 2025 timetable change, the following services stop at Alle:

- RER Jura: half-hourly service between Porrentruy and Bonfol and hourly service to Delémont.
