= Courtételle =

- Municipality
- Coat of arms
- Location of Courtételle
- Location within Switzerland Location within Canton of Jura
- Coordinates: 47°21′N 7°19′E
- Country: Switzerland
- Canton: Jura
- District: Delémont

Government
  - Executive: Conseil communal with 7 members
  - Mayor: Maire; Sébastien Koller Centre (as of 2026)

Area
  - Total: 13.56 km^{2} (5.24 sq mi)
- Elevation: 441 m (1,447 ft)

Population (June 2006)
  - Total: 2,249
  - Density: 165.9/km^{2} (429.6/sq mi)
- Time zone: UTC+01:00 (CET)
  - Summer (DST): UTC+02:00 (CEST)
- Postal code: 2852
- SFOS number: 6710
- ISO 3166 code: CH-JU
- Surrounded by: Châtillon, Courfaivre, Delémont, Develier, Soulce
- Website: www.courtetelle.ch

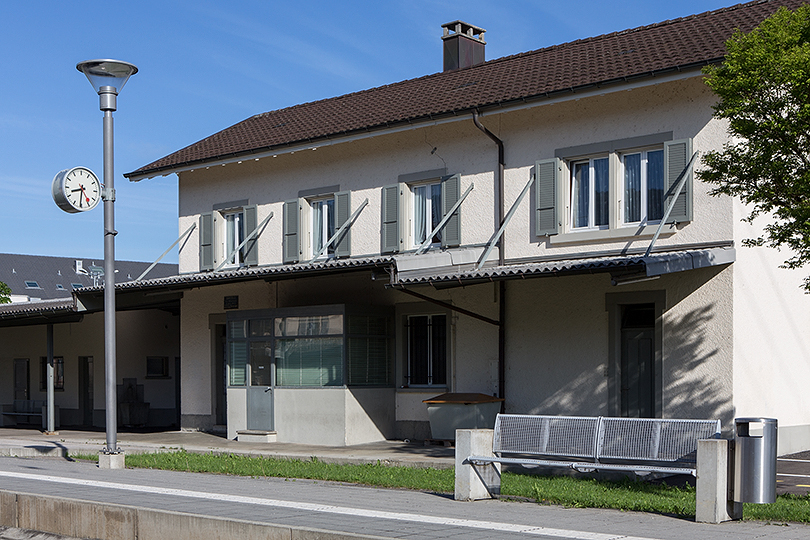
Train station.

Courtételle (French pronunciation: [kuʁtetɛl]; Frainc-Comtou: Cortétélle) is a municipality in the district of Delémont in the canton of Jura in Switzerland.

== History ==
Courtételle is first mentioned in 1178 as Curtetele.

== Geography ==
Aerial view (1955)

Courtételle has an area of 13.56 km^{2} (5.24 sq mi). Of this area, 7.55 km^{2} (2.92 mi^{2}) or 55.6% is used for agricultural purposes, while 4.87 km^{2} (1.88 mi^{2}) or 35.9% is forested. Of the rest of the land, 1.11 km^{2} (0.43 mi^{2}) or 8.2% is settled (buildings or roads), 0.04 km^{2} (9.9 acres) or 0.3% is either rivers or lakes and 0.01 km^{2} (2.5 acres) or 0.1% is unproductive land.

Of the built up area, housing and buildings made up 4.2% and transportation infrastructure made up 2.3%. Out of the forested land, 32.9% of the total land area is heavily forested and 3.0% is covered with orchards or small clusters of trees. Of the agricultural land, 31.8% is used for growing crops and 14.4% is pastures and 8.5% is used for alpine pastures. All the water in the municipality is flowing water.

The municipality is located in the Delémont district, above Delémont on the right bank of the Sorne river. It consists of the village of Courtételle and a number of scattered hamlets and farm houses.

== Coat of arms ==
The blazon of the municipal coat of arms is Gules, Coupeaux of Six Vert bordered Or.

== Demographics ==
Courtételle has a population (as of December 2020) of 2,644. As of 2008, 13.0% of the population are resident foreign nationals. Over the last 10 years (2000–2010) the population has changed at a rate of 7%. Migration accounted for 1.2%, while births and deaths accounted for 3.9%.

Most of the population (as of 2000) speaks French (1,999 or 91.7%) as their first language, Italian is the second most common (57 or 2.6%) and German is the third (46 or 2.1%).

As of 2008, the population was 49.3% male and 50.7% female. The population was made up of 995 Swiss men (42.3% of the population) and 164 (7.0%) non-Swiss men. There were 1,052 Swiss women (44.7%) and 142 (6.0%) non-Swiss women. Of the population in the municipality, 859 or about 39.4% were born in Courtételle and lived there in 2000. There were 748 or 34.3% who were born in the same canton, while 264 or 12.1% were born somewhere else in Switzerland, and 272 or 12.5% were born outside of Switzerland.

As of 2000, children and teenagers (0–19 years old) make up 26.8% of the population, while adults (20–64 years old) make up 60.1% and seniors (over 64 years old) make up 13%.

As of 2000, there were 924 people who were single and never married in the municipality. There were 1,049 married individuals, 111 widows or widowers and 96 individuals who are divorced.

As of 2000, there were 859 private households in the municipality, and an average of 2.5 persons per household. There were 238 households that consist of only one person and 73 households with five or more people. In 2000, a total of 845 apartments (92.8% of the total) were permanently occupied, while 37 apartments (4.1%) were seasonally occupied and 29 apartments (3.2%) were empty. As of 2009, the construction rate of new housing units was 0.4 new units per 1000 residents. The vacancy rate for the municipality, in 2010, was 1.08%.

The historical population is given in the following chart:

== Politics ==
In the 2007 federal election the most popular party was the SPS which received 43.76% of the vote. The next three most popular parties were the CVP (22.56%), the SVP (13.05%) and the CSP (10.39%). In the federal election, a total of 634 votes were cast, and the voter turnout was 40.8%.

== Economy ==
As of 2010, Courtételle had an unemployment rate of 5.8%. As of 2008, there were 46 people employed in the primary economic sector and about 20 businesses involved in this sector. 339 people were employed in the secondary sector and there were 26 businesses in this sector. 287 people were employed in the tertiary sector, with 55 businesses in this sector. There were 1,059 residents of the municipality who were employed in some capacity, of which females made up 40.3% of the workforce.

In 2008 the total number of full-time equivalent jobs was 582. The number of jobs in the primary sector was 33, of which 30 were in agriculture and 3 were in forestry or lumber production. The number of jobs in the secondary sector was 329 of which 262 or (79.6%) were in manufacturing and 67 (20.4%) were in construction. The number of jobs in the tertiary sector was 220. In the tertiary sector; 64 or 29.1% were in wholesale or retail sales or the repair of motor vehicles, 10 or 4.5% were in the movement and storage of goods, 12 or 5.5% were in a hotel or restaurant, 2 or 0.9% were in the information industry, 6 or 2.7% were the insurance or financial industry, 6 or 2.7% were technical professionals or scientists, 65 or 29.5% were in education and 18 or 8.2% were in health care.

In 2000, there were 440 workers who commuted into the municipality and 733 workers who commuted away. The municipality is a net exporter of workers, with about 1.7 workers leaving the municipality for every one entering. About 12.3% of the workforce coming into Courtételle are coming from outside Switzerland. Of the working population, 11.3% used public transportation to get to work, and 66.1% used a private car.

== Religion ==
From the 2000 census, 1,736 or 79.6% were Roman Catholic, while 188 or 8.6% belonged to the Swiss Reformed Church. Of the rest of the population, there was 1 member of an Orthodox church, and there were 63 individuals (or about 2.89% of the population) who belonged to another Christian church. There were 52 (or about 2.39% of the population) who were Islamic. There was 1 person who was Buddhist and 4 individuals who belonged to another church. 110 (or about 5.05% of the population) belonged to no church, are agnostic or atheist, and 56 individuals (or about 2.57% of the population) did not answer the question.

== Transport ==
Courtételle sits on the Delémont–Delle line and is served by trains at Courtételle railway station.

== Education ==
In Courtételle about 818 or (37.5%) of the population have completed non-mandatory upper secondary education, and 166 or (7.6%) have completed additional higher education (either university or a Fachhochschule). Of the 166 who completed tertiary schooling, 65.1% were Swiss men, 21.7% were Swiss women, 10.2% were non-Swiss men and 3.0% were non-Swiss women.

The Canton of Jura school system provides two year of non-obligatory Kindergarten, followed by six years of Primary school. This is followed by three years of obligatory lower Secondary school where the students are separated according to ability and aptitude. Following the lower Secondary students may attend a three or four year optional upper Secondary school followed by some form of Tertiary school or they may enter an apprenticeship.

During the 2009-10 school year, there were no students attending school in Courtételle. As of 2000, there were 28 students in Courtételle who came from another municipality, while 150 residents attended schools outside the municipality.
