= Porrentruy–Bonfol railway line =

Railway line in Switzerland

Porrentruy–Bonfol
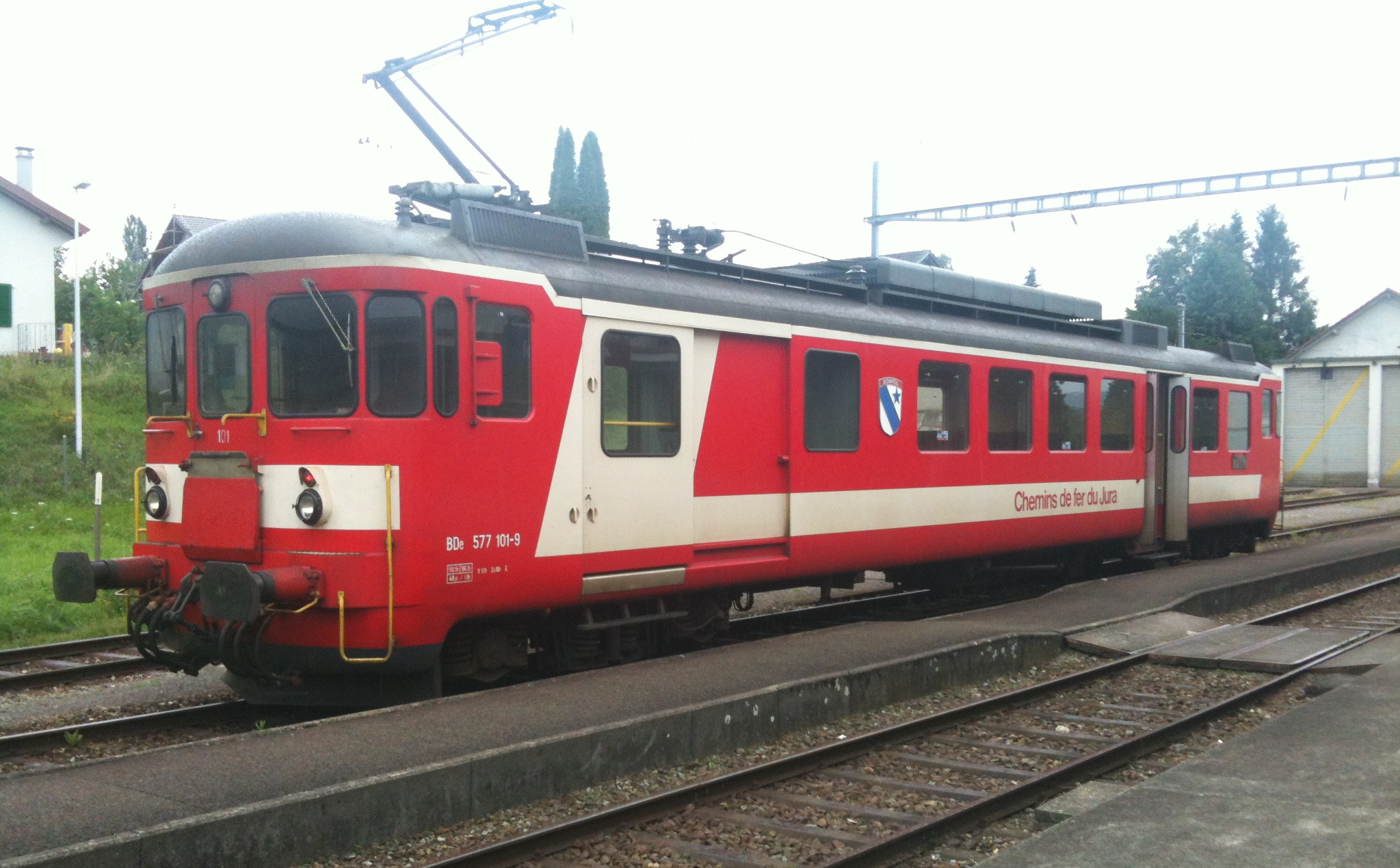
- Chemins de fer du Jura train at Bonfol in 2012

Overview
- Owner: Chemins de fer du Jura
- Line number: 238
- Termini: Porrentruy; Bonfol
- Stations: 4

Service
- Operator(s): Swiss Federal Railways

History
- Opened: 14 July 1901

Technical
- Line length: 10.9 km (6.8 mi)
- Track gauge: 1,435 mm (4 ft 8 1/2 in) standard gauge
- Electrification: 15 kV/16.7 Hz AC overhead catenary

The Porrentruy–Bonfol railway line is a standard gauge railway line in the canton of Jura, Switzerland. It runs 10.9 kilometres (6.8 mi) from a junction with the Delémont–Delle railway line at Porrentruy northeast to Bonfol. Chemins de fer du Jura owns the line while Swiss Federal Railways operates services on it. The line formerly extended to the French border at Pfetterhouse.

== History ==
The Régional Porrentruy–Bonfol (RPB) opened the line between Porrentruy and Bonfol on 14 July 1901. On 1 November 1910, the line was extended 2.5 kilometres (1.6 mi) to what was then the German border near Pfetterhouse and a junction with the Dannemarie–Pfetterhouse railway line.

The RPB was one of four companies that merged on 1 January 1944 to form the Chemins de fer du Jura, which has owned and operated the line ever since. Cross-border passenger service north of Bonfol ended on 14 February 1946; the line north of Bonfol was abandoned altogether on 4 January 1970. The line from Porrentruy to Bonfol was electrified on 18 May 1952.

Chemins de fer du Jura undertook a rehabilitation of the line between 2020 and 2022, including new platforms at all three stations and a rebuilding of the bridge over the Allaine. With the December 2025 timetable change, Swiss Federal Railways took over passenger services as part of the RER Jura network.

== Service ==
As of the December 2021 timetable change, Chemins de fer du Jura operates hourly passenger service over the route, with additional trains during peak-hours on weekdays. Trains are scheduled to connect with further services to and from Delémont and Glovelier.

As of the December 2025 timetable change, Swiss Federal Railways will operate half-hourly service over the route, with through service to Delémont.
