= Delle =

- Commune
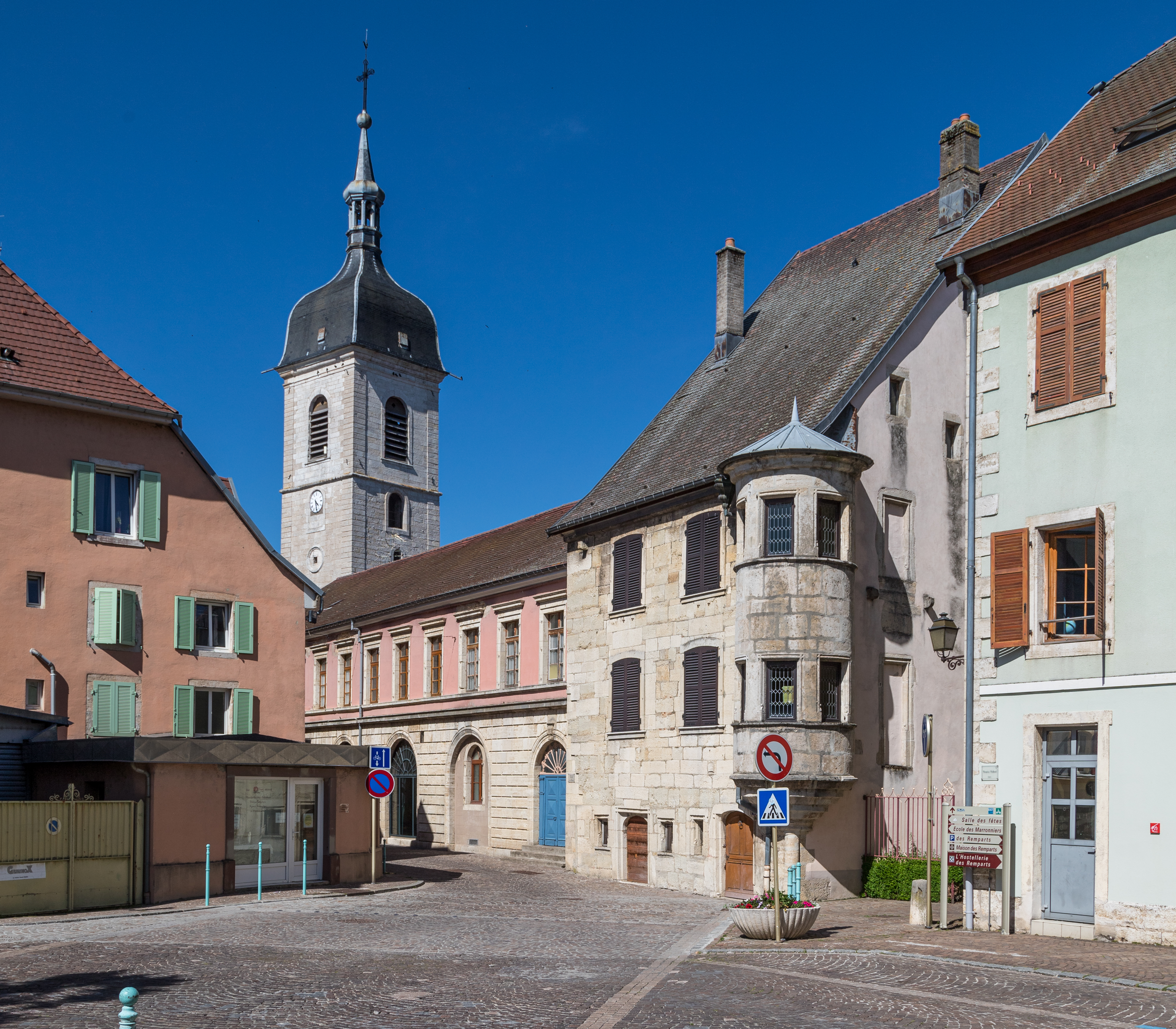
- The town centre

- Coat of arms
- Location of Delle
- Location within France Location within Bourgogne-Franche-Comté
- Coordinates: 47°31′N 7°00′E
- Country: France
- Region: Bourgogne-Franche-Comté
- Department: Territoire de Belfort
- Arrondissement: Belfort
- Canton: Delle
- Intercommunality: Sud Territoire

Government
  - Mayor (2026–32): Sandrine Janiaud Larcher
- Area^{1}: 9.20 km^{2} (3.55 sq mi)
- Highest elevation: 443 m (1,453 ft)
- Lowest elevation: 353 m (1,158 ft)
- Population (2023): 5,623
  - Density: 611/km^{2} (1,580/sq mi)
- Demonym: Dellois
- Time zone: UTC+01:00 (CET)
  - Summer (DST): UTC+02:00 (CEST)
- INSEE/Postal code: 90033 /90100
- Website: delle.fr
- ^{1} French Land Register data, which excludes lakes, ponds, glaciers > 1 km^{2} (0.386 sq mi or 247 acres) and river estuaries.

Delle (French pronunciation: [dɛl]) is a commune on the Swiss border in the Territoire de Belfort department in the Bourgogne-Franche-Comté region in Northeastern France.

== Population ==
Historical population
Year	Pop.	±% p.a.
1968	6,134	—
1975	6,528	+0.89%
1982	6,898	+0.79%
1990	6,992	+0.17%
1999	6,624	−0.60%
2007	6,047	−1.13%
2012	5,864	−0.61%
2017	5,690	−0.60%
2023	5,623	−0.20%
Source: INSEE

== Politics ==
From 1991 to 2004, Raymond Forni served as Mayor of Delle. From 2000 to 2002, he was also President of the National Assembly as the deputy for Territoire de Belfort's 1st constituency.

== Transport ==
Delle is the last French town on the railway line from Belfort to Bern, in Switzerland. Delle station is served by trains to Belfort and Biel/Bienne.

== Gallery ==
Town centre of Delle
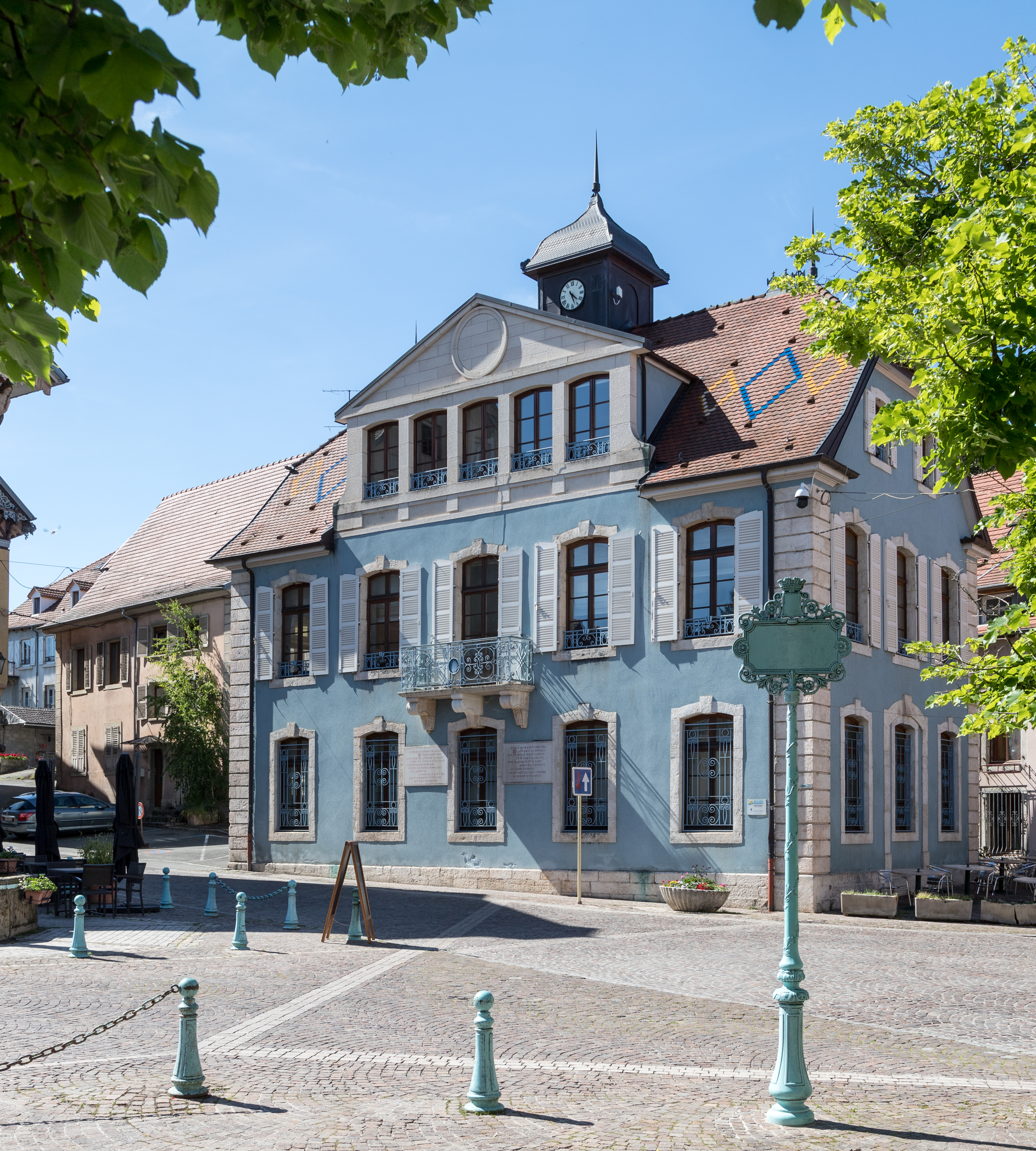

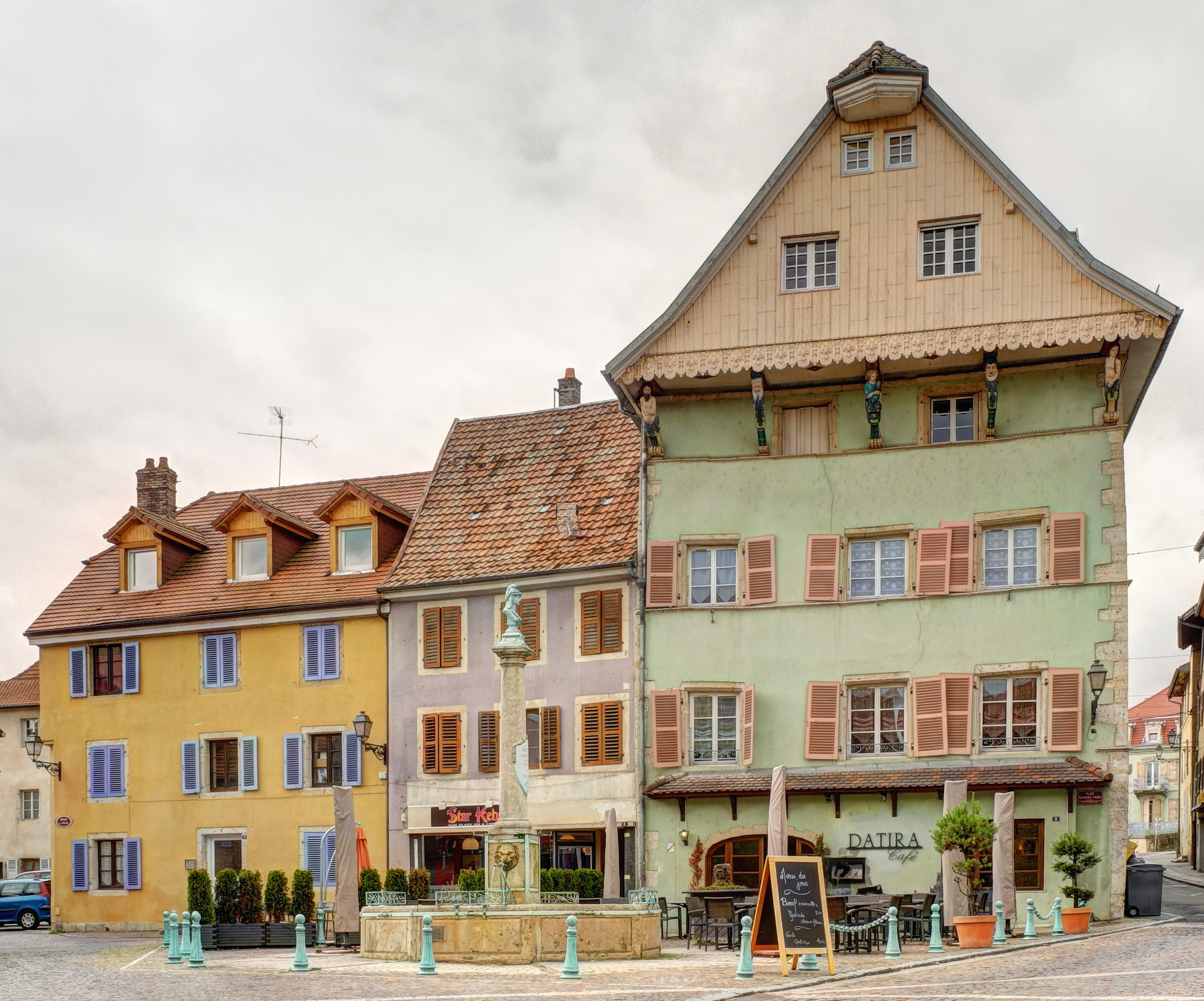

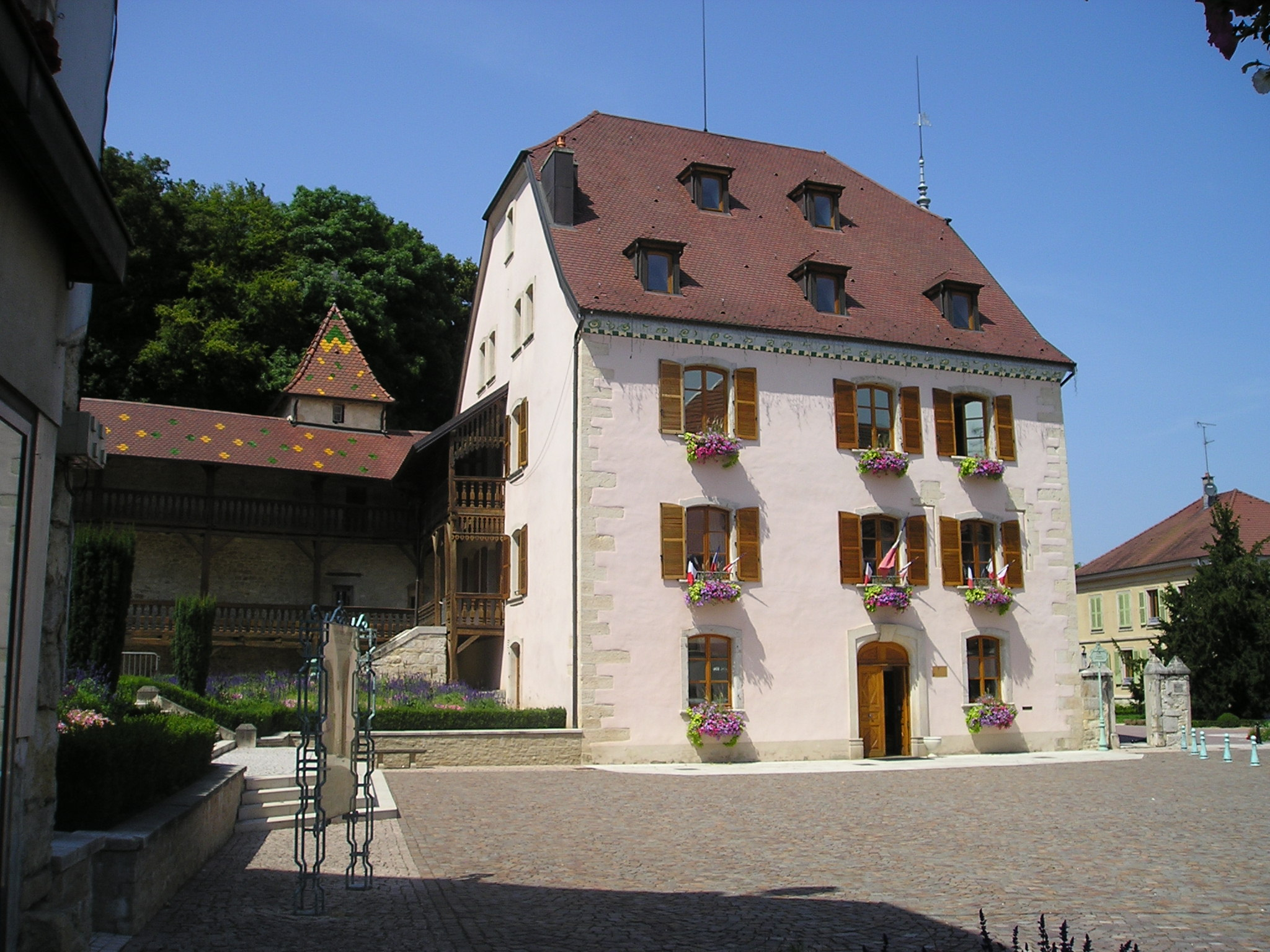

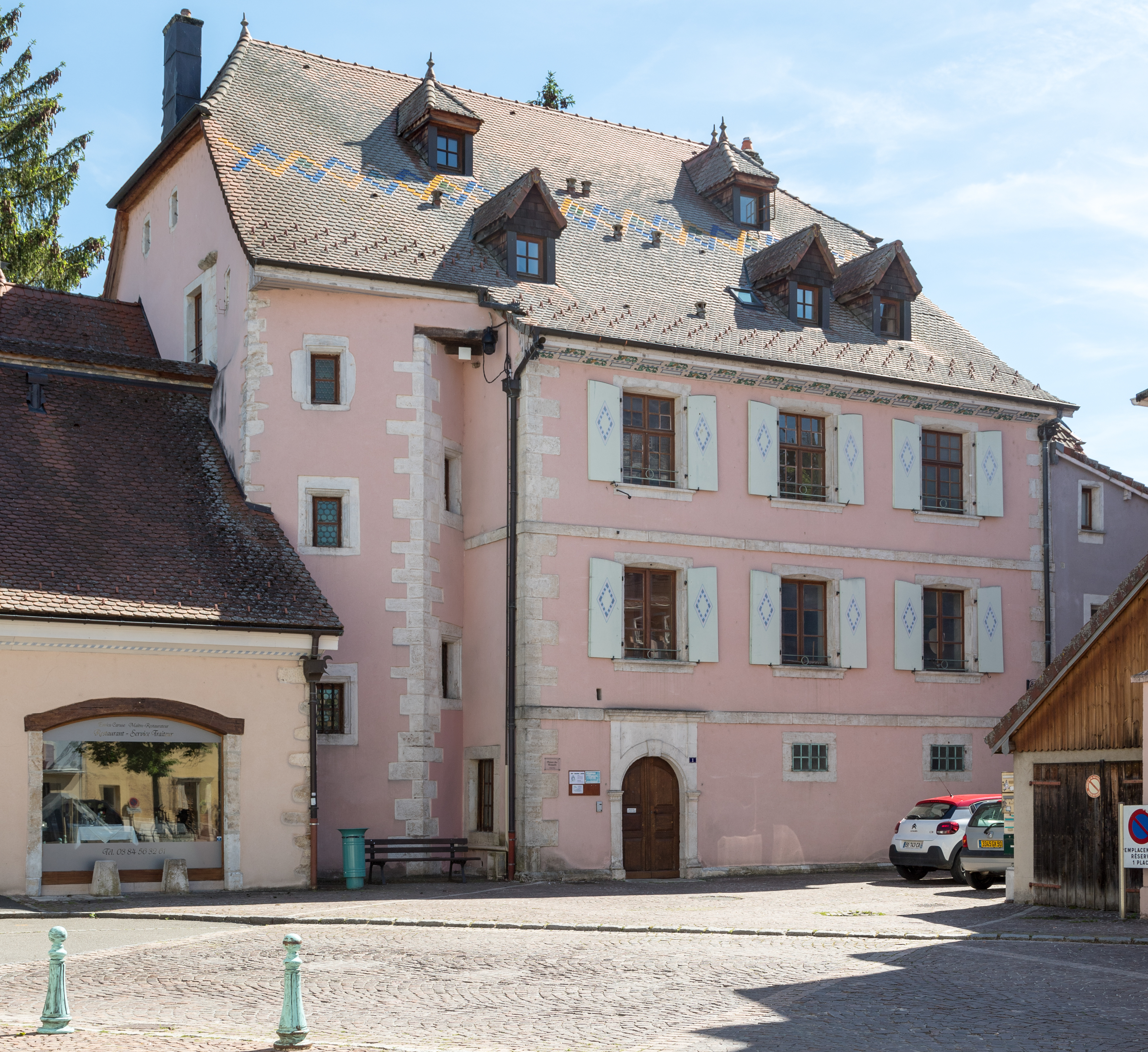

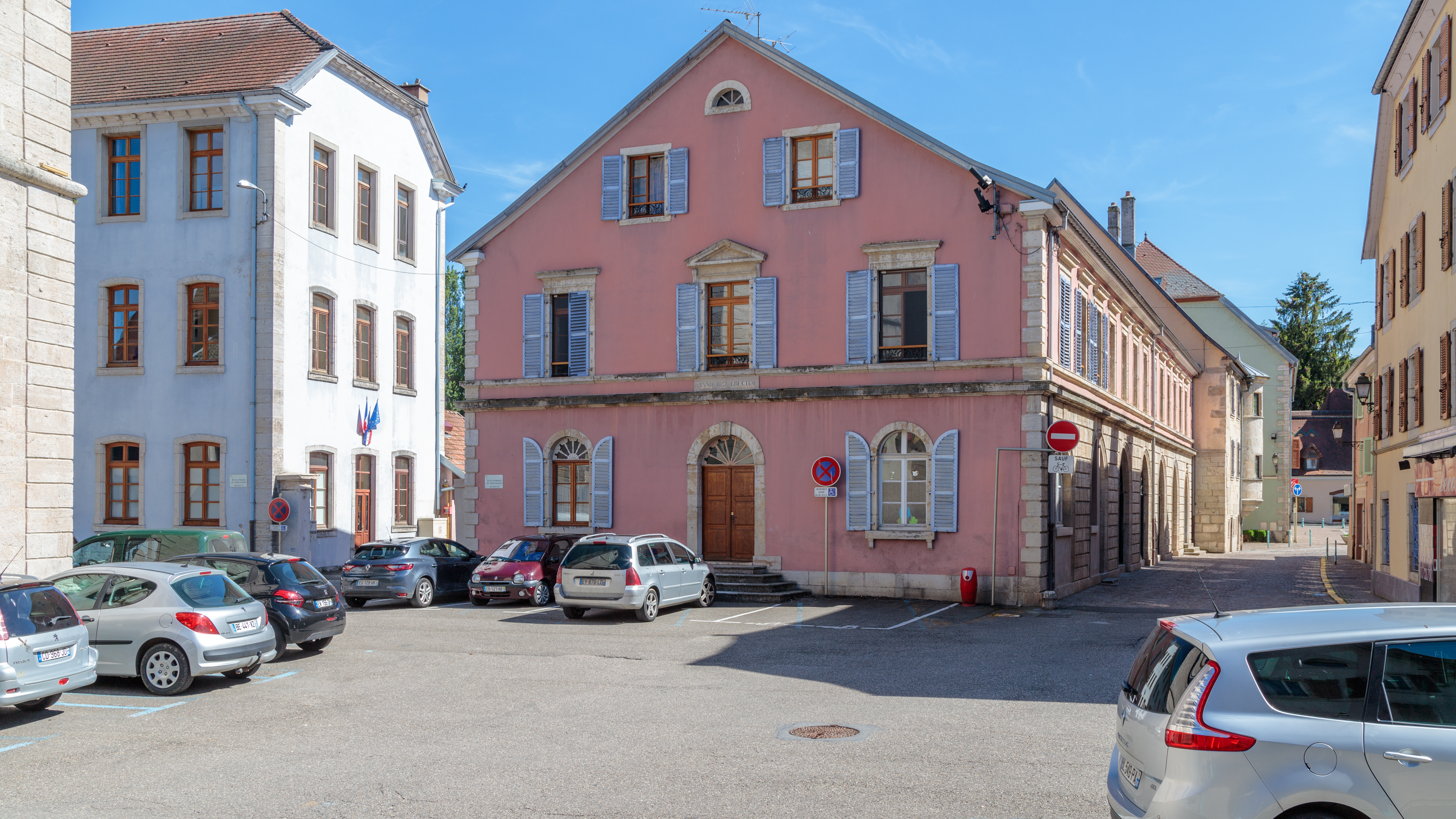

== See also ==
- Communes of the Territoire de Belfort department
