= Pfetterhouse =

Commune in Grand Est, France

Pfetterhouse Pfatterhüse
- Commune
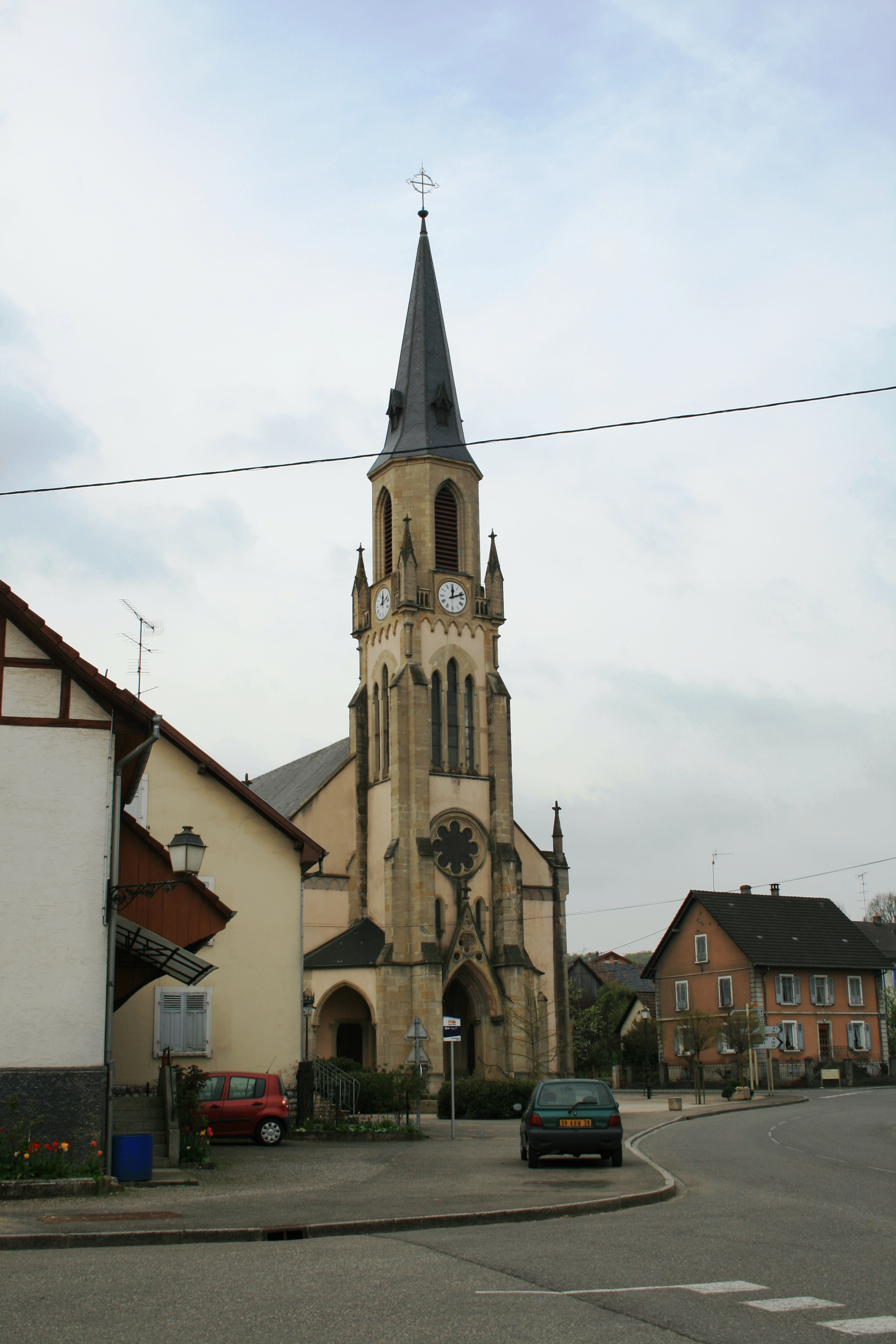
- St. Gereon's Church in Pfetterhouse

- Coat of arms
- Location of Pfetterhouse
- Location within France Location within Grand Est
- Coordinates: 47.5017°N 7.1672°E
- Country: France
- Region: Grand Est
- Department: Haut-Rhin
- Arrondissement: Altkirch
- Canton: Masevaux-Niederbruck

Government
  - Mayor (2020–2026): Jean-Rodolphe Frisch
- Area^{1}: 14.28 km^{2} (5.51 sq mi)
- Elevation: 481 m (1,578 ft)
- Highest elevation: 501 m (1,644 ft)
- Lowest elevation: 391 m (1,283 ft)
- Population (2023): 987
  - Density: 69.1/km^{2} (179/sq mi)
- Time zone: UTC+01:00 (CET)
  - Summer (DST): UTC+02:00 (CEST)
- INSEE/Postal code: 68257 /68480
- Website: www.pfetterhouse.net
- ^{1} French Land Register data, which excludes lakes, ponds, glaciers > 1 km^{2} (0.386 sq mi or 247 acres) and river estuaries.

Pfetterhouse (French pronunciation: [pfɛtəʁuz]; Alemannic German: Pfatterhüse; German: Pfetterhausen Frainc-Comtou: Prouse) is a commune in the Haut-Rhin department in Alsace in north-eastern France.

== Geography ==
Pfetterhouse is located in Jura Alsatian foothills, just in the border of Switzerland and the Territoire de Belfort.

== Origins of its name ==
The first mention of this village is dated from 732 AD and comes from Latin: Petrosa "the rocky one". An explanation of this origin could be the fact that stone from Pfetterhouse's quarry was used to build a Roman station not far from Petrosa or the presence of a Roman paved road. It explains the use of the French variant form Pérouse. The Alemannic form is already mentioned as Phetterhusen in a 1296 document. The spelling ph in Old High German notes pf in Modern German.

From the 17th century to 1919, the German Pfetterhausen (-hausen is an often-used suffix for German village names) was used instead, then in 1919 Pérouse (which sounds more French, because Alsace was taken back by France) and, in the end, Pfetterhouse, -house is a widespread spelling in Alsace (see Mulhouse) for the Alemannic -hüse and the German -hausen.

== History ==
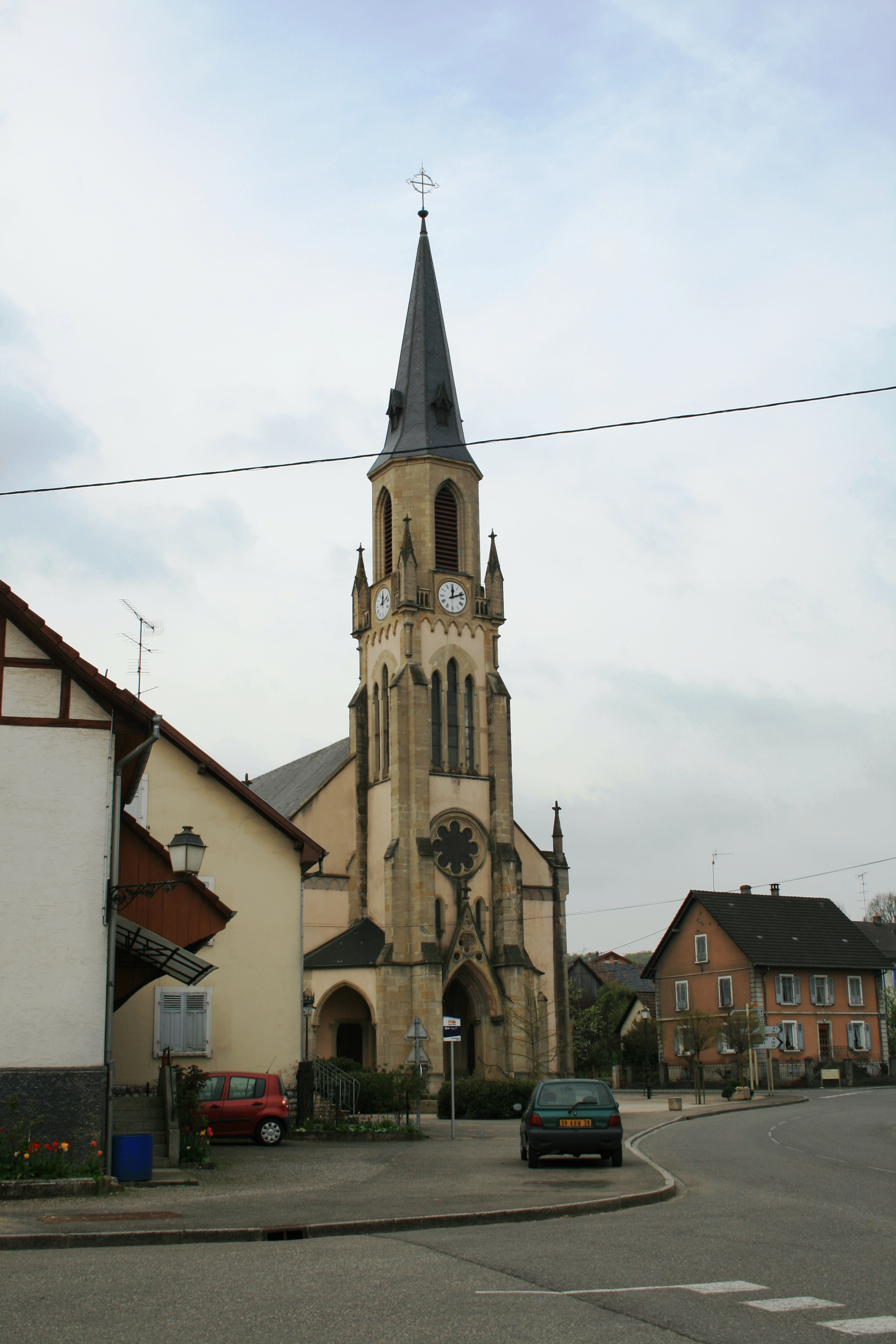
St. Gereon's Church, Pfetterhouse

The Borne des Trois Puissances (Three Powers Boundary Stone) is situated in Pfetterhouse area. Until 1919, this stone was the point where the borders of France, Germany and Switzerland met. This boundary marker gave to the village an international renown: many people from France, Germany or Switzerland came to have their photograph taken with it, which they could send to relatives as a postal card.

== 19th–20th centuries ==
After the annexation of Alsace by the German Empire in 1871, Pfetterhouse became known as Pfetterhausen. Germany imposed a high customs duty on wristwatches, so many Swiss watch- and clockmakers moved to Pfetterhausen to ply their trade and avoid the charges. From 1890 onwards, the town flourished and became prosperous, and almost everyone worked in some way for the watch-making industry, producing 300,000 watches a year. A large and imposing railway station was opened in 1910.

On the outbreak of World War I in August 1914, the area saw some of the earliest fighting, and many of the Swiss fled across the border into Switzerland. The opposing French and German forces settled into trenches on opposite sides of the River Largin (French: Largue) some 3 kilometres (1.9 mi) to the east of the village.

French troops occupied the village, and in February 1916 a week-long German bombardment caused considerable damage and led to a complete evacuation of civilians. Pfetterhouse remained an exclusively military base until the spring of 1919.

After the war, Alsace was returned to France. The local economy did not regain its pre-war status. By the 1960s, the passenger train service was withdrawn, and the line was closed completely by 1970.

== Demography ==
- 1962: 789
- 1968: 809
- 1975: 906
- 1982: 924
- 1990: 971
- 1999: 972
- 2006: 1050

== See also ==
- Communes of the Haut-Rhin department
