= Porrentruy railway station =

Railway station in Porrentruy, Switzerland

Porrentruy
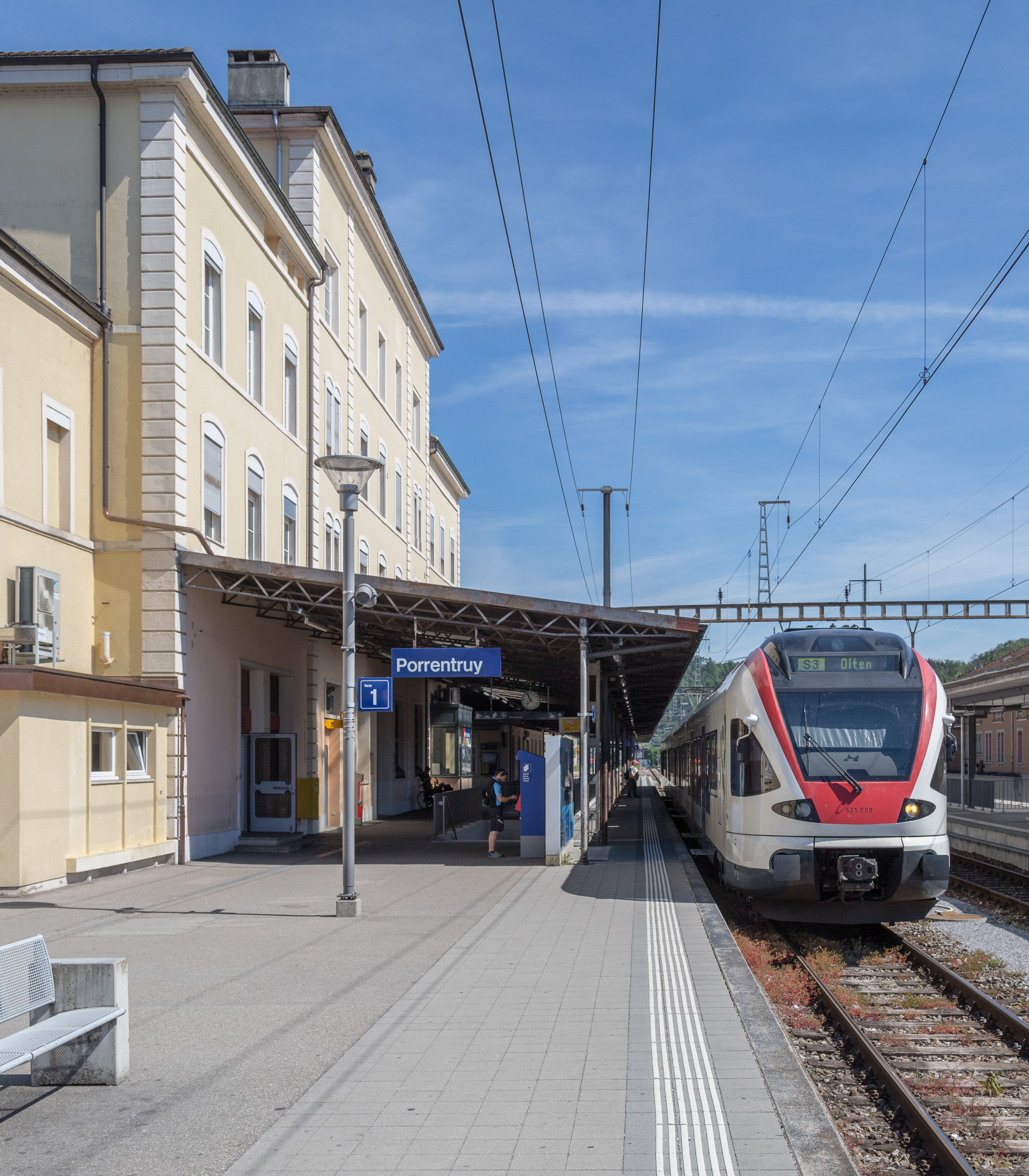
- The station building in 2019

General information
- Location: Porrentruy; Switzerland
- Coordinates: 47°25′15″N 7°04′48″E
- Owner: Swiss Federal Railways
- Lines: Delémont–Delle line; Porrentruy–Bonfol line
- Distance: 112.9 km (70.2 mi) from Olten
- Platforms: 3: 1 island platform; 1 side platform
- Tracks: 3
- Train operators: Swiss Federal Railways
- Connections: CarPostal SA buses

Construction
- Parking: Yes (43 spaces)
- Cycle facilities: Yes (32 spaces)
- Accessible: Yes

Other information
- Station code: 8500126 (POR)
- Fare zone: 20 (Vagabond)

Passengers
- 2023: 3'800 per weekday (SBB (excludes CJ))

Services
Preceding station	RER Jura	Following station
Courchavon towards Delle	R1	Courgenay towards Delémont
Courchavon towards Delle	R11	Terminus
Alle towards Bonfol	R2	Courgenay towards Delémont
Alle towards Bonfol	R22	Terminus
Location
- Location within Switzerland Location within Canton of Jura

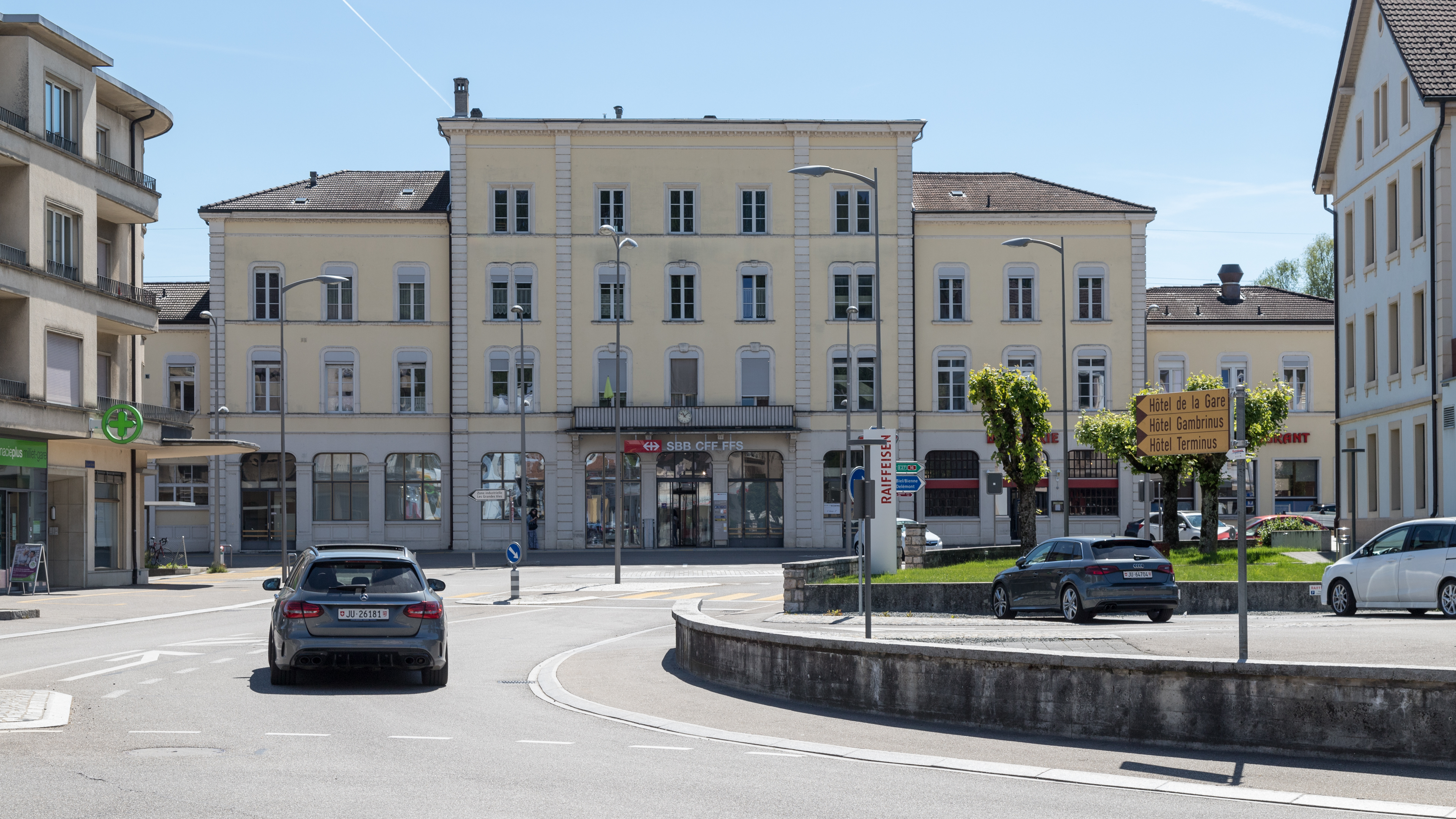
Porrentruy railway station

Porrentruy railway station (French: Gare de Porrentruy) is a railway station in the municipality of Porrentruy, in the Swiss canton of Jura. It is an intermediate stop on the standard gauge Delémont–Delle line of Swiss Federal Railways and the western terminus of the Porrentruy–Bonfol line of Chemins de fer du Jura.

== Services ==
As of the December 2025 timetable change, the following services stop at Porrentruy:

- RER Jura: half-hourly service to Delle, Bonfol, and Delémont.
