= Bonfol railway station =

Railway station in Bonfol, Switzerland

Bonfol
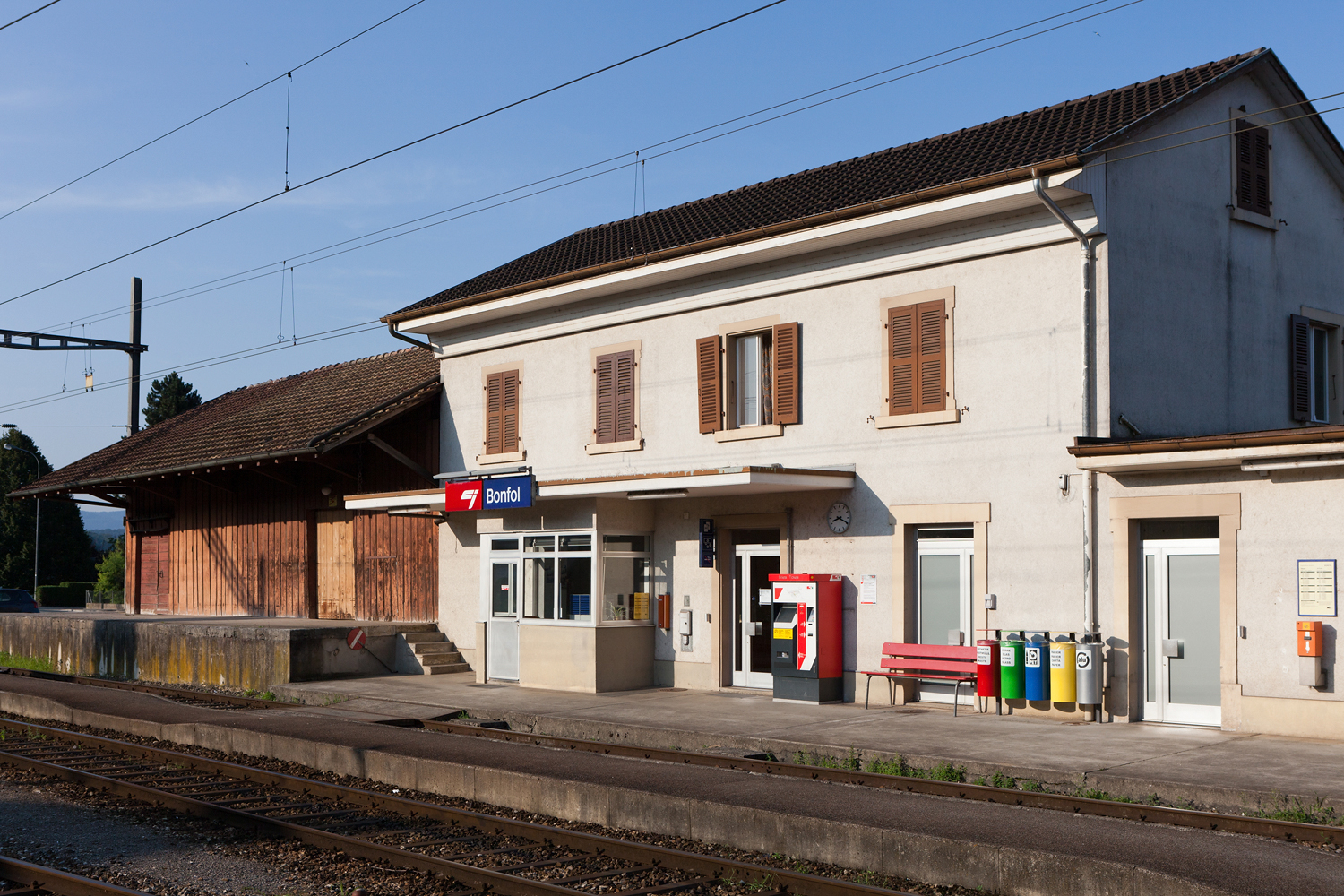
- The station building in 2013

General information
- Location: Bonfol, Jura; Switzerland
- Coordinates: 47°28′28″N 7°09′18″E
- Elevation: 437 m (1,434 ft)
- Owner: Chemins de fer du Jura
- Line: Porrentruy–Bonfol
- Distance: 10.9 km (6.8 mi) from Porrentruy
- Platforms: 1 side platform
- Tracks: 1
- Train operators: Swiss Federal Railways
- Connections: CarPostal SA bus line

Construction
- Accessible: Yes

Other information
- Station code: 8500188 (BONF)
- Fare zone: 23 (Vagabond)

Services
Preceding station	RER Jura	Following station
Terminus	R2	Vendlincourt towards Delémont
Terminus	R22	Vendlincourt towards Porrentruy
Location
- Location within Switzerland Location within Canton of Jura

Bonfol railway station (French: Gare de Bonfol) is a railway station in the municipality of Bonfol, in the Swiss canton of Jura. It is the northern terminus of the standard gauge Porrentruy–Bonfol railway line of Chemins de fer du Jura. The line formerly continued across the French border to Pfetterhouse; passenger service ended 1946 and the line was abandoned in 1970.

== History ==
The station was renovated in 2022 as part of a larger rehabilitation of the Porrentruy–Bonfol railway line. Train services were occasionally replaced by buses, and passengers boarded from temporary platforms 350 metres (1,150 ft) south of the station.

== Services ==
As of the December 2025 timetable change, the following services stop at Bonfol:

- RER Jura: half-hourly service to Porrentruy and hourly service to Delémont.
