= Delle station =

Railway station in France

Delle
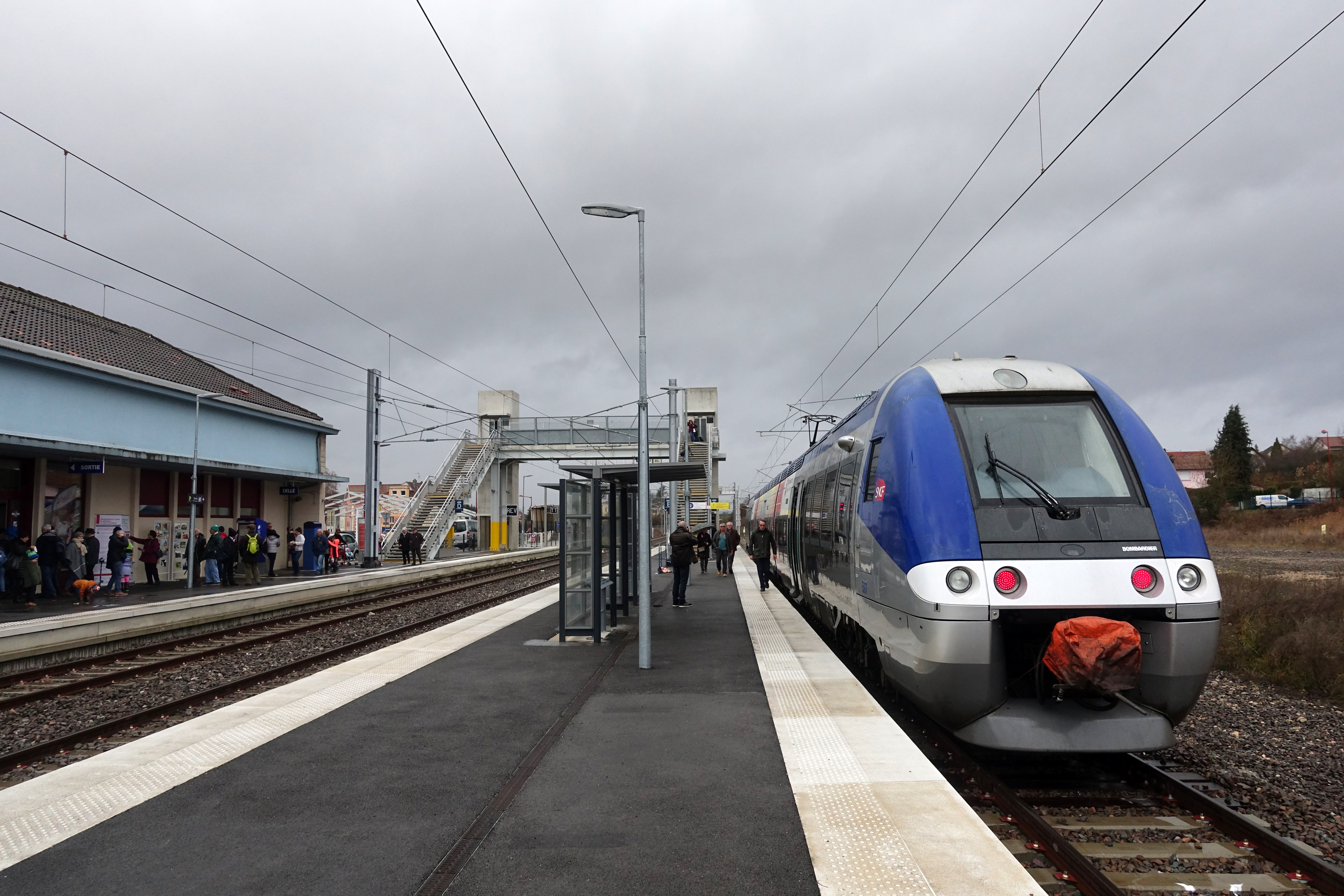
- The station in 2018

General information
- Location: Delle; France
- Coordinates: 47°29′33″N 7°01′00″E
- Owner: SNCF
- Lines: Belfort–Delle line; Delémont–Delle line
- Train operators: SNCF; Swiss Federal Railways
- Connections: Optymo buses

Other information
- Station code: 87184440

History
- Opened: 29 June 1868

Passengers
- 2018: 1,250

Services
Preceding station	TER Bourgogne-Franche-Comté	Following station
Joncherey towards Belfort	TER	Terminus
Preceding station	RER Jura	Following station
Terminus	R1	Boncourt towards Delémont
Terminus	R11	Boncourt towards Porrentruy
Location
- Location within France Location within Bourgogne-Franche-Comté

Delle station (French: Gare de Delle) is a railway station in the commune of Delle, in the French department of Territoire de Belfort, in the Bourgogne-Franche-Comté region. It is located at the border between France and Switzerland and is the junction of the standard gauge Delémont–Delle line of Swiss Federal Railways and the Belfort–Delle line of SNCF.

The station originally opened in 1868, but service was interrupted between 1992–2006, and not fully resumed until 2018. The station opened on 29 June 1868; cross-border service to Switzerland began on 23 September 1872. Passenger service between Belfort and Delle ceased on 26 September 1992, and the station closed in 1995. A joint Franco-Swiss effort to re-open the line led to the resumption of cross-border service in 2006; service to Belfort resumed in 2018.

== Services ==
As of the December 2025 timetable change, the following services stop at Delle:

- TER: hourly service to Belfort.
- RER Jura: half-hourly service to Porrentruy and hourly service to Delémont.
