= RER Jura =

S-Bahn network in Switzerland

Overview
- Native name: French: Réseau express régional Jura
- Locale: Canton of Jura; Bourgogne-Franche-Comté
- Transit type: S-Bahn
- Number of lines: 4

Operation
- Began operation: 14 December 2025; 11 months ago
- Operator: Swiss Federal Railways

Technical
- Track gauge: 1,435 mm (4 ft 8 1/2 in) standard gauge

RER Jura (French: Réseau express régional Jura) is an S-Bahn network in the canton of Jura in Switzerland. It is centered on Porrentruy and began operating in December 2025.

== Lines ==
As of December 2025 the network consists of the following lines:

- : Delémont – Porrentruy – Delle
- : Delémont – Porrentruy – Bonfol
- : Porrentruy – Delle
- : Porrentruy – Bonfol

== History ==
The RER Jura network began operation on 14 December 2025. Between Delémont and Porrentruy, the new R1 and R2 combine for half-hourly service, with hourly service to Delle (France) and Bonfol. This replaced a mix of Basel S-Bahn (S3), RegioExpress (RE56) and Regio (R51) services. The R11 and R22 provide hourly service from Porrentruy to Delle and Bonfol, respectively. Services operate over the Delémont–Delle railway line of Swiss Federal Railways (SBB CFF FFS) and the Porrentruy–Bonfol railway line of Chemins de fer du Jura (CJ).

== See also ==
- Rail transport in France
- Rail transport in Switzerland
