= Delémont–Delle railway =

Railway line in the canton of Jura, Switzerland

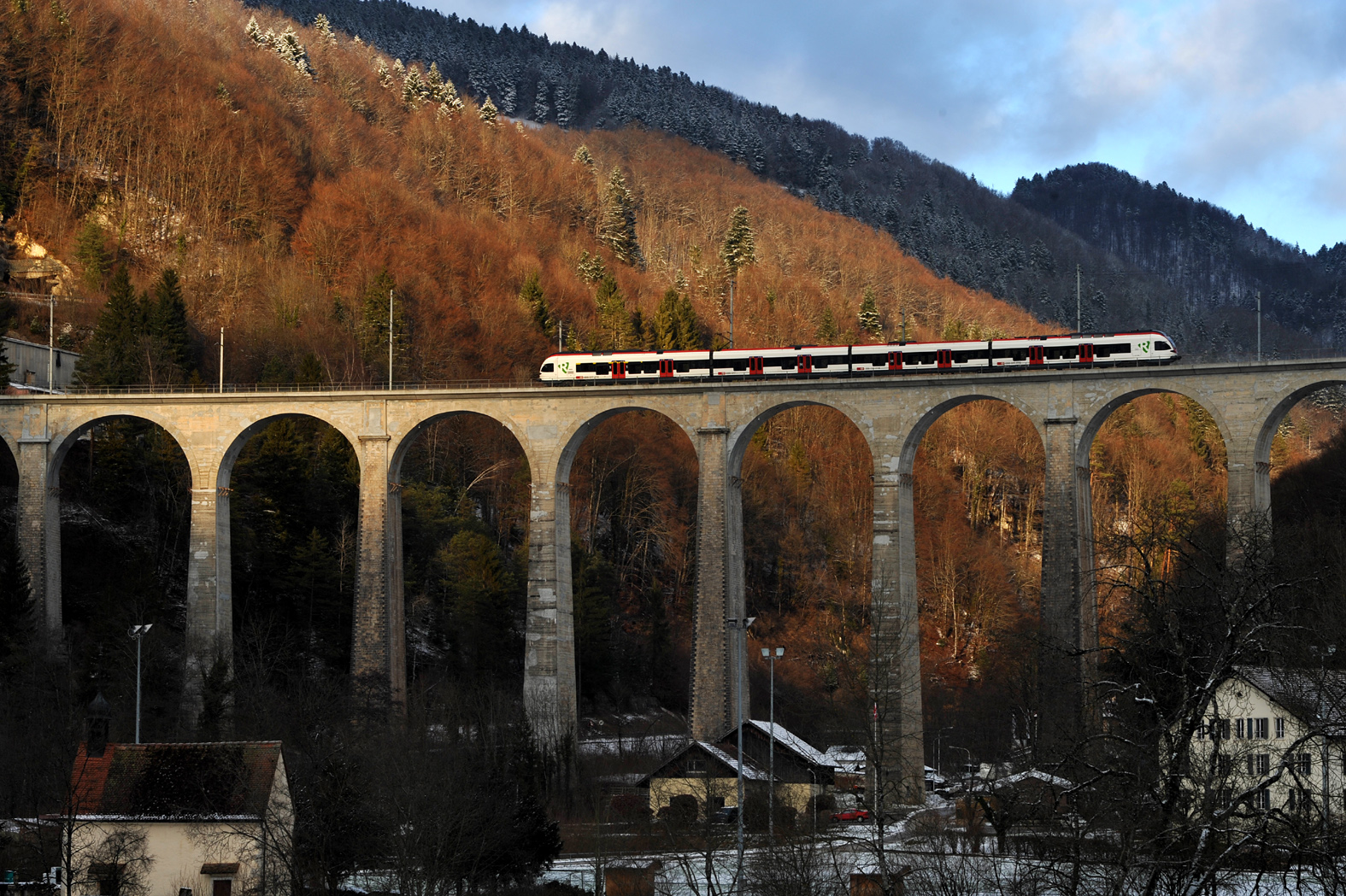
- Combe Maran stone viaduct near Saint-Ursanne with a Flirt set

Overview
- Owner: Swiss Federal Railways
- Line number: 240
- Termini: Delémont; Delle

Technical
- Line length: 39.93 kilometres (24.81 mi) (Switzerland); 0.38 kilometres (0.24 mi) (France)
- Number of tracks: 1
- Track gauge: 1,435 mm (4 ft 8 1/2 in)
- Electrification: 15 kV 16.7 Hz AC overhead catenary
- Maximum incline: 1.6%

The Delémont–Delle railway is a standard gauge railway line in the canton of Jura and belongs to the Swiss Federal Railways (SBB).

The 40 kilometre-long line from Delémont via Glovelier, Porrentruy and Boncourt and the French border to Delle was opened in three stages from 1872 and 1877.

== History ==
The first section of the Porrentruy–Boncourt–Delle line was opened on 23 September 1872 by the Chemin de fer Porrentruy–Delle (PD). This connected in Delle with the Montbéliard–Audincourt–Morvillars–Delle railway, which was opened on 29 June 1868 by the Chemins de fer de Paris à Lyon et à la Méditerranée (PLM). With the cession of Alsace to the German Empire in 1871, Delle became the northernmost border station between Switzerland and France.

The PD was taken over by the Chemins de fer du Jura bernois (French for "Bernese Jura Railway", JB) on 16 August 1876. The JB quickly developed into the largest railway company in the Bernese Jura as the result of its rapid construction and the purchase of two other railway companies.

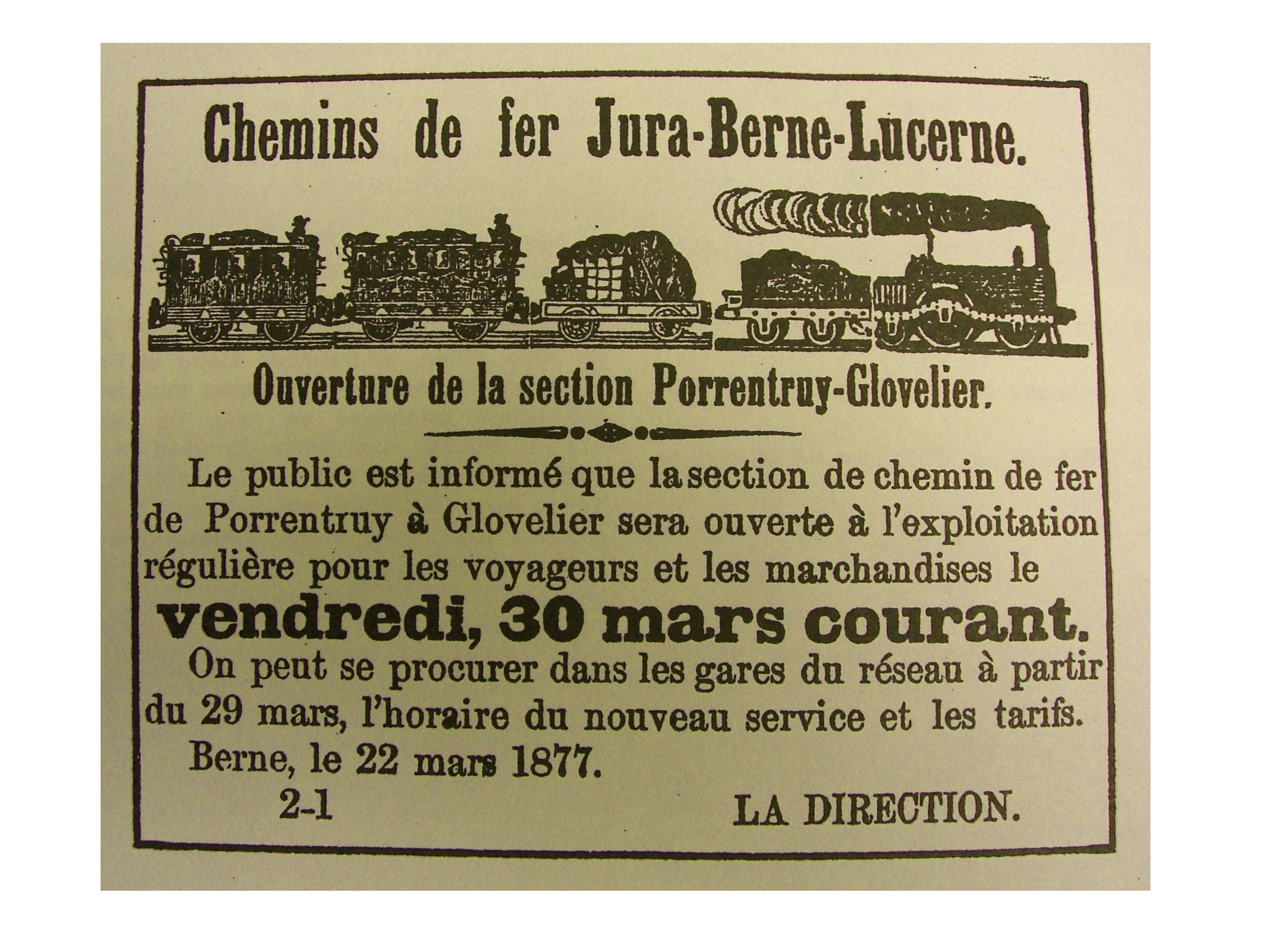
Announcement for the opening of the line on 30 March 1877

Military traffic during the First World War in the Porrentruy station

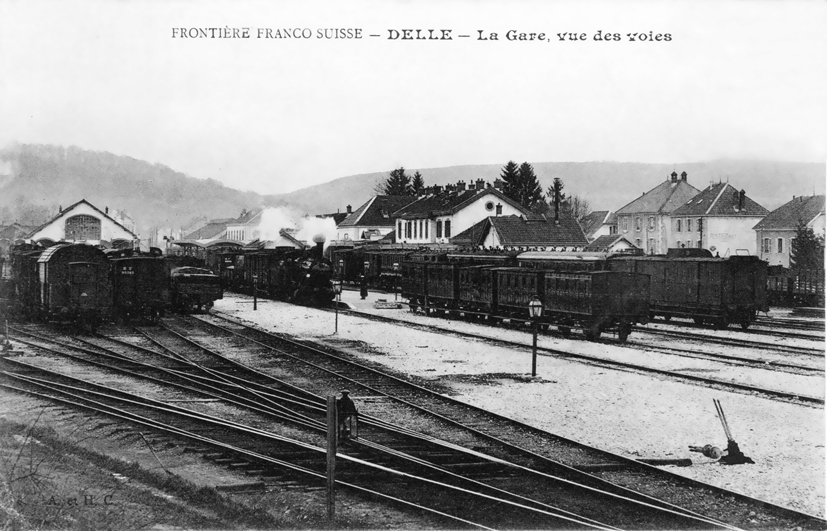
Extensive traffic at Delle station before electrification

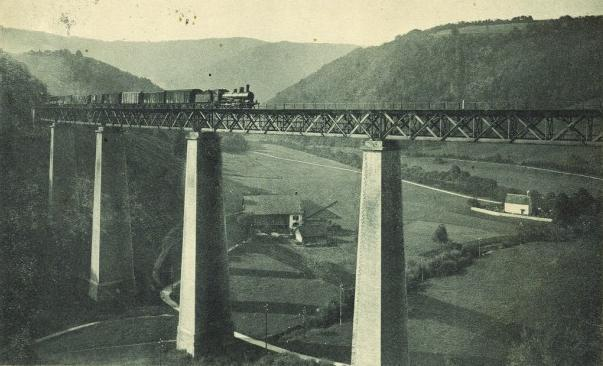
Combe Maran Viaduct in its original state

The JB opened the Delémont–Glovelier section on 15 October 1876. The line was connected with the former PD line on 30 March 1877 with the opening of the Glovelier–Porrentruy section, which has elaborate engineering structures.

This connection with the rest of the Swiss standard gauge network also marked the beginning of a boom in rail traffic via the Delle border station. The Chemins de fer de l'Est (l'Est), which had lost part of its network and access to Basel with the cession of Alsace, opened the Belfort–Morvillars link, which branches from the Paris–Mulhouse in Danjoutin, on 13 August 1877. L'Est also built its own second track between Morvillars and Delle.

The owner of the Delémont–Delle line changed its name several times in the next few years: the JB was renamed the Jura–Bern–Luzern (JBL) on 1 July 1884 and the JBL then merged with the Western Switzerland–Simplon Company (Compagnie de la Suisse Occidentale et du Simplon, SOS) on 1 January 1890 to form the Jura–Simplon Railway (Compagnie des Chemins de Fer Jura–Simplon, JS). The JS was one of the five major private railway companies in Switzerland, which were nationalised and integrated to form the Swiss Federal Railways (SBB) on 1 May 1903.

In addition to international passenger trains, it was used by freight trains from France via Delle in particular, as the old access to Basel ran through Alsace and thus through German territory. In order to avoid the additional customs clearances, trains were routed via Delle to Delémont and on to Basel or to Biel. In terms of the volume of goods in transit, Porrentruy station ranked fourth in 1913. The line between Delémont and Biel was considerably shortened with the commissioning of the Grenchenberg Tunnel in 1915.

SBB electrical operations under 15 kV 16 2/3 Hz AC was recorded on the Delémont–Delle line on 15 May 1933 and the SBB also electrified the short section between the state border and Delle station.

With the nationalisation of the PLM and L'Est on 1 January 1938, the French connecting lines became the property of the SNCF. After the outbreak of the Second World War, the border traffic via Delle came to a standstill.

Rail traffic was resumed after the Second World War and Switzerland and France agreed to build a new border station in Delle in 1948. On the French side, however, a downturn began and the last double-track section between Morvillars and Delle was dismantled in 1953 to reduce maintenance costs. Rather than carrying out the intended electrification of the line, the SNCF finally electrified the line to Basel SNCF instead in 1957. A new border station was opened in Delle in 1967 despite all the problems.

Over time, Delle gradually lost its importance as a border crossing to the electrified border crossings in Basel, Les Verrières and Vallorbe. The last through trains between Delémont and Belfort—with good connections to long-distance trains to Paris—were abandoned on 26 September 1992 and the SNCF closed the Belfort–Delle line for passenger transport. Cross-border freight traffic on the Boncourt–Delle section was discontinued by the SBB on 30 June 1993 and in the same year the SNCF also completely closed the Morvillars–Delle section.

From a timetable change on 27 May 1995, the SBB ceased to operate to Delle station from the Swiss side. With the abolition of passenger traffic, the Boncourt–Delle section was closed and de-electrified on 1 June 1996. Since the former Delle border station was disused, virtually all the tracks of the sprawling station were dismantled in 1996 and 1997.

On 16 September 1996, the NPZ regional service between Porrentruy and Delémont ran into locomotive Re 4/4 II 11304 running from Delémont to Glovelier in Courfaivre. 30 people were injured, two of them seriously. The driver of the NPZ was distracted by young people who obstructed the door lock.

After 2000, the first proposals were made to reactivate the Belfort–Delle line and resume cross-border passenger traffic. Following the launch of the LGV Rhin-Rhône, the Belfort – Montbéliard TGV station on the Belfort–Delle line is now served by regional trains from Belfort and Switzerland, which run over the old line.

The 1.6 km-long Boncourt–Delle section was reactivated as a first symbolic step. The costs of around CHF 1.3 million were primarily borne by the Franche-Comté region and the canton of Jura, with financial contributions from France, Switzerland, the EU, the RFF, the SBB, SNCF and the municipality of Delle. The partially overgrown line had to be cleared and the substructure renewed for the reopening. A new track was laid in the previously trackless Delle station and the line was re-electrified. After an official inauguration ceremony on 8 December by the SBB, SNCF and the municipality of Delle, cross-border rail traffic was resumed by the SBB from the timetable change on 10 December 2006.

Originally scheduled for the 2017 timetable change, the Belfort–Delle line has been reactivated and thus allows the route from Porrentruy to Belfort to be operated again. There is also a connection to the TGV network at Belfort-Montbéliard TGV station in Meroux. After delays, the official reopening took place on 6 December 2018 and regular operations on the Belfort–Delle line were resumed at the 9 December timetable change.

== Engineering Structure ==
The Combe Mara viaduct near St-Ursanne was built between 1875 and 1876 by the Decker brothers from Cannstatt in Württemberg. At 50 metres high, it swings in a gentle curve over the valley. Originally built as a five-pillar viaduct with steel trusses, it was reinforced with additional pillars between 1929 and 1930.

== Connecting routes ==
Delémont

- The Delémont–Basel line was opened on 25 September 1875 by the JB.
- The Moutier–Delémont line was opened on 16 December 1876 by the JB.

Glovelier

- The Saignelégier–Glovelier line was opened on 21 May 1904 by Régional Saignelégier–Glovelier (RSG). After the merger of RSG into CJ, the line was closed on 8 May 1948 and converted to metre gauge. Since the reopening on 4 October 1953 in Glovellier there has been a transporter wagon system for the transhipment and transport of standard gauge cars on the metre gauge line.

Porrentruy

- The Porrentruy–Bonfol railway was opened on 14 July 1901 by the RPB.

Courtemaîche

- The Courtemaîche–Bure railway was opened on 19 March 1968 by the Swiss Confederation and is used for military transport to the Bure arms depot.

Delle

- The Belfort–Delle was opened on 29 June 1868 by the PLM.

== Rail services ==
Since December 2004, trains on line S3 of the Basel Regional S-Bahn have run from Basel to Porrentruy. Between December 2010 and 2015, another half-hourly service departed from Delémont to Glovelier with connections in Delémont to the ICN and the RegioExpress services. Since the 2014 timetable, RegioExpress services run every hour between Delle, Delémont and Biel / Bienne; these were extended in the 2019 timetable to Meroux (Belfort-Montbéliard TGV).
