= Delémont railway station =

Railway station in Delémont, Switzerland

Delémont
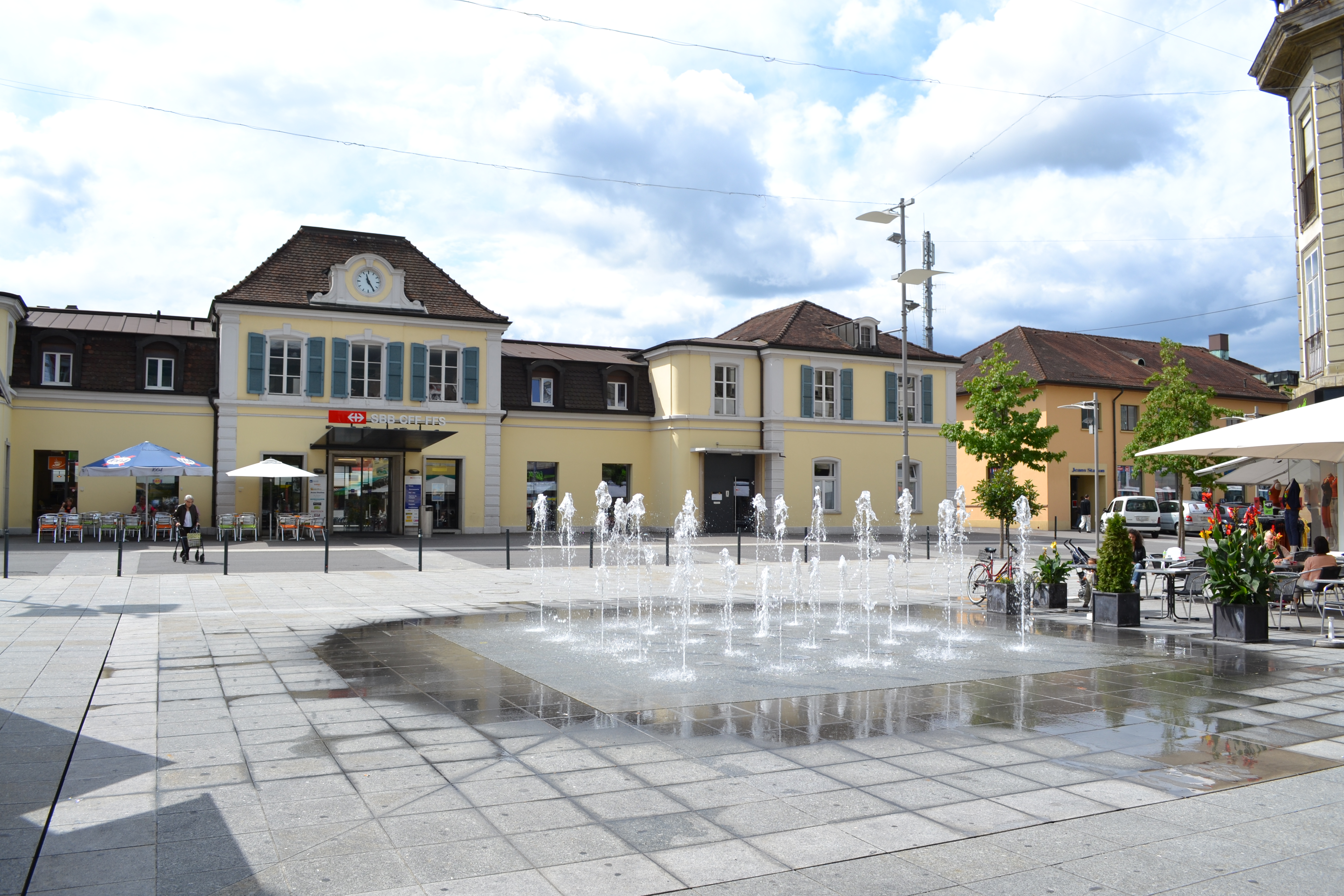
- The station building and the Fontaine de l'Europe, 2011.

General information
- Location: Place de la Gare 13; Delémont; Switzerland
- Coordinates: 47°21′43″N 7°21′00″E
- Elevation: 413 m (1,355 ft)
- Owner: Swiss Federal Railways
- Lines: Basel–Biel/Bienne line; Delémont–Delle line
- Distance: 84.6 km (52.6 mi) from Olten
- Platforms: 3
- Tracks: 5
- Train operators: BLS AG; Swiss Federal Railways
- Connections: CarPostal SA buses

Construction
- Parking: Yes (120 spaces)
- Cycle facilities: Yes (156 spaces)
- Accessible: Partly

Other information
- Station code: 8500109 (DMT)
- Fare zone: 10 (Vagabond)

History
- Opened: 23 September 1875

Passengers
- 2023: 9'100 per weekday (SBB)

Services
Preceding station	SBB CFF FFS	Following station
Reverses direction	IC 51	Moutier towards Biel/Bienne
Reverses direction	IC 51	Laufen towards Basel SBB
Preceding station	BLS	Following station
Reverses direction	IR 56	Moutier towards Biel/Bienne
Reverses direction	IR 56	Laufen towards Basel SBB
Preceding station	RER Jura	Following station
Courtételle towards Delle	R1	Terminus
Courtételle towards Bonfol	R2	Terminus
Preceding station	Basel S-Bahn	Following station
Terminus	S3 Limited service	Laufen towards Olten
Location
- Location within Switzerland Location within Canton of Jura

Delémont railway station (French: Gare de Delémont) serves the municipality of Delémont, the capital city of the Canton of Jura, Switzerland. Opened in 1875, the station is owned and operated by Swiss Federal Railways. It forms part of the Jura railway (Basel SBB–Biel/Bienne), and is also the junction for the Delémont–Delle railway, a cross-border link with France.

The Delémont roundhouse, located within the station yard, is listed as a Swiss heritage site of national significance (class A).

== History ==
The station was opened on 23 September 1875, together with the rest of the Basel–Delémont section of the Jura railway. Just over a year later, on 15 October 1876, the station became a junction, when the Delémont–Glovelier section of the Delémont–Delle railway was opened. During World War II, the railway station was accidentally bombed on 8 September 1944 by the Allies, injuring a number of railway employees.

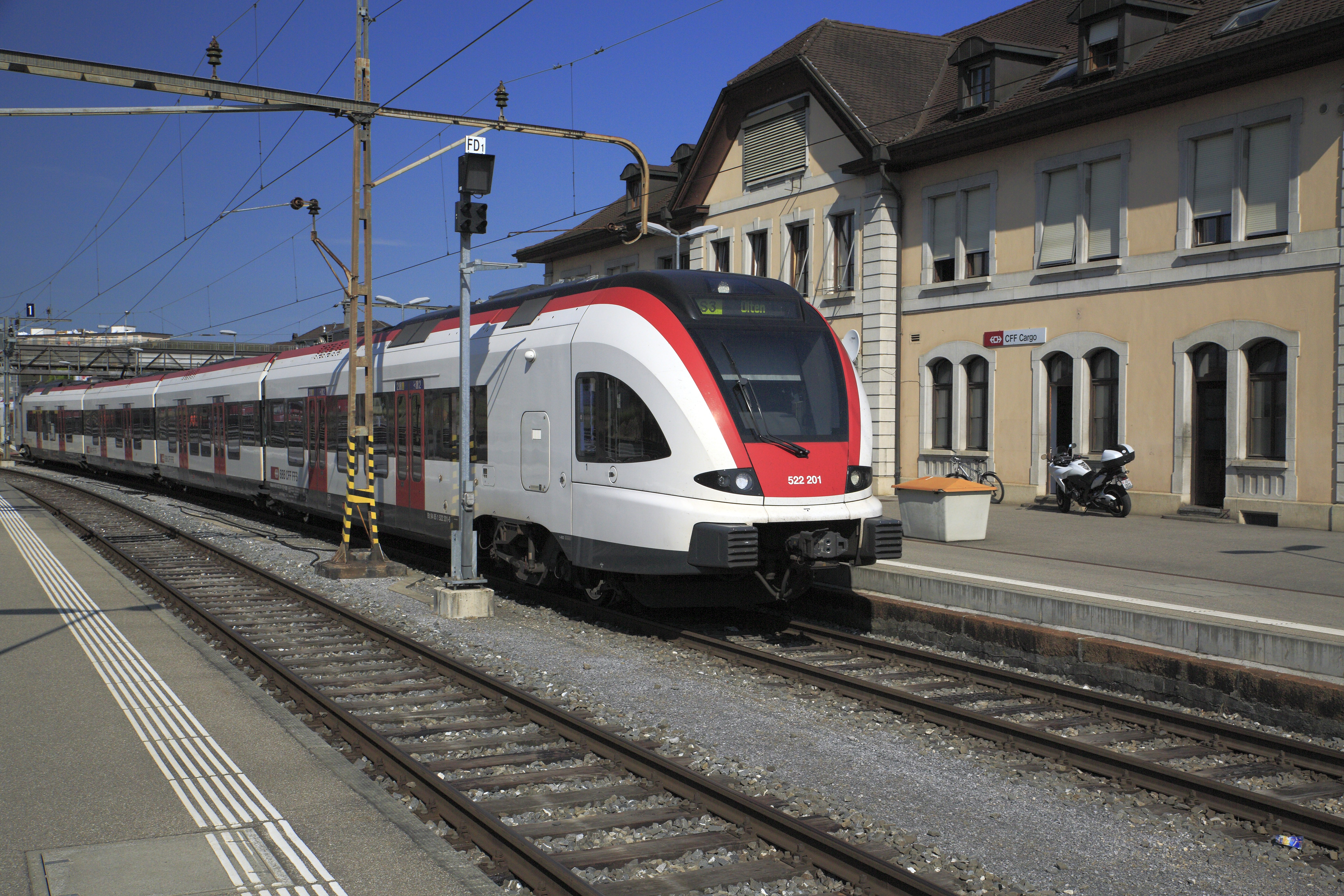
Station in 2014

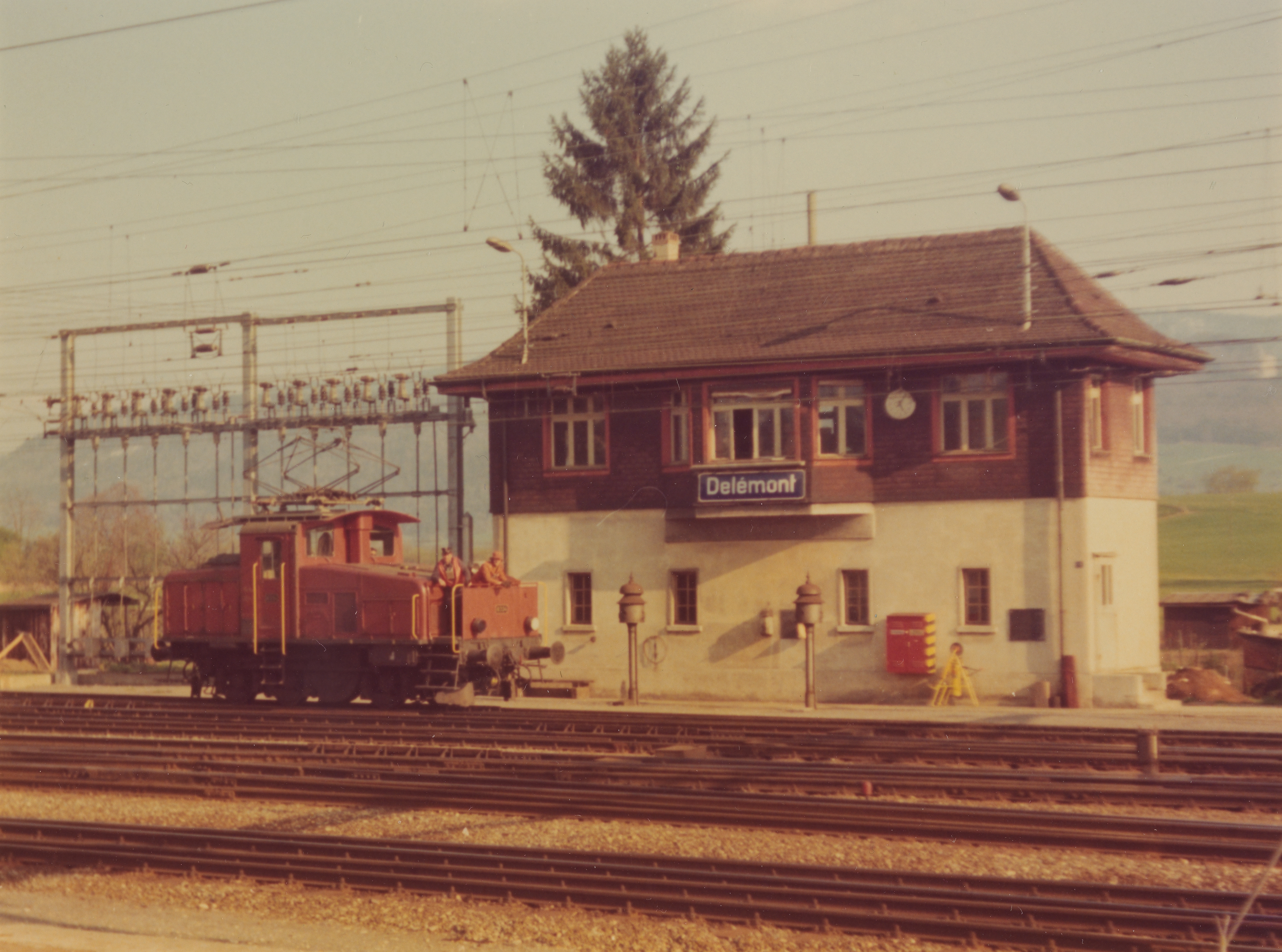
Signal box (1976)

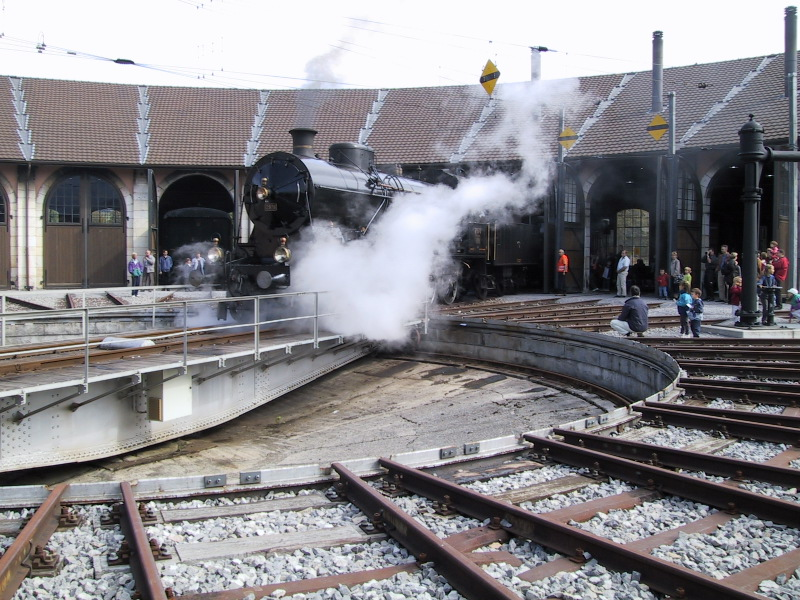
Rotonde (2000)

== Location ==
Delémont railway station is situated on the southwestern edge of the city centre.

== Facilities ==
The station offers a number of services, such as ticket sales, Western Union, café, kiosk, and shops.

== Services ==
As of the December 2025 timetable change, the following services stop at Delémont:

- InterCity / InterRegio: half-hourly service between Biel/Bienne and Basel SBB and hourly service to Lausanne.
- RER Jura: half-hourly service between to Porrentruy and hourly service to Delle and Bonfol.
- Basel S-Bahn: two trains per day to Olten.

== See also ==
- History of rail transport in Switzerland
- Rail transport in Switzerland
