= France–Switzerland border =

International border

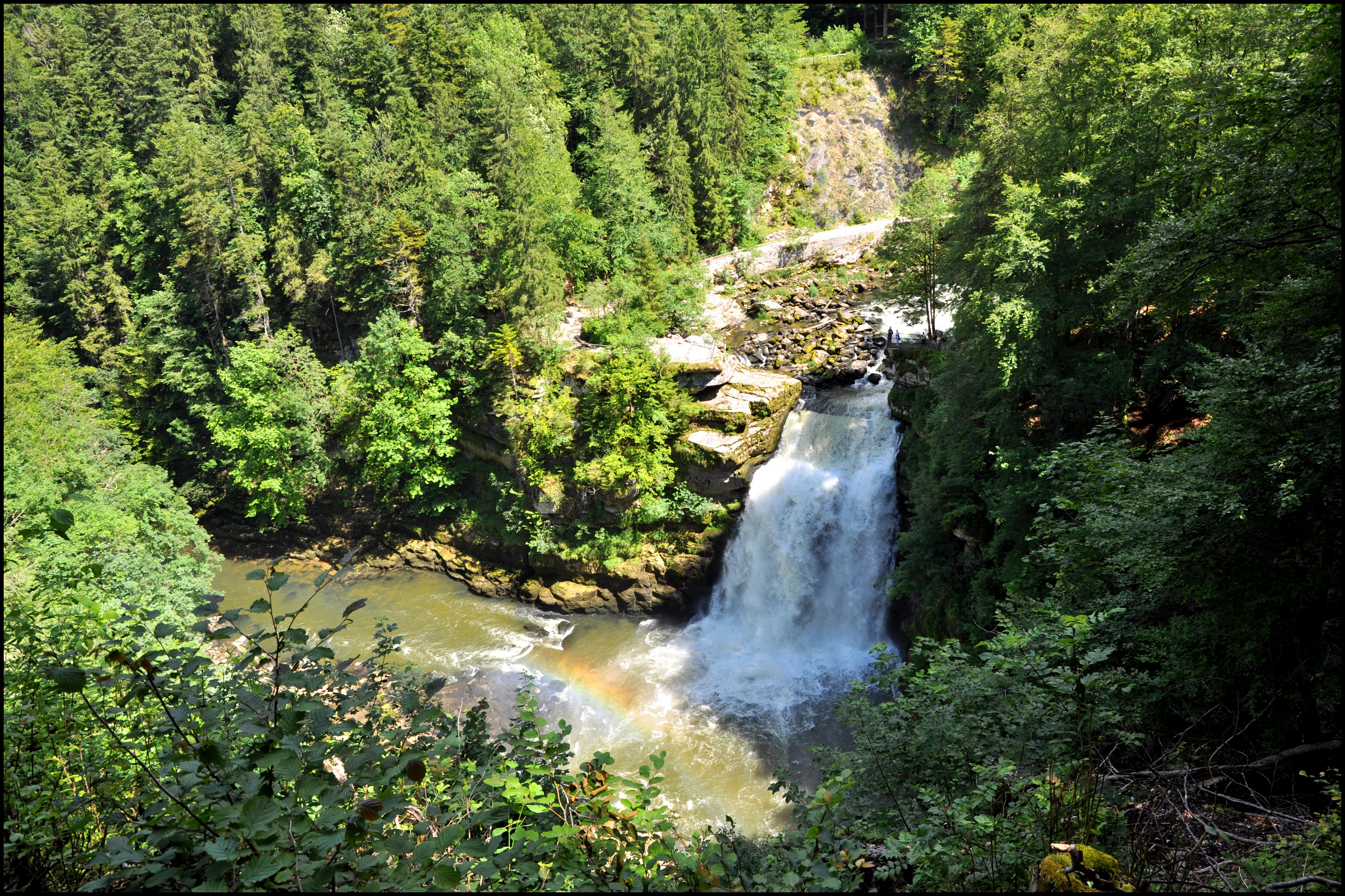
- The border on the river Doubs at the Saut du Doubs waterfall between Doubs, France and Neuchâtel, Switzerland

Characteristics
- Entities: France Switzerland
- Length: 572 km (355 mi)

The France–Switzerland border is 572 km (355 mi) long. Its current path is mostly the product of the Congress of Vienna of 1815, with the accession of Geneva, Neuchâtel and Valais to the Swiss Confederation, but it has since been modified in detail, the last time being in 2002. Although most of the border, marked with border stones, is unguarded, several checkpoints remain staffed, most notably on busy roads.

== Detailed path ==
The tripoint where the border meets the Germany–Switzerland border and France–Germany border is in the river Rhine (at 47.5898°N 7.5890°E) north of Basel. A monument has been built near it, known as the Dreiländereck.

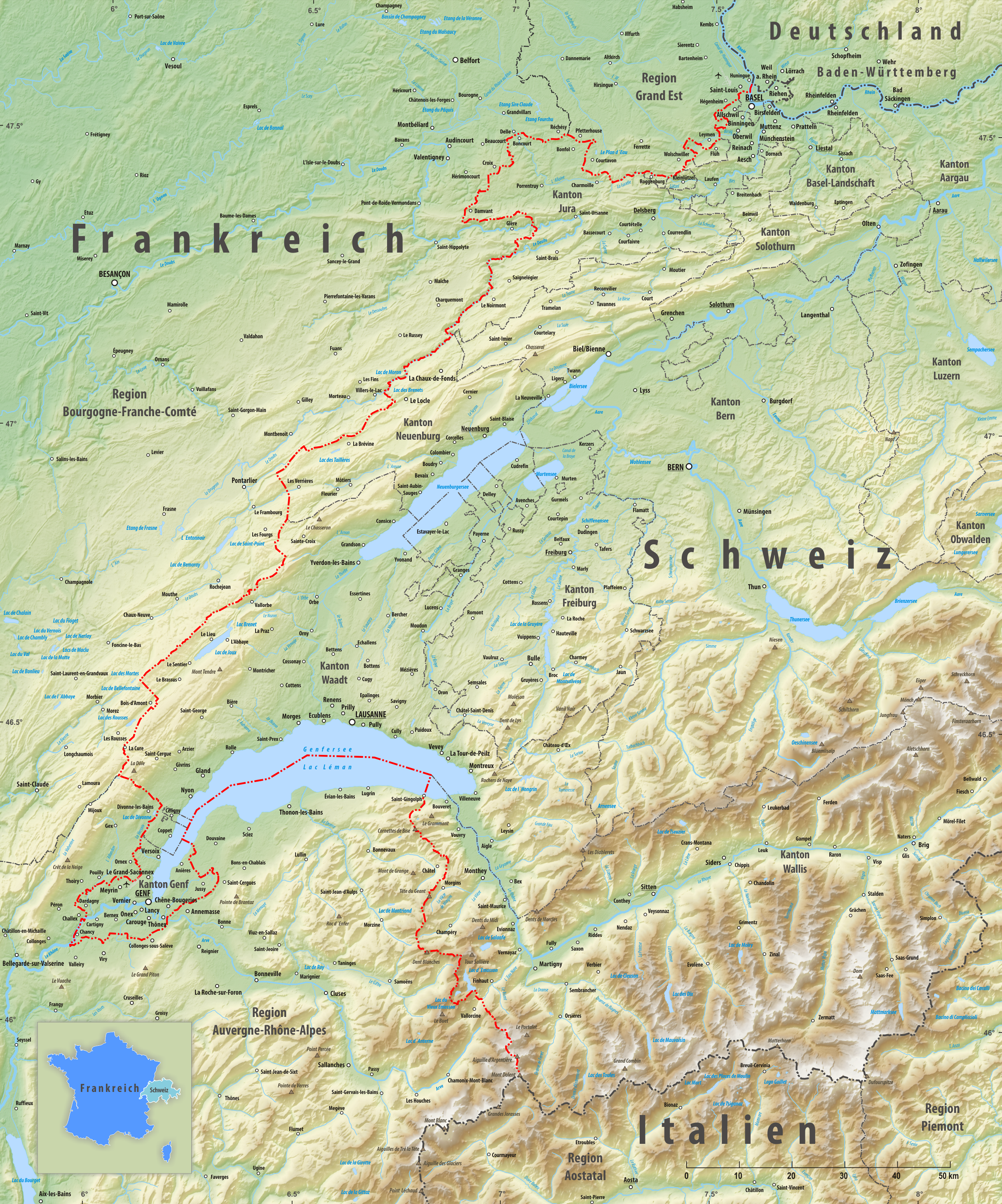
Border map

Soldiers shaking hands on the Alsatian part of the France–Switzerland border during World War I

The border follows the Upper Rhine for about 1.5 km (0.93 mi). It then runs south of EuroAirport Basel Mulhouse Freiburg and then towards the southwest, separating the villages of Schönenbuch (Switzerland), Neuwiller (France), Leymen (France) and Rodersdorf (Switzerland).

It then enters the Jura Mountains chain, rising above 800 m (2,600 ft) of altitude before meeting the La Lucelle river at 460 m (1,510 ft), between Roggenburg, Basel-Country and Kiffis (France). It follows the Lucelle as far as Lucelle municipality, running across the grounds of Lucelle Abbey. It then turns north to include the Swiss canton of Jura; it crosses the Doubs river at Brémoncourt, to include the Clos du Doubs region in Switzerland. It meets the Doubs a second time further upstream, at 481 m (1,578 ft). From here, it follows the winding course of the river as far as the Lac des Brenets, north of Le Locle, at 756 m (2,480 ft).

After passing the Col des Roches at 920 m (3,020 ft), the border runs in a south-westerly direction, generally following the Jura ridge, reaching an altitude of 1,288 m (4,226 ft) (Le Meix Musy). It turns towards the south to include Pontarlier in France and again to the southwest to include Vallorbe and the Lac de Joux in Switzerland. Here it reaches an altitude of 1,377 m (4,518 ft), before crossing the Orbe river upstream of Bois-d'Amont.

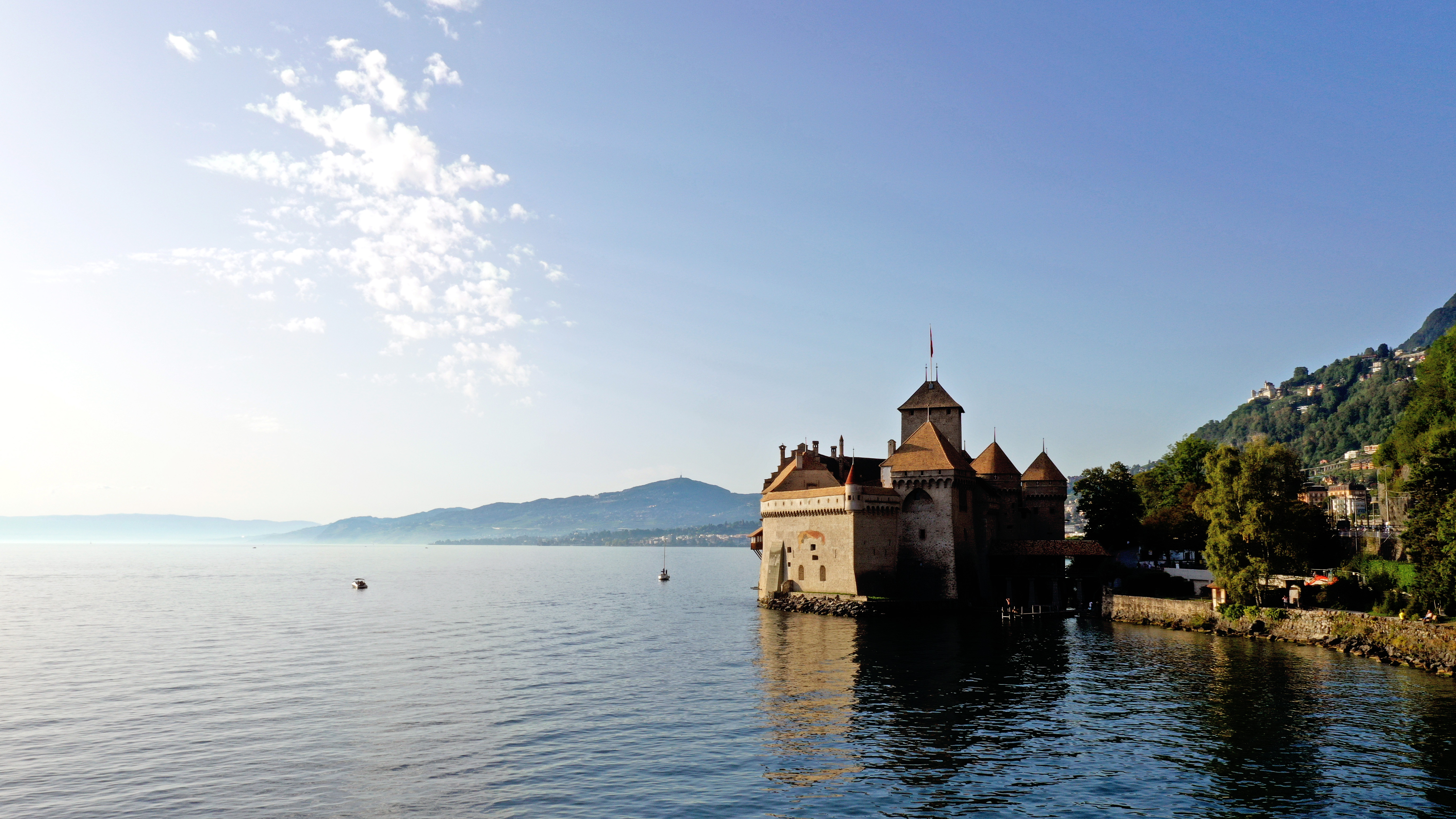
The France–Switzerland border crosses Lake Geneva.

South of Les Rousses it turns to the south and then southeast, running towards Lake Geneva, rising to 1,400 m (4,600 ft) at 46.4113°N 6.0866°E, passing south of La Dôle peak. Some 3 km (1.9 mi) before reaching the lake, the border runs parallel to the shore of Lake Geneva, forming the strip of land ceded by France to Switzerland in 1815 as the canton of Geneva, so that the City of Geneva has a land bridge connecting it to the rest of Switzerland.

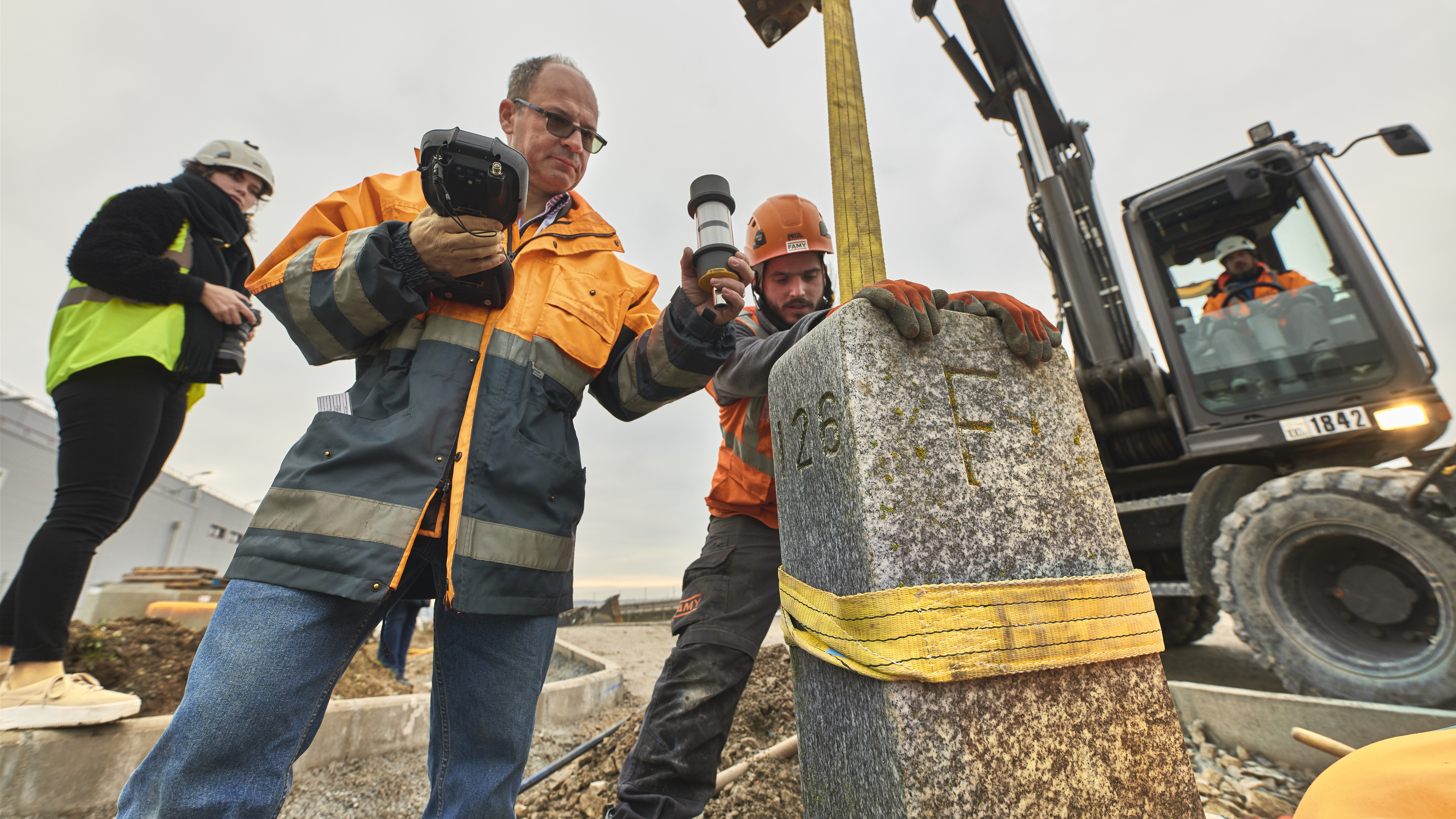
Three of the border stones in the canton of Geneva, nos 124, 125 and 126, are located on the CERN Meyrin site, which implies special agreements between France and Switzerland.

The border now encircles the City of Geneva. West of the city, it follows the Rhône for some 6 km (3.7 mi), until the westernmost point of Switzerland, at 46.1324°N 5.9559°E. The border passes between Geneva and Annemasse, heading east towards Saint-Cergues; it finally finds Lake Geneva from the south, at Hermance.

The border runs along the centre of Lake Geneva, but makes landfall before reaching the mouth of the Rhône, at Saint-Gingolph, which marks the western end of the Saint-Gingolph–Saint-Maurice railway in Switzerland. A project exists to reuse a now-abandoned line to Évian-les-Bains in France and thereby reconnect the two countries by train on the south shore of Lake Geneva. From here, the border runs south and southeast into the High Alps, forming the western border of the Valais. It passes Les Cornettes de Bise (2,431 m (7,976 ft)), the Dent de Barme (2,759 m (9,052 ft)), Petit Ruan (2,846 m (9,337 ft)), the Pointe des Rosses (2,965 m (9,728 ft)), the Pointe de la Fenive (2,838 m (9,311 ft)) and Le Cheval Blanc (2,830 m (9,280 ft)), placing the Lac du Vieux Émosson in Switzerland. From Grand Perrond (2,672 m (8,766 ft)), the border descends to 1,130 m (3,710 ft), crossing the road from Martigny to Chamonix, before ascending to Les Grandes Otanes (2,656 m (8,714 ft)), the Aiguille du Tour (3,541 m (11,617 ft)), the Aiguille d'Argentière (3,898 m (12,789 ft)), Tour Noir (3,837 m (12,589 ft)) and finally to the tripoint with the French–Italian and Swiss–Italian borders, at a point just west of Mont Dolent, 45.9227°N 7.0441°E and at 3,752 metres (12,310 ft) altitude.

== Border checks ==
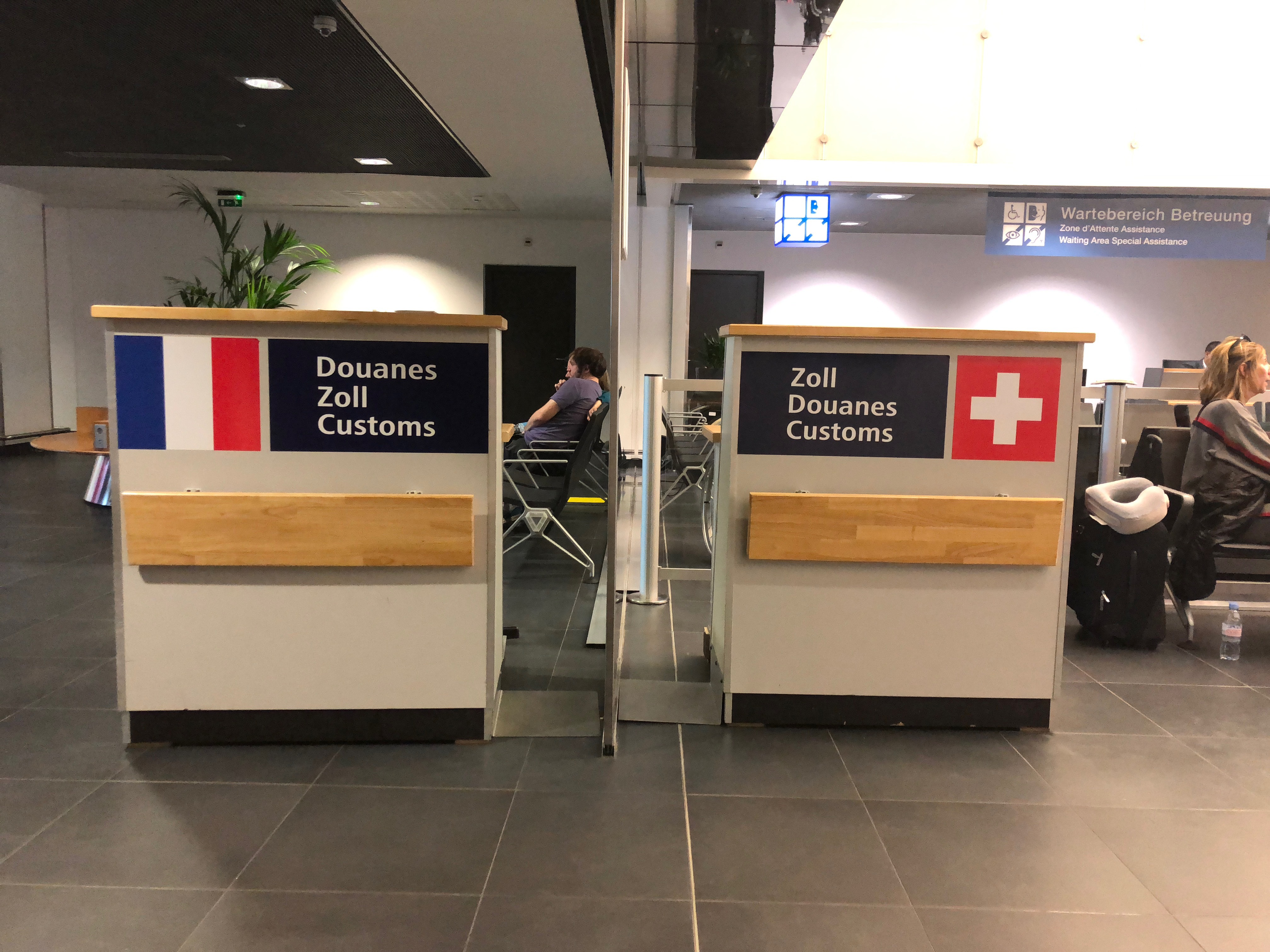
French–Swiss customs post in EuroAirport Basel Mulhouse Freiburg, 2018

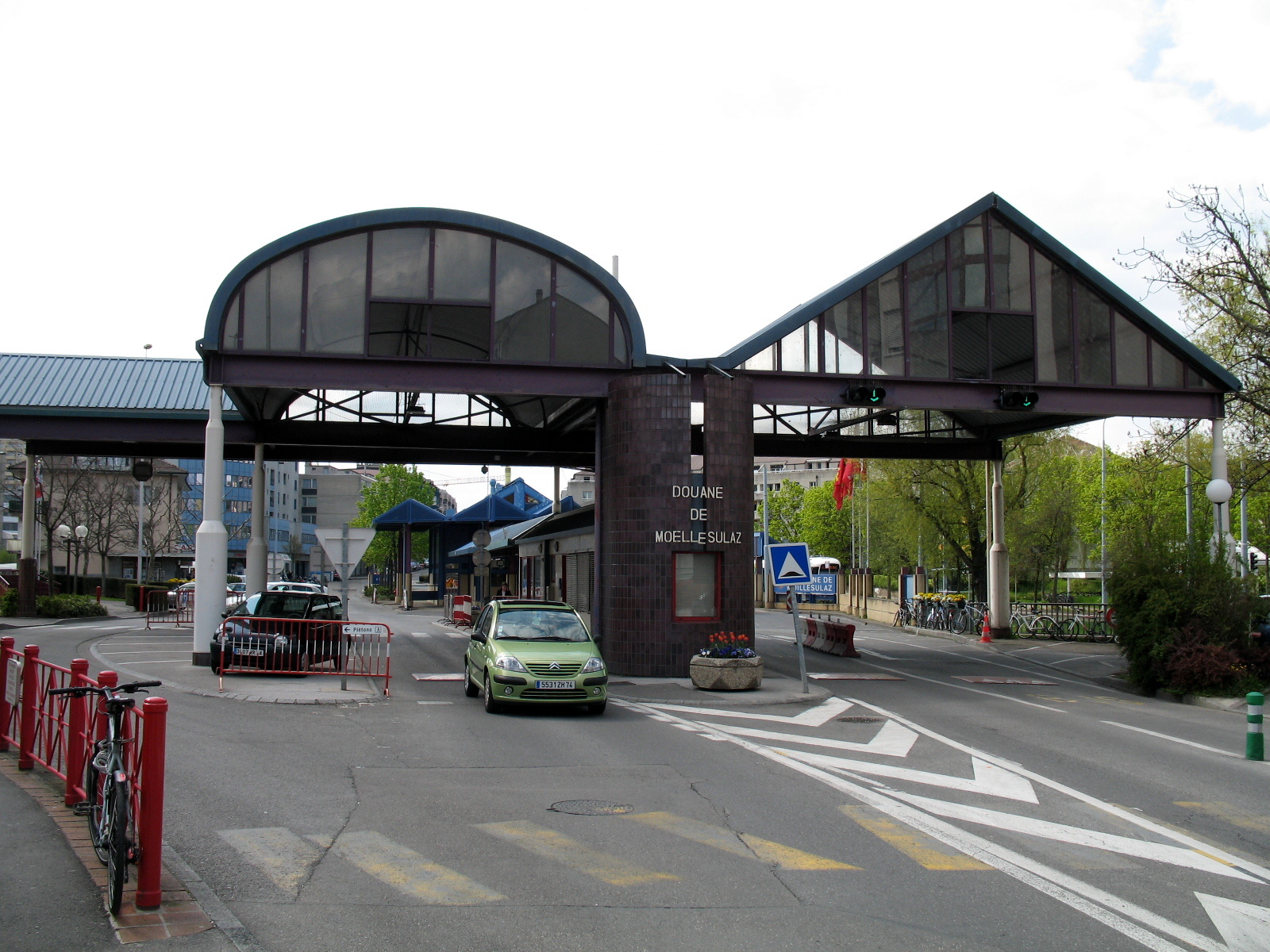
French–Swiss customs post in Moillesulaz

Since Switzerland's accession to the Schengen Area in 2008, there have been no permanent passport controls along the border, although there can be customs controls.

There are two airports near the border which have both Swiss and French passport and customs controls; passengers are free to choose one. These are: EuroAirport Basel Mulhouse Freiburg which is located in France, but passengers can go to Switzerland without going through French border controls; and Geneva Airport which is located in Switzerland, but passengers arriving on flights from France can go to France without going through Swiss border controls. The Geneva Airport runway was extended in 1960 after France and Switzerland swapped territories to make this possible.

== Road customs control stations ==
An incomplete list of Customs stations from northeast to south:

- Basel/St. Louis-Autobahn (E25/A35/A3)
- Boncourt/Delle-Autoroute (E27/N1019/A16)
- Col France (D461/20)
- Vallorbe (E23/N57/9)
- Bardonnex (A41/1)
- Thônex-Vallard (A411)
- St-Gingolph (D1005/21)

There are several other roads which cross the border, but most are without staffed customs controls.

== Transportation ==
=== Rail ===
As of the December 2023 timetable change, cross-border services between France and Switzerland exist on the following railway lines (from North to South):

- Strasbourg–Basel railway between Saint-Louis and Basel St. Johann (served by TER, TGV)
- Delémont–Delle railway between Delle and Boncourt (served by RER Jura)
- Besançon–Le Locle railway line between Morteau and Le Locle-Col-des-Roches (served by TER)
- Neuchâtel–Pontarlier railway between Pontarlier and Travers (served by TER and RE9)
- Dijon–Vallorbe railway between Labergement-Sainte-Marie and Vallorbe (served by TER)
- Lyon–Geneva railway between Pougny—Chancy and La Plaine (served by Léman Express line L6, TER, TGV)
- CEVA rail between Annemasse and Chêne-Bourg (served by Léman Express lines L1, L2, L3, L4 and RE33)
- Longeray-Léaz–Bouveret railway (Tonkin Railway) between Meillerie and Saint-Gingolph (cross-border section currently closed)
- Saint-Gervais–Vallorcine railway between Vallorcine and Le Châtelard-Frontière (served by TER, R)

=== Tram ===
As of the December 2023 timetable change, the following tram lines operate on cross-border routes:

- Basel tram Line 3 was extended to Saint-Louis in France in 2017
- Basel tram Line 10 twice, with one station (Leymen) in France
- Geneva tram Line 17 was extended to Annemasse in France in 2019

== Large Hadron Collider ==
The Large Hadron Collider (LHC), the world's largest and highest-energy particle accelerator, built by the European Organization for Nuclear Research (CERN), extends across the border near the Swiss city of Geneva.

== See also ==
- France–Switzerland relations
