= Le Locle Le Chalet railway station =

Railway station in Le Locle, Switzerland

Le Locle Le Chalet
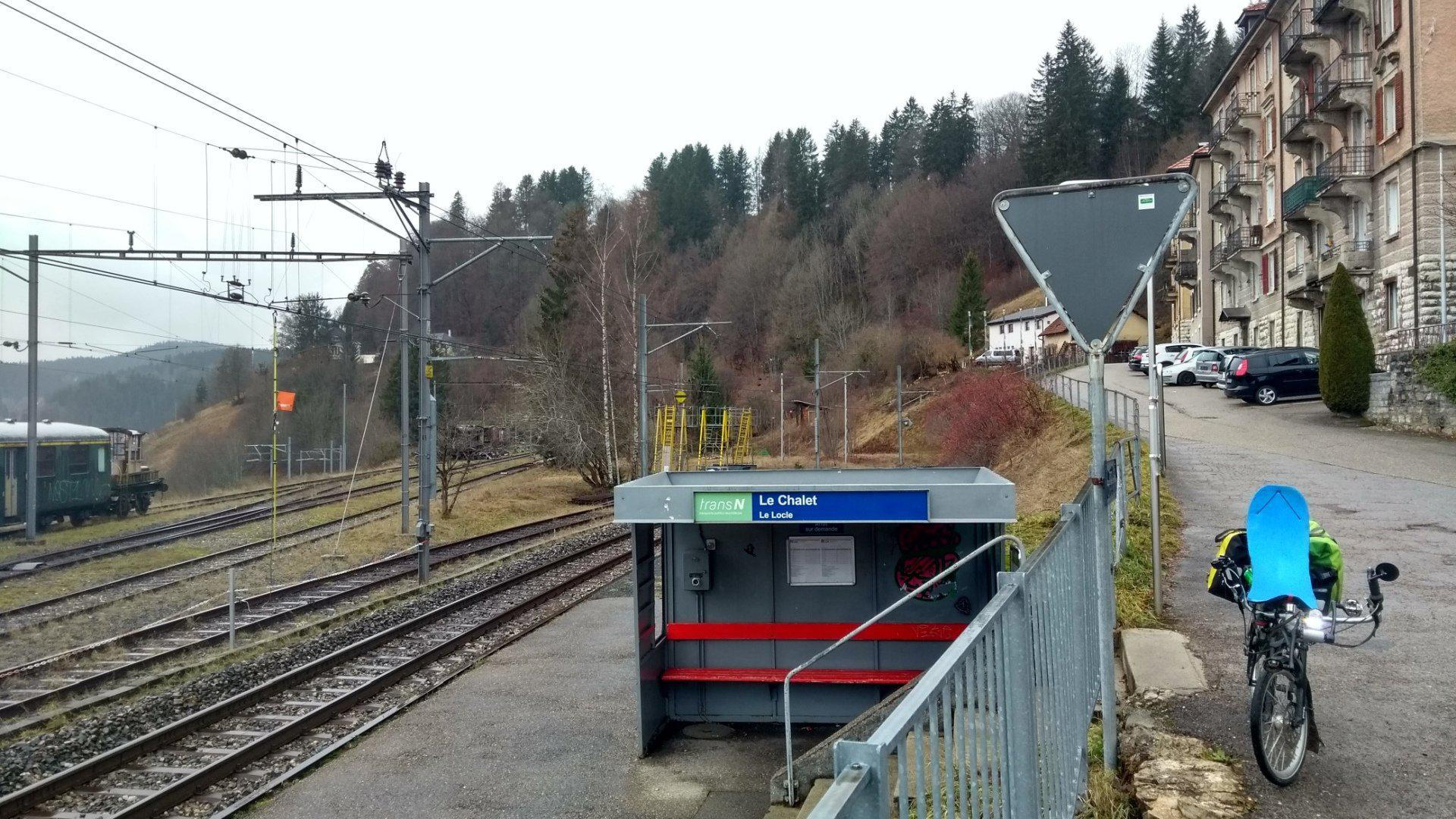
- The station in 2018

General information
- Location: Le Locle, Neuchâtel; Switzerland
- Coordinates: 47°03′21″N 6°44′20″E
- Elevation: 944 m (3,097 ft)
- Owner: Transports publics Neuchâtelois
- Line: Le Locle–Les Brenets line
- Distance: 0.5 km (0.31 mi) from Le Locle
- Platforms: 1 side platform
- Tracks: 1
- Train operators: Transports publics Neuchâtelois
- Connections: Transports publics Neuchâtelois bus lines

Construction
- Accessible: No

Other information
- Station code: 8530260 (CHET)
- Fare zone: 20 (Onde Verte)

Services
Preceding station	Transports publics Neuchâtelois	Following station
Les Frêtes towards Les Brenets	R24	Le Locle Terminus
Location
- Location within Switzerland Location within Canton of Neuchâtel

Le Locle Le Chalet railway station (French: Gare de Le Locle Le Chalet), also known as Le Chalet NE, is a railway station in the municipality of Le Locle, in the Swiss canton of Neuchâtel. It is located on the 1,000 mm (3 ft 3 3/8 in) Le Locle–Les Brenets line of the Transports publics Neuchâtelois.

== Services ==
As of the December 2024 timetable change, the following services stop at Le Locle Le Chalet:

- Regio: hourly or better service between Le Locle and Les Brenets.
