= Les Frêtes railway station =

Railway station in Le Locle, Switzerland

Les Frêtes
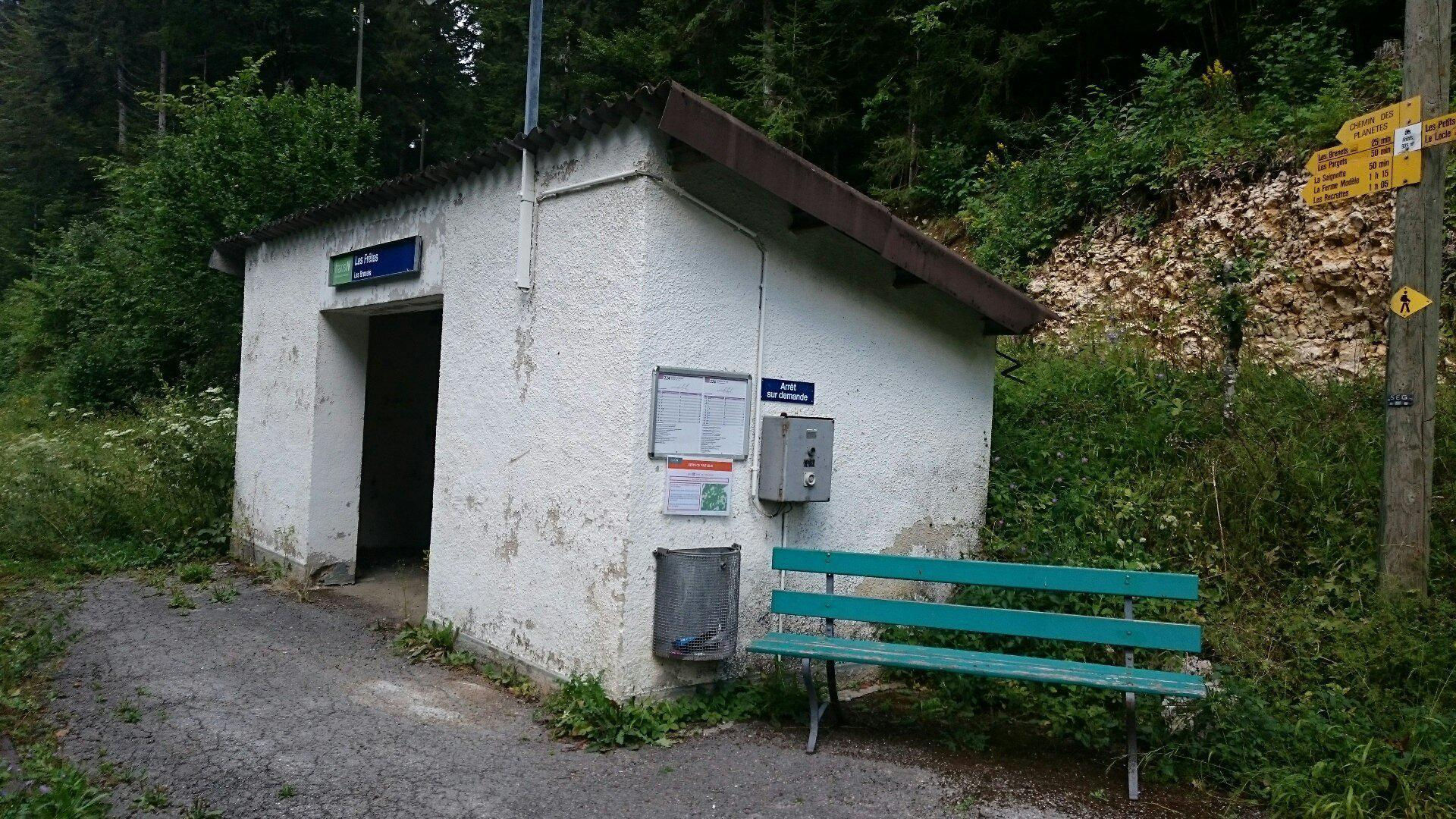
- The station in 2018

General information
- Location: Le Locle, Neuchâtel; Switzerland
- Coordinates: 47°03′31″N 6°43′33″E
- Elevation: 935 m (3,068 ft)
- Owner: Transports publics Neuchâtelois
- Line: Le Locle–Les Brenets line
- Distance: 1.6 km (0.99 mi) from Le Locle
- Platforms: 1 side platform
- Tracks: 1
- Train operators: Transports publics Neuchâtelois

Construction
- Accessible: No

Other information
- Station code: 8504391 (FRET)
- Fare zone: 21 (Onde Verte)

Services
| Preceding station | Transports publics Neuchâtelois | Following station |
|---|---|---|
| Les Brenets Terminus | R24 | Le Locle Le Chalet towards Le Locle |
Location
- Location within Switzerland Location within Canton of Neuchâtel

Les Frêtes railway station (French: Gare de Les Frêtes) is a railway station in the municipality of Le Locle, in the Swiss canton of Neuchâtel. It is located on the 1,000 mm (3 ft 3 3/8 in) Le Locle–Les Brenets line of the Transports publics Neuchâtelois.

== Services ==
As of the December 2024 timetable change, the following services stop at Les Frêtes:

- Regio: hourly or better service between Le Locle and Les Brenets.
