= Le Locle-Col-des-Roches railway station =

Railway station in Le Locle, Switzerland

Le Locle-Col-des-Roches
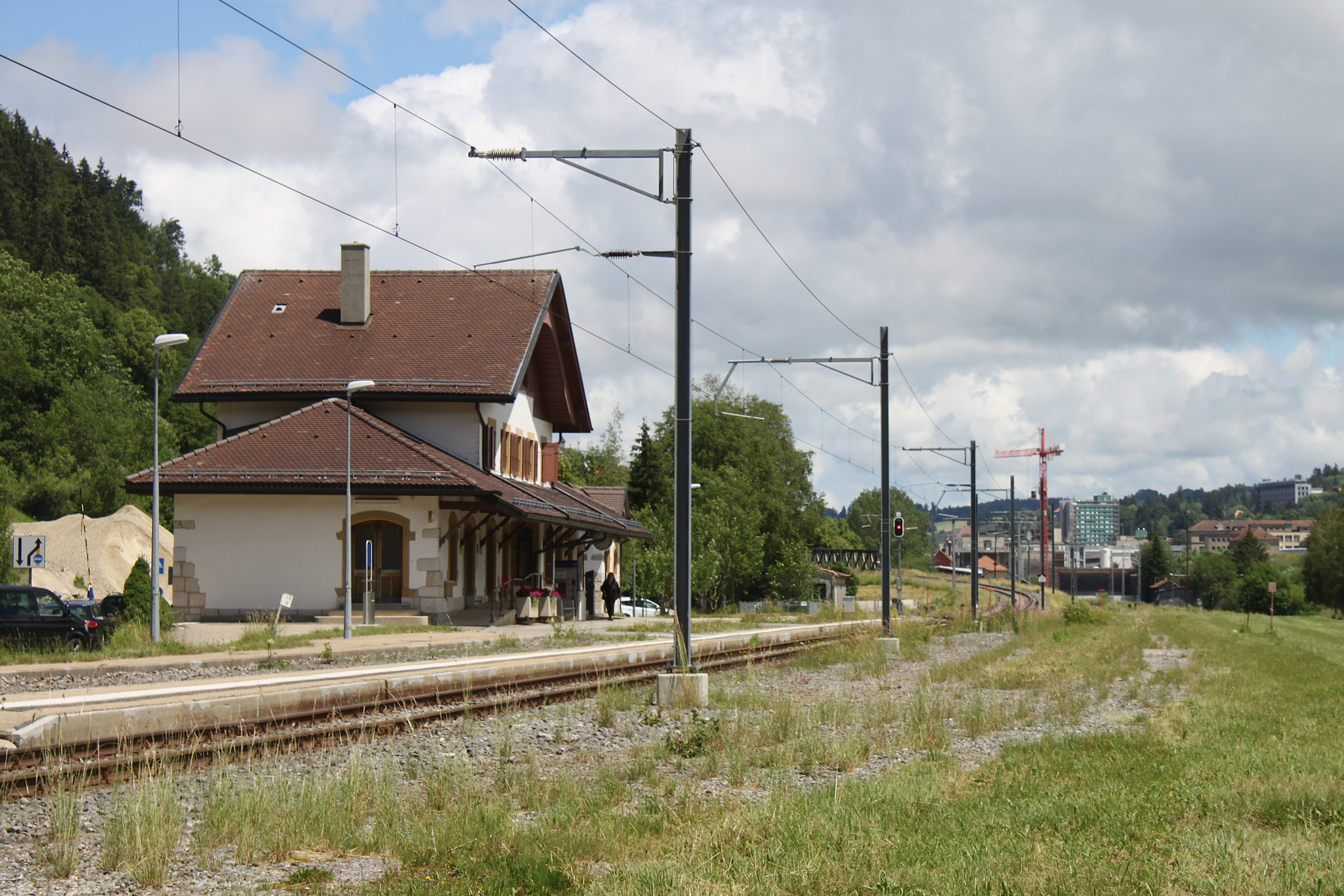
- The station in 2020

General information
- Location: Le Locle; Switzerland
- Coordinates: 47°03′00″N 6°43′34″E
- Elevation: 917 m (3,009 ft)
- Owner: Swiss Federal Railways
- Lines: Besançon–Le Locle line; Neuchâtel–Le Locle-Col-des-Roches line
- Distance: 38.9 km (24.2 mi) from Neuchâtel
- Platforms: 1 side platform
- Tracks: 1
- Train operators: SNCF
- Connections: CarPostal SA buses

Construction
- Parking: Yes (13 spaces)
- Accessible: No

Other information
- Station code: 8504317 (COL)
- Fare zone: 20 (Onde Verte)

Passengers
- 2023: 430 per weekday (SBB)

Services
Preceding station	TER Bourgogne-Franche-Comté	Following station
Morteau towards Besançon	TER	Le Locle towards La Chaux-de-Fonds
Location
- Location within Switzerland Location within Canton of Neuchâtel

Le Locle-Col-des-Roches railway station (French: Gare du Locle-Col des Roches) is a railway station in the municipality of Le Locle, in the Swiss canton of Neuchâtel. It is located at the junction of the standard gauge Neuchâtel–Le Locle-Col-des-Roches line of Swiss Federal Railways and the Besançon–Le Locle line of SNCF. The station is located just short of the border between France and Switzerland and is served by French trains only.

== Services ==
As of the December 2024 timetable change, the following services stop at Le Locle-Col-des-Roches:

- TER: infrequent service between La Chaux-de-Fonds and Morteau or Besançon-Viotte.
