= Les Deurres railway station =

Railway station in Neuchâtel, Switzerland

Les Deurres
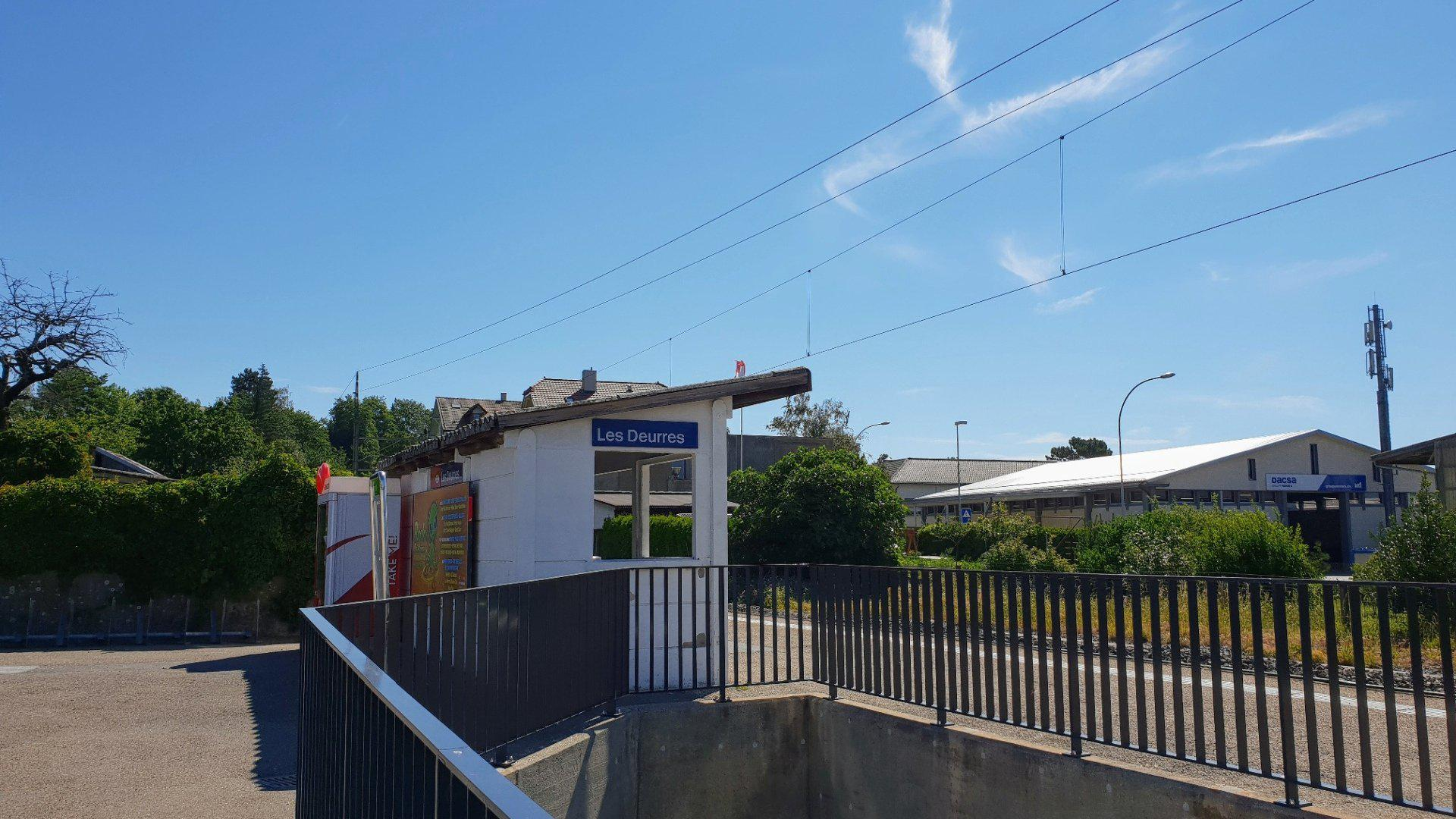
- The station platform in 2018

General information
- Location: Neuchâtel; Switzerland
- Coordinates: 46°59′08″N 6°53′57″E
- Elevation: 510 m (1,670 ft)
- Owner: Swiss Federal Railways
- Line: Neuchâtel–Le Locle-Col-des-Roches line
- Distance: 3.1 km (1.9 mi) from Neuchâtel
- Platforms: 1 side platform
- Tracks: 1
- Train operators: Swiss Federal Railways

Construction
- Parking: None available
- Accessible: Yes

Other information
- Station code: 8504231 (DEU)
- Fare zone: 10 (Onde Verte)

Passengers
- 2023: 580 per weekday (SBB)

Services
Preceding station	SBB CFF FFS	Following station
Corcelles-Peseux Terminus	R23	Neuchâtel Terminus
Location
- Location within Switzerland Location within Canton of Neuchâtel

Les Deurres railway station (French: Gare des Deurres) is a railway station in the municipality of Neuchâtel, in the Swiss canton of Neuchâtel. It is an intermediate stop on the standard gauge Neuchâtel–Le Locle-Col-des-Roches line of Swiss Federal Railways.

== Services ==
As of the December 2024 timetable change, the following services stop at Les Deurres:

- Regio: half-hourly service between Neuchâtel and Corcelles-Peseux.
