= Besançon–Le Locle railway line =

Railway line in France and Switzerland

Besançon–Le Locle
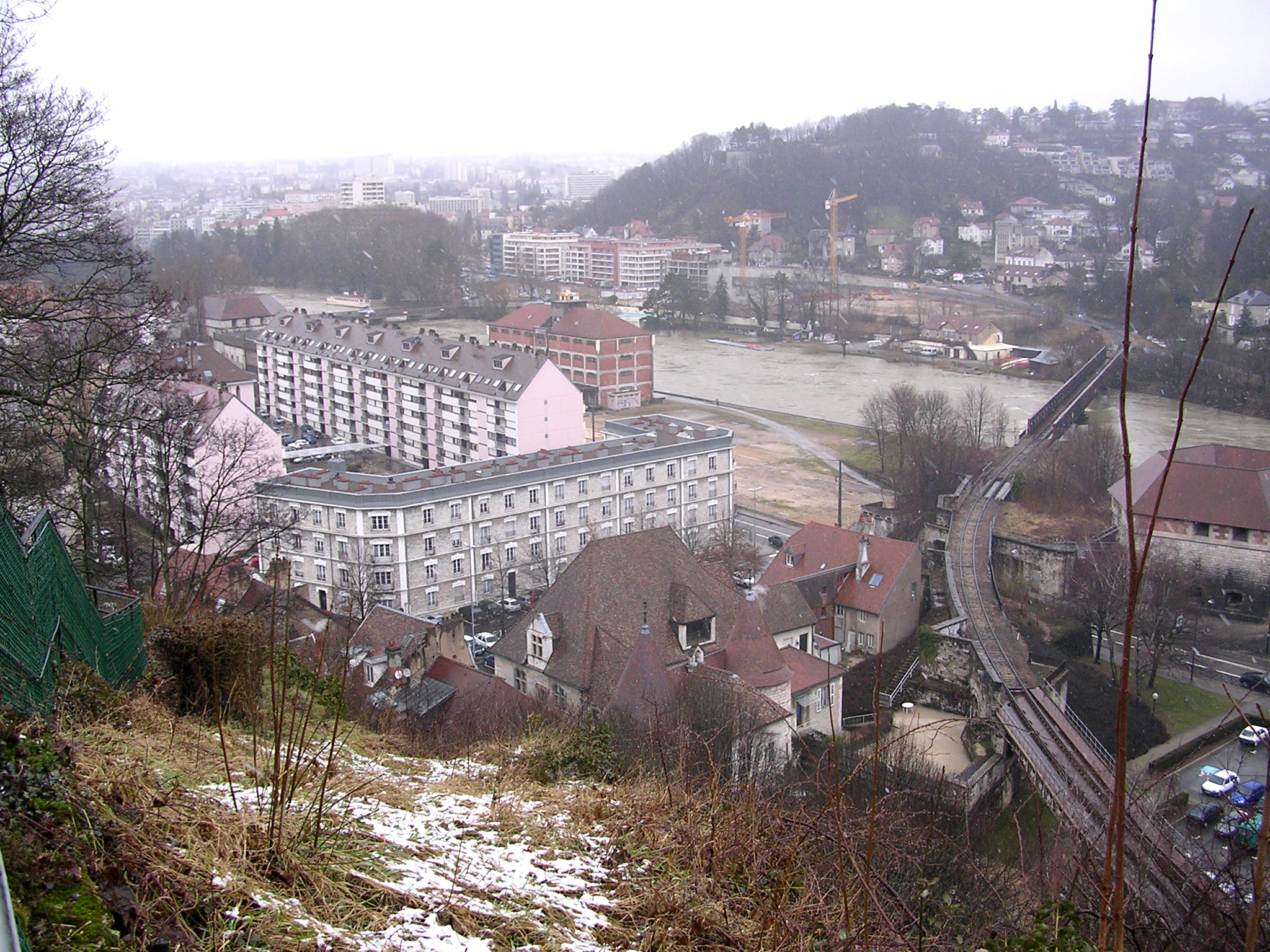
- The line crosses the Doubs beneath the Citadel of Besançon

Overview
- Owner: SNCF
- Line number: 872000
- Termini: Besançon-Viotte; Le Locle-Col-des-Roches
- Stations: 11

Service
- Services: TER Bourgogne-Franche-Comté

Technical
- Line length: 75.9 km (47.2 mi)
- Track gauge: 1,435 mm (4 ft 8 1/2 in) standard gauge

The Besançon–Le Locle railway line is a standard gauge railway line in the region of Bourgogne-Franche-Comté in France. A small section of the line extends into the canton of Neuchâtel in Switzerland. It runs 75.9 kilometres (47.2 mi) from a junction with the Neuchâtel–Le Locle-Col-des-Roches line at Le Locle-Col-des-Roches west to Besançon-Viotte, where it meets two other lines. SNCF owns and operates the line.

== Operation ==
TER Bourgogne-Franche-Comté operates passenger services over the line. The majority of trains operate between Besançon-Viotte and Le Valdahon; some continue east from Le Valdahon to La Chaux-de-Fonds in Switzerland. Swiss trains do not operate west of Le Locle.
