= Neuchâtel–Le Locle-Col-des-Roches railway =

Railway line in Switzerland

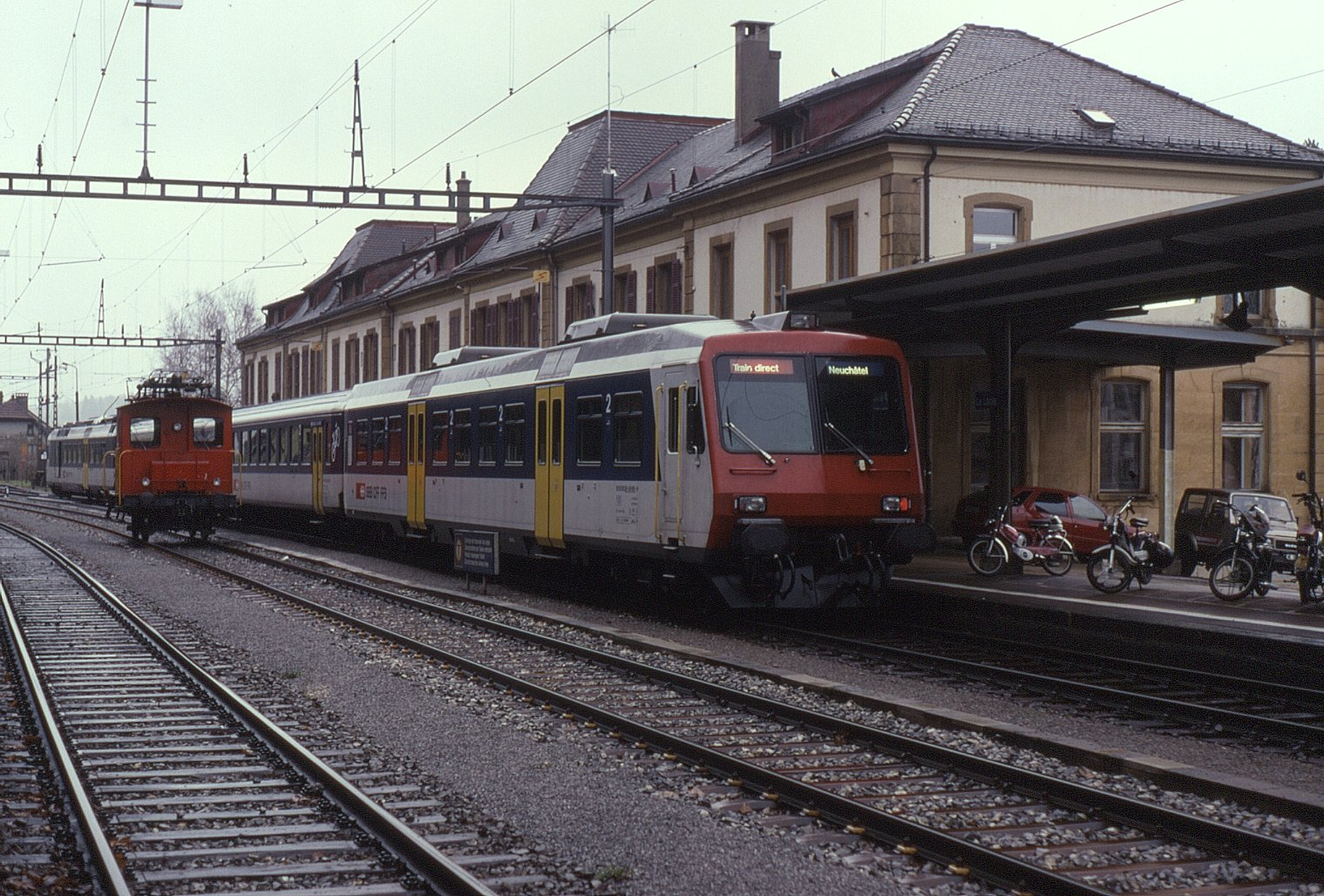
- NPZ set in Le Locle station

Overview
- Owner: Swiss Federal Railways
- Line number: 223
- Termini: Le Locle-Col-des-Roches; La Chaux-de-Fonds

Technical
- Line length: 38.21 km (23.74 mi)
- Number of tracks: 1
- Track gauge: 1,435 mm (4 ft 8 1/2 in)
- Electrification: 15 kV 16.7 Hz AC overhead catenary
- Maximum incline: 3.1%

The Neuchâtel–Le Locle-Col-des-Roches railway is a single-track standard-gauge line of the Swiss Federal Railways (SBB).

== History ==
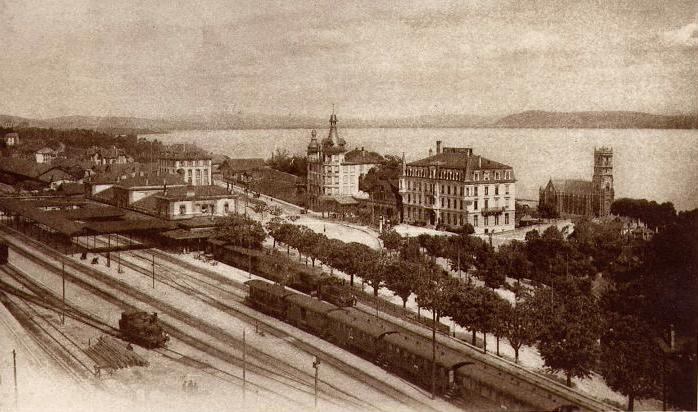
Neuchâtel station in about 1897

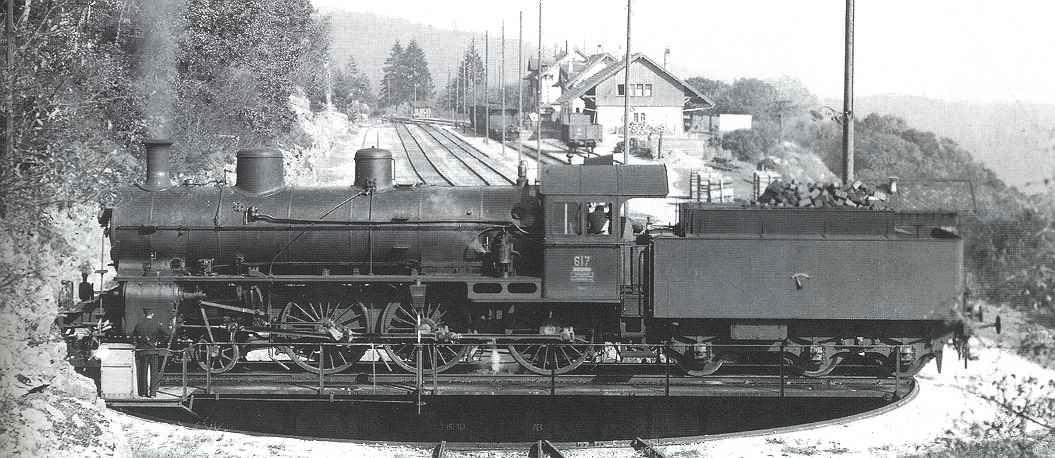
The steam locomotives had to be turned on the turntable in Chambrelien station.

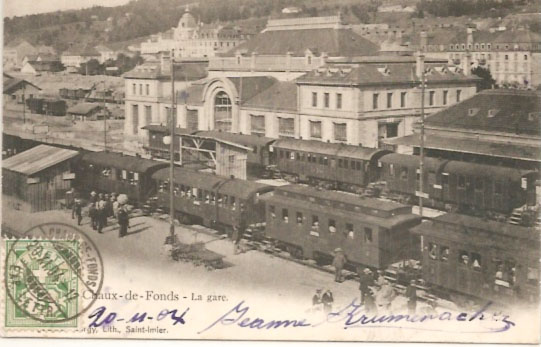
La Chaux-de-Fonds station, 1904

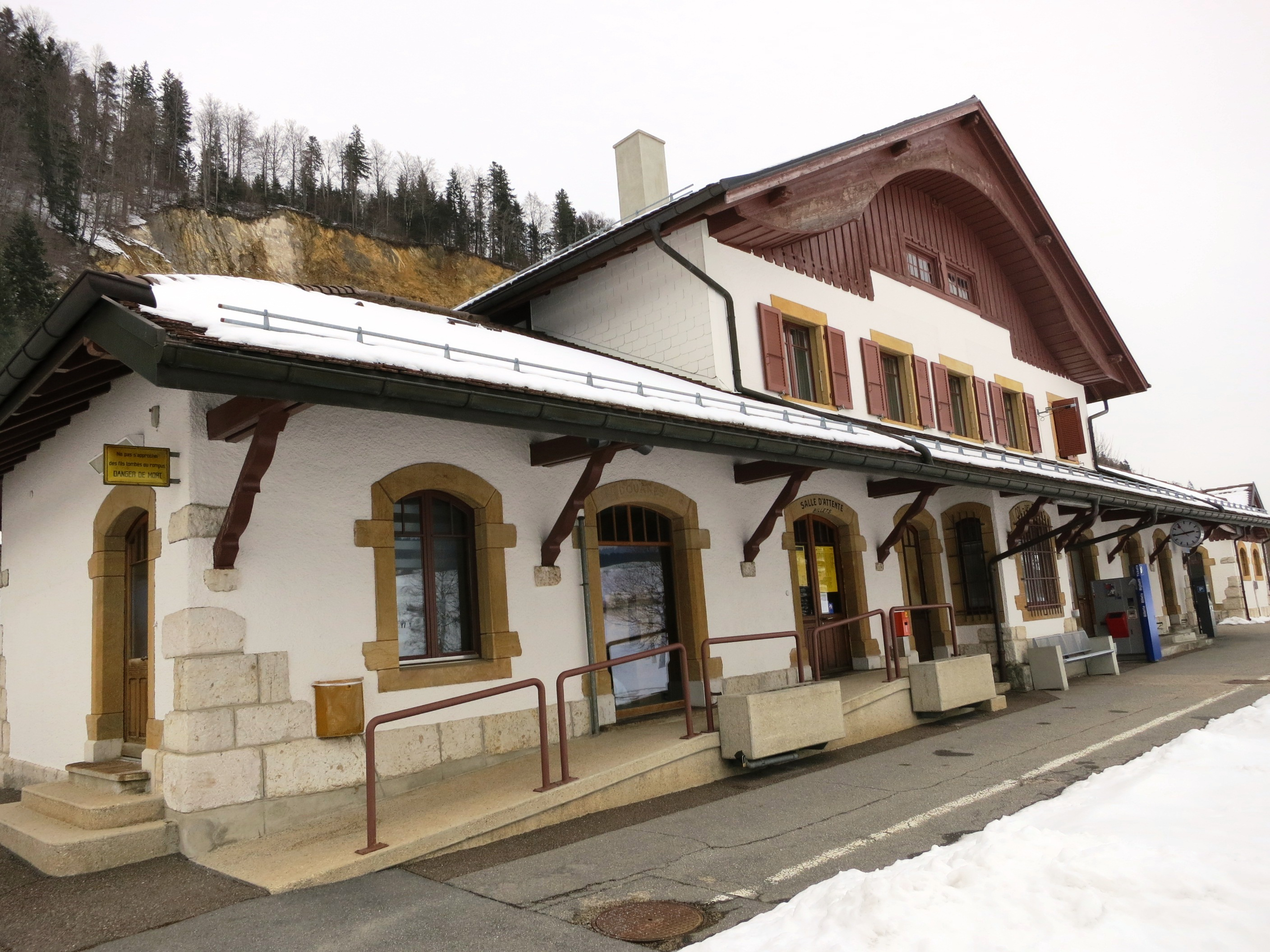
Col-des-Roches is the last station in Switzerland.

The line from Neuchâtel to La Chaux-de-Fonds, continuing to Le Locle, was built in four stages between 1857 and 1860 by the Jura industriel (Jura industrial, JI). The JI was taken over in 1875 by the Jura bernois (Bernese Jura Railway, JB), which changed its name to the Jura–Bern–Luzern-Bahn (JBL) in 1884. The JBL extended the railway to the France–Switzerland border at Le Locle-Col-des-Roches (then Brenets-Col-des-Roches) and connected it through the Col des Roches tunnel and the line to Besançon with the French railway network of the Paris-Lyon-Méditerrané (PLM) company.

On 1 January 1886, the 38.21-kilometre-long Neuchâtel–Le Locle-Col-des-Roches railway line was separated from the Jura-Bern-Luzern-Bahn (JBL) and integrated into the newly founded Jura neuchâtelois (JN), which was taken over by the canton of Neuchâtel.

The Confederation bought the railway from the canton and incorporated it in the network of the Swiss Federal Railways (SBB) on 1 July 1913. The SBB electrified the line to Le Locle-Col des Roches at 15 kV 16 2/3 Hz AC in 1931. The extension of the line through France is not electrified.

== Route description ==
Shortly out of Neuchâtel, the line to Le Locle separates from the line to Lausanne and, after a short tunnel, arrives at Les Deurres and Corcelles-Peseux stations. Trains continue to climb rapidly and travellers can enjoy the panorama over Lake Neuchâtel. Trains have to reverse in Chambrelien station to continue their way. Since the SBB only uses push–pull trains on this line, it is no longer necessary to change locomotives. After the change of direction, the trains continue to gain height and run to Les Geneveys-sur-Coffrane. After the large village of Les Hauts-Geneveys, trains pass through Les Loges and Mont-Sagne tunnels. After the second tunnel, the line runs parallel with the narrow gauge line from Les Ponts-de-Martel. Shortly before La Chaux-de-Fonds, the lines from Neuchâtel and Biel/Bienne run next to each other through separate tunnels to the station.

The section between La-Chaux-de-Fonds and Le Locle, which is only 8-kilometre-long, used to have several stations, but they have been closed over time. However, Le Crêt-du-Locle station was reopened in August 2007. Most trains from La Chaux-de-Fonds terminate at Le Locle, where the narrow-gauge Transports publics Neuchâtelois connects to Les Brenets. The few diesel railcars, which continue to France, run down a steep incline and cross a steel bridge to Locle-Col-des-Roches station. They then run through the Col des Roches tunnel, in the middle of which is the national border.

== Transrun ==
On 23 September 2012, Neuchâtel voters narrowly rejected the so-called Transrun project, a direct S-Bahn connection between Neuchâtel and La Chaux-de-Fonds. The railway, which would have cost about CHF 1 billion, would have removed the difficult zig-zag in Chambrelien, shortened the line from 29.5 to 16.7 kilometres and reduced the travel time of 27 minutes in half. This would have required the construction of a 6.2-km-long tunnel through the Chaumont ridge and a 5.7-km-long tunnel under the Vue des Alpes. Trains would have crossed In the intervening open section at a station in Cernier.

== Operations ==
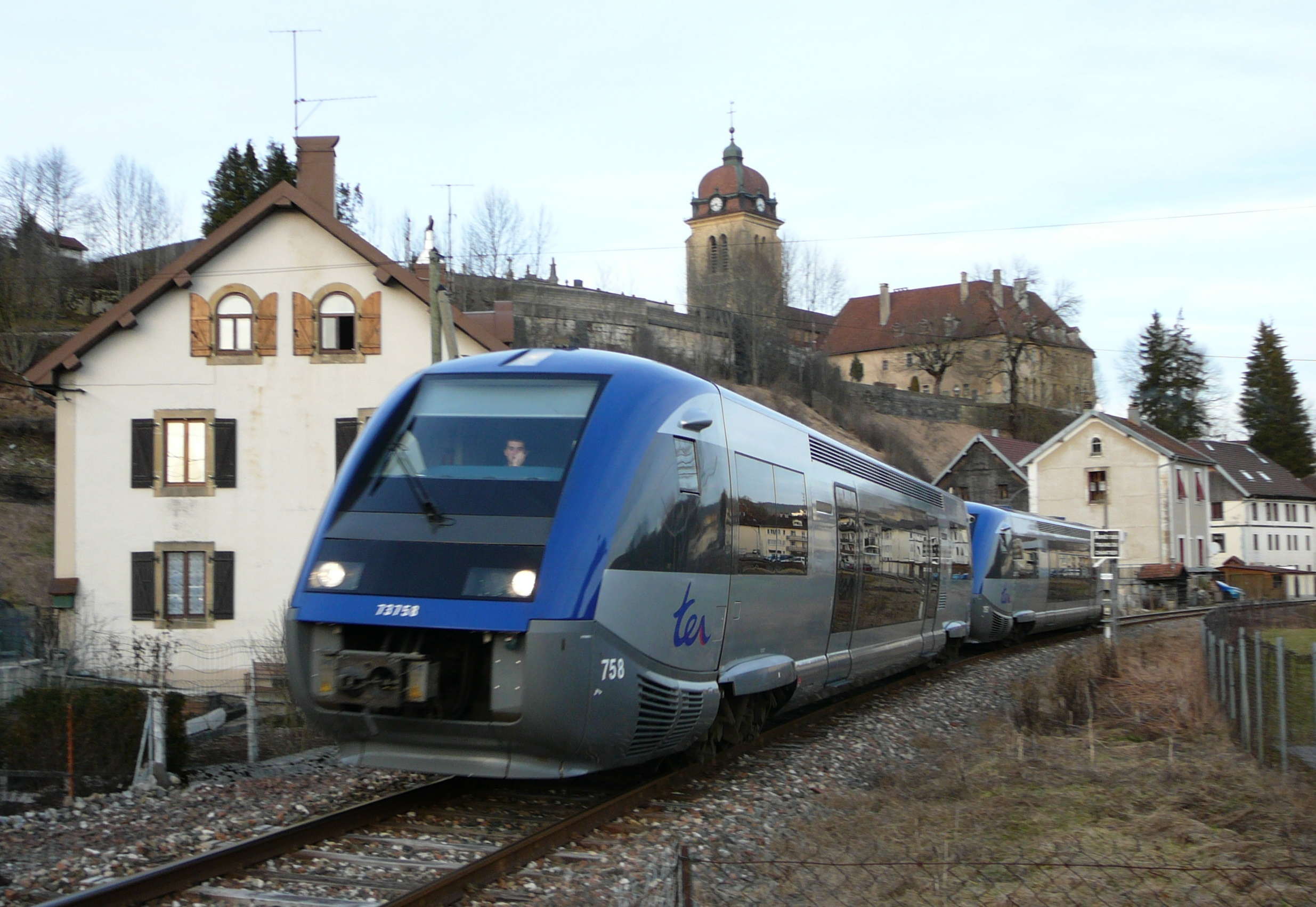
French diesel railcars run on La Chaux-de-Fonds–Le Locle–Morteau line.

Since 13 December 2015, a RegioExpress and a Regio service have run every hour between Neuchâtel and La Chaux-de-Fonds through the stations of Corcelles-Peseux, Chambrelien and Les Geneveys-sur-Coffrane at exactly half-hour intervals. The RE trains run between Bern and La Chaux-de-Fonds. There are operated with EW III push-pull trains of the BLS powered by class Re 465 locomotives. Regional trains continue via La Chaux-de-Fonds to Le Locle. As part of this timetable change service ended at Montmollin-Montezillon, while a rail shuttle operates between Neuchâtel and Corcelles-Peseux.

Between La Chaux-de-Fonds and Le Locle, the service is complemented by a second hourly regional service. The stops in the lower section are served by half-hour Regio services on the Neuchâtel–Corcelles-Peseux route. These services are operated with two RABe 524 (TILO-FLIRT) railcars of the SBB and an RABe 527 of the Neuchâtel public transport operator, Transports Publics Neuchâtelois (transN).

Between La Chaux-de-Fonds and Morteau, diesel railcars are operated for frontier workers (4 trains per day from La Chaux-de-Fonds, 6 in the opposite direction) in the morning and afternoon; these also serve the border railway station at Le Locle-Col-des-Roches. The route is served by X 73500 sets that were purchased by the Franche-Comté region.
