= Courtemaîche railway station =

Railway station in Basse-Allaine, Switzerland

Courtemaîche
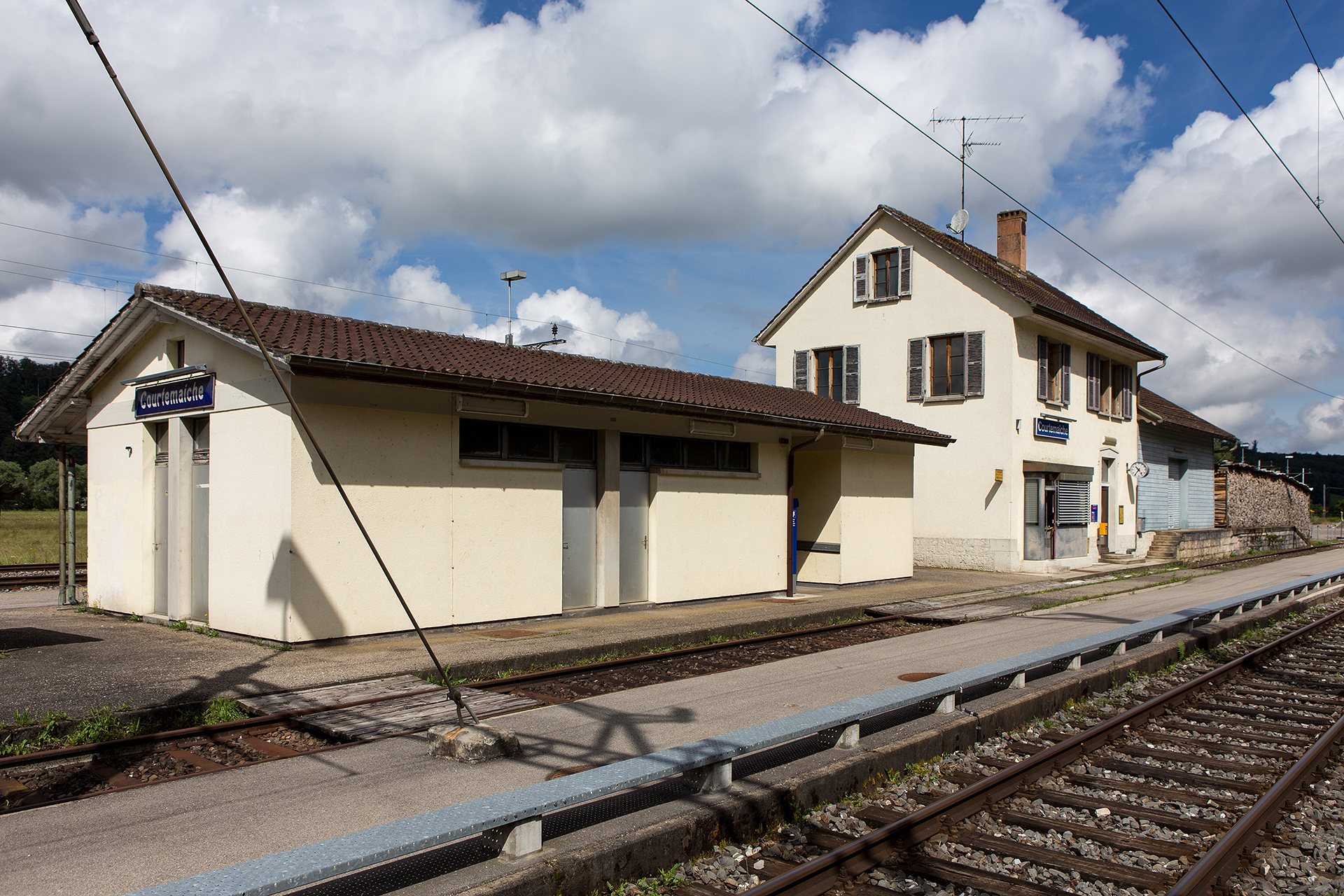
- The station in 2016

General information
- Location: Basse-Allaine; Switzerland
- Coordinates: 47°27′21″N 7°03′19″E
- Elevation: 397 m (1,302 ft)
- Owner: Swiss Federal Railways
- Line: Delémont–Delle line
- Distance: 118.0 km (73.3 mi) from Olten
- Platforms: 2: 1 side platform; 1 island platform
- Tracks: 4
- Train operators: Swiss Federal Railways
- Connections: CarPostal SA bus line

Construction
- Cycle facilities: Yes (10 spaces)
- Accessible: No

Other information
- Station code: 8500127 (CTM)
- Fare zone: 22 (Vagabond)

Passengers
- 2023: 150 per weekday (SBB)

Services
Preceding station	RER Jura	Following station
Buix towards Delle	R1	Courchavon towards Delémont
Buix towards Delle	R11	Courchavon towards Porrentruy
Location
- Location within Switzerland Location within Canton of Jura

Courtemaîche railway station (French: Gare de Courtemaîche) is a railway station in the municipality of Basse-Allaine, in the Swiss canton of Jura. It is an intermediate stop on the standard gauge Delémont–Delle line of Swiss Federal Railways.

== Services ==
As of the December 2025 timetable change, the following services stop at Courtemaîche:

- RER Jura: half-hourly service to Delle and Porrentruy and hourly service to Delémont.
