= Buix railway station =

Railway station in Basse-Allaine, Switzerland

Buix
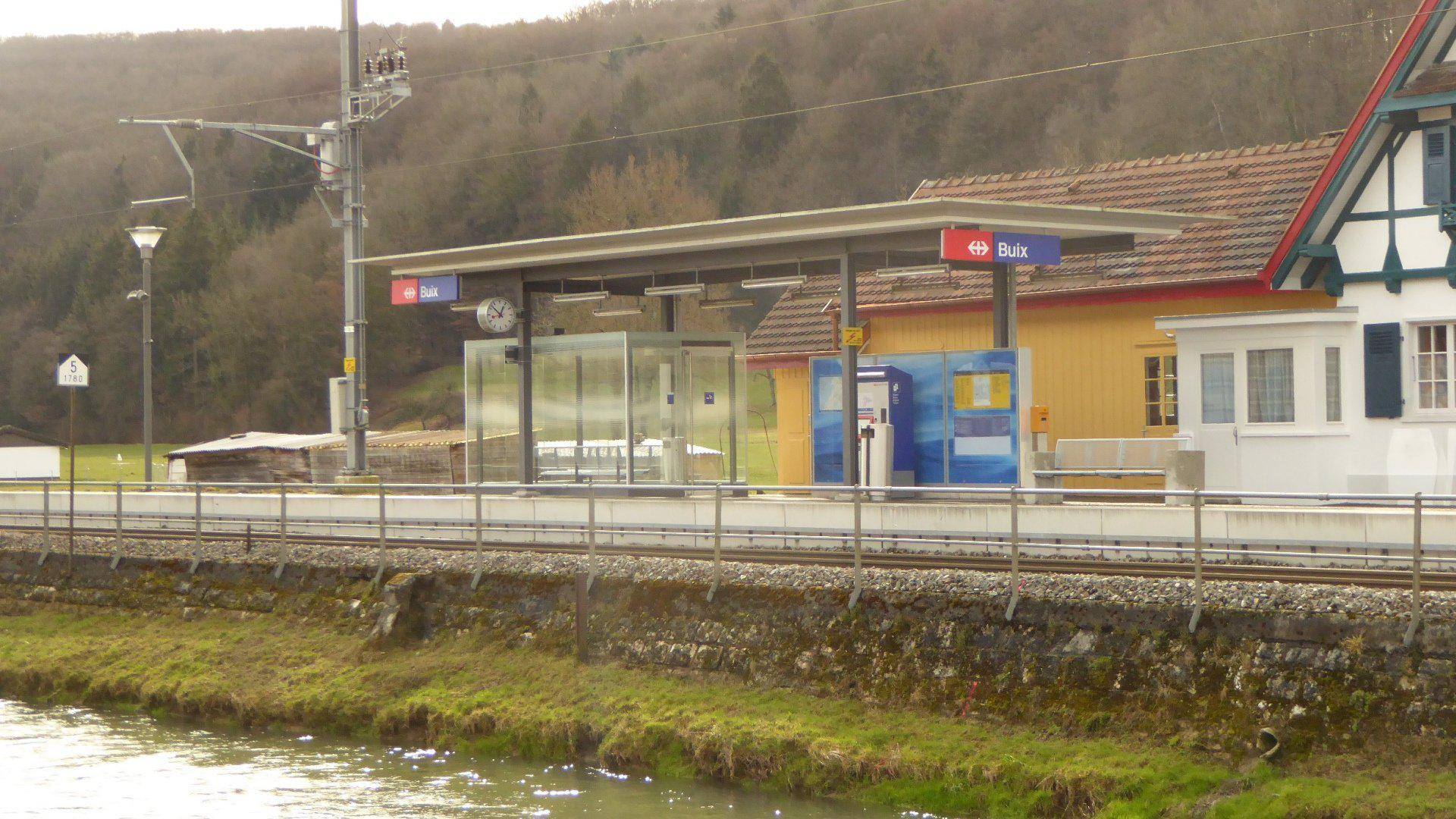
- The station platform in 2018

General information
- Location: Basse-Allaine; Switzerland
- Coordinates: 47°28′46″N 7°01′48″E
- Elevation: 386 m (1,266 ft)
- Owner: Swiss Federal Railways
- Line: Delémont–Delle line
- Distance: 121.5 km (75.5 mi) from Olten
- Platforms: 1 side platform
- Tracks: 1
- Train operators: Swiss Federal Railways

Construction
- Parking: None
- Cycle facilities: Yes (5 spaces)
- Accessible: Yes

Other information
- Station code: 8500144 (BX)
- Fare zone: 22 (Vagabond)

Passengers
- 2023: 100 per weekday (SBB)

Services
Preceding station	RER Jura	Following station
Boncourt towards Delle	R1	Courtemaîche towards Delémont
Boncourt towards Delle	R11	Courtemaîche towards Porrentruy
Location
- Location within Switzerland Location within Canton of Jura

Buix railway station (French: Gare de Buix) is a railway station in the municipality of Basse-Allaine, in the Swiss canton of Jura. It is an intermediate stop on the standard gauge Delémont–Delle line of Swiss Federal Railways.

== Services ==
As of the December 2025 timetable change, the following services stop at Buix:

- RER Jura: half-hourly service to Delle and Porrentruy and hourly service to Delémont.
