= Le Remontoir (Le Locle) =

Inclined elevator in Le Locle, Neuchâtel, Switzerland

Coordinates: 47.057201°N 6.746091°E

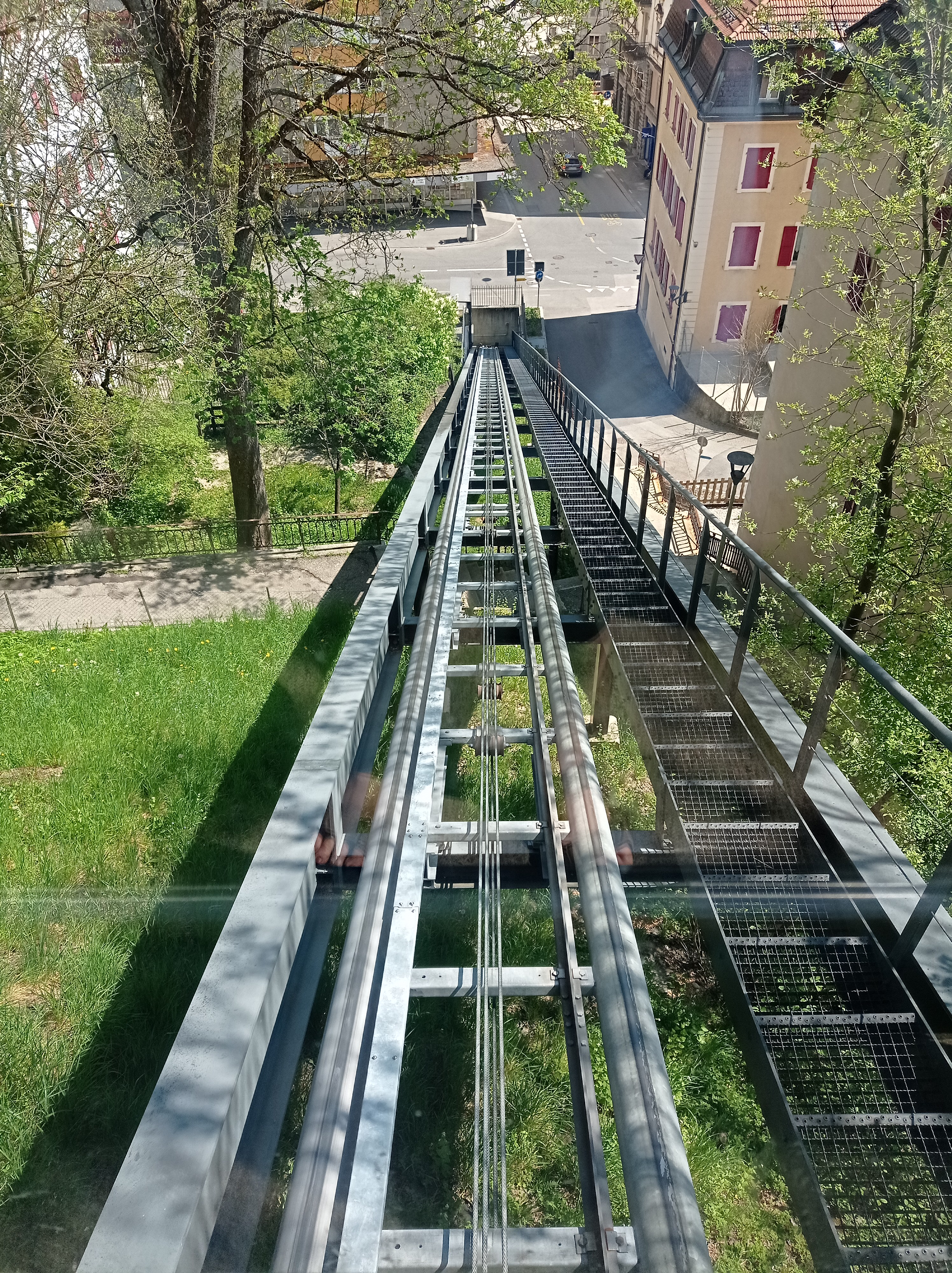

Overview
- Status: In operation
- Owner: City of Le Locle
- Locale: Le Locle, Switzerland
- Termini: "Centre-Ville" at Rue de la Côte / Sidmouth's Square; "Gare"
- Stations: 2

Service
- Type: Funicular (inclined elevator)
- Rolling stock: 1 for 16 persons
- Ridership: 1,117,068 runs (2015–2020)

History
- Opened: 1 September 2014 (11 years ago)
- Tower project: 2010
- Inauguration: 13 June 2015

Technical
- Line length: 62 m (203 ft)
- Number of tracks: 1
- Electrification: from opening
- Highest elevation: 946 m (3,104 ft)

Le Remontoir is a funicular-like inclined elevator in Le Locle, Switzerland. It links the town's centre with Le Locle railway station located above. With a length of 62 m, it climbs a difference of elevation of 24 m. The lower station is located in Rue de la Côte at a small square named Sidmouth's Square.

== History ==
When the railway line from Neuchatel to Le Locle was built in 1857, the current, off-centre site of the railway station was chosen for cost reason. It was maintained for the current station building of 1883. Projects in the 20th century sought to improve access.

In 2010, the city unanimously approved funding for a project of two elevator towers linking the centre to the railway station. Following concerns about its impact on the cityscape of the World Heritage site, Federal Office of Culture mandated Diener & Diener for an alternative. The resulting project with an inclined elevator was compared to Polybahn. The necessary additional funding was approved in 2012.

The elevator was built by Inauen-Schätti. It is named after the remontoir.

The elevator was opened to the public on 1 September 2014 and officially inaugurated on 13 June 2015.

By 2016, it made an average of 530 runs per day. There were 30 technical incidents in 2015.

In 2016, the square at the lower station was named Sidmouth's Square.

The 187,000 runs in 2018 represented 12,061 km.
