= Courchavon railway station =

Railway station in Courchavon, Switzerland

Courchavon
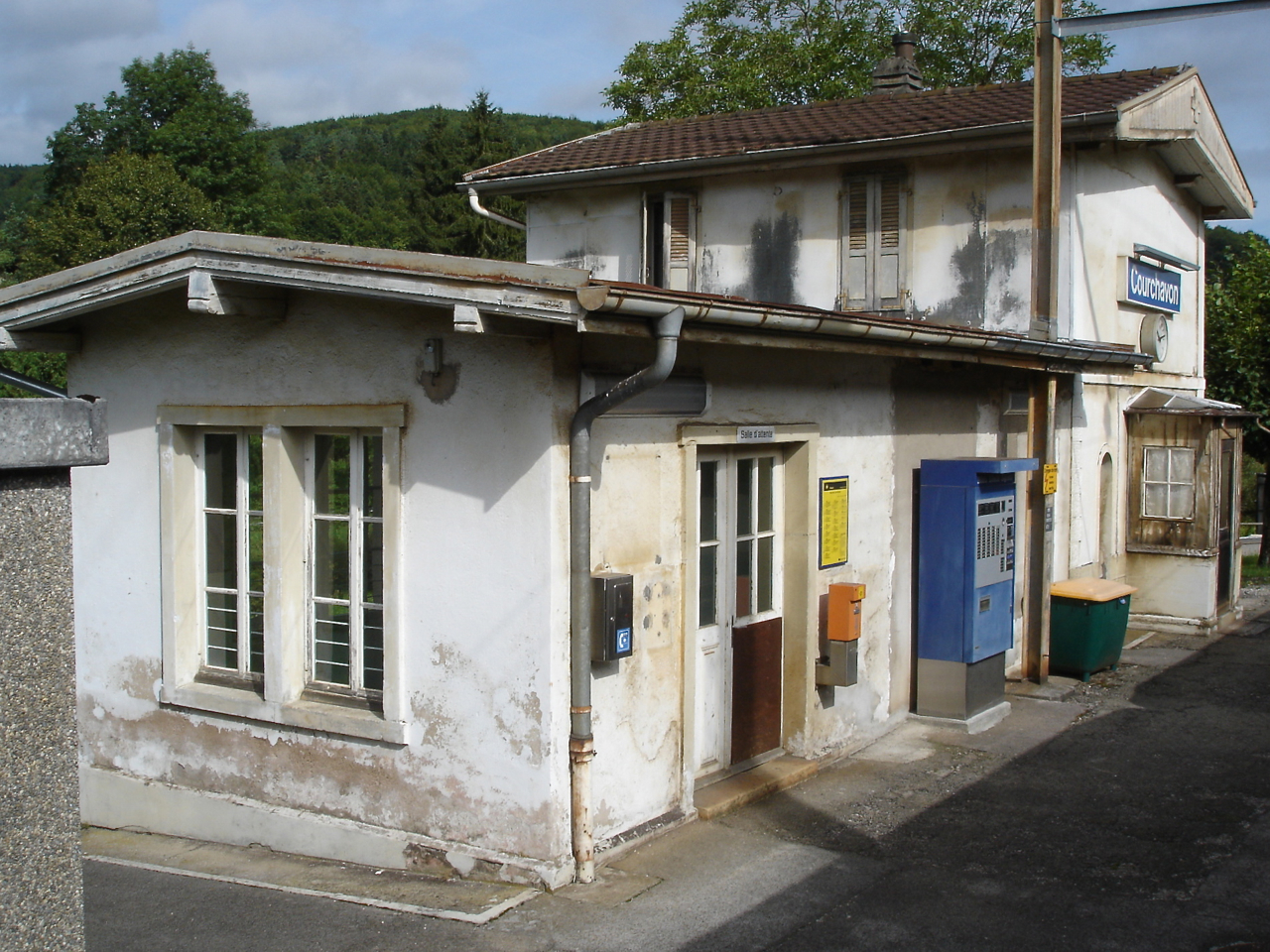
- The station building in 2008

General information
- Location: Courchavon; Switzerland
- Coordinates: 47°26′23″N 7°03′28″E
- Elevation: 406 m (1,332 ft)
- Owner: Swiss Federal Railways
- Line: Delémont–Delle line
- Distance: 116.1 km (72.1 mi) from Olten
- Platforms: 1 side platform
- Tracks: 1
- Train operators: Swiss Federal Railways

Construction
- Parking: None
- Accessible: Partly

Other information
- Station code: 8500141 (CCH)
- Fare zone: 20 (Vagabond)

Passengers
- 2023: Less than 50 persons per day (SBB)

Services
Preceding station	RER Jura	Following station
Courtemaîche towards Delle	R1	Porrentruy towards Delémont
Courtemaîche towards Delle	R11	Porrentruy Terminus
Location
- Location within Switzerland Location within Canton of Jura

Courchavon railway station (French: Gare de Courchavon) is a railway station in the municipality of Courchavon, in the Swiss canton of Jura. It is an intermediate stop on the standard gauge Delémont–Delle line of Swiss Federal Railways.

== Services ==
As of the December 2025 timetable change, the following services stop at Courchavon:

- RER Jura: half-hourly service to Delle and Porrentruy and hourly service to Delémont.
