= Corcelles-Peseux railway station =

Railway station in Neuchâtel, Switzerland

Corcelles-Peseux
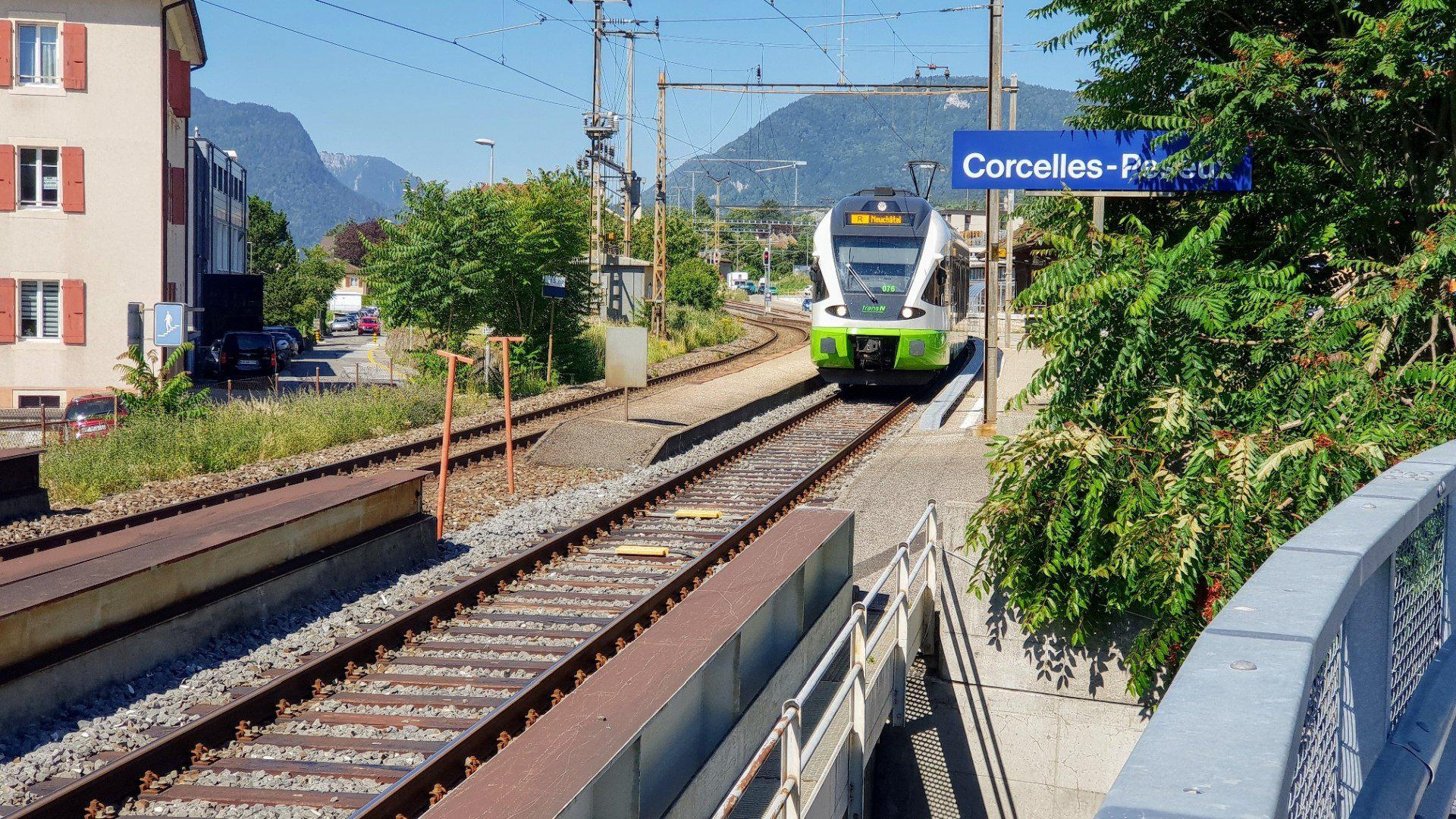
- A train at the station in 2018

General information
- Location: Neuchâtel; Switzerland
- Coordinates: 46°59′00″N 6°53′02″E
- Elevation: 531 m (1,742 ft)
- Owner: Swiss Federal Railways
- Line: Neuchâtel–Le Locle-Col-des-Roches line
- Distance: 4.3 km (2.7 mi) from Neuchâtel
- Platforms: 1 side platform
- Tracks: 2
- Train operators: Swiss Federal Railways
- Connections: Transports publics neuchâtelois buses

Construction
- Parking: Yes (13 spaces)
- Accessible: Yes

Other information
- Station code: 8504232 (CP)
- Fare zone: 10 (Onde Verte)

Passengers
- 2023: 810 per weekday (SBB)

Services
Preceding station	SBB CFF FFS	Following station
Terminus	R23	Les Deurres towards Neuchâtel
Location
- Location within Switzerland Location within Canton of Neuchâtel

Corcelles-Peseux railway station (French: Gare de Corcelles-Peseux) is a railway station in the municipality of Neuchâtel, in the Swiss canton of Neuchâtel. It is an intermediate stop on the standard gauge Neuchâtel–Le Locle-Col-des-Roches line of Swiss Federal Railways. In order to maintain half-hourly service on the line between Neuchâtel and La Chaux-de-Fonds, service from this station to Chambrelien and points west ended in December 2015, replaced by a rail shuttle to Neuchâtel.

== Services ==
As of the December 2024 timetable change, the following services stop at Corcelles-Peseux:

- Regio: half-hourly service to Neuchâtel.
