= Col des Roches =

Mountain pass on the border between Switzerland and France

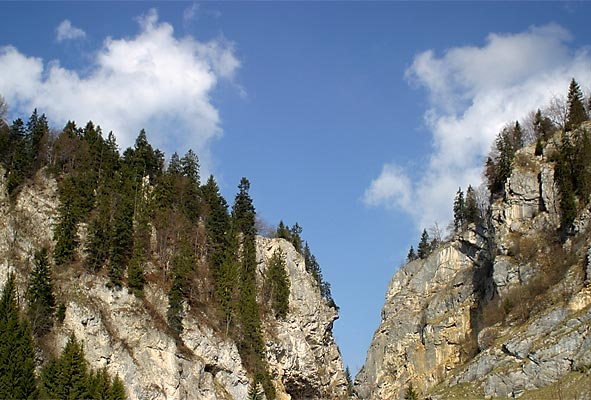
- Col des Roches

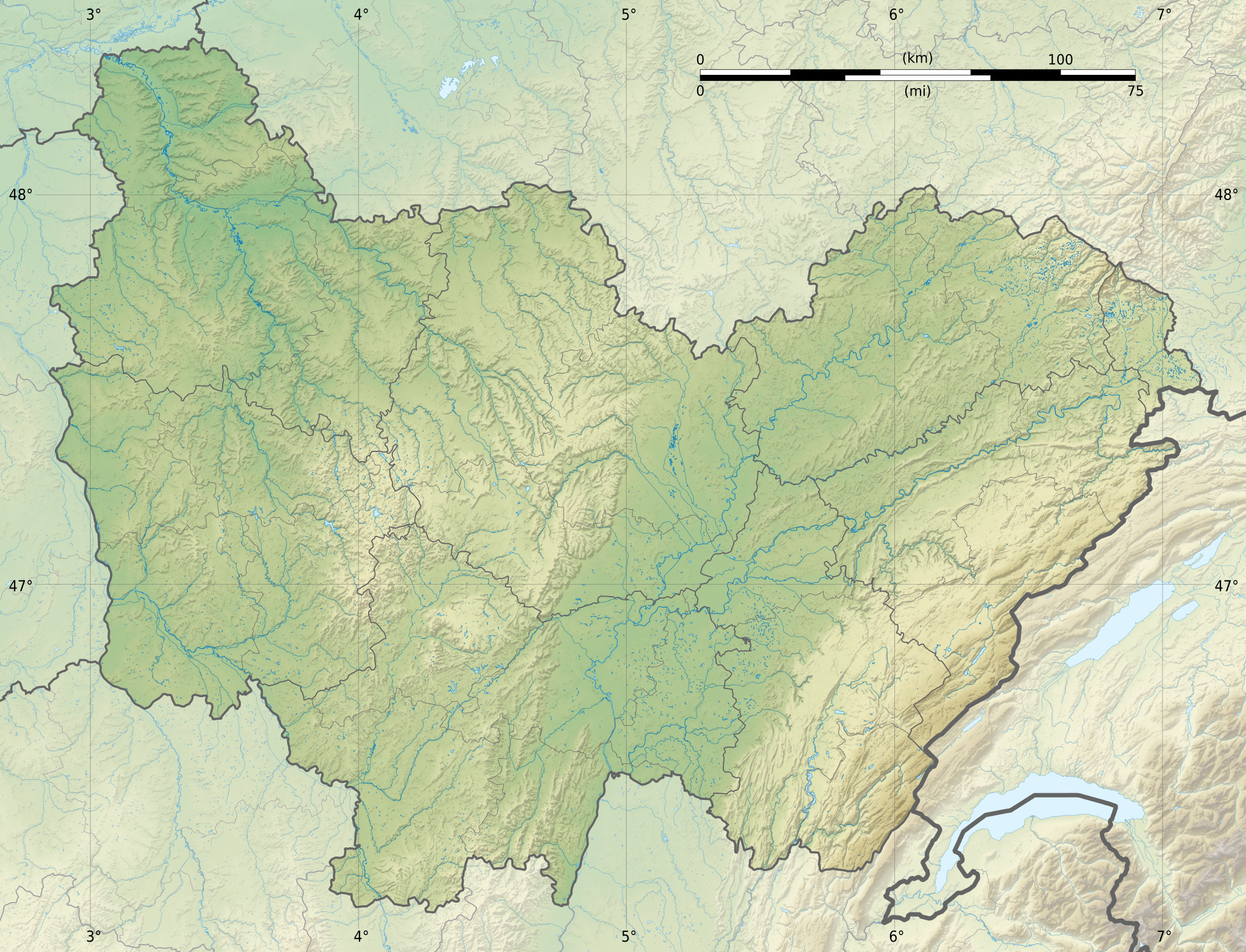
- Location within Switzerland Location within Canton of Neuchâtel Location within France Location within Bourgogne-Franche-Comté
- Elevation: 919 metres (3,015 ft)

Third Approach
- Location: France–Switzerland border
- Range: Jura Mountains
- Coordinates: 47°3′2.51″N 6°43′13.37″E

Col des Roches (919 metres [3,015 ft]) is a mountain pass in the Jura Mountains on the France–Switzerland border. It connects Le Locle in the Swiss canton of Neuchâtel with Morteau in France (department of Doubs, Bourgogne-Franche-Comté).

== Caves ==
The pass is notable for 16th century subterranean mills located in caves on the Swiss side.

== See also ==
- List of caves in Switzerland
- List of mountain passes in Switzerland
