= Les Brenets railway station =

Railway station in Le Locle, Switzerland

Les Brenets
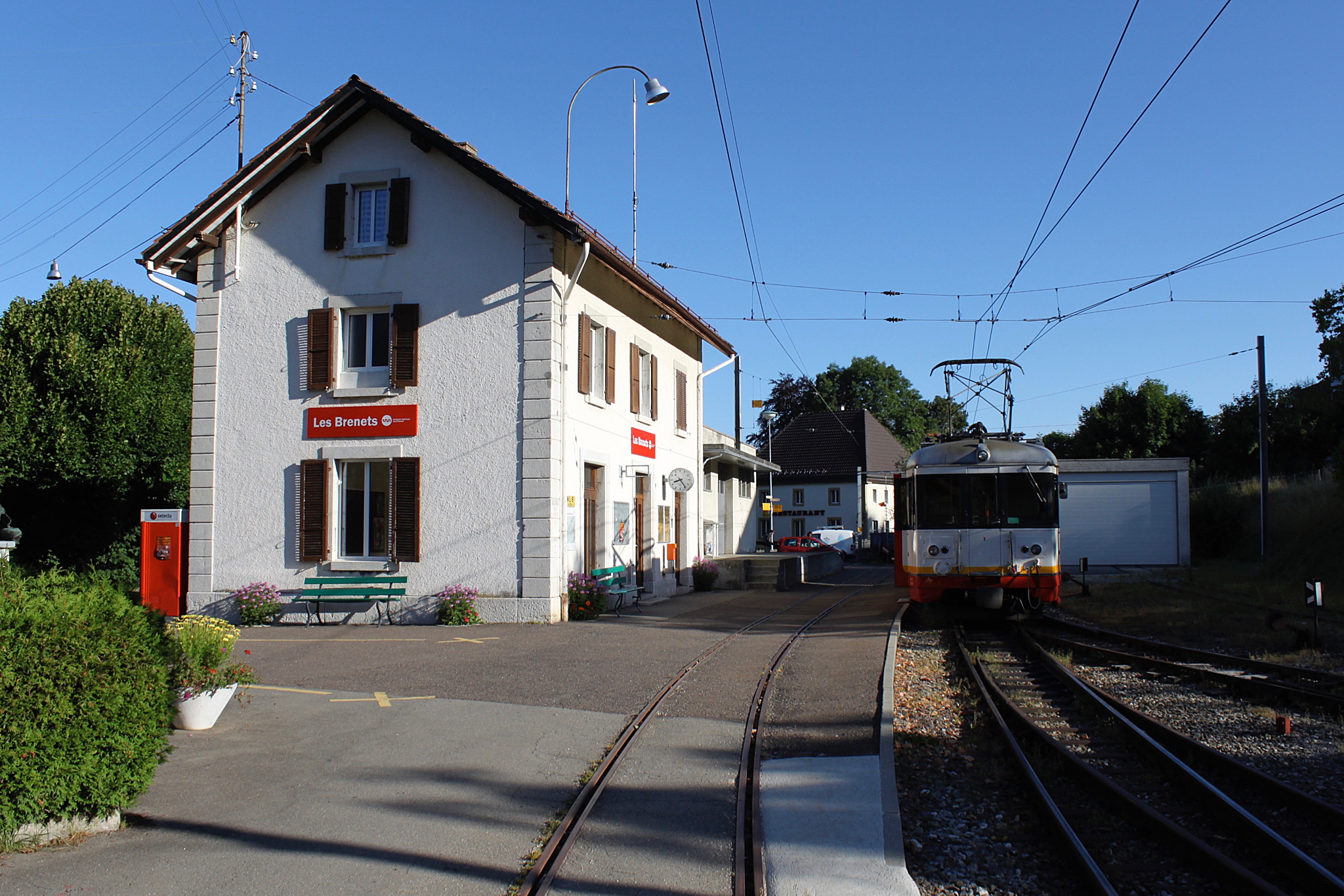
- The station in 2009

General information
- Location: Le Locle, Neuchâtel; Switzerland
- Coordinates: 47°04′02″N 6°42′27″E
- Elevation: 876 m (2,874 ft)
- Owner: Transports publics Neuchâtelois
- Line: Le Locle–Les Brenets line
- Distance: 4.1 km (2.5 mi) from Le Locle
- Platforms: 1 island platform
- Tracks: 2
- Train operators: Transports publics Neuchâtelois
- Connections: CarPostal SA bus lines

Construction
- Accessible: No

Other information
- Station code: 8504392 (BREN)
- Fare zone: 21 (Onde Verte)

Services
Preceding station	Transports publics Neuchâtelois	Following station
Terminus	R24	Les Frêtes towards Le Locle
Location
- Location within Switzerland Location within Canton of Neuchâtel

Les Brenets railway station (French: Gare des Brenets) is a railway station in the municipality of Le Locle, in the Swiss canton of Neuchâtel. It is the western terminus of the 1,000 mm (3 ft 3 3/8 in) Le Locle–Les Brenets line of the Transports publics Neuchâtelois.

== Services ==
As of the December 2024 timetable change, the following services stop at Les Brenets:

- Regio: hourly or better service to Le Locle.
