= Brémoncourt =

- Commune
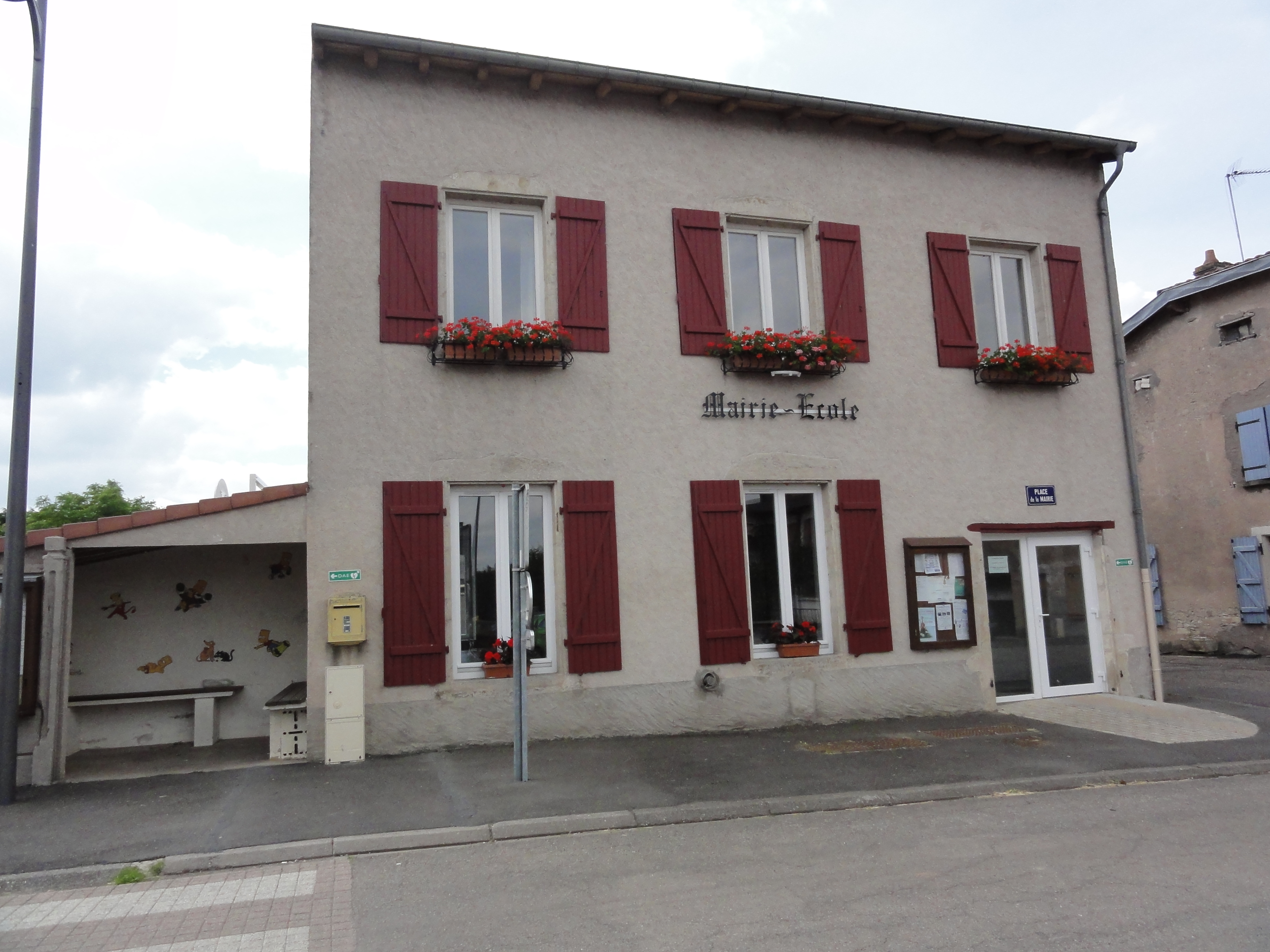
- The town hall in Brémoncourt

- Coat of arms
- Location of Brémoncourt
- Location within France Location within Grand Est
- Coordinates: 48°29′20″N 6°21′12″E
- Country: France
- Region: Grand Est
- Department: Meurthe-et-Moselle
- Arrondissement: Lunéville
- Canton: Lunéville-2
- Intercommunality: Meurthe, Mortagne, Moselle

Government
  - Mayor (2020–2026): Maurice Heriat
- Area^{1}: 5.24 km^{2} (2.02 sq mi)
- Elevation: 342 m (1,122 ft)
- Highest elevation: 403 m (1,322 ft)
- Lowest elevation: 268 m (879 ft)
- Population (2023): 166
  - Density: 31.7/km^{2} (82.0/sq mi)
- Time zone: UTC+01:00 (CET)
  - Summer (DST): UTC+02:00 (CEST)
- INSEE/Postal code: 54098 /54290
- ^{1} French Land Register data, which excludes lakes, ponds, glaciers > 1 km^{2} (0.386 sq mi or 247 acres) and river estuaries.

Brémoncourt (French pronunciation: [bʁemɔ̃kuʁ]) is a commune in the Meurthe-et-Moselle department in northeastern France.

== Population ==
Historical population
Year	Pop.	±% p.a.
1968	137	—
1975	146	+0.91%
1982	151	+0.48%
1990	144	−0.59%
1999	147	+0.23%
2007	155	+0.66%
2012	152	−0.39%
2017	167	+1.90%
2023	166	−0.10%
Source: INSEE

== See also ==
- Communes of the Meurthe-et-Moselle department
