= Boncourt railway station =

Railway station in Boncourt, Switzerland

Boncourt
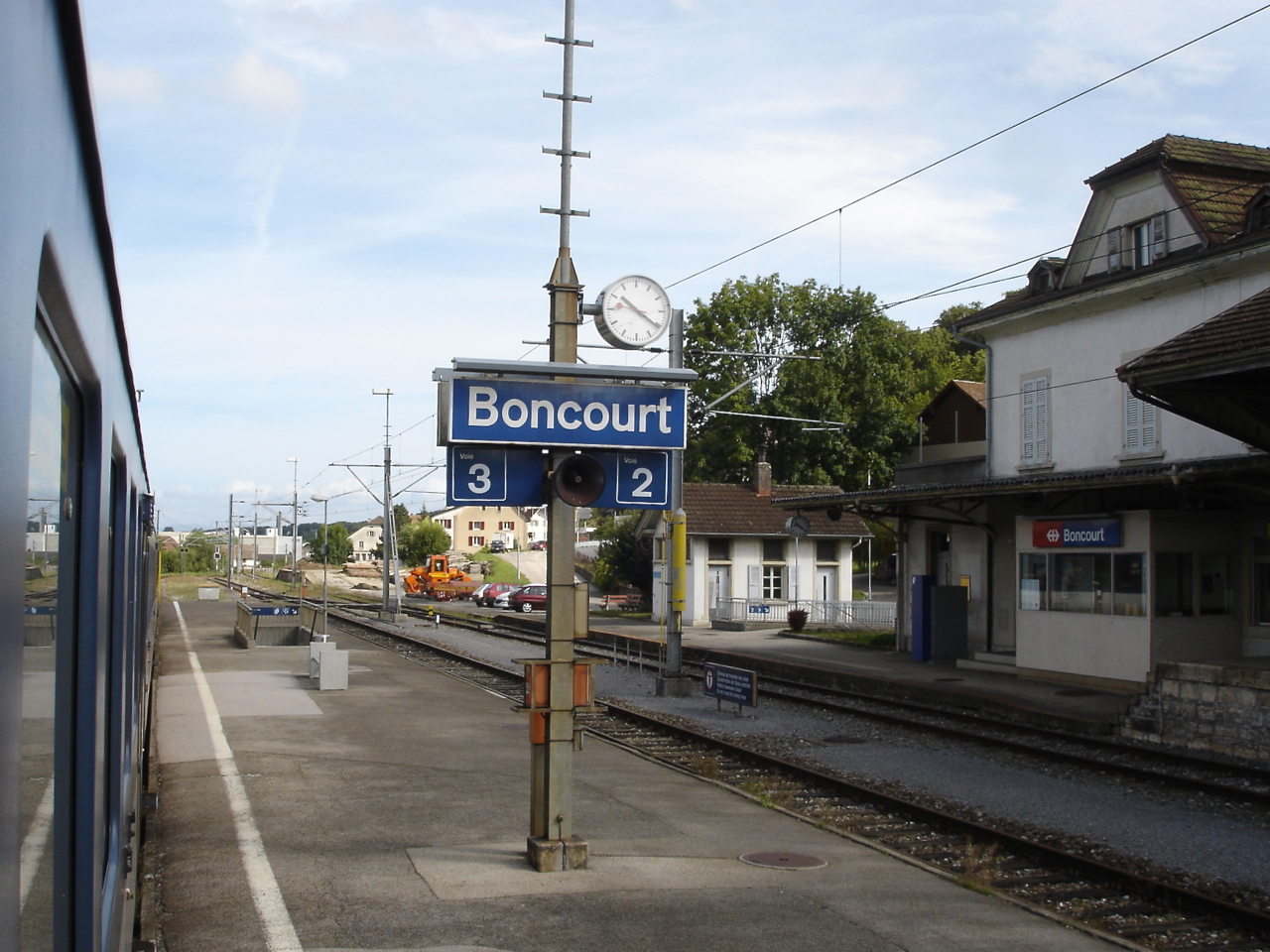
- The station building in 2008

General information
- Location: Boncourt; Switzerland
- Coordinates: 47°29′33″N 7°01′00″E
- Elevation: 373 m (1,224 ft)
- Owner: Swiss Federal Railways
- Line: Delémont–Delle line
- Distance: 123.4 km (76.7 mi) from Olten
- Platforms: 2 (1 island platform)
- Tracks: 3
- Train operators: Swiss Federal Railways

Construction
- Parking: 23
- Accessible: No

Other information
- Station code: 8500128 (BCT)
- Fare zone: 22 (Vagabond)

Passengers
- 2023: 290 per weekday (SBB)

Services
Preceding station	RER Jura	Following station
Delle Terminus	R1	Buix towards Delémont
Delle Terminus	R11	Buix towards Porrentruy
Location
- Location within Switzerland Location within Canton of Jura

Boncourt railway station (French: Gare de Boncourt) is a railway station in the municipality of Boncourt, in the Swiss canton of Jura. It is an intermediate stop on the standard gauge Delémont–Delle line of Swiss Federal Railways.

== History ==
Between January 2025 and December 2025, the station's infrastructure will be upgraded to improve access, platform capacity, and safety. The island platform will be raised to a height of 55 centimetres (22 in) and extended to permit barrier-free boarding. The underpass will be rebuilt and widened, with new ramps added for people with reduced mobility. A shelter will be created on the platform. Additionally, the tracks will also be replaced.

== Services ==
As of the December 2025 timetable change, the following services stop at Boncourt:

- RER Jura: half-hourly service to Delle and Porrentruy and hourly service to Delémont.
