= Le Locle railway station =

Railway station in Le Locle, Switzerland

Le Locle
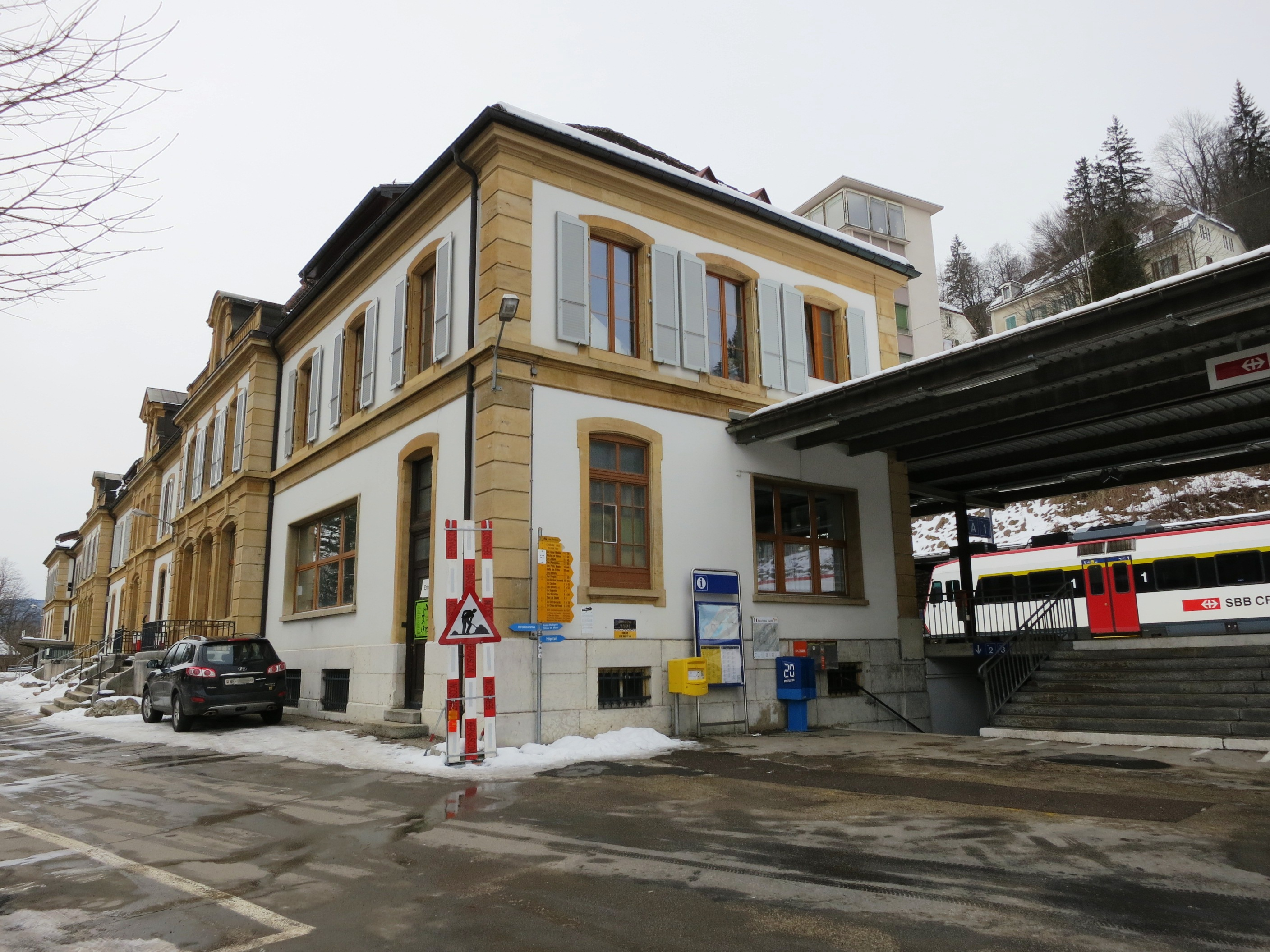
- The station building in 2014

General information
- Location: Le Locle; Switzerland
- Coordinates: 47°03′28″N 6°44′46″E
- Elevation: 946 m (3,104 ft)
- Owner: Swiss Federal Railways (since 1913); Jura industriel (1857-..)
- Lines: Le Locle–Les Brenets line; Neuchâtel–Le Locle-Col-des-Roches line
- Distance: 37.1 km (23.1 mi) from Neuchâtel
- Platforms: 2 side platforms
- Tracks: 3
- Train operators: SNCF; Swiss Federal Railways; Transports publics neuchâtelois
- Connections: Transports publics neuchâtelois buses

Construction
- Parking: Yes (52 spaces)
- Cycle facilities: Yes (14 spaces)
- Accessible: No

Other information
- Station code: 8504316 (LOC)
- Fare zone: 20 (Onde Verte)

History
- Opened: 1857
- Rebuilt: 1884
- Electrified: 1931

Passengers
- 2023: 3'000 per weekday (SBB (except TRN))

Services
Preceding station	SBB CFF FFS	Following station
Terminus	R20	Le Crêt-du-Locle towards La Chaux-de-Fonds
Terminus	R20	Le Crêt-du-Locle towards Neuchâtel
Preceding station	TER Bourgogne-Franche-Comté	Following station
Le Locle-Col-des-Roches towards Besançon	TER	Le Crêt-du-Locle towards La Chaux-de-Fonds
Preceding station	Transports publics Neuchâtelois	Following station
Le Locle Le Chalet towards Les Brenets	R24	Terminus
Location
- Location within Switzerland Location within Canton of Neuchâtel

Le Locle railway station (French: Gare du Locle) is a railway station in the municipality of Le Locle, in the Swiss canton of Neuchâtel. It is located at the junction of the standard gauge Neuchâtel–Le Locle-Col-des-Roches line of Swiss Federal Railways and the 1,000 mm (3 ft 3 3/8 in) gauge Le Locle–Les Brenets line of Transports publics neuchâtelois.

Le Remontoir is an inclined elevator linking it to the city centre.

== Services ==
As of the December 2024 timetable change, the following services stop at Le Locle:

- Regio: two trains per hour to La Chaux-de-Fonds, one train per hour to Neuchâtel, and hourly or better service to Les Brenets.
- TER: infrequent service from La Chaux-de-Fonds to Morteau or Besançon-Viotte.

== See also ==
- Rail transport in Switzerland
