= Besançon-Viotte station =

French railway station

Besançon–Viotte
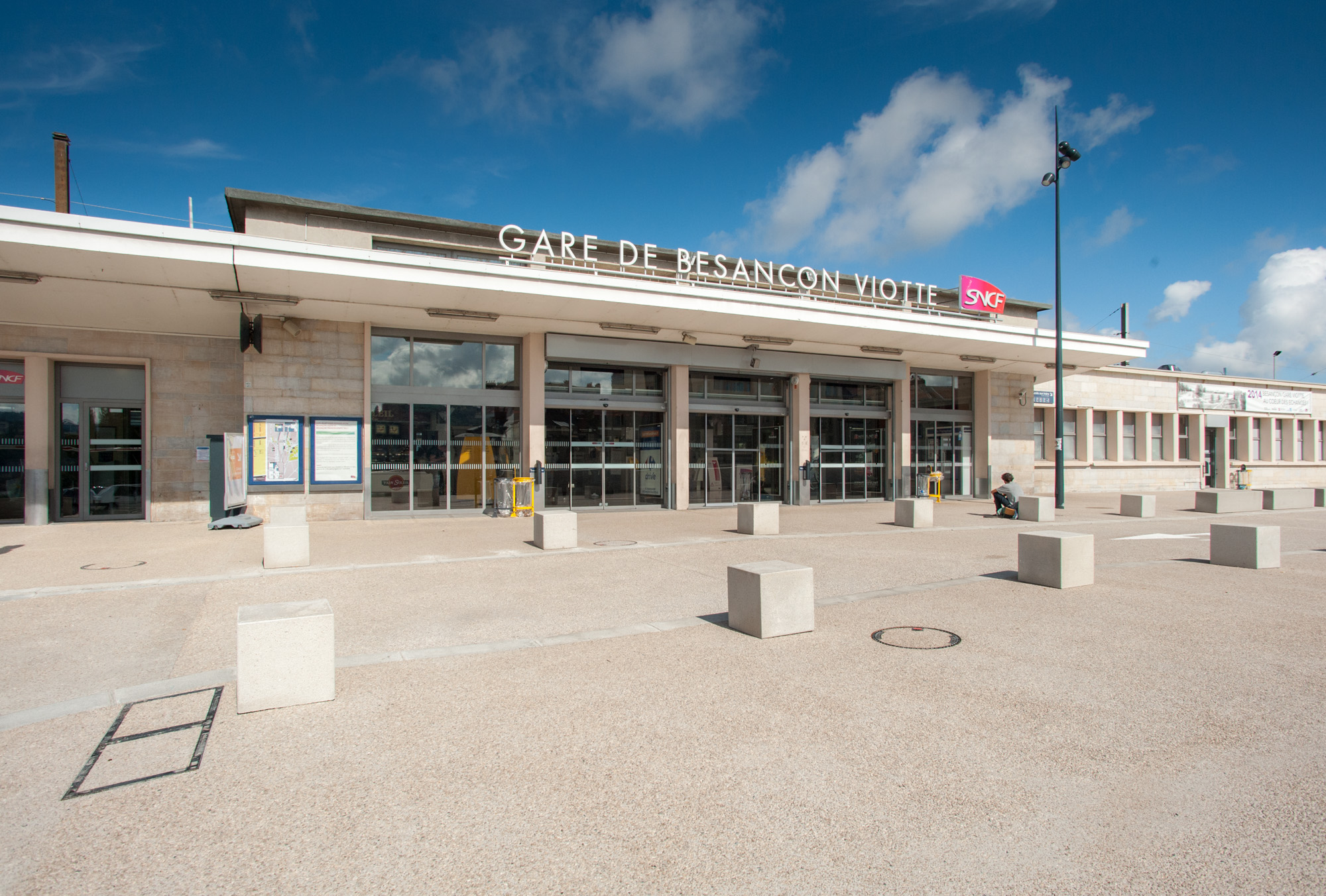
- Besançon-Viotte railway station

General information
- Location: Besançon, Doubs, Bourgogne-Franche-Comté, France
- Coordinates: 47°14′49″N 6°1′19″E
- Lines: Dole–Belfort railway Besançon–Le Locle railway Besançon-Viotte-Vesoul railway
- Platforms: 8

Other information
- Station code: 87718007

History
- Opened: 1855

Passengers
- 2024: 2,903,968
Services
Preceding station	SNCF	Following station
Besançon Franche-Comté TGV towards Paris-Lyon	TGV	Terminus
Preceding station	TER Bourgogne-Franche-Comté	Following station
Dannemarie – Velesmes towards Dijon	TER	Terminus
Franois towards Bourg-en-Bresse	TER	Terminus
Terminus	TER	Roche-lez-Beaupré towards Belfort
Terminus	TER	Besançon-La Mouillère towards La Chaux-de-Fonds
Terminus	TER	École-Valentin towards Besançon Franche-Comté TGV
Location

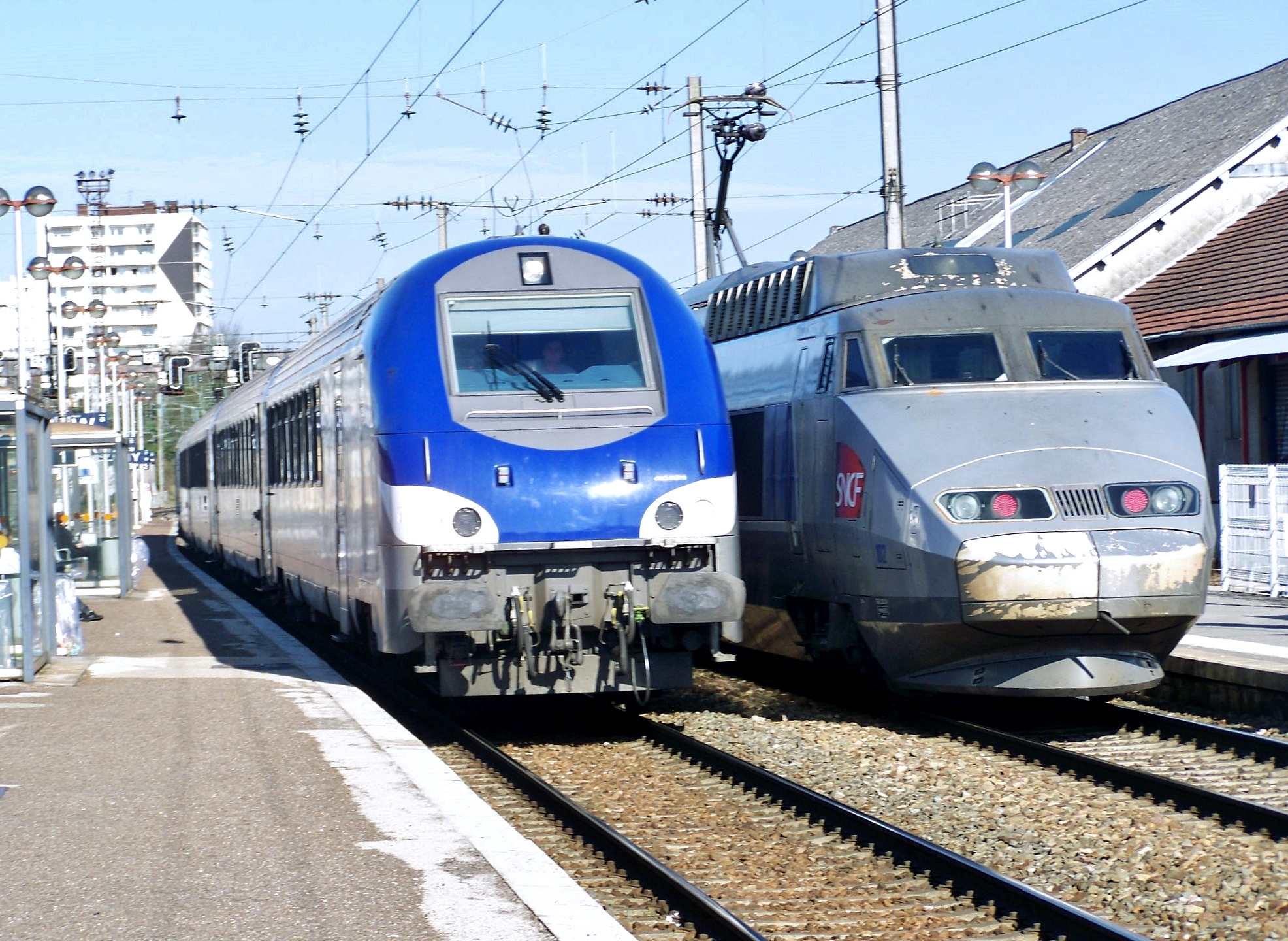
TER and TGV trains at Viotte

Besançon–Viotte is the main railway station located in Besançon, Doubs, eastern France. The station was opened in 1855 and is located on the Dole–Belfort railway, Besançon–Le Locle railway and Besançon-Viotte-Vesoul railway. The train services are operated by SNCF. Besançon Franche-Comté TGV is a high speed station located 10km north of Besançon.

== Train services ==
From Besançon-Viotte train services depart to major French cities such as Paris, Dijon, Strasbourg and Lyon. International services operate to Switzerland: La Chaux-de-Fonds. The station is also served by regional trains towards Montbéliard, Belfort, Dole and Lons-le-Saunier.

- High speed services (TGV) Paris - Dijon - Besançon
- Shuttle services (TER Bourgogne-Franche-Comté) Besançon - Besançon TGV
- Regional services (TER Bourgogne-Franche-Comté) Besançon - Mouchard - Lons-le-Saunier - Bourg-en-Bresse - Lyon
- Regional services (TER Bourgogne-Franche-Comté) Besançon - Montbéliard - Belfort
- Regional services (TER Bourgogne-Franche-Comté) Besançon - Dole - Dijon
- Regional services (TER Bourgogne-Franche-Comté) Besançon - Morteau - La Chaux-de-Fonds
- Bus services (TER) Besançon - Vesoul
- Bus services (TER) Besançon - Gray
