= Le Locle–Les Brenets line =

Narrow gauge railway line in Switzerland

Le Locle–Les Brenets
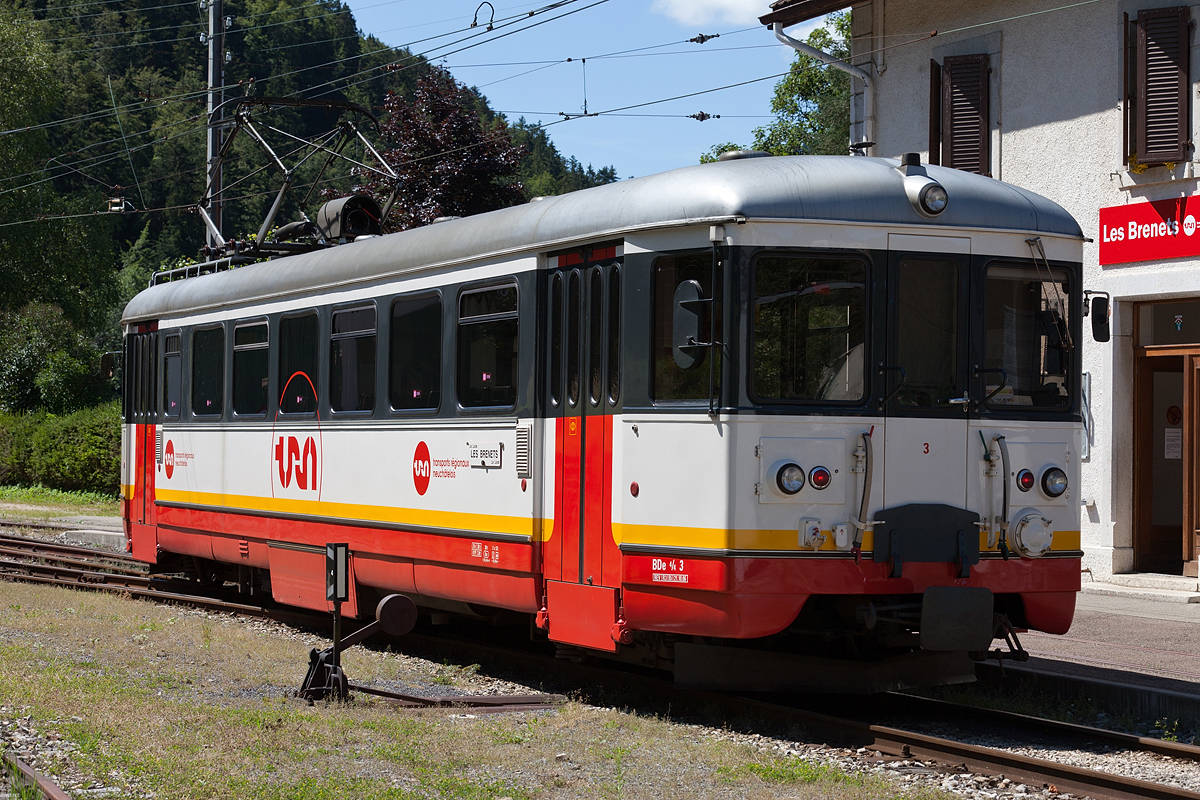
- A TRN railcar at Les Brenets in 2011

Overview
- Owner: Transports publics Neuchâtelois
- Line number: 224
- Termini: Le Locle; Les Brenets

History
- Opened: 1 September 1890

Technical
- Line length: 4.1 km (2.5 mi)
- Track gauge: 1,000 mm (3 ft 3 3/8 in) metre gauge
- Electrification: 1500 V DC overhead catenary

The Le Locle–Les Brenets line is a 1,000 mm (3 ft 3 3/8 in) railway line in the canton of Neuchâtel in Switzerland. It runs 4.1 kilometres (2.5 mi) from Le Locle, where it has a cross-platform interchange with the standard gauge Neuchâtel–Le Locle-Col-des-Roches line of Swiss Federal Railways, to Les Brenets. The line was originally built by the Régional des Brenets and opened on 1 September 1890.

Today, it is operated by the Transports publics Neuchâtelois. On 24 July 2020, the canton of Neuchâtel announced their intention to close the line in 2025, to be replaced by an electric bus service that would use the Petits-Monts railway tunnel. However, it was subsequently announced in June 2023 that the line would continue to operate in its present form at least until 2031.
