= Le Crêt-du-Locle railway station =

Railway station in La Chaux-de-Fonds. Switzerland

Le Crêt-du-Locle
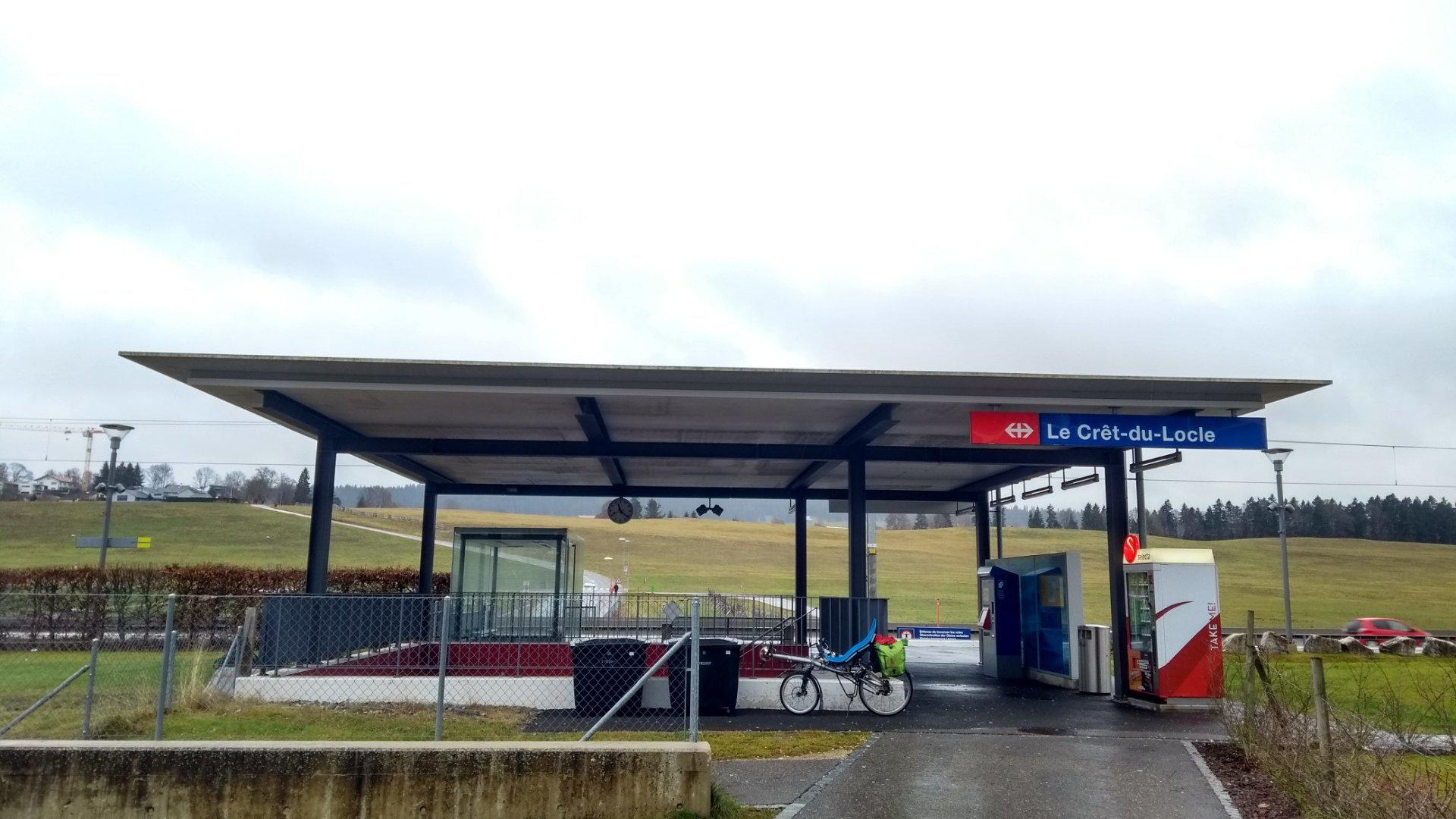
- The station in 2018

General information
- Location: La Chaux-de-Fonds; Switzerland
- Coordinates: 47°04′39″N 6°47′07″E
- Elevation: 1,014 m (3,327 ft)
- Owner: Swiss Federal Railways
- Line: Neuchâtel–Le Locle-Col-des-Roches line
- Distance: 33.3 km (20.7 mi) from Neuchâtel
- Platforms: 1 side platform
- Tracks: 1
- Train operators: SNCF; Swiss Federal Railways
- Connections: Transports publics neuchâtelois buses

Construction
- Parking: Yes (26 spaces)
- Accessible: Yes

Other information
- Station code: 8504315 (CRET)
- Fare zone: 20 (Onde Verte)

Passengers
- 2023: 730 per weekday (SBB)

Services
| Preceding station | SBB CFF FFS | Following station |
|---|---|---|
| Le Locle Terminus | R20 | La Chaux-de-Fonds Les Forges towards La Chaux-de-Fonds |
| Le Locle Terminus | R20 | La Chaux-de-Fonds Les Forges towards Neuchâtel |
| Preceding station | TER Bourgogne-Franche-Comté | Following station |
| Le Locle towards Besançon | TER | La Chaux-de-Fonds Les Forges towards La Chaux-de-Fonds |
Location
- Location within Switzerland Location within Canton of Neuchâtel

Le Crêt-du-Locle railway station (French: Gare du Crêt-du-Locle) is a railway station in the municipality of La Chaux-de-Fonds, in the Swiss canton of Neuchâtel. It is an intermediate stop on the standard gauge Neuchâtel–Le Locle-Col-des-Roches line of Swiss Federal Railways.

== Services ==
As of the December 2024 timetable change, the following services stop at Le Crêt-du-Locle:

- Regio: two trains per hour to Le Locle and La Chaux-de-Fonds and one train per hour to Neuchâtel.
- TER: infrequent service from La Chaux-de-Fonds to Morteau or Besançon-Viotte.
