= La Chaux-de-Fonds Les Forges railway station =

Railway station in La Chaux-de-Fonds, Switzerland

La Chaux-de-Fonds Les Forges
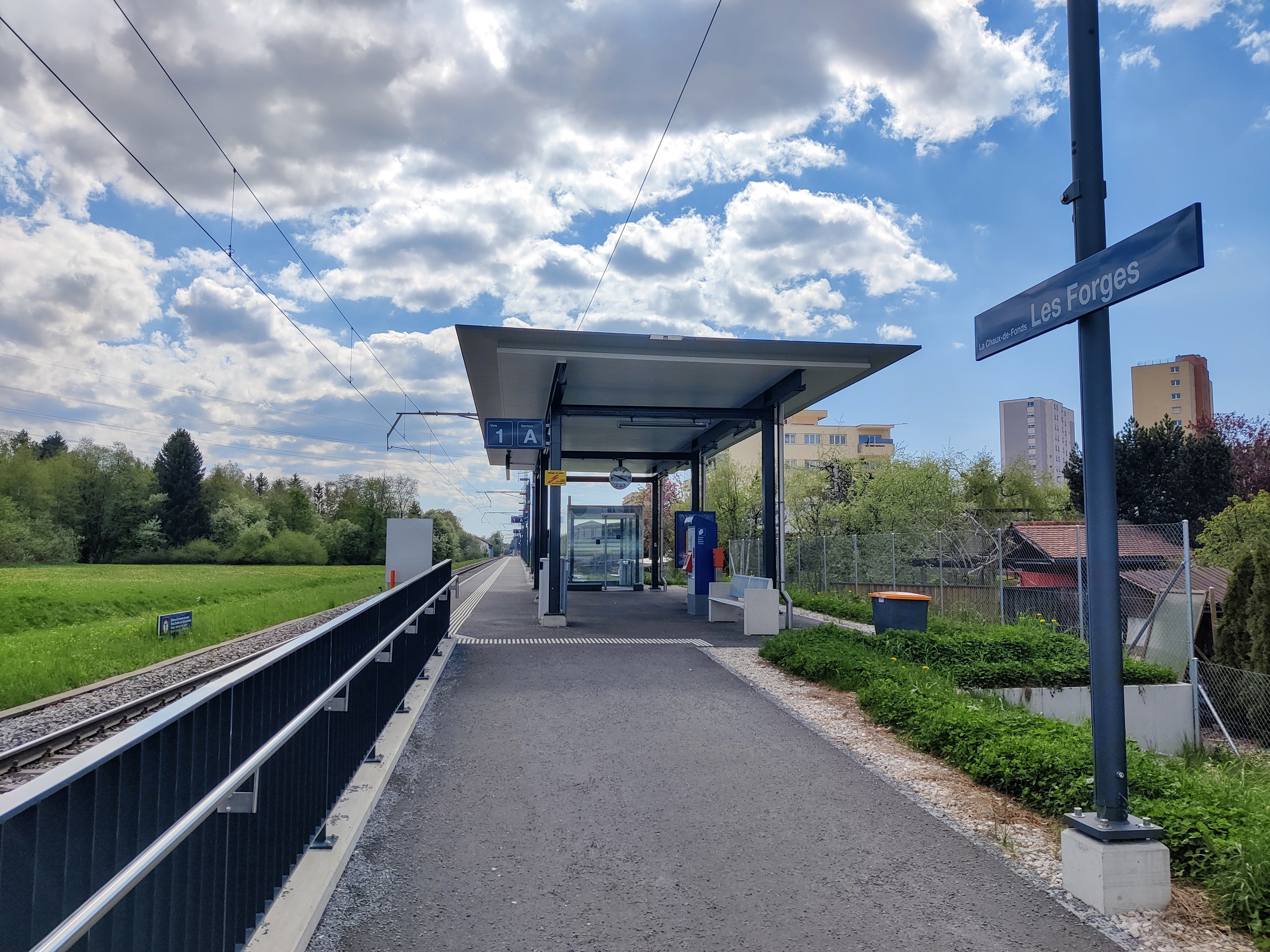
- The station platform in 2022

General information
- Location: La Chaux-de-Fonds; Switzerland
- Coordinates: 47°05′29″N 6°48′46″E
- Elevation: 1,001 m (3,284 ft)
- Line: Neuchâtel–Le Locle-Col-des-Roches line
- Distance: 30.7 km (19.1 mi) from Neuchâtel
- Platforms: 1 side platform
- Tracks: 1
- Train operators: Swiss Federal Railways

Construction
- Accessible: Yes

Other information
- Station code: 8504321 (CFO)
- Fare zone: 20 (Onde Verte)

History
- Opened: 12 December 2021

Passengers
- 2023: 260 per weekday (SBB)

Services
Preceding station	SBB CFF FFS	Following station
Le Crêt-du-Locle towards Le Locle	R20	La Chaux-de-Fonds Terminus
Le Crêt-du-Locle towards Le Locle	R20	La Chaux-de-Fonds towards Neuchâtel
Preceding station	TER Bourgogne-Franche-Comté	Following station
Le Crêt-du-Locle towards Besançon	TER	La Chaux-de-Fonds Terminus
Location
- Location within Switzerland Location within Canton of Neuchâtel

La Chaux-de-Fonds Les Forges railway station (French: Gare de La Chaux-de-Fonds Les Forges) is a railway station in the municipality of La Chaux-de-Fonds, in the Swiss canton of Neuchâtel. It is an intermediate stop on the standard gauge Neuchâtel–Le Locle-Col-des-Roches line of Swiss Federal Railways.

== History ==
Another station at the same location, La Chaux-de-Fonds Ouest (lit. 'La Chaux-de-Fonds West'), closed in 1995. The new station was built at a cost of SFr 8.5 million, split between La Chaux-de-Fonds, the Canton of Neuchâtel, and the federal government. The station opened with the December 2021 timetable change.

== Layout ==
La Chaux-de-Fonds Les Forges has a single side platform, 230 metres (750 ft) long. The platform is 55 centimetres (22 in) high.

== Services ==
As of the December 2024 timetable change, the following services stop at La Chaux-de-Fonds Les Forges:

- Regio: two trains per hour to Le Locle and La Chaux-de-Fonds and one train per hour to Neuchâtel.
- TER: infrequent service between La Chaux-de-Fonds and Morteau or Besançon-Viotte.
