= List of bishops of Basel =

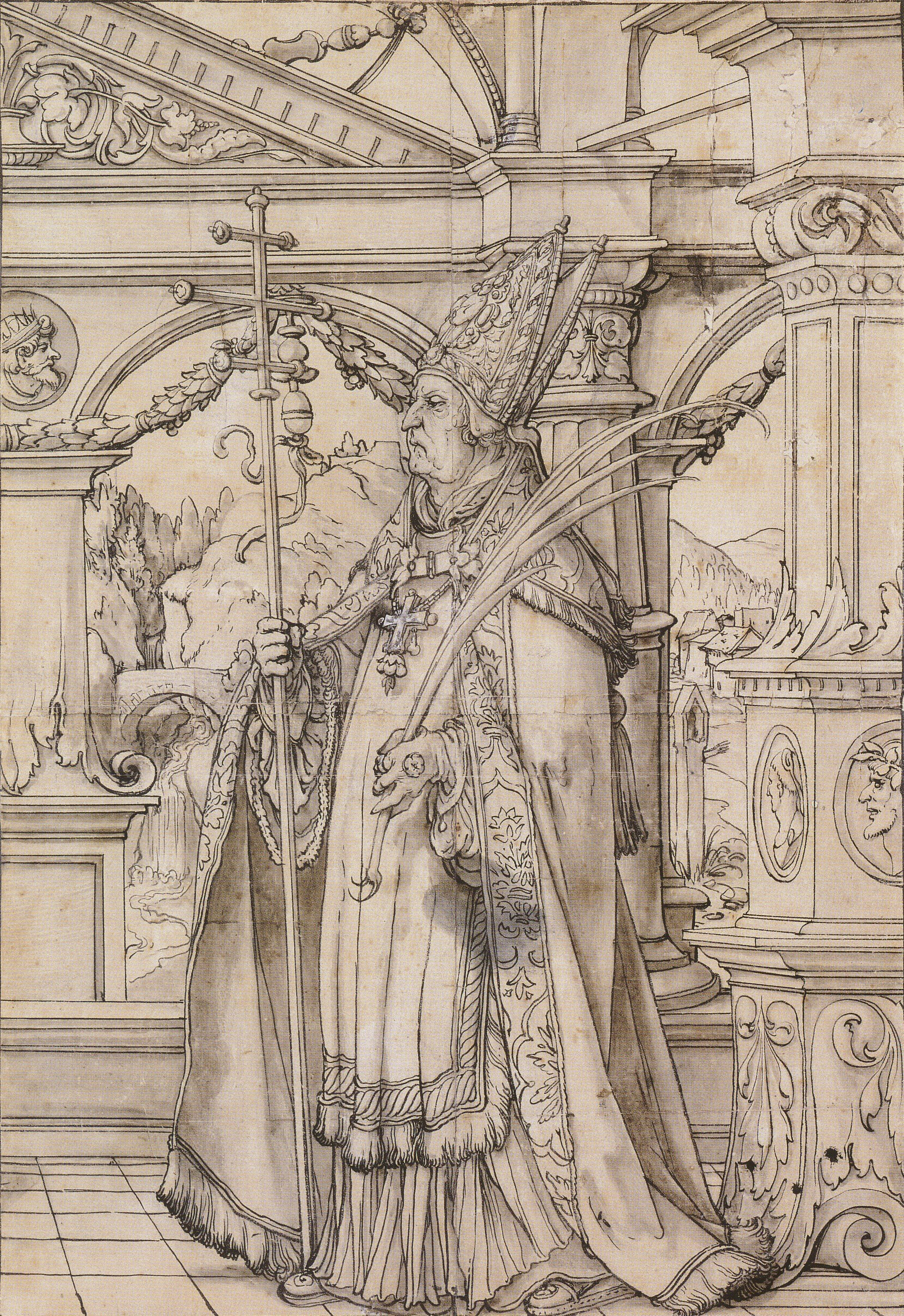
St Pantalus under a Renaissance Portico (1519–21), a design for a stained glass window by Hans Holbein the Younger later incorporated into the organ shutters at Basel Cathedral: the legendary first bishop of Basel is depicted holding a palm branch symbolizing his martyrdom

The beginning of the succession of bishops of Basel is shrouded in legend. The first, St. Pantalus, eludes historical documentation. He is supposed to have been martyred at Cologne with Saint Ursula, who is herself difficult to locate historically.

== Early history ==
Year	Bishop
ca. 346	Justinianus Rauricorum
ca. 615	Ragnacharius
ca. 740	Walaus
ca. 751	Baldebert
?-805	Waldo of Reichenau
805–823	Haito
823–835	Ulrich I
844–859	Wighard
859–860	Fredebert
ca. 875	Adalwin
ca. 892	Rudolf I
892–895	Iring
895–916	Adalbert I
ca. 917	Landeolus
917–921	Wilhelm
ca. 930	Wighard II
950–974	Rudolf II
ca. 984	Gebizo von Altenburg

== Prince-bishops ==
Year	Bishop
999–1025	Adalbero II
1021–1025	Rudolf III
1025	Adalbert III.
1025–1040	Ulrich II
1040	Bruno ?
1041–1055	Theodorich
1055–1072	Berengar von Wetterau
1072–1105	Burchard of Basle, or of Hasenburg
1107–1122	Rudolf IV von Homburg
1122–1133	Berthold von Neuenburg
1133–1137	Adalbert IV. von Froburg
1138–1164	Ortlieb von Froburg
1164–1179	Ludwig Garewart
1180	Hugo von Hasenburg
1180–1191	Heinrich I von Horburg
1192–1213	Leuthold I von Rotheln
1213–1215	Walther von Rotheln
1216–1238	Heinrich II von Thun
1238–1249	Leuthold II von Arburg
1250–1262	Berthold II von Pfirt
1262–1274	Heinrich III von Neuenburg-Erguel
1275–1286	Heinrich IV Knoderer
1286–1296	Peter I Reich von Reichenstein
1297–1306	Peter von Aspelt
1306–1309	Eudes de Granson
1309–1325	Gerhard von Wippingen
1325–1332	Hartung Münch
1332–1335	Jean I Arley
1335–1365	Johann II von Munsingen
1365–1382	Jean III de Vienne
1382–1391	Imer von Ramstein
?-1392-?	Friedrich von Blankenheim (also of Strasbourg)
1393–1395	Konrad Munch von Landskron
1399–1418	Humbrecht von Neuenburg
1418–1423	Hartmann II von Munchenstein
1423–1436	Johann IV von Fleckenstein
1437–1451	Friedrich von der Pfalz
1451–1458	Arnold von Rothburg
1458–1478	Johann V von Venningen
1479–1502	Caspar von Mühlhausen
1502–1527	Christoph von Utenheim
1527–1553	Philippe von Gundelsheim
1554–1575	Melchior von Lichtenfels
1575–1608	Jakob Christoph Blarer von Wartensee
1608–1628	Wilhelm Rink von Baldenstein
1628–1646	Johann Heinrich von Ostheim
1646–1651	Beat Albrecht von Ramstein
1651–1656	Johann Franz von Schönau-Zell
1656–1693	Johann Konrad von Roggenbach
1693–1705	Wilhelm Jakob Rink von Baldenstein
1705–1737	Johann Konrad von Reinach-Hirtzbach
1737–1743	Jakob Sigismund von Reinach-Steinbrunn
1744–1762	Josef Wilhelm Rinck von Baldenstein
1762–1775	Simon Nikolaus Euseb von Montjoye-Hirsingen
1775–1782	Friedrich Ludwig Franz von Wangen zu Geroldseck
1782–1794	Franz Joseph Sigismund von Roggenbach
1794–1828	Franz Xaver von Neveu

== Modern diocese ==
Year	Bishop
1828–1854	Josef Anton Salzmann
1854–1862	Karl Arnold-Obrist
1863–1885	Eugen Lachat
1885–1888	Friedrich Fiala
1888–1906	Leonhard Haas
1906–1925	Jakob Stammler
1925–1936	Josephus Ambühl
1937–1967	Franziskus von Streng
1968–1982	Anton Hänggi
1982–1993	Otto Wüst
1994–1995	Hansjörg Vogel
1995–2010	Kurt Koch
since 2011	Felix Gmür

== See also ==
- Timeline of Basel
