= Gmür =

Gmür is a Swiss surname. Notable people with the surname include:

- Chiara Gmür (born 1993), Swiss alpine skier
- Felix Gmür (born 1966), Swiss Roman Catholic bishop
- Hans Gmür (1927–2004), Swiss theater director
- Martina Gmür (born 1979), Swiss visual artist
- Philipp Gmür (born 1963), Swiss lawyer
- Théo Gmür (born 1996), Swiss alpine skier
