= Jean Frédéric Conrad de Gléresse =

Official of the Prince-Bishopric of Basel (1706–1777)

- Born: 16 September 1706; Le Landeron, Prince-Bishopric of Basel
- Died: 10 July 1777 (aged 70); Porrentruy, Prince-Bishopric of Basel
- Occupation: Court official
- Spouse: Marie Victoire Madeleine Rinck de Baldenstein
- Children: Jean Henri Hermann de Gléresse

Jean Frédéric Conrad de Gléresse, in German Johann Friedrich Konrad von Ligerz (16 September 1706 – 10 July 1777), was an official of the Prince-Bishopric of Basel who served as its grand master and first minister, and who built the Hôtel de Gléresse in Porrentruy.

== Biography ==
Gléresse was baptized on 16 September 1706 at Le Landeron, the son of François Georges de Gléresse, and was a citizen of La Neuveville. In 1738 he married Marie Victoire Madeleine Rinck de Baldenstein (1719–1810), daughter of Joseph Guillaume Rinck de Baldenstein and sister of the prince-bishop Joseph Guillaume Rinck de Baldenstein. With their children, who left no descendants, the Catholic branch of the family died out in 1819.

At Porrentruy from 1724, Gléresse was grand master of the household at the castle and an aulic councillor (1731), castellan of Ajoie, and a privy councillor. As grand master from 1763, he presided over the privy council, the aulic council, and the chamber of finances. He was one of the two representatives of the bishopric at the negotiations with Bern concluded by the treaty of Biel of 20 February 1758, which ended the tensions between the prince and the towns of Biel and La Neuveville, both allied burgher-towns of Bern.

Gléresse is chiefly known for the town mansion he had built at Porrentruy from 1748 to 1751, to the plans of the architect Johann Caspar Bagnato. On the death of the family's last heir, the Hôtel de Gléresse passed to the Rinck de Baldenstein cousins, who ceded it to the state of Bern in 1821. Having served as the seat of the bailiwick administration and then of the prefecture of Porrentruy, it has housed since 1963 the Archives of the former Prince-Bishopric of Basel and the historical collections of the Jura cantonal library.

== Bibliography ==
- P. Braun, Joseph Wilhelm Rinck von Baldenstein (1704–1762), 1981
- O. Clottu, "La pierre tombale de Jacob de Gléresse", in Panorama du pays jurassien, 3, 1983, 84–97
- H. M. Gubler, Johann Caspar Bagnato, 1985, 386–389
