= Jean Henri Hermann de Gléresse =

Swiss cathedral canon and diplomat (1739–1817)

- Born: 12 September 1739; Porrentruy, Prince-Bishopric of Basel
- Died: 8 December 1817 (aged 78); Freiburg im Breisgau, Grand Duchy of Baden
- Occupations: Catholic canon; diplomat

Jean Henri Hermann de Gléresse, in German Johann Heinrich Hermann von Ligerz (12 September 1739 – 8 December 1817), was a Swiss Roman Catholic canon of the cathedral chapter of Basel and a diplomat who undertook missions on behalf of the prince-bishopric of Basel in its final years.

== Biography ==
Gléresse was born on 12 September 1739 in Porrentruy, the son of Jean Frédéric Conrad de Gléresse, and was a citizen of La Neuveville. He attended the Jesuit college of Porrentruy from 1751 to 1754 and earned a doctorate in philosophy from the episcopal university of Strasbourg in 1757. He became a canon of the cathedral chapter of Basel at Arlesheim in 1763, cellarer of the chapter in 1782, provost of Enschingen in Upper Alsace in 1789, and grand archdeacon in 1790.

As a deputy of the cathedral chapter to the prince-bishop of Basel, Gléresse undertook important missions from 1790 onward to preserve the prince-bishopric, travelling to Vienna in 1790 and to the Congress of Rastatt in 1797–1798. In 1792, he fled with the prince-bishop to Biel and then to Constance, returned to La Neuveville in 1794, and again left for Constance. He stayed at Freiburg im Breisgau in 1797 and at Fribourg in 1799, was imprisoned as a hostage at the castle of Chillon in 1799, and from 1801 lived once more at Freiburg im Breisgau.

Together with his cousin Balbine de Staal and François Charles d'Andlau, Gléresse created the English garden of Arlesheim.

== Bibliography ==
- M. Jorio, Der Untergang des Fürstbistums Basel (1792–1815), 1982
- C. Bosshart-Pfluger, Das Basler Domkapitel von seiner Übersiedlung nach Arlesheim bis zur Säkularisation (1678–1803), 1983, 224–226
