= Joseph Wilhelm Rinck von Baldenstein =

Disambiguation page

Joseph Wilhelm Rinck von Baldenstein may refer to two members of the Rinck von Baldenstein family, father and son:

- Joseph Wilhelm Rinck von Baldenstein (bailiff) (1672–1752), administrator of the Prince-Bishopric of Basel
- Joseph Wilhelm Rinck von Baldenstein (prince-bishop) (1704–1762), prince-bishop of Basel from 1744
