= Johann Konrad von Reinach-Hirtzbach =

- Bishop of Basel
- Church: Catholic Church
- Diocese: Diocese of Basel
- In office: 13 July 1693 – 19 March 1737
- Predecessor: Wilhelm Jakob Rink von Baldenstein
- Successor: Jakob Sigismund von Reinach-Steinbrunn

Orders
- Ordination: 20 September 1692
- Consecration: 1 November 1705 by Vincenzo Bichi

Personal details
- Born: 28 August 1657 Michelbach-le-Haut, Province of Alsace, Kingdom of France
- Died: 19 March 1737 (aged 79)

Shield of the Reinach family.

Johann Konrad von Reinach-Hirtzbach (1657–1737) was the Prince-Bishop of Basel from 1705 to 1737.

== Biography ==
Johann Konrad von Reinach-Hirtzbach was born in Michelbach-le-Haut on 28 August 1657, the son of Hans Diebold Freiherr von Reinach-Hirtzbach (d. 1702) and his wife Anna Maria Eva von Freiin von Reinach-Steinbrunnborn (d. 1702).

He was educated at the Jesuit high school in Porrentruy from 1673 to 1678. He was ordained as a priest on 20 September 1678. He was then sent to the Collegium Germanicum in Rome, where he studied theology and philosophy. He was made a canon in 1681, and in 1704, he became the dean of Basel Münster.

On 11 July 1705 the cathedral chapter of Basel Münster elected him to be the new Prince-Bishop of Basel, with Pope Clement XI confirming this appointment on 5 September 1705. He was subsequently consecrated as a bishop by Vincenzo Bichi.

Johann Konrad is generally considered the first absolutist ruler of the Prince-Bishopric of Basel. He instituted administrative centralization, which was ultimately thwarted by popular resistance, but which paved the way for more modern management techniques in the future.

In 1724, Johann Konrad suffered a riding accident, which left him with a disability for the rest of his life. As such, his younger brother, Johann Baptist von Reinach-Hirtzbach (1669–1734), was selected as his coadjutor bishop, though Johann Baptist never became Prince-Bishop because he predeceased Johann Konrad.

During this sovereignty, followers of the Mennonite faith, who had faced persecution in the canton of Bern because of not worshipping under the catholic religion, fled to the bishopric of Basel. Here they rented little farms and worked on the estates of noblemen. In the year 1734 an edict was passed by the Prince-Bishop that all Mennonites in the bishopric should be driven out. The owners of these little farms and the noblemen affected by this ruling came forward and pleaded on behalf of the Mennonites. Their message was that the natives are not farmers, but the Mennonites excel at farming, and they wanted them to remain and farm their lands. Therefore, despite the authoritarian edict, it was never carried out.

Johann Konrad died on 19 March 1737.

Catholic Church titles
Preceded by Wilhelm Jakob Rink von Baldenstein	Prince-Bishop of Basel; 1705–1737	Succeeded by Jakob Sigismund von Reinach-Steinbrunn
