= Simon Nikolaus Euseb von Montjoye-Hirsingen =

- Bishop of Basel
- Church: Catholic Church
- Diocese: Diocese of Basel
- In office: 21 March 1763 – 5 April 1775
- Predecessor: Josef Wilhelm Rinck von Baldenstein
- Successor: Friedrich Ludwig Franz von Wangen zu Geroldseck

Orders
- Ordination: 22 December 1731
- Consecration: 5 April 1775 by Antoine Clériadus de Choiseul-Beaupré

Personal details
- Born: 22 September 1693 Hirsingue, Province of Alsace, Kingdom of France
- Died: 5 April 1775 (aged 81) Porrentruy, Canton of Bern, Swiss Confederacy

Simon Nikolaus Euseb Reichsgraf von Montjoye-Hirsingen (1693–1775) was the Prince-Bishop of Basel from 1762 to 1775.

== Biography ==
Simon Nikolaus Euseb von Montjoye-Hirsingen was born in Hirsingen, Alsace, on 22 September 1693, the son of Franz Ignaz von Montjoye-Hirsingen, a brigadier in the French Army. The family also sometimes used Froburg as its family name.

He was educated at the Jesuit gymnasium in Porrentruy, then spent 1712 studying in Strasbourg. From 1713 to 1717, he studied at the Collegium Germanicum in Rome.

He was ordained as a priest on 22 December 1731. He spent 1741-62 as provost of Enschingen.

On 26 October 1762 the cathedral chapter of Basel Münster elected him to be the new Prince-Bishop of Basel, with Pope Clement XIII confirming his appointment on 21 March 1763. He was consecrated as a bishop by Cardinal de Choiseul on 10 July 1763.

Bishop von Montjoye-Hirsingen was a supporter of the Physiocrats. In 1769, he introduced poor relief in the prince-bishopric.

He became sick in 1771, which led to premature electioneering in the prince-bishopric. He died in Porrentruy on 5 April 1775.

Catholic Church titles
Preceded by Josef Wilhelm Rinck von Baldenstein	Prince-Bishop of Basel; 1762–1775	Succeeded by Friedrich Ludwig Franz von Wangen zu Geroldseck
