= Jakob Sigismund von Reinach-Steinbrunn =

- Bishop of Basel
- Church: Catholic Church
- Diocese: Diocese of Basel
- In office: 30 September 1737 – 16 December 1743
- Predecessor: Johann Konrad von Reinach-Hirtzbach
- Successor: Josef Wilhelm Rinck von Baldenstein

Orders
- Ordination: 18 September 1717
- Consecration: 29 June 1738 by Giovanni Battista Barni

Personal details
- Born: 19 August 1683 Obersteinbrunn, Province of Alsace, Kingdom of France
- Died: 16 December 1743 (aged 60)

Jakob Sigismund von Reinach-Steinbrunn (1683–1743) was the Prince-Bishop of Basel from 1737 to 1743.

== Biography ==
Jakob Sigismund von Reinach-Steinbrunn was born in Obersteinbrunn, the son of Johann Jakob Kaspar Sigmund Freiherr von Reinach-Steinbrunn (d. 1693) and his wife Maria Salome Lucia von Pfirt (d. 1721).

From 1703 to 1705, he attended the Jesuit gymnasium in Porrentruy. He then studied Christian theology at the Collegium Germanicum in Rome.

He became a canon in 1707, and was ordained as a priest on 18 September 1717. He became the provost of Basel Münster in 1726.

On 4 June 1737 the cathedral chapter of Basel Münster elected him to be the new prince-bishop of Basel, with Pope Clement XII confirming his appointment on 30 September 1737. He was consecrated as a bishop by Cardinal Barni on 29 June 1738.

He died on 16 December 1743.

Catholic Church titles
Preceded by Johann Konrad von Reinach-Hirtzbach	Prince-Bishop of Basel; 1737–1743	Succeeded by Josef Wilhelm Rinck von Baldenstein
