= Marcus Teggingeri =

Most Reverend Marcus Teggingeri
- Titular Bishop of Lydda
- Church: Catholic Church
- In office: 1568–1599

Orders
- Ordination: 1561
- Consecration: 21 December 1568 by Otto Truchseß von Waldburg

Personal details
- Born: 1540 Radolfzell, Germany
- Died: 20 February 1600 (aged 59–60) Freiburg, Germany

Marcus Teggingeri (1540–1600), also known as Marcus Tettinger, was a Roman Catholic prelate who served as Titular Bishop of Lydda (1568–1599) and Auxiliary Bishop of Basel (1568–1599).

== Biography ==
Marcus Teggingeri was born in Radolfzell and ordained a priest in 1561. On 10 Dec 1568, he was appointed during the papacy of Pope Pius V as Titular Bishop of Lydda and Auxiliary Bishop of Basel. On 21 Dec 1568, he was consecrated bishop by Otto Truchseß von Waldburg, Cardinal-Bishop of Albano, with Giulio Antonio Santorio, Archbishop of Santa Severina, and William Chisholm, Bishop of Dunblane, serving as co-consecrators. In 1599, he resigned as Auxiliary Bishop of Basel. On 20 Feb 1600, he died in Freiburg, Germany.

While bishop, he was the principal consecrator of Jakob Christoph Blarer von Wartensee, Bishop of Basel (1577); and the principal co-consecrator of Melchior Lichtenfels, Bishop of Basel (1569).
