= Karl Arnold-Obrist =

Swiss Catholic bishop (1796-1862)

- Bishop of Basel
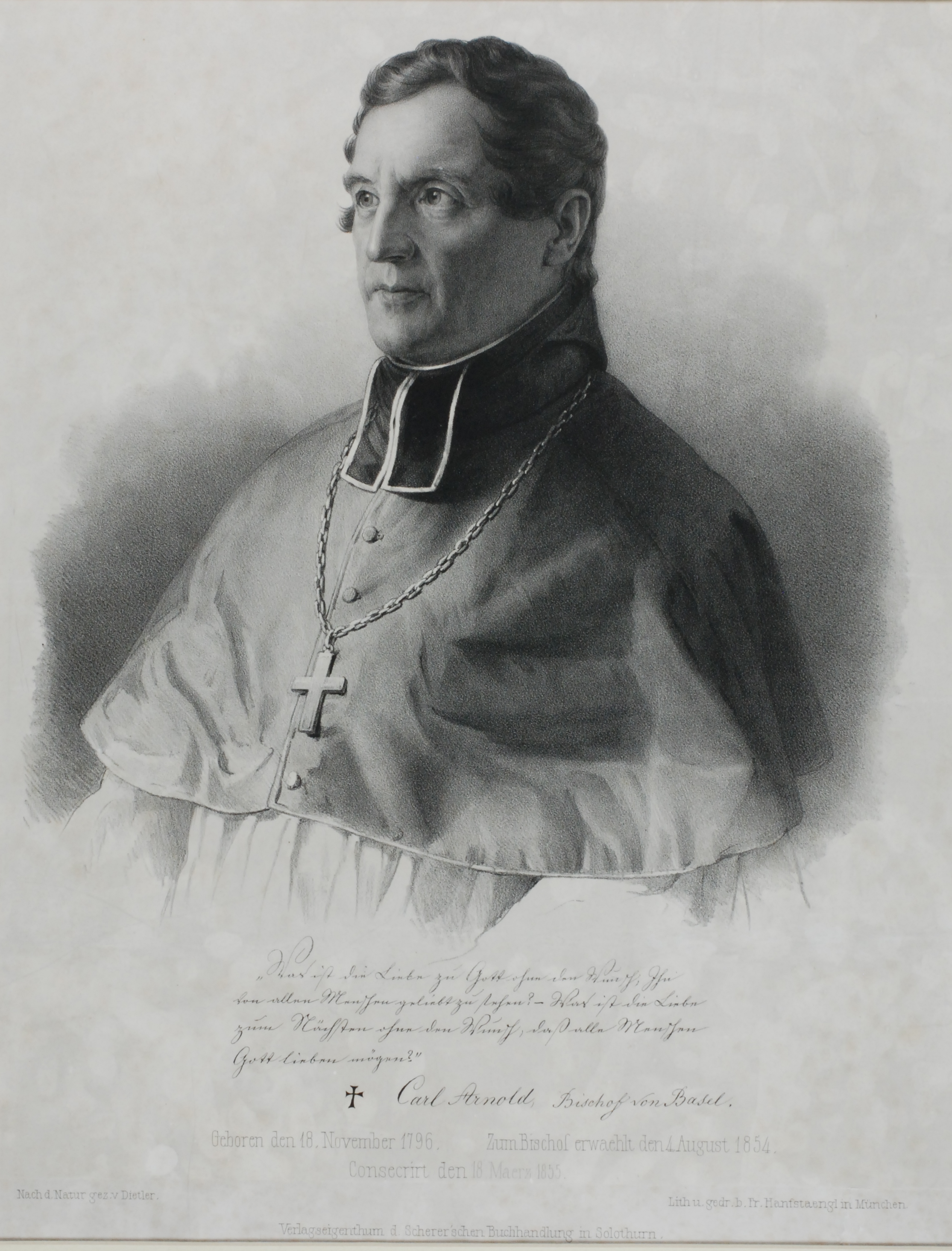
- Karl Arnold-Obrist, Lithografie, 1815
- Church: Catholic Church
- Diocese: Diocese of Basel
- In office: 16 November 1854 – 17 December 1862
- Predecessor: Joseph Anton Salzmann
- Successor: Eugène Lachat

Orders
- Ordination: 23 September 1820
- Consecration: 18 March 1855 by Johann Peter Mirer

Personal details
- Born: 18 November 1796 Solothurn, Canton of Solothurn, Switzerland
- Died: 17 December 1862 (aged 66) Solothurn, Canton of Solothurn, Switzerland

Karl Arnold-Obrist (born 18 November 1796; died 17 December 1862, both in Solothurn) was a Swiss Catholic clergyman and bishop of the Diocese of Basel. He was ordained in 1820. He was appointed bishop in 1854. He died in 1862.

The son of a Solothurn city councillor and merchant, he attended the former Jesuit college in his home town, which had been nationalised since 1773 and is now the Solothurn Cantonal School, as well as the theological institute. In 1819 he transferred to the Saint-Sulpice seminary in Paris and was ordained a priest there in 1820. After pastoral positions in Kappel SO and Hägendorf, he became a canon in Solothurn in 1828 and preacher at the collegiate church, today's St. Ursen Cathedral, in 1831. On 4 August 1854 he was elected Bishop of Basel and confirmed by Pope Pius IX on 16 November of the same year. On 18 March 1855 he received episcopal ordination from the Bishop of St. Gallen, Johann Peter Mirer.

In 1860, Arnold-Obrist opened a diocesan seminary in Solothurn and the following year carried out the first visitation of his diocese since 1828.
