= Friedrich Ludwig Franz von Wangen zu Geroldseck =

- Bishop of Basel
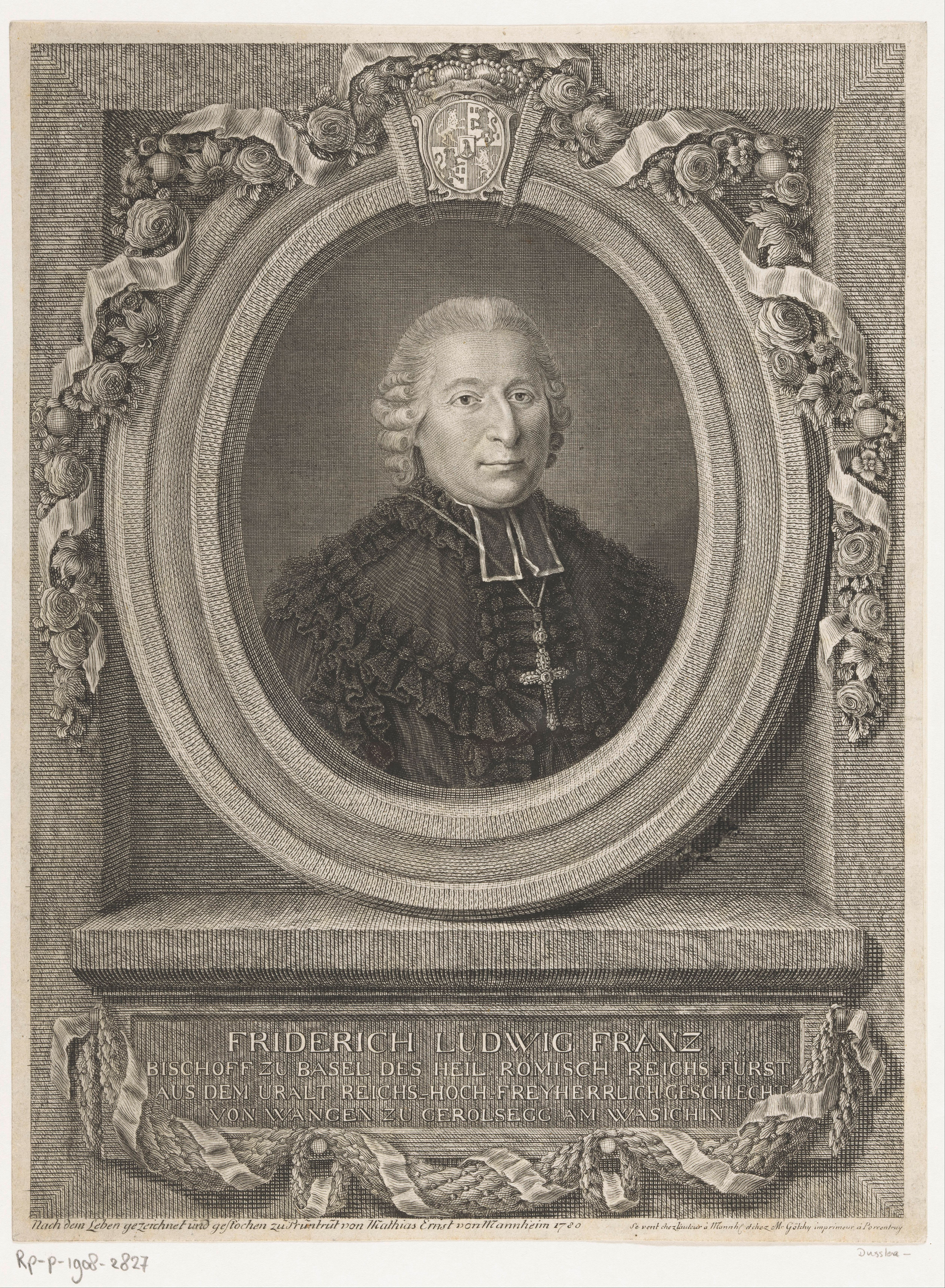
- Portrait of Friedrich Ludwig Franz von Wangen zu Geroldseck by Karl Matthias Ernst (1780)
- Church: Catholic Church
- Diocese: Diocese of Basel
- In office: 13 November 1775 – 11 October 1782
- Predecessor: Simon Nikolaus Euseb von Montjoye-Hirsingen
- Successor: Franz Joseph Sigismund von Roggenbach

Orders
- Ordination: 15 March 1766
- Consecration: 3 March 1776 by Jean-Baptiste-Joseph Gobel

Personal details
- Born: 12 March 1727 Wilwisheim, Holy Roman Empire
- Died: 11 October 1782 (aged 55)

Friedrich Ludwig Franz Reichsfreiherr von Wangen zu Geroldseck (1727–1782) was the Prince-Bishop of Basel from 1775 to 1782.

== Biography ==
Friedrich Ludwig Franz Reichsfreiherr von Wangen zu Geroldseck was born in Wilwisheim on 12 March 1727.

He was ordained as a priest on 15 March 1766.

On 29 May 1775 the cathedral chapter of Basel Münster elected him to be the new Prince-Bishop of Basel, with Pope Pius VI confirming his appointment on 13 November 1775. He was consecrated as bishop by Jean-Baptiste-Joseph Gobel, auxiliary bishop of Basel, on 3 March 1776.

He died on 11 October 1782.

Catholic Church titles
Preceded by Simon Nikolaus Euseb von Montjoye-Hirsingen	Prince-Bishop of Basel; 1775–1782	Succeeded by Franz Joseph Sigismund von Roggenbach
