= François Christoph Joseph de Ramschwag =

Official of the Prince-Bishopric of Basel (1689–1761)

- Born: 3 December 1689; Kipfenberg, Bavaria
- Died: 14 August 1761 (aged 71); Günzburg, Bavaria
- Occupation: Court official
- Spouse: Maria Sophia Esther von Reinach-Hirtzbach

François Christoph Joseph de Ramschwag, in German Franz Christoph Joseph von Ramschwag (3 December 1689 – 14 August 1761), was an official of the Prince-Bishopric of Basel who later entered the service of the Holy Roman Emperor.

== Biography ==
Ramschwag was born on 3 December 1689 at Kipfenberg in Bavaria, the son of Franz Ferdinand von Ramschwag, a councillor of the prince-bishop of Eichstätt, and Maria Viktoria von Remchingen; he was a citizen of St. Gallen. He held the titles of baron of Ramschwag and lord of Gutenberg. In 1723 he married Maria Sophia Esther, baroness of Reinach-Hirtzbach, niece of Johann Konrad von Reinach.

Ramschwag entered the service of the prince-bishop of Basel in 1716, becoming a privy councillor in 1724 and president of the aulic council in 1729. During the unrest in the prince-bishopric of Basel, he was sent to Vienna in 1731, where his subversive activity led the emperor to decide, on 10 January 1736, against the demands of the prince-bishopric's estates. He thereupon entered the service of the emperor as a privy councillor and bailiff of the Margraviate of Burgau.

== Bibliography ==
- C. Bosshart-Pfluger, Das Basler Domkapitel von seiner Übersiedlung nach Arlesheim bis zur Säkularisation (1678–1803), 1983, 75
- R. Ballmer, Les États du pays, ou les assemblées d'États dans l'ancien évêché de Bâle, 1985, 127

=== Archives ===
- Archives cantonales jurassiennes (ARCJ), Fonds André Rais
