= Philipp Gmür =

Swiss lawyer and insurance manager (born 1963)

Philipp Gmür (born 16 April 1963, Lucerne, Switzerland) is a Swiss lawyer and insurance manager. Since September 1, 2016 he is the CEO of the Helvetia Insurance Group.

== Education ==
Gmür holds an MA from the Duke University School of Law in Durham, North Carolina and a doctorate in law from the University of Freiburg and is also a registered lawyer. In 2008, Gmür attended the six-week Advanced Management Program at Harvard Business School in Boston, Massachusetts.

== Career ==
Gmür initially held various roles before he started to work for Helvetia Insurances Switzerland in 1993. Between 1991 and 1993 he worked as court clerk at the Lucerne High Court. After assuming responsibility for the Lucerne general agency in 1995, a variety of management positions at Helvetia Insurances Switzerland in Basel followed. For instance, from 2000 to 2002, he oversaw Sales Management as member of the management board and from 2003 until 2016 he served as CEO of Helvetia Insurances Switzerland and was on the board of directors of the Helvetia Group. In September 2016 Gmür became CEO of the Helvetia Holding AG. He was responsible for the business strategy Helvetia 20.20. which was introduced in 2016.

During his time with Helvetia Insurances Switzerland, Gmür initiated various acquisitions of Swiss insurance companies such as the acquisition of Alba Allgemeine Versicherungs-Gesellschaft AG, of Phenix Versicherungsgesellschaft AG and of Phenix Lebensversicherungsgesellschaft AG in 2010. He also successfully initiated the acquisition of Nationale Suisse in 2014. In 2016 Helvetia acquired under this management a majority stake in the online mortgage broker MoneyPark. In addition, the company strengthened its market position in Spain at the beginning of 2020, thereby further expanding its business activities in Europe as the second pillar of the Group. Under Gmür, Helvetia acquired a majority stake of 70 per cent of the Spanish insurance company Caser for CHF 866 million.

For his communication within the takeover of the Nationale Suisse Insurance and for his leadership and influence on those involved Gmür received the 2016 Communicator of the year Award from the Swiss Association for Internal and Integrated Communication (Schweizerischer Verband für interne und integrierte Kommunikation, SVIK).

== Other affiliations ==
Gmür is member of the Board of Directors of the Swiss Insurance Association (SIA) and of economiesuisse. He is President of the Funding Society of the Institute of Insurance Economics at the University of St. Gallen, a member of the board of trustees of Avenir Suisse and a member of the steering committee of digitalswitzerland. He is a member of the board of directors of Allreal Holding AG since 2019 and Grand Casino Luzern AG since 2008. In May 2024, the board appointed him president of Casino Luzern.

== Associations ==
Gmür has been a member of the student fraternity AKV Alemannia and therefore of the Swiss Student Association since his student days.

As an active member of the Zunft zu Safran guild, in 2008 Philipp Gmür held the position of guild master and Fritschivater during the traditional Fritschiraub. For people living in the city of Lucerne, the Fritschivater is considered to be highest ranking Lucerner during carnival.

== Family ==
Philipp Gmür is married to the politician Andrea Gmür-Schönenberger. They have four children. One of his brothers is Felix Gmür, Bishop of Basel.
