= Johann Konrad von Roggenbach =

- Bishop of Basel
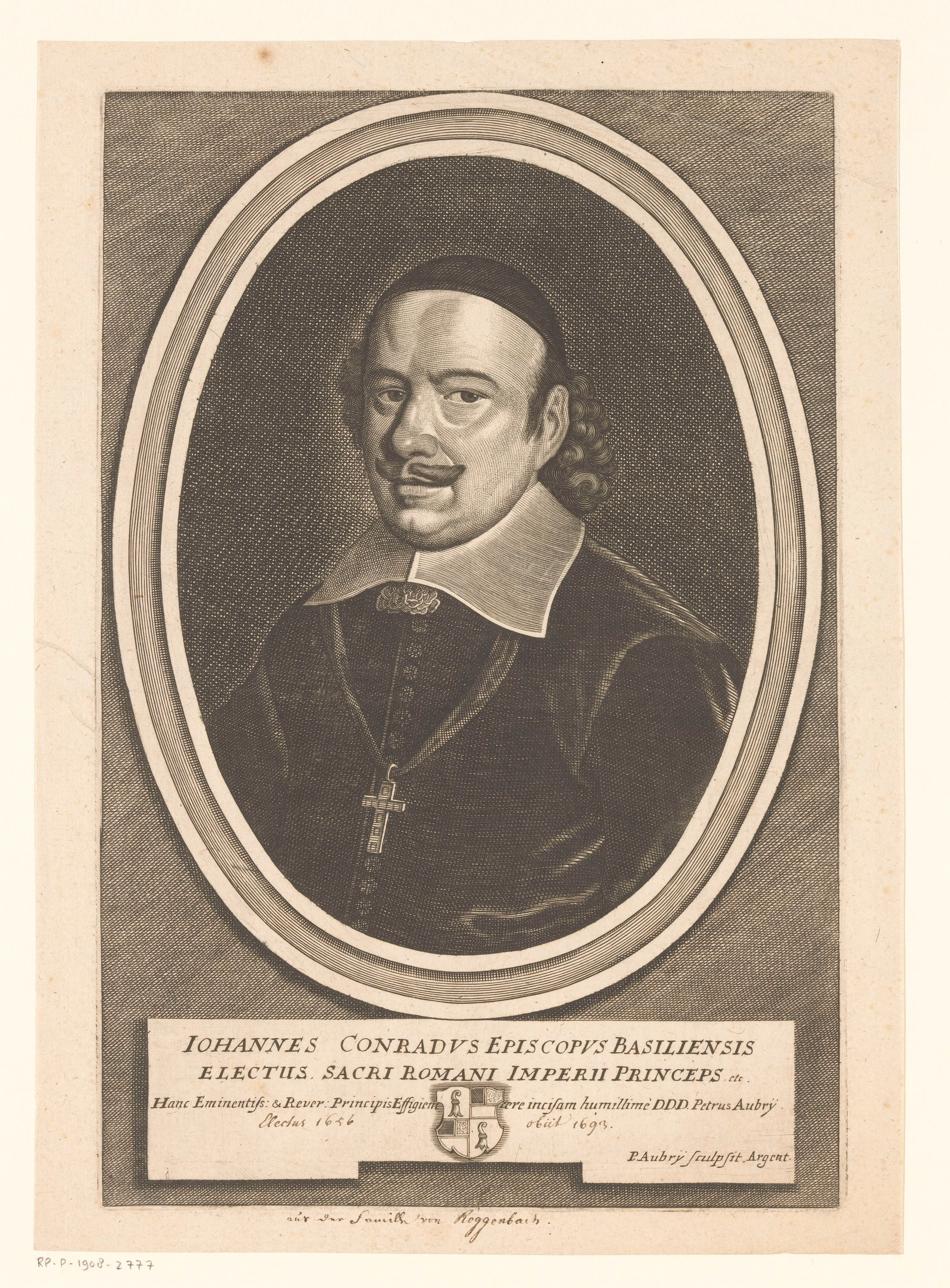
- Church: Catholic Church
- Diocese: Diocese of Basel
- In office: 13 January 1659 – 13 July 1693
- Predecessor: Johann Franz von Schönau-Zell
- Successor: Wilhelm Jakob Rink von Baldenstein

Orders
- Ordination: 4 April 1654
- Consecration: 23 March 1659 by Federico Borromeo (Jr.)

Personal details
- Born: 15 December 1618 Schopfheim, Margraviate of Baden-Durlach, Swabian Circle, Holy Roman Empire
- Died: 13 July 1693 (aged 74) Porrentruy, Prince-Bishopric of Basel, Upper Rhenish Circle, Holy Roman Empire

Johann Konrad von Roggenbach (1618–1693) was the Prince-Bishop of Basel from 1656 to 1693.

== Biography ==
Johann Konrad von Roggenbach was born in Schopfheim on 15 December 1618. He was ordained as a priest on 4 April 1654.

On 22 December 1656 the cathedral chapter of Basel Münster elected him to be the new Prince-Bishop of Basel. Pope Alexander VII confirmed his appointment on 13 January 1658, and he was consecrated as a bishop by Federico Borromeo (iuniore) on 23 March 1659.

He died on 13 July 1693.

Catholic Church titles
Preceded by Johann Franz von Schönau-Zell	Prince-Bishop of Basel; 1656–1693	Succeeded by Wilhelm Jakob Rink von Baldenstein
