= Joseph Wilhelm Rinck von Baldenstein (bailiff) =

Administrator of the Prince-Bishopric of Basel (1672–1752)

- Born: 8 November 1672
- Died: 23 June 1752 (aged 79); Delémont, Prince-Bishopric of Basel
- Occupation: Administrator
- Spouse: Marie Claudine Antoinette von Ramschwag
- Children: Joseph Wilhelm Rinck von Baldenstein

Joseph Wilhelm Rinck von Baldenstein, in French Joseph Guillaume Rinck de Baldenstein (8 November 1672 – 23 June 1752), was an administrator in the service of the Prince-Bishopric of Basel.

== Biography ==
Rinck von Baldenstein was born on 8 November 1672, the son of Georg Wilhelm Rinck von Baldenstein and nephew of Franz Christoph Rinck von Baldenstein. In 1698 he married Marie Claudine Antoinette von Ramschwag, daughter of Franz Ferdinand von Ramschwag, a councillor of the prince-bishop of Eichstätt; he was thereby the brother-in-law of Franz Christian Joseph von Ramschwag. He studied philosophy at Konstanz from 1689 to 1692.

In 1698 Rinck von Baldenstein was a palatine councillor of the prince-abbot of Saint Gall. From 1702 he entered the service of the bishop of Basel as bailiff of Saint-Ursanne and of the Franches-Montagnes, and from 1720 also of Delémont and Moutier-Grandval. He was an aulic councillor and, in 1730, the prince's commissioner at the assembly of the estates.

== Bibliography ==
- P. Braun, Joseph Wilhelm Rinck von Baldenstein (1704–1762), 1981, 30–38
