= Wilhelm Rink von Baldenstein =

- Bishop of Basel
- Church: Catholic Church
- Diocese: Diocese of Basel
- In office: 4 February 1609 – 23 October 1628
- Predecessor: Jakob Christoph Blarer von Wartensee
- Successor: Johann Heinrich von Ostein

Orders
- Consecration: 12 July 1609 by Ladislao d'Aquino

Personal details
- Born: 1566
- Died: 23 October 1628 (aged 61–62)

Wilhelm Rink von Baldenstein was the Prince-Bishop of Basel from 1608 to 1628.

Catholic Church titles
Preceded by Jakob Christoph Blarer von Wartensee	Prince-Bishop of Basel; 1608–1628	Succeeded by Johann Heinrich von Ostein
