= Johann Heinrich von Ostein =

- Bishop of Basel
- Church: Catholic Church
- Diocese: Diocese of Basel
- In office: 20 August 1629 – 26 November 1646
- Predecessor: Wilhelm Rink von Baldenstein
- Successor: Beat Albrecht von Ramstein

Orders
- Consecration: 25 November 1629 by Jean Bernard d’Angeloch

Personal details
- Born: 1579
- Died: 26 November 1646 (aged 66–67) Delsberg, Prince-Bishopric of Basel, Upper Rhenish Circle, Holy Roman Empire

Johann Heinrich von Ostein (1579–1646) was the Prince-Bishop of Basel from 1628 to 1646.

Catholic Church titles
Preceded by Wilhelm Rink von Baldenstein	Prince-Bishop of Basel; 1628–1646	Succeeded by Beat Albrecht von Ramstein
