= Johann Franz von Schönau-Zell =

- Bishop of Basel
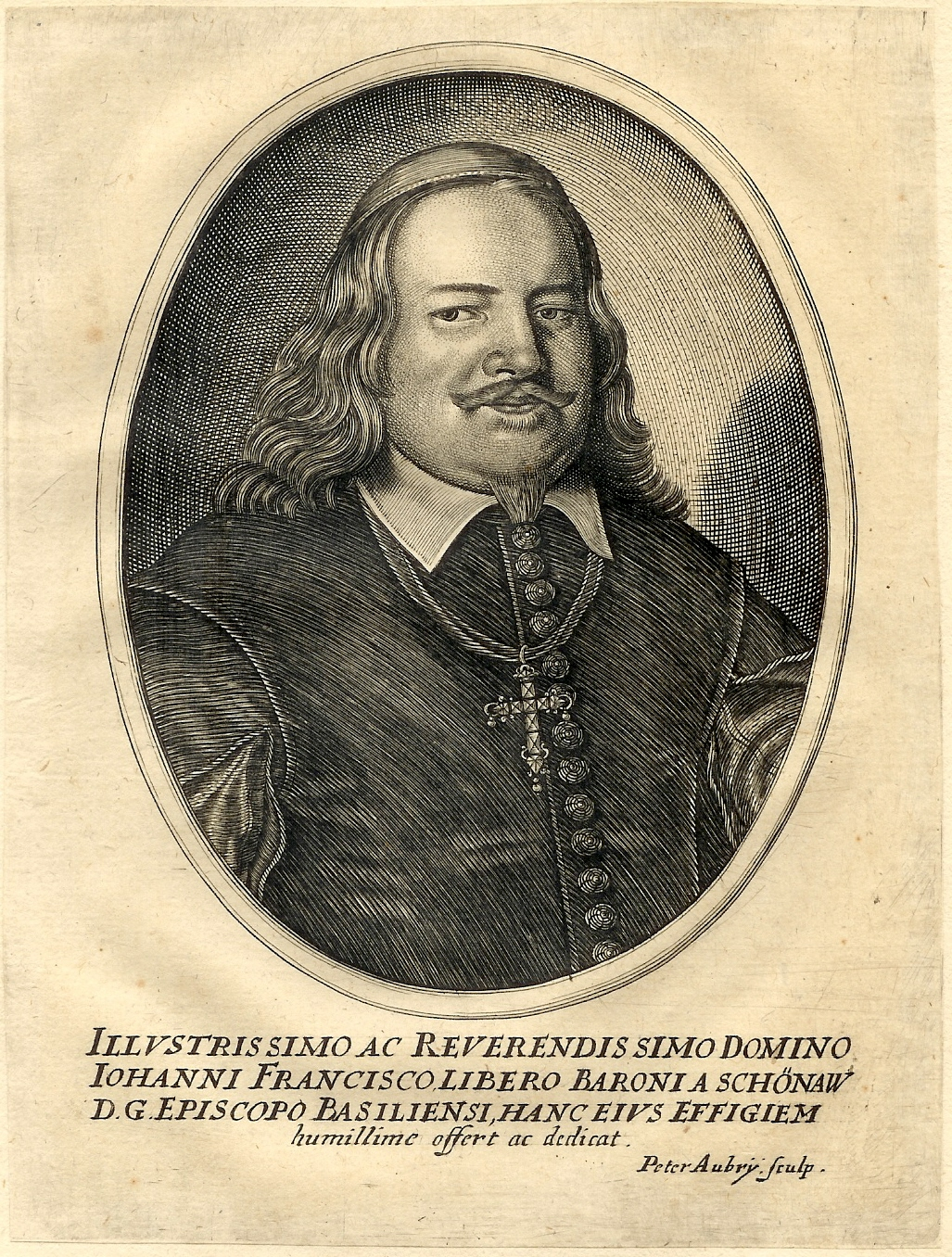
- Church: Catholic Church
- Diocese: Diocese of Basel
- In office: 3 March 1653 – 30 November 1656
- Predecessor: Beat Albrecht von Ramstein
- Successor: Johann Konrad von Roggenbach

Orders
- Ordination: 15 April 1648
- Consecration: 15 June 1653 by Thomas Henrici

Personal details
- Born: 15 July 1619 Ensisheim, Landgraviate of Upper Alsace, Holy Roman Empire
- Died: 30 November 1656 (aged 37) Porrentruy, Prince-Bishopric of Basel, Upper Rhenish Circle, Holy Roman Empire

Johann Franz Reichsritter von Schönau-Zell (1619–1656) was the Prince-Bishop of Basel from 1651 to 1656.

== Biography ==
Johann Franz von Schönau-Zell was born in Ensisheim on 15 July 1619, the son of Marx Jakob von Schönau and of Margaretha von Reinach. He spent his childhood in Waldshut after his father became bailiff of the local forest there. His father set on a career in the clergy for his younger son. The boy studied at Porrentruy, the University of Freiburg, Lucerne, and at the Collegium Germanicum in Rome.

He was ordained as a priest on 15 April 1648. On 18 September 1648 the cathedral chapter of Basel Münster elected him to be Prince-Bishop of Basel. Pope Innocent X confirmed the appointment on 3 March 1653. Thomas Henrici, auxiliary bishop of Basel on 15 June 1653.

He died in Porrentruy on 30 November 1656. He received heart-burial.

Catholic Church titles
Preceded by Beat Albrecht von Ramstein	Prince-Bishop of Basel; 1653–1656	Succeeded by Johann Konrad von Roggenbach
