= Wilhelm Jakob Rink von Baldenstein =

- Bishop of Basel
- Church: Catholic Church
- Diocese: Diocese of Basel
- In office: 13 July 1693 – 4 June 1705
- Predecessor: Johann Konrad von Roggenbach
- Successor: Johann Konrad von Reinach-Hirtzbach
- Previous posts: Titular Bishop of Curium (1690-1693); Coadjutor Bishop of Basel (1690-1693)

Orders
- Ordination: 23 September 1651
- Consecration: 26 August 1691 by Franz Christoph Rinck von Baldenstein

Personal details
- Born: 10 January 1624 Birseck Castle, Canton of Basel, Swiss Confederacy
- Died: 4 June 1705 (aged 81)

Wilhelm Jakob Rink von Baldenstein (1624–1705) was the Prince-Bishop of Basel from 1693 to 1705.

== Biography ==
Wilhelm Jakob Rink von Baldenstein was born in Birseck Castle on 10 January 1624.

On 3 August 1688 the cathedral chapter of Basel Münster elected him to be coadjutor bishop of Basel. On 27 September 1690 Pope Alexander VIII confirmed this appointment and also named Baldenstein titular bishop of Curium at the same time. He was consecrated as a bishop by Franz Christoph Rinck von Balderstein, auxiliary bishop of Eichstätt, on 26 August 1691. He succeeded as Prince-Bishop of Basel upon the death of Bishop Johann Konrad von Roggenbach on 13 July 1693.

He died on 4 June 1705.

Catholic Church titles
Preceded by Johann Konrad von Roggenbach	Prince-Bishop of Basel; 1693–1705	Succeeded by Johann Konrad von Reinach-Hirtzbach
