= Kurt Koch =

Swiss Roman Catholic cardinal (born 1950)

His Eminence Kurt Koch
- President of the Dicastery for Promoting Christian Unity
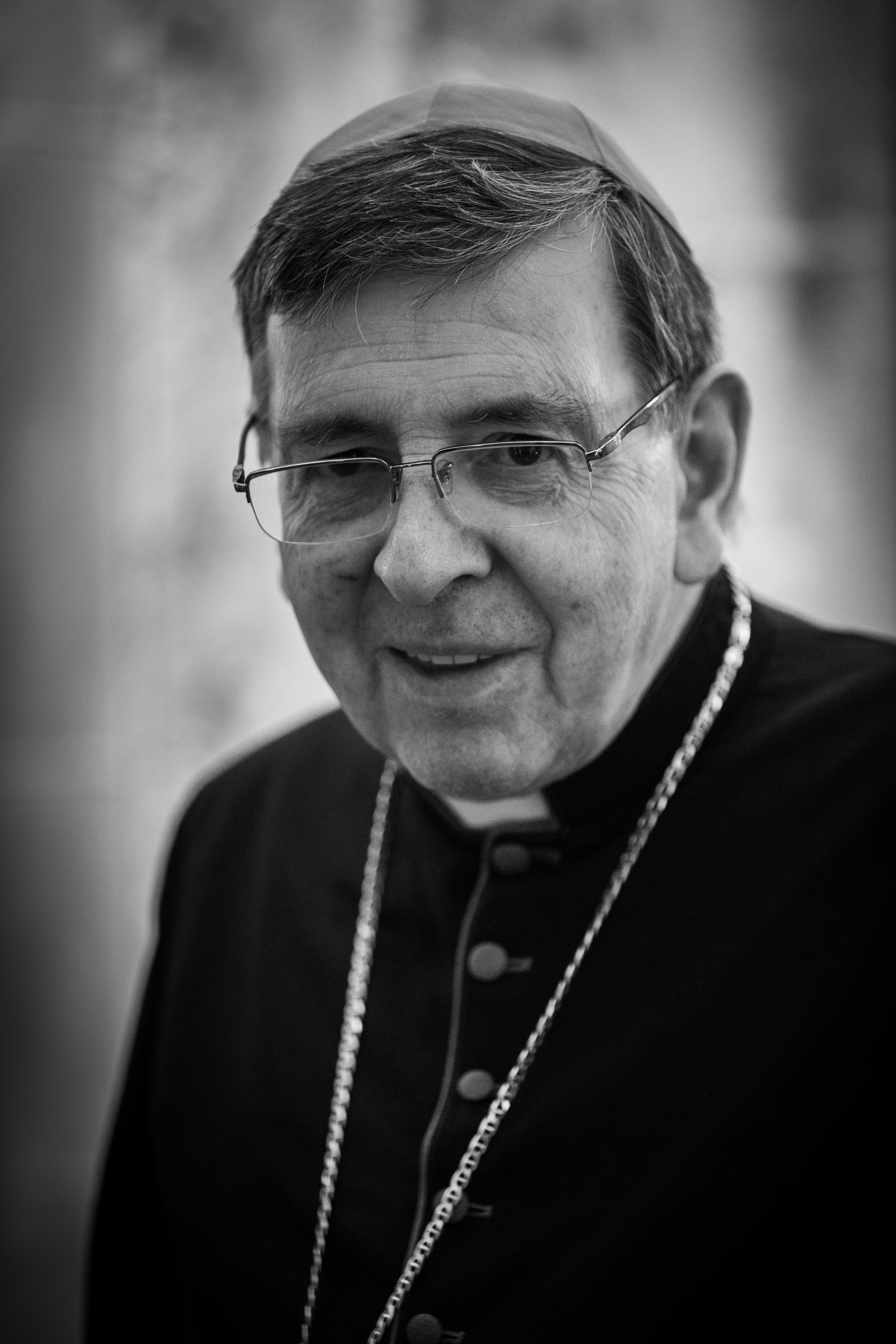
- Koch pictured in December 2016.
- Church: Roman Catholic Church
- Appointed: 1 July 2010
- Predecessor: Walter Kasper
- Other posts: President of the Commission for Religious Relations with the Jews (2010-); Cardinal-Priest 'pro hac vice' of Nostra Signora del Sacro Cuore (2021-)
- Previous posts: Bishop of Basel (1996–2010); President of the Swiss Episcopal Conference (2006-09); Apostolic Administrator of Basel (2010); Cardinal-Deacon of Nostra Signora del Sacro Cuore (2010-21)

Orders
- Ordination: 20 June 1982 by Otto Wüst
- Consecration: 6 January 1996 by Pope John Paul II
- Created cardinal: 20 November 2010 by Pope Benedict XVI
- Rank: Cardinal-Deacon (2010-21); Cardinal-Priest (2021-)

Personal details
- Born: Kurt Koch; 15 March 1950 (age 76) Emmenbrücke, Switzerland
- Denomination: Catholic (Roman Rite)
- Education: LMU Munich; University of Lucerne
- Motto: Latin: Ut sit in omnibus Christus primatum tenens
- Coat of arms: Kurt Koch's coat of arms

Styles of Kurt Koch
- Reference style: His Eminence
- Spoken style: Your Eminence
- Informal style: Cardinal
- See: Basel (Emeritus)

Kurt Koch (born 15 March 1950) is a Swiss prelate of the Catholic Church. He has been a cardinal since November 2010 and president of the Dicastery for Promoting Christian Unity since 1 July 2010. He was the bishop of Basel from 1996 until 2010.

== Personal background ==
Koch was born in Emmenbrücke in the canton of Lucerne. He studied theology at LMU Munich and at the University of Lucerne, graduating in 1975 with a Doctor of Theology degree. He was ordained to the priesthood on 20 June 1982.

== Bishop of Basel ==
Koch was appointed Bishop of Basel on 6 December 1995. He received episcopal consecration on 6 January 1996 from John Paul II himself, with Archbishops Giovanni Battista Re and Jorge María Mejía serving as co-consecrators.

When a group of Swiss intellectuals and theologians called for John Paul's resignation on 20 May 2004, on the occasion of his 84th birthday, Koch described it as "disgusting and disloyal". In 2006, he supported the freedom of Muslims to build minarets in Switzerland, but also asked for greater religious freedom for Christians in Muslim countries.

On 27 June 2007, Koch, along with several other Catholic prelates, attended a briefing from the Cardinal Secretary of State, Tarcisio Bertone, at the Apostolic Palace on Pope Benedict XVI's forthcoming allowing wider celebration of the Tridentine Mass.

In July 2007, Koch defended the Congregation for the Doctrine of the Faith's document "Responses to Some Questions Regarding Certain Aspects of the Doctrine on the Church." He acknowledged that the document could appear confusing or hurtful to Protestants. He said the document's reception showed the difference between the ecumenical goals of Catholics and the Orthodox on the one hand and that of Protestants on the other.

Koch was President of the Swiss Episcopal Conference from 2007 until 2010. He is a member of the Swiss Council of Religions.

== Pontifical Council for Promoting Christian Unity ==
Pope Benedict XVI announced the appointment of Koch as president of the Pontifical Council for Promoting Christian Unity on 1 July 2010, taking over from Cardinal Walter Kasper. Koch was made archbishop as well. He commented: "The Holy Father told me in February, in a personal audience, his desire that I would begin to lead this council. It is a great joy for me because ecumenism has always been in my heart since in my country, Switzerland, Protestants are very close to us and I have also had a particular interest in the Orthodox Churches."

On 16 October 2010, Pope Benedict appointed Koch as a member of the Congregation for the Doctrine of the Faith for a five-year renewable term.

On 20 October 2010, Pope Benedict made him Cardinal-Deacon of Nostra Signora del Sacro Cuore.

On 29 December 2010, Koch was appointed a member of the Congregation for the Oriental Churches and the Pontifical Council for Interreligious Dialogue.

Koch headed the Vatican's delegation to Istanbul, Turkey to the Ecumenical Patriarch of Constantinople, Patriarch Bartholomew I, for the Feast of Saint Andrew the Apostle on 30 November 2010 (the Patriarchate sends a delegation each year in turn for the Solemnity of the Holy Apostles Saint Peter and Saint Paul on 29 June). He co-presided over a meeting of the Joint International Commission for Theological Dialogue Between the Catholic Church and the Orthodox Church in Vienna, Austria in September 2010 with Metropolitan John Zizioulas of Pergamon.

On 4 May 2011 Pope Benedict appointed Koch a member of the Congregation for the Causes of Saints. The five-year term will be renewed until his 80th birthday.

In his role as president of the Pontifical Commission for Religious Relations with the Jews, Koch spoke to reporters on 16 May 2011, after delivering a speech on Catholic-Jewish relations in light of Vatican II's declaration Nostra aetate on the Church's relations with non-Christian religions. The speech followed Koch's participation in a meeting of the doctrinal congregation to examine the latest progress in the Vatican's reconciliation talks with the traditionalist Society of Saint Pius X. "There are questions to clarify in discussions with this community. I can't say more than that", he told reporters, echoing a Vatican statement saying the reconciliation talks are ongoing. Koch noted that "All the doctrinal decisions of the church are binding on a Catholic, including the Second Vatican Council and all its texts", Koch said when asked if the SSPX would be expected to accept all the teachings of Vatican II. "The Nostra aetate declaration of the Second Vatican Council is a clear decree and is important for every Catholic", he added.

16 May 2012, Koch gave the Pope John Paul II Lecture on Interreligious Understanding at the Pontifical University of Saint Thomas Aquinas (Angelicum). Koch spoke on the theme of "Building on Nostra aetate: 50 Years of Christian-Jewish Dialogue".

On 30 October 2012, Koch stated in an interview that, if Lutherans express a wish for an arrangement similar to the personal ordinariates for former Anglicans, the Catholic Church will have to reflect on it, but that the initiative must come from Lutherans.

He was one of the cardinal electors who participated in the 2013 papal conclave that elected Pope Francis.

On Saturday, 30 November 2013, Pope Francis named Cardinal Koch a Member of the Congregation for Catholic Education. He was appointed a member of the Congregation for Bishops.

After ten years at the rank of cardinal deacon, he exercised his option to assume the rank of cardinal priest, which Pope Francis confirmed on 3 May 2021.

He was once again a cardinal elector in the 2025 papal conclave that elected Pope Leo XIV.

In a 2025 letter addressed to Bishop Sarah Mullally, Cardinal Koch, offered his congratulations and expressed the Catholic Church’s support for her new ministry as Archbishop of Canterbury. He showed a more critical view of her appointment, in November 2025, and of the current divisions in the Anglican Communion, with the development of the Global Anglican Future Conference, expressing his uncertainty about with whom the Catholic Church should direct more its ecumenism in the future. He said: “Who will we dialogue with in the future if the Anglican world community is so divided?”

== Aid to the Church in Need ==
In 2025 Cardinal Koch was named president of pontifical foundation Aid to the Church in Need, succeeding Cardinal Mauro Piacenza in the position.

He later said: “I accepted this mission with great joy because ACN has always been very close to my heart. It is a pontifical foundation that does immense good while constantly reminding us how many parts of the Church are living in situations of great need. To contribute to this mission is something very important to me.”

During his first visit to the headquarters of the foundation, in Koenigstein, Germany, he stressed that spiritual support is more important than material aid, saying that "whoever does not give people God is giving them too little", a quote he attributed to Benedict XVI.

Catholic Church titles
Preceded by Hansjörg Vogel	Bishop of Basel; 6 December 1995 – 1 July 2010	Succeeded by Felix Gmür
Preceded by Amédée Grab	President of the Swiss Episcopal Conference; 2006 – 2009	Succeeded by Norbert Brunner
Preceded by Walter Kasper	President of the Pontifical Council for Promoting Christian Unity; 1 July 2010 –	Incumbent
Preceded by José Saraiva Martins	Cardinal-Deacon of Nostra Signora del Sacro Cuore; 20 November 2010 –	Incumbent
