= Franz Xaver von Neveu =

Swiss Prince-Bishop (1749–1828)

- Prince-Bishop of Basel
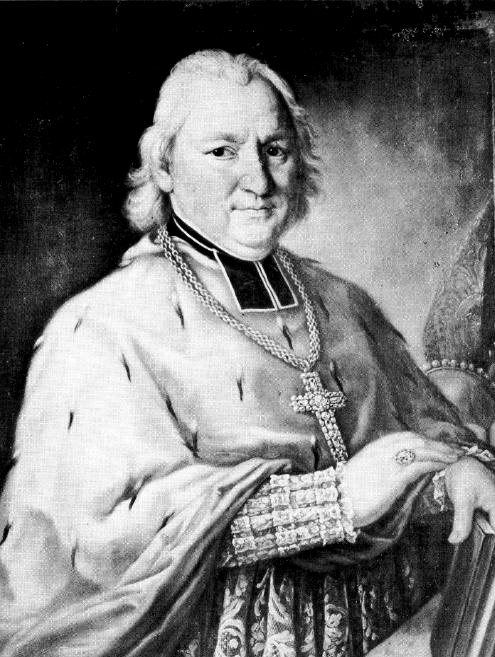
- Church: Catholic Church
- Diocese: Diocese of Basel
- In office: 12 September 1794 – 23 August 1828
- Predecessor: Franz Joseph Sigismund von Roggenbach
- Successor: Joseph Anton Salzmann
- Other post: Apostolic Administrator of Besançon (1795-1801)

Orders
- Ordination: 15 March 1777
- Consecration: 23 November 1794 by Wilhelm Joseph Leopold Willibald von Baden

Personal details
- Born: 26 February 1749 Birseck Castle, Prince-Bishopric of Basel, Upper Rhenish Circle, Holy Roman Empire
- Died: 23 August 1828 (aged 79) Offenburg, Grand Duchy of Baden, German Confederation

Franz Xaver Freiherr von Neveu (26 February 1749 – 23 August 1828) was a Swiss prince and bishop. He was Prince-Bishop of Basel, reigning from 1794 to 1803. After the Prince-Bishopric of Basel was mediatised to the Margraviate of Baden in 1803, Neveu remained Bishop of Basel, though without exercising temporal power, until his death in 1828.

== Biography ==
Franz Xaver von Neveu was born in Birseck Castle on 26 February 1749, the son of Franz Karl Ignaz Freiherr von Neveu and his wife Maria Sophia Reuttner von Weyl.

He served as a page in the court of Simon Nikolaus Euseb von Montjoye-Hirsingen, Prince Bishop of Basel, at Porrentruy, and then spent 1762-69 studying at the Jesuit gymnasium in Porrentruy. In 1769, he began his studies at the University of Strasbourg.

At Strasbourg, he was ordained as a priest on 15 March 1777. In 1789, he became a canon (Domizellar) of Basel Münster. He became a member of the cathedral chapter on 28 January 1792. The French Revolution spread into the Prince-Bishopric of Basel, with French troops entering the prince-bishopric in April 1792. Neveu and the rest of the cathedral chapter fled to Arlesheim, then to Freiburg im Breisgau.

On 2 June 1794, the cathedral chapter elected Neveu to be the new Prince-Bishop of Basel, with Pope Pius VI confirming his appointment on 12 September 1794. At the time of his election, the northern portion of the Prince-Bishopric of Basel had already been incorporated into the Rauracian Republic in December 1792. As such, Neveu's temporal authority only extended to Bellelay Abbey, Moutier-Grandval Abbey, Erguel, Orvin, Biel, La Neuveville, and Schliengen.

The Treaty of Campo Formio (18 October 1797) awarded the French First Republic a free hand in Switzerland, and on 14 December 1797 French troops occupied the remainder of the Prince-Bishopric of Basel. In 1803, this southern portion of the prince-bishopric was mediatised to the Margraviate of Baden, and Neveu lost the last of his temporal power over the prince-bishopric. He remained Bishop of Basel until his death.

He died in Offenburg on 23 August 1828, aged 79.

Catholic Church titles
Preceded by Franz Joseph Sigismund von Roggenbach	Prince-Bishop of Basel; 1794–1803	Succeeded by Prince-Bishopric mediatised to Baden 1803
Preceded by Self (as Prince-Bishop)	Bishop of Basel; 1803–1828	Succeeded by Josef Anton Salzmann
