= Franz Joseph Sigismund von Roggenbach =

Prince-Bishop of Basel

- Bishop of Basel
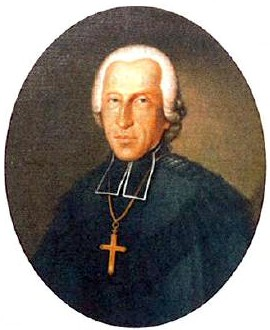
- Church: Catholic Church
- Diocese: Diocese of Basel
- In office: 18 July 1783 – 9 March 1794
- Predecessor: Friedrich Ludwig Franz von Wangen zu Geroldseck
- Successor: Franz Xaver von Neveu

Orders
- Ordination: 1 June 1765
- Consecration: 29 September 1783 by Raymond de Durfort

Personal details
- Born: 1726 Zwingen, Prince-Bishopric of Basel, Upper Rhenish Circle, Holy Roman Empire
- Died: 9 March 1794 (aged 67–68) Konstanz, Prince-Bishopric of Konstanz, Swabian Circle, Holy Roman Empire

Franz Joseph Sigismund von Roggenbach (1726–1794) was the Prince-Bishop of Basel from 1782 to 1794.

== Biography ==
Franz Joseph Sigismund von Roggenbach was born in Zwingen on 14 December 1726, the son of Franz Josef Konrad von Roggenbach and his wife Maria Anna Eva Blarer von Wartensee.

He was educated at the Jesuit gymnasium in Porrentruy. He became a canon of Basel Münster in 1742, and then became its capitulary in 1750.

On 25 November 1782 the cathedral chapter of Basel Münster unanimously elected Roggenbach to be the new Prince-Bishop of Basel, with Pope Pius VI confirming his appointment on 18 July 1783. He was consecrated as a bishop by Raymond de Durfort, Archbishop of Besançon, on 29 September 1783.

Shortly after Roggenbach's election, revolutionary activity began in the prince-bishopric, encouraged by Roggenbach's auxiliary bishop, Jean-Baptiste-Joseph Gobel, a supporter of the sans-culottes. The French Revolution eventually spread into the prince-bishopric, and, following rioting in Porrentruy, Roggenbach fled the prince-bishopric on 27 April 1792, under the protection of Austrian troops, traveling first to Delémont, then to Biel, and finally to Konstanz. On 17 December 1792 the French First Republic incorporated the northern part of the Prince-Bishopric of Basel into a new client state known as the Rauracian Republic.

Roggenbach died in Konstanz on 9 March 1794.

Catholic Church titles
Preceded by Friedrich Ludwig Franz von Wangen zu Geroldseck	Prince-Bishop of Basel; 1782–1794	Succeeded by Franz Xaver von Neveu
