= Beat Albrecht von Ramstein =

- Bishop of Basel
- Church: Catholic Church
- Diocese: Diocese of Basel
- In office: 22 August 1650 – 25 August 1651
- Predecessor: Johann Heinrich von Ostein
- Successor: Johann Franz von Schönau-Zell

Orders
- Ordination: 1647
- Consecration: 1 May 1651 by Thomas Henrici

Personal details
- Born: 14 July 1594 Waldighofen, Landgraviate of Sundgau, Austrian Circle, Holy Roman Empire
- Died: 25 August 1651 (aged 57)

Beat Albrecht von Ramstein (1594–1651) was the Prince-Bishop of Basel from 1646 to 1651.

== Biography ==
Beat Albrecht von Ramstein was born in Waldighofen on 14 July 1594.

On 29 November 1646 the cathedral chapter of the Basel Münster elected him as Prince-Bishop of Basel. He was ordained as a priest in 1647. Pope Innocent X confirmed his appointment as Bishop of Basel on 22 August 1650, and he was subsequently consecrated as a bishop by Thomas Henrici, auxiliary bishop of Basel on 1 May 1651.

He died on 25 August 1651.

Catholic Church titles
Preceded by Johann Heinrich von Ostein	Prince-Bishop of Basel; 1646–1651	Succeeded by Johann Franz von Schönau-Zell
