= Jakob Christoph Blarer von Wartensee =

Roman Catholic bishop (1542–1608)

The Right Reverend Jakob Christoph Blarer von Wartensee
- Bishop of Basel
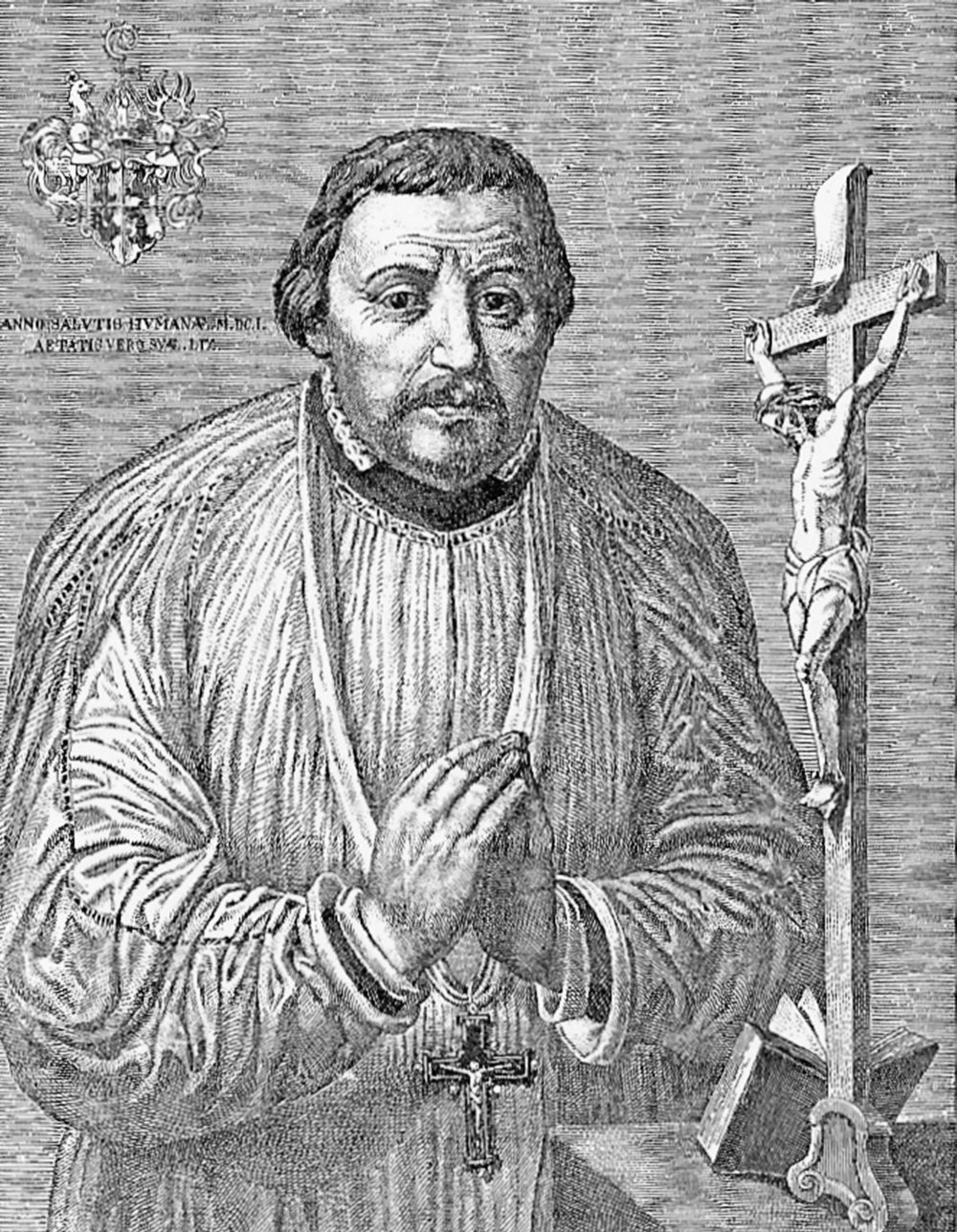
- Church: Roman Catholic
- Appointed: 4 May 1576
- Term ended: 18 April 1608
- Predecessor: Melchior von Lichtenfels
- Successor: Wilhelm Rink von Baldenstein

Orders
- Consecration: 10 February 1577 by Marcus Teggingeri

Personal details
- Born: 11 May 1542 Berneck, St. Gallen
- Died: 18 April 1608 (aged 65) Porrentruy

Jakob Christoph Blarer von Wartensee (11 May 1542 – 18 April 1608) was a Bishop of Basel and a leader in the Counter-Reformation in the region around Basel, in Switzerland.

== Early history ==
He was born at Rosenberg Castle, the son of William, Prince-abbot of St. Gall and upper Vogt of Rosenberg, and Helen of Hallwyl. Between 1557–59 he was a student at Freiburg under the humanist Heinrich Glarean. In 1555 he was appointed to the Cathedral of Constance. He became a canon in 1559, and an archdeacon in 1570. In 1561 he moved to Basel's cathedral. He was unanimously elected Bishop of Basel on 22 June 1575, and on 4 May 1576 this election was confirmed by Pope Gregory XIII. He was ordained on 10 February 1577 and was granted an Imperial investiture on 15 November 1577.

== Bishop of Basel ==
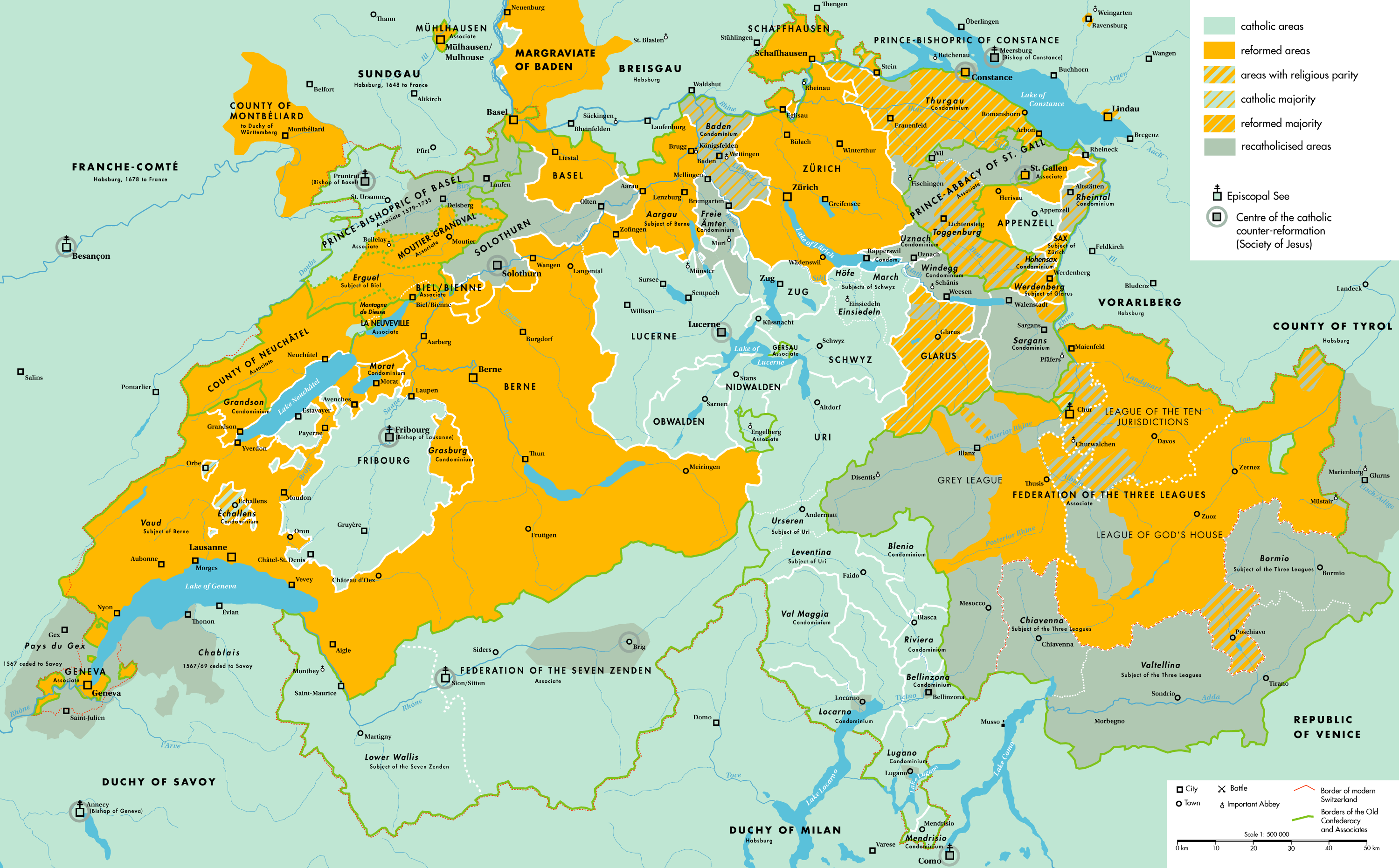
Religious divisions of the Swiss Confederation in the 17th and 18th centuries

Starting in 1576, he was planning an alliance with the Catholic cantons in order to restore the power of the Bishopric of Basel. Basel had converted to the Reformation during the first half of the 16th century. After costly negotiations and with the help of Ludwig Pfyffer von Altishofen and the nuncios Ninguarda Feliciano and Giovanni Francesco Bonomi, a catholic mutual assistance pact was signed on 28 September 1579 in Lucerne and all parties swore to uphold the pact on 11 January 1580 in Porrentruy. This provided a base of support for Blarer's goals; the Catholic renewal of the diocese's subjects, to prevent further removal of existing Burgrecht (rights between a town and the surrounding villages), the recovery of former Catholic dominions within and outside the city of Basel as well as restitution of cathedral's property.

After the oath in Porrentruy, he began to spread the Counter-Reformation into the territories that surrounded Basel and had some political ties to the city. The resulting conflict between Basel and Blarer ended up before a Swiss Confederacy arbitration court and was settled in 1585 in the Baden Agreement. In it, the Burgrecht contracts between Basel and the Laufen and Delsberger Valleys as well as Freiberg were de facto resolved. The city agreed to pay a high compensation (200,000 guilders) for the Bishop's estates which had been taken by the city during the Reformation, and in matters of faith applied the principle Cuius regio, eius religio. As early as 1590, the German bailiwicks were once Catholic. A similar agreement was concluded in 1599 with Bern which was known as the Biel Exchange. This agreement allowed for the city of Biel to be transferred to Bern, but Bern and others would waive the Burgrecht with the provost of Moutier-Grandval. However, this agreement faltered due to the opposition of the catholic cantons. The exchange finally occurred seven years later in the Treaty of 1606. In this treaty, the city provided an oath of allegiance, its influence in the Herrschaft of Erguel was restricted and the Burgrecht agreement with Bellelay Abbey was dissolved. However, Blarer's attempts to spread the Counter-Reformation to the southern bailiwicks were unsuccessful.

The targeted reform of the clergy began in 1581 with the proclamation of new statutes during the diocesan synod in Delémont. Two cycles of visitations (1586–90, 1601–04) led to the identification and elimination of irregularities in the parishes of the diocese. New liturgical books were distributed to the clergy which espoused the ideals of the Counter-Reformation. For recruiting and training new priests, he founded a Jesuit college in Porrentruy in 1591 and added a seminary in 1606. The latter, however, never really came to bloom and disappeared after a few decades. Starting in 1595, the College began to turn out Jesuits who met with great success in the diocese.

While the Baden Agreement had helped the shattered finances of the diocese, Jakob Christoph now sought to prevent renewed debt. With the reopening and expansion of the mines and iron forges in Courrendlin, Undervelier and Belle Fontaine (now part of Saint-Ursanne) he created new revenue sources. Starting in 1589 he began to mint his own money. He also began to expand the political power of the diocese by opening a print shop and expanding his residence in Porrentruy. He died, aged 65, at Porrentruy.

Catholic Church titles
Preceded by Melchior von Lichtenfels	Prince-Bishop of Basel; 1576–1608	Succeeded by Wilhelm Rink von Baldenstein
