= Hugo von Hasenburg =

Bishop of Basel from 1179 to 1180

- Bishop of Basel
- Installed: 1179
- Term ended: 1180
- Previous post: Provost of Saint-Ursanne (1173–1179)

Personal details
- Died: 15 May 1180
- Buried: Basel Minster
- Parents: Heinrich, lord of Hasenburg

Hugo von Hasenburg (died 15 May 1180) was Bishop of Basel from 1179 to 1180. A member of the Asuel family, he was a canon in Saint-Ursanne and in Basel and provost of Saint-Ursanne from 1173 to 1179.

== Biography ==
Hugo von Hasenburg was the son of Heinrich, lord of Hasenburg. He is first attested in 1145, as a canon (Chorherr) in Saint-Ursanne, and in 1169 he was a canon in Basel. From 1173 to 1179 he was provost (Propst) of Saint-Ursanne.

From 1179 to 1180 Hugo was Bishop of Basel; the only mention of his episcopate dates from April 1180. He died on 15 May 1180 and was buried in Basel Minster.

== Bibliography ==
- P. Rück, Die Urkunden der Bischöfe von Basel bis 1213, 1966, 120
- Helvetia Sacra, I/1, 174
- J.-P. Prongué, "Les seigneurs d'Asuel", in Actes de la Société jurassienne d'émulation, 1996, 229–290
