= Chiara Gmür =

Swiss alpine skier (born 1993)

Chiara Gmür (born 1993) is a former Swiss alpine skier who was a member of the Swiss B-team, specializing in the Slalom discipline. She placed 20th in a 2016 Alpine Skiing World Cup slalom in Santa Caterina on 5 January 2015.
