= Eugène Lachat =

Swiss Catholic bishop (1819–1886)

- Bishop of Basel
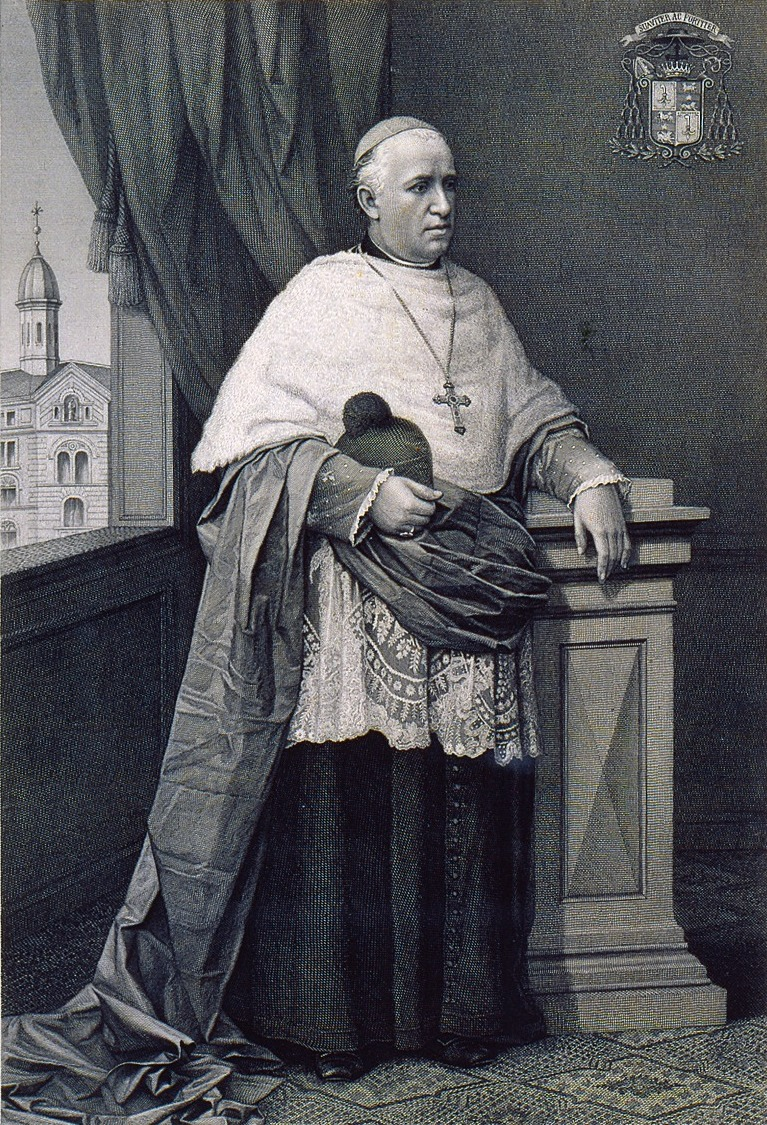
- Church: Catholic Church
- Diocese: Diocese of Basel
- In office: 1863–1885

Orders
- Ordination: 1842
- Consecration: 30 November 1863

Personal details
- Born: 14 October 1819 Montavon Farm, Haute-Ajoie, Switzerland
- Died: 1 November 1886 (aged 67) Balerna, Switzerland
- Denomination: Catholic
- Parents: François Lachat; Anne-Marie Walzer

Eugène Lachat (14 October 1819 – 1 November 1886) was a Swiss Catholic prelate who served as Bishop of Basel from 1863 to 1885. His episcopate was marked by the tensions of the Kulturkampf in Switzerland, which led to his expulsion from the Canton of Solothurn in 1873 after he published the decrees of the First Vatican Council.

== Early life and education ==
Lachat was born on 14 October 1819 at the Montavon farm in the commune of Haute-Ajoie. He was the son of François Lachat, a peasant, and Anne-Marie Walzer, and was from La Scheulte. He completed his humanities studies in Besançon under the direction of his older brother Jean-François, then studied philosophy and theology with the Missionaries of the Precious Blood at Albano Laziale, near Rome, from 1836 to 1842.

== Priesthood ==
Lachat entered the Congregation of the Precious Blood and was ordained a priest in 1842. He worked for the internal mission in Italy before returning to France. He served as priest at the pilgrimage chapel of Notre-Dame-des-Trois-Épis, near Colmar, from 1844. In 1850, he became priest at Grandfontaine, and in 1855, he was appointed dean of Delémont.

== Bishop of Basel ==
Lachat was consecrated Bishop of Basel on 30 November 1863 at Solothurn Cathedral. Initially, he maintained good relations with the liberal (radical) cantons in his diocese. However, the cordial understanding between Lachat and these cantons ended on the eve of the First Vatican Council (1869-1870) and the Kulturkampf, in a climate of heightened ultramontanism.

In 1871, Lachat published the council's decisions on the dogma of papal infallibility in his Lenten pastoral letter, despite opposition from the liberal cantons. Although Lachat himself was a moderate supporter of the dogma, his publication defied the will of these cantons. As a result, he was deposed and expelled from the Canton of Solothurn in 1873. From that point forward, Lachat administered his diocese from Lucerne. His stance earned him sympathy both in Switzerland and abroad as a "confessor of the faith."

After the easing of the Kulturkampf, Lachat resigned his position in 1885 following an invitation from Rome in 1884. This resignation allowed him to become the first apostolic administrator of Ticino and titular archbishop of Damietta.

== Death ==
Lachat died on 1 November 1886 in Balerna.
