= Wilwisheim =

- Commune
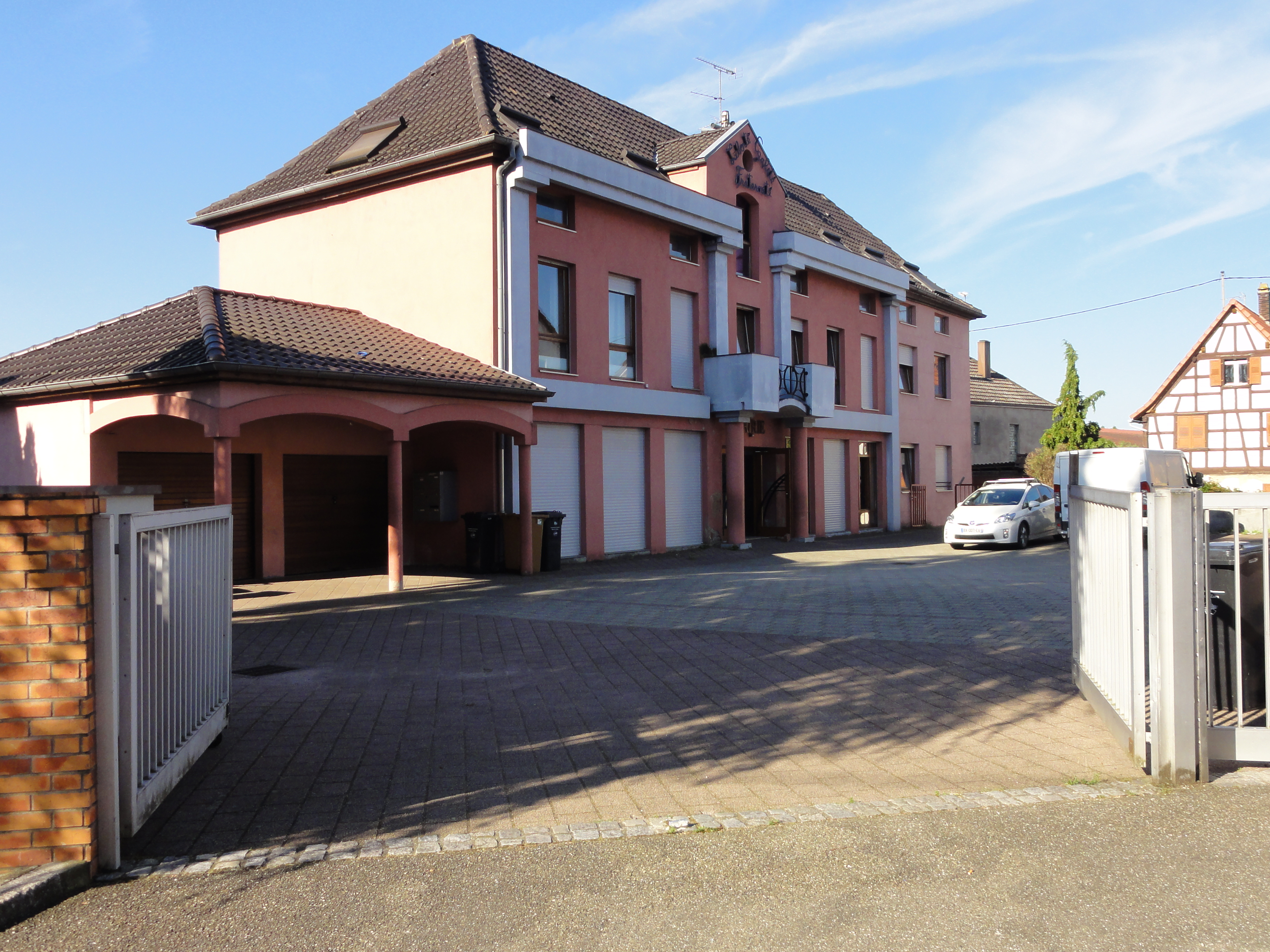
- The town hall in Wilwisheim

- Coat of arms
- Location of Wilwisheim
- Location within France Location within Grand Est
- Coordinates: 48°44′56″N 7°30′30″E
- Country: France
- Region: Grand Est
- Department: Bas-Rhin
- Arrondissement: Saverne
- Canton: Bouxwiller
- Intercommunality: Pays de la Zorn

Government
  - Mayor (2022–2026): Elodie Schmitt
- Area^{1}: 5.3 km^{2} (2.0 sq mi)
- Highest elevation: 215 m (705 ft)
- Lowest elevation: 158 m (518 ft)
- Population (2023): 772
  - Density: 150/km^{2} (380/sq mi)
- Time zone: UTC+01:00 (CET)
  - Summer (DST): UTC+02:00 (CEST)
- INSEE/Postal code: 67534 /67270
- ^{1} French Land Register data, which excludes lakes, ponds, glaciers > 1 km^{2} (0.386 sq mi or 247 acres) and river estuaries.

Wilwisheim (French pronunciation: [vilvisaim]; Alsatian: Wìlse) is a commune in the Bas-Rhin department in Grand Est in north-eastern France.

== Population ==
Historical population
Year	Pop.	±% p.a.
1968	479	—
1975	483	+0.12%
1982	512	+0.84%
1990	600	+2.00%
1999	680	+1.40%
2007	668	−0.22%
2012	711	+1.26%
2017	725	+0.39%
2023	772	+1.05%
Source: INSEE

== See also ==
- Communes of the Bas-Rhin department
