= Michelbach-le-Haut =

Commune in Grand Est, France

- Commune
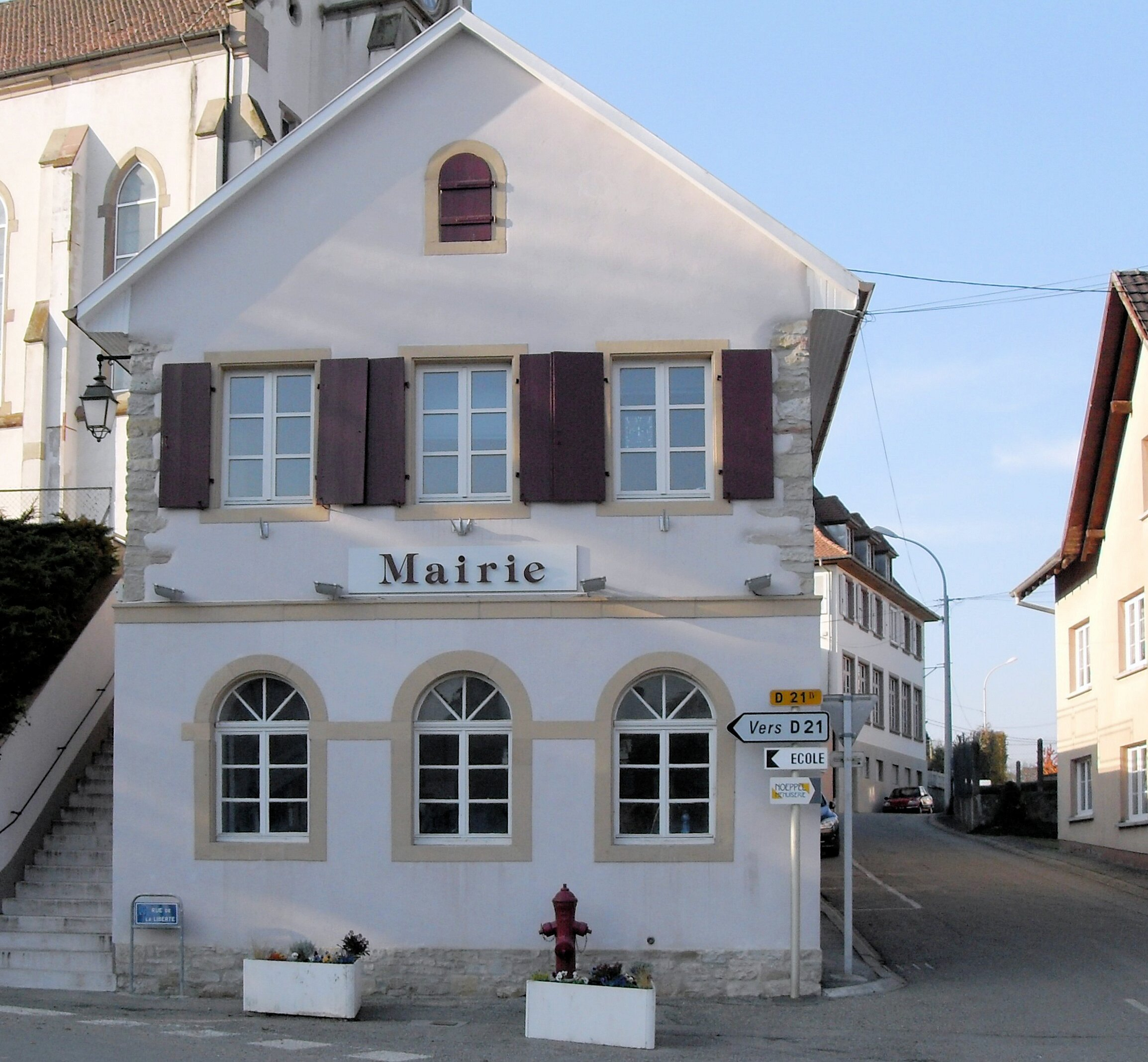
- The town hall in Michelbach-le-Haut

- Coat of arms
- Location of Michelbach-le-Haut
- Location within France Location within Grand Est
- Coordinates: 47°34′02″N 7°26′41″E
- Country: France
- Region: Grand Est
- Department: Haut-Rhin
- Arrondissement: Mulhouse
- Canton: Saint-Louis
- Intercommunality: Saint-Louis Agglomération

Government
  - Mayor (2020–2026): André Wolgensinger
- Area^{1}: 7.38 km^{2} (2.85 sq mi)
- Elevation: 350 m (1,150 ft)
- Highest elevation: 468 m (1,535 ft)
- Lowest elevation: 324 m (1,063 ft)
- Population (2023): 636
  - Density: 86.2/km^{2} (223/sq mi)
- Time zone: UTC+01:00 (CET)
  - Summer (DST): UTC+02:00 (CEST)
- INSEE/Postal code: 68208 /68220
- ^{1} French Land Register data, which excludes lakes, ponds, glaciers > 1 km^{2} (0.386 sq mi or 247 acres) and river estuaries.

Michelbach-le-Haut (German: Obermichelbach) is a commune in the Haut-Rhin department in Alsace in north-eastern France.

== See also ==
- Communes of the Haut-Rhin département
