= Diocese of Basel =

Catholic diocese in Switzerland

Diocese of Basel Diœcesis Basileensis Bistum Basel

Catholic
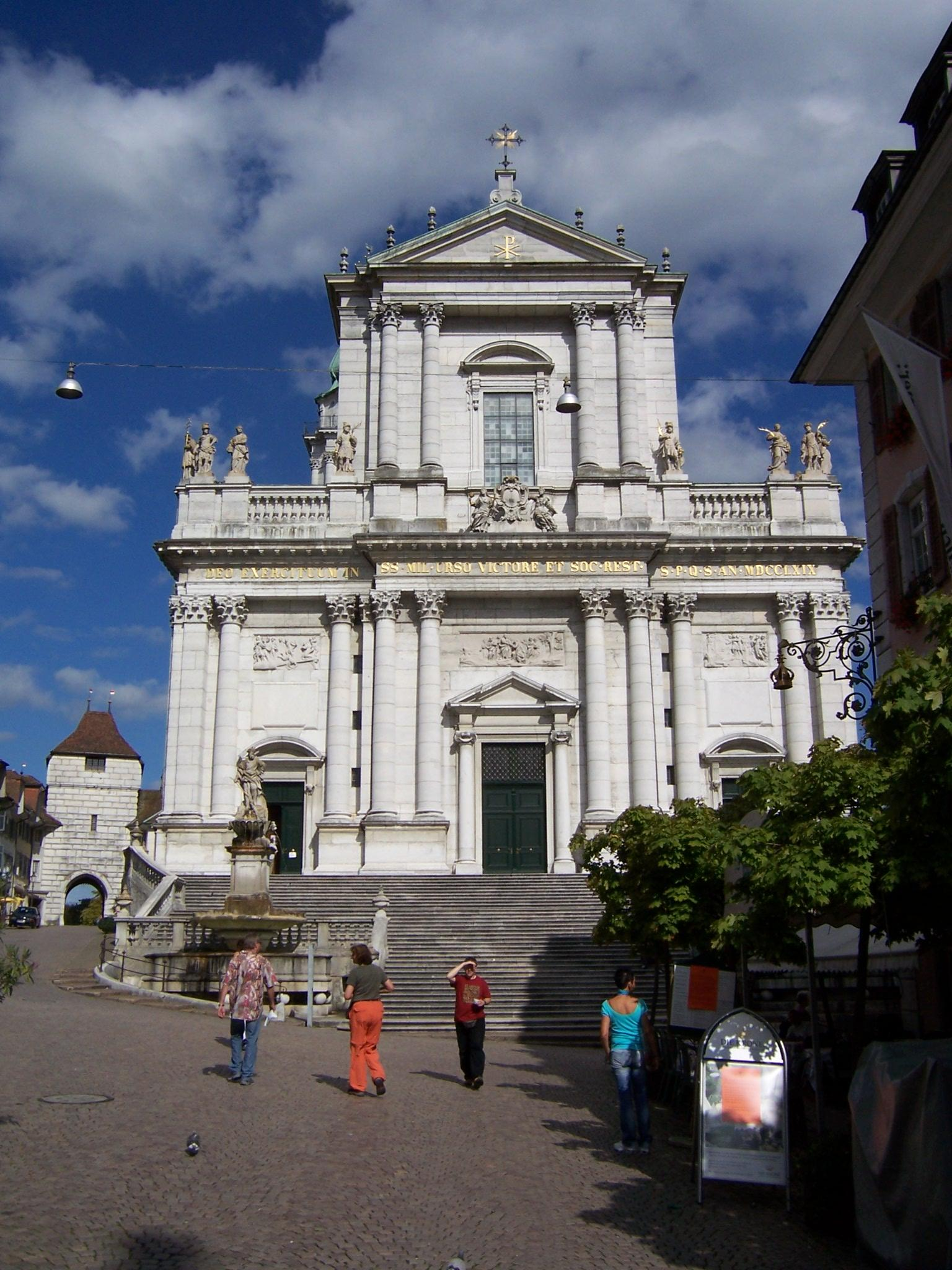
- Solothurn Cathedral, the seat of the diocese

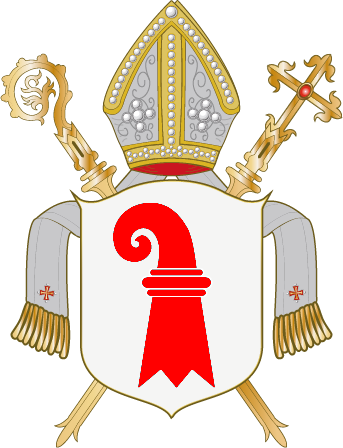
- Coat of arms

Location
- Country: Switzerland
- Territory: Aargau, Basel-Landschaft, Basel-Stadt, Bern, Jura, Lucerne, Schaffhausen, Solothurn, Thurgau, and Zug
- Metropolitan: Immediately subject to the Holy See

Statistics
- Area: 12,585 km^{2} (4,859 sq mi)
- Population: Total; Catholics: (as of 2022); 3,462,119; 1,010,839 (29.2%)
- Parishes: 483

Information
- Denomination: Catholic
- Sui iuris church: Latin Church
- Rite: Roman Rite
- Established: 740 (As Diocese of Basel); 7 September 1888 (As Diocese of Basel e Lugano); 8 March 1971 (As Diocese of Basel)
- Cathedral: St. Ursus Cathedral, Solothurn
- Secular priests: 675

Current leadership
- Pope: Leo XIV
- Bishop: Felix Gmür
- Bishops emeritus: Hansjörg Vogel; Denis Theurillat; Martin Gächter

Map
- Map of the modern diocese of Basel within Switzerland

Website
- bistum-basel.ch

The Diocese of Basel (German: Bistum Basel; Latin: Diœcesis Basileensis) is a Latin Catholic diocese in Switzerland.

Historically, the bishops of Basel were also secular rulers of the Prince-Bishopric of Basel (German: Fürstbistum Basel). Today the diocese of Basel includes the Swiss cantons of Aargau, Basel-Landschaft, Basel-Stadt, Bern, Jura, Lucerne, Schaffhausen, Solothurn, Thurgau, and Zug.

Basel Minster, the Cathedral of the diocese prior to the reformation

== Ordinaries ==
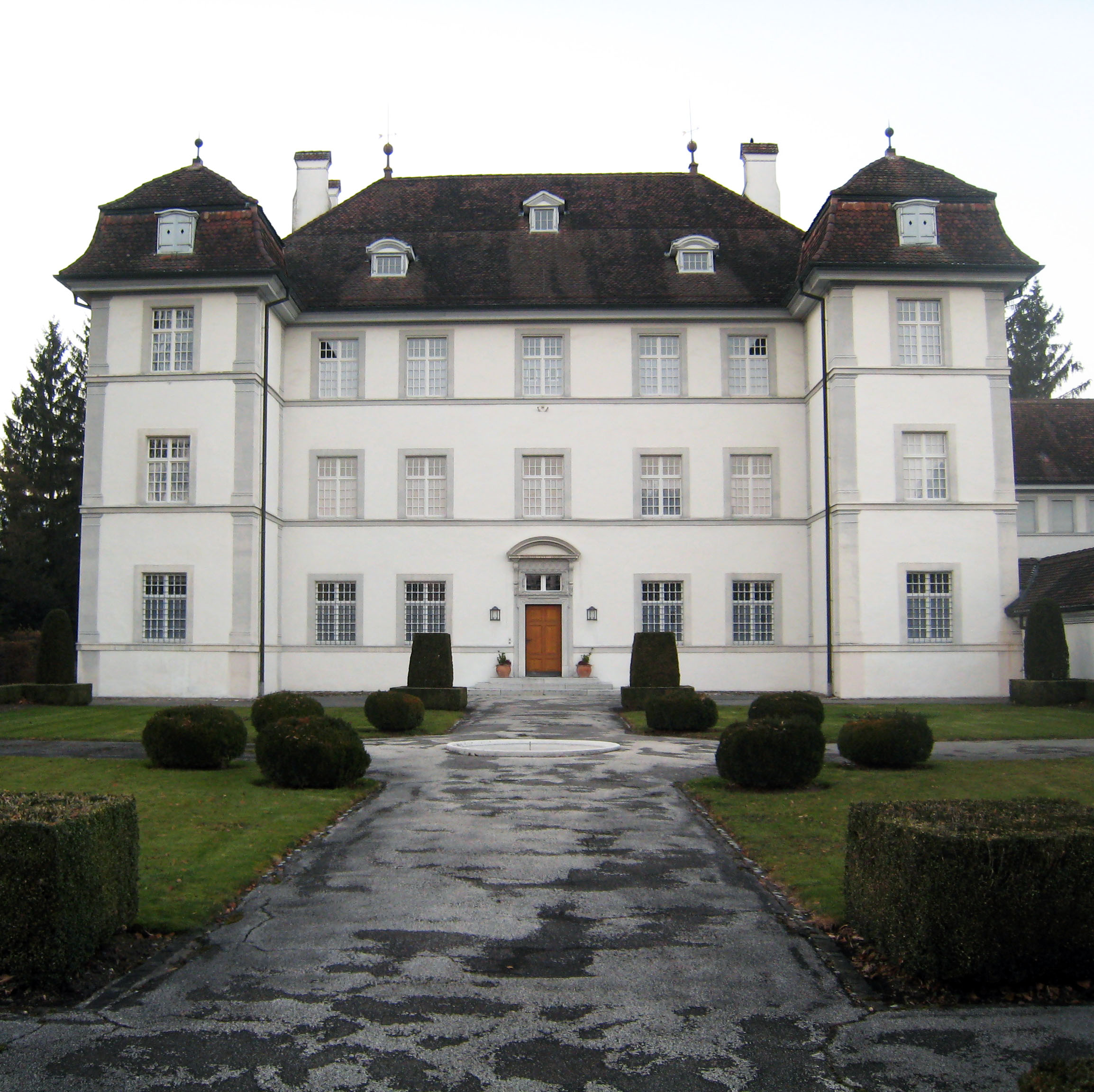
Haller House in Solothurn, residence of the Bishop of Basel

The bishops of Basel have not resided in the city of Basel since 1528. Solothurn is the seat of the Bishop.

- Jakob Christoph Blarer von Wartensee (1576–1608)
- Wilhelm Rinck von Balderstein (1609–1628)
- Johann Heinrich von Ostein (1629–1646)
- Beat Albrecht von Ramstein (1646–1651)
- Johann Franz Reichsritter von Schönau (1651–1656)
- Johann Konrad von Roggenbach (1657–1693)
- Wilhelm Jakob Rink von Baldenstein (1693–1705)
- Johann Konrad Reichsfreiherr von Reinach-Hirzbach (1705–1737)
- Jakob Sigismund von Reinach-Steinbrunn (1737–1743)
- Josef Wilhelm Rinck von Baldenstein (1744–1762)
- Simon Nikolaus Euseb Reichsgraf von Montjoye-Hirsingen (1762–1775)
- Friedrich Ludwig Franz Reichsfreiherr von Wangen zu Geroldseck (1775–1782)
- Franz Joseph Sigismund von Roggenbach (1782–1792)
- Franz Xaver Freiherr von Neveu (1792–1828)
- Josef Anton Salzmann (1828–1854)
- Karl Arnold-Obrist (1854–1862)
- Eugène Lachat C.Pp.S. (1863–1884)
- Friedrich Xaver Odo Fiala (1885–1888)
- Leonhard Haas (1888–1906)
- Jakobus von Stammler (1906–1925)
- Joseph Ambühl (1925–1936)
- Franz von Streng (1936–1967)
- Anton Hänggi (1967–1982)
- Otto Wüst (1982–1993)
- Hansjörg Vogel (1994–1995)
- Kurt Koch (1995–2010)
- Felix Gmür (2010– )
