= Hansjörg Vogel =

Swiss theologian (born 1951)

- Church: Roman Catholic
- Diocese: Diocese of Basel
- Appointed: 3 February 1994
- Installed: 4 April 1994
- Term ended: 2 June 1995
- Predecessor: Otto Wüst
- Successor: Kurt Koch

Orders
- Ordination: 28 November 1976
- Consecration: 4 April 1994 by Otto Wüst

Personal details
- Born: 16 March 1951 (age 75) Bern, Switzerland
- Coat of arms

Hansjörg Vogel (born 16 March 1951 in Bern) is a Swiss theologian and laicized bishop, who was from 1994 until his resignation in 1995 the Roman Catholic bishop of Basel.

== Life ==
On 28 November 1976, he received his priestly ordination. After his election as bishop of Basel and the confirmation by Pope John Paul II, he was nominated as bishop on 4 April 1994. The episcopal consecration was given by his predecessor in office, Otto Wüst. On 2 June 1995, he resigned from his office after it became known that he would soon be a father.

He then married the woman who was the mother of his child. He worked from 1996 to 1998 as a project manager at Refugee Services of the Swiss Labor Assistance and was a scientific assistant at the Red Cross Swiss Therapy. Meanwhile, he trained as an analytical psychologist at Carl Gustav Jung Institute in Kuesnacht. Since January 2001, he is an Immigration and Integration Officer working at the Canton of Lucerne.

== Works ==
In German:

- Busse als ganzheitliche Erneuerung. Praktischtheologische Perspektiven einer zeitgemässen Umkehrpraxis dargestellt am Fastenopfer der Schweizer Katholiken. Universitäts-Verlag, Freiburg im Üechtland 1990, ISBN 3-7278-0666-4 (Praktische Theologie im Dialog. Vol 4).

== Literature ==
In German:

- Stephan Leimgruber:Hansjörg Vogel (1993-1994) – Bischof in radikal pluralistischer Gesellschaft.In: Urban Fink, Stephan Leimgruber (eds.):Die Bischöfe von Basel 1794–1995.Universitäts-Verlag, Freiburg im Üechtland 1996, ISBN 3-7278-1069-6, p. 377-400.
