= Congress of Rastatt =

Congress of Rastatt refers to:

- First Congress of Rastatt in 1713 between Austria and France
- Second Congress of Rastatt in 1797 during the French Revolutionary Wars
