= Joseph Wilhelm Rinck von Baldenstein (prince-bishop) =

Georg Josef Wilhelm Aloys Rinck von Baldenstein
- Bishop of Basel
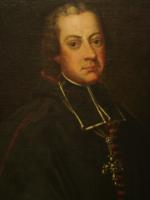
- Church: Catholic Church
- Diocese: Diocese of Basel
- In office: 13 April 1744 – 13 September 1762
- Predecessor: Jakob Sigismund von Reinach-Steinbrunn
- Successor: Simon Nikolaus Euseb von Montjoye-Hirsingen

Orders
- Ordination: 31 March 1736
- Consecration: 22 November 1744 by Antoine-Pierre de Grammont

Personal details
- Born: 9 February 1704 Saignelégier, Prince-Bishopric of Basel, Upper Rhenish Circle, Holy Roman Empire
- Died: 13 September 1762 (aged 58)

Joseph Wilhelm Rinck von Baldenstein, in French Joseph Guillaume Rinck de Baldenstein (9 February 1704 – 13 September 1762), was the prince-bishop of Basel from 1744 until his death in 1762.

== Biography ==
Rinck von Baldenstein was born on 9 February 1704 in Saignelégier, the son of Joseph Wilhelm Rinck von Baldenstein, and the brother of Ignaz Balthasar Willibald and Luzius Xaver Christoph Rinck von Baldenstein. He attended the Jesuit college of Porrentruy and studied law at Freiburg im Breisgau from 1724 to 1727. In 1728 he became a member of the aulic council of the prince-bishop of Basel, was elected to the cathedral chapter of Basel in 1732, became a capitular in 1735, and was ordained a priest at Porrentruy in 1736.

On 22 January 1744 the cathedral chapter of Basel Münster elected him to be the new Prince-Bishop of Basel, with Pope Benedict XIV confirming his appointment on 13 April 1744. He was consecrated as a bishop on 22 November 1744. In 1747 Emperor Francis I granted him the imperial investiture. At the beginning of his reign he followed a strict policy of neutrality, but later opened himself to the influence of the French ambassadors at Solothurn, and in 1758 concluded a military capitulation with France on the Confederate model.

In the administration and economy of the prince-bishopric, Rinck von Baldenstein continued the reforms of his predecessors. His economic policy was mercantilist in character, and he particularly promoted road building, the iron industry, and forestry. After the death of the auxiliary bishop Johann Baptist Haus in 1745, he personally took on the duties of spiritual pastor. Rooted in scholastic theology, he worked to improve the training of priests and had the teaching offered by the Jesuits at Porrentruy expanded, with the creation of a faculty of theology in 1760. The years of his episcopate brought the prince-bishopric and the diocese of Basel a modernization, in both spiritual and secular affairs, shaped by the ideals of the French administration éclairée.

He died on 13 September 1762.

Catholic Church titles
Preceded by Jakob Sigismund von Reinach-Steinbrunn	Prince-Bishop of Basel; 1744–1762	Succeeded by Simon Nikolaus Euseb von Montjoye-Hirsingen
