= Felix Gmür =

Swiss Roman Catholic bishop

His Excellency Felix Gmür
- Bishop of Basel
- Church: Roman Catholic
- Diocese: Diocese of Basel
- Appointed: 23 November 2010
- Installed: 16 January 2011
- Predecessor: Kurt Koch

Orders
- Ordination: 30 May 1999 by Kurt Koch
- Consecration: 16 January 2011 by Kurt Koch

Personal details
- Born: June 7, 1966 (age 59) Lucerne, Switzerland
- Motto: Intellegentes quae sit voluntas Domini
- Coat of arms

Styles of Felix Gmür
- Reference style: The Most Reverend
- Spoken style: Your Excellency
- Religious style: Bishop
- Posthumous style: not applicable

Felix Gmür (born 7 June 1966) is a Swiss Roman Catholic bishop. He is the bishop of Basel since his installation on 16 January 2011. He had previously served as secretary of the Swiss Bishops' Conference.

Gmür was born in Lucerne in 1966. From 1986 to 1990 he studied philosophy at the School of Philosophy (of the Jesuits) in Munich and at the Sèvres Centre in Paris and received a licentiate in philosophy. From 1990 to 1994 he studied theology at the Universities of Fribourg and Munich, ending with a degree in theology.

After 1994 he continued his studies of philosophy and exegesis in Munich, also attending courses in art history. In 1997 he obtained his doctorate in philosophy on the aesthetics of Ludwig Wittgenstein. While studying in Munich, he was a student at the supraregional seminary of that city, the Herzogliches Georgianum.

From 1997 to 1999 did the pastoral internship in the diocese of Basel, working first as a pastoral assistant and later as a deacon in the parish of S. Antonio in Basel. He was ordained a priest on 30 May 1999 in Lucerne for the diocese of Basel. From 1999 to 2001 and was then vicar of the parish of St. Antonio in Basel. From 2001 to 2004 he studied at the Pontifical Gregorian University as a student at the Pontifical Teutonic Institute of Santa Maria dell'Anima. From 2004 to 2006 he was Vice-Rector of the Major Seminary in Basel to Lucerne, while working in parishes and Menzingen Neuheim. From 2006 until 2010 he served as secretary of the Swiss Bishops' Conference.

Gmür was elected by an 18-head advisory council of the cantonal bishopric on 8 September and his nomination was submitted for approval to the pope. Gmür was appointed by Pope Benedict XVI on 23 November 2010. Gmür was consecrated and installed on 16 January 2011, in Olten.

In September 2019, Gmür allowed blessings of same-sex unions in the diocese of Basel.

Ahead of the opening of the 2023 synod, Gmür expressed support for the end of mandatory priestly celibacy and for the ordination of women.
