= Prince-Bishopric of Basel =

Ecclesiastical principality in Holy Roman Empire

Prince-Bishopric of Basel Fürstbistum Basel
- 1032–1803
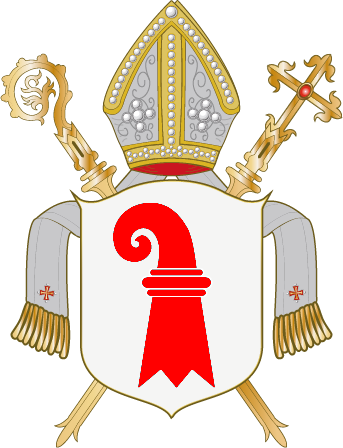
- Flag Coat of arms

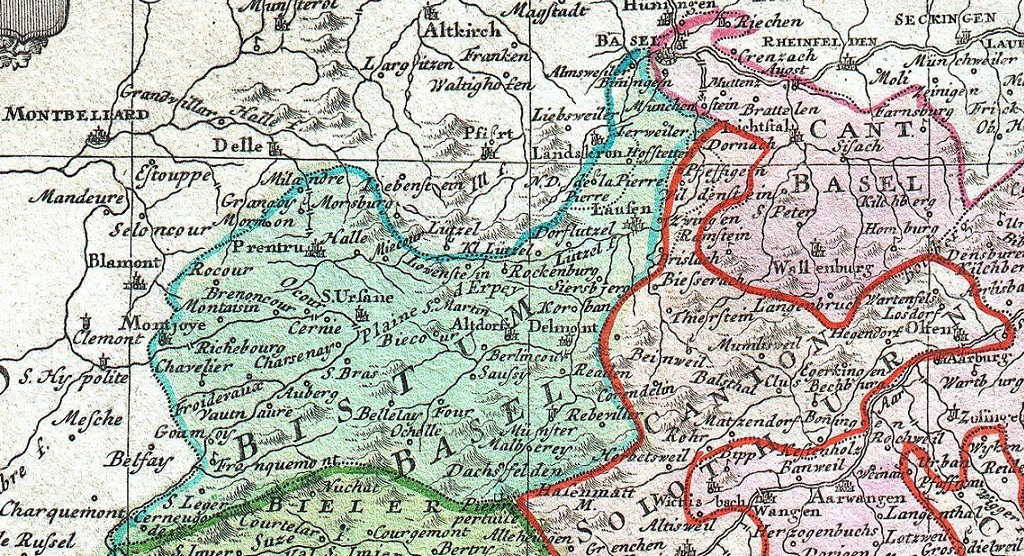
- The Prince-Bishopric in the 18th century
- Status: Prince-Bishopric
- Capital: Basel (to 1528); Porrentruy (to 1792); Schliengen
- Common languages: Franc-Comtais, High Alemannic, Latin
- Religion: Catholic; Swiss Reformed Church (from early 16th century); Judaism (from late 12th century)
- Government: Elective principality
- Prince-Bishop
  - 1032–1040: Ulrich II
  - 1794–1803: Franz Xaver von Neveu
- History
  - Diocese established: 740
  - Elevated to Prince-Bishopric: 1032
  - Joined Upper Rhenish Circle: 1495
  - Swiss Reformation: 1528
  - Treaty of Campo Formio: 1797
  - Mediatised to Baden: 1803
- Currency: Rappen; Basel thaler (1576–1798)
Preceded by	Succeeded by
Kingdom of Burgundy	Mont-Terrible; Margraviate of Baden

The Prince-Bishopric of Basel (German: Hochstift Basel, Fürstbistum Basel, Bistum Basel) was an ecclesiastical principality within the Holy Roman Empire, ruled from 1032 by prince-bishops with their seat at Basel, and from 1528 until 1792 at Porrentruy, and thereafter at Schliengen. As an imperial estate, the prince-bishop had a seat and voting rights at the Imperial Diet. The final dissolution of the state occurred in 1803 as part of the German Mediatisation.

The Prince-Bishopric comprised territories now in the Swiss cantons of Basel-Landschaft, Jura, Solothurn and Bern, besides minor territories in nearby portions of southern Germany and eastern France. The city of Basel ceased to be part of the Prince-Bishopric after it joined the Swiss Confederacy in 1501.

== History ==
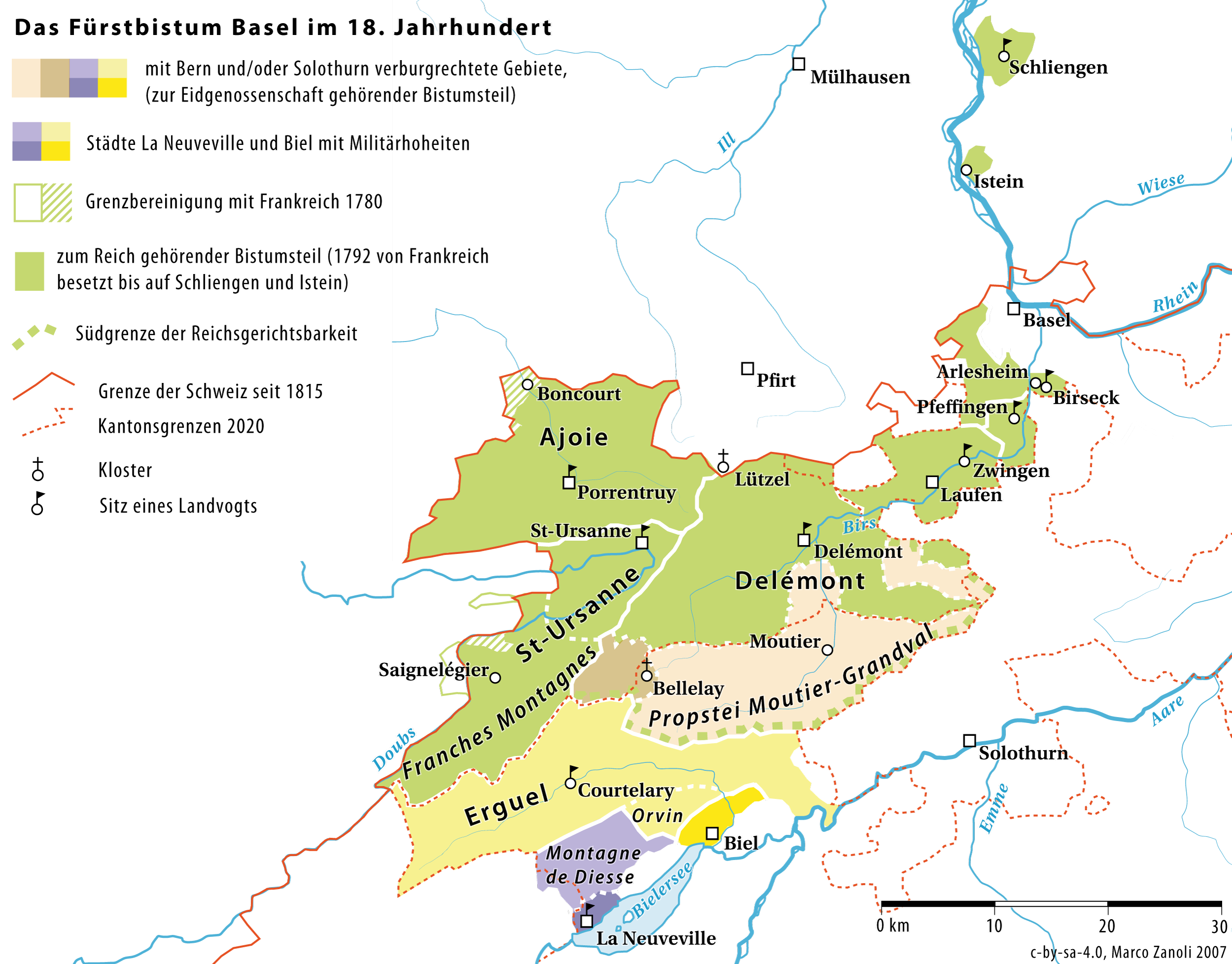
Map of the Prince-Bishopric of Basel in the 18th century

The Bishopric of Basel was established by the Carolingians, either by Pepin the Short or by Charlemagne himself. The first recorded bishop of Basel is one Walaus, the first entry in the list of bishops preserved in Munster Abbey. He is listed as archiepiscopus during the reign of Pope Gregory III (731–741). The historicity of this is questionable, as Basel during this time was part of the Archdiocese of Besançon. It has been proposed that Walaus is identical with one Walachus vocatus episcopus who is attested in 778. Another candidate as first bishop of Basel is one Baldobertus, Abbot of Murbach, who signed as Baldeberthus episcopus civitas Baselae in 762. It is also possible that the seat of the diocese of Augusta Raurica had intermittently been moved to Basel already in the 7th century, with one Ragnacharius mentioned as Augustanus et Basileae ecclesiarum praesul in the vita of Eustace of Luxeuil (d. 629). The title of bishop of Basel is attested with certainty still in the 8th century, with Waldo, Abbot of Reichenau, who was awarded the titles of bishop of Pavia and of Basel by Charlemagne in 791, titles he held without taking residence in either of these cities. The title was transferred to Waldo's successor as Abbot of Reichenau, Haito. Haito was succeeded by Udalricus (r. 823–835), who entered the city in May 824 and thus may have been the first bishop with actual residence in Basel.

Rudolph III of Burgundy in 999 presented the bishop of Basel with the Abbey of Moutier-Grandval, establishing the bishopric as a secular vassal state of Burgundy with feudal authority over significant territories. After the death of Rudolph in 1032, the vassalage was converted to imperial immediacy, elevating the Bishop of Basel to the status of Prince-Bishop, ranking as an ecclesiastical prince of the Holy Roman Empire.

The Prince-Bishopric reached the peak of its power during the late 12th to early 14th centuries. A legendary founder of the bishopric, one Pantalus, placed in either the 4th or 5th century, was venerated in the 12th century. His supposed relics were transferred from Cologne to Basel in 1270 (moved to Mariastein in 1833).

In the course of the 14th century, financial difficulties forced the bishops of Basel to sell parts of their territory. During the 15th century, however, a number of politically and militarily successful bishops managed to regain some of the previously lost territories and Basel began to align itself with the Old Swiss Confederacy as an "associated city" (Zugewandter Ort).

Basel became the focal point of western Christendom during the 15th century Council of Basel (1431–1449), including the 1439 election of antipope Felix V. In 1459 Pope Pius II endowed the University of Basel where such notables as Erasmus of Rotterdam and Paracelsus later taught. Following the Imperial Reform of 1495, the prince-bishopric was part of the Upper Rhenish Circle of the Imperial Circle Estates.

The city of Basel itself by gradual concessions gained its de facto independence from the prince-bishops by the late 14th century. However, the city continued to renew a nominal oath of fealty to the bishops, even after it had joined the Swiss Confederacy in 1501, until the beginning Swiss Reformation in 1521. Prince-bishop Christoph von Utenheim held on as bishop of Basel for a few years, but the slow decline of his authority forced him to resign, on 19 February 1527. His successor, Philippe von Gundelsheim was the last bishop to be formally welcomed to the city, on 23 September 1527. In 1528, the Reformation led by Johannes Oecolampadius was formally adopted by the city. The celebration of Mass was abolished, and von Gundelsheim established his residence in Porrentruy, which was part of his secular territories even though ecclesiastically, it was part of the Archdiocese of Besançon. The secular rule of the Prince-Bishops from this time was mostly limited to territories west of Basel, more or less corresponding to the modern canton of Jura.

The Prince-Bishopric lost the bulk of its remaining territories to the Rauracian Republic in 1792 (revolutionarily converted into the French département of Mont-Terrible in the following year), while the treaty of Campo Formio in 1797 gave international recognizance to the French annexation, which could be expanded to all the bishopric territory (while Switzerland received Austrian Fricktal as indemnity), which retained Schliengen as its sole dominion. Schliengen was made part of the Margraviate of Baden in the resolution of the Reichsdeputationshauptschluss of 1803, discontinuing the status of the bishops of Basel as secular rulers.

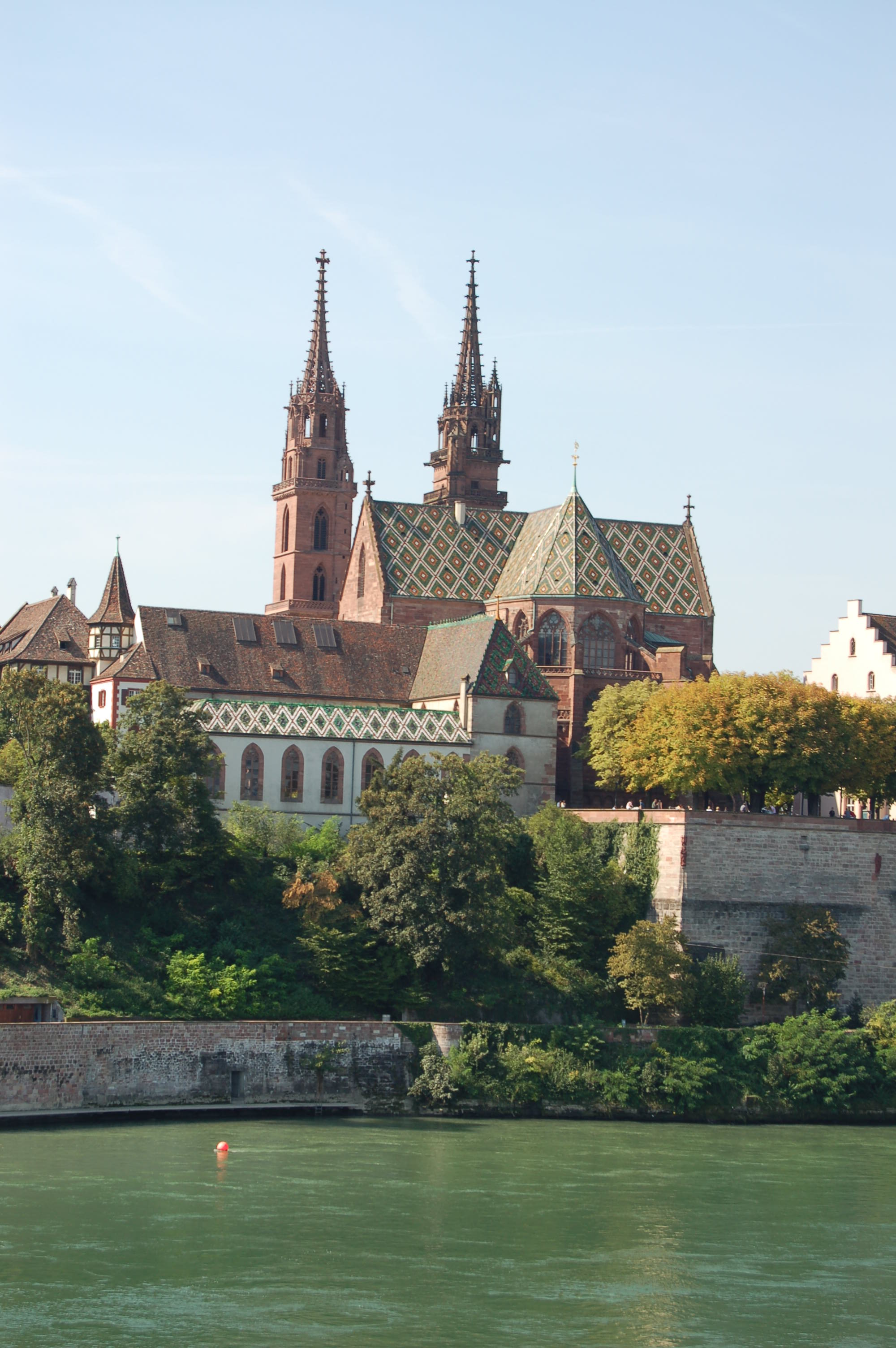
Basel Minster and Palace, until the Swiss Reformation in 1529 cathedral and residence of the prince-bishops

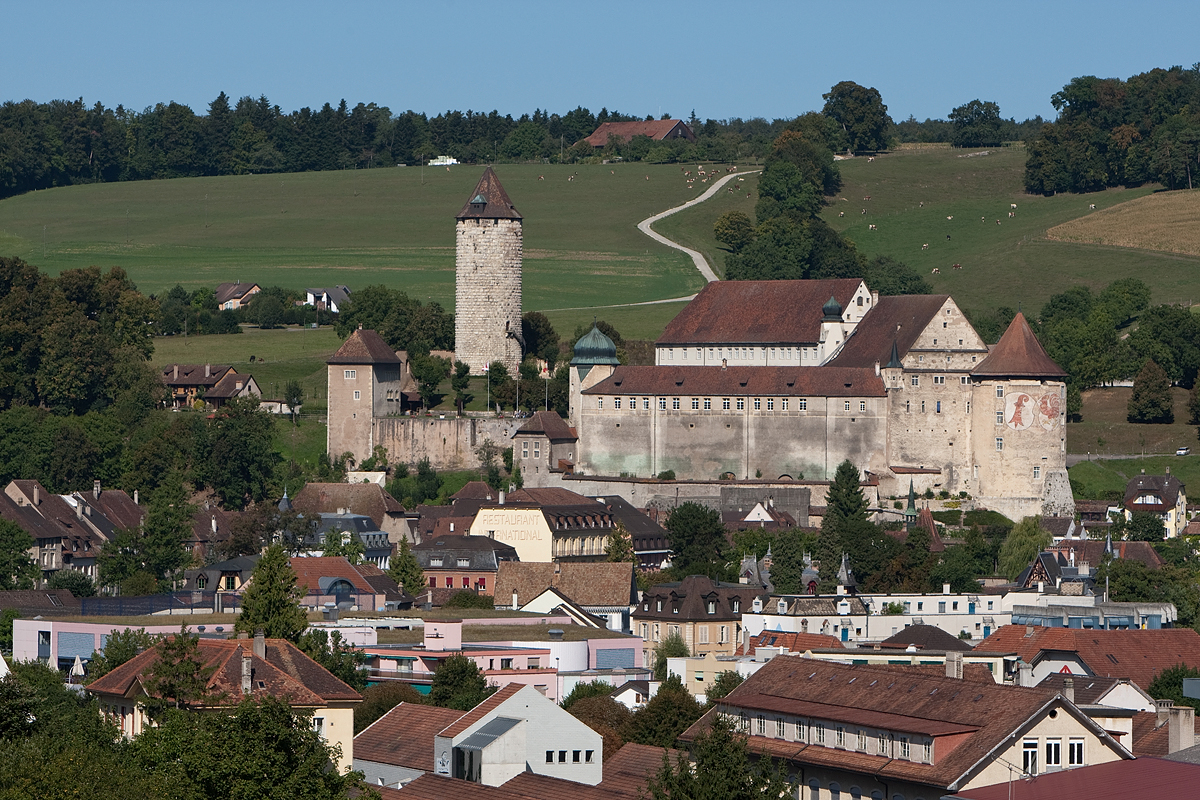
Porrentruy Castle, 1527–1792 exile residence of the prince-bishops

== Territories ==
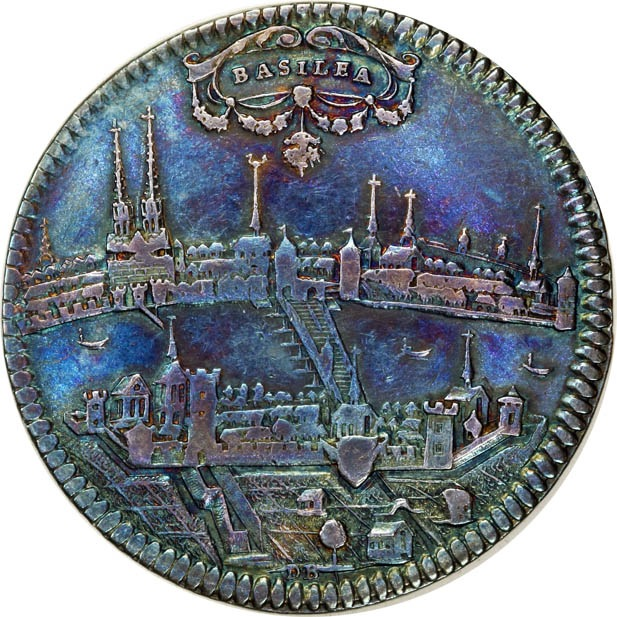
A Basel thaler, c. 1690

By the 16th century, the Prince-Bishopric of Basel comprised:

- Basel
- Abbey of Bellelay
- Bettingen
- Amt of Birseck
- Barony of Elsgau
- Barony of Erguel
- Amt of Homberg
- Istein
- Amt of Liestal
- Provostry of Moutier-Grandval
- Barony of Orvin
- Barony of Pfäffingen
- Riehen
- Vogtei of St Ursanne
- Vogtei of Saugern
- Schliengen
- Barony of Tessenberg
- Amt of Waldenburg
- Amt of Zwingen-Laufen

The Prince-Bishopric also held the following territories, which were lost before 1527:

- Landgraviate of Buchsgau
- Landgraviate of Sisgau
- Barony of Valangin

== See also ==
- List of bishops of Basel
- History of Basel
