= Ignace de Billieux d'Ehrenfeld =

Swiss Roman Catholic canon (1769–1832)

- Born: Pierre Joseph Ignace de Billieux d'Ehrenfeld; 16 March 1769; Porrentruy, Prince-Bishopric of Basel
- Died: 4 March 1832 (aged 62); Porrentruy, canton of Bern, Switzerland
- Occupation: Catholic canon

Ignace de Billieux d'Ehrenfeld, in German Ignaz von Billieux von Ehrenfeld (16 March 1769 – 4 March 1832), was a Swiss Roman Catholic canon and educator.

== Biography ==
Billieux d'Ehrenfeld was born on 16 March 1769 in Porrentruy, the son of Dominique Joseph, and was a citizen of Porrentruy. He was the brother of Aloyse, André François Xavier, Joseph Bernard, and Ursanne Conrad Joseph.

He studied at Porrentruy, Besançon, Dole, and the seminary of Saint-Sulpice in Paris, and held doctorates in theology and philosophy from Rome. He became a canon of Moutier-Grandval. During the Revolution he took refuge at Solothurn, Zurzach, and Freiburg im Breisgau, and was appointed an honorary canon of Strasbourg by Bishop Jean-Pierre Saurine.

From 1802 Billieux d'Ehrenfeld served the parish of Alle, buying back the presbytery that had been sold as nationalized property. Under the government of Baron Conrad Charles Frédéric d'Andlau-Birseck and during the Restoration, he was director of studies at the colleges of Porrentruy and Delémont.

== Bibliography ==
- Sammlung bernischer Biographien, vol. 1, 1884, 501–510
