= François Verdan =

Swiss calico manufacturer and politician (1747–1818)

- Born: 5 September 1747; Cortaillod, Switzerland
- Died: 28 November 1818 (aged 71); Delémont, Switzerland
- Occupations: Calico manufacturer; politician
- Spouse: Marguerite Tenderon

François Verdan (5 September 1747 – 28 November 1818) was a Swiss calico manufacturer and politician. A Francophile supporter of the revolutionary cause, he was one of the largest purchasers of nationalized property in the Prince-Bishopric of Basel and later served as mayor of Delémont.

== Biography ==
Verdan was born on 5 September 1747 in Cortaillod, the son of Jean-Daniel Verdan, a calico printer and later merchant, and Marguerite De Vaux. In 1767 he married Marguerite Tenderon, daughter of Jacques Tenderon.

After an apprenticeship as a printer in the calico-printing manufactories of Cortaillod and its surroundings, Verdan took over that of Greng with his brothers in 1775, and from 1779 that of Ruz-de-Combe at Saint-Blaise. In 1784 he acquired the calico manufactory of Pasquart at Biel, which he developed together with his son and his sons-in-law, among them Johann Rudolf Neuhaus.

Verdan became part of the progressive, Francophile section of the Biel bourgeoisie. A supporter of the ideas of the French Revolution and a friend of François Augustin Roussel, the Directory's commissioner in the department of Mont-Terrible, he became one of the largest purchasers of nationalized property in the Prince-Bishopric of Basel. His acquisitions included the episcopal castle of Delémont and the farmsteads of Löwenburg, formerly owned by Lucelle Abbey, and of Ritzengrund at Roggenburg. In 1798, when Biel became French, he was elected to the department's electoral assembly, which appointed him a senior juror at the high court of justice.

Around 1800 Verdan settled permanently in Delémont, where he developed the proto-industry of weaving and spinning (textile industry) and served as a municipal councillor (1801) and then mayor (1805). Judged too pro-French, he was removed from office in 1814 by Conrad Charles Frédéric d'Andlau-Birseck, and afterward served as a judge at the civil court from 1814.

== Bibliography ==
- L. Bergeron, G. Chaussinand-Nogaret, eds., Grands notables du Premier Empire. Notices de biographie sociale, vol. 11, 1984, 60–61
- R. Dahler, "Die Bieler Indienneindustrie von den Anfängen bis zum Ende der französischen Zeit", in Annales biennoises, 1988, 68–133
- W. Bourquin, M. Bourquin, Biel, stadtgeschichtliches Lexikon, 1999, 459
- I. Ehrensperger, "François Verdan und die Indiennemanufakturen von Greng und Biel im 18. und frühen 19. Jahrhundert", in Freiburger Geschichtsblätter, 78, 2001, 125–140

=== Archives ===
- Nouveau Musée Bienne, Biel, Familienarchiv Neuhaus-Verdan (1747–1975)
