= Ursanne Conrad Joseph de Billieux d'Ehrenfeld =

Jurassian politician (1760–1824)

- Born: 22 November 1760; Porrentruy, Prince-Bishopric of Basel
- Died: 24 May 1824 (aged 63); Porrentruy, canton of Bern, Switzerland
- Occupations: Army officer; politician
- Spouse: Maria Eleonore d'Andlau

Ursanne Conrad Joseph de Billieux d'Ehrenfeld, in German Ursann Konrad Joseph von Billieux von Ehrenfeld (22 November 1760 – 24 May 1824), was a Jurassian army officer and politician who took part in negotiating the future of the former Prince-Bishopric of Basel at the Congress of Vienna and was the first Jurassian to sit on the Bernese small council.

== Biography ==
Billieux d'Ehrenfeld was born on 22 November 1760 in Porrentruy, the son of Dominique Joseph, and was a citizen of Saint-Ursanne. He was the brother of Joseph Bernard, Ignace, André François Xavier and Aloyse.

In 1801 he married Maria Eleonore d'Andlau, daughter of François Charles d'Andlau. In 1778 he entered the service of France and became an officer of the Swiss Guard; discharged at Dieppe in Normandy in 1792, he moved in with his brother, the canon Joseph Bernard, at Zurzach, and served as inspector general of the county of Baden.

Billieux d'Ehrenfeld fled to Freiburg im Breisgau in 1798, returned to Porrentruy in 1801, and became a member of the district council in 1808. After the entry of the Allied troops into the Jura in 1814, his brother-in-law Conrad Charles Frédéric d'Andlau-Birseck called him to the post of commissioner for the former bishopric of Basel. Billieux d'Ehrenfeld negotiated the country's future at Vesoul in 1814 with Emperor Francis I of Austria and at the Congress of Vienna in 1814–1815. Together with d'Andlau-Birseck he sought, without success, to restore the prince-bishop's rule and to form a separate canton.

In 1815 Billieux d'Ehrenfeld was one of the seven Jurassian notables who signed the acts of union with Bern. He became the first Jurassian member of the Bernese small council in 1816, and was bailiff of Porrentruy from 1822 to 1824.

== Bibliography ==
- M. Jorio, Der Untergang des Fürstbistums Basel (1792–1815), 1982, 241–243

=== Archives ===
- Archives cantonales jurassiennes (ARCJ)
