= André François Xavier de Billieux d'Ehrenfeld =

Swiss jurist and official of the Prince-Bishopric of Basel (1747–1811)

- Born: 2 November 1747; Porrentruy, Prince-Bishopric of Basel
- Died: 12 July 1811 (aged 63); Freiburg im Breisgau, Grand Duchy of Baden
- Occupations: Jurist; court official

André François Xavier de Billieux d'Ehrenfeld, in German Andreas Franz Xavier von Billieux von Ehrenfeld (2 November 1747 – 12 July 1811), was a Swiss jurist and official who served as a privy councillor of the Prince-Bishopric of Basel.

== Biography ==
Billieux d'Ehrenfeld was born on 2 November 1747 in Porrentruy, the son of Dominique Joseph, and was a citizen of Porrentruy. He was the brother of Aloyse, Ignace, Joseph Bernard, and Ursanne Conrad Joseph. No marriage of his is known. He held a doctorate in Roman and canon law.

Billieux d'Ehrenfeld was an advocate at the court of the prince-bishop of Basel from 1770, secretary of the aulic council from 1771, aulic councillor from 1774, secretary of the privy council from 1782, and later a privy councillor. He served the last two prince-bishops of Basel during their exile, returned to Porrentruy in 1800, and later settled at Freiburg im Breisgau.

== Bibliography ==
- M. Jorio, Der Untergang des Fürstbistums Basel (1792–1815), 1982, 240–241
- C. Fournier, "André Xavier Billieux", in Actes de la Société jurassienne d'émulation, 1987, 59–87
