= 2002–03 Nationalliga A season =

Swiss professional ice hockey season

The 2002–03 NLA season was the 65th regular season of the Nationalliga A, the main professional ice hockey league in Switzerland.

== Regular season ==
=== Final standings ===
| | Team | GP | W | L | T | GF | GA | Pts |
|---|---|---|---|---|---|---|---|---|
| 1. | ZSC Lions | 44 | 25 | 11 | 8 | 154 | 104 | 58 |
| 2. | HC Davos | 44 | 26 | 13 | 5 | 153 | 99 | 57 |
| 3. | SC Bern | 44 | 22 | 14 | 8 | 139 | 108 | 52 |
| 4. | HC Lugano | 44 | 24 | 16 | 4 | 159 | 129 | 52 |
| 5. | Kloten Flyers | 44 | 24 | 17 | 3 | 145 | 125 | 51 |
| 6. | Genève-Servette HC | 44 | 19 | 15 | 10 | 110 | 107 | 48 |
| 7. | HC Ambri-Piotta | 44 | 15 | 19 | 10 | 102 | 124 | 40 |
| 8. | SC Rapperswil-Jona | 44 | 15 | 22 | 7 | 122 | 139 | 37 |
| 9. | HC Fribourg-Gottéron | 44 | 16 | 23 | 5 | 118 | 165 | 37 |
| 10. | EV Zug | 44 | 14 | 25 | 5 | 110 | 142 | 33 |
| 11. | SCL Tigers | 44 | 12 | 24 | 8 | 115 | 147 | 32 |
| 12. | HC Lausanne | 44 | 13 | 26 | 5 | 102 | 140 | 31 |

=== Scoring leaders ===
Note: GP = Games played; G = Goals; A = Assists; Pts = Points; PIM = Penalty Minutes

| Player | Team | GP | G | A | Pts | PIM |
|---|---|---|---|---|---|---|
| Petteri Nummelin | HC Lugano | 43 | 18 | 39 | 57 | 12 |
| Christian Dubé | SC Bern | 44 | 15 | 38 | 53 | 26 |
| Todd Elik | SC Langnau | 39 | 13 | 36 | 49 | 127 |
| Sébastien Bordeleau | SC Bern | 41 | 22 | 26 | 48 | 127 |
| Jaroslav Hlinka | Kloten Flyers | 41 | 18 | 30 | 48 | 16 |
| Kimmo Rintanen | Kloten Flyers | 38 | 17 | 31 | 48 | 8 |
| Christian Matte | ZSC Lions | 44 | 22 | 25 | 47 | 49 |
| Derek Plante | ZSC Lions | 44 | 22 | 24 | 46 | 34 |
| Chris Tancill | EV Zug | 43 | 22 | 22 | 44 | 63 |
| Adrian Wichser | HC Lugano | 44 | 26 | 17 | 43 | 4 |

== Playoffs ==
=== Quarterfinals ===
ZSC Lions (1) vs. SC Rapperswil-Jona (8)
| Away | Home |
|---|---|
| SC Rapperswil-Jona 1 | 4 ZSC Lions |
| ZSC Lions 2 | 0 SC Rapperswil-Jona |
| SC Rapperswil-Jona 3 | 1 ZSC Lions |
| ZSC Lions 2 | 4 SC Rapperswil-Jona |
| SC Rapperswil-Jona 3 | 1 ZSC Lions |
| ZSC Lions 3 | 2 SC Rapperswil-Jona |
| SC Rapperswil-Jona 0 | 2 ZSC Lions |
ZSC Lions wins series 4–3

SC Bern (3) vs. Genève-Servette HC (6)
| Away | Home | |
|---|---|---|
| Genève-Servette HC 0 | 7 SC Bern | |
| SC Bern 5 | 2 Genève-Servette HC | |
| Genève-Servette HC 2 | 1 SC Bern | OT |
| SC Bern 2 | 3 Genève-Servette HC | |
| Genève-Servette HC 0 | 1 SC Bern | |
| SC Bern 5 | 1 Genève-Servette HC | |
SC Bern wins series 4–2

HC Davos (2) vs. HC Ambri-Piotta (7)
| Away | Home |
|---|---|
| HC Ambri-Piotta 1 | 4 HC Davos |
| HC Davos 5 | 1 HC Ambri-Piotta |
| HC Ambri-Piotta 0 | 3 HC Davos |
| HC Davos 3 | 2 HC Ambri-Piotta |
HC Davos wins series 4–0

HC Lugano (4) vs. Kloten Flyers (5)
| Away | Home | |
|---|---|---|
| Kloten Flyers 1 | 4 HC Lugano | |
| HC Lugano 3 | 4 Kloten Flyers | OT |
| Kloten Flyers 3 | 4 HC Lugano | |
| HC Lugano 3 | 2 Kloten Flyers | |
| Kloten Flyers 1 | 6 HC Lugano | |
HC Lugano wins series 4–1

=== Semifinals ===
ZSC Lions vs. HC Lugano
| Away | Home |
|---|---|
| HC Lugano 3 | 1 ZSC Lions |
| ZSC Lions 3 | 5 HC Lugano |
| HC Lugano 1 | 3 ZSC Lions |
| ZSC Lions 2 | 3 HC Lugano |
| HC Lugano 3 | 1 ZSC Lions |
HC Lugano wins series 4–1

HC Davos vs. SC Bern
| Away | Home | |
|---|---|---|
| SC Bern 1 | 5 HC Davos | |
| HC Davos 3 | 2 SC Bern | n.P. |
| SC Bern 3 | 2 HC Davos | |
| HC Davos 2 | 4 SC Bern | |
| SC Bern 1 | 5 HC Davos | |
| HC Davos 0 | 3 SC Bern | |
| SC Bern 0 | 3 HC Davos | |
HC Davos wins series 4–3

=== Finals ===
HC Davos vs. HC Lugano
| Away | Home |
|---|---|
| HC Lugano 2 | 3 HC Davos |
| HC Davos 3 | 2 HC Lugano |
| HC Lugano 5 | 3 HC Davos |
| HC Davos 3 | 4 HC Lugano |
| HC Lugano 3 | 0 HC Davos |
| HC Davos 0 | 4 HC Lugano |
HC Lugano wins series 4–2

=== Scoring leaders ===
Note: GP = Games played; G = Goals; A = Assists; Pts = Points; PIM = Penalty Minutes

| Player | Team | GP | G | A | Pts | PIM |
|---|---|---|---|---|---|---|
| Brandon Convery | HC Lugano | 16 | 5 | 14 | 19 | 16 |
| Mike Maneluk | HC Lugano | 15 | 11 | 6 | 17 | 18 |
| André Rötheli | HC Lugano | 15 | 6 | 6 | 12 | 2 |
| Christian Dubé | SC Bern | 13 | 4 | 8 | 12 | 12 |
| Reto von Arx | HC Davos | 17 | 4 | 8 | 12 | 28 |
| Kevin Miller | HC Davos | 17 | 8 | 3 | 11 | 4 |
| Régis Fuchs | HC Lugano | 16 | 6 | 5 | 11 | 2 |
| Yves Sarault | SC Bern | 13 | 4 | 6 | 10 | 26 |
| Josef Marha | HC Davos | 17 | 4 | 6 | 10 | 6 |
| Petteri Nummelin | HC Lugano | 8 | 3 | 7 | 10 | 2 |
