= Conrad Charles Frédéric d'Andlau-Birseck =

Governor-general of the former Prince-Bishopric of Basel (1766–1839)

- Born: 23 December 1766; Arlesheim, Prince-Bishopric of Basel
- Died: 25 October 1839 (aged 72); Freiburg im Breisgau, Grand Duchy of Baden
- Occupations: Statesman and administrator
- Spouse(s): Marie-Sophie, Baroness of Schakmin
- Parent: François Charles d'Andlau (father)

Conrad Charles Frédéric d'Andlau-Birseck (23 December 1766 – 25 October 1839), also known as Konrad Karl Friedrich von Andlau-Birseck, was a statesman and administrator from the Prince-Bishopric of Basel who pursued a career in the service of Further Austria and the Grand Duchy of Baden, and who in 1814–1815 served as the Allied governor-general of the former Prince-Bishopric of Basel.

== Biography ==
Andlau-Birseck was born on 23 December 1766 in Arlesheim, the son of François Charles d'Andlau and Balbine de Staal. In 1798 he married Marie-Sophie, Baroness of Schakmin. A page of the prince-bishop of Basel, he attended the college of Porrentruy and became a chamberlain in 1783. After studying law at Würzburg, he was an assessor at the Aulic Council in Porrentruy in 1788, and in 1791 he represented the nobility at the estates of the bishopric of Basel.

Faced with the advance of French troops in 1792, Andlau-Birseck fled Porrentruy together with the prince-bishop Franz Joseph Sigismund von Roggenbach and his court, taking refuge in Biel. After the death of his father on 25 November 1792, the bishop appointed him bailiff of Birseck, an office he never took up because of the French occupation. In 1793 he settled in Olten, and in 1797 he moved with his family to Freiburg im Breisgau. During his stay in Switzerland he sought, as a Swiss citizen, to have himself removed from the list of émigrés in order to recover the family property in the occupied bishopric, which he achieved only in 1801. At Freiburg, by contrast, he had his membership of the imperial nobility confirmed, which allowed him to begin a new career, the Breisgau being part of Further Austria.

Andlau-Birseck was a councillor of state (around 1800–1801), administrator of the Breisgau and the Ortenau (1802), and vice-president of the government—an office comparable to that of a deputy prefect—in 1803. After the Breisgau was joined to the principality of Baden, he became president of the government (prefect) at Freiburg (1806) and a judge (Hofrichter) of the Grand Duchy of Baden (1807). He took part in several diplomatic missions to Paris (1806–1810) and Vienna (1809), and from 1810 to 1813 he was Baden's minister of the interior at Karlsruhe.

On 15 January 1814, at Basel, Emperor Francis I of Austria appointed him—at the instigation of his cousin Prince Klemens von Metternich—governor-general of the Allies for the Franche-Comté, the department of the Vosges, and the principalities of Porrentruy and Montbéliard, with his seat at Vesoul. After the first Treaty of Paris (30 May 1814), the governorate-general was limited to the former bishopric of Basel, and in June 1814 Andlau-Birseck established its seat at Arlesheim. Together with his brother-in-law Ursanne Conrad Joseph de Billieux d'Ehrenfeld, he attempted without success to attach the principality of Porrentruy to Switzerland as a canton, if possible under the authority of the prince-bishop, thereby coming into conflict with the plans of the victorious powers, the Federal Diet, and the canton of Bern. In the summer of 1814 he even drew up a draft constitution for the new canton, which he submitted to Metternich.

His administration had to contend with the requisitions imposed by the victors, with the resistance fomented by Bern in the part of the former bishopric formerly allied with the Confederation (the southern Jura), and with the population's disagreement over its political future. The deputation he sent to the Congress of Vienna under the direction of Billieux d'Ehrenfeld ultimately obtained, through the settlement of Swiss affairs of 20 March 1815, that the whole of the former bishopric be attached to Switzerland, but could not prevent the division of its territory between the cantons of Bern and Basel. On 23 August 1815, Andlau-Birseck ceded the territory to the federal commissioner Johann Conrad Escher before returning, in October 1815, to Freiburg im Breisgau. The settlement of debts between the Allies and the Confederation occupied him from 1815 to 1817, and he was again a judge of the Grand Duchy of Baden from 1817 to 1833.

To the family property recovered in 1801 in the then-French Birseck, Andlau-Birseck added other holdings, such as the castle of Birseck and that of Hugstetten near Freiburg im Breisgau, inherited through marriage in 1806. Together with the canon Jean Henri Hermann de Gléresse, he had the English garden and the Hôtel d'Andlau at Arlesheim redesigned in 1811–1812.

== Bibliography ==
- M. Jorio, Der Untergang des Fürstbistums Basel (1792–1815), 1982, 234–237
- V. Hug, Die Eremitage in Arlesheim, part 1, 2008, 74–87
- V. Hug, "Conrad Carl Friedrich von Andlau-Birseck (1766–1839), Generalgouverneur des Fürstentums Pruntrut", in De la crosse à la croix, ed. J.-C. Rebetez, D. Bregnard, 2018, 123–145
