= Joseph Bernard de Billieux d'Ehrenfeld =

Swiss Roman Catholic canon (1750–1824)

- Born: 16 March 1750; Porrentruy, Prince-Bishopric of Basel
- Died: 13 March 1824 (aged 73); Porrentruy, canton of Bern, Switzerland
- Occupation: Catholic canon

Joseph Bernard de Billieux d'Ehrenfeld, in German Joseph Bernhard von Billieux von Ehrenfeld (16 March 1750 – 13 March 1824), was a Swiss Roman Catholic canon.

== Biography ==
Billieux d'Ehrenfeld was born on 16 March 1750 in Porrentruy, the son of Dominique Joseph, and was a citizen of Porrentruy. He was the brother of Aloyse, André François Xavier, Ignace, and Ursanne Conrad Joseph.

He studied at the college of Porrentruy and at the Collegium Germanicum in Rome, and held a doctorate in theology. He became a canon at Zurzach in 1772 and cantor of the chapter in 1810. He was also a canon of the cathedral chapter of the diocese of Constance and a knight of the Holy Roman Empire.

== Bibliography ==
- E.-F. de Mülinen, "Rauracia sacra ou dictionnaire historique du clergé catholique jurassien", in Actes de la Société jurassienne d'émulation, 1863, 201–328
