= Jean-Baptiste Georges d'Andlau =

Official of the Prince-Bishopric of Basel (1682–1746)

- Born: 29 December 1682; Delémont, Prince-Bishopric of Basel
- Died: 12 April 1746 (aged 63); Arlesheim, Prince-Bishopric of Basel
- Occupation: Court official
- Spouse: Catharina Truchsess von Wolhusen
- Children: François Charles d'Andlau

Jean-Baptiste Georges d'Andlau, in German Johann Baptist Georg von Andlau (29 December 1682 – 12 April 1746), was an official of the Prince-Bishopric of Basel who served as bailiff of the lordship of Birseck.

== Biography ==
Andlau was born on 29 December 1682 in Delémont, the son of Ernst Friedrich d'Andlau, of Ensisheim in Alsace, who was bailiff of the town and lordship of Delémont and of the provostry of Moutier-Grandval. Through his mother he was a nephew of Johann Konrad von Reinach-Hirtzbach, prince-bishop of Basel. In 1711 he married Catharina, daughter of Franz Ludwig Truchsess von Wolhusen.

Andlau was grand master and aulic councillor at the court of Porrentruy in 1710, and bailiff of the lordship of Birseck from 1714 to 1746.
