= Aloyse de Billieux d'Ehrenfeld =

Swiss Roman Catholic vicar-general (1758–1830)

- Born: Aloyse Joseph Melchior de Billieux d'Ehrenfeld; 10 December 1758; Porrentruy, Prince-Bishopric of Basel
- Died: 27 June 1830 (aged 71); Porrentruy, canton of Bern, Switzerland
- Occupations: Catholic priest and vicar-general

Aloyse de Billieux d'Ehrenfeld, in German Aloyse von Billieux von Ehrenfeld (10 December 1758 – 27 June 1830), was a Swiss Roman Catholic priest who served as provost of the collegiate chapter of Saint-Ursanne and later as vicar-general for the Jura.

== Biography ==
Billieux d'Ehrenfeld was born on 10 December 1758 in Porrentruy, the son of Dominique Joseph, and was a citizen of Porrentruy. He was the brother of André François Xavier, Ignace, Joseph Bernard, and Ursanne Conrad Joseph. He studied at Porrentruy, Dijon, and Rome, earning a doctorate in theology at Rome, and was ordained in 1783.

Billieux d'Ehrenfeld entered the collegiate chapter of Saint-Ursanne in 1779, where he succeeded his uncle and godfather Melchior Joseph Tardy as provost, and became custodian of the chapter in 1787. He worked actively on the revision of the chapter's statutes and represented it at the estates of the bishopric of Basel, convened by the prince-bishop Franz Joseph Sigismund von Roggenbach in 1791. He then emigrated to Zurzach, where his brother Joseph Bernard was a canon.

After his return, Billieux d'Ehrenfeld was appointed episcopal commissioner in 1815 and, in 1818, pro-vicar-general for the Jura, thereby becoming the spiritual head of the Jura Catholics. He was a non-resident canon of the new diocese of Basel from 1828 and vicar-general in 1829. He reorganized the college of Porrentruy, promoted the re-establishment of the Ursuline convent in the town, and secured the reopening of the faculty of theology at the college in 1817 and of the seminary in 1821. From 1812 to 1814, he had a meridian installed at the college of Porrentruy.

== Works ==
- Notice sur la méridienne du collège de Porrentruy et sur son usage, 1818

== Bibliography ==
- Sammlung bernischer Biographien, vol. 1, 1884, 494–501
- Helvetia Sacra, I/1, 264
- E. Guéniat, "La méridienne du collège de Porrentruy", in Actes de la Société jurassienne d'émulation, 1975, 397–399
