= Dominique Joseph de Billieux d'Ehrenfeld =

Chancellor of the Prince-Bishopric of Basel (1717–1783)

- Born: 30 January 1717; Saint-Ursanne, Prince-Bishopric of Basel
- Died: 19 July 1783 (aged 66); Porrentruy, Prince-Bishopric of Basel
- Occupations: Jurist and statesman
- Spouse: Marthe Marie Thérèse Tardy
- Children: Joseph Bernard; André François Xavier; Aloyse; Ursanne Conrad Joseph; Ignace

Dominique Joseph de Billieux d'Ehrenfeld, in German Dominik Joseph von Billieux von Ehrenfeld (30 January 1717 – 19 July 1783), was a jurist and statesman of the Prince-Bishopric of Basel who served as its chancellor from 1763 to 1783.

== Biography ==
Billieux was born on 30 January 1717 in Saint-Ursanne, the son of Jean Bernard de Billieux, master-burgher and later lieutenant of the lordship of Saint-Ursanne (1701–1746) and aulic councillor (1744), and of Marie Françoise Hennet. In 1743 he married Marthe Marie Thérèse Tardy, daughter of Jean Germain Tardy, provost of Porrentruy. In 1782 he was ennobled by Emperor Joseph II with the title "d'Ehrenfeld".

Billieux attended the college of Porrentruy from 1731 to 1738, studied law in Germany with a placement at a lawyer's office in Wetzlar, and earned a doctorate in law from the University of Besançon in 1740. He became an advocate at the court of Porrentruy in 1740, syndic of the estates of the bishopric of Basel from 1740 to 1746, private secretary to the prince-bishop, secretary of the aulic council from 1745 to 1763, a privy councillor, and finally chancellor from 1763 to 1783.

A leading figure, Billieux was involved in all the important affairs of the bishopric for nearly half a century. As syndic of the estates, he helped settle the disputes that followed the unrest in the bishopric and persuaded the prince to appoint a president to head the estates. He resolved several conflicts: in 1749 that with the Margrave of Baden over the lordship of Schliengen; in 1757–1758 that between Biel and Bern; and in 1782 that between Moutier-Grandval and the estates.

On his initiative, and with the diplomatic collaboration of the abbé Jean Fau de Raze, the bishopric's chargé d'affaires in Paris, the major agreements of the late 18th century were concluded: in 1779 the exchange of parishes between the dioceses of Basel and Besançon; and in 1780 a treaty on the boundaries of sovereignty between the bishopric of Basel and France, together with a treaty of alliance between the prince-bishop and the king. This resolutely pro-French policy had the unexpected consequence of introducing the Revolution into the bishopric in 1791–1793. In the words of the pastor Théophile Rémy Frêne, Billieux had the qualities of a "great statesman".

== Bibliography ==
- Sammlung bernischer Biographien, vol. 1, 1884, 490–494
