= Bernard Comment =

Swiss writer, translator, scriptwriter and publisher

Bernard Comment (born 20 April 1960) is a Swiss writer, translator, scriptwriter, and publisher of books.

== Early life ==
Bernard Comment was born in Porrentruy, Switzerland, on 20 April 1960. He is a son of the artist Jean-François Comment. His elder brother Gerard is the proprietor of a record store Collector Shop in his hometown.

== Education ==
Comment studied Literature at the University of Geneva under Jean Starobinski and at the School for Advanced Studies in the Social Sciences in Paris under Roland Barthes.

== Career ==
Comment moved to Tuscany, where for four years he taught at the University of Pisa. He worked as a sports journalist, before moving to Paris to join as a research fellow at the School for Advanced Studies in the Social Sciences.

=== Literary ===
He published his first novel L'ombre de mémoire in 1990. Between 1993 and 1994, he was awarded a residential fellowship at the Villa Médicis, which inspired a tract against this kind of State-supported grants.

Comment has translated several books of Antonio Tabucchi into French.

In 2005, he succeeded Denis Roche as director at Fiction & Cie, and was appointed president of the Commission of the Novel at the Centre national du livre, which he held till 2008.

In 2010, with Stanley Buchthal, he edited Fragments, a collection of intimate writings, poems and letters of Marilyn Monroe.

=== Film and broadcasting ===
Along with Alain Tanner, he co-wrote the screenplays for the films Fourbi (1996), Requiem (1998), Jonas et Lila, Til Tomorrow (1999), Paul s'en va (2004). He also created with Bertrand Theubet, Le pied dans la fourmilière (1998) based on one of his novels.

He was a member of the international jury at the Locarno International Film Festival (1996) and Fribourg International Film Festival (1998).

In 1999, he was appointed as director of fiction at France Culture.

=== Other ===
In the 1980s, Comment was a secretary of the Swiss Association of Football Players.

From October 2011, he has been an advisor of programming at Arte.

== Awards and honours ==
- 1990: Prix Lipp Suisse for L'ombre de mémoire
- 1990: Prix de la République et Canton du Jura
- 1993: Prix Antigone for Allées et venues
- 1995: Award of Distinction of the Commission of French literature of the canton of Bern
- 2005: Award of the Canton of Bern for Un Poisson hors de l'eau
- 2010: Ordre des Arts et des Lettres
- 2011: Prix Goncourt de la Nouvelle for Tout passe

== Bibliography ==
=== Novels ===
- L'Ombre de mémoire, éditions Christian Bourgois, 1990 & Folio, 1999 (English: The Shadow of Memory)
- Allées et venues, éditions Christian Bourgois, 1992
- Florence, retours, éditions Christian Bourgois, 1994 & Éditions Gallimard|Folio, 2000
- Le Colloque des bustes, éditions Christian Bourgois, 2000 & Éditions Gallimard|Folio, 2002
- Un Poisson hors de l'eau, Éditions du Seuil, 2004 & Éditions Points, 2007
- Triptyque de l'ongle, Joca Seria, 2008

=== Essays and stories ===
==== Collections ====
- Roland Barthes, vers le Neutre, éditions Christian Bourgois, 1991
- Le XIXe siècle des panoramas, Adam Biro, 1993
- Les fourmis de la gare de Berne, Editions Zoe, 1996
- L'Ongle noir, Éditions Mille et une nuits, 1997
- Éclats cubains, with photographs by Jean-Luc Cramatte, Verticales/Grimoux, 1998
- Die Frauen der Antike, with Anselm Kiefer, éditions Yvon Lambert, 1999.
- The Panorama, Reaktion Books (London) and Abrams (New York).
- Même les oiseaux, éditions Christian Bourgois, 1998 & J'ai lu, 2000
- Doucet de fonds en combles, trésors d'une bibliothèque d'art, Herscher, 2004
- Entre deux, une enfance en Ajoie, Biro Editeur, 2007
- Comment, Bernard (2011). Tout passes. Christian Bourgois.

==== List of stories ====
Title	Year	First published	Reprinted/collected	Notes
A failure			Comment, Bernard (2011). Tout passes. Christian Bourgois.; Comment, Bernard (Autumn 2014). "A failure". Meanjin. 73 (1). Translated by Carolyne Lee: 169–172.	

=== As editor ===
- Comment, Bernard; Stanley Buchtal (eds.). Fragments : poems, intimate notes, letters by Marilyn Monroe.

=== Translations ===
- Rêves de rêves, by Antonio Tabucchi. (1994)
- Récits complets : Le Jeu de l'envers – Petits malentendus sans importance – L'Ange noir, by Antonio Tabucchi. (1995)
- Il se fait tard de plus en plus tard, by Antonio Tabucchi. (2002)
