= Florian Froehlich =

Swiss artist

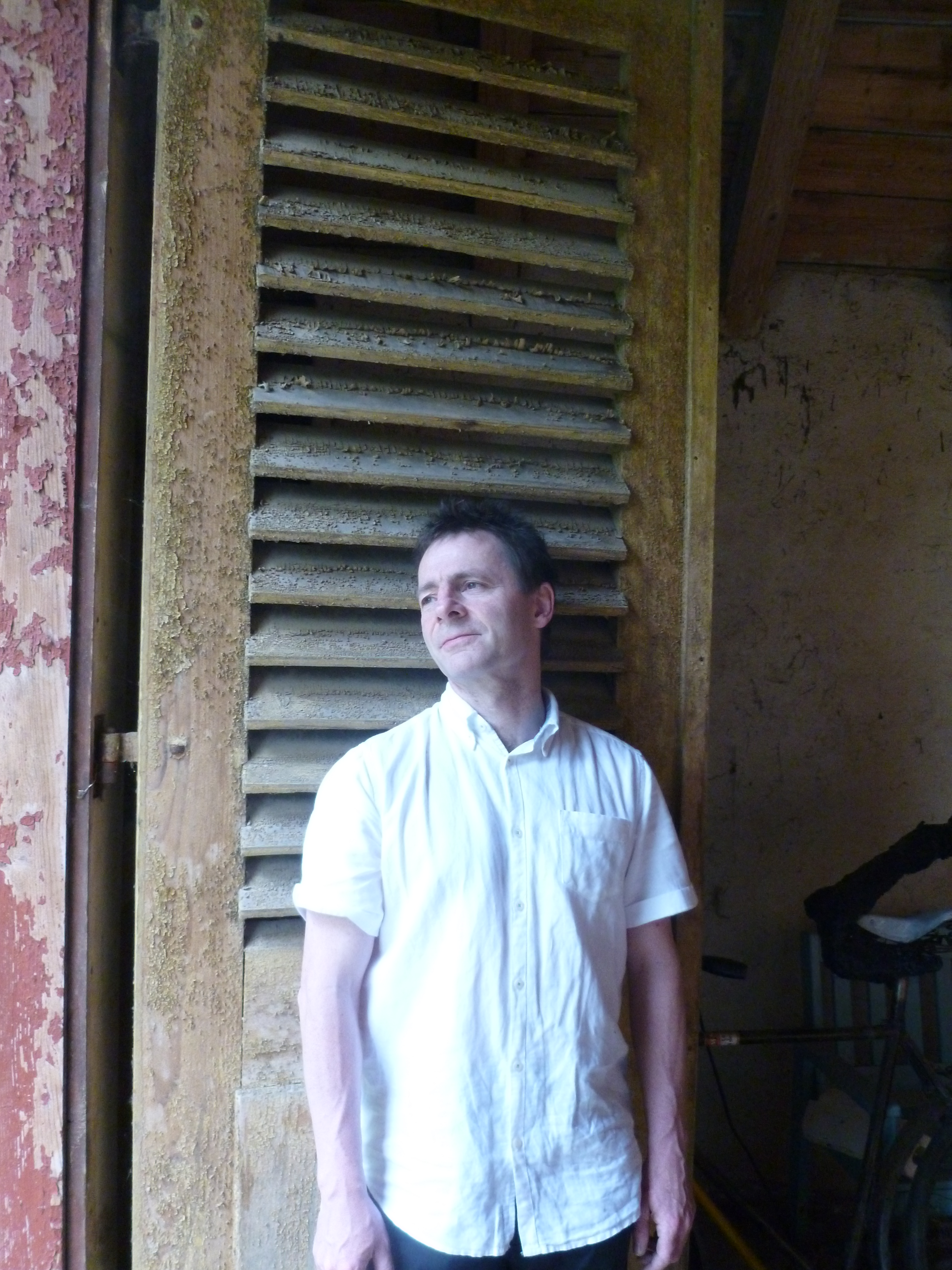
- Florian Froehlich in 2022
- Born: 17 December 1959; Pfäffikon
- Occupation: Painter
- Website: florianfroehlich.com

Florian Froehlich (born December 17, 1959, in Pfaeffikon in Switzerland), is a contemporary artist who creates paintings, sculptures, stained-glass, and installations.

== The artist ==
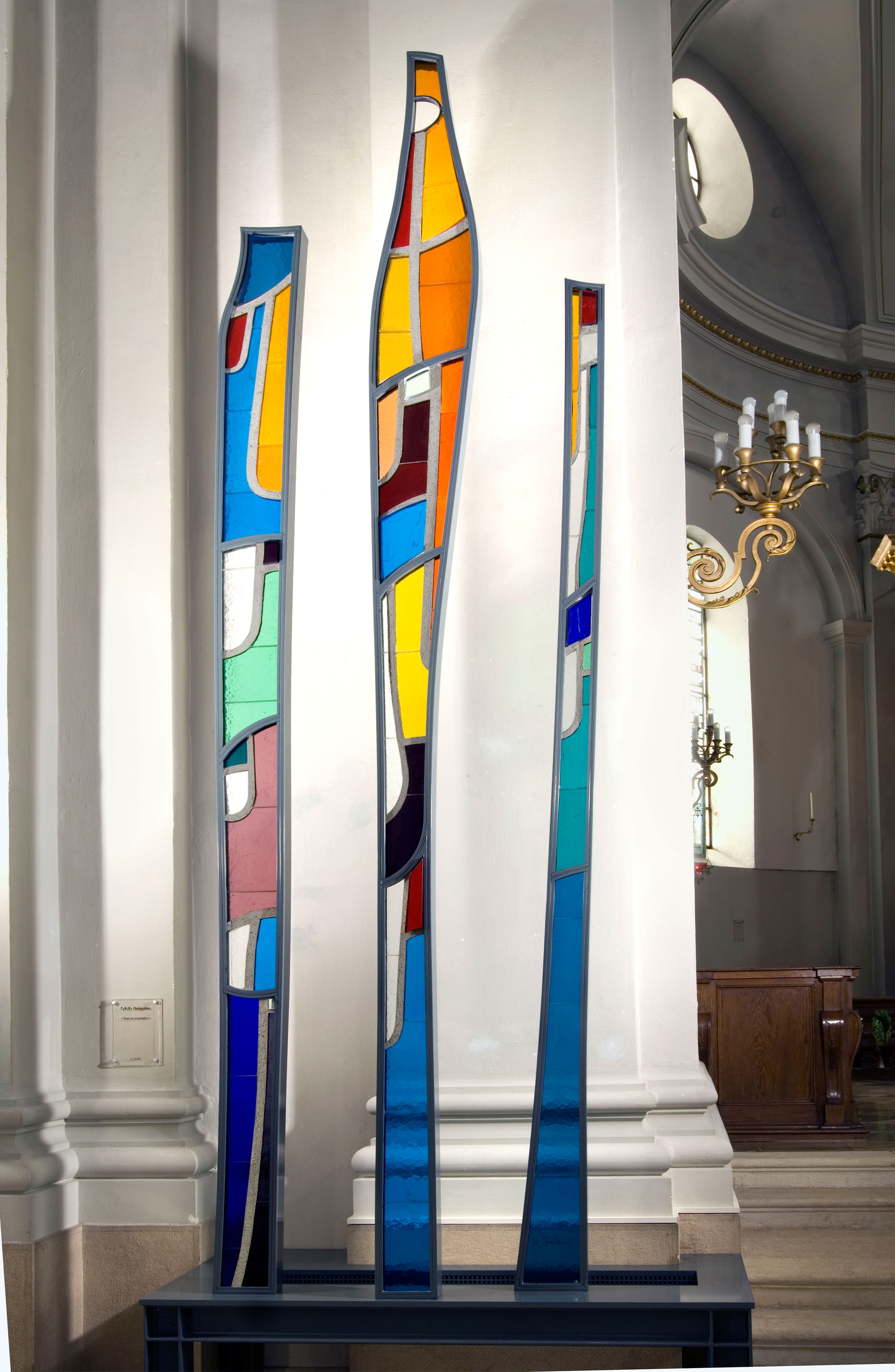
Golgotha – Stained glass and steel sculptures, 400 cm. Back-lighting with 2000 W. Part of the Saignelégier project.

Florian Froehlich was, when starting out in art, strongly influenced by the School of Paris, in particular by artists such as Maurice Estève, Charles Lapicque and Nicolas de Staël. He had had contacts with the world of art on a regular basis from childhood on, as he is related to the famous Zurich art dealer Peter Nathan. He trained in medicine at the Universities of Zurich and Lausanne until 1996 and thereafter developed a progressive and lasting activity as an artist in tandem with his professional life. He is living since 1996 in Porrentruy in the Swiss Jura. His close friendship and collaboration with the Swiss artist Jacques Minala lead him to become familiar with the technique of stained glass. Since 2003, he is member of the Swiss Stained Glass Artists Society Verarte.ch which led to several group exhibitions in the Vitromusée Suisse de Romont, in particular in 2009.

From 2003 to 2009, Froehlich worked intensely on the "Saignelégier Steles" for the catholic church in Saignelégier, Jura Switzerland, project which received national funding from the Swiss Confederation, and which was executed in collaboration with the glass master-craftsman Roland Béguin), and the metalwork artist J.-P. Scheuner using experimental techniques. The novel concept of the stele allows keeping all the church's luminosity by occupying only a very limited space. In contrast to normal stained glass which is not lit, Froehlich is using in Saignelégier artificial light: indeed, three steles, called the Golgotha group, are strongly backlit. Every of the 21 four-meter high steles is associated with a text from the bible commented by Father Bernard Miserez. The dalle glass was produced specifically for this project, in Waldsassen (Germany). The Saignelégier Steles are a novel contribution to contemporary sacred glasswork.

Occasionally, Froehlich creates in relation to world events, such as for the Jura leg of the Tour de France 2012: he showed an art installation exhibited to thousands of spectators over a 24-hour period on July 8, 2012. In 2012 and 2013, his work was presented at the Berliner Liste, a reputed and selective international art fair.

Since 2010, Froehlich has worked very regularly with the ACHTZIG Gallery for Contemporary Fine Art in Berlin. The ACHTZIG Gallery staged a solo exhibition of Froehlich's work in December 2013, entitled "World Theatre-Theatre World". At his occasion a book with his same title has been published by Editions Le Renard par la Queue, Lausanne, directed by the author Ferenc Rákóczy in a contemporary design by Chloé Donzé and contributions by the journalist José Ribeaud. Currently, Froehlich's work is focusing on the human being and the interaction between individual and crowds. Froehlich creates a kind of virtual human microcosmos notably by micro-sculptures integrated in painting-sculptures and sculpture-paintings. In fall 2013, Froehlich had the novel idea to suggest the scenic integration of microsculptures in watches. This idea was officially presented to Swiss watchmakers, with the support of Pascal Bourquard and BIWI.

From 2015 on, Froehlich has gradually begun to change his focus from crowds to the human being in all their various individualities, with the Renaissance as his gateway to the subject, having concentrated mainly on sketching over a period of two years. The artist has, for example, used a pre-existing drawing or art work which he has magnified, while often focussing on amplifying a specific detail. This has given his compositions an amplitude and a liberty which bring them into line with the spirit of our times, using a multitude of techniques: pencil, charcoal, water colour, collage, acrylics and even encaustic painting, a very ancient technique using beeswax. The spirit of the Renaissance pervades his work: the intellectual excursion into humanism, a perfect mastery of the use of perspective and the magic that is beauty. Froehlich rejuvenates this era with an artistic vision which is both new and contemporary. One of the focuses of Froehlich's work is the Biblical character, Haman, taking as his base a small sketch by Bartolomeo Passarotti whose subject was used in the painting of the ceiling of the Sistine Chapel by Michelangelo. Peter-Paul Rubens took up the subject of this sketch during the following century, reworking it in his manner. What liberty this inter-inspiration between artists permits! Pierre Hügli, an art magazine publisher wrote: “Who of the contemporary artists will show a passion for the sketches of the old masters, these riches hidden away in the archives, to the point of making them the starting point of a one-of-a-kind artistic creation?»

The culmination of Froehlich's work can be seen in this autumn 2018's exhibition « Renaissance Magic » at the BLOCH Foundation (FARB) in Delémont. Two concerts will take place in tandem with the exhibition, featuring among others the works of the Romantic composer, Friedrich Théodor Froehlich (1803–1836), friend of Franz Schubert and an ancestor of the artist.

Froehlich's reference to old master drawings is original and coherent. His paintings are inducing both contemplation and happiness. In fall 2020, the Centre Saint-François in Delémont (Jura) displays BETWEEN HEAVEN AND EARTH (entre Ciel et terre). The show has a symbolic duration of 365 days. The COVID-19 pandemic seems to energize the artist's creativity . Particular attention deserves his painting the COVID Christ (2020). This work is emblematic for Froehlich's way to create both a provocative and spiritual message, an artistic message of hope.

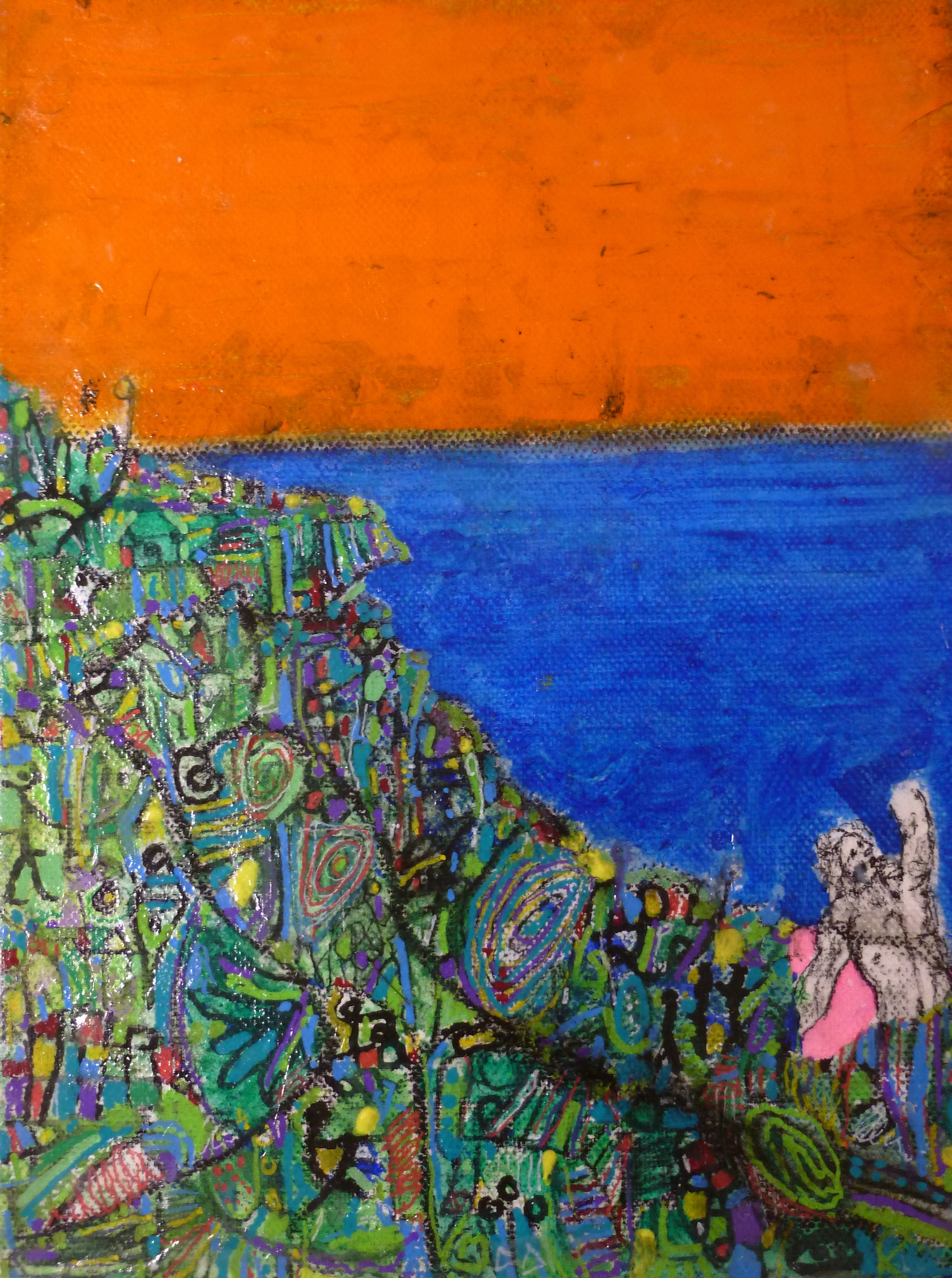
Permacosonis (Acores landscape), 2024, painting, 18 x 24 cm . mixed technic and polish

Since 2021, the park of the 19th century residence, Villa Dubail-Burrus that Florian Froehlich lives with his wife Isabelle and his family has been restored. The building inspired by French Baroque and its vast park regularly provide him with inspiration for his painting. Villa Dubail-Burrus becomes a member of Domus Antiqua Helvetica, the Swiss association of owners of historic residences

In 2022, Froehlich installed a stained glass work at the Porrentruy cemetery in memory of his late father-in-law, Claude Duthé, who died in 2019. Titled "fluxus vitae", the piece challenges the solemnity typically associated with cemeteries by celebrating life in the face of death. As with the Saignelégier steles, the work was created in close collaboration with the Béguin stained glass workshop in St Croix and locksmiths J. Pierre and Marianne Scheuner. The installation features a metallic spiral in ultramarine blue rising from Portuguese pink marble, twisting through space, wrapping around a face composed of coloured glass, before extending outward into infinity. The funerary plaque is made from semi-transparent Iranian pink onyx. The site will also serve as the family tomb.

In 2026, Florian Froehlich created a large stained-glass window, 11 meters high, for his own home—a historic 19th-century residence—which he named L’ENVOL. He used an innovative digital printing technique that applies natural pigments to float glass.

== Exhibitions ==
=== Individual exhibitions ===
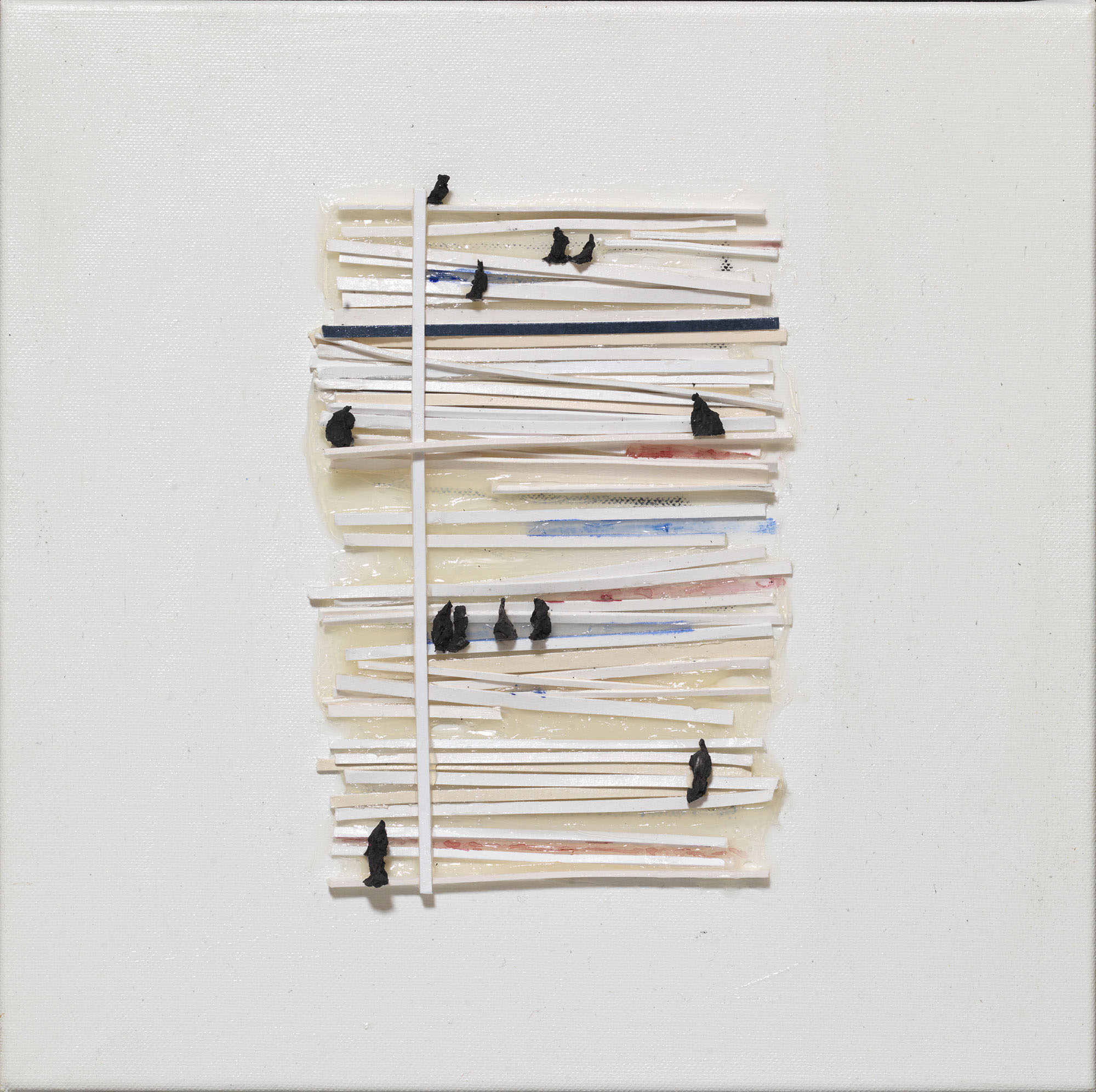
Life score – Sculpture, mixed media, cardboard. Canvas 30 x 30 cm

- 2025 : Renaissance einmal anders : Galerie Erstererster, Berlin, Germany
- 2020: Entre Ciel et Terre (between heaven and earth). Centre Saint-François, Delémont (JU)
- 2018 : Magie de la Renaissance Fondation Anne et Robert Bloch (FARB), Delémont (Suisse)
- 2013 : World Theatre-Theatre World, Achtzig Gallery for Contemporary Art, Berlin, Allemagne (décembre 2013).
- 2012 : Tour de France, Jura stage on July 8, 2012: "Finishing line" : an installation with multiple sculptures and an old dusty bike.
- 2007 : Galerie FARB, Delémont, Suisse
- 2005 : Galerie du Solstice, Yverdon/Treycovagnes, Suisse
- 2004 : Galerie du Solstice, Yverdon/Treycovagnes, Suisse
- 2003 : Galerie Catherine Clerc, Lausanne, Suisse
- 2002 : Galerie Paul Bovée, Delémont, Suisse
- 1998 : Galerie Courant d'Art, Chevenez, Suisse; Galerie Paul Bovée, Delémont, Suisse
- 1997 : Galerie Pingeot-Gerbi, Paris, France; Galerie Catherine Clerc, Lausanne, Suisse
- 1994 : Galerie Catherine Clerc, Lausanne, Suisse
- 1993 : Galerie de l'Evole99, Neuchâtel, Suisse
- 1992 : Fondation du Grand-Cachot-de-Vent, Vallée de La Brévine, Suisse
- 1991 : Galerie Jasmin, Zurich, Suisse; Galerie Black, Lausanne, Suisse
- 1989 : Galerie Jasmin, Zurich, Suisse.

=== Group exhibitions ===
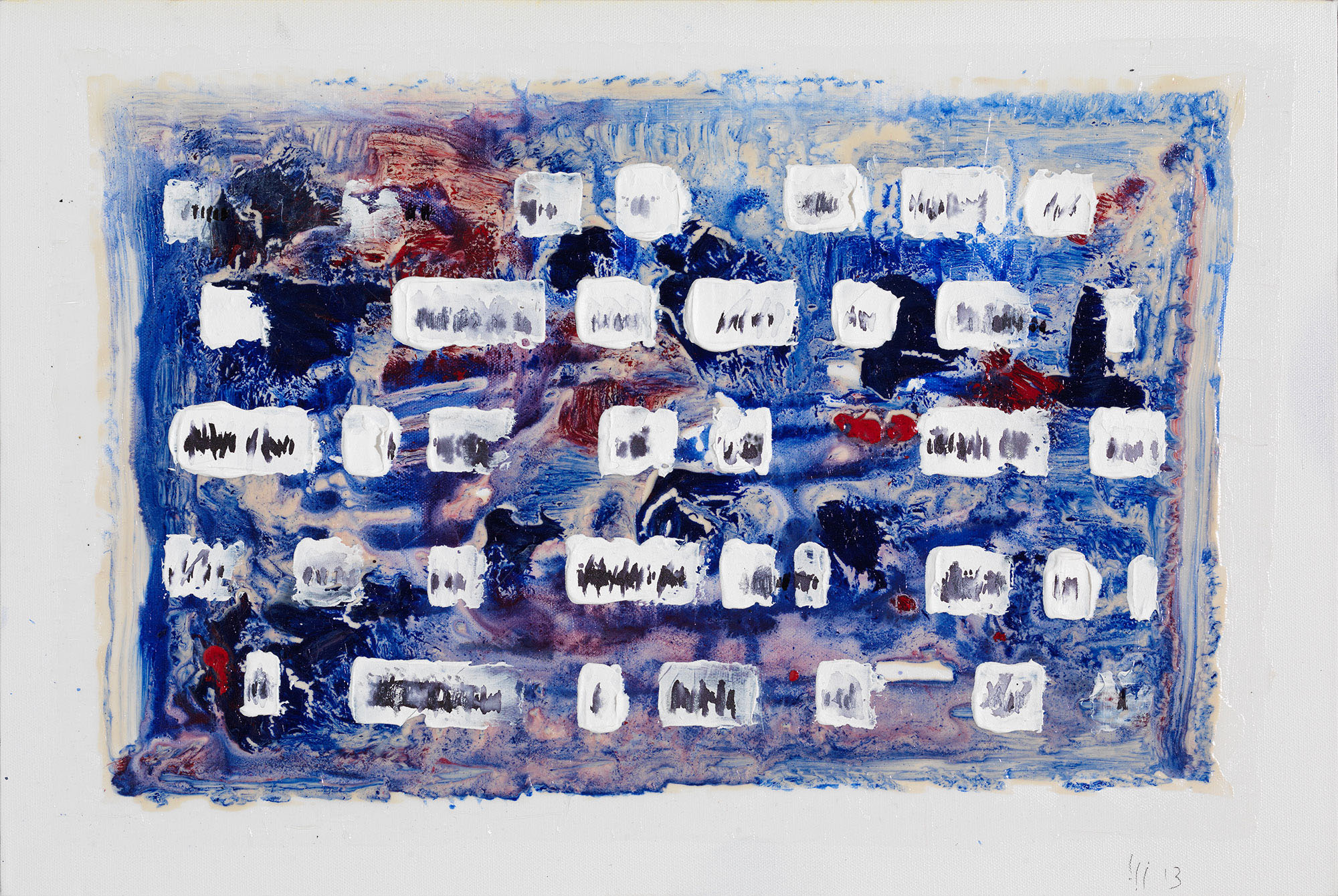
Lives in parallel – Mixed media and ink. Canvas, 40x60 cm

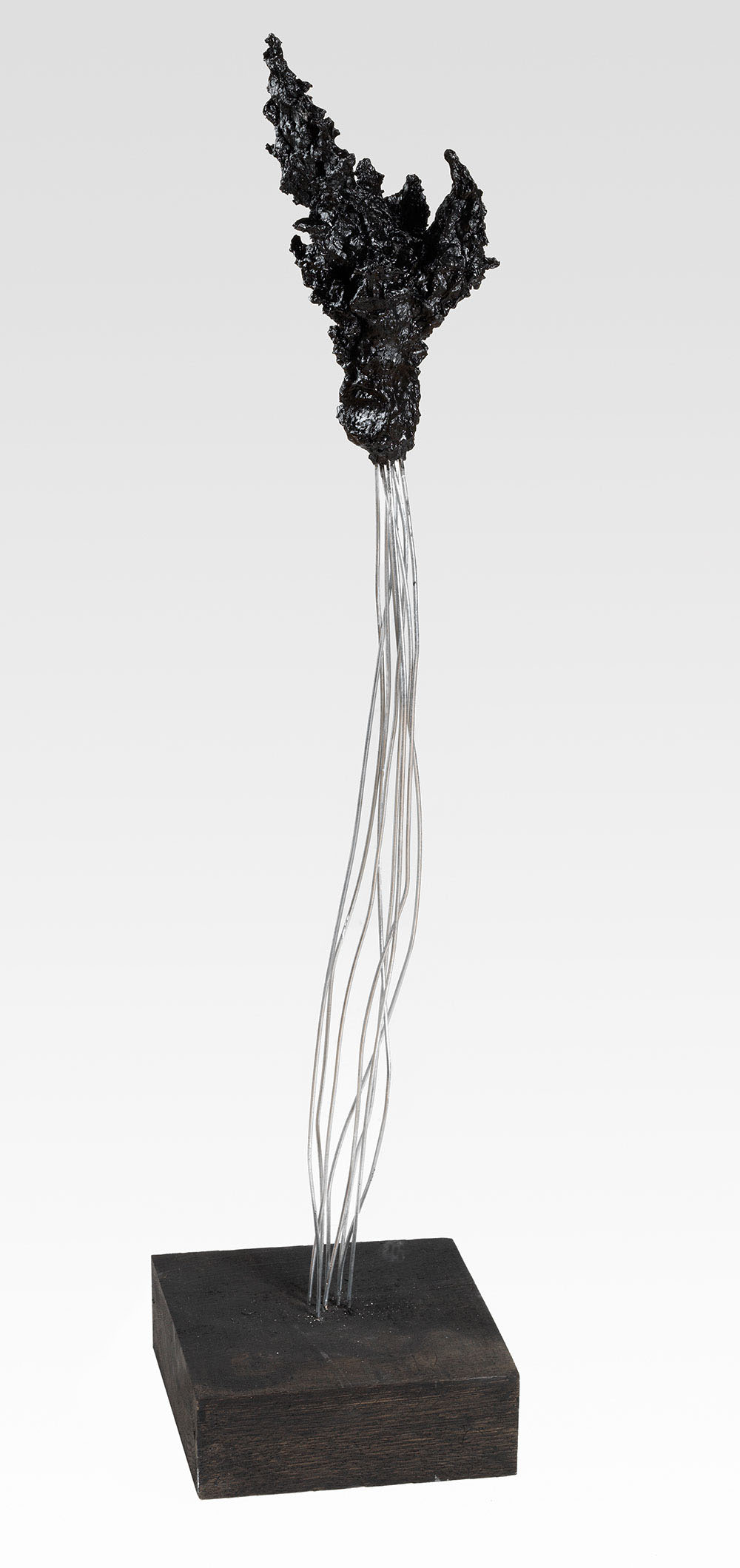
Human grape – Sculpture on wires. 19x 82 cm

- 2024 : Exposition pour le 70ème anniversaire de la SPSJ (Exhibition for the 70th anniversary of the SPSJ), Galerie Cave de Soyhières ( Jura)
- 2024 : "Une longue complicité" (with Jacques Minala) Galerie du Pavé, St-Ursanne
- 2023: Galerie Café du Soleil, Saignelégier, 26.11.23-14.1.24
- 2023: Biennale de la Société des Peintres et Sculpteurs Jurassiens SPSJ
- 2021: Biennale de la Société des Peintres et Sculpteurs Jurassiens SPSJ
- 2019: Biennale de la Société des Peintres et Sculpteurs Jurassiens SPSJ
- 2015 et 2017 : Biennale de la Société des Peintres et Sculpteurs Jurassiens SPSJ (http://www.spsj.ch)
- 2015 : Galerie Dukan Contemporary Art, Leipzig
- 2014: Group exhibitions, Achtzig Gallery for Contemporary Art, Berlin, Germany
- 2013: MicroArt: Exhibition of recent work to suggest the use of microsculptures in Swiss watchmaking. Plejouse, October 29, 2013
- 2013 : Galerie FARB, Delémont, Switzerland
- 2011–2013 : Achtzig Gallery for Contemporary Art, Berlin (plusieurs expositions en groupe)
- 2010 : Exposition City Landscapes, Achtzig Gallery for Contemporary Art, Berlin, Germany
- 2009 : Swiss Museum of Stained Glass and Glass Art, Romont (Vitromusée), Romont. Verarte.ch exhibition; du 4 avril au 20 septembre 2009; Galerie Meisterschüler, Berlin, Germany
- 2007 : Galerie Art Service, Château d'Eguilly, Eguilly, France; Galerie Bleu de Chine, Fleurier, Switzerland
- 2006 : Permanent exhibition of artworks, Galerie Alain Aubry, Paris, France
- 2005 : Verarte.ch : Exhibition of Glass Art, Elisabethenkirche, Bâle, Switzerland
- 2004 : Exposition au Musée suisse du vitrail et des arts du verre, organisé par Verarte.ch, Romont, Switzerland
- 2002 : Invitation to take part in a nationwide exhibition Expo 02; Kunstmuseum, La Chaux-de-Fonds, Switzerland
- 1998 : Centre d'Art en Face, Porrentruy, Switzerland
- 1994 : 120 artistes jurassiens (120 Jura artists), Delémont, Switzerland
- 1992 : Galerie 67, Bern, Switzerland

== Publications ==
- Florian FROEHLICH : Magie de la Renaissance. Un retour aux sources de la beauté. octobre 2018. ISBN 978-2-8399-2487-0
- Florian Froehlich : World Theatre – Theatre World. Éditions Le renard par la queue, CH-1005 Lausanne, ISBN 978-2-940533-00-8
- Glasmalerei für das 21. Jahrhundert : Malen mit Glas und Licht, ISBN 978-3-00-040422-1
- Biographisches Lexikon der Schweizer Kunst, Verlag Neue Zürcher Zeitung, ISBN 3-85823-673-X
