= François Augustin Roussel =

French revolutionary official (1756–after 1816)

- Born: 5 May 1756; Belfort, France
- Died: after 1816; Delémont, Switzerland
- Occupations: Lawyer; revolutionary official; judge
- Spouse: Claire Pauline Artus

François Augustin Roussel (5 May 1756 – after 1816) was a French official of the revolutionary period who administered the department of Mont-Terrible and later served as a judge at Delémont.

== Biography ==
Roussel was born on 5 May 1756 in Belfort and died after 1816 at Delémont. He married Claire Pauline Artus. A lawyer at the Sovereign Council of Alsace, he became secretary of the district of Belfort in 1790.

Roussel arrived in Porrentruy in 1793 with other revolutionary officials from Belfort and Delle. As administrator and president of the department of Mont-Terrible, he sat on the revolutionary tribunal during the Terror and was appointed procurator-general syndic under the Thermidorian Reaction. As commissioner of the Directory from November 1795 to April 1800, he secured his authority through his Alsatian connections, in particular his friendship with the director Jean-François Reubell. Under the Consulate he sought the sub-prefecture of Porrentruy without success, and became a judge at the civil court of the district of Delémont, which he presided over in 1807.

== Bibliography ==
- J.-R. Suratteau, "Un commissaire du Directoire, François-Augustin Roussel", in Annales historiques de la Révolution française, 29, October–December 1957, 316–339
- Dictionnaire biographique du Territoire de Belfort, 2, 2001, 539
