= Hélène Rivier =

Swiss librarian (1902–1986)

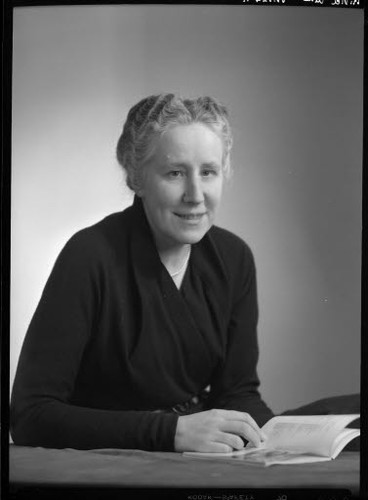
- Born: May 25, 1902; Porrentruy, Switzerland
- Died: February 11, 1986 (aged 83); Geneva Switzerland
- Occupation: librarian

Hélène Rivier (May 25, 1902 – February 11, 1986) was a Swiss librarian.

The daughter of Emile Théodore Rivier, a minister, and Annie Rose, she was born in Porrentruy and attended the Ecole de bibliothécaires in Geneva, graduating in 1928.

In 1931, she established the Bibliothèque Moderne at Geneva, the first free lending library available to the public in Switzerland. She was the first director of the Bibliothèque Municipale in Geneva, serving from 1941 to 1966. She also established library service for the sick in the canton hospital and the Saint-Antoine prison, set up a system of local library branches and established the first Swiss bookmobile in 1962.

Rivier died in Geneva at the age of 83.
