= Johann Rudolf Neuhaus =

Swiss industrialist and politician (1767–1846)

- Born: 5 December 1767; Biel, Switzerland
- Died: 27 February 1846 (aged 78); Biel, Switzerland
- Occupations: Industrialist; merchant; politician
- Spouse: Sophie Verdan

Johann Rudolf Neuhaus (5 December 1767 – 27 February 1846) was a Swiss industrialist, merchant, and politician, regarded as one of the most important pioneers of industry in Biel.

== Biography ==
Neuhaus was born on 5 December 1767 in Biel, the son of Johann Rudolf Neuhaus, a captain, and Susanna Magdalena Watt. In 1791 he married Sophie Verdan, daughter of the calico manufacturer François Verdan. He completed a commercial apprenticeship in Lyon from 1782 to 1784.

In 1787 Neuhaus founded a trading company with offices in Aix-en-Provence, Marseille, and Biel, which he had to liquidate during the French Revolution. As a partner in the Verdan calico-printing business, he saved it from bankruptcy and made it prosper. In 1794 he made an unsuccessful attempt to export cheese. In 1823 he founded the savings bank of Biel, and in 1824, together with his brother-in-law Johann Peter Huber, the cotton-spinning mill of Gurzelen.

Neuhaus served the town of Biel by taking part in diplomatic missions and by sitting on the town's Grand Council from 1797 and in the provisional government of 1813, as president of the finance commission. He was a deputy to the Bernese Grand Council from 1816 to 1826. He was behind the construction of the gymnasium (1817) and of the Berghaus orphanage (1834). One of the most important pioneers of industry in Biel, he left an autobiography.

== Bibliography ==
- 150 Jahre Ersparniskasse Biel, 1973 (contains the autobiography)
- W. Bourquin, M. Bourquin, Biel, stadtgeschichtliches Lexikon, 1999, 281
