= Porrentruy Castle =

Castle in Porrentruy, Switzerland

Coordinates: 47°25′10″N 7°04′21″E

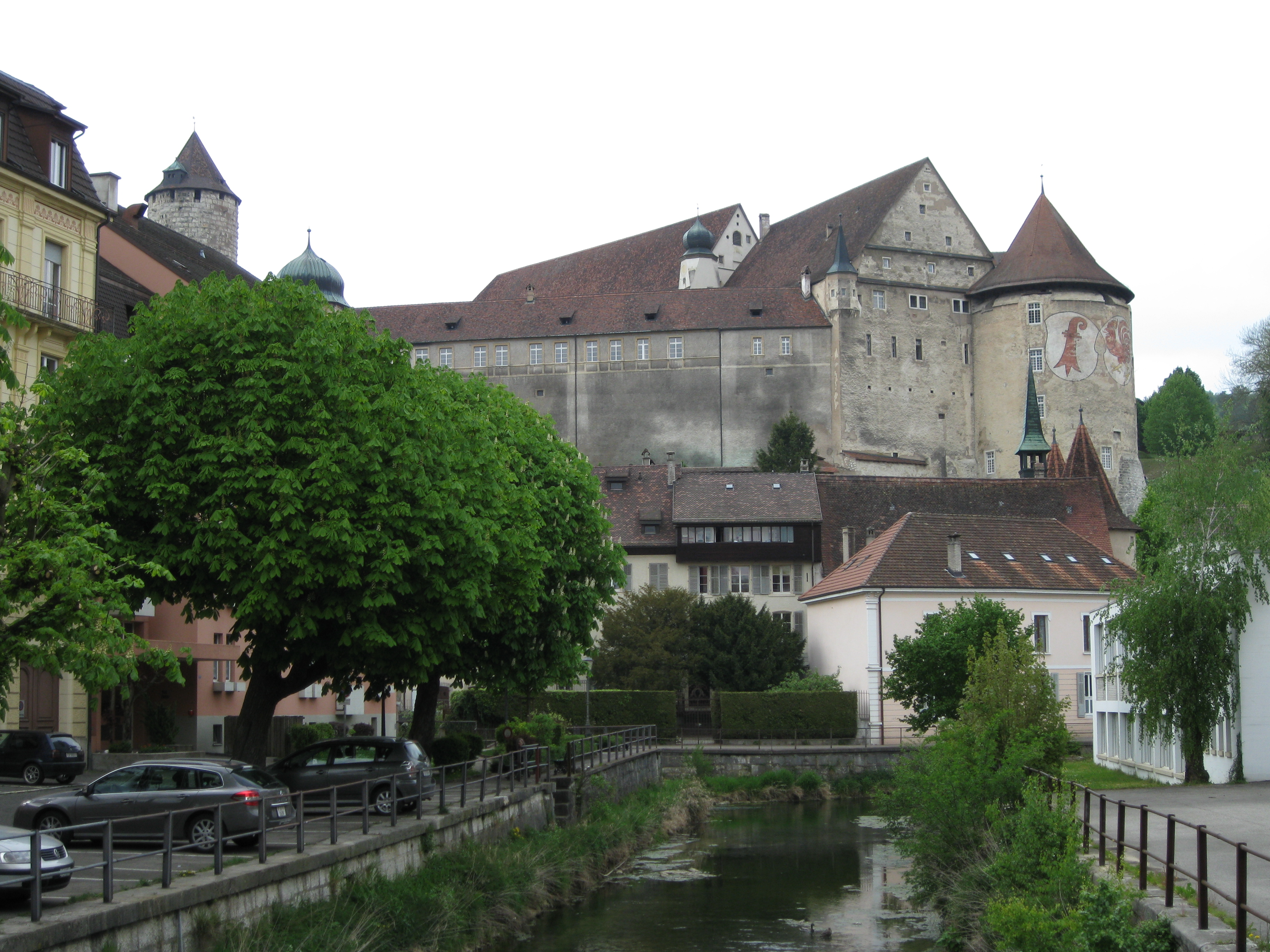
Porrentruy Castle

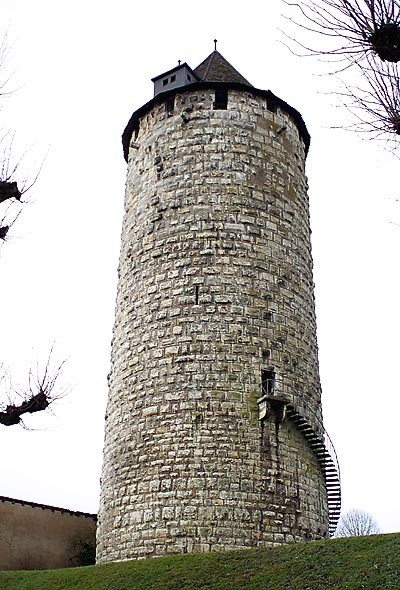
Porrentruy Castle: the Réfous Tower

Porrentruy Castle is a castle in the municipality of Porrentruy of the Canton of Jura in Switzerland. It is a Swiss heritage site of national significance.

Construction of the castle took place between the mid-thirteenth century and the beginning of the eighteenth century. The oldest part is the thirteenth century Réfous Tower (Tour Réfous). Fourteenth century ramparts survive on the western and northern sides.

Since 1271 belonging to the bishopric of Basel, the castle served as exile residence of the prince-bishops of Basel from 1527 until 1792. The bishops had been exiled from Basel during the Swiss Reformation in 1529, whereas they were able to keep most of their territories outside the city.

At the beginning of the nineteenth century the Romanesque chapel within the castle walls was destroyed.

== See also ==
- List of castles in Switzerland
