= Aloys von Orelli =

Swiss jurist and legal scholar

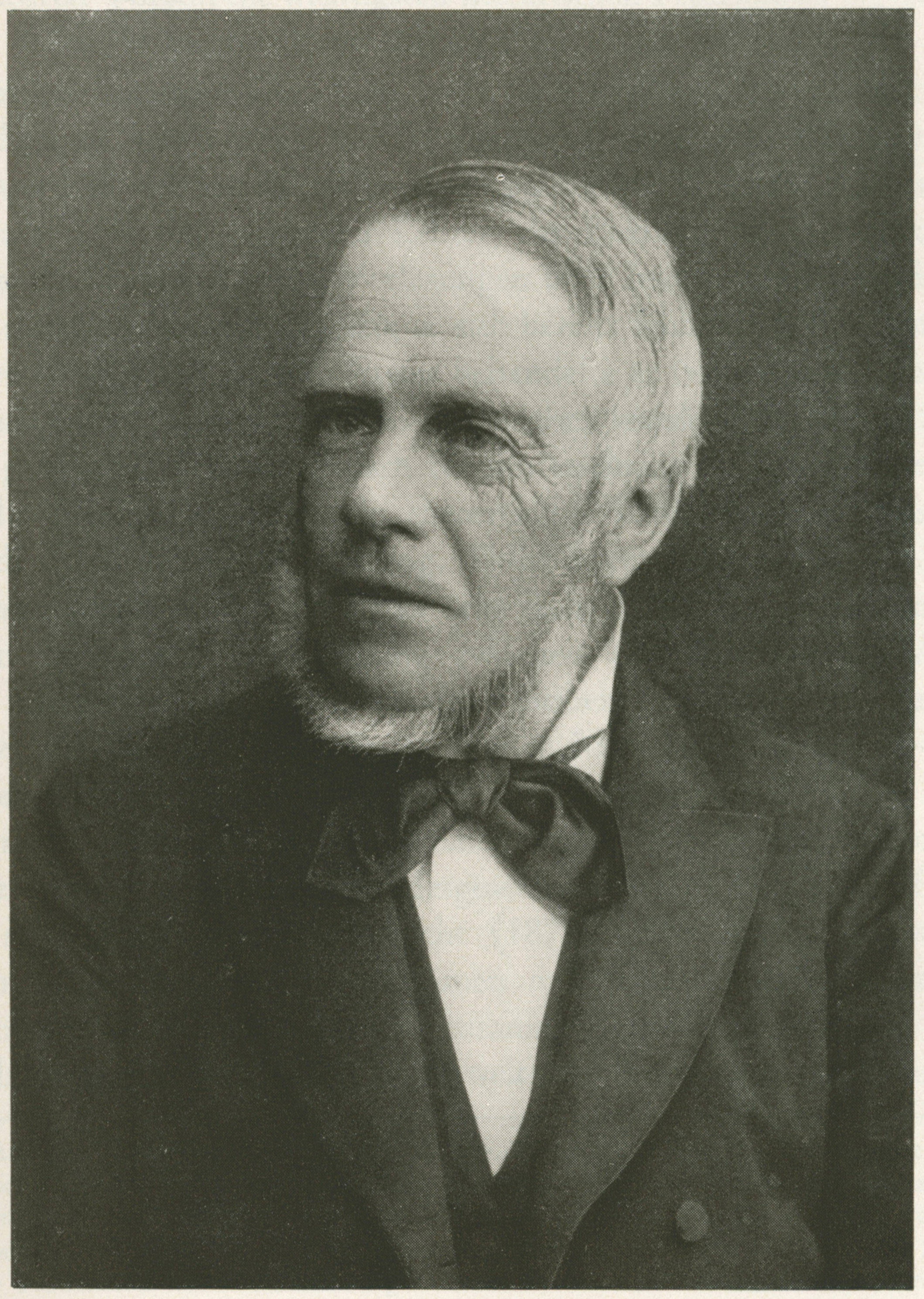
- Born: 18 January 1827; Zurich, Switzerland
- Died: 31 January 1892 (aged 65); Zurich, Switzerland
- Education: University of Zurich, University of Berlin
- Occupations: Jurist, legal scholar
- Known for: Studies in private law and copyright law
- Spouse: Pauline Hortense Escher (m. 1857)
- Parent(s): Johannes von Orelli (father); Dorothea Escher (mother)
- Relatives: Johann Conrad Escher (grandfather)

Aloys von Orelli (18 January 1827 – 31 January 1892) was a Swiss jurist and legal scholar who served as a professor at the University of Zurich and made significant contributions to private law and copyright law in the 19th century.

== Early life and education ==
Orelli was born on 18 January 1827 in Zurich to Johannes von Orelli, a banker, and Dorothea Escher. He was the grandson of Johann Conrad Escher. He belonged to the Protestant faith and was a citizen of Zurich.

He studied law at the University of Zurich and the University of Berlin, earning his doctorate in 1849. He subsequently pursued further studies in France and England.

== Academic career ==
Orelli began his academic career as a Privatdozent (lecturer) at the University of Zurich in 1853. He was appointed extraordinary professor from 1858 to 1864 and again from 1871 to 1873, before becoming an ordinary (full) professor, specializing in German law.

He focused his scholarly work on private law, which had been previously neglected, and on the newly created field of copyright law. His major works include Die Familie im deutschen und schweizerischen Recht (The Family in German and Swiss Law, 1859) and Der internationale Schutz des Urheberrechtes (The International Protection of Copyright, 1887).

== Political and judicial career ==
From 1862 to 1869, Orelli served as a cantonal judge. He was elected as a conservative deputy to the Grand Council of Zurich from 1869 to 1878. In 1877, he was elected president of the Swiss Society of Jurists.

He was made a knight of the Order of the Crown of Italy.

== Personal life ==
In 1857, Orelli married Pauline Hortense Escher, daughter of Heinrich Escher, a lieutenant-colonel.

Orelli died on 31 January 1892 in Zurich.

== Bibliography ==
- Fritzsche, H. (1957). Prof. Dr. jur. Aloys von Orelli (1827-1892) (with list of works).
