= Johann Conrad Escher =

Swiss politician (1761–1833)

Johann Conrad Escher vom Luchs

Burgomaster of the State of Zurich
- In office 1803–1814

Chancellor of Zurich
- In office 1794–1798

Personal details
- Born: 31 January 1761 Baden, Old Swiss Confederacy
- Died: 3 May 1833 (aged 72) Zurich, Switzerland (presumably)
- Spouse: Anna von Muralt (m. 1785)
- Parent(s): Johann Heinrich Escher; Dorothea Ott

Johann Conrad Escher vom Luchs (31 January 1761 – 3 May 1833) was a Swiss politician who served as Burgomaster of the State of Zurich from 1803 to 1814.

== Biography ==
Escher was born on 31 January 1761 in Baden to Johann Heinrich Escher, a member of the Small Council, and Dorothea Ott. He was a Protestant citizen of Zurich. In 1785, he married Anna von Muralt, daughter of Conrad von Muralt, a cavalry captain.

Escher began his political career as clerk of the Zurich health council in 1782. He was appointed substitute of the Council in 1783, chief substitute and secretary of legation in 1785, vice-chancellor in 1787, and chancellor in 1794. From 1798 to 1802, he served as a member of the administrative chamber of the Canton of Zurich, serving as its president in 1801–1802. In 1799, he was a member of the Grand Council of the Helvetic Republic and of the assembly of notables charged with preparing the new Helvetic Constitution.

Following the Act of Mediation, Escher served as Burgomaster of the State of Zurich from 1803 to 1814. In 1815, he was appointed Commissioner General of the Confederation in the former Prince-Bishopric of Basel. He served as a deputy to the Diet in 1805, 1811, 1817, and 1820. In 1818, he was an extraordinary delegate of Switzerland to the court of the Grand Duchy of Baden in Karlsruhe. In 1815, Escher received citizenship and patrician status in Bern.

Escher died on 3 May 1833, presumably in Zurich.

Aloys von Orelli was one of his grandchildren.

== Bibliography ==
- G. von Escher, Genealogie der Familie Escher vom Luchs, manuscript, undated (StAZ)
