= Régis Fuchs =

Swiss ice hockey player

- Born: April 6, 1970 (age 55); Porrentruy, Switzerland
- Height: 5 ft 7 in (170 cm)
- Weight: 174 lb (79 kg; 12 st 6 lb)
- Position: Winger
- Shot: Left
- Played for: HC La Chaux-de-Fonds (NLB); HC Martigny (NLB); HC Ajoie (NLB); SC Bern (NLA); HC Lugano (NLA); EHC Basel (NLA)
- Playing career: 1987–2013

Régis Fuchs (born April 6, 1970, in Porrentruy, Switzerland) is a Swiss professional ice hockey winger.

== Achievements ==
- 1997 - NLA Champion with SC Bern
- 1999 - NLA Champion with HC Lugano
- 2003 - NLA Champion with HC Lugano
- 2006 - NLA Champion with HC Lugano

== Records ==
Régis Fuchs is the only player to have participated in 8 NLA playoff final series.

== International play ==
Régis Fuchs played a total of 22 games for Swiss national team.

== Family ==
Fuchs has two sons who are currently playing hockey in Switzerland. Jason Fuchs (born September 14, 1995) plays for Lausanne HC in the Swiss National League, Robin Fuchs (born June 14, 1997) plays for CP Fleurier in the SwissDiv2.
