= François Charles d'Andlau =

Official of the Prince-Bishopric of Basel (1727–1792)

- Born: 19 June 1727; Arlesheim, Prince-Bishopric of Basel
- Died: 25 November 1792 (aged 65); Arlesheim, Prince-Bishopric of Basel
- Occupations: Court official and army officer
- Spouse: Balbine de Staal

François Charles d'Andlau, in German Franz Carl von Andlau (19 June 1727 – 25 November 1792), was an official of the Prince-Bishopric of Basel and an officer in the service of France, who served as the last bailiff of the lordship of Birseck.

== Biography ==
Andlau was born on 19 June 1727 in Arlesheim, the son of Jean-Baptiste Georges d'Andlau. In 1758 he married Balbine de Staal, daughter of Jean Conrad de Staal, who was one of the initiators of the English garden of the Ermitage at Arlesheim.

Andlau was a gentleman of the court of the prince-bishop of Basel, an aulic councillor from 1755, administrator of the lordship of Ajoie in 1758, and a privy councillor from 1782. From 1763 to 1792 he was the last bailiff of the lordship of Birseck. As a captain in the service of France, he was charged in 1758 with raising a company of the Eptingen regiment, of which he became the proprietor.

== Bibliography ==
- H. d'Andlau-Hombourg, Le livre d'histoire d'une famille d'Alsace, 2 vols., 1972–1976
- M. Jorio, Der Untergang des Fürstbistums Basel (1792–1815), 1982, 233–234
