= Alioth (disambiguation) =

Alioth is a star in the constellation Ursa Major

Alioth may also refer to:

- Alioth (Debian), a free software service
- Alioth (Marvel Cinematic Universe), a fictional entity created by Marvel Comics

== See also ==
- Daniel August Alioth
- Gabrielle Alioth
- Ludwig Rudolf Alioth
- Alioth Epsilon Fenrir
