= Industriegesellschaft für Schappe =

Former Swiss spun-silk company

- The company's works in Basel, aerial photograph by Walter Mittelholzer, 1924
- Industry: Textiles
- Predecessor: Chancel, Veillon, Alioth & Co.
- Founded: 1881
- Defunct: 1977
- Headquarters: , Switzerland
- Parent: Burlington Industries (from 1967)

The Industriegesellschaft für Schappe ("Industrial Company for Schappe") was a Swiss schappe (spun silk) spinning company. Its origins lay in the first mechanized schappe spinning mill in continental Europe, founded in Basel in 1824 by Johann Siegmund Alioth. The company was formed in 1881. In 1967 it was sold to the American company Burlington, which ran its mill in Arlesheim as Burlington Schappe AG until 1977.

== History ==
In 1824 Johann Siegmund Alioth founded the first mechanized schappe spinning mill in continental Europe in Basel, and in 1830 he moved it to Arlesheim. Mergers with mills in Grellingen and France led in 1873 to the formation of Chancel, Veillon, Alioth & Co., based in Basel. Its liquidation, brought about by a crisis, gave rise to the Industriegesellschaft für Schappe in 1881.

After a heyday in the 1920s and a brief boom during and after World War II, the company went into decline with the switch to man-made fibers. In the 1960s the holding company Schappe AG, founded in 1961, had to give up production in Basel, at Angenstein and in France, and in 1972 also in Grellingen. In 1967 the firm was sold to the American company Burlington, which continued to operate the Arlesheim mill as Burlington Schappe AG until its closure in 1977.

== Bibliography ==
- F. Mangold, H.F. Sarasin, Industriegesellschaft für Schappe, 1924
- A.C. Fridrich, R. Grieder, Die erste Fabrik im Baselbiet, 1993
