= David Werdmüller =

Swiss textile entrepreneur (1548–1612)

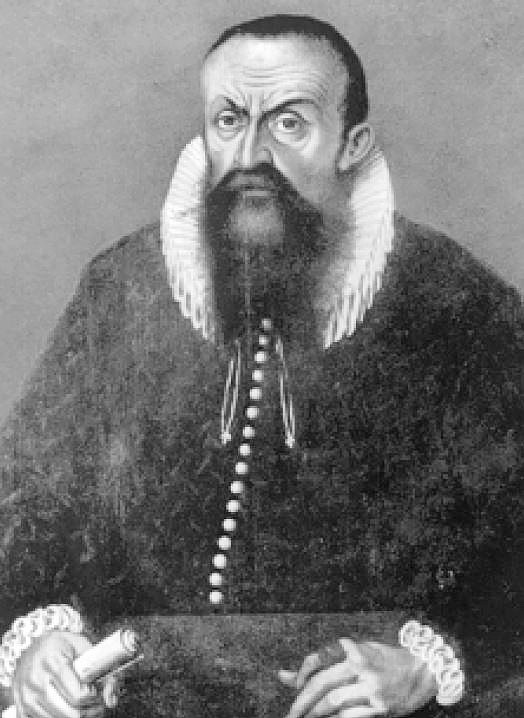
- Werdmüller in Zurich Switzerland
- Born: 1548; Zurich, Switzerland
- Died: February 9, 1612 (aged 63–64); Zurich
- Occupation: Textile entrepreneur
- Known for: Built one of the biggest textile companies in Zurich with his brother

David Werdmüller (1548 – 9 February 1612) was a Swiss textile entrepreneur from Zürich. With his brother Heinrich, he built up one of the most important export-oriented textile firms in Zürich, the first to work silk, wool, and cotton in a single establishment.

== Early life ==
Werdmüller was the son of Beat, a miller, and of Elisabeth Knäpplin, and a nephew of Otto Werdmüller. He married three times: first Emerentia Rahn, daughter of Rudolf, a member of the Small Council; second, in 1583, Regula Ramsauer, daughter of Heinrich of Schaffhausen, bailiff of Rüdlingen; and third, in 1603, Elisabeth Wyss. He probably received his commercial training with the cloth merchant Heinrich Holzhalb. From 1601 he represented the Saffron guild in the Grand Council and was also a member of the noble society of the Schildner zum Schneggen.

== Career ==
Werdmüller acquired the Schipf estate at Herrliberg in 1582. In 1587, together with his brother Heinrich Werdmüller and with the collaboration of the refugees Johann Jakob Dunus and François Turrettini, he founded a company to produce cloth, schappe yarn, and floret silk. He had the Seidenhof built in 1592, bought the silk mill of the Schipfe in 1594, and built the Wollenhof there, a cloth works that he managed alone. Using the Verlag system, the Werdmüller brothers set up an enterprise to produce for export, which quickly became one of the most important in Zürich. They were the first to work silk, wool, and cotton in a single establishment.

== Bibliography ==
- U. Pfister, Die Zürcher Fabriques, 1992, 50–51, 53, 155–156
- GKZ, 2, 131–132
- S. G. Schmid, David Werdmüller (1548–1612), Heinrich Werdmüller (1554–1627), 2001, 15, 24–32
- MAH ZH, 4, 2005, 411–413
