= Jean-Claude Zehnder =

Swiss organist and musicologist

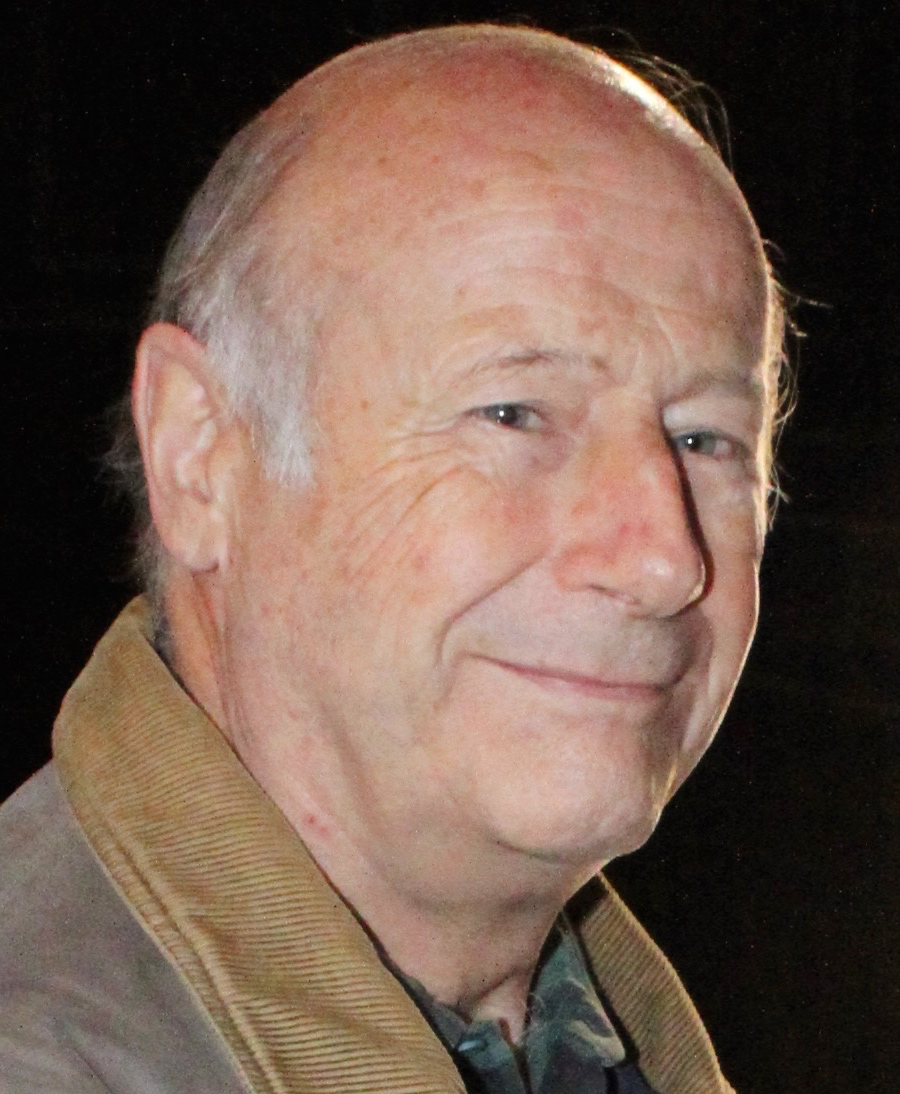
- Zehnder in 2014
- Born: 1941 (age 84–85); Winterthur, Switzerland
- Education: Winterthur Conservatory; University of Zurich; Musikakademie Wien
- Occupations: Organist; Harpsichordist; Musicologist
- Organizations: Schola Cantorum Basiliensis; Dom zu Arlesheim
- Awards: Honorary doctorate from the Technische Universität Dortmund

Jean-Claude Zehnder (born 1941) is a Swiss organist in church and concert, harpsichordist, and musicologist. In research and playing, he is focused on Baroque music, and has played and recorded at historic organs in Europe. He led the department for organ at the Schola Cantorum Basiliensis from 1972 to 2006. His publications include books and music editions, such as organ works by Johann Sebastian Bach.

== Career ==
Born in Winterthur, Zehnder studied at the conservatory of his hometown, at the University of Zurich, at the Musikakademie Wien with Anton Heiller, and in Amsterdam with Gustav Leonhardt. He was from 1966 church musician (organist and choral conductor) at the Protestant church in Frauenfeld, and taught organ and harpsichord at the Konservatorium Winterthur. He directed the organ class of the Schola Cantorum Basiliensis from 1972 to 2006. He is the organist of the Silbermann organ at the Dom zu Arlesheim.

His publications focus on topics such as the early works by Johann Sebastian Bach, which won him an honorary doctorate from the Technische Universität Dortmund in 2002. He has worked internationally as a concert organist, lecturer of masterclasses and juror in organ competitions. He has lectured at the Sommerakademie für alte Musik in Innsbruck and has cofounded organ weeks in Arlesheim and Muri.

His students include Benjamin Alard, Jörg-Andreas Bötticher, Andrés Cea Galán, Michael Eberth, Lorenzo Ghielmi, Rudolf Lutz, Andrea Marcon, Markus Märkl, Felix Pachlatko and Peter Waldner.

=== Publications ===
Zehnder published books, articles for journals, and editions of music. He participated in a new edition of Bach's organ works by Breitkopf, based on his particular interest in the development of Bach's writing for the organ.

- Die Silbermannorgel im Dom zu Arlesheim. With photos by Franz-Josef Stiele-Werdermann. Reihe Kleine Kunstführer No. 2638. Schnell und Steiner, Regensburg 2007, ISBN 978-3-7954-6636-7.
- Die frühen Werke Johann Sebastian Bachs – Stil, Chronologie, Satztechnik. (2 vol.) Teilband A: Werkbetrachtungen. Teilband B: Stilmerkmale und weitere chronologische Indizien. Schwabe, Basel 2009
- Giuseppe Torelli und Johann Sebastian Bach. Zu Bachs Weimarer Konzertform. In: Bach-Jahrbuch 77, 1991, p. 33–95.
- "Une délicatesse de la main" – Zur lautenartigen Spielweise auf Tasteninstrumenten. In: Pio Pellizzari: Musicus Perfectus. Studi in onore di Luigi Ferdinando Tagliavini. Pàtron, Bologna 1995. p. 115–135.
- Zum späten Weimarer Stil Johann Sebastian Bachs. In Martin Geck (ed.): Bachs Orchesterwerke – Bericht über das 1. Dortmunder Bach-Symposion 1996. Klangfarben-Musikverlag, Witten 1997, ISBN 3-932676-04-1. p. 89–124.
- J. A. L. – Ein Organist um Umkreis des jungen Bach. In: Basler Jahrbuch für historische Musikpraxis 22. Amadeus, Winterthur 1999. p. 127–155.
- Carl Philipp Emanuel Bach: Sechs Sonaten mit veränderten Reprisen für Clavier (1760). Amadeus, Winterthur 1976.
- Johann Pachelbel: Acht Choräle zum Präambulieren. Amadeus, Winterthur 1992.
- Aus dem Umkreis des jungen Johann Sebastian Bach. Neunzehn Orgelchoräle von Johann Sebastian Bach und dem Thüringer Umkreis aus Handschrift Yale LM 4843. (ed. with Peter Wollny.) Carus, Stuttgart 1998
- Johann Sebastian Bach: Sämtliche Orgelwerke, Band 4: Toccaten und Fugen, Einzelwerke. Breitkopf & Härtel, Wiesbaden 2012
- Johann Sebastian Bach: Sämtliche Orgelwerke, Band 8: Orgelchoräle der Leipziger Handschrift ("Achtzehn Choräle") = Organ chorales of the Leipzig manuscript ("Great eighteen chorales"), Breitkopf & Härtel, Wiesbaden 2015

== Recordings ==
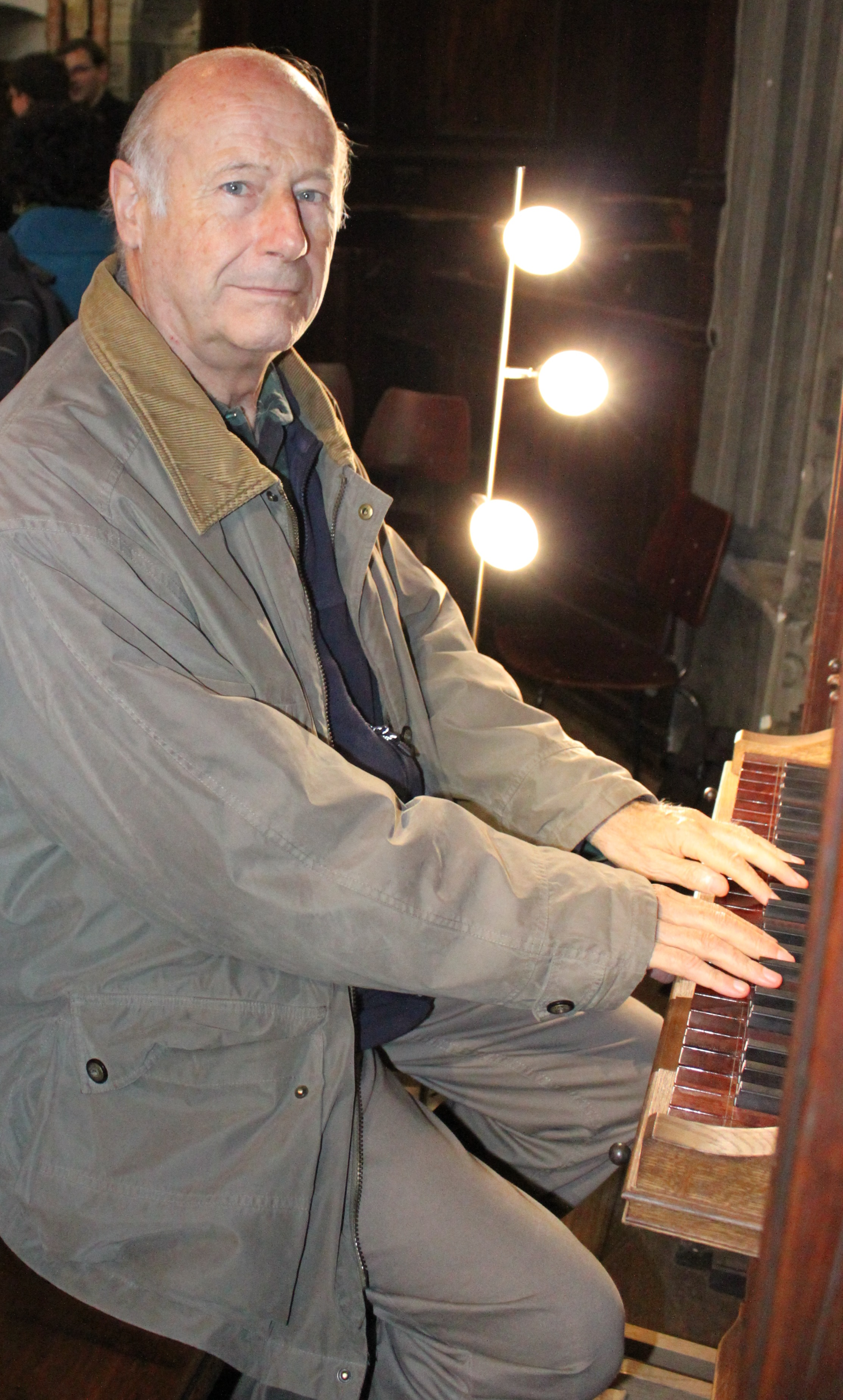
Zehnder in 2014

Zehnder's recordings include Bachs Orgelbüchlein and his Great Eighteen Chorale Preludes (Die achtzehn Leipziger Choräle). He played organs such as the Hildebrandt organ of St. Wenzel in Naumburg, the Schnitger organ at St. Jacobi in Hamburg and the Ahrend organ in San Simpliciano in Milan. His recordings are held by the German National Library.

- J. S. Bach: Die achtzehn Leipziger Choräle, with Klosterchor Wettingen, conducted by Egon Schwarb. (2 CDs.) Harmonia Mundi, 1993.
- J. S. Bach: Orgelwerke, Vol. 4, at the Ahrend organ in San Simpliciano Mailand. Deutsche Harmonia Mundi, 1993.
- J. S. Bach: Orgelbüchlein. Choralvorspiele, freie Orgelwerke und Vokalsätze. at the Silbermann organ of the Dom zu Arlesheim, with Klosterchor Wettingen, conducted by Egon Schwarb. (3 CDs) Motette-Ursina, Düsseldorf 1994/1996. (Advent und Weihnacht / Neujahr bis Passion / Ostern und Pfingsten.)
- Die Orgel in der Naumburger Wenzelskirche. Motette-Ursina, Düsseldorf 1996.
- Ponte in Valtellina. Porträt einer Renaissance-Orgel. Motette-Ursina, Düsseldorf 2006.
- Bach in Naumburg. Motette-Ursina, Düsseldorf 2004.
- Bachs früheste Notenhandschriften – Die Weimarer Orgeltabulatur. Carus, Stuttgart 2006.
