= Mombourquette =

Mombourquette is a surname. Notable people with the surname include:

- Derek Mombourquette (born 1980), Canadian politician from Nova Scotia
- Donna Mombourquette, American politician from New Hampshire
- Joseph Mombourquette (1922–2007), Canadian veteran and politician from New Brunswick

== See also ==
- Bourette
