= Progressive conservatism =

Political ideology combining progressive and conservative policies

Progressive conservatism (i.e. conservative progressivism) is a syncretic political ideology that combines conservative and progressive policies. While still supportive of a market economy, it stresses the importance of government intervention to contribute to the common good.

Progressive conservatism first arose in Germany and the United Kingdom in the 1870s and 1880s under Chancellor Otto von Bismarck and Prime Minister Benjamin Disraeli respectively. Disraeli's 'One Nation' Toryism has since become the central progressive conservative tradition in the UK.

In the UK, the prime ministers Disraeli, Stanley Baldwin, Neville Chamberlain, Winston Churchill, Harold Macmillan, David Cameron and Theresa May have been described as progressive conservatives. The Catholic Church's Rerum Novarum (1891) is said to advocate a progressive conservative doctrine known as social Catholicism.

In the United States, Theodore Roosevelt has been the principal figure identified with progressive conservatism as a political tradition. Roosevelt regarded the Republican Party under Abraham Lincoln as having been a progressive conservative party, declaring in 1908 that his business had been to "take hold of the conservative party and turn it into what it had been under Lincoln, that is, a party of progressive conservatism, or conservative radicalism; for of course wise radicalism and wise conservatism go hand in hand."

Roosevelt's successor William Howard Taft has also been associated with progressive conservatism, together with later presidents Dwight David Eisenhower and Richard Nixon.

After World War II, Germany adopted its social market economy, establishing a regulated market economy different to classic free market economies. This economic system was implemented under the first post-war chancellor Konrad Adenauer of the Christian Democratic Union (cf. Christian democracy).

Various European leaders such as former German Chancellor Angela Merkel have also aligned themselves with progressive conservative politics. In some countries, such as South Korea, the main conservative camp may sometimes be more progressive on immigration than the centre-left camp. In Hungary, the Péter Magyar-led government has advocated for improving minority rights, such as for Romani people and LGBTQ rights, while still supporting patriotism. According to a poll, 71% of the TISZA voters would support improving LGBTQ rights. On 9 June 2026 he openly took a stance in supporting gay couples adopting children.

== History ==
=== Europe ===
==== Germany ====
In Germany, Chancellor Otto von Bismarck enacted various progressive social welfare programs such as domestic health, accident, and old age insurance, out of conservative motivations to distance workers from the socialist movement and as humane ways to assist in maintaining the industrial revolution.

In the early 20th century, politicians of the Free Conservative Party addressed means of attracting the working class away from social democracy and towards radical nationalism such as through promoting "patriotic worker" associations. Free Conservative Party member Adolf Grabowsky advocated imperialism as a national project to unify Germans and break down internal divisions, and declared that the Free Conservative Party "finally wants to organize itself in a decisive progressive-conservative manner, and hopes thereby to call forth the great new conservative movement which should enable the educated strata to drive once again to the right".

In 1918, when the party was dissolved, moderate Free Conservatives joined the German People's Party (DVP), which was itself later dissolved in 1933 following Adolf Hitler's rise to power. After the Second World War, most members of the German People's Party joined the modern Free Democratic Party.

==== United Kingdom ====
From the 1860s to the 1970s, progressive conservative politics were popular within the British Conservative Party. Winston Churchill considered himself a progressive conservative, and once said that a "strong Conservative Party with an overwhelming majority and a moderate even progressive leadership...might well be the fulfillment of all that Dizzy [Disraeli] and my father aimed at". Progressive conservatives succeeded in pressing the Conservative Party to maintain similar social policies to that of the Labour Party, particularly the Bow Group that urged the Conservatives to be moderate on social policy and opposed more extreme conservative-minded bodies that disagreed with this moderation. One of the primary British progressive conservative advocates in this time was Rab Butler. Butler was responsible for creating The Industrial Charter (1947) that sought to combine support of free enterprise with Tory interventionism that promised security of employment, promotion of full employment, and improvement of incentives to employees to help them develop skills and talents - allowing them to fulfill their full potential as individuals, and enhanced status for all employees regardless of their occupation. The Industrial Charter was criticized by Conservative leader Winston Churchill though he eventually supported it, and more harshly condemned by more right-leaning Conservatives as being a step towards socialism.

Former British prime minister David Cameron was described as a progressive conservative. As British Conservative Party leader in 2009, he launched the Progressive Conservatism Project at the British think tank Demos. In his speech, he outlined his vision of a contemporary progressive conservatism:

First, a society that is fair, where we help people out of poverty and help them stay out of it – for life. Second, a society where opportunity is equal where everyone can, in Michael Gove’s brilliant phrase, “write their own life-story”. Third, a society that is greener, where we pass on a planet that is environmentally sustainable, clean and beautiful to future generations. And fourth, a safer society, where people are protected from threat and fear.

— David Cameron

Cameron's political ideology arguably inspired the creation of the progressive conservative think tank Bright Blue in 2014.

=== North America ===
==== Canada ====
A variety of Canadian conservative governments have been progressive conservative, with Canada's major conservative party being officially named the Progressive Conservative Party of Canada from 1942 to 2003. Canadian prime ministers Arthur Meighen, R.B. Bennett, John Diefenbaker, Joe Clark, Brian Mulroney, and Kim Campbell led progressive conservative, 'Red Tory' governments.

The Progressive Conservative Party merged with the Canadian Alliance in 2003 to form the Conservative Party. However, many of Canada's provinces still have 'Progressive Conservative' parties that continued using the Progressive Conservative name after the 2003 merger:

- The Progressive Conservative Party of Manitoba (in opposition)
- The Progressive Conservative Party of New Brunswick (in opposition)
- The Progressive Conservative Party of Newfoundland and Labrador (in government)
- The Progressive Conservative Association of Nova Scotia (in government)
- The Progressive Conservative Party of Ontario (in government)
- The Progressive Conservative Party of Prince Edward Island (in government)
- The Progressive Conservative Party of Saskatchewan (in extraparliamentary opposition)

The Progressive Conservative Association of Alberta operated as a political party until 2017 before merging into the United Conservative Party. In 2025 the Alberta Party, a centrist party with one legislator in parliamentary opposition, renamed itself the Progressive Tory Party of Alberta, describing itself as a progressive conservative party.

==== United States ====
In the United States, the Republican Party has historically included progressive conservative factions. At the beginning of the 20th century, progressive conservatives in the GOP included figures such as Theodore Roosevelt and William Howard Taft. As president, Roosevelt formulated the Square Deal, a domestic program which focused on breaking up monopolies, protecting consumers, and conserving the environment. When Taft assumed the presidency in 1909 after Roosevelt stepped down, he pledged to continue Roosevelt's policies, but was soon criticised by Roosevelt and the rest of the Republican Party's progressive wing for reducing tariffs and for the Pinchot-Ballinger affair. Taft was nominated as the Republican Party's presidential nominee at the 1912 Republican National Convention despite hard-fought efforts from Roosevelt to prevent this - this led Roosevelt and other progressives to split from the Republican Party and create the Progressive Party, which entered the 1912 US presidential election with the aim of denying Taft a second term. Both Taft and Roosevelt were defeated by Democratic nominee Woodrow Wilson, and the Progressive Party was dissolved in 1920.

Between the 1930s and 1970s, the Rockefeller Republicans were very influential in the GOP - they held moderate to conservative views on economics, while also holding liberal or progressive positions on social issues. They supported a modest social safety net and were in favor of continuing some of the New Deal programs introduced by Franklin D. Roosevelt. They supported big business but tolerated some economic regulation and were in favor of public-private partnerships. As a faction, the Rockefeller Republicans started declining after the nomination of Barry Goldwater for president in 1964, and by the end of the presidency of George H.W. Bush, they had become an endangered minority in the party. However, socially progressive Republicans continue to win local and state elections in the Northeastern United States, and have occasionally been referred to by the media as 'Rockefeller-style' Republicans, but this trend was largely absent from the 2022 United States gubernatorial elections, where Democratic candidates won the governorships against right-wing Republicans in Maryland and Massachusetts, both of which had moderate Republican incumbents, along with the rightward shift of the party in general.

The Democratic Party has also historically included some progressive conservatives, and like their Republican counterparts, they too have become a minority in their party. In the 1930s, Southern Democrats (who made up the majority of the Democratic Party's voter base at the time) supported Franklin D. Roosevelt's economically progressive New Deal programs while remaining socially conservative on topics such as segregation. Many of these Southern Democrats later switched to the Republican Party. Some Conservative Democrats from the South opposed the New Deal and formed the Conservative Coalition, an alliance of the conservative wings of both major parties - this alliance lasted until 1994. The Blue Dog Coalition of the Democratic Party is considered the main successor to the Conservative Coalition. Founded in 1995, the Blue Dog Democrats initially continued promoting the socially conservative policies of its predecessor - today, however, the Blue Dogs promote a mixture of social progressivism and moderate fiscal conservatism, and are generally considered centrist.

John Bel Edwards synthesized "progressive views on economics and his commitment to a strong social safety net" with moderate to conservative social views as governor of Louisiana, a traditionally conservative state.

Jared Golden, the U.S. representative for Maine's 2nd congressional district from 2019 until 2027, has described his political philosophy as "progressive conservatism".

== See also ==
- Bright Blue
- Christian democracy
- Conservative liberalism
- Green conservatism
- Compassionate conservatism
- Konrad Adenauer Foundation
- Liberal conservatism
- Neoclassical liberalism
- One-nation conservatism
- Paternalistic conservatism
- Progressive Conservative Party of Canada
- Radical centrism
- Red Tory
- Social market economy
- Third Way
- Tory Reform Group
- Bull Moose Party
- People's Action Party
