= Ludwig Rudolf Alioth =

Swiss industrialist (1848–1916)

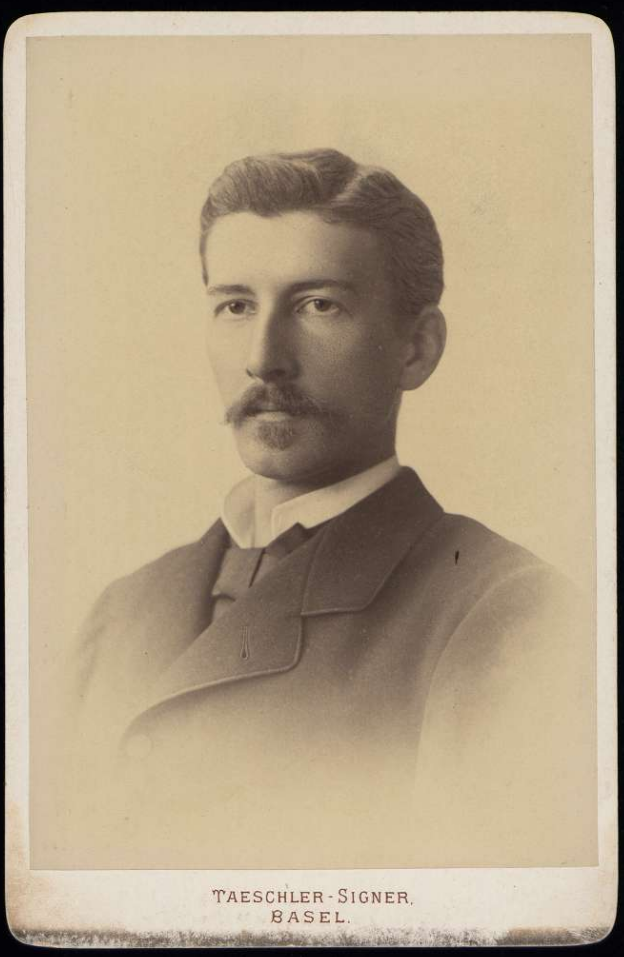
- Born: 5 May 1848; Arlesheim, Switzerland
- Died: 1 July 1916 (aged 68); Arlesheim, Switzerland
- Occupations: Engineer; industrialist
- Spouse: Bertha von Speyr
- Children: Elisabeth Vischer-Alioth
- Father: Daniel August Alioth

Ludwig Rudolf Alioth (5 May 1848 – 1 July 1916) was a Swiss engineer and industrialist. In 1881 he and Emil Bürgin founded an electrical manufacturing business, from which the Elektrizitätsgesellschaft Alioth in Münchenstein emerged in 1895; in 1911 the firm merged with BBC. He was a pioneer of the Swiss electrical industry, and above all of electric railways.

== Biography ==
Ludwig Rudolf Alioth was born on 5 May 1848 in Arlesheim, the son of Daniel August Alioth. He married Bertha von Speyr, daughter of Karl von Speyr. He studied in Lausanne and spent a period of study in the United States. His daughter was the suffragist Elisabeth Vischer-Alioth.

Alioth was an engineer. He was first technical director and partner in his father's schappe spinning mill. In 1881, together with Emil Bürgin, he founded an electrical manufacturing business, first in Basel and then in Münchenstein, which produced motors, apparatus and locomotives. In 1895 it gave rise to the Elektrizitätsgesellschaft Alioth AG in Münchenstein. In 1911 the firm merged with Brown, Boveri & Cie (BBC).

Alioth was a pioneer of the Swiss electrical industry, and above all of electric railways. In 1903 the University of Lausanne awarded him an honorary doctorate. He was a colonel in the engineer troops (Genietruppen). He died in Arlesheim on 1 July 1916.

== Bibliography ==
- F. Mangold, Basler Wirtschaftsführer, 1933, 107–110
