= Matka (silk) =

Type of coarse silk

Matka cloth was a kind of coarse silk from the Indian subcontinent. It was mainly produced with pierced cocoons. A pierced cocoon is one from which the moth of the silkworm has emerged and damaged the cocoon. The silk from these cocoons is spun, not reeled. The fabric made from these yarns is known as "Matka cloth."

== Matka weaving ==
Matka cloth provided employment for poor women and less artistic weavers. Matka was a silk for poor people and religious people, like the Jains, who preferred Matka silk. This is because it doesn't kill the insect to get the silk. The local method of weaving in the Bengal region was termed "Matka." The weavers of Matka lived in and around Dakra.

Matka cloth produced by Rajshahi's weavers was of great repute and used to be in demand. A local Matka cloth named "Dakra Matka" was of such high quality that it was comparable to reeled silk. Weavers occasionally combine Matka silk with another type of silk called "Khamru" to create a more superior Matka cloth.

== See also ==
- Sericulture
- Silk waste
- Ahimsa silk
