= Adolf Grabowsky =

German political scientist

Adolf Grabowsky (August 31, 1880 in Berlin – August 23, 1969 in Arlesheim, Switzerland) was a German political scientist and author of several books about geopolitics and political theory, including "Democracy and Dictatorship" (1949). He was a Jewish convert to Protestantism, and founder and editor of the Zeitschrift für Politik. He was a supporter of the Weimar democracy.

== Bibliography ==
- Murphy, David Thomas (1997). The heroic earth: geopolitical thought in Weimar Germany, 1918-1933. Kent State University Press. ISBN 0-87338-564-0.
- Pulzer, Peter G. J. (2003). Jews and the German state: the political history of a minority, 1848-1933. Jewish studies. Wayne State University Press. ISBN 0-8143-3130-0.
- Thierbach, Hans (1963). Adolf Grabowsky, Leben und Werk (in German). Carl Heymanns Verlag.
