= Johann Siegmund Alioth =

Swiss industrialist (1788–1850)

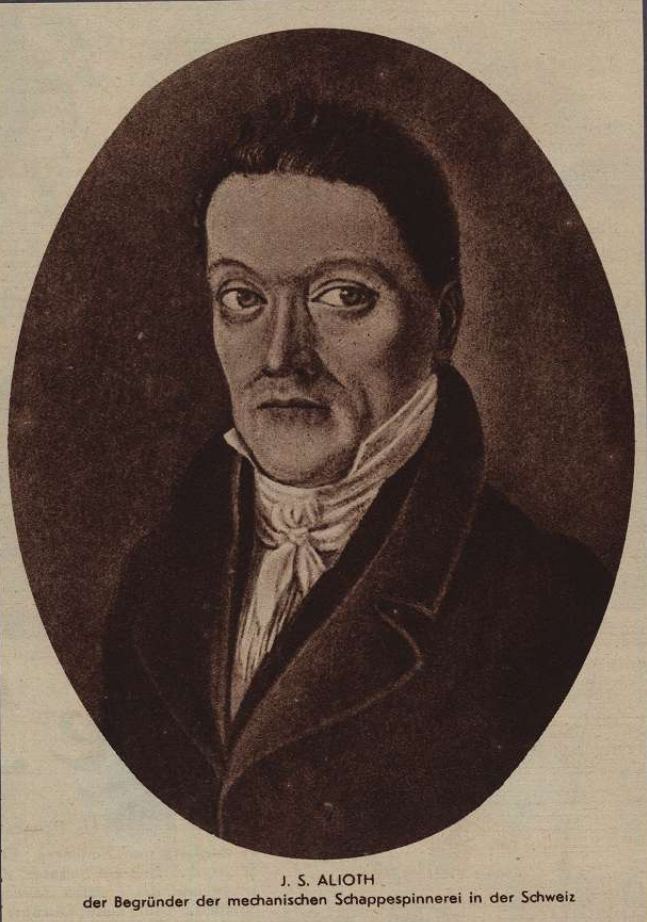
- Born: 2 November 1788; Biel
- Died: 5 May 1850 (aged 61); Basel, Switzerland
- Occupations: Merchant; manufacturer
- Spouse: Chrischona Hornung (m. 1813)
- Children: Daniel August Alioth
- Father: Claudius Alioth

Johann Siegmund Alioth (2 November 1788 – 5 May 1850) was a Swiss merchant and manufacturer. In 1824 he founded the first schappe (spun silk) spinning mill in Switzerland in Basel, and with the industrial processing of silk waste he opened up for Basel a branch of business that quickly gained in importance. In 1830 he moved his business to Arlesheim.

== Biography ==
Johann Siegmund Alioth was born on 2 November 1788 in Biel, the son of Claudius Alioth. In 1813 he married Chrischona Hornung, from Mulhouse. His son was Daniel August Alioth, who was born in Guebwiller in 1816.

From 1802 to 1808 Alioth trained as a merchant in Basel. He was a merchant and manufacturer in Alsace, in Strasbourg, Guebwiller and Mulhouse. In 1824 he founded the first schappe spinning mill in Switzerland in Basel. With the industrial processing of silk waste, he opened up for Basel a branch of business that quickly gained in importance. In 1830 he moved his business to Arlesheim. He died in Basel on 5 May 1850.

== Bibliography ==
- F. Mangold and H. F. Sarasin, Industrie-Gesellschaft für Schappe, 1924
