= Heinrich Werdmüller =

Swiss textile entrepreneur (1554–1627)

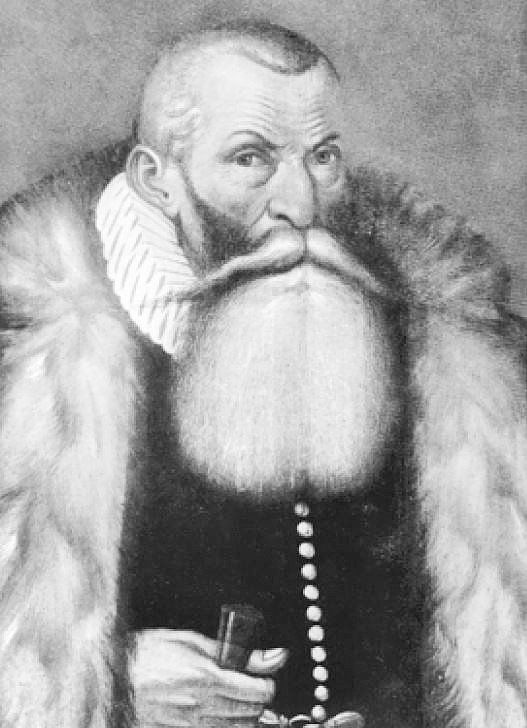
- Werdmüller in Zurich Switzerland
- Born: 1554; Zurich, Switzerland
- Died: June 20, 1627 (aged 72–73); Zurich
- Occupation: Textile entrepreneur
- Known for: Built one of the biggest textile companies in Zurich with his brother

Heinrich Werdmüller (1554 – 20 June 1627) was a Swiss textile entrepreneur from Zürich. With his brother David, he founded one of Zürich's first industrial textile firms, of which he handled the management and finances.

== Early years ==
Werdmüller was the son of Beat, a miller, and of Elisabeth Knäpplin. In 1576 he married Ursula Kitt, daughter of Sebastian, a master ropemaker. He received his commercial training with Hans Heinrich Wüest and entered the Grand Council in 1586 as a representative of the Saffron guild.

== Career ==
In 1587, together with his brother David and the Reformed refugees Johann Jakob Dunus and François Turrettini, Werdmüller founded a company to establish an industrial textile enterprise. He took its direction and handled the financial management. His account book, covering the years 1598 to 1608, is the first example in Zürich of accounts kept entirely in double-entry bookkeeping. On David's death in 1612, the joint silk enterprise was dissolved and its assets divided; Werdmüller took over the Neuer Seidenhof, built in 1606–1607, and the adjoining factories.

== Bibliography ==
- S. G. Schmid, David Werdmüller (1548–1612), Heinrich Werdmüller (1554–1627), 2001, 15–16, 24–25, 39–40, 42–45
- MAH ZH, 4, 2005, 411–412, 419
