= Birseck Castle =

Castle in Arlesheim, Switzerland

- Ruine or Schloss Birseck
- Arlesheim
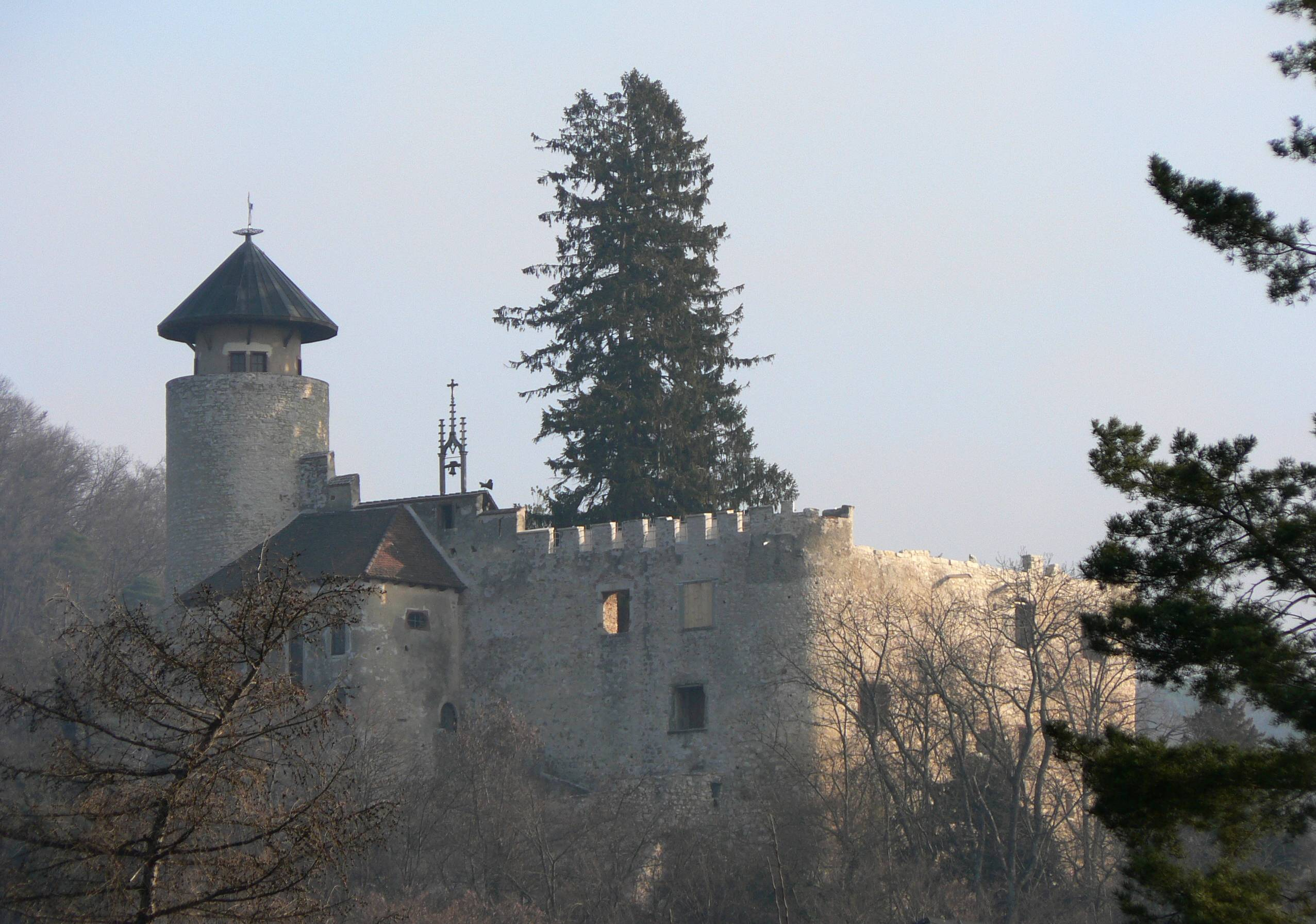
- Ruins of Birseck Castle

Site information
- Type: hill castle
- Code: CH-BL
- Condition: ruin

Location
- Coordinates: 47°29′31″N 7°37′43″E

Site history
- Built: 1243/44

Garrison information
- Occupants: counts

Birseck Castle (German: Burg Birseck) is located in the municipality of Arlesheim in the canton of Basel-Country. Birseck Castle is also called "Untere Burg Birseck" or "Vordere Burg Birseck" and is one of four castles on a slope called Birseck that confines the plain of the Birs river. The Eremitage building group that includes the castle is listed as a heritage site of national significance. Burg Reichenstein is the sister castle to Birseck and sits on a higher slope to the north.

== History ==
It is likely that a fortification existed on the site of the current castle as early as the 12th century. However, there is no reliable evidence of this. The history of the present-day castle began when the Counts of Froburg [German] sought to expand their possessions in the southern Sisgau [German] region from the mid-12th century onward. As a countermeasure, Bishop Lütold von Rötteln [German] of Basel purchased a hill near the Niedermünster monastery in 1239 to build a fortress. By order of the bishop, the stone fortifications of Birseck Castle were erected as early as 1243–1244. During investigations of the masonry in the oldest preserved sections of the fortress, clear traces of a severe fire were discovered. From this, it can be concluded that Birseck Castle was built on the site of a former stone structure, reusing the remaining stones. The cause of the fire remains unknown.

In 1245, Ludwig von Froburg relinquished his claims to the lands around Birseck Castle, as well as territories near the neighboring Reichenstein Castle. From the late 13th century onward, Birseck served as a residence for bishops. In 1270, during the tenure of Bishop Heinrich von Neuenburg [German], even the Roman Pope visited the castle.

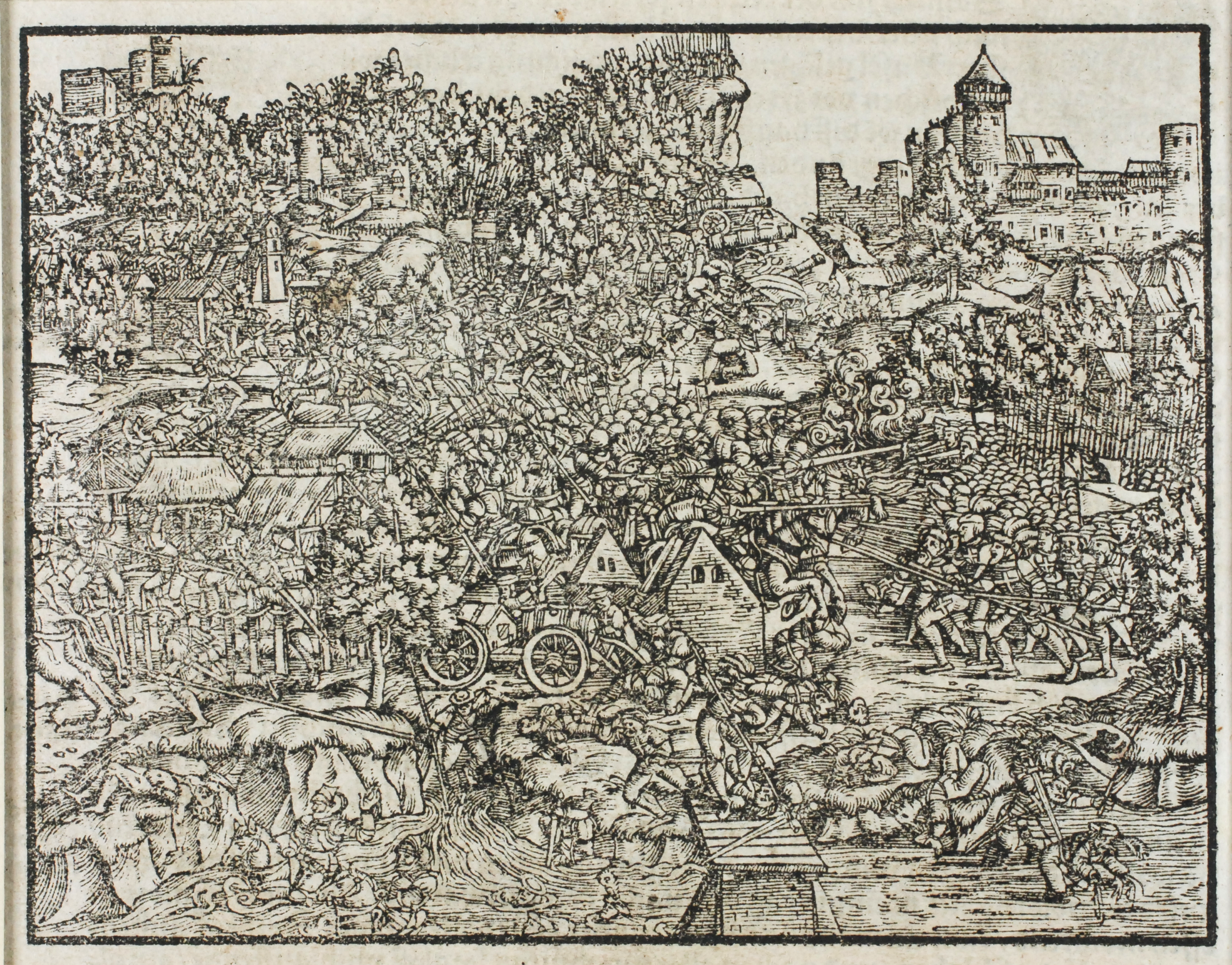
Zentralbibliothek Solothurn - Schlacht bei Dorneck - a0491

During the Basel earthquake of 1356, the castle suffered significant damage. It is possible that the deep cracks observed in the masonry originated from this event. Evidence also suggests that a major fire around the same period caused considerable harm to the castle. As the military importance of the fortress declined and the bishops lacked funds for its upkeep, Birseck was transferred to the knights of the von Ramstein family in 1373.
