= Wilhelm Pelikan =

German-Austrian scientist (1893–1981)

- Born: December 3, 1893 Pola, Croatia
- Died: December 3, 1982 (aged 89) Arlesheim, Switzerland
- Citizenship: German
- Occupation(s): Chemist, anthroposophist

Wilhelm Pelikan (3 December 1893, Pola, Croatia – 17 November 1982, Arlesheim, Switzerland) was a German-Austrian chemist and anthroposophist.

== Early life and education ==
Wilhelm Pelikan was born to a German-Austrian father and a Dalmatian mother. He spent his early childhood in Galicia.

According to the International Association of Anthroposophic Pharmacists, Wilhelm Pelikan studied chemistry in Vienna and Graz. He was called up for military service in 1916, but was discharged shortly after due to lung and cardiac problems.

During his illness, Pelikan was introduced to anthroposophy through the work of Rudolf Steiner and his book Knowledge of the Higher Worlds. In 1918, he attended one of Steiner's lectures in Vienna. He subsequently became Steiner’s student, and later became involved in anthroposophical work.

== Career and contributions ==
Pelikan initially worked in Vienna's gold and silver refinery before being invited by Eugen Kolisko in 1919 to join the research institute Der Kommende Tag in Stuttgart. At the institute, he engaged in anthroposophical research, contributed to academic lectures, and presented at the East-West Congress in Vienna. In 1922, he began working in the newly established laboratories of the Institute of Clinical Medicine in Stuttgart, focusing on the preparation of metal mirrors.

Following the dissolution of Der Kommende Tag in 1924, Pelikan became the head of Weleda in Schwäbisch Gmünd and remained in the position for 40 years. During his tenure, Weleda developed a range of anthroposophical medicines.

== Development of medical gardens ==
Together with biodynamic gardening expert Franz Lippert, Pelikan established a medicinal herb garden on Weleda's grounds and later expanded it to Wetzgau, cultivating over 200 species of medicinal plants. These were later integrated into Weleda’s production of natural medicines.

== Anthroposophical Society and Weleda initiatives ==
Pelikan also fostered the Schwäbisch Gmünd branch of the Anthroposophical Society and began to allow it to hold meetings on Weleda's premises in 1935. The branch was later named the Raphael Branch.

In 1948, he joined the editorial team of Weleda Korrespondenzblätter für Ärzte and organized several conferences for medical professionals, pharmacists, and others in related fields. He also conducted Goethean studies on metals and medicinal plants, framed within anthroposophical perspectives.

== Later years and research ==
After retiring in 1963, Pelikan continued his research while receiving support from Christa Krueger-Woernle. In 1965, he and his wife relocated to Arlesheim, where he worked with the Science Section of the Goetheanum and continued working with the Anthroposophical Society. Pelikan also explored topics in astronomy, published a study on Halley's Comet, and collaborated with mathematician Georg Unger on plant growth statistics, releasing a scientific paper in 1965.

Pelikan's work was influenced by earlier anthroposophical botanists such as Gerbert Grohmann, whose volume The Plant presents the anthroposophical view of plant nature.

== Works ==
- The Secrets of Metals, Lindisfarne Books, Revised edition (2006), ISBN 158420043X
- Healing Plants: Insights through Spiritual Science, Mercury Press (1997), ISBN 0929979648
- Healing Plants volume 2, Mercury Press (2012), ISBN 1935136046

In German

- Der Halley'sche Komet: Vom Geistig-Wesenhaften der Kometen-Natur, Philosophisch-Anthroposophischer Verlag am Goetheanum, (1985).
