= Reichenstein Castle (Arlesheim) =

Castle in Arlesheim, Switzerland

- Arlesheim
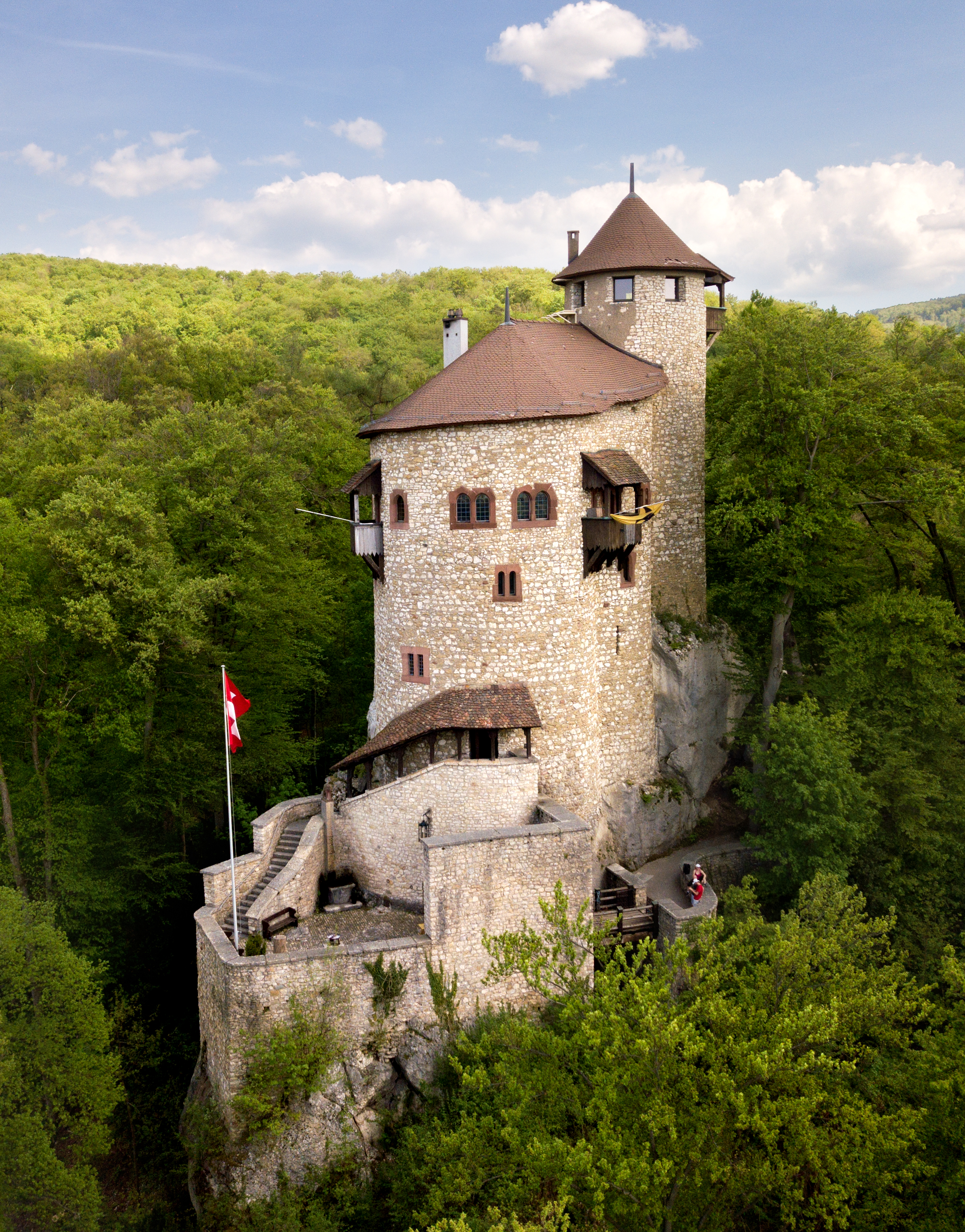
- Tower of Reichenstein castle

Site information
- Type: hill castle
- Code: CH-BL
- Condition: preserved

Location
- Coordinates: 47°29′48.50″N 7°37′44.61″E
- Height: 460 m

Site history
- Built: 1239 (first mention)

Reichenstein Castle (German: Burg Reichenstein) is a castle in the municipality of Arlesheim in the canton of Basel-Land in Switzerland. It is a Swiss heritage site of national significance.

It is one of four castles on a slope called Birseck that confines the plain of the Birs river and is the sister castle to Birseck Castle.

1245-1813 the castle was a property of the Swiss noble family Reich von Reichenstein. This family also holds the Château de Landskron (France) and Inzlingen Castle (Germany).

== See also ==
- List of castles in Switzerland
