= Felix Pachlatko =

Swiss organist

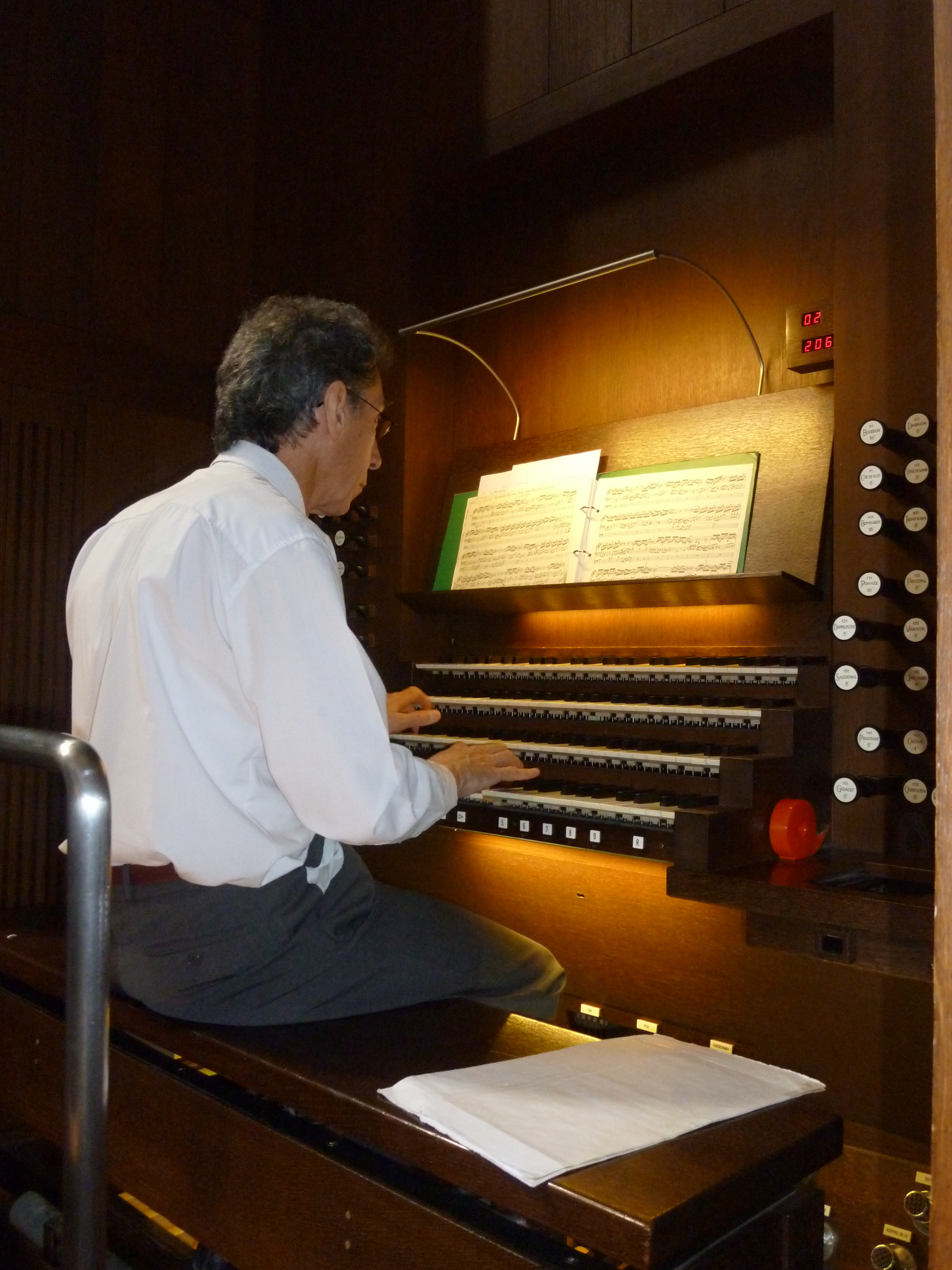
Felix Pachlatko

Felix Pachlatko (born 1950 in Zürich) is a Swiss organist.

== Career ==
Pachlatko studied in Basel with Eduard Müller. After his soloist diploma, he completed his education with Anton Heiller and Jean-Claude Zehnder. After a first employment at the Tituskirche, he was appointed organist at the Basel Minster in 1982. He held this position until December 2013. Pachlatko taught as a lecturer at the City of Basel Music Academy.
