= Emil Bürgin =

Swiss electrical engineer (1848–1933)

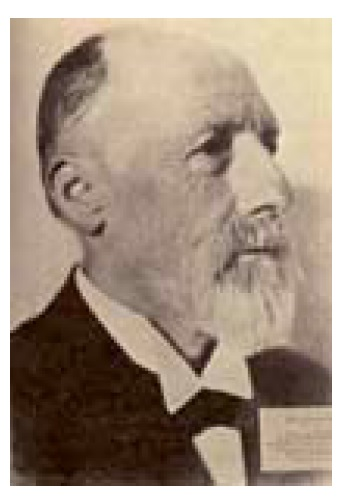
- Born: 23 August 1848; Basel, Switzerland
- Died: 15 July 1933 (aged 84); Basel, Switzerland
- Occupations: Engineer; industrialist
- Spouse: Ella Mallery Turner (m. 1877)
- Parents: Johann Jakob Bürgin (father); Elisabeth Anna Wüst (mother)

Emil Bürgin (23 August 1848 – 15 July 1933) was a Swiss engineer and industrialist from Basel. He is considered the first Swiss manufacturer of arc lamps, and he built the first dynamo in Switzerland. In 1881, together with Ludwig Rudolf Alioth, he founded the first Swiss electrotechnical workshop for the manufacture of incandescent lamps and dynamos, and in 1884 the first Swiss ice factory, both in Basel.

== Biography ==
Emil Bürgin was born on 23 August 1848 in Basel, the son of Johann Jakob Bürgin, tenant of the Birmann estate (Birmann'sches Gut) in Basel, and Elisabeth Anna née Wüst. In 1877 he married Ella Mallery Turner, an American citizen.

After attending school in Basel, Bürgin served an apprenticeship as a mechanic at the engineering works Socin & Wick and studied engineering at the Federal Polytechnic (Eidgenössisches Polytechnikum) in Zurich. In 1871–1872 he worked as a machine fitter (Maschinenschlosser) in Paris, from 1872 to 1875 as an engineer at the Swiss Locomotive and Machine Works in Winterthur, and from 1876 to 1880 for the Société Raoul Pictet & Cie. in Geneva. In 1876 and 1880 he spent time in the United States.

Bürgin is considered the first Swiss manufacturer of arc lamps, and he built the first dynamo in Switzerland. Together with Ludwig Rudolf Alioth he founded in 1881 in Basel the first Swiss electrotechnical workshop for the manufacture of incandescent lamps and dynamos. In 1884 he founded the first Swiss ice factory in Basel and introduced the production of liquid carbon dioxide. He was a lieutenant colonel of the engineer troops (Genietruppen). He died in Basel on 15 July 1933.

== Bibliography ==
- National-Zeitung, 17 July 1933
- Schweizerische Bauzeitung, 7 October 1933
