= Otto Werdmüller =

Swiss theologian (1513–1552)

- Born: 22 March 1513; Zürich, Switzerland
- Died: 25 March 1552 (aged 39); Zürich, Switzerland
- Occupations: Theologian, pastor, professor

Otto Werdmüller (22 March 1513 – 25 March 1552) was a Swiss theologian from Zürich. He taught at the academy of Zürich and served as a pastor and canon of the Grossmünster, and was the author of theological and devotional works.

== Biography ==
Werdmüller was the son of Heinrich, a member of the council, and of Regula Bluntschli, and a nephew of Jakob. In 1541 he married Magdalena Gessner, daughter of Andreas, a councillor and printer. A pupil of Oswald Myconius and Thomas Platter in Zürich, he studied at Basel, Strasbourg, and Wittenberg. He taught at Basel, Paris, and Orléans while continuing his studies (1538–1540) and was ordained in 1541.

Werdmüller was professor of ethics and physics at the academy of Zürich, then a pastor (1545) and a canon and archdeacon of the Grossmünster (1547). In addition to sermons and theological works (Houptsumma der waren Religion, 1551; Vom höchsten Artickel, 1552), he published devotional literature, including Ein Kleinot (1548), Der Tod (1549), and Das christenlich Läben (1551). He died of the plague in 1552.

== Bibliography ==
- L. Weisz, Die Werdmüller, 1, 1949, 60–72

=== Archives ===
- Zentralbibliothek Zürich, Zürich (correspondence)
- Works by Otto Werdmüller at LibriVox (public domain audiobooks)
