= Gabrielle Alioth =

Swiss writer, also resident in Ireland

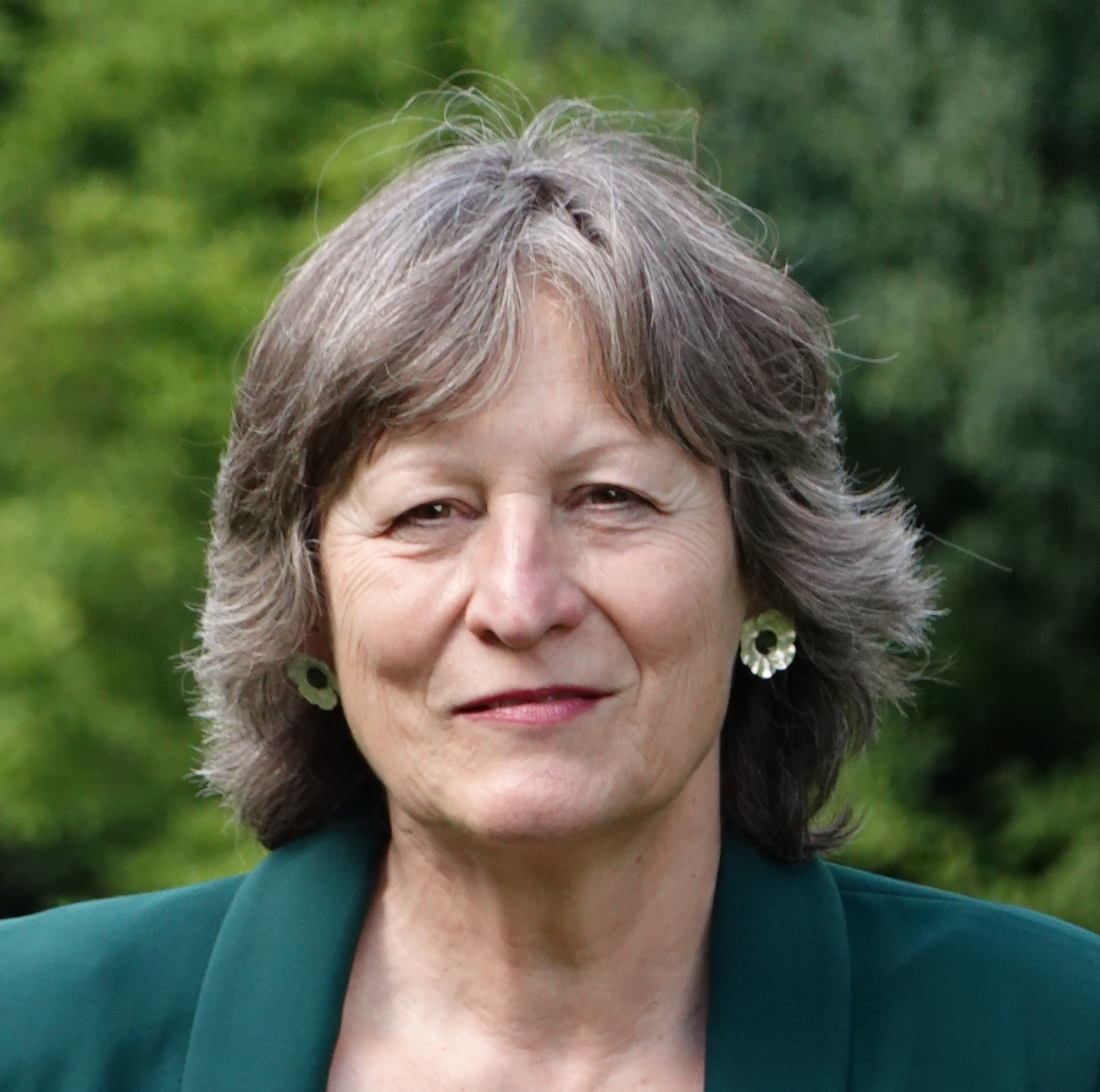
- Born: 21 April 1955 (age 70); Basel, Switzerland
- Occupation: Author

Gabrielle Alioth (born 21 April 1955) is a Swiss author of novels, short stories, children's books and travelogues, resident in Ireland since 1984.

== Biography ==
Gabrielle Alioth was born on 21 April 1955 in Basel and grew up in Riehen; she went on to study political science, economics, art history and philosophy in Basel and Salzburg Universities. In 1979 she began working in the University of Basel and as a researcher at Prognos AG in econometric forecasting and Operations Research.

Alioth moved with her husband, Martin Alioth (divorced in 2015), to Ireland in 1984, where she worked as a journalist and translator. From 1990 Alioth began working as a freelance writer. Since 2011 she lives in Termonfeckin, County Louth.

In 1991 she took part in the Ingeborg Bachmann Competition in Klagenfurt, and the same year was awarded the Mara Cassens Prize. 2012 Geertje Potash-Suhr Prose Prize. In 2020 she was awarded the Cultural Prize of Riehen. 2022 SCALG Poetry Prize. Alioth is a member of the Association of Authors of Switzerland and president of the PEN Center of German-Speaking Authors Abroad.

She has been writer-in-residence at the University of Southern California in 1997 and University College Dublin in 2005, and later on Achill Island, County Mayo, Ireland. Alioth has also been guest lecturer at the Case Western Reserve University in Cleveland in 2002 and at the University of St. Gallen in 2016, and worked as a lecturer at the Lucerne University of Applied Sciences and Arts from 2004 to 2021.

== Bibliography ==
=== Novels and stories ===
- Der Narr. Nagel & Kimche, Zürich 1990
- Wie ein kostbarer Stein. Nagel & Kimche, Zürich 1994
- Die Arche der Frauen. Nagel & Kimche Zürich 1996
- Die stumme Reiterin. Nagel & Kimche, Zürich 1998
- Das magische Licht. Nagel & Kimche, Zürich 2001
- Im Tal der Schatten. Nagel & Kimche, Zürich 2002
- Die Erfindung von Liebe und Tod. Nagel & Kimche, Zürich 2003
- Der prüfende Blick. Nagel & Kimche, Zürich 2007
- Die Braut aus Byzanz. Nagel & Kimche, Zürich 2008
- Die griechische Kaiserin. Nagel & Kimche, Zürich 2011
- Die entwendete Handschrift. Lenos, Basel 2016
- Die Frau aus Theben. Schweizerisches Jugendschriftenwerk, Zürich 2016
- Tell – mein Vater. Schweizerisches Jugendschriftenwerk, Zürich 2018
- Gallus der Fremde. Lenos, Basel 2018
- In der Bibliothek des Bären. Schweizerisches Jugendschriftenwerk, Zürich 2019
- Die Überlebenden. Lenos, Basel 2021
- Seapoint – Strand. Caracol, Warth 2022
- Die letzte Insel, Lenos, Basel 2025
- Funde Feen Fahndungen – Geschichten aus Irland, Caracol, Warth 2025

=== Poetry ===
- The Poet's Coat - The poet's coat, 2019

=== Nonfiction ===
- Shared - 24 life stories of women from Basel-Stadt and Basel-Landschaft, 2008
- Emigrants - Swiss emigrants from 7 centuries, 2014

=== Travel books ===
- Ireland. A journey through the land of the rainbow, 2003
- Ireland, with Northern Ireland. Photos by Max Schmid, 2004
- Ireland. Photos by Marco Paoluzzo, 2007
- Ireland at second glance. An island in thirty texts , 2012
- Magic Ireland. Photos by Max Schmid, Benteli, 2025

=== Plays ===
- Ärger uf de Arche, 2006
- Orpheus!
