= Arlesheim =

- Municipality
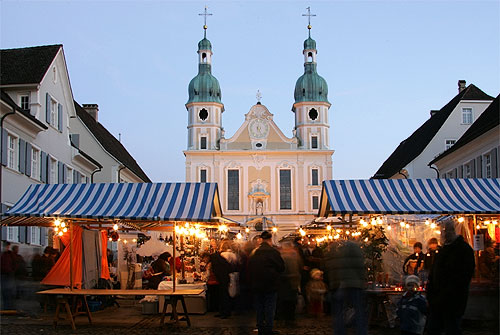
- Market on Domplatz in front of the Dom

- Coat of arms
- Location of Arlesheim
- Location within Switzerland Location within Canton of Basel-Landschaft
- Coordinates: 47°29′N 7°37′E
- Country: Switzerland
- Canton: Basel-Landschaft
- District: Arlesheim

Government
  - Executive: Gemeinderat with 7 members
  - Mayor: Gemeindepräsident; Markus Eigenmann FDP/PRD (as of 2016)
  - Parliament: none (Gemeindeversammlung)

Area
  - Total: 6.93 km^{2} (2.68 sq mi)
- Elevation (Domplatz): 334 m (1,096 ft)

Population (June 2021)
  - Total: 9,240
  - Density: 1,330/km^{2} (3,450/sq mi)
- Demonym: German: Arlesheimer(in)
- Time zone: UTC+01:00 (CET)
  - Summer (DST): UTC+02:00 (CEST)
- Postal code: 4144
- SFOS number: 2763
- ISO 3166 code: CH-BL
- Surrounded by: Dornach (SO), Gempen (SO), Münchenstein, Muttenz, Reinach
- Website: www.arlesheim.ch

Arlesheim is a town and a municipality in the district of Arlesheim in the canton of Basel-Country in Switzerland. Its cathedral chapter seat, bishop's residence and cathedral are listed as a heritage site of national significance.

The cathedral has a Baroque organ built by the German builder Johann Andreas Silbermann, based in Alsace, in 1761. The instrument was restored by Metzler in 1959–1962, and is an example of the fusion of French and German organ building styles. It has been used in several recordings, including Lionel Rogg's recording of the complete organ works of J. S. Bach, for Harmonia Mundi France in 1970.

== History ==
Arlesheim is first mentioned in 708. In 1239 it was mentioned as Arlisheim.

=== Prehistoric settlements ===
The protected location on the western foot of the Gempen Plateau encouraged early settlement of the area. Paleolithic Magdalenian culture items from around 10,000 BC were discovered in the Birseck–Ermitage and Hollenberg 3 caves. Birseck–Ermitage was discovered in 1910 by Fritz Sartorius-Preiswerk, and Hollenberg 3 was discovered in 1950 by Martin Herkert. The caves contained traces of fires, spear points carved from reindeer antler, and pendants made from snail and mussel shells. From the end of the Palaeolithic era, Birseck–Ermitage cave contains galets colori, red-stripe-like painted limestone pebbles, and flint tools. From the Mesolithic period (c.6000–5000 BC), flint tools have been discovered at the Abri overhang at Hohlefels, excavated in 1905 by Fritz Sarasin, and in the Birseck–Hermitage cave. Some funerary objects from the largely unexplored transitional period between the Mesolithic to Neolithic period (around 5200 BC) were also discovered. Several Neolithic ax blades were discovered across the municipal area, with a concentration at Dachsenhöhle and Kleinen Höhle am Hohlefels that were excavated in 1952–1954 by Martin Herkert, Bernhard Hesse, and Andreas Schwabe. In the Kleinen Höhle, skeletal remains of children with grave goods as well as a typological flint spear points were also found. Horgen culture (around 3000 BC) ceramic vessels have also been found. From the Bronze Age, only a few, mostly generic items have been discovered. So far, no items from the Iron Age have been found.

=== Medieval settlement ===
The farm complex of Arlesheim was owned by Mont Sainte-Odile Monastery in Alsace starting in the 8th century. It was sold in 1239 to the Bishop of Basel Lüthold von Rötteln. In 1245 the Frohburg family withdrew their claims on the land, which left the Bishop with an uncontested title to the land. In 1273 he pledged the village to the Lords of Ramstein in exchange for a loan. The Bishops of Basel did not get the village back until 1435. After that Arlesheim belonged to the Bishop's Herrschaft of Birseck.

The inhabitants were initially part of the parish of Pfeffingen. However, by 1341 they possessed a parish church and by 1396 their own pastor. This parish church, the church of St. Odilia, was rebuilt in the late 17th century and demolished in 1816.

=== The Reformation to the Early Modern Period ===
While Arlesheim was probably under the influence of Basel through the counts of Birseck, it never entered into a Burgrecht treaty with the city. Despite Arlesheim's loose connection with Basel, it converted to the new Protestant faith in 1528 when Basel converted. About half a century later, in 1582, the Bishop of Basel, Jakob Christoph Blarer von Wartensee, succeeded in spreading the Counter-Reformation in Arlesheim.

In the Thirty Years War the surrounding countryside was damaged by looting and pillaging. Arlesheim, however, was off the main roads and was relatively untouched. It had developed as a small, rather out of the way wine-growing village with the Bishop's estates and wine-press. As a result, when the Basel cathedral council and priests moved from Freiburg im Breisgau in 1678, they went to Arlesheim. An administrative center and impressive early baroque residences were built in the town. Under the same artistic concept, and initially led by Franz Demess, the cathedral was built in 1679–1681. This was followed by the magnificent Domherrenhäuser which was built between 1680 and 1687. These new buildings made Arlesheim an attractive place for nobles, high clergy, diplomats, artists, and craftsmen. The court life of the canons also promoted indigenous craftsmen. In 1726 a mint opened in town. Then, in 1763 the seat of the Bailiwick of Birseck moved from Birseck Castle to the Andlauer Hof in Arlesheim. In 1785 Balbina von Andlau and Canon Heinrich von Ligerz created the Eremitage (Hermitage), the largest English garden in Switzerland, which was known throughout Europe and attracted many travelers.

The right to appoint Arlesheim's pastor was held by the Bishop of Basel until 1678, after which it went to the council of Basel's Cathedral. At the beginning of the 17th century the parish of Arlesheim was briefly united briefly with the parish of Reinach (in Basel-Country) into a single parish.

=== French Revolution to Modern Arlesheim ===
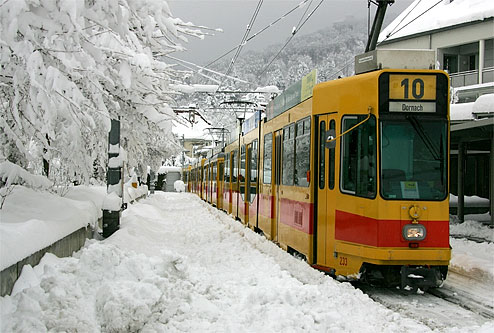
A tram in Arlesheim

After the short-lived Rauracian Republic (1792–93), the village was under French rule from 1793 to 1814. Between 1793 and 1800 it was part of the Département of Mont-Terrible and then in 1800–1814 it was part of the Département of Haut-Rhin. Under the revolutionary forces, the Cathedral and the Domherrenhäuser were nationalized. Courageous citizens bought the cathedral and prevented it from being demolished. Later, the parish acquired the building and the cathedral became a parish church. In 1814–1815, it was the seat of the coalition Governor General of the diocese of Basel. In 1815 the Canton of Basel was recreated. Arlesheim was part of the Canton of Basel until it split into two half-cantons in 1832. Arlesheim joined Basel-Country and became the capital of a district.

During the invasion of revolutionary France, the cathedral canons fled the city. The flight of the canons led to an economic depression in the village in the years following the French invasion. In 1830 Johann Siegmund Alioth moved from Basel to Arlesheim and set up the first mechanical silk-factory in Switzerland along the Birs. The factory operated for nearly a century and a half, until it closed in 1976. For his Reformed workers, Daniel August Alioth built a Reformed chapel in his garden in 1856. This Reformed church served the needs of just a few Reformed families throughout the entire Birseck. A Reformed parish was established in 1882 in Arlesheim.

In 1875 the Jura–Simplon Railway opened a line into Arlesheim, which was followed in 1902 by the Birseckbahn Basel-Arlesheim-Dornach tram line. In 1976 it was purchased by Baselland Transport. These two train lines gave further impetus to the industrial and service sectors including the Alioth electric equipment supply company in 1892, the anthroposophist Ita Wegman Clinic in 1921, and the Weleda remedies company.

Arlesheim has a mild climate and sunny vineyards, which made it a popular location for vacation villas. In 1880 the first housing estate was built in New-Arlesheim. The many workers who moved into Arlesheim fostered a sectarian shift in what was once a very Catholic village. The construction of the Reformed church in 1911–1912 encouraged more Reformed workers to follow. In 1990 about 41% of the population was Catholic, while 38% were Reformed. After 1960 Arlesheim developed into a residential community for the agglomeration of Basel. In 1990 over two-thirds of the workers were commuters, and 77% of the jobs were in the services sector. The ensuing infrastructure problems, including overbuilding, led to a town planning ordinance of 1971 and redevelopment of the village square in 1987 and 1991.

== Geography ==
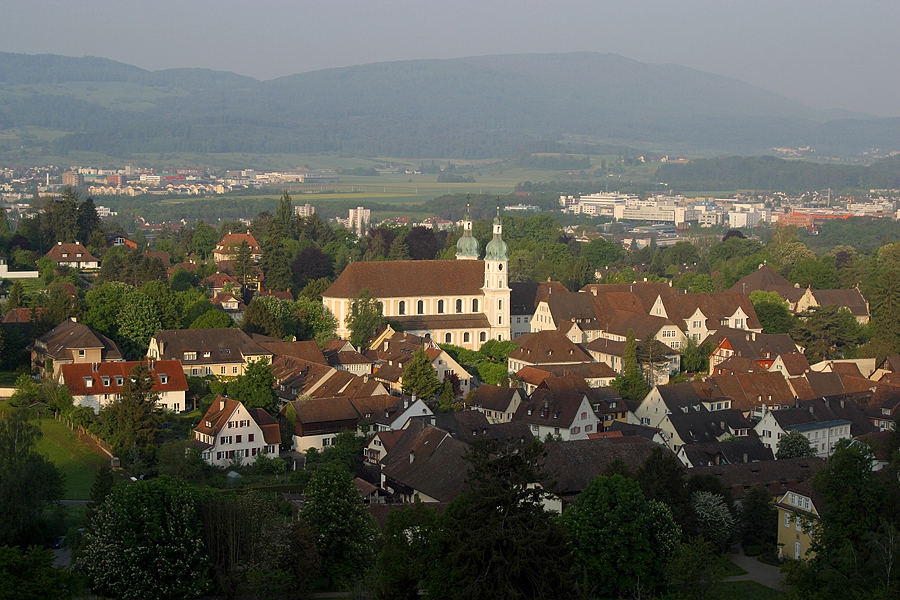
View over the old town of Arlesheim and the surrounding hills

Aerial view by Walter Mittelholzer (1922)

Arlesheim has an area, as of 2009, of 6.93 square kilometers (2.68 sq mi). Of this area, 0.65 km^{2} (0.25 sq mi) or 9.4% is used for agricultural purposes, while 3.64 km^{2} (1.41 sq mi) or 52.5% is forested. Of the rest of the land, 2.65 km^{2} (1.02 sq mi) or 38.2% is settled (buildings or roads), 0.03 km^{2} (7.4 acres) or 0.4% is either rivers or lakes.

Of the built-up area, industrial buildings made up 5.1% of the total area while housing and buildings made up 23.4% and transportation infrastructure made up 6.8%. while parks, green belts and sports fields made up 2.2%. Of the forested land, all of the forested land area is covered with heavy forests. f the agricultural land, 1.9% is used for growing crops and 4.8% is pastures, while 2.7% is used for orchards or vine crops. All the water in the municipality is flowing water.

The municipality is the capital of the district of the same name. It is located in the Birseck or the lower Birs valley. Originally a village along the river, it has grown to become part of the Agglomeration of Basel.

== Coat of arms ==
The blazon of the municipal coat of arms is Argent, a Wing Azure.

== Demographics ==
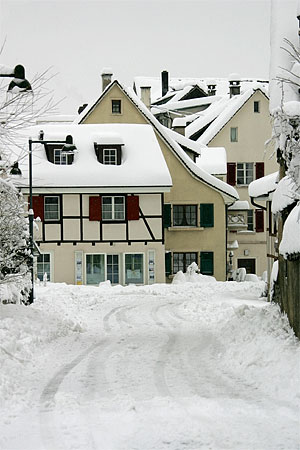
Houses on Ermitagestrasse in Arlesheim

Arlesheim has a population (as of June 2021) of 9,240. As of 2008, 18.8% of the population are resident foreign nationals. Over the last ten years (1997–2007) the population has changed at a rate of 6.2%.

Most of the population (as of 2000) speaks German (7,428 or 86.1%), with Italian being second most common (283 or 3.3%) and French being third (167 or 1.9%). There are 16 people who speak Romansh.

As of 2008, the gender distribution of the population was 46.5% male and 53.5% female. The population was made up of 7,232 Swiss citizens (80.8% of the population), and 1,722 non-Swiss residents (19.2%) Of the population in the municipality 1,686 or about 19.5% were born in Arlesheim and lived there in 2000. There were 1,132, or 13.1%, who were born in the same canton, while 3,391 or 39.3% were born somewhere else in Switzerland, and 2,151, or 24.9%, were born outside of Switzerland.

In 2008 there were 51 live births to Swiss citizens and 13 births to non-Swiss citizens, and in same time span there were 59 deaths of Swiss citizens and 13 non-Swiss citizen deaths. Ignoring immigration and emigration, the population of Swiss citizens decreased by 8 while the foreign population remained the same. There were 7 Swiss men and 8 Swiss women who immigrated back to Switzerland. At the same time, there were 13 non-Swiss men and 30 non-Swiss women who immigrated from another country to Switzerland. The total Swiss population change in 2008 (from all sources, including moves across municipal borders) was a decrease of 13 and the non-Swiss population change was a decrease of 5 people. This represents a population growth rate of −0.2%.

The age distribution, as of 2010, in Arlesheim is; 559 children, or 6.2% of the population, are between 0 and 6 years old, and 1,220 teenagers, or 13.6%, are between 7 and 19. Of the adult population, 798 people, or 8.9% of the population, are between 20 and 29 years old, 1,074 people, or 12.0%, are between 30 and 39, 1,429 people, or 16.0%, are between 40 and 49, and 1,840 people, or 20.5%, are between 50 and 64. As for the senior population, 1,454 people, or 16.2% of the population, are between 65 and 79 years old, and 580 people, or 6.5%, are over 80.

As of 2000, there were 3,388 people who were single and never married in the municipality. There were 4,192 married individuals, 537 widows or widowers, and 511 individuals who are divorced.

As of 2000, there were 3,830 private households in the municipality, and an average of 2.2 persons per household. There were 1,354 households that consist of only one person and 180 households with five or more people. Out of a total of 3,918 households that answered this question, 34.6% were households made up of just one person and 30 were adults who lived with their parents. Of the rest of the households, there are 1,192 married couples without children, 977 married couples with children. There were 215 single parents with a child or children. There were 62 households that were made up unrelated people and 88 households that were made some sort of institution or another collective housing.

In 2000 there were 1,039 single family homes (or 59.2% of the total) out of a total of 1,756 inhabited buildings. There were 368 multi-family buildings (21.0%), along with 226 multi-purpose buildings that were mostly used for housing (12.9%) and 123 other use buildings (commercial or industrial) that also had some housing (7.0%). Of the single family homes 104 were built before 1919, while 136 were built between 1990 and 2000. The greatest number of single family homes (225) were built between 1946 and 1960.

In 2000 there were 4,108 apartments in the municipality. The most common apartment size was 4 rooms of which there were 1,198. There were 211 single room apartments and 1,177 apartments with five or more rooms. Of these apartments, a total of 3,721 apartments (90.6% of the total) were permanently occupied, while 265 apartments (6.5%) were seasonally occupied and 122 apartments (3.0%) were empty. As of 2007, the construction rate of new housing units was 1.2 new units per 1000 residents. As of 2000 the average price to rent a two-room apartment was about 911.00 CHF (US$730, £410, €580), a three-room apartment was about 1153.00 CHF (US$920, £520, €740) and a four-room apartment cost an average of 1454.00 CHF (US$1160, £650, €930). The vacancy rate for the municipality, in 2008, was 0.7%.

The historical population is given in the following chart:

== Heritage sites of national significance ==
The Andlauerhof, the Domherrenhaus at Domstrasse 2, the Domherrenhäuser am Domplatz, the Cathedral Church, the Hermitage site which includes the ruins of Birseck Castle, as well as Paleolithic cave dwellings, an early cult site and Neolithic graves and Reichenstein Castle are listed as Swiss heritage site of national significance. The entire village of Arlesheim is part of the Inventory of Swiss Heritage Sites.

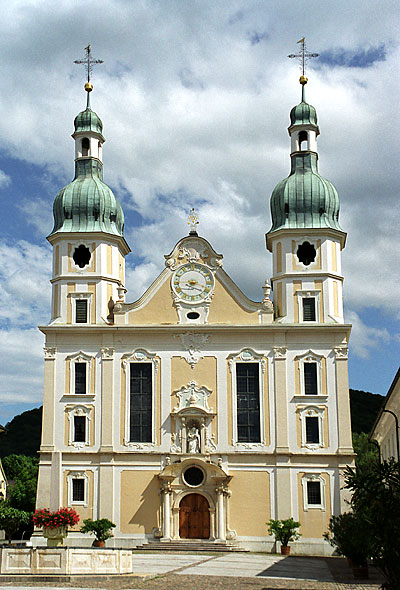
Domkirche (Cathedral Church)

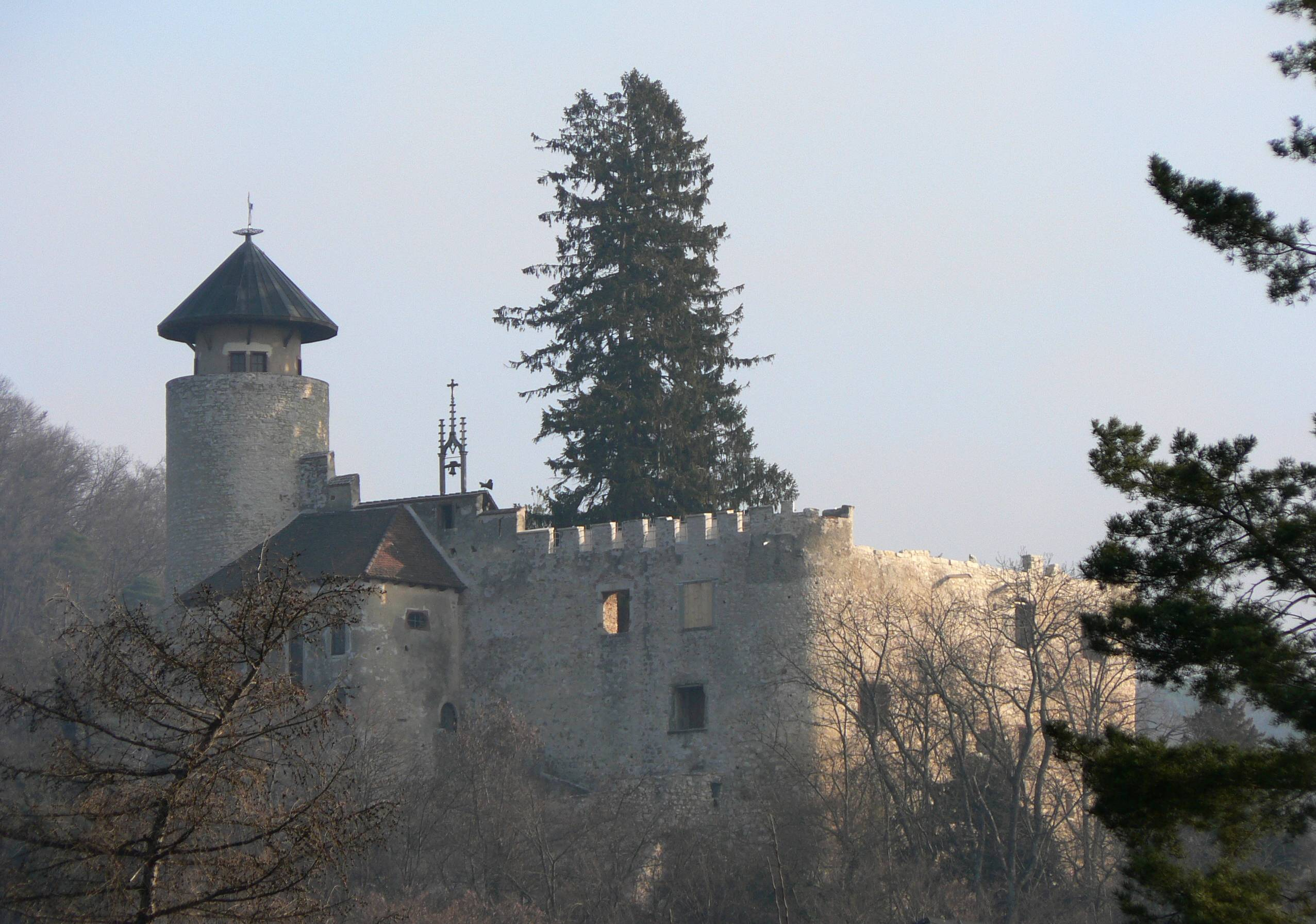
Hermitage with ruins of Birseck Castle

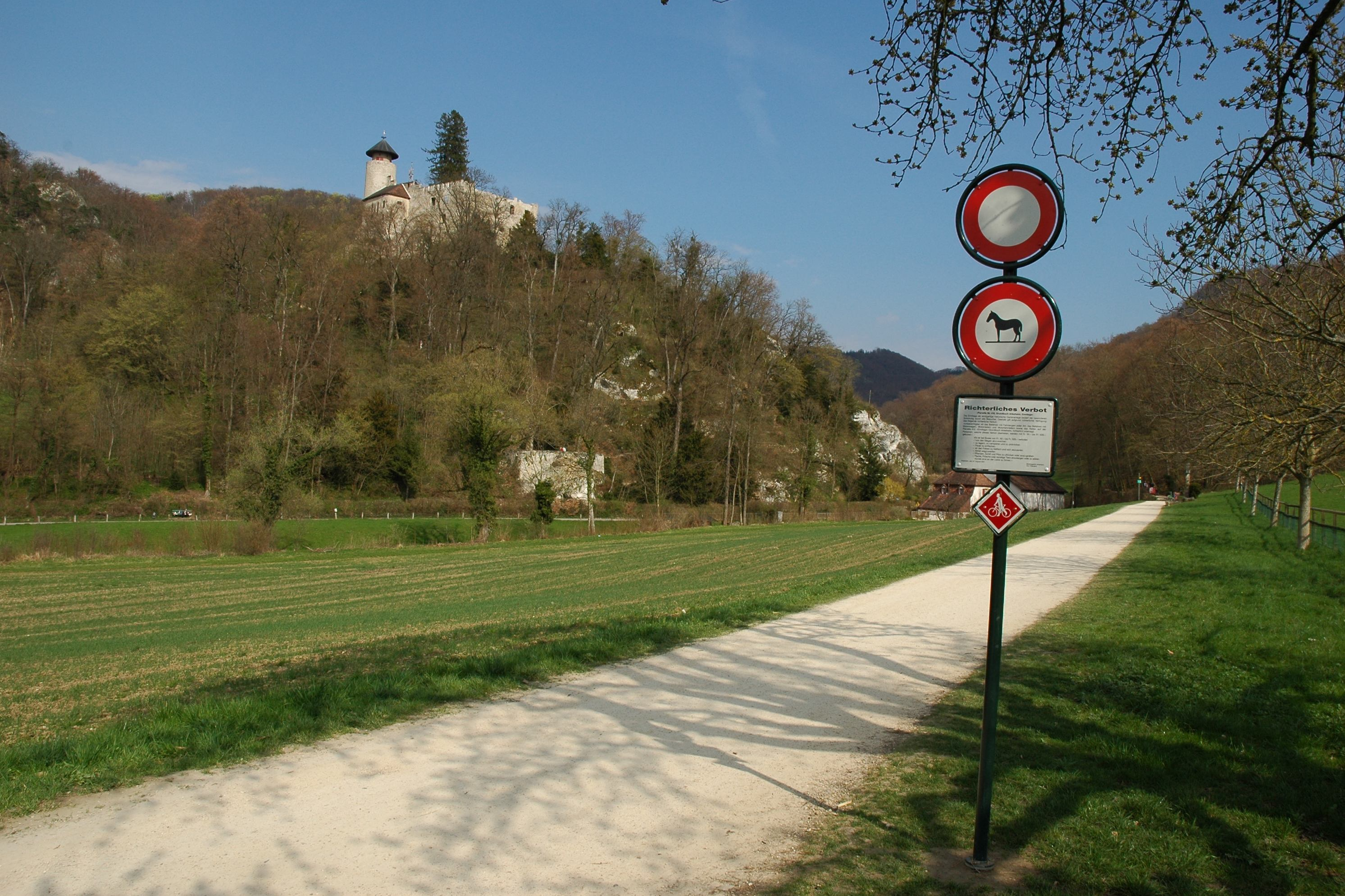
Hermitage site

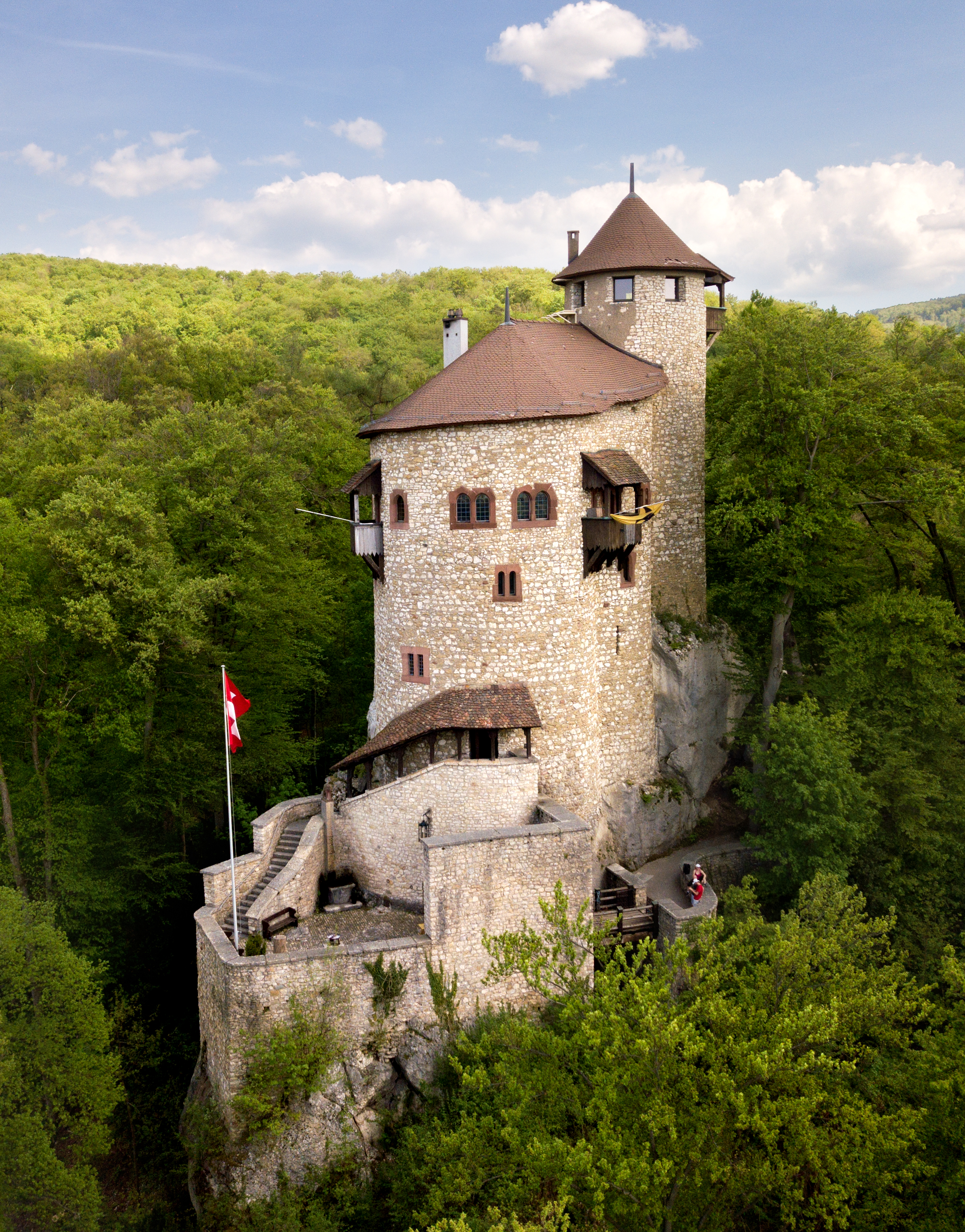
Reichenstein Castle

== Politics ==
In the 2007 federal election the most popular party was the SP which received 24.42% of the vote. The next three most popular parties were the Green Party (22.1%), the FDP (20.17%) and the SVP (17.8%). In the federal election, a total of 3,186 votes were cast, and the voter turnout was 53.1%.

== Economy ==
As of 2007, Arlesheim had an unemployment rate of 1.69%. As of 2005, there were 71 people employed in the primary economic sector and about 10 businesses involved in this sector. 748 people were employed in the secondary sector and there were 67 businesses in this sector. 3,979 people were employed in the tertiary sector, with 345 businesses in this sector. There were 4,271 residents of the municipality who were employed in some capacity, of which females made up 47.2% of the workforce.

In 2008 the total number of full-time equivalent jobs was 4,213. The number of jobs in the primary sector was 9, all of which were in agriculture. The number of jobs in the secondary sector was 743, of which 479 or (64.5%) were in manufacturing and 236 (31.8%) were in construction. The number of jobs in the tertiary sector was 3,461. In the tertiary sector; 1,121 or 32.4% were in wholesale or retail sales or the repair of motor vehicles, 469 or 13.6% were in the movement and storage of goods, 94 or 2.7% were in a hotel or restaurant, 68 or 2.0% were in the information industry, 77 or 2.2% were the insurance or financial industry, 256 or 7.4% were technical professionals or scientists, 136 or 3.9% were in education and 835 or 24.1% were in health care.

In 2000, there were 3,548 workers who commuted into the municipality and 3,045 workers who commuted away. The municipality is a net importer of workers, with about 1.2 workers entering the municipality for every one leaving. About 11.8% of the workforce coming into Arlesheim are coming from outside Switzerland, while 0.3% of the locals commute out of Switzerland for work. Of the working population, 31.3% used public transportation to get to work, and 35.9% used a private car.

== Religion ==
From the 2000 census, 3,135 or 36.3% were Roman Catholic, while 2,842 or 32.9% belonged to the Swiss Reformed Church. Of the rest of the population, there were 76 members of an Orthodox church (or about 0.88% of the population), there were 34 individuals (or about 0.39% of the population) who belonged to the Christian Catholic Church, and there were 310 individuals (or about 3.59% of the population) who belonged to another Christian church. There were 13 individuals (or about 0.15% of the population) who were Jewish, and 282 (or about 3.27% of the population) who were Muslim. There were 11 individuals who were Buddhist, 38 individuals who were Hindu and 9 individuals who belonged to another church. 1,553 (or about 18.00% of the population) belonged to no church, are agnostic or atheist, and 325 individuals (or about 3.77% of the population) did not answer the question.

== Transport ==
Arlesheim sits on the Basel–Biel/Bienne line and is served by local trains at Dornach-Arlesheim. It is also served by Line 10 of the Basel tramway network.

== Education ==
In Arlesheim about 3,246 or (37.6%) of the population have completed non-mandatory upper secondary education, and 1,950 or (22.6%) have completed additional higher education (either university or a Fachhochschule). Of the 1,950 who completed tertiary schooling, 52.5% were Swiss men, 27.3% were Swiss women, 10.9% were non-Swiss men and 9.3% were non-Swiss women. As of 2000, there were 186 students in Arlesheim who came from another municipality, while 458 residents attended schools outside the municipality.

== Notable people ==
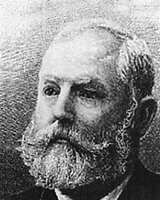
Emil Frey, 1890s

- Johann Baptist Stuntz (1753 in Arlesheim – 1836), a Swiss-German landscape painter and lithographer
- Emil Frey (1838 in Arlesheim – 1922), a Swiss politician, soldier in the American Civil War and member of the Swiss Federal Council (1890–1897)
- Andreas Heusler (1865–1940), a Swiss medievalist, specialising in Germanic and Norse studies; lived in Arlesheim from 1920
- Adolf Grabowsky (1880 – 1969 in Arlesheim), a German political scientist
- Wilhelm Pelikan (1893 – 1981 in Arlesheim), a chemist, anthroposophist, pharmacist, gardener and anthroposophical medicine practitioner; lived in Arlesheim from 1965
- Max Jordan (1895–1977), a pioneering radio journalist for the NBC network in Europe in the 1930s, lived in Arlesheim 1931–1939.
- Annemarie Düringer (1925 in Arlesheim – 2014), a Swiss actress
- Barbara Berlusconi (born 1984 in Arlesheim), business executive

== Twin town ==
- Ofterdingen, Germany
