= Arlesheim Cathedral =

Coordinates: 47.4922°N 7.6208°E

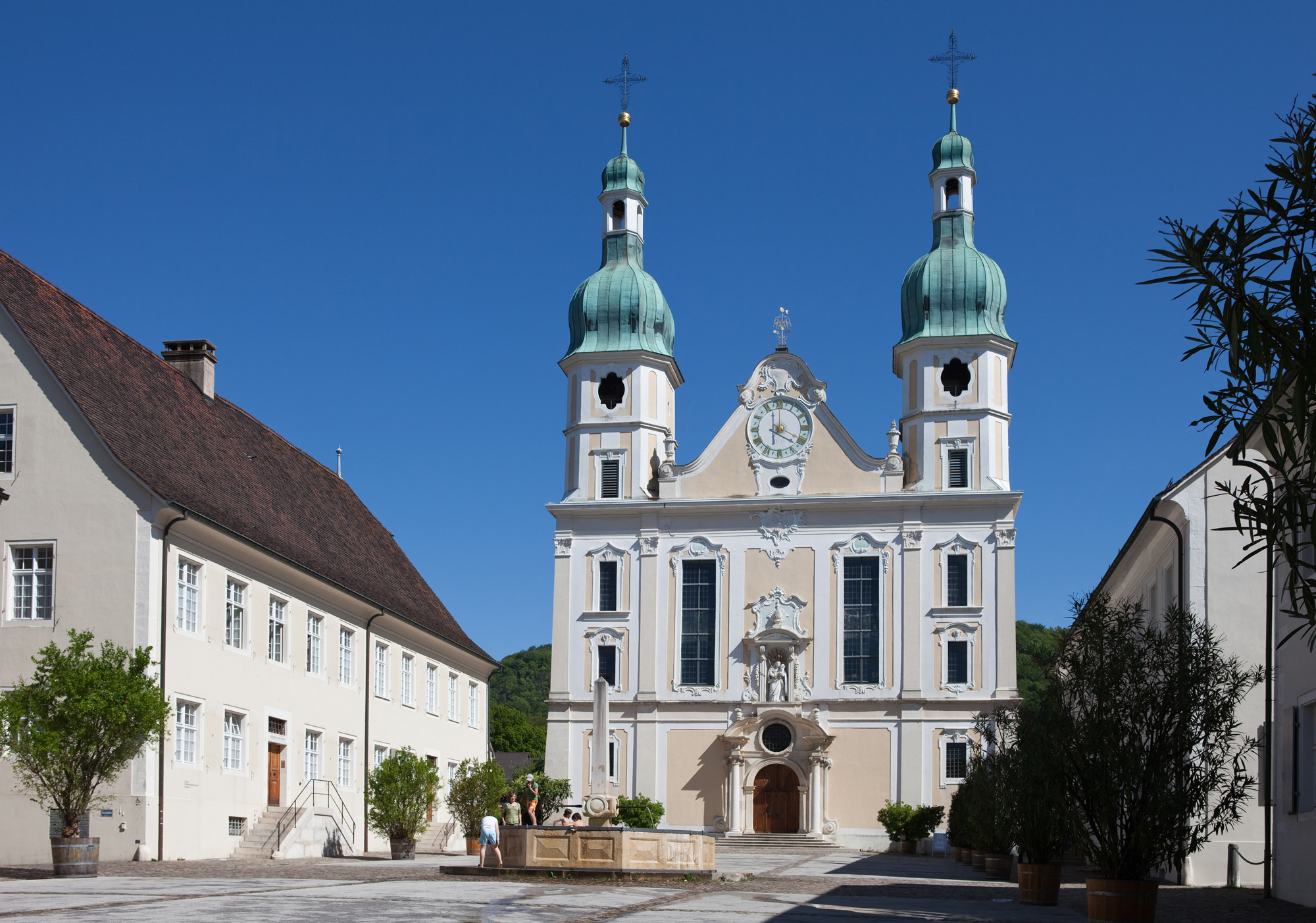
- Arlesheim Cathedral
- Location: Arlesheim
- Country: Switzerland
- Denomination: Roman Catholic Church

Arlesheim Cathedral (German: Arlesheimer Dom) is a Roman Catholic church, which now serves as the main church of Arlesheim. From 1679 to 1792 it was the church of the displaced cathedral chapter of the Diocese of Basel in Basel-Landschaft in the northern part of Switzerland.

During the French Revolution the Prince Bishop Sigismund von Roggenbach had to go into exile in Constance, returning to Freiburg in 1793. The church building and its contents were auctioned after serving successively as a wine cellar and a stable. It became a religious building again in 1812, and was later consecrated as a parish church of the parish of Arlesheim. It is listed as a cultural monument of national importance in Switzerland.

== See also ==
- Roman Catholicism in Switzerland
- Roman Catholic Diocese of Basel
