= Carl Heymanns Verlag =

German publishing house

Carl Heymanns Verlag GmbH is a legal, specialized publishing house with its seat in Cologne, Germany.

== History ==
On 1 October 1815 Carl Heymann founded, at the age of 23, a bookshop in Głogów, Silesia. He later extended the bookshop into a publishing house. In 1835 he moved to Berlin. In 1846, Heymann was awarded the title of "councillor of commerce" (German: Kommerzienrat) by the Prussian King. The publishing house then began publishing collections of decisions of the Prussian High Court. Heymann died in 1862.

In 1871, his grandson Otto Löwenstein took over the management of the publishing house. The activity of the publishing house focused on law and administration. In 1918, Anni Gallus, the foster daughter of Otto Löwenstein, became owner of the publishing house.

In 1945, the head office in Berlin was destroyed. In 1950, the publishing house established a head office in Detmold first, in Cologne then. In addition, branch offices in Berlin, Munich and Bonn were established. The collections of decisions of federal high courts (e.g., BGHZ, BGHSt) became a focal point of the publishing house's activities.

In 1986, Bertram Gallus assumed the leadership of the publishing house after the death of his father Hans-Jörg Gallus. In 2004, Andreas Gallus took over the control of the company after the death of his uncle Bertram Gallus. In 2006, the publishing house was sold to Dutch media group Wolters Kluwer and was converted into a GmbH. Ulrich Hermann and Christoph Knauer were then appointed as managers of the firm.

The publishing house publishes the Zeitschrift für Bergrecht.
