= Daniel August Alioth =

Swiss merchant and officer (1816–1889)

- Born: 15 November 1816; Guebwiller, Alsace, France
- Died: 24 January 1889 (aged 72); Arlesheim, Switzerland
- Occupations: Merchant; army officer; politician
- Spouse: Maria Falckner (m. 1840)
- Children: Ludwig Rudolf Alioth
- Father: Johann Siegmund Alioth

Daniel August Alioth (15 November 1816 – 24 January 1889) was a Swiss merchant and army officer. A partner in his father's firm and later its head, he was a general staff officer in the Sonderbund War and became a federal colonel in 1863. He co-founded the Basellandschaftliche Hypothekenbank in 1849 and the Basler Versicherungsgesellschaft gegen Feuerschaden in 1863.

== Biography ==
Daniel August Alioth was born on 15 November 1816 in Guebwiller in Alsace, the son of Johann Siegmund Alioth. In 1840 he married Maria Falckner, daughter of the physician Johann Ludwig Falckner. His son was the engineer and industrialist Ludwig Rudolf Alioth.

Alioth was a merchant and a partner in his father's firm, whose management he later took over. He was a general staff officer in the Sonderbund War, and in 1863 he became a federal colonel (eidgenössischer Oberst). In 1849 he co-founded the Basellandschaftliche Hypothekenbank, and in 1863 the Basel fire insurance company (Basler Versicherungsgesellschaft gegen Feuerschaden).

In 1854–1855 Alioth was a member of the cantonal parliament (Landrat) of Basel-Landschaft. He was a member of the municipal council (Gemeinderat) of Arlesheim, and from 1854 an honorary citizen of Arlesheim. He died there on 24 January 1889.

== Bibliography ==
- Der Schweizerische Generalstab, 3, 11 f.
