= Bourette =

Coarse, irregular slubbed fabric made with bourette yarns

Bourette is a silk fabric with bumps often blended with other yarns made of Bourette fibers. The name "Bourette" is from its constituting fiber. It has a rough surface incorporating multicolored threads and knots of spun silk. The fabric is made with silk bourette and wool or cotton yarn. Bourette is a lightweight single cloth with a rough, knotty, and uneven surface.

== Silk waste ==
Silk waste has many copious names whereas Floss is a general name for silk waste. Other names are 'Schappe' or 'echappe.'

"Schapping" is a step of silk production of fermentation at low temperature for softening the gum. Schappe is one of the made products from Silk waste/Floss.

=== Bourette and Florette ===
Silk waste consists of two types, Bourette and Florette. The bourette fibers are short in length compared to the 'Florette', which are long silk fibers, suitable for products such as combed or worsted materials.

== Construction ==
=== Bourette yarn ===
Bourette yarn is a coarse, irregular slubbed yarn type made of silk waste fiber created during silk processing.

=== Weave ===
The fabric is a plain weave fabric but also possible with twill weave. The warp is made with wool or other types of yarns, and the weft is bourette. The yarn slubs provide a unique texture with small fancy colored lumps, scattered throughout.

== Uses ==
Bourette was used for dresses, and furnishing material.
