= Silk waste =

Short lengths of silk, as from broken cocoons, which are spun like staple fibers

Silk waste includes all kinds of raw silk which may be unwindable, and therefore unsuited to the throwing process. Before the introduction of machinery applicable to the spinning of silk waste, the refuse from cocoon reeling, and also from silk winding, which is now used in producing spun silk fabrics, was nearly all destroyed as being useless, with the exception of that which could be hand-combed and spun by means of the distaff and spinning wheel, a method which is still practised by some of the peasantry in India and other countries in Asia.

== Sources ==
The supply of waste silk is drawn from the following sources:

- The silkworm, when commencing to spin, emits a dull, lustreless and uneven thread with which it suspends itself from the twigs and leaves of the tree upon which it has been feeding, or the straws provided for it by attendants in the worm-rearing establishments: this first thread is unreelable, and, moreover, is often mixed with straw, leaves and twigs.
- The outside layers of the true cocoon are too coarse and uneven for reeling; and as the worm completes its task of spinning, the thread becomes finer and weaker, so both the extreme outside and inside layers are put aside as waste.
- Pierced cocoons, that is, those from which the moth of the silkworm has emerged-and damaged cocoons.
- During the process of reeling from the cocoon the silk often breaks; and both in finding a true and reliable thread, and in joining the ends, there is unavoidable waste.
- Raw silk skeins are often re-reeled; and in this process part has to be discarded: this being known to the trade as gum-waste. The same term—gum-waste—is applied to "waste" made in the various processes of silk throwing; but manufacturers using threads known technically as organzines and trams call the surplus "manufacturer's waste."

== Processing ==
A silk "throwster" receives the silk in skein form, the thread of which consists of a number of silk fibres wound together to make a certain diameter or size, the separate fibre having actually been spun by the worm. The silk-waste spinner receives the silk in quite a different form: merely the raw material, packed in bales of various sizes and weights, the contents being a much-tangled mass of all lengths of fibre mixed with much foreign matter, such as ends of straws, twigs, leaves, worms and chrysalis. It is the spinner's business to straighten out these fibres, with the aid of machinery, and then to so join them that they become a thread, which is known as spun silk.

All silk produced by the worm is composed of two substances: fibroin, the true thread, and sericin, which is a hard, gummy coating of the fibroin. Before the silk can be manipulated by machinery to any advantage, the gum coating must be removed by dissolving and washing it away. Where the method used in achieving this operation is through fermentation, the product is called schappe. The former, schapping, is the French, Italian and Swiss method, from which the silk when finished is neither so bright nor so good in colour as the discharged silk; but it is very clean and level, and for some purposes essential, as, for instance, in velvet manufacture.

== See also ==
- Bourette
- Matka (silk)
- Textile manufacturing
