= Guillaume Briçonnet =

Guillaume Briçonnet may refer to

- Guillaume Briçonnet (cardinal) (1445–1514)
- Guillaume Briçonnet (bishop of Meaux) (c. 1472–1534) his son
