= Humanism in France =

Aspect of the history of humanism

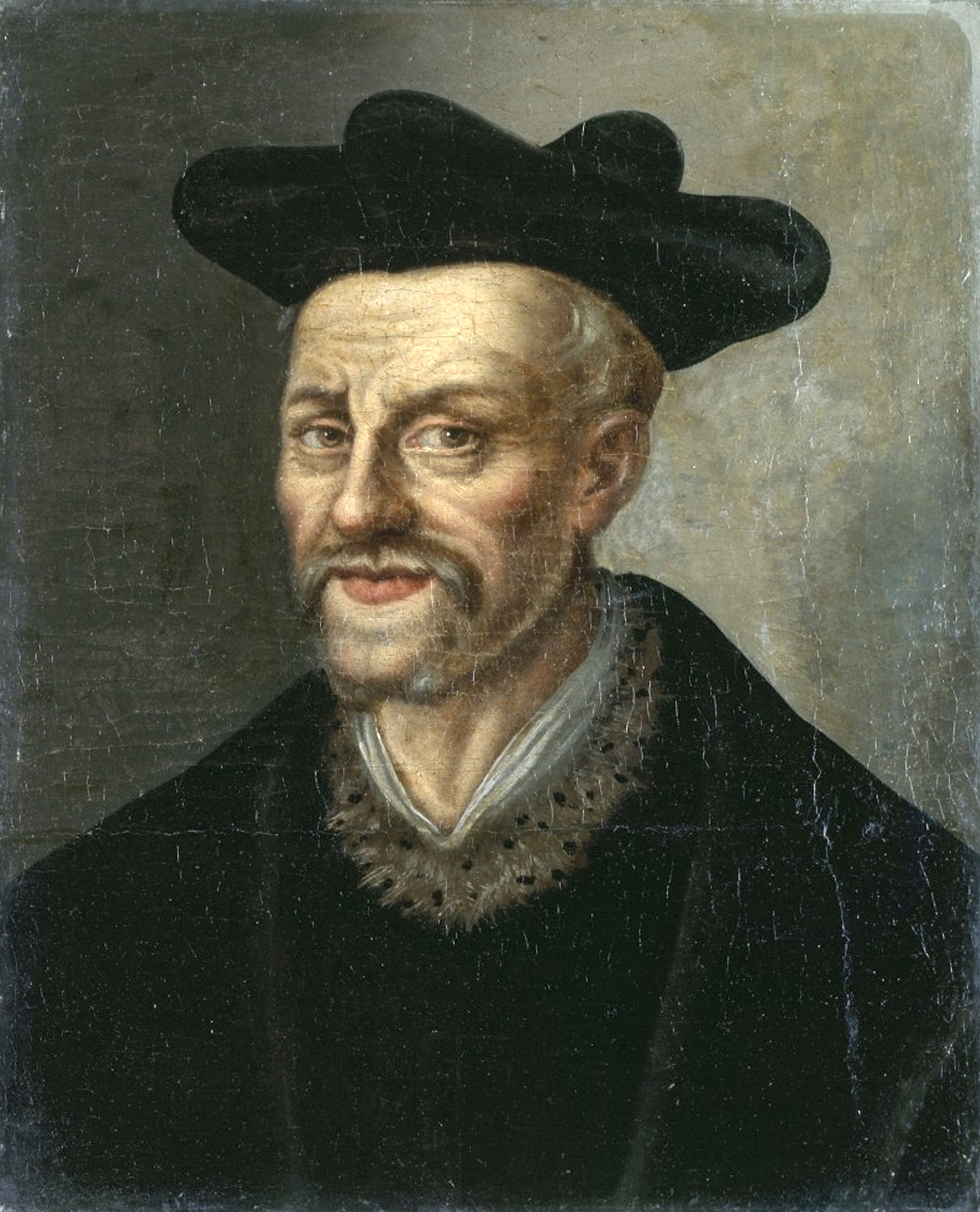
François Rabelais

Renaissance humanism began to develop in France in the 15th century, after the Hundred Years' War between France and England ended, and spreading from Italy, but did not become a distinct movement until the 16th century.

== History ==
In 1464, Raoul Lefèvre composed for the Duke of Burgundy a history of Troy. At that time the French still regarded themselves as descendants of Hector. If we except the Sorbonne, the University of Paris, none of the French universities took part in the movement. Individual writers and printing-presses at Paris, Lyon, Rouen and other cities became its centres and sources. Guillaume Fichet and Robert Gaguin are usually looked upon as the first French Humanists. Fichet introduced "the eloquence of Rome" at Paris and set up a press at the Sorbonne. He corresponded with Bessarion and had in his library volumes of Petrarch, Guarino of Verona and other Italians. Gaguin copied and corrected Suetonius in 1468 and other Latin authors. Poggio Bracciolini's jest book and some of Valla's writings were translated into French. In the reign of Louis XI, who gloried in the title "the first Christian king", French poets celebrated his deeds. The homage of royalty took in part the place among the literary men of France that the cult of antiquity occupied in Italy.

Ancient Greek, which had been completely forgotten in France, had its first teachers in Gregory Tifernas, who reached Paris, 1458, Janus Lascaris, who returned with Charles VIII, and Hermonymus of Sparta, who had Johann Reuchlin and Guilielmus Budaeus (known variously as William Budaeus (English), Guillaume Budé (French) and Guilielmus Budaeus (Latin)) among his scholars. An impetus was given to the new studies by the Italian, Hieronymus Aleander, afterwards famous for his association with Martin Luther at Worms. He lectured in Paris, 1509, on Plato and issued a Latino-Greek lexicon. In 1512 his pupil, Vatable, published the Greek grammar of Manuel Chrysoloras. Budaeus, perhaps the foremost Greek scholar of his day, founded the Collège Royal, 1530, and finally induced Francis I to provide for instruction in Biblical Hebrew and Greek. The University of Paris at the close of the 14th century was sunk into a low condition and Erasmus bitterly complained of the food, the morals and the intellectual standards of the Collège de Montaigu which he attended. Budaeus urged the combination of the study of the Scriptures with the study of the classics and exclaimed of the Gospel of John, "What is it, if not the almost perfect sanctuary of the truth!"

Jacques Lefèvre d'Étaples studied at the Universities of Paris, Pavia, Padua and Cologne and, for longer or shorter periods, tarried in the greater Italian cities. He knew Greek and some Hebrew. From 1492 to 1506 he was engaged in editing the works of Aristotle and Raymundus Lullus and then, under the protection of Guillaume Briçonnet, Bishop of Meaux, he turned his attention to theology. It was his purpose to offset the Sentences of Peter the Lombard by a system of theology giving only what the Scriptures teach. In 1509, he published the Psalterum quintuplex, a combination of five Latin versions of the Psalms, including a revision and a commentary by his own hand. In 1512, he issued a revised Latin translation of the Pauline Epistles with commentary. In this work, he asserted the authority of the Bible and the doctrine of justification by faith, without appreciating, however, the far-reaching significance of the latter opinion. Three years after the appearance of Luther's New Testament, Lefèvre's French translation appeared, 1523. It was made from the Vulgate, as was his translation of the Old Testament, 1528. In 1522 and 1525, appeared his commentaries on the four Gospels and the Catholic Epistles. The former was put on the Index by the Sorbonne. The opposition to the free spirit of inquiry and to the Reformation, which the Sorbonne stirred up and French royalty adopted, forced him to flee to Strassburg and then to the liberal court of Marguerite de Navarre.

Among those who came into contact with Lefèvre were Guillaume Farel and John Calvin, the Reformers of Geneva. Another student of Lefèvre was the anatomist Jacques Dubois. In the meantime Clément Marot, 1496–1544, the first true poet of the French literary revival, was composing his French versification of the Psalms and of Ovid's Metamorphoses. The Psalms were sung for pleasure by French princes and later for worship in Geneva and by the Huguenots. When Calvin studied the humanities and law at Bourges, Orléans and Paris, about 1520, he had for teachers Maturin Cordier and Pierre de L'Estoile, the canonists, and Melchior Wolmar, teacher of Greek, whose names the future Reformer records with gratitude and respect.

== See also ==
- Greek scholars in the Renaissance
