= Canton of Basel =

Historical canton of Switzerland

Coordinates: 47°33′N 7°34′E

Canton of Basel Kanton Basel
- Canton of the Old Swiss Confederacy, of the Helvetic Republic and of Restoration Switzerland
- 1501–1833
- Flag Coat of arms

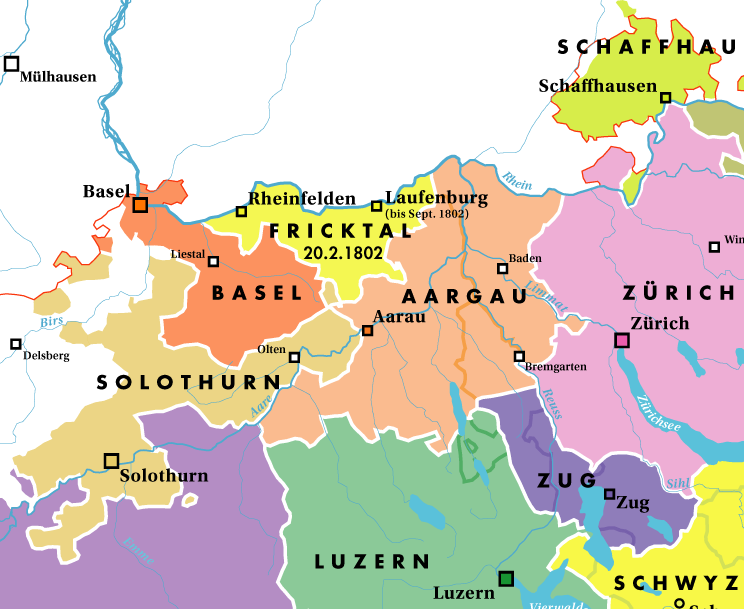
- The canton of Basel, shown within the northern part of the Helvetic Republic, as at 1802; the canton of Fricktal (adjacent) joined the Aargau later that year.
- Capital: Basel
- History
  - established: 1501
  - Peace of Westphalia: 15 May 1648
  - Rauracian Republic: 1792–1793
  - Helvetic Republic: 1798–1802
  - Partition into half-cantons: 16 August 1833
Preceded by	Succeeded by
Bishopric of Basel / Bishopric of Basel	Basel-City / Basel-Country; Basel-Country / Basel-Country

Basel was a canton of Switzerland that was in existence between 1501 and 1833, when it was split into the two half-cantons of Basel-City and Basel-Country.

== Background ==
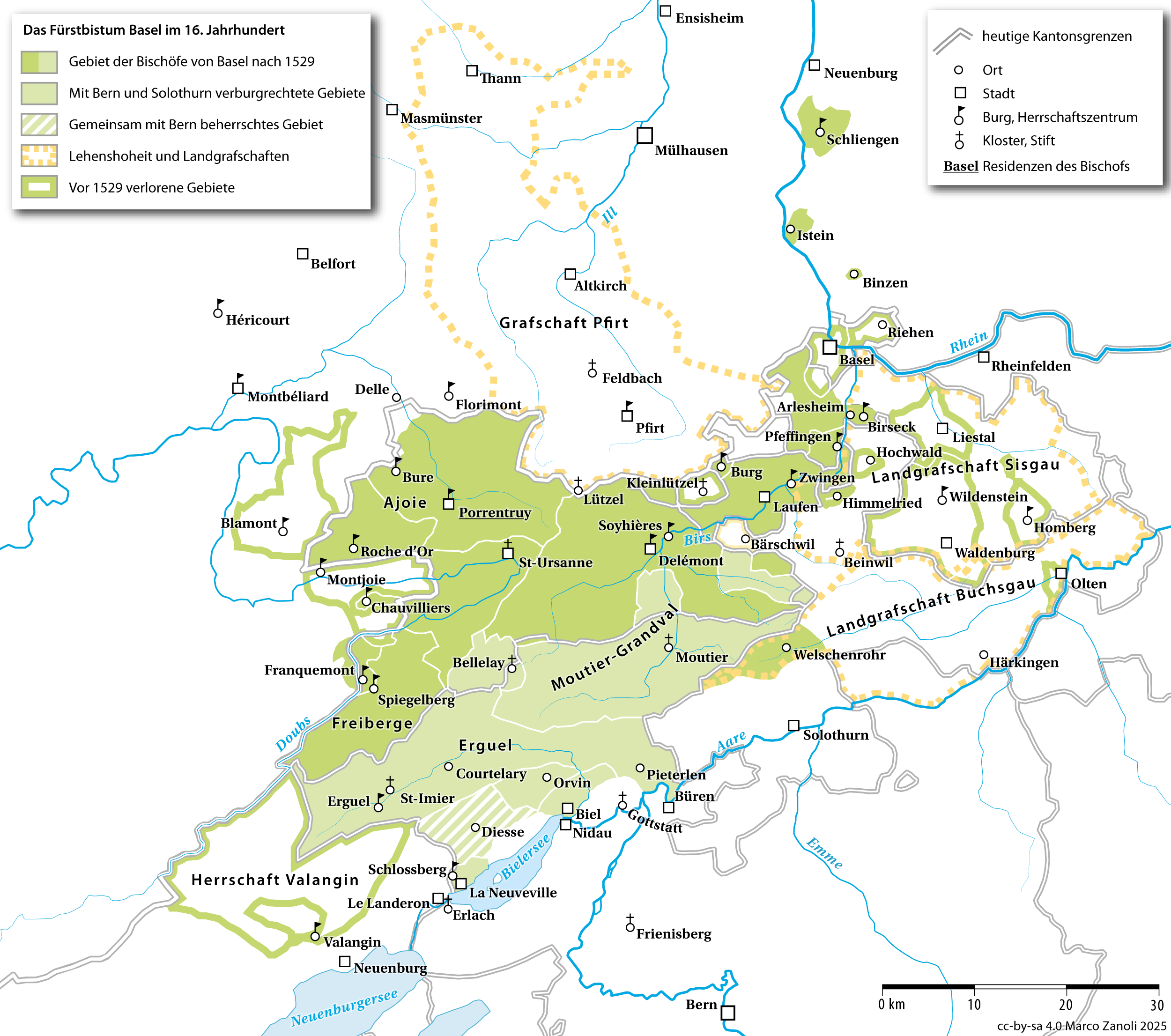
The Prince-Bishopric of Basel in the 16th century

Before the Protestant Reformation, Basel was ruled by prince-bishops (see Bishop of Basel, whose memory is preserved in the crosier shown on the Basel coat of arms, as above). In the later 15th century, in the wake of the Council of Basel (1431–49), the city of Basel grew in wealth and importance. The University of Basel was established in 1459, and the city became an intellectual center of the German Renaissance in the years leading up to the Reformation. Erasmus of Rotterdam taught in Basel, and early printshops were set up by Johannes Petri and Johann Froben. In 1495, Basel was incorporated in the Upper Rhenish Imperial Circle, the bishop sitting on the Bench of the Ecclesiastical Princes.

== Establishment ==
As a direct consequence of the Swabian War, resolved by the 1499 Treaty of Basel, Basel and the Imperial City of Schaffhausen joined the Swiss Confederation in 1501, as the confederacy's 11th and 12th states, with Appenzell following suit 12 years later to complete the Dreizehn Orte that made up Switzerland until the French Revolutionary Wars.

The canton of Basel seceded from the prince-bishopric, and the secular rule of the bishops of Basel from this time was limited to territories west of Basel, more or less corresponding to the modern canton of Jura. Even though the bishops of Basel no longer held secular authority over the city of Basel, they continued to reside in the city until the Protestant Reformation.

== Reformation ==
In 1503, the new bishop Christoph von Utenheim refused to give Basel a new constitution whereupon, to show its power, the city began the construction of a new city hall. The reformation was brought to Basel by Johannes Oecolampadius cathedral preacher under von Utenheim and co-editor of Erasmus' first edition of the Greek New Testament. Von Utenheim resigned on 19 February 1527. He was succeeded by Philippe von Gundelsheim, canon at Basel Münster since 1510.

In 1529, the city became Protestant under Oecolampadius and the bishop's seat was moved to Porrentruy. In 1530, Laufental rebelled against the bishop, but were suppressed using forces from Solothurn. Because of insolvency, the prince-bishopric grew increasingly dependent on the city of Basel, with the city granting him a mortgage on Birseck Castle in 1542, 1544, and 1545. In 1547, the bishop formally agreed to allow the city to choose its own religion, recognizing that the city had already become Protestant.

The Basel patriciate ("Daig") now played a pivotal role in city affairs as they gradually established themselves as a de facto city aristocracy. The Bernoulli family, which included important 17th- and 18th-century mathematicians such as Jakob Bernoulli, Johann Bernoulli and Daniel Bernoulli, were from Basel. The 18th-century mathematician Leonhard Euler was born in Basel and studied under Johann Bernoulli.

Intended as a defence of Huguenots then persecuted in France, Calvin's Institutes, authored in Basel, was a 1536 exposition of Protestant Christian doctrine which later became known as Calvinism.

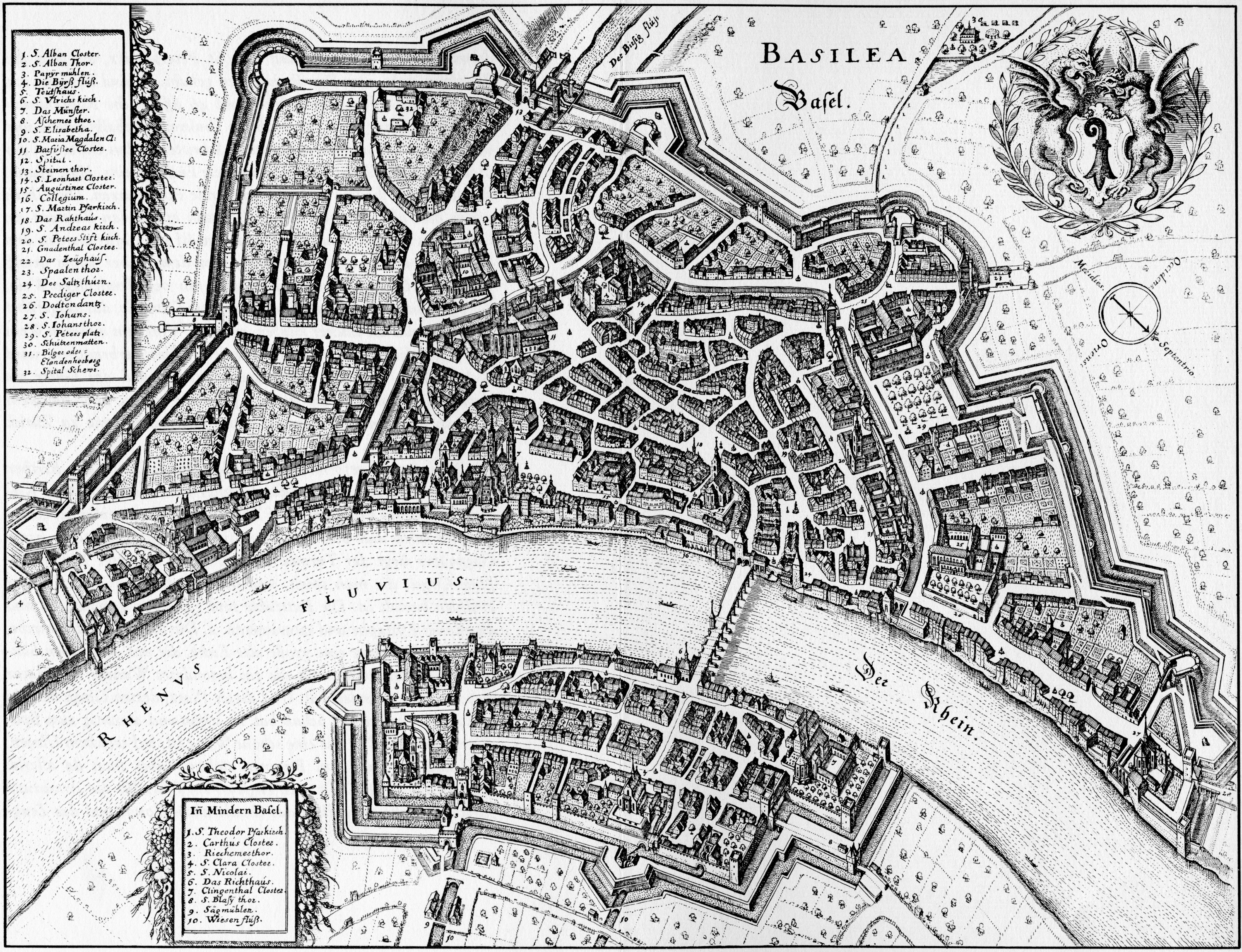
Map of Basel in 1642, engraved by Matthäus Merian, oriented with SW at the top and NE at the bottom.

The first edition of Christianae religionis institutio (Institutes of the Christian Religion – John Calvin's great exposition of Calvinist doctrine) was published at Basel in March 1536. In 1543, De humani corporis fabrica, the first book on human anatomy, was published and printed in Basel by Andreas Vesalius (1514–1564).

The 1648 Peace of Westphalia finally brought about Imperial recognition of the independence of the Swiss cantons, removing the de jure (but not de facto) overlordship of the Holy Roman Empire rejected by the then–Prince-Bishopric nearly 150 years earlier.

== Unrest and insurrection ==
In 1792, the Rauracian Republic, a revolutionary French client republic, was created, lasting for a few months into the following year before being partitioned between a restored canton of Basel, later within the Helvetic Republic, and the French First Republic.

Until 1830, Basel was a unified canton, with citizens from both the city and the municipalities of the countryside sitting in the Kantonsparlament. The cantonal parliament was dominated by members from the city, though its population was less than that of the combined countryside. This had not previously been a source of grievance, but in 1830 the Baselbieter, or citizens from the countryside, grew increasingly distrustful of the city. At a meeting in Bad Bubendorf on 18 October 1830, 25 Baselbieter wrote to the "esteemed gentlemen and noblemen in Basel", demanding equal rights between city and countryside and a representation in parliament in proportion to their numbers.

When the city rejected this demand, resentment from the countryside region grew still larger to the extent that the city feared an attack. In Liestal a few men of the countryside formed a new provincial government protected by an army of 3,000. The government was however short-lived as on 16 January 1831 a force from Basel occupied Liestal, driving out the new government. A number of villages, such as Gelterkinden, Reigoldswil, Anwil and Bubendorf remained loyal to Basel, though coming under threat from the rebels. The unrest in the countryside persisted into 1832 and both sides committed injustices upon the other.

On 3 August 1833 over 1200 troops of the city armed with 14 cannons marched on Liestal, but at the Battle of Hülftenschanz, which took place between Pratteln and Frenkendorf, the city's troops were forced back to Basel by the superior numbers of the rebels. Their route back to the city was ambushed and the city forces took heavy losses.

== Partition ==
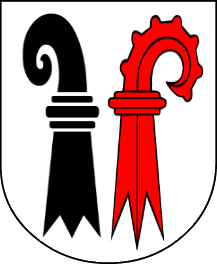
A cantonal coat of arms combining the coats of arms of the two half cantons, was in use from 1833 to 1999 when the "full canton" needed representation, e.g. in the Standesscheiben shown in the glass dome of the Federal Palace of Switzerland. The same combined coat of arms would be used for the suggested re-united canton.

After this conflict, the highest Swiss authority, the Tagsatzung, was petitioned on 17 August 1833 to separate the canton of Basel; nine days later, the partition into half-cantons, modelled after the precedent of Unterwalden and Appenzell, was effected.

From the country municipalities it allocated only Riehen, Bettingen and Kleinhüningen – which would otherwise have been an exclave of Basel-Country between Basel-City and the Grand Duchy of Baden – to the new half-canton of Basel-City. The remaining municipalities formed the new canton of Basel-Country.

The Swiss Constitution of 1844 continued to recognize "Basel" as one of twenty-two "sovereign cantons" of Switzerland, enumerated as Basel (Stadt und Land). In this sense, as a sovereign member of the Swiss Confederacy, the canton of Basel continued to exist until 1999, when the revised constitution recognised the two former half-cantons as "cantons" for the first time.

== Suggested re-unification ==
Several attempts have been made to reunite Basel-City and Basel-Country. In 1969, the citizens of Basel-Country defeated the motion in a referendum. The two cantons have since concluded a number of co-operation agreements, such as joint financing and governance of the University of Basel.
