= Jacques Lefèvre d'Étaples =

French theologian and humanist (c. 1455–1536)

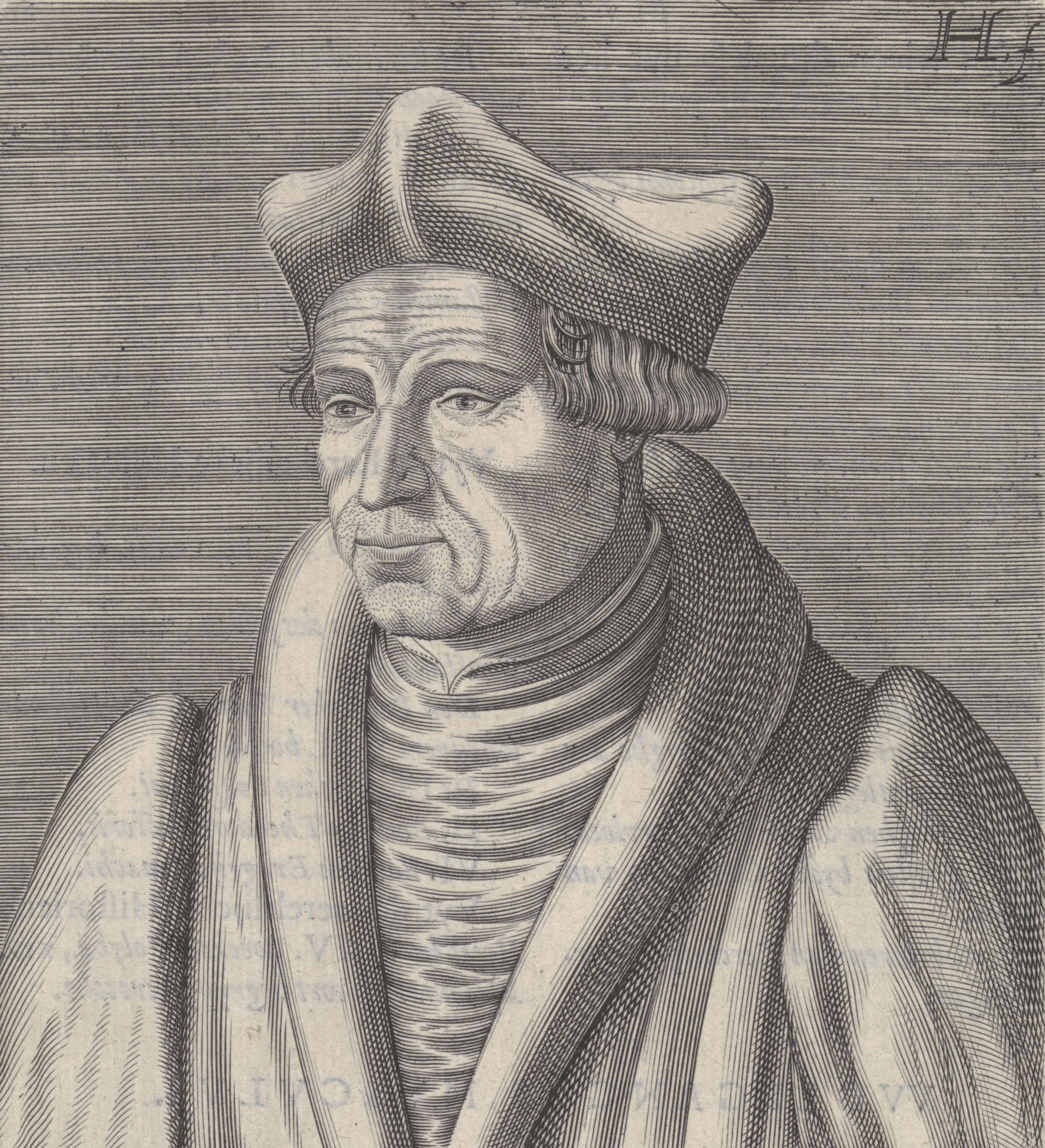
- Engraving by Hendrik Hondius I, 1602
- Born: c. 1455; Étaples, Picardy, Kingdom of France
- Died: c. 1536 (age approx. 81); Nérac, Guyenne, Kingdom of France
- Other name: Jacobus Faber Stapulensis

Academic work
- Era: Renaissance philosophy
- School or tradition: French humanism
- Main interests: Theology; Biblical translation; Philology; Music theory; Mathematics; Aristotelianism; Platonism

Jacques Lefèvre d'Étaples (French pronunciation: [ʒak ləfɛvʁ detapl]; Latinized as Jacobus Faber Stapulensis; c. 1455 – c. 1536) was a French theologian and a leading figure in French humanism. He was a precursor of the Protestant movement in France. The "d'Étaples" was not part of his name as such, but used to distinguish him from Jacques Lefèvre of Deventer, a less significant contemporary who was a friend and correspondent of Erasmus. Both are also sometimes called by the German version of their name, Jacob/Jakob Faber. He himself had a sometimes tense relationship with Erasmus, whose work on biblical translation and in theology closely paralleled his own.

Although he anticipated some ideas that were important to the Protestant Reformation, Lefèvre remained a Roman Catholic throughout his life, and sought to reform the Church without separating from it. Several of his books were condemned as heretical, and he spent some time in exile. He was, however, a favorite of the King of France, Francis I, and enjoyed his protection.

== Life ==
He was born of humble parents at Étaples, in Picardy, but appears later to have been possessed of considerable means. He had already been ordained a priest when he entered the University of Paris for higher education. Hermonymus of Sparta was his master in Greek.

He visited Italy before 1486, for he heard the lectures of John Argyropoulos, who died in that year; he formed a friendship with Paulus Aemilius of Verona. In 1492 he again travelled in Italy, studying in Florence, Rome and Venice, making himself familiar with the writings of Aristotle, though greatly influenced by the Platonic philosophy. Returning to the University of Paris, he became the director of the Collège du Cardinal Lemoine. Among his famous pupils were Beatus Rhenanus, François Vatable, Charles de Bovelles, and Guillaume Farel; his connection with the last drew him closer to the Calvinistic side of the movement of reform. Farel joined Lefèvre at Meaux to help in the training of preachers, before Farel left for Switzerland where he was one of the founders of the Reformed churches.

In 1507 he took up his residence in the Benedictine Abbey of St Germain des Prés, near Paris; this was due to his connection with the family of Briçonnet (one of whom was the superior), especially with Guillaume Briçonnet, cardinal bishop of Saint-Malo, father of Guillaume Briçonnet, the later bishop of Meaux. He now began to give himself to Biblical studies, the first-fruit of which was his Quintuplex Psalterium: Gallicum, Romanum, Hebraicum, Vetus, Conciliatum (1509); the Conciliatum was his own version. This was followed by S. Pauli Epistolae xiv. ex vulgata editione, adjecta intelligentia ex Graeco cum commentariis (1512), a work of great independence and judgment.

His De Maria Magdalena et triduo Christi disceptatio of 1517, which argued that Mary the sister of Lazarus, Mary Magdalene and the penitent woman who anointed Christ's feet were different people, provoked violent controversy and was condemned by the Sorbonne in 1521, and by Saint John Fisher. He had left Paris during the whole of 1520, and, removing to Meaux, was appointed vicar-general to Bishop Briçonnet on 1 May 1523; he published his French version of the New Testament later that year. This translation, contemporary with Luther's German version, has been the basis of all subsequent translations into French. From this, in the same year, he extracted the versions of the Gospels and Epistles "a l'usage du diocese de Meaux". The prefaces and notes to both these expressed the view that Holy Scripture is the only rule of doctrine, and that justification is by faith alone.

After he finished the translation of the New Testament into French, all copies were ordered to be burned and he went into exile.

He incurred much hostility, but was protected by Francis I and his intellectual sister Marguerite d'Angoulême. After Francis was taken captive at the battle of Pavia on 25 February 1525, Lefèvre was condemned and his works suppressed by commission of the parlement; these measures were quashed on the return of Francis some months later. He issued Le Psautier de David in 1525, and was appointed royal librarian at Blois in 1526; his version of the Pentateuch appeared two years later. His complete version of the Bible of 1530 was based on the Vulgate of Jerome, took the same place as his version of the New Testament. The publication and its revised edition based on the Hebrew and the Greek texts were printed by Merten de Keyser in Antwerp in 1534. Marguerite, now queen of Navarre, led him to take refuge from persecution in Nérac in 1531. He is said to have been visited in 1533 by John Calvin on his flight from France. He died in Nérac in about 1536.

== Works ==
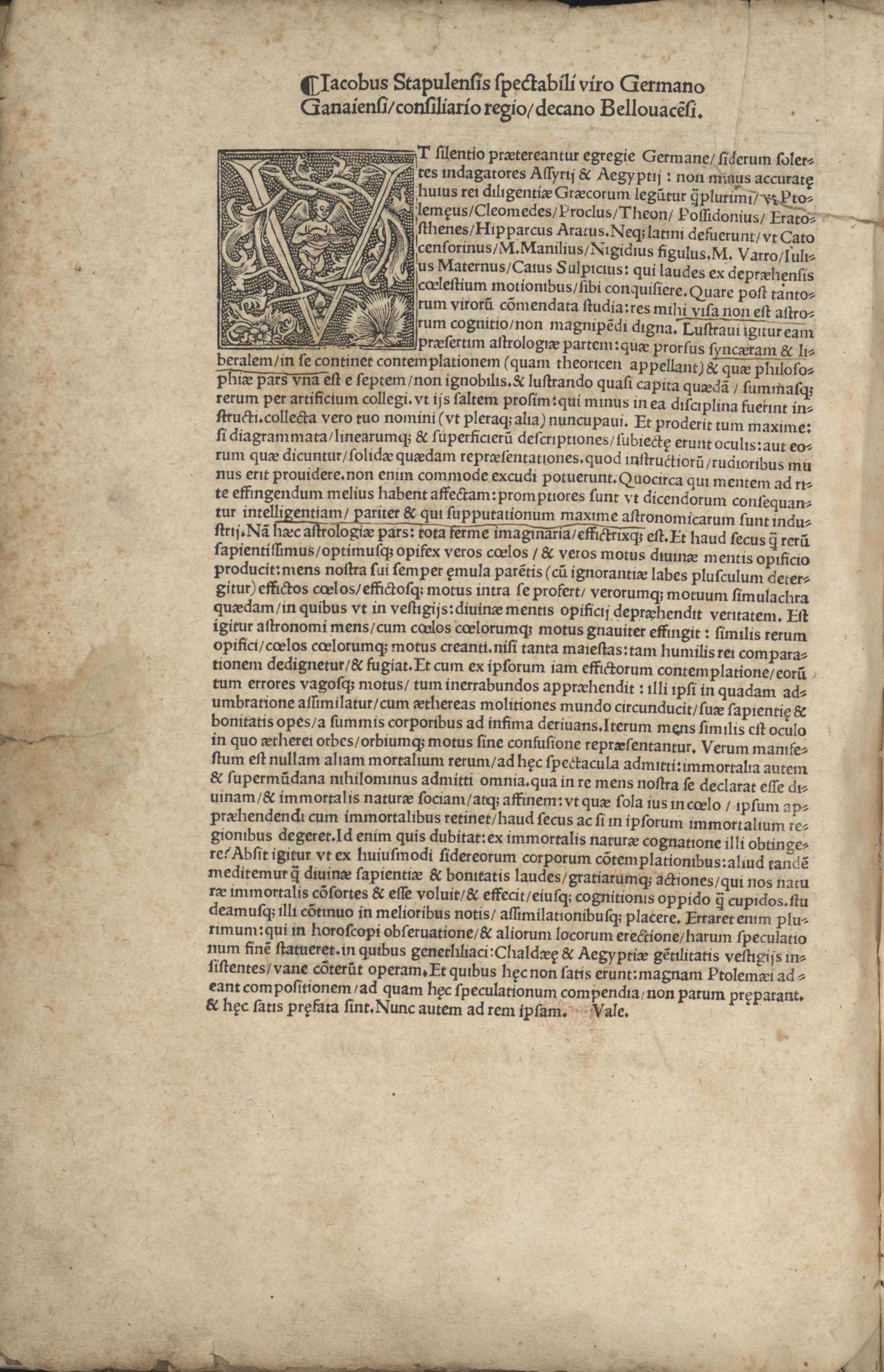
First page of the Introductorium astronomicum, 1517

Aristotelian works (selected)

- Paraphrases of the Whole of Aristotle's Natural Philosophy [Johannes Higman:] Parisii, 1492
- Introduction to the Metaphysics (1494)
- Introduction to the Nicomachean Ethics (1494)
- Logical Introductions (1496)
- Politics (1506)
- Introductorium astronomicum (in Latin). Paris: Henri Estienne (1.). 1517.

Boethius

The publication, with critical apparatus, of Boethius, De Arithmetica. Paris: Johannes Higman and Wolfgang Hopyl, 22 July 1496.

Biblical translations

He was a prolific translator of the Bible. He completed a translation of the Old Testament in 1528, and was famous for his French translation of the Psalms and the Pauline epistles, which he finished early in his career. His completed translation of the entire Christian Bible, published in 1530, was the first printed edition in the French language. It had been translated in manuscript form approximately 300 years previously as the "Old French Bible" or the "Bible du XIIIe Siècle."

- Psalterium quintuplex; gallicum, romanum, hebraicum, vêtus, conciliatum, 1509 and 1515, published by Henri Estienne, fol. with footnotes
- Commentaires sur saint Paul, avec une nouvelle traduction latine, Paris, 1512 and 1531. This work, in which one notices the lack of progress which had been made in criticism, was criticised by Erasmus for the grammatical section, and by Budé for the theological section, however this did not prevent it from being valued and studied
- Commentaires sur les Évangiles, Meaux, 1525; his doctrine appears here to be very orthodox on the points disputed by the innovators, although the syndic Beda reproached him for errors in this respect
- Commentaires sur les épîtres canoniques, Meaux, 1525; all his commentaries on the New Testament were put on the Index by the Roman inquisitors, under Pope Clement VIII. He distanced himself from ancient barbarism
- Traduction française du Nouveau Testament, Paris, Colines, 1523, 5 vols. 8vo, anonymous extremely rare, particularly the last volume. The translation was made from the Vulgate, because he intended it for the use of the faithful. It appeared again in his complete version of the Bible, Antwerp, fol.; later editions 1529 and 1532, 4 vol. 4to.; 1528, 4 vol. 8vo. The edition revised by the doctors of Louvain is the most correct and also the rarest because it was suppressed as was the edition of 1511. It is remarkable that while the Cordeliers of Meaux attacked Lefèvre because of his translations, those of Antwerp approved it in 1528, for printing and for sale. It is true that they did not have in their edition l'Épître exhortatoire, which principally displeased the doctors of Paris
- Exhortations en français sur les évangiles et les épîtres des dimanches, Meaux, 1525, condemned by the Parlement

Music theory

- Musica libris demonstrata quattuor, published together with Nemorarius, Arithmetica decem libris demonstrata and Boethius, De Arithmetica, Paris: Johannes Higman and Wolfgang Hopyl, 22 July 1496 Full text of 1551 edition

Other works

- Arithmetica decem libris demonstrata, the De elementis arithmetice artis of Jordanus Nemorarius (Jordanus de Nemore) with commentary and demonstrations, published together with Musica libris demonstrata quattuor and Boethius, De Arithmetica, Paris: Johannes Higman and Wolfgang Hopyl, 22 July 1496
- Traduction latine des livres de la foi orthodoxe de saint Jean de Damas; the first translation of this work
- De Maria Magdalena, 1517, followed in 1519 by another entitled: De tribus et unica Magdalena. This work is well done; the author retracts several points from the first work, for example his having said that these three women all bore the name of Magdalene
- Rithmimachie ludus, qui et pugna numerorum appellatur, Paris, Henri Estienne, 1514, 4to.; opusculum of five pages, printed at the end of the second edition of the Arithmetica of Jordanus Nemorarius. Here Lefèvre gives a very curious description of this ancient Pythagorean game, but with such little detail that cannot understand it properly except by joining it to the extended notice which Boissière gave to the same game
- The Opera omnia of Nicholas of Cusa, Paris, 1514

== See also ==
Other students

- Louis de Berquin
- Jacques Dubois
- Desiderius Erasmus
- Jan Szylling
