= Berquin =

Berquin may refer to:

places

- Neuf-Berquin, a French commune in Nord departement
- Vieux-Berquin, a French commune in Nord departement

people

- Arnaud Berquin (1747–1791), a French children's author
- Louis de Berquin (c. 1490–1529), a French lawyer, civil servant, linguist and reformer
