= Szylling =

Szylling is a Polish surname. Notable people with the surname include:

- Antoni Szylling (1884–1971), Polish general
- Jan Szylling (fl. early 16th century), Polish scholastic philosopher
