= Acts of reunion =

1815 acts joining former bishopric territories to Swiss cantons

Actes de réunion
Acts of Reunion
- Type: Territorial reunion agreements
- Signed: November 1815
- Location: Arlesheim and Bienne
- Effective: 1815
- Signatories: Canton of Bern, Canton of Basel, representatives of the former Prince-Bishopric of Basel

The Acts of Reunion (German: Vereinigungsurkunden) were two treaties concluded in November 1815 that regulated the incorporation into the cantons of Bern and Basel of territories from the former Prince-Bishopric of Basel. The Federal Diet granted its guarantee to these acts.

== Background ==
The Congress of Vienna had attributed the territories of the former Prince-Bishopric of Basel to Switzerland and divided them between Bern and Basel. In Article 3, paragraph 3 of the final document of 20 March 1815 concerning Switzerland, the Congress required that the terms of the reunion be negotiated by two joint commissions. The representatives of the former bishopric were chosen by the directorial canton, Zürich.

== Negotiations ==
One commission, consisting of three delegates from the Birseck and three representatives from Basel, negotiated in Arlesheim on 7 November 1815. The other commission was composed of seven representatives of the Bernese government and seven notable figures from the Jura. It discussed the twenty-five articles of the Act of Reunion with Bern from 3 to 14 November 1815 in Bienne.

== Content ==
Nine articles concerned the guarantee of the Catholic religion, addressing questions of the bishopric, religious education, the selection and remuneration of priests, and the pension of Prince-Bishop François Xavier de Neveu. Other articles dealt with the legal status of the Jurassians, religious freedom for the Anabaptists, the maintenance or abolition of French legislation, fiscal questions, and the special regime of the city of Bienne.

The Act of Reunion remained until the 20th century a source of discord in the Jura Question.
