= Janus Lascaris =

Greek scholar

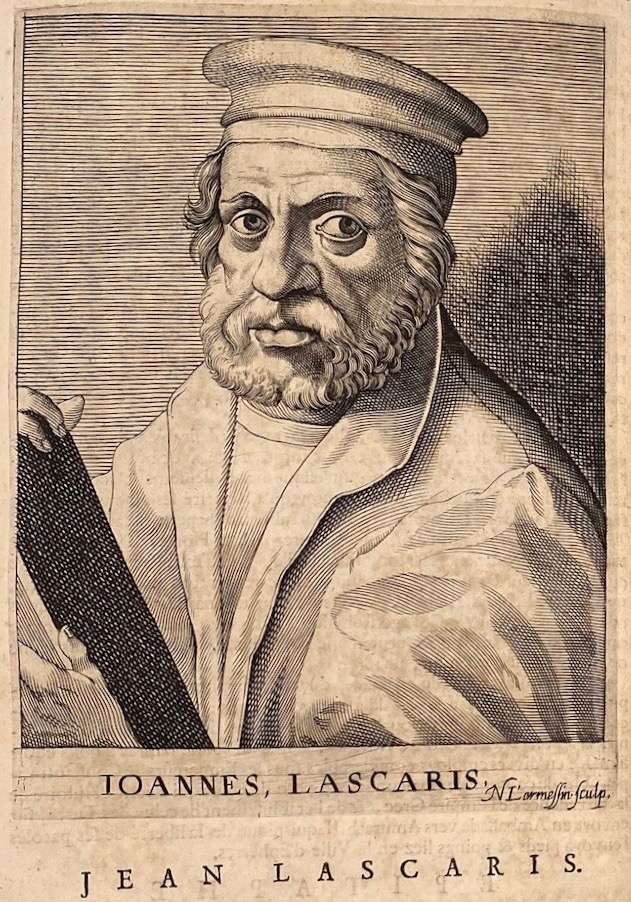
- Born: 1445; Constantinople, Byzantine Empire
- Died: 1534 (aged 88–89); Rome, Papal States
- Occupation: Scholar

Janus Lascaris (Greek: Ἰανὸς Λάσκαρις, Ianos Láskaris; c. 1445, Constantinople – 7 December 1535, Rome), also called John Rhyndacenus (from Rhyndacus, a country town in Asia Minor), was a noted Greek scholar in the Renaissance.

== Biography ==
After the Fall of Constantinople Lascaris was taken to the Peloponnese and to Crete. When still quite young he came to Venice, where Bessarion became his patron, and sent him to learn Latin at the University of Padua.

On the death of Bessarion, Lorenzo de' Medici welcomed him to Florence, where Lascaris gave Greek lectures on Thucydides, Demosthenes, Sophocles, and the Greek Anthology. Lorenzo sent him twice to Greece in quest of manuscripts. When he returned the second time (1492) he brought back about two hundred from Mount Athos.

Meanwhile, Lorenzo had died. Lascaris entered the service of the Kingdom of France and was ambassador of king Louis XII at Venice from 1503 to 1509. Upon the conclusion of the anti-Venetian League of Cambrai in December 1508, Lascaris was recalled from Venice and left the city in January 1509.

During his stay in Venice, he became a member of the New Academy of Aldus Manutius; but if the printer had the benefit of his advice, no Aldine work bears his name. He resided at Rome under Leo X, the first pope of the Medici family, from 1513 to 1518, returned under Clement VII in 1523, and Paul III in 1534.

In the meantime he had assisted Louis XII in forming the library of Blois, and when Francis I had it removed to Fontainebleau, Lascaris and Guillaume Budé had charge of its organization.

Lascaris prepared a number of editiones principes, among them the Anthologia Graeca (1494), four plays of Euripides, Callimachus (about 1495), Apollonius Rhodius, Lucian (1496), printed in Florence in Greek capitals with accents, the D-scholia (Rome 1517), the scholia of Porphyrius (1518) on Homer (Rome 1518), and the scholia vetera on Sophocles (Rome 1518).

Among his pupils were Alessandra Scala, Marco Musuro, Germain de Brie, Dimitrije Ljubavić, and Jacques Dubois.

He was buried in the gothic church of Sant'Agata de' Goti, Rome. On his memorial the following epigram is inscribed, composed by himself:

ΛΑΣΚΑΡΙΣ ΑΛΛΟΔΑΠΗ ΓΑΙΗ ΕΝΙΚΑΤΘΕΤΟ ΓΑΙΗΝ,

ΟΥΤΙ ΛΙΗΝ ΞΕΙΝΗΝ, Ω ΞΕΝΕ, ΜΕΜΦΟΜΕΝΟΣ.

ΕΥΡΕΤΟ ΜΕΙΛΙΧΙΗΝ. ΑΛΛ' ΑΧΘΕΤΑΙ ΕΙΠΕΡ ΑΧΑΙΟΙΣ.

ΟΥΔ' ΕΤΙ ΧΟΥΝ ΧΕΥΕΙ ΠΑΤΡΙΣ ΕΛΕΥΘΕΡΙΟΝ

Lascaris in foreign land deposited his earth [his body],

and he does not blame her [the land] that she is very foreign, oh stranger. He found her sweet. But he is worried about the Achaeans [the Greeks],

because their country does not cover them with free soil.

== See also ==
- French humanism
- Greek scholars in the Renaissance
- Greek community in Venice
- Laskaris family

== Sources ==
- This article incorporates text from a publication now in the public domain: Lejay, Paul (1910). "Janus Lascaris". In Herbermann, Charles (ed.). Catholic Encyclopedia. Vol. 9. New York: Robert Appleton Company.
- Chisholm, Hugh, ed. (1911). "Lascaris, Joannes" . Encyclopædia Britannica. Vol. 16 (11th ed.). Cambridge University Press.
- Harris, Jonathan, Greek Émigrés in the West, 1400-1520 (Camberley: Porphyrogenitus, 1995). ISBN 1-871328-11-X
- Kovtun, George J. “John Lascaris and the Byzantine Connection.” The Journal of Library History. 12, no. 1 (1977): 17–26.
- Setton, Kenneth M. (1984). The Papacy and the Levant (1204-1571). Vol. 3. Philadelphia: American Philosophical Society.
- Graham Speake, ‘Janus Lascaris’ visit to Mount Athos in 1491’, Greek, Roman and Byzantine Studies 34 (1993), 325–30.
- Walton, Francis. ‘Janus Laskaris’, The Griffon 10 (1984), 8-35
- Whittaker, J. ‘Janus Laskaris at the court of Charles V’, Thesaurismata 14 (1977), 76-109
- Wilson, N.G. From Byzantium to Italy. Greek Studies in the Italian Renaissance (London, 1992). ISBN 0-7156-2418-0
