= Marcus Musurus =

Greek scholar and philosopher (c. 1470-1517)

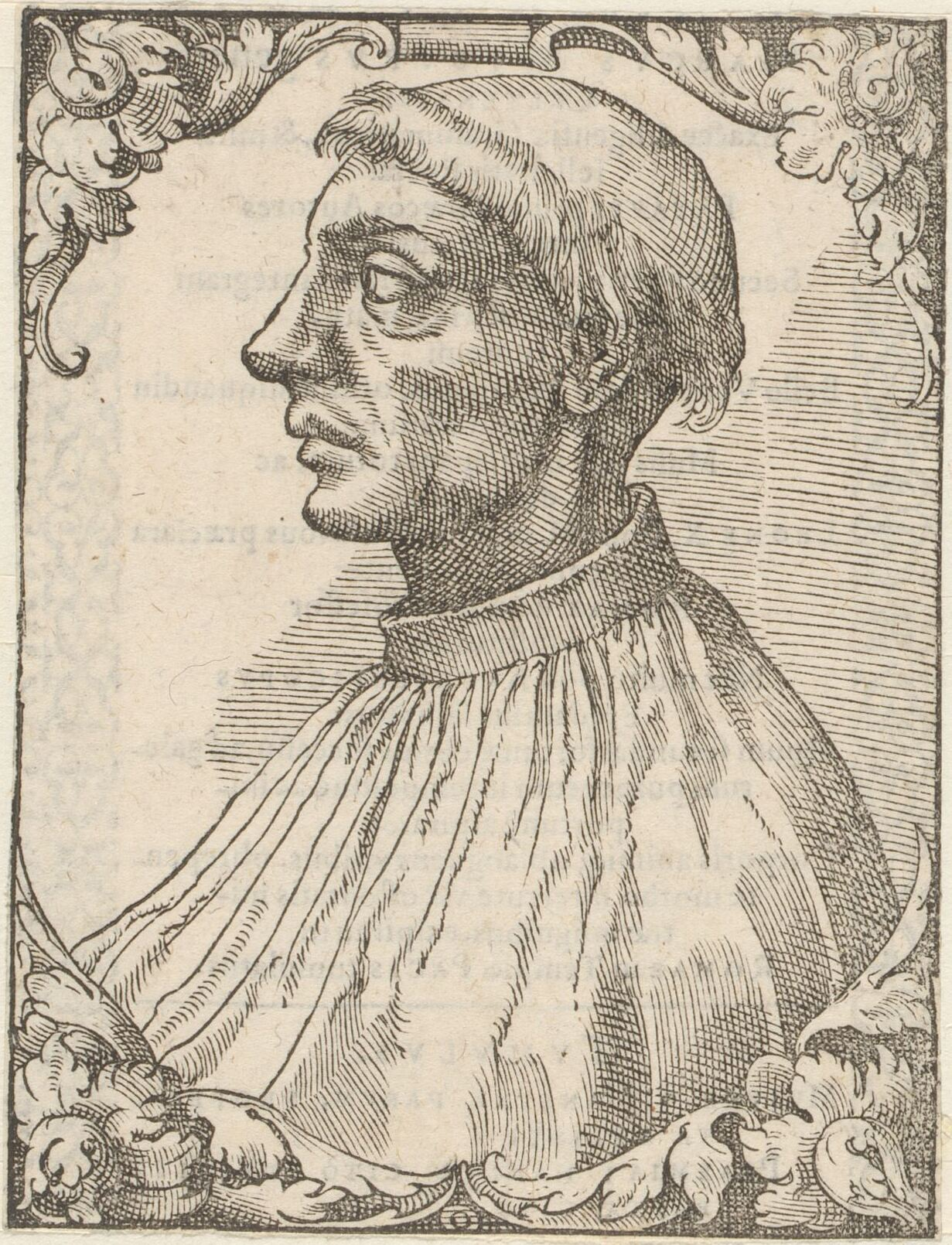
- Engraved portrait of Marcus Musurus by Tobias Stimmer
- Born: c. 1470; Kingdom of Candia, Venetian Crete (modern Heraklion, Crete)
- Died: 1517; Rome, Papal States

Academic background
- Academic advisor: Janus Lascaris

Academic work
- Notable students: Johannes Baptista Montanus
- Notable works: Dictionarium graecum copiosissimum, Etymologicum Magnum

Marcus Musurus (Greek: Μάρκος Μουσοῦρος, romanized: Markos Mousouros; Italian: Marco Musuro; c. 1470 – 1517) was a Greek scholar and philosopher born in Candia, Venetian Crete (modern Heraklion, Crete).

== Life ==
The son of a rich merchant, Musurus became at an early age a pupil of Janus Lascaris in Venice. In 1505, Musurus was made professor of Greek language at the University of Padua. Erasmus, who had attended his lectures there, testifies to his knowledge of Latin. However, when the university was closed in 1509 during the War of the League of Cambrai, he returned to Venice where he filled a similar post.

In 1512 he was made professor of Greek language in Venice: during this time he published through Aldus Manutius, a contemporary printer and publisher, his edition on Plato. This was the first time that the Dialogues were printed in Greek.

In 1516, Musurus was summoned to Rome by Pope Leo X, where he lectured in the pope's Greek College of the Quirinal (Gymnasium) and established a Greek printing-press. In recognition of a Greek poem prefixed to the editio princeps of Plato, Leo appointed him archbishop of Monemvasia (Malvasia) in the Peloponnese, but he died before he left the Italian Peninsula.

From 1493, Musurus was associated with the famous printer Aldus Manutius and belonged to the Neacademia (Aldine Academy of Hellenists), a society founded by Manutius and other learned men for the promotion of Greek studies. Many of the Aldine classics were published under Musurus' supervision, and he is credited with the first editions of the scholia of Aristophanes (1498), Athenaeus (1514), Hesychius of Alexandria (1514) and Pausanias (1516). Musuros' handwriting reportedly formed the model of Aldus' Greek type. Among his original compositions Musurus wrote a dedicatory epigram for Zacharias Kallierges' edition of the Etymologicum Magnum, in which he praised the genius of the Cretans.

Musurus died in Rome.

== See also ==
- Byzantine scholars in Renaissance
