= Melchior von Lichtenfels =

Melchior von Lichtenfels (c.1517–1575) was the Prince-Bishop of Basel from the year 1554 to 1575.

Von Lichtenfels was born into a noble Württemberg family around the year 1517. In 1527, he became a member of the cathedral chapter of the Basel Münster. He was archdeacon from 1547 to 1554.

Following the 1553 death of Philippe von Gundelsheim, Lichtenfels became apostolic administrator of the prince-bishopric. In 1554, the cathedral chapter elected him as the new Prince-Bishop of Basel.

He died in Porrentruy on 17 May 1575.

Catholic Church titles
| Preceded by Philippe von Gundelsheim | Prince-Bishop of Basel; 1554–1575 | Succeeded by Jakob Christoph Blarer von Wartensee |
