= Hugo von Hohenlandenberg =

- Bishop of Konstanz
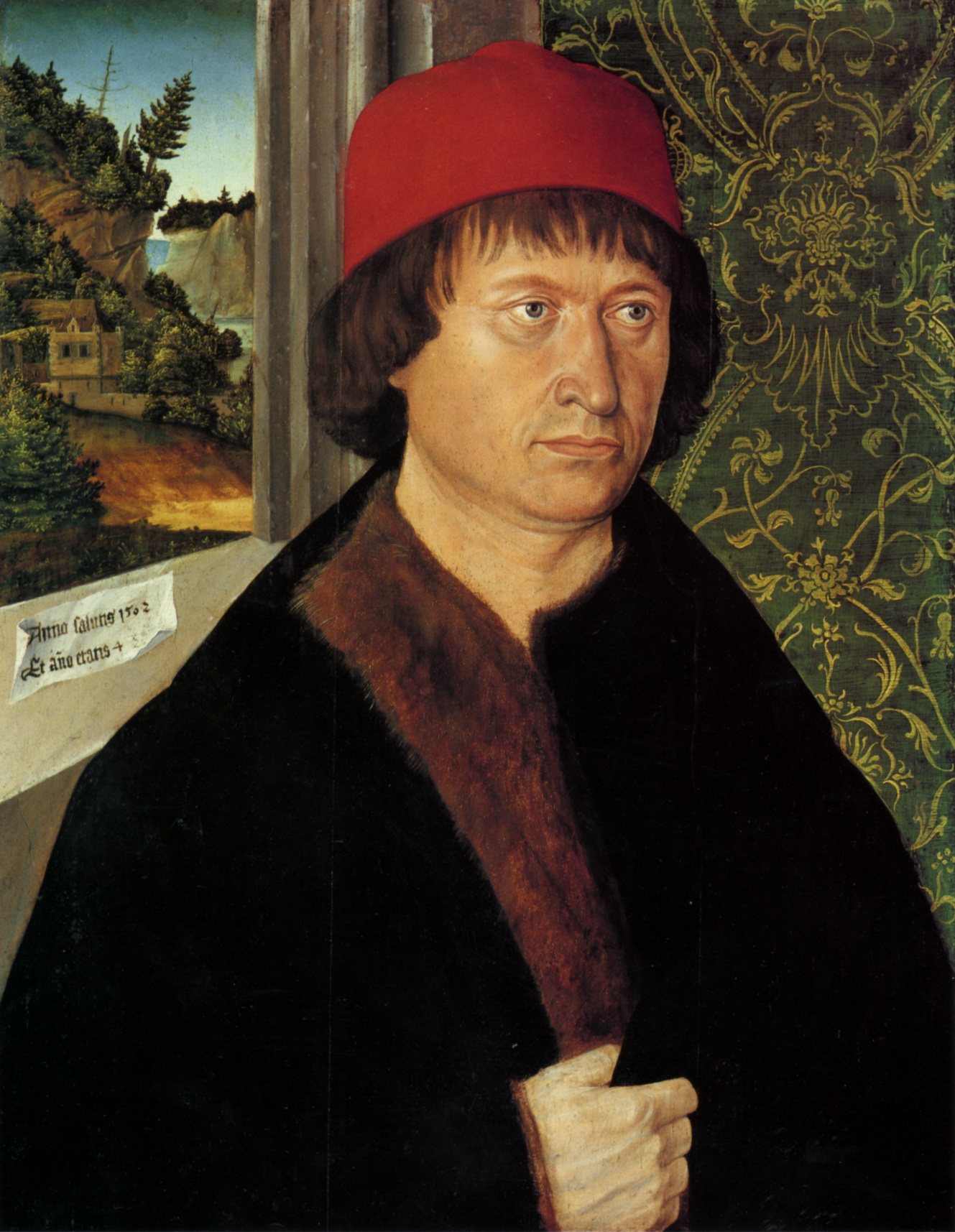
- Installed: 1496; 1531
- Term ended: 1529; 1532
- Predecessor: Thomas Berlower
- Successor: Balthasar Merklin

Orders
- Ordination: 18 Dec 1496 by Berthold von Henneberg

Personal details
- Born: 1457 Winterthur, Switzerland
- Died: 7 January 1532 (aged 74–75) Meersburg, Germany
- Denomination: Roman Catholic

Hugo von Hohenlandenberg (c. 1457 in Schloss Hegi bei Winterthur [Zurich] – 7 January 1532 in Meersburg, Germany) was Bishop of Konstanz from 1496 to 1529, and again in 1530 and 1531 until his death in 1532.

== Biography ==
Hugo von Landenberg was born around the year 1457 in Oberwinterthur, near Zurich. He was born into a wealthy aristocratic family, which owned estates near Zurich. Like many younger sons from aristocratic families, Hugo entered the Church early in life.

His first known Church position came in 1484 when he was appointed provost of Saint Mary's at Erfurt. He was later a canon at Basel, Constanz, and Chur from 1486 until 1492, when he was promoted to deacon. The cities are on the border of modern Germany and Switzerland.

In October 1496, he was elected by the Cathedral Chapter of Konstanz as the new bishop of the diocese. He was installed as bishop in Konstanz on 18 December 1496.

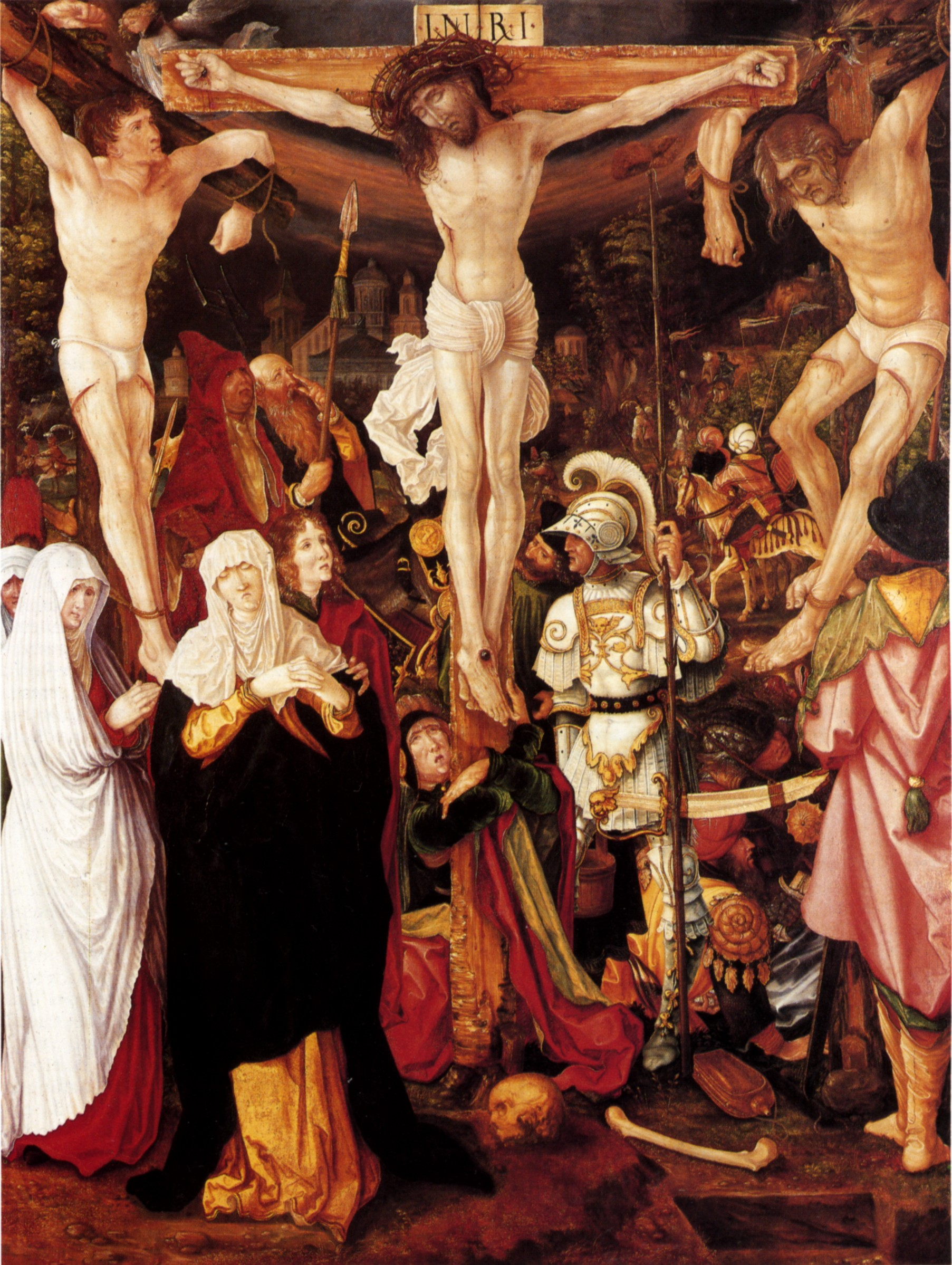
Central image of the Bockstorfer Altar, Cathedral of Konstanz. Painted by Christoph Bockstorfer (?) in 1524.

At first he facilitated reforms in his diocese, and did not interfere with the spread of Reformation ideas. Hugo was in agreement with the reformer Zwingli on a number of topics, particularly on indulgences, until the latter began speaking out against other deeply entrenched church practices, such as the prohibition on eating meat during Lent. After the publication of Zwingli's works, Apologetic vs Archeteles Adpellat vs (Zürich, 1522), and a petition arguing against the need for priestly celibacy, Hugo's opinions shifted dramatically. His response came swiftly in a short work defending the Church's position on celibacy, entitled "Ernstliche Ermanung des Fridensund Christenlicher Einigkeit des durchlüchtigen Fürsten unnd genädigenHerren Hugonis vo[n] Landenberg Bischoff tzu Costantz mitt Schönerusslegung unnd erklärung, vast trostlich unnd nutzlich zu lässen, nüwlich ussgangen" ((Augsburg), 1522/23).

The irony of this story is that, according to the canon of Constanz, Johann von Botzheim, Hugo was romantically involved with a mayor's daughter. To cover this information and discredit its source, the bishop initiated an investigation of Botzheim for heresy for his reformist beliefs. Despite his best efforts, Hugo lost his battle against the rising tide of the Reformation as the Constanz reform movement steadily grew, and in 1526, Hugo and his chapter moved from the city to his castle at Meersburg, leaving the city to the followers of Martin Luther and Zwingli.

He resigned his see on 5 January 1529, but resumed his duties near the end of his life due to the untimely death of his successor to the see, Balthasar Merklin.

Hugo von Hohenlandenberg can be grouped with contemporary Bishops of the Catholic Church such as Guillaume Briçonnet and Christoph von Utenheim who attempted, unsuccessfully, to reform the Church along evangelical lines without compromising ecclesiastical unity.

== Art patronage ==
Note: This is directly translated from the German Wikipedia article, without verification of translation

We owe the following significant works of art to Hugo von Hohenlandenberg:

- The so-called Hohenlandenberg Altar, circa 1500. Today, this triptych is in the Staatliche Kunsthalle Karlsruhe. Ont its left panel, it depicts St Conrad with the kneeling figure of the bishop as donor, though without resemblance to his appearance. On the right panel, it depicts St Pelagius, and in the center, a crucifixion before a backdrop of an idealized city. The artist of the late medieval oil on wood paintings is to be regarded as Michel Haider.
- The so-called Bockstorf Altar, 1524, Chapel of St Conrad, Cathedral of Constance. The artist was long thought to have been Christoph Bockstorfer. Today, Matthaeus Gutrecht the Younger with some work by Philipp Memberger is considered more likely. The altar was the only survival of the iconoclasm of the Reformation, because it stood in the Bishop's Palace and not in the cathedral. The triptych shows the diocesan saints Conrad and Pelagius on the right and left panels, respectively, and on the center panel, a richly populated crucifixion scene.
- Hugo is also recorded as donor on a predella with a scene of the burial of Christ (circa 1515). This predella was located in the Fürstenberg collections at Donaueschingen and was sold to Reinhold Würth in 2003, with the majority of the older German pictures.
- Latin Missal illustrated with miniatures, originally in 4 volumes. This is one of the most valuable works of the Renaissance and one of the most outstanding pieces of South German illustration; it was illustrated by two artists: Hans Springinklee the Elder (of Nuremberg) (volumes 1 and 3) and Ulrich Taler (of Augsburg) (volumes 2 and 4). It survived the Reformation largely undamaged, in the bishop's private possession. Volumes 2–4 are in the archiepiscopal archive in Freiburg im Breisgau (Cod. Da 42, 2–4); the first volume was sold as single sheets in 1832.

Construction of the central tower of the Cathedral of Constance began in 1497 under Bishop von Hohenlandenberg; however, after a fire in 1511, the construction remained unfinished. In 1515, he contracted for a new organ and an artfully carved organ loft.

Beginning in 1508, the bishop had Burg Meersburg enlarged and converted into an episcopal residence. He also had Schloss Arbon, in Arbon, considerably enlarged.

Catholic Church titles
Preceded by Thomas Berlower	Prince-Bishop of Constance; 1496–1529; 1531/2	Succeeded by Balthasar Merklin
