= Robert Briçonnet =

French churchman and courtier

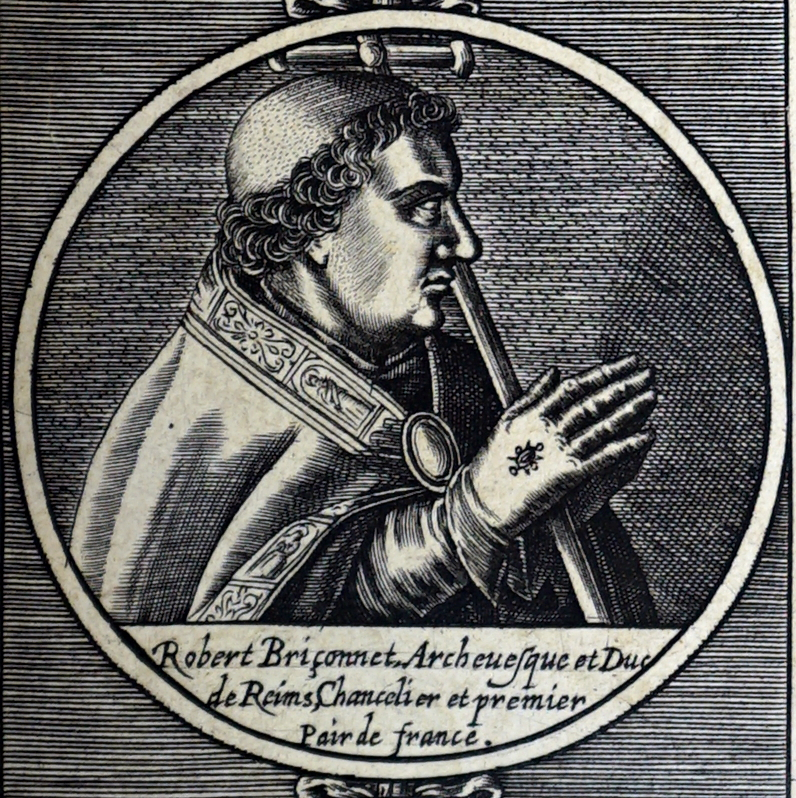

Robert Briçonnet (c.1450 – 3 June 1497) was a French churchman and courtier, and Archbishop of Reims from 1493.

== Life ==
He was the fifth son of Jean Briçonnet, and an elder brother of the Cardinal Guillaume Briçonnet. He owed much to the credit which Guillaume had with Charles VIII of France, when it came to his rapid elevation to public offices and dignities.

He was named Canon of St.-Aignan at Orléans, Abbot of the rich Abbey of St. Vaast at Arras, and in 1493 he was raised to the archiepiscopal See of Reims, four years before the Cardinal himself was appointed to that see.

Charles also appointed him President of the Superior Tribunal of Finances, and Chancellor of France. He enjoyed this new dignity for only twenty-two months before his death, which occurred at Moulins. He showed himself, as did his brothers and nephews, a patron of men of letters.
