= Jacques Dubois =

French anatomist (1478 – 1555)

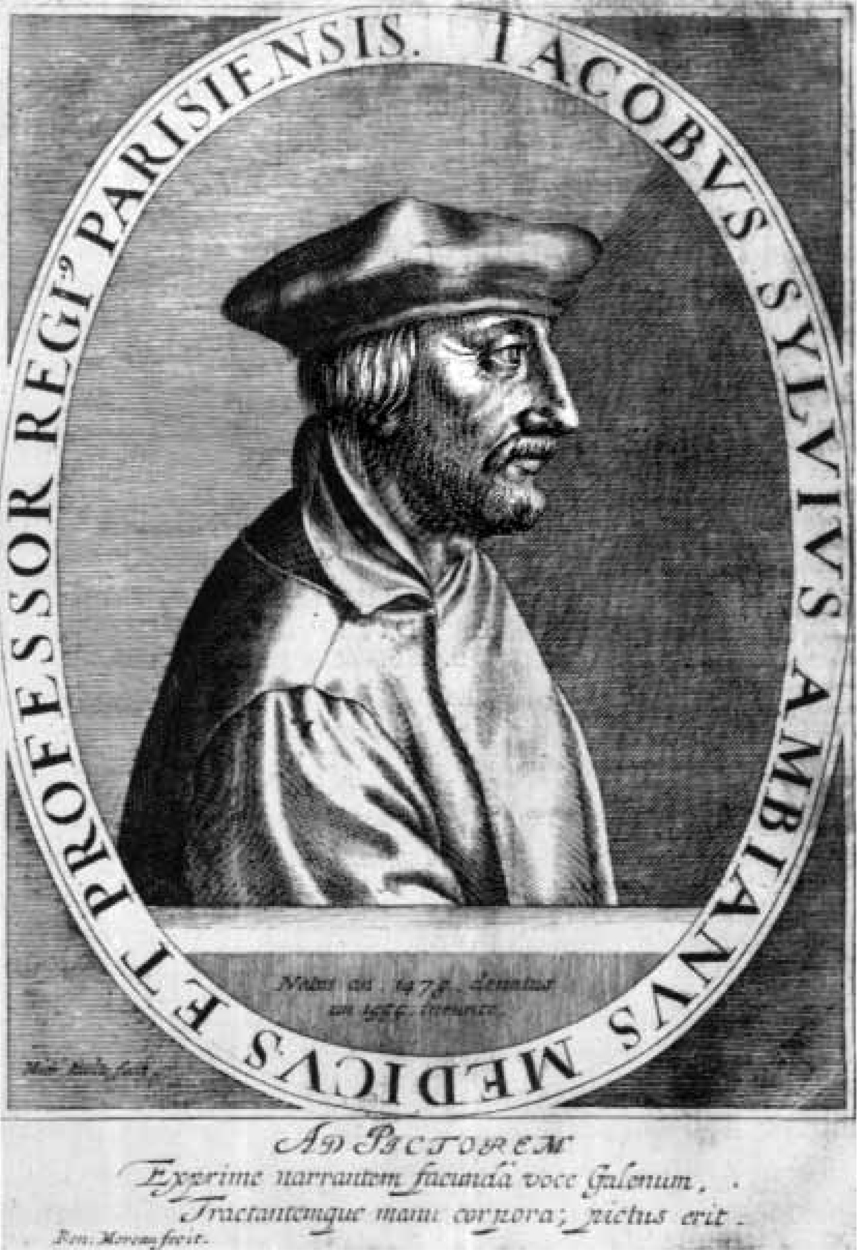
- Born: 1478; Loeuilly, France
- Died: 14 January 1555 (aged 76–77); Paris, France
- Other name: Jacobus Sylvius
- Education: University of Montpellier (M.B., 1529; M.D., 1530)
- Scientific career
- Fields: Anatomy, surgery
- Institutions: Collège de Tréguier; Collège Royal
- Academic advisors: Hermonymus of Sparta; Janus Lascaris; Jacques Lefèvre d'Étaples; Jean Tagault; François Vatable
- Notable students: Louis Duret; Michael Servetus; Andreas Vesalius

Jacques Dubois (Latinised as Jacobus Sylvius; 1478 – 14 January 1555) was a French anatomist who was professor of surgery at Collège Royal. He was the first to describe venous valves, although their function was later discovered by William Harvey.

He was the brother of Franciscus Sylvius Ambianus (François Dubois; c. 1483 – 1536), professor of humanities at the Collège de Tournai of the University of Paris.

== First years ==
The origins of this anatomist are vague. He was probably born in 1478 in Loeuilly, a small town near Amiens, the seventh in a family of fifteen. His father had been a weaver. At a young age he studied Ancient Greek with Hermonymus of Sparta and Janus Lascaris, Hebrew with François Vatable, and mathematics with Jacques Lefèvre d'Étaples, and gradually became a leading figure in French humanism, where he was famous for his excellent knowledge of these disciplines.

== Early grammar of French ==
Dubois was the author of the first grammar of the French language to be published in France. The title of this work was In linguam gallicam isagωge, una cum eiusdem Grammatica latino-gallica, ex hebræis, græcis et latinis authoribus [Introduction to the French language, with a Latin-French grammar of the same, based on Hebrew, Greek and Latin authors], published in Paris in early 1531, less than a year after the very first French grammar, by John Palsgrave, was published in London.

== From philosophy to medicine ==
Dubois was known for his hard work, and eloquence. He studied languages and mathematics at the University of Paris; but feeling that the rewards were inadequate, Dubois abandoned scholarship for medicine. He acquired his anatomical knowledge thanks to Jean Fagault, a famous physician of Paris and also dean of the Faculty of Medicine. While studying under Fagault, Dubois began his career as a professor with a course explaining the work of Hippocrates and Galen. These lessons concerned anatomy and were taught at the Collège de Tréguier (in Tréguier). The success of his lectures turned out to be so remarkable that the faculty of the University of Paris protested that he had not yet obtained a college degree. For this reason Sylvius went to the University of Montpellier, where he enrolled in November 1529. He received his M.B. in 1529 and his M.D. from Montpellier in 1530.

Once he obtained his degree he returned to Paris, but he was again blocked by the Faculty, which decreed that the anatomist should have obtained an M.B. from the University of Paris before returning to his lessons. On 28 June 1531 Sylvius incorporated an M.B. at Paris and was able to resume its course in anatomy. In 1550, when Vidus Vidius departed for Italy, he was appointed to succeed him as Professor of Surgery in charge of the new Collège Royal in Paris. This appointment was granted by Henry II of Valois.

Sylvius was an admirer of Galen, and interpreted the anatomical and physiological writings of that author in preference to giving demonstrations from the subject. He died on 14 January 1555 in Paris.

== Sylvius as a teacher ==
Sylvius was not only an eloquent professor, but also a demonstration teacher. He was the first professor to teach anatomy of a human corpse, in France.

His biggest intellectual flaw was his blind reverence for the ancient authors. He treated the writings of Galen as if they were wholly sacred, he would believe that if a corpse showed structures different from those described by Galen, the error was not in the texts, but in the corpse, or the structure of the human body that had changed over the centuries. In one of his works, "Ordo et Ratio Ordinis Legendis Hippocratis et Galeni Libris", Sylvius says that the anatomy of Galen was infallible, that his treatise De Usu Partium was divine and that further progress in anatomy would have been impossible.

Andreas Vesalius, who was his (frustrated) pupil, states that his manner of teaching was calculated neither to advance the science nor to rectify the mistakes of his predecessors. A human body was never seen in Dubois' anatomical theatre. The carcasses of dogs and other animals were the materials from which he taught. It was so difficult to obtain human bones, that Vesalius and his fellow-students had to collect them themselves from the Cimetière des Innocents and other cemeteries. Without these, they must have committed numerous errors in acquiring the first principles.

Though Jean Riolan (1577–1657) contradicted these comments and accused Vesalius of ingratitude, it is certain that the frustrations that Vesalius experienced were the basis for which he later traveled to Padua and became a famous anatomist himself. Only in Italy were the opportunities of inspecting the human body frequent enough as to facilitate the study of the science. Charles Estienne also attacked his old teacher and assured that Sylvius was greedy. Some other pupils of Sylvius defended his teaching and work, specially Louis Vasse and Michel de Villeneuve, the latter being considered by Johann Winter von Andernach (colleague and friend of Sylvius) the best galenist of Paris and second anatomist after Vesalius. Louis Vassé denounced the attacks of Vesalius and Estienne, and affirmed they had learnt all they knew by Sylvius' lessons. Vasse explains the nature of Sylvius' influence over his unruly audience this way:

"This depended not so much on his splendid use of the Latin tongue as upon the exceptional clarity of his thought. He was, moreover, never tired of teaching and so taught that none of his students ever tired of learning. He had an astonishing power of enabling them to grasp and see quite clearly that which a moment before had seemed impenetrable and terribly involved."

This period was a time of fierce debate between Galenists and the new body of thought on anatomy. The conservative Riolan attacked William Harvey with equal fervour.

== Contributions to anatomy ==
Sylvius made a valuable service by giving a name to the muscles, which until then had simply been referred to by numbers. These numbers were arbitrarily assigned by different authors. He was the first anatomist to publish descriptions of satisfactory pterygoid process and the sphenoid bone and clinoid bone tear. He gave a good description of the sphenoid sinus in an adult, but denied its existence in children. Sylvius also wrote about the vertebrae, but described incorrectly the sternum. Although the cerebral aqueduct (Aqueduct of Sylvius) and Sylvian (lateral) sulcus of the brain have been said to be his contributions to anatomy, the aqueduct was described by Galen nearly 1300 years before, albeit the name aqueduct in this context was first mentioned by another Sylvius (Franciscus Sylvius, 1614–1672), who apparently also described the sulcus which bears his name.
