= Christoph von Utenheim =

Bishop of Basel from 1502 to 1527

Christoph von Utenheim (c. 1450-1527) was Bishop of Basel from 1502 until his resignation from that office in 1527.

== Biography ==
Christoph von Utenheim was born to a noble family in Lower Alsace, about the year 1450. He studied theology and canon law at the University of Basel and the University of Erfurt. In either 1473 or 1474 he became the rector of Basel University. He earned his doctorate in theology in 1475. The cathedral chapter of Basel elected von Utenheim as its new bishop on 1 December 1502.

While many bishops in the empire treated their office as a way to aggrandize the power and wealth of their particular family, von Utenheim appeared to take his spiritual duties as bishop seriously. His motto was "Spes mea crux Christi; gratiam, non opera quaero" which translates to "The cross of Christ is my hope; I seek mercy, not works". This profession was also the motto of Jean Gerson, the 15th century French theologian and conciliarist.

Von Utenhiem may have had some conciliarist sympathies but subsequent actions paint him as more of a humanist than anything else. In 1503 the new bishop called together a synod for the purposes of reforming his diocese. The noted humanist scholar Jacob Wimpfeling was invited by the bishop to attend this synod. Any attempts at actual reform in the diocese of Basel however were halted because of the refusal of the cathedral chapter to cooperate with the reforming bishop.

This early failure to correct abuses in his diocese did not discourage von Utenheim from reformist enterprises however. He continued his attempts to regenerate the life of his clergy. At one point the reforming bishop "warned his clergy not to curl their hair with curling-tongs, nor to carry on trade in the churches, or to raise a disturbance there, not to keep drinking booths or to engage in horse-dealing, and not to buy stolen property." In 1515 he invited Johannes Oecolampadius to serve as his cathedral preacher at Basel Münster. While serving under Bishop von Utenheim, Oecolampadius demonstrated his reforming fervor when he criticized the introduction of humorous stories into Easter sermons. Later an important figure in the Reformation, Oecolampadius served as preacher in the Cathedral of Basel until his resignation in 1520.

By the time Oecolampadius left Basel in 1520 the Reformation was already underway. Throughout the 1520s von Utenheim held on as bishop in Basel as the Reformation, a movement which increasingly ignored established episcopal authority, steadily gained momentum in the city. On 26 January 1524 the beleaguered von Utenheim, along with the bishops of Lausanne and Konstanz, complained at the Diet of Luzerne of the deteriorization of ecclesiastical unity. A program of reform for the three bishoprics was laid out at the Diet but was never enacted.

This slow decline in the bishop's authority continued and culminated in his resignation on 19 February 1527. Von Utenheim relocated to the town of Pruntrut along with his cathedral chapter. He died shortly after leaving Basel and his burial took place in Delsberg. In retrospect von Utenheim can be grouped with contemporary bishops of the Catholic Church such as Guillaume Briçonnet and Hugo von Hohenlandenberg who attempted, unsuccessfully, to reform the Church along evangelical lines without breaking up ecclesiastical unity.

Catholic Church titles
Preceded by Caspar von Mühlhausen	Prince-Bishop of Basel; 1502–1527	Succeeded by Philippe von Gundelsheim
