= Guillaume Briçonnet (bishop of Meaux) =

French bishop (1470–1534)

The Most Reverend Guillaume Briçonnet
- Bishop of Meaux
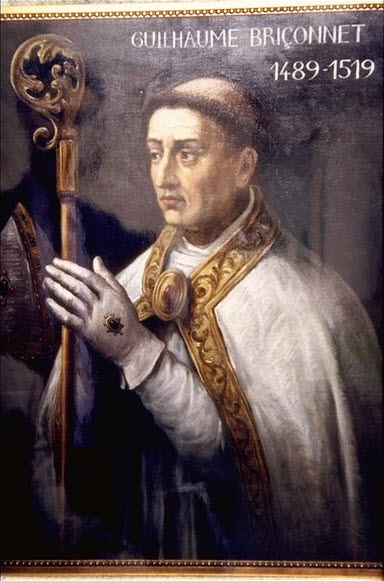
- Church: Roman Catholic
- Appointed: 31 December 1515
- Term ended: 24 January 1534
- Predecessor: Louis Pinelle
- Successor: Antoine Duprat

Personal details
- Born: c. 1472
- Died: 24 January 1534 Esmans, France

Guillaume Briçonnet (French pronunciation: [ɡijom bʁisɔnɛ]; c. 1472 – 24 January 1534) was the Bishop of Meaux from 1516 until his death in 1534.

== Biography ==
Briçonnet was born into a wealthy aristocratic family about the year 1472. His father was Guillaume Briçonnet (1445–1514) who had already enjoyed a successful career in the Catholic Church. The influence that the elder Guillaume Briçonnet exercised certainly did not hinder his son and namesake from advancing up through the Church hierarchy. The younger Briçonnet was made Bishop of Lodève in 1489 and was later installed as the abbot of the Abbey of Saint-Germain-des-Prés in 1507. Briçonnet also had political connections to the royal court court and attended the consecration of King Louis XII. In 1516 he was commissioned by King Francis I of France to negotiate with Pope Leo X on the terms of the Concordat of Bologna. In the same year Briçonnet was chosen as the new Bishop of Meaux where he would begin the most significant part of his career.

As Bishop, Briçonnet began to implement a program of reform in his diocese. He worked to improve the training of his clergy as well as improving monastic discipline. In Meaux, he removed all church statues except for Christ, replaced the Hail Mary with the Pater Noster prayer, and made available vernacular French versions of the Gospels and Epistles.

In the course of these efforts however he made some enemies, particularly among the Franciscan friars within his diocese. In 1521 Briçonnet invited a number of evangelical humanists to work in the bishopric to help implement his reform program. This group of humanists became known as the Circle of Meaux and included Josse van Clichtove, Guillaume Farel, Jacques Lefèvre d'Étaples, Martial Mazurier, Gérard Roussel, and François Vatable. The members of the Meaux circle were of different talents but they generally emphasized the study of the Bible and a return to the theology of the early Church.

Although Briçonnet supported a renewal of his diocese along humanist lines with the support of evangelical reformers, the bishop never supported and later condemned the growing Reformation movement centered on Martin Luther. Certain members of the group disagreed with the bishop in their attitude towards Lutheranism however. The support of Lutheranism by some of his subordinates cast suspicion on Briçonnet's entire project. Some of the Franciscan friars in his diocese, already unhappy with the Bishop's austere method, took the opportunity offered by this suspicion and accused him of Lutheranism. Briçonnet had to appear before the Parlement of Paris to face charges of heresy. Briçonnet was found innocent by the Parlement, possible because of his connections at the royal court in Paris. Permanent damage had been done to Briçonnet's reform efforts however, and he found it impossible to continue his attempt to regenerate the spiritual life of his diocese. The Circle of Meaux disbanded about 1525. Its members went various ways, some of them later playing important roles in the Reformation.

After the breakup of the Circle of Meaux Briçonnet served for another nine years as bishop before his death, dismayed at the growing reaction in the Catholic Church against all attempts at internal reform that smacked of possible heresy. In retrospect Briçonnet can be grouped with contemporary Bishops of the Catholic Church such as Christoph von Utenheim and Hugo von Hohenlandenberg who attempted, unsuccessfully, to reform the Church along evangelical lines without breaking up ecclesiastical unity.

Guillaume Briçonnet died at Esmans castle on 24 January 1534. He is buried in the church of this town.

== Family ==
He was one of five children; his brother Denis became Bishop of Toulon, Lodève and Saint-Malo.
