= Louis de Berquin =

Louis de Berquin (c. 1490 – 17 April 1529) was a French lawyer, civil servant, linguist, lapidary, and Protestant reformer in the 16th century. He was burned at the stake as a heretic in April 1529 for refusing to recant his beliefs.

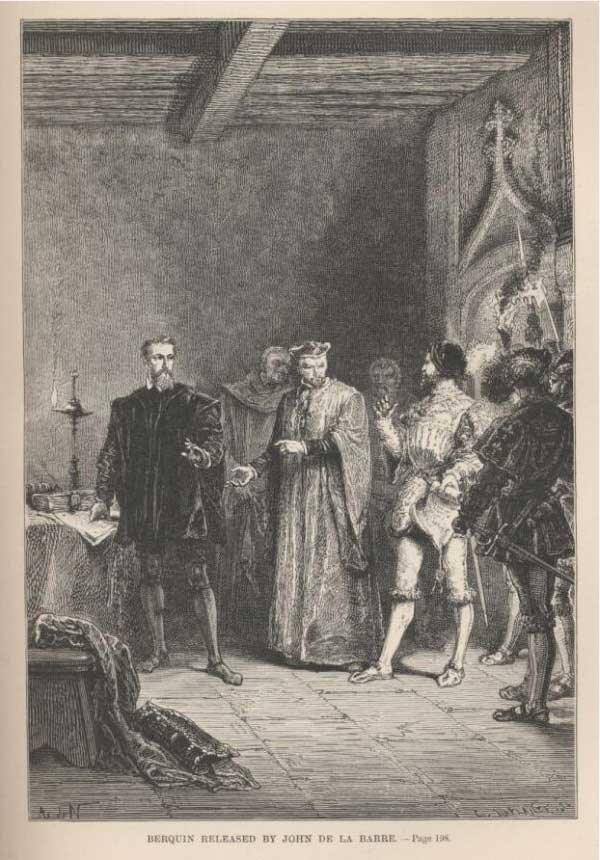
Louis de Berquin (left) released from prison by John de la Barre

== Life and work ==
Berquin was born of noble family around 1490 in Vieux-Berquin. Coming into contact with Christian humanists such as Erasmus and Jacques Lefèvre d'Étaples he began to study the Bible for himself and to advocate reform of the French Catholic Church from within. He desired to free France from the power of the pope. His writings aroused fierce opposition among traditional scholars. However, King Francis I and his sister Marguerite of Valois intervened in his behalf.

Marguerite especially defended him, writing to the constable, Anne de Montmorency after Berquin was released from one arrest, "I thank you for the pleasure you have afforded me in the matter of poor Berquin whom I esteem as much as if he were myself; and so you may say you have delivered me from prison, since I consider in that light the favor done me." In a letter to Erasmus, Berquin accused the divinity professors of Sorbonne of impiety. On the 16 of April, 1529, the French Parliament condemned him to watch as his books were burned, to have his tongue pierced, and then to be imprisoned without reading material for life. When Berquin refused, even by silence, to condone the condemnation of truth, he was returned to prison. The next day, 17 April 1529, he was brought out and burned at the stake. All his original works are lost, only a few of his Erasmus translations remain.

A Protestant controversialist has written:

Louis de Berquin was of noble birth. A brave and courtly knight, he was devoted to study, polished in manners, and of blameless morals. 'He was,' says a writer, 'a great follower of the papistical constitutions, and a great hearer of masses and sermons;... and he crowned all his other virtues by holding Lutheranism in special abhorrence.' But, like so many others, providentially guided to the Bible, he was amazed to find there 'not the doctrines of Rome, but the doctrines of Luther.' Henceforth he gave himself with entire devotion to the cause of the gospel.

== Sources ==
- McNeil, David O. (1975). Guillaume Budé and Humanism in the Reign of Francis I. Librairie Droz.
- Thompson, Bard (1996). Humanists and Reformers: A History of the Renaissance and Reformation. Wm. B. Erdmans Publishing Co.476
