= Philippe von Gundelsheim =

Philippe von Gundelsheim (1487–1553) was the Prince-Bishop of Basel from 1527 to 1553.

== Biography ==
Philippe von Gundelsheim was born in 1487. He studied at Heidelberg University (1503) and the University of Basel (1504–05). He became a canon of the Basel Münster in 1510.

On 28 February 1527 the cathedral chapter of Basel Münster, meeting at Delémont, elected him to be the new Prince-Bishop of Basel, with Pope Clement VII confirming his appointment on 31 August 1527. He was consecrated as a bishop on 31 December 1527.

In 1529, the city of Basel became Protestant under the leadership of Johannes Oecolampadius. In 1530, Laufental rebelled against the bishop, but were suppressed using forces from Solothurn. Because of insolvency, the prince-bishopric grew increasingly dependent on the city of Basel, with the city granting him a mortgage on Birseck Castle in 1542, 1544, and 1545. In 1547, Philippe and the city formally agreed to allow the city to choose its own religion, recognizing that the city had already become Protestant.

He died in Porrentruy on 14 September 1553.

Catholic Church titles
Preceded by Christoph von Utenheim	Prince-Bishop of Basel; 1527–1553	Succeeded by Melchior von Lichtenfels
