= Jan Szylling =

Polish philosopher

Jan Szylling (fl. early 16th century) was a Polish Scholastic philosopher.

== Life ==
Jan Szylling, a native of Kraków, studied with Jacques Lefèvre d'Étaples (in Latin, Jacobus Faber Stapulensis) in Paris, France, in the first years of the 16th century. Later he was a cathedral canon in Kraków.

When Nominalism was revived in western Europe at the turn of the sixteenth century, particularly thanks to Lefèvre d'Étaples, it presently reappeared in Kraków and began taking the upper hand there once more over Thomism and Scotism. It was Jan Szylling who reintroduced it to Kraków.

== See also ==
- History of philosophy in Poland
- List of Poles
