= François Vatable =

16th-century French scholar

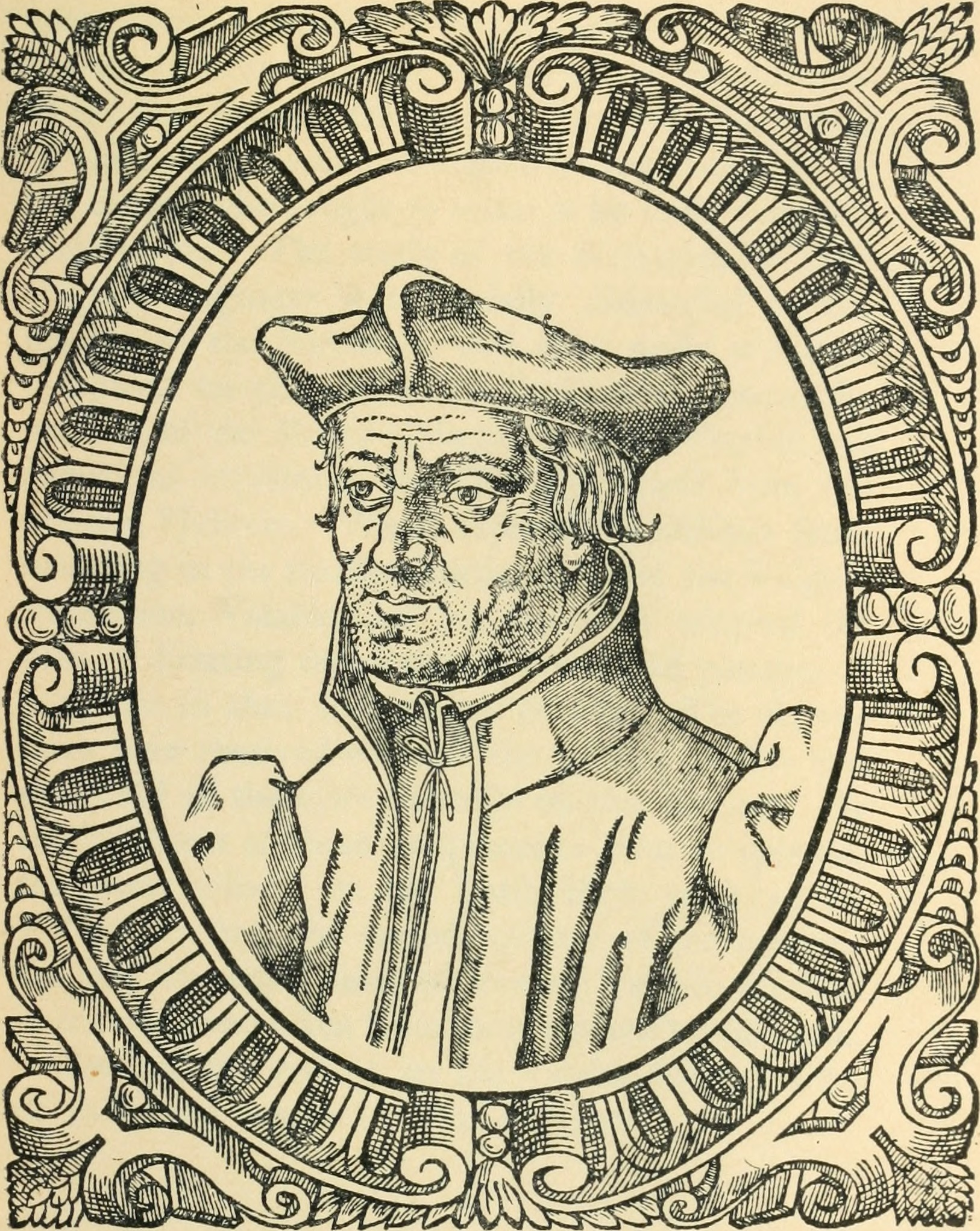
Portrait of Vatable in Theodore Beza's Icones (1580)

François Vatable (late 15th century – 16 March 1547) was a French humanist scholar, a hellenist and hebraist.

== Life ==
Born in Gamaches, Picardy, he was for a time rector of Bramet in Valois. In 1530 Francis I of France appointed him as one of his Royal Lecturers in what afterwards became known as the Collège de France. Vatable got the chair of Hebrew. At a later date a royal grant conferred upon Vatable the title of Abbot of Bellozane, with the benefices attached thereto. Vatable is regarded as the restorer of Hebrew scholarship in France, and his lectures in Paris attracted a large audience including Jews. He was known by his immense erudition, his gift of communication, his talent as a teacher and the support of his listeners. His work is not very extensive, but very admired.

Vatable died in Paris.

== Work ==
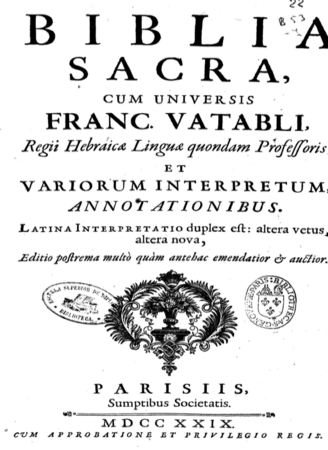
Biblia Sacra, ten editions published between 1584 and 1729

Vatablus published no works of his own, but in his early years (1518 onwards as an assistant to Jacques Lefèvre d'Étaples) he procured new Latin translations and editions from the Greek works by The Philosopher, as Aristotle was known. These works were inquiries in physics, human and animal nature, psychology, astronomy, and meteorology (Physica, De caelo, De anima, De generatione et corruptione, Meteorologica, and the so-called Parva naturalia (minor tracts on physical phenomena)). These became standard textbooks of Universities throughout Europe.

As a Royal lecturer he actively participated in the edition of a better text of the different Books of the Bible. He procured Hebrew editions for scholarly use (published by Robert Estienne, or in English Robert Stephens). To the edition of the Minor Prophets he added the commentary of the famous Jewish Rabbi David Kimhi. From the lecture notes taken by Vatable's pupils, Robert Estienne also drew material for the scholia which he added to his edition of the Latin Bible in two columns, juxtaposing the new Latin translation of the Zurich Bible by Leo Jud to the standard Latin text of the Vulgate. Afterwards the Sorbonne doctors sharply inveighed against the Lutheran tendencies of some of the notes in Estienne's Bible. By then Vatable had already died. The notes in Estienne's Bible are a model of clear, concise literary, and critical exegesis. The Salamanca theologians, with the authorization of the Spanish Inquisition, issued a new thoroughly-revised edition of them in their Latin Bible of 1584.

From the edition of 1729 which Jacques Paul Migne republished in his Scripturae sacrae cursus completus (1841), the scholia on the Book of Esdras and Book of Nehemiah. The notes on the Psalms, published separately in 1545 were re-edited (and augmented) in Estienne's Liber Psalmorum Davidis (1557), published in Geneva. These were reprinted together with remarks of Hugo Grotius, by Vogel, under the misleading title: Francisci Vatabli annotationes in Psalmos (1767).

== See also ==
- Jacques Dubois, his student
- Minuscule 398 – one of his manuscripts
