= Guillaume Briçonnet (cardinal) =

French cardinal and statesman

His Eminence Guillaume Briçonnet
- Archbishop of Narbonne
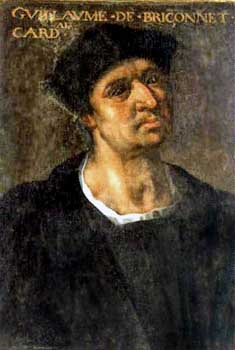
- Church: Catholic Church
- Archdiocese: Narbonne
- Appointed: 1507
- Term ended: 1514
- Predecessor: François Guillaume de Castelnau-Clermont-Ludève
- Successor: Giulio de Medici
- Previous posts: Bishop of Saint-Malo (1493-1513); Archbishop of Reims (1497-1507); Cardinal-Bishop of Albano (1507-1508); Cardinal-Bishop of Frascati (1508-1509); Cardinal-Bishop of Palestrina (1509-1511)

Orders
- Created cardinal: 16 January 1495 by Pope Alexander VI
- Rank: Cardinal-Bishop

Personal details
- Born: 1445 Tours, France
- Died: 14 December 1514 (aged 68–69) Narbonne, France
- Buried: Narbonne Cathedral

Guillaume Briçonnet (French pronunciation: [ɡijom bʁisɔnɛ]; 1445–14 December 1514) was a French cardinal and statesman.

== Political career ==
Born at Tours, Guillaume Briçonnet was a younger son of Jean Briçonnet, Lord of Varennes, in Touraine, Secretary to the king and collector-general of Customs. Appointed Superintendent of Finances for the Province of Languedoc under Louis XI of France, Guillaume Briçonnet discharged the duties of his office with such integrity and efficiency, and showed himself so devoted to the interests of Louis that that monarch recommended him to his successor. Charles VIII of France made him Secretary of the Treasury. He also raised him to the first place in the Council of State, and, according to the historian Francesco Guicciardini, would undertake nothing in the government of his kingdom without the advice of Briçonnet.

Ludovico Sforza, called the Moor, wishing to dispossess his nephew of the Duchy of Milan, and finding himself opposed by Ferdinand I of Naples, sent an embassy under the Carlo Barbiano di Belgioioso to Charles to induce the king of France to assert his claims to the Kingdom of Naples as heir to the house of Anjou. Sforza promised to place all his troops at the king's service.

== Ecclesiastical career ==
By 1487, Briçonnet’s wife Raoulette had died; as a widower, he decided to enter the church.

To flatter his ambition the Milanese ambassadors assured him that the king's influence would raise him to the cardinalate. Briçonnet, thus won over to the Sforza interest, adroitly encouraged the warlike dispositions of his sovereign, triumphed over the opposition of the royal council, of the Duke of Bourbon, and of Anne of France, the Duke's wife, influenced Charles to sign a secret treaty with Sforza, and assured the king of his ability to raise the funds necessary to carry on the war both on land and sea. He was named as the Bishop of St.-Malo in 1493.

Pope Alexander VI, alarmed at the apparent danger threatening Italy, promised the cardinal's hat to Briçonnet if he could prevail upon Charles to abandon his enterprise; but Briçonnet, realizing that he could not govern without flattering the king's passion for conquest, urged him on, and, notwithstanding the dilapidated state of the treasury, succeeded in meeting the expenses of the war. Accompanying Charles on his expedition, he provoked a mutiny in the French army, by his treachery in sacrificing the Pisans, allies of France, to their enemies, the Florentines, and had he not hidden himself from the fury of the soldiers they would have taken his life. Upon this occasion, as upon others, Briçonnet's ambition led him into conduct at variance with his motto: Ditat servata fides. Charles had entered Rome as a conqueror, greatly irritated with Alexander VI for having stirred up opposition to him; but the adroit Briçonnet reconciled his royal master with the pope, and for reward received the cardinal's hat. This honour was conferred in a special consistory held in the king's presence on 16 January 1495. The new cardinal took the title of Cardinal of St.-Malo, from his episcopal see.

Briçonnet soon had cause to repent the advice he had given to invade Italy. A formidable league was formed for the purpose of cutting off the French retreat, and neither the diplomacy nor the entreaties of the French cardinal had any effect on the hostile generals. The prowess of Charles and the valour of his troops alone saved the French from defeat. With 8,000 men the king defeated, at Fornovo, an army of 40,000, and opened a road to France. Soon after this Briçonnet, induced by a tempting promise of preferment for one of his sons, tried to persuade Charles to break off the peace negotiations and support with an army the Duke of Orleans' claims to the Duchy of Milan. Charles, however, preferred the counsels of Philippe de Comines and sacrificed the interests of the duke, and the king's premature death put an end to the influence of Briçonnet, Louis XII giving his confidence to the Cardinal d'Amboise.

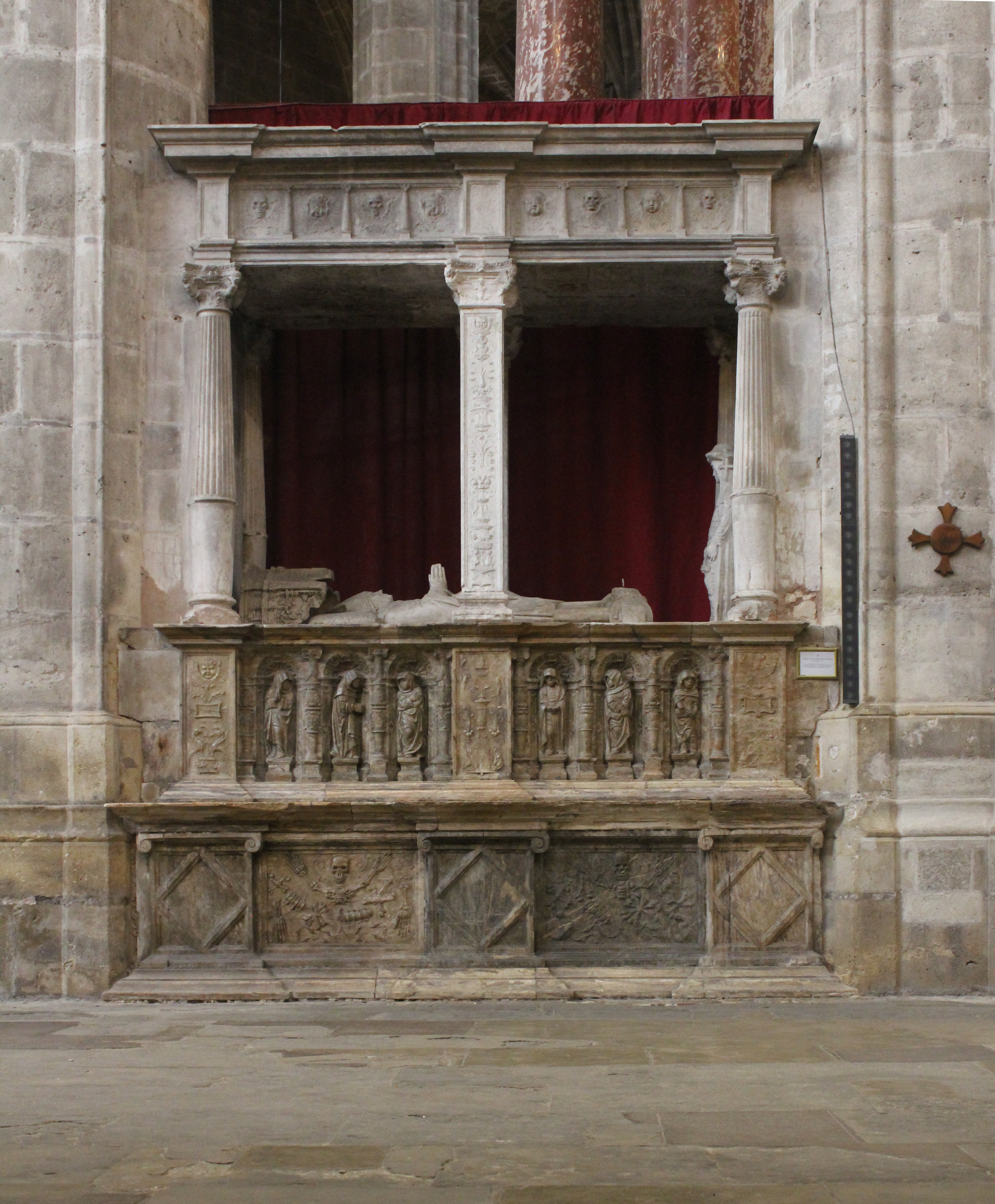
Tomb of Cardinal Briçonnet in Narbonne Cathedral

While serving his king and the State, the Cardinal of St.-Malo had not overlooked his own interests; he had obtained from Alexander VI the Bishopric of Nimes. His title being disputed by the nominee of the chapter, there arose a litigation which lasted until the year 1507, when Briçonnet was awarded the title. In 1497 he had received in commendam the Bishopric of Toulon, and in the same year succeeded his brother Robert Briçonnet in the archiepiscopal See of Reims. On 27 May 1498, he crowned Louis XII in his cathedral. He followed the king to Paris. As a peer of France, he assisted at the session of the Council of State at which the marriage of Louis with Jeanne, the daughter of Louis XI, was annulled.

When he had ceased to be a minister of State, Briçonnet retired to Rome for two years. Louis then made use of his talents to check what he called the arrogance of the warrior pope, Julius II. By his king's direction Briçonnet took steps to assemble at Pisa a council of cardinals opposed to the policy of Julius, and bent on the reformation of the head and hierarchy of the Church. He left Rome suddenly and secretly with a group of cardinals whom he had won over, and opened his council at Pisa, but soon transferred it to Milan, and thence to Lyon. He was, however, summoned to appear before the pope, was deprived of the Roman purple and excommunicated. Louis, on his side, bestowed upon him in commendam the rich Abbey of St.-Germain-des-Prés and the government of Languedoc.

At the death of Julius II Briçonnet was absolved from all censures and excommunication in 1513, and restored by Pope Leo X to the Sacred College. He then retired to end his days at Narbonne, for which see he had exchanged Reims.

He died in Narbonne on 14 December 1514. He was buried in a superb mausoleum which he had built for himself in the church of Our Lady.

== Family ==
He married Raoulette de Beaune (died 1487) and they had five children, two of whom became bishops: Guillaume of Lodève and Meaux, and Denis of Toulon, Lodève and Saint-Malo.

== Legacy ==
Whilst in power, Briçonnet showed himself a patron of men of letters; they dedicated their works to him and became his panegyrists. He was called oraculum regis and regni columna. His life was in fact swayed by ambition and occupied by intrigues. He composed a manual of Latin prayers, dedicated to Charles VIII. At Saint-Malo he issued several synodal instructions.
