= History of electric power transmission =

Electric power transmission, the tools and means of moving electricity far from where it is generated, date back to the late 19th century. They include the movement of electricity in bulk (formally called "transmission") and the delivery of electricity to individual customers ("distribution"). In the beginning, the two terms were used interchangeably.

== Early transmission ==
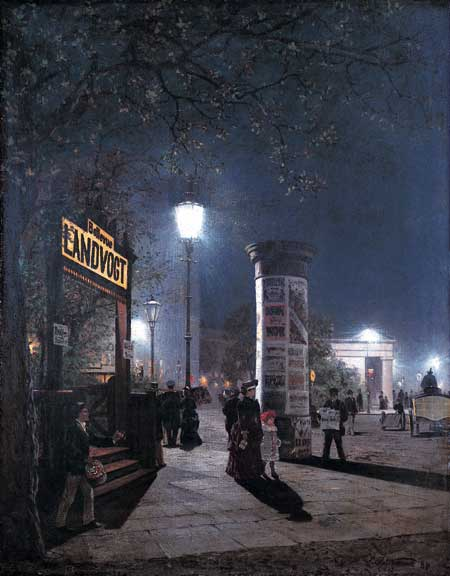
Berlin, 1884. With double the brilliance of gaslight, arc lamps were in high demand for stores and public areas. Arc lighting circuits used up to thousands of volts with arc lamps connected in series.

Prior to electricity, various systems had been used for transmission of power across large distances. Chief among them were telodynamic (cable in motion), pneumatic (pressurized air), and hydraulic (pressurized liquid) transmission. Cable cars were the most frequent example of telodynamic transmission, whose lines could extend for several miles for a single section. Pneumatic transmission was used for city power transmission systems in Paris, Birmingham, Rixdorf, Offenbach, Dresden and Buenos Aires at the beginning of the twentieth century. Cities in the 19th century also used hydraulic transmission using high pressure water mains to deliver power to factory motors. London's system delivered 7,000 horsepower (5.2 MW) over a 180-mile (290 km) network of pipes carrying water at 800 pounds per square inch (5.5 MPa). These systems were replaced by cheaper and more versatile electrical systems, but by the end of the 19th century, city planners and financiers were well aware of the benefits, economics, and process of establishing power transmission systems.

In the early days of electric power usage, widespread transmission of electric power had two obstacles. First, devices requiring different voltages required specialized generators with their own separate lines. Street lights, electric motors in factories, power for streetcars and lights in homes are examples of the diversity of devices with voltages requiring separate systems. Secondly, generators had to be relatively near their loads (a mile or less for low voltage devices). It was known that longer distance transmission was possible the higher the voltage was raised, so both problems could be solved if transforming voltages from a single universal power line could be done efficiently.

== Specialized systems ==
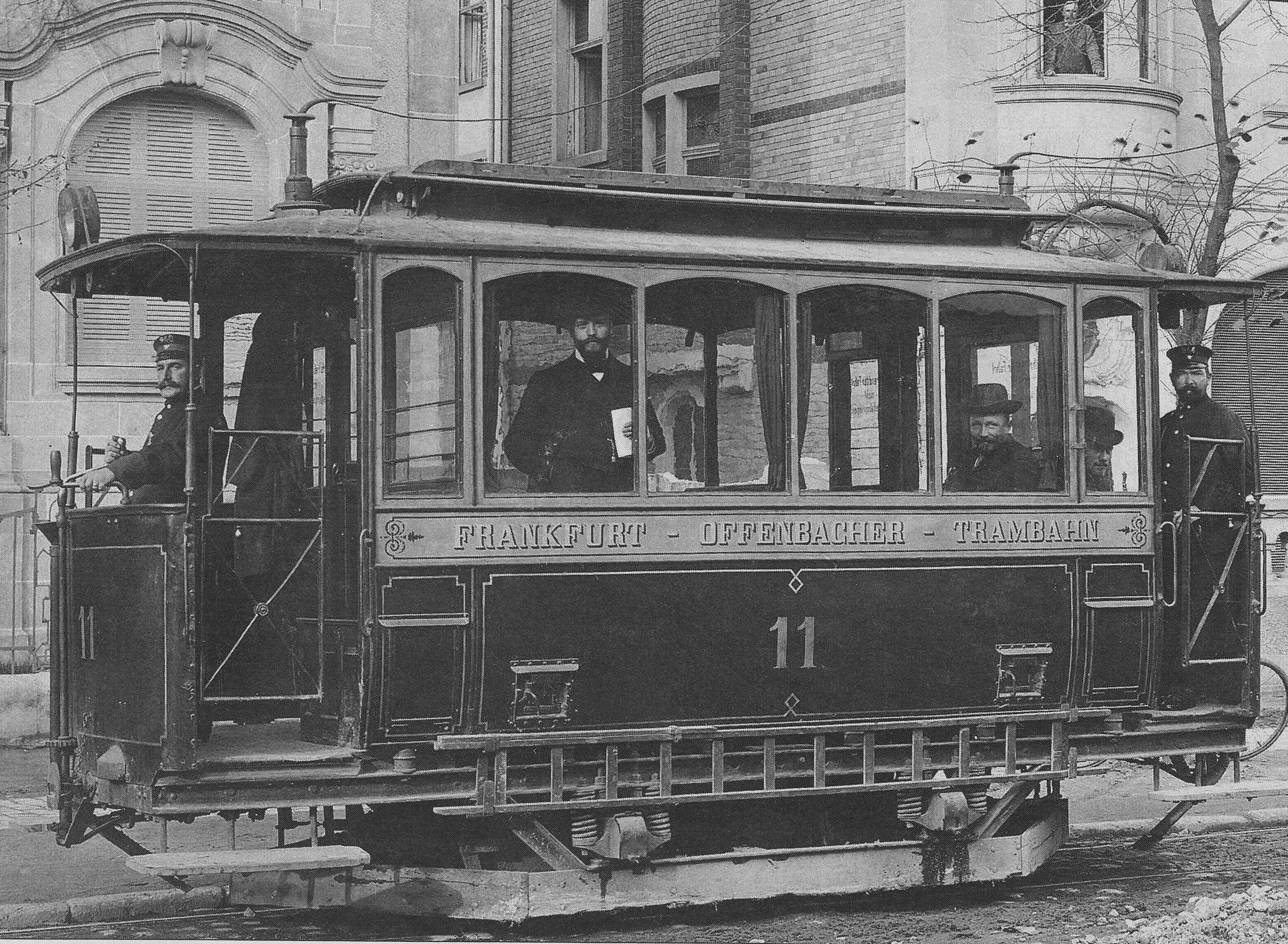
Streetcars created enormous demand for early electricity. This Siemens Tram from 1884 required 500 V direct current, which was typical.

Much of early electricity was direct current, which could not easily be increased or decreased in voltage either for long-distance transmission or for sharing a common line to be used with multiple types of electric devices. Companies simply ran different lines for the different classes of loads their inventions required. For example, Charles Brush's New York arc lamp systems required up to 10 kV for many lamps in a series circuit, Edison's incandescent lights used 110 V, streetcars built by Siemens or Sprague required large motors in the 500 volt range, whereas industrial motors in factories used still other voltages. Due to this specialization of lines, and because transmission was so inefficient, it seemed at the time that the industry would develop into what is now known as a distributed generation system with large numbers of small generators located near their loads.

== Early high voltage exterior lighting ==
High voltage was of interest to early researchers working on the problem of transmission over distance. They knew from elementary electricity principle that the same amount of power could be transferred on a cable by doubling the voltage and halving the current. Due to Joule's Law, they also knew that the power lost from heat in a wire is proportional to the square of the current traveling on it, regardless the voltage, and so by doubling the voltage, the same cable would be capable of transmitting the same amount of power four times the distance.

At the Paris Exposition of 1878, electric arc lighting had been installed along the Avenue de l'Opera and the Place de l'Opera, using electric Yablochkov arc lamps, powered by Zénobe Gramme alternating current dynamos. Yablochkov candles required high voltage, and it was not long before experimenters reported that the arc lamps could be powered on a 14-kilometre (8.7 mi) circuit. Within a decade scores of cities would have lighting systems using a central power plant that provided electricity to multiple customers via electrical transmission lines. These systems were in direct competition with the dominant gaslight utilities of the period.

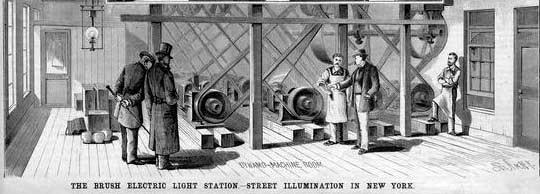
Brush Electric Company's central power plant dynamos powered arc lamps for public lighting in New York. Beginning operation in December 1880 at 133 West Twenty-Fifth Street, it powered a 2-mile (3.2 km) long circuit.

The idea of investing in a central plant and a network to deliver energy produced to customers who pay a recurring fee for service was familiar business model for investors: it was identical to the lucrative gaslight business, or the hydraulic and pneumatic power transmission systems. The only difference was the commodity being delivered was electricity, not gas, and the "pipes" used for delivering were more flexible.

The California Electric Company (now PG&E) in San Francisco in 1879 used two direct current generators from Charles Brush's company to supply multiple customers with power for their arc lamps. This San Francisco system was the first case of a utility selling electricity from a central plant to multiple customers via transmission lines. CEC soon opened a second plant with 4 additional generators. Service charges for light from sundown to midnight was $10 per lamp per week.

Grand Rapids Electric Light & Power Company, established in March 1880 by William T. Powers and others, began operation of the world's first commercial central station hydroelectric power plant, Saturday, July 24, 1880, getting power from Wolverine Chair and Furniture Company's water turbine. It operated a 16-light Brush electric dynamo lighting several storefronts in Grand Rapids, Michigan. It is the earliest predecessor of Consumers Energy of Jackson, Michigan.

In December 1880, Brush Electric Company set up a central station to supply a 2-mile (3.2 km) length of Broadway with arc lighting. By the end of 1881, New York, Boston, Philadelphia, Baltimore, Montreal, Buffalo, San Francisco, Cleveland and other cities had Brush arc lamp systems, producing public light well into the 20th century. By 1893 there were 1500 arc lamps illuminating New York streets.

== Direct current lighting ==
Early arc lights were extremely bright and the high voltages presented a sparking/fire hazard, making them too dangerous to use indoors. In 1878 inventor Thomas Edison saw a market for a system that could bring electric lighting directly into a customer's business or home, a niche not served by arc lighting systems. After devising a commercially viable incandescent light bulb in 1879, Edison went on to develop the first large scale investor-owned electric illumination "utility" in lower Manhattan, eventually serving one square mile with 6 "jumbo dynamos" housed at Pearl Street Station. When service began in September 1882, there were 85 customers with 400 light bulbs. Each dynamo produced 100 kW – enough for 1200 incandescent lights, and transmission was at 110 V via underground conduits. The system cost $300,000 to build with installation of the 100,000 feet (30,000 m) of underground conduits one of the most expensive parts of the project. Operating expenses exceeded income in the first two years and fire destroyed the plant in 1890. Further, Edison had a three wire system so that either 110 V or 220 V could be supplied to power some motors.

== Transformers and alternating current ==
In 1876, Pavel Yablochkov patented his mechanism of using induction coils to serve as a step up transformer prior to the Paris Exposition demonstrating his arc lamps. In 1881, Lucien Gaulard and John Dixon Gibbs developed a more efficient device which they dubbed the secondary generator, namely an early step-down transformer whose ratio could be adjusted by configuring the connections between a series of wired bobbins around a spindle, from which an iron core could be added or removed as necessary to vary the power output. The device was subject to various criticisms and was occasionally misunderstood as only providing a 1:1 turn ratio.

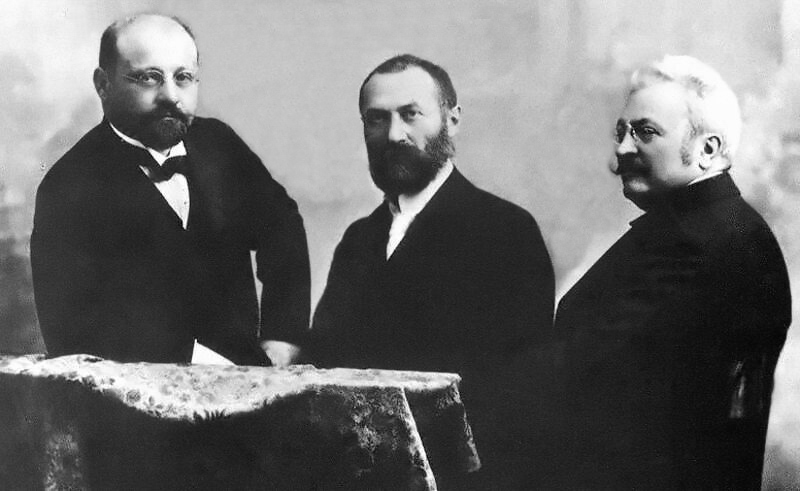
Károly Zipernowsky, Ottó Bláthy, and Miksa Déri) invented the first high efficiency, closed core shunt connection transformer and the modern power distribution system connecting transformers in parallel to the main line transfer instead of in series.

The first demonstrative long-distance (34 km, 21 mi) AC line was built for the 1884 International Exhibition of Turin, Italy. It was powered by a 2-kV, 130-Hz Siemens & Halske alternator and featured several Gaulard secondary generators with their primary windings connected in series, which fed incandescent lamps. The system proved the feasibility of AC electric power transmission over long distances. Between 1884 and 1885, Hungarian engineers Zipernowsky, Bláthy, and Déri from the Ganz company in Budapest created the efficient "Z.B.D." closed-core coils, as well as the modern electric distribution system. The three had discovered that all former coreless or open-core devices were incapable of regulating voltage and were therefore impractical. Their joint patent described two versions of a design with no poles: the "closed-core transformer" and the "shell-core transformer". Ottó Bláthy suggested the use of closed-cores, Károly Zipernowsky the use of shunt connections, and Miksa Déri performed the experiments. The new ZBD transformers were 3.4 times more efficient than the open-core bipolar devices of Gaulard and Gibbs.

In the closed-core transformer, the iron core is a closed ring around which the two coils are wound. In the shell-type transformer, the windings are passed through the core. In both designs, the magnetic flux linking the primary and secondary windings travels almost entirely within the iron core, with no intentional path through air. The core consists of iron strands or sheets.

The ZBD patents included two other major interrelated innovations: one concerning the use of parallel connected, instead of series connected, utilization loads, the other concerning the ability to have high turns ratio transformers such that the supply network voltage could be much higher (initially 1,400 to 2,000 V) than the voltage of utilization loads (100 V initially preferred). These revolutionary design elements would finally make it technically and economically feasible to provide electric power for lighting in homes, businesses and public spaces. Ottó Bláthy also discovered the transformer formula, Vs/Vp = Ns/Np. Electrical and electronic systems the world over rely on the principles of the original Ganz transformers. The inventors are also credited with the first use of the word "transformer" to describe a device for altering the EMF of an electric current.

In May 1885, at the Hungarian National Exhibition in Budapest, Deri, Blathy, and Zipernowski held a large-scale demonstration of what is widely regarded as the prototype of modern AC lighting systems. Their system used 75 transformers in parallel connection, supplying 1,067 incandescent Edison lamps from an AC generator that provided 1,350 V.

When George Westinghouse became interested in electricity, he quickly and correctly concluded that Edison's low voltages were too inefficient to be scaled up for transmission needed for large systems. He further understood that long-distance transmission needed high voltage and that inexpensive conversion technology only existed for alternating current. Transformers would play the decisive role in the victory of alternating current over direct current for transmission and distribution systems.

The concept that is the basis of modern transmission using inexpensive step-up and step-down transformers was first implemented by Westinghouse, William Stanley, Jr. and Franklin Leonard Pope in 1886 in Great Barrington, Massachusetts, resorting also to European technology. In 1888 Westinghouse also licensed Nikola Tesla's induction motor which they eventually developed into a usable (2-phase) AC motor. The modern 3-phase system was developed by Mikhail Dolivo-Dobrovolsky and Allgemeine Elektricitäts-Gesellschaft and Charles Eugene Lancelot Brown in Europe, starting in 1889.

The International Electro-Technical Exhibition of 1891, in Frankfurt, Germany, featured the long-distance transmission of high-power, three-phase electric current. It was held between 16 May and 19 October on the disused site of the three former “Westbahnhöfe” (Western Railway Stations) in Frankfurt am Main. The exhibition featured the first long-distance transmission of high-power, three-phase electric current, which was generated 175 km away at Lauffen am Neckar. It successfully operated motors and lights at the fair. When the exhibition closed, the power station at Lauffen continued in operation, providing electricity for the administrative capital, Heilbronn, making it the first place to be equipped with three-phase AC power. Many corporate technical representatives (including E.W. Rice of Thomson-Houston Electric Company (what became General Electric)) attended. The technical advisers and representatives were impressed. As a result of the successful field trial, three-phase current, as far as Germany was concerned, became the most economical means of transmitting electrical energy.

The simplicity of polyphase generators and motors meant that besides their efficiency they could be manufactured cheaply, compactly and required little attention to maintain. Simple economics drove the expensive, bulky and mechanically complex DC dynamos to their ultimate extinction. As it turned out, the deciding factor in the war of the currents was the availability of low-cost step-up and step-down transformers that meant that all customers regardless of their specialized voltage requirements could be served at minimal cost of conversion. This "universal system" is today regarded as one of the most influential innovations for the use of electricity.

== Availability of large-scale generation ==
Availability of large amounts of power from diverse locations would become possible after Charles Parsons' production of turbogenerators beginning 1889. Turbogenerator output quickly jumped from 100 kW to 25 megawatts in two decades. Prior to efficient turbogenerators, hydroelectric projects were a significant source of large amounts of power requiring transmission infrastructure.

== High voltage direct current transmission ==
The case for alternating current was not clear at the turn of the century and high voltage direct current transmission systems were successfully installed without the benefit of transformers. Rene Thury, who had spent six months at Edison's Menlo Park facility, understood his problem with transmission and was convinced that moving electricity over great distances was possible using direct current. He was familiar with the work of Marcel Deprez, who did early work on high voltage transmission after being inspired by the capability of arc lamp generators to support lights over great distances. Deprez avoided transformers by placing generators and loads in series as arc lamp systems of Charles F. Brush did. Thury developed this idea into the first commercial system for high-voltage DC transmission. Like Brush's dynamos, current is kept constant, and when increasing load demands more pressure, voltage is increased. The Thury System was successfully used on several DC transmission projects from Hydro generators. The first in 1885 was a low voltage system in Bözingen, and the first high voltage system went into service in 1889 in Genoa, Italy, by the Acquedotto de Ferrari-Galliera company. This system transmitted 630 kW at 14 kV DC over a circuit 120 km long. The largest Thury System was the Lyon Moutiers project that was 230 km in length, eventually delivering 20 megawatts, at 125 kV.

== Victory for AC ==
Ultimately, the versatility of the Thury system was hampered by the fragility of series distribution, and the lack of a reliable DC conversion technology that would not show up until the 1940s with improvements in mercury arc valves. The AC "universal system" won by force of numbers, proliferating systems with transformers both to couple generators to high-voltage transmission lines, and to connect transmission to local distribution circuits. By a suitable choice of utility frequency, both lighting and motor loads could be served. Rotary converters and later mercury-arc valves and other rectifier equipment allowed DC load to be served by local conversion where needed. Even generating stations and loads using different frequencies could also be interconnected using rotary converters. By using common generating plants for every type of load, important economies of scale were achieved, lower overall capital investment was required, load factor on each plant was increased allowing for higher efficiency, allowing for a lower cost of energy to the consumer and increased overall use of electric power.

By allowing multiple generating plants to be interconnected over a wide area, electricity production cost was reduced. The most efficient available plants could be used to supply the varying loads during the day. Reliability was improved and capital investment cost was reduced, since stand-by generating capacity could be shared over many more customers and a wider geographic area. Remote and low-cost sources of energy, such as hydroelectric power or mine-mouth coal, could be exploited to lower energy production cost.

The first transmission of three-phase alternating current using high voltage took place in 1891 during the international electricity exhibition in Frankfurt. A 15 kV transmission line connected Lauffen on the Neckar and Frankfurt am Main, 175 km (109 mi) apart.

== Willamette Falls to Niagara Falls ==
In 1882, the German Miesbach–Munich Power Transmission used 2kV DC over 57 km (35 mi). In 1889, the first long-distance transmission of DC electricity in the United States was switched on at Willamette Falls Station, in Oregon City, Oregon. In 1890, a flood destroyed the power station. This unfortunate event paved the way for the first long-distance transmission of AC electricity in the world when Willamette Falls Electric company installed experimental AC generators from Westinghouse in 1890.

That same year, the Niagara Falls Power Company (NFPC) and its subsidiary Cataract Company formed the International Niagara Commission composed of experts, to analyze proposals to harness Niagara Falls to generate electricity. The commission was led by Sir William Thomson (later Lord Kelvin) and included Eleuthère Mascart from France, William Unwin from England, Coleman Sellers from the US, and Théodore Turrettini from Switzerland. It was backed by entrepreneurs such as J. P. Morgan, Lord Rothschild, and John Jacob Astor IV. Among 19 proposals, they even briefly considered compressed air as a power transmission medium, but preferred electricity. They could not decide which method would be best overall.

By 1893 the Niagara Falls Power Company had rejected the remaining proposals from a half dozen companies and awarded the generating contract to Westinghouse with further transmission lines and transformer contracts awarded to General Electric. Work began in 1893 on the Niagara Falls generation project: 5,000 horsepower (3,700 kW) was to be generated and transmitted as alternating current, at a frequency of 25 Hz to minimize impedance losses in transmission (changed to 60 Hz in the 1950s).

Westinghouse also had to develop a system based on rotary converters to allow them to supply all the needed power standards including single phase and polyphase AC and DC for street cars and factory motors. Westinghouse's initial customer for the power from the hydroelectric generators at the Edward Dean Adams Station at Niagara in 1895 were the plants of the Pittsburgh Reduction Company which needed large quantities of cheap electricity for smelting aluminum. On November 16, 1896, electrical power transmitted to Buffalo began powering its street cars. The generating plants were built by Westinghouse Electric Corporation. The scale of the project had General Electric also contributing, building transmission lines and equipment. That same year Westinghouse and General Electric signed a patent sharing agreement, ending some 300 lawsuits the companies were involved in over their competing electrical patents, and giving them monopolistic control over the US electric power industry for years to come.

Initially transmission lines were supported by porcelain pin-and-sleeve insulators similar to those used for telegraphs and telephone lines. However, these had a practical limit of 40 kV. In 1907, the invention of the disc insulator by Harold W. Buck of the Niagara Falls Power Corporation and Edward M. Hewlett of General Electric allowed practical insulators of any length to be constructed for higher voltages.

== Early 20th century ==
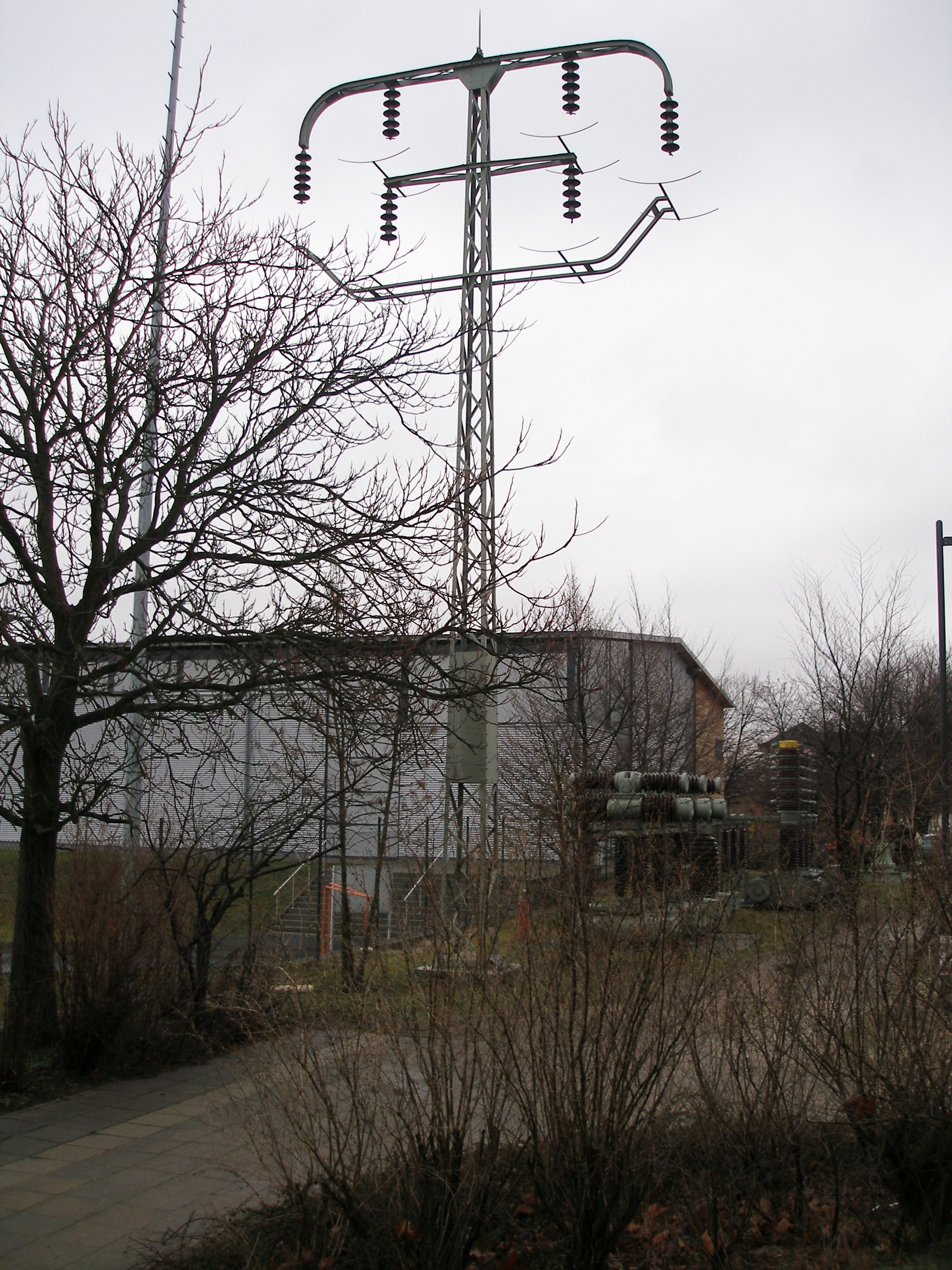
The first 110 kV transmission line in Europe was built around 1912 between Lauchhammer and Riesa, German Empire. Original pole.

Voltages used for electric power transmission increased throughout the 20th century. The first "high voltage" AC power station, rated 4-MW 10-kV 85-Hz, was put into service in 1889 by Sebastian Ziani de Ferranti at Deptford, London. The first electric power transmission line in North America operated at 4000 V. It went online on June 3, 1889, with the lines between the generating station at Willamette Falls in Oregon City, Oregon, and Chapman Square in downtown Portland, Oregon stretching about 13 miles. By 1914 fifty-five transmission systems operating at more than 70,000 V were in service, and the highest voltage then used was 150 kV. The first three-phase alternating current power transmission at 110 kV took place in 1907 between Croton and Grand Rapids, Michigan. Voltages of 100 kV and more were not established technology until around 5 years later, with for example the first 110 kV line in Europe between Lauchhammer and Riesa, Germany, in 1912.

In the early 1920s the Pit River – Cottonwood – Vaca-Dixon line was built for 220 kV transporting power from hydroelectric plants in the Sierra Nevada to the San Francisco Bay Area, at the same time the Big Creek – Los Angeles lines were upgraded to the same voltage. Both of those systems entered commercial service in 1923. In 1926, Great Western Power Company constructed a 103-mile 220 kV line between Brighton Substation near Sacramento and Merced. On April 17, 1929 the first 220 kV line in Germany was completed, running from Brauweiler near Cologne, over Kelsterbach near Frankfurt, Rheinau near Mannheim, Ludwigsburg–Hoheneck near Austria. This line comprises the North-South interconnect, at the time one of the world's largest power systems. The masts of this line were designed for eventual upgrade to 380 kV. However the first transmission at 380 kV in Germany was on October 5, 1957 between the substations in Rommerskirchen and Ludwigsburg–Hoheneck.

The world's first 380 kV power line was built in Sweden, the 952 km Harsprånget – Hallsberg line in 1952. In 1965, the first extra-high-voltage transmission at 735 kV took place on a Hydro-Québec transmission line. In 1982 the first transmission at 1200 kV was in the Soviet Union.

The rapid industrialization in the 20th century made electrical transmission lines and grids a critical part of the economic infrastructure in most industrialized nations. Interconnection of local generation plants and small distribution networks was greatly spurred by the requirements of World War I, where large electrical generating plants were built by governments to provide power to munitions factories; later these plants were connected to supply civil load through long-distance transmission.

Small municipal electrical utilities did not necessarily desire to reduce the cost of each unit of electricity sold; to some extent, especially during the period 1880–1890, electrical lighting was considered a luxury product and electric power was not substituted for steam power. Engineers such as Samuel Insull in the United States and Sebastian Z. De Ferranti in the United Kingdom were instrumental in overcoming technical, economic, regulatory and political difficulties in development of long-distance electric power transmission. By introduction of electric power transmission networks, in the city of London the cost of a kilowatt-hour was reduced to one-third in a ten-year period.

In 1926 electrical networks in the United Kingdom began to be interconnected in the National Grid, initially operating at 132 kV.

== Power electronics ==
Power electronics is the application of solid-state electronics to the control and conversion of electric power. Power electronics started with the development of the mercury arc rectifier. Invented by Peter Cooper Hewitt in 1902, it was used to convert alternating current (AC) into direct current (DC). From the 1920s on, research continued on applying thyratrons and grid-controlled mercury arc valves to power transmission. Uno Lamm developed a mercury valve with grading electrodes making them suitable for high voltage direct current power transmission. In 1933 selenium rectifiers were invented.

== See also ==
- HVDC converter
