= M.III Körting =

Austro-Hungarian military airship

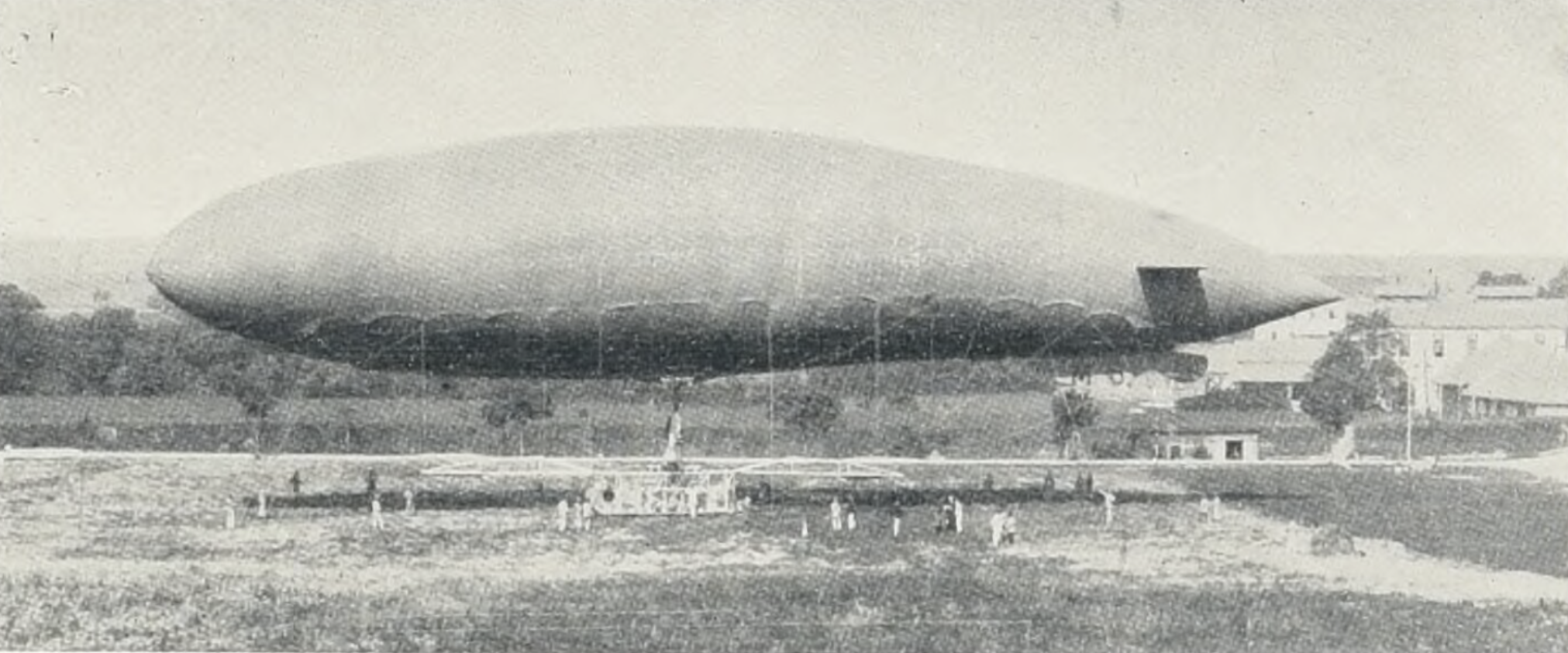
- M.III Körting airship

General information
- Type: Observational airship
- National origin: Austria-Hungary
- Manufacturer: Österreichische Maschinenbau-AG Körting in Vienna
- Status: destroyed during the aircrash on 20 June 1914
- Primary user: Austro-Hungarian Army
- Number built: 1

History
- First flight: 1 January 1911

M.III Körting was a non-rigid military single-gondola airship built in 1911 by the Österreichische Maschinenbau-AG Körting in Vienna, designed by engineers Cassinone, Strattmann and Basenach. The ship was built for the aviatic troops of the Austro-Hungarian Army, conducting radiotelegraphic and photogrammetric research. During military practice on 20 June 1914 near Fischamend, M.III collided with a Farman F.20 military biplane and crashed.

== Operational history ==
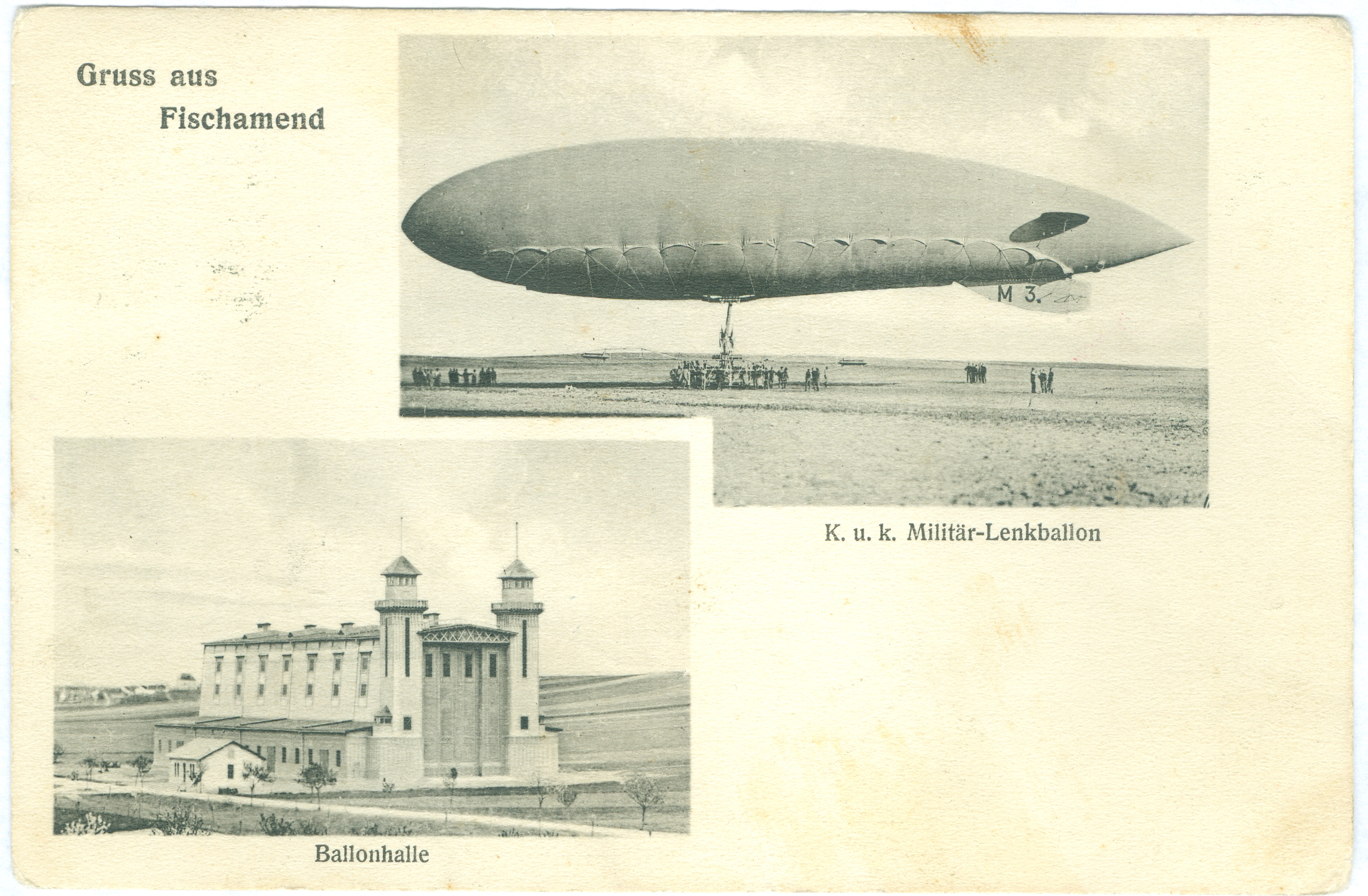
M.III Körting and its hangar in Fischamend

The M.III airship was developed to the order of Austro-Hungarian aviation troops, being the third ordered airship and also the first ship of the Austro-Hungarian airship fleet of home production, having one German (M.I Parseval) and one French-produced (M.II Lebaudy) airship. The gondola and two engines of M.III were produced in Österreichische Maschinenbau-AG Körting, Wien, while the balloon body was made in Österreichisch-Amerikanische Gummifabrik AG, Wien. The ship took its first flight on 1 January 1911 at k.u.k. Military Aeronautical Institute airbase in Fischamend near Vienna. During extensive test flights, research was carried out in the fields of radio telegraphy and photogrammetry for the geographical research. In 1914, a panoramic photogrammetry device based on design of Theodor Scheimpflug, the only one of its kind in the world, and also Siemens & Halske radio station, as a tested feature, were installed in the gondola.

== Körting Disaster ==
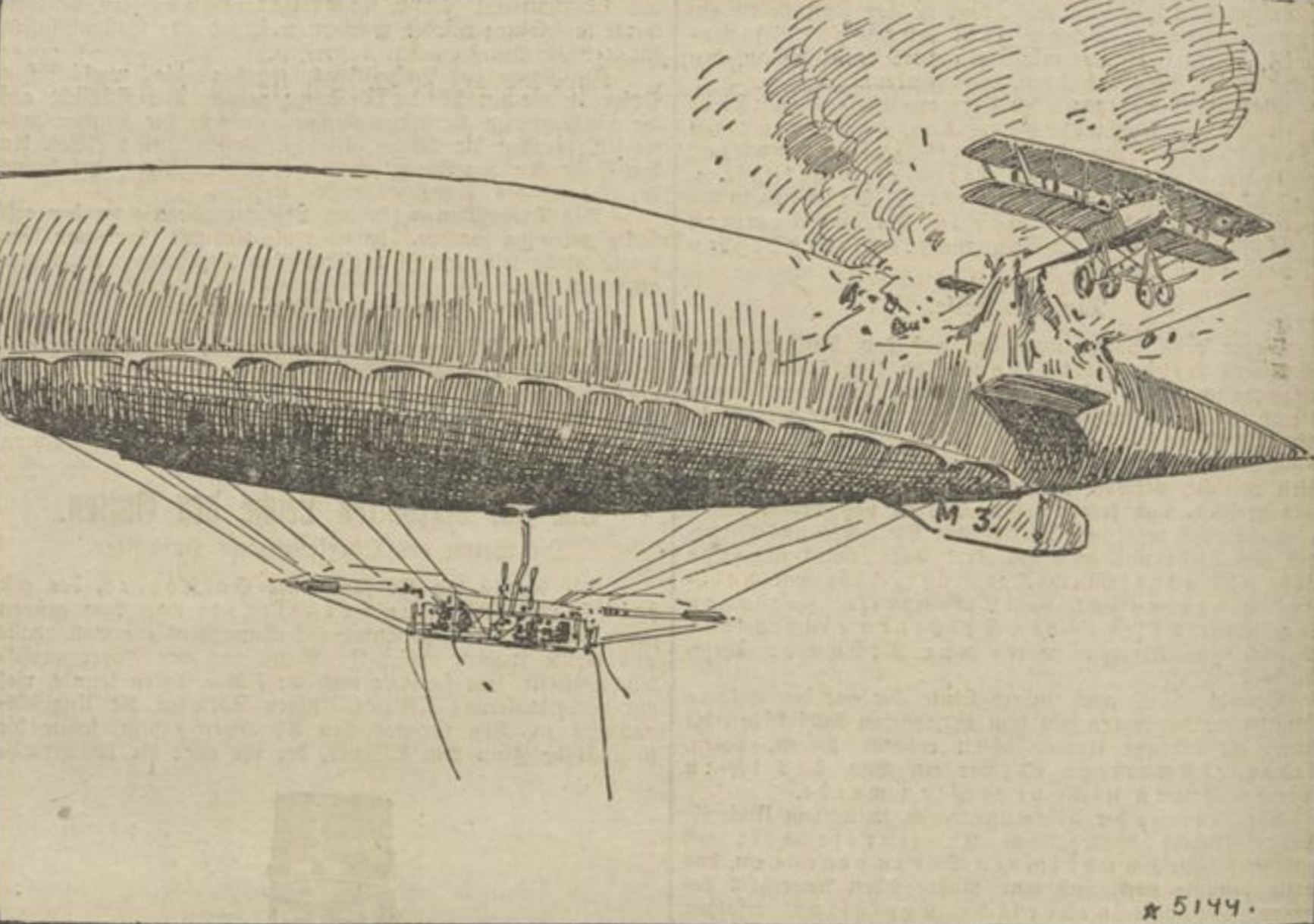
Depiction of the Körting Disaster (Illustrierte Kronen Zeitung, 21 June 1914)

On the morning of 20 June 1914, the M.III with crew of Hauptmann Hauswirth (commander), Olt. Hostaetter, Olt. Breuer, Lt. Haidinger, Korp. Chadima, Gefr. Weber and civil engineer Kammerer onboard took off from Fischamend and flew at an altitude of 300 to 500 meters in the direction of Königsberg. In order to take overlapping photos of the terrain with a Scheimpflug panoramic camera, it moved in spirals. As those moves seemed suspicious for the land commanding staff, the Farman F.20 biplane. with a crew of field pilot Olt. Ernst Flatz and observer Fregatten lt. Puchta were instructed to take a flight closer to the ship and inspect its flight characteristics. Flatz, who was valued for his flying skills but also feared for his recklessness, got his airplane dangerously close to the airship. He then probably started to simulate an air attack, circling the airship. After a few rounds, the airplane tilted to the balloon rubber surface. A collision caused damage to the biplane, which started to fall, and the airship body burst. The M.III's crew started to climb on the top of the balloon, however, an explosion of hydrogen soon followed, blasting the balloon apart and causing the M.III to crash on the ground.

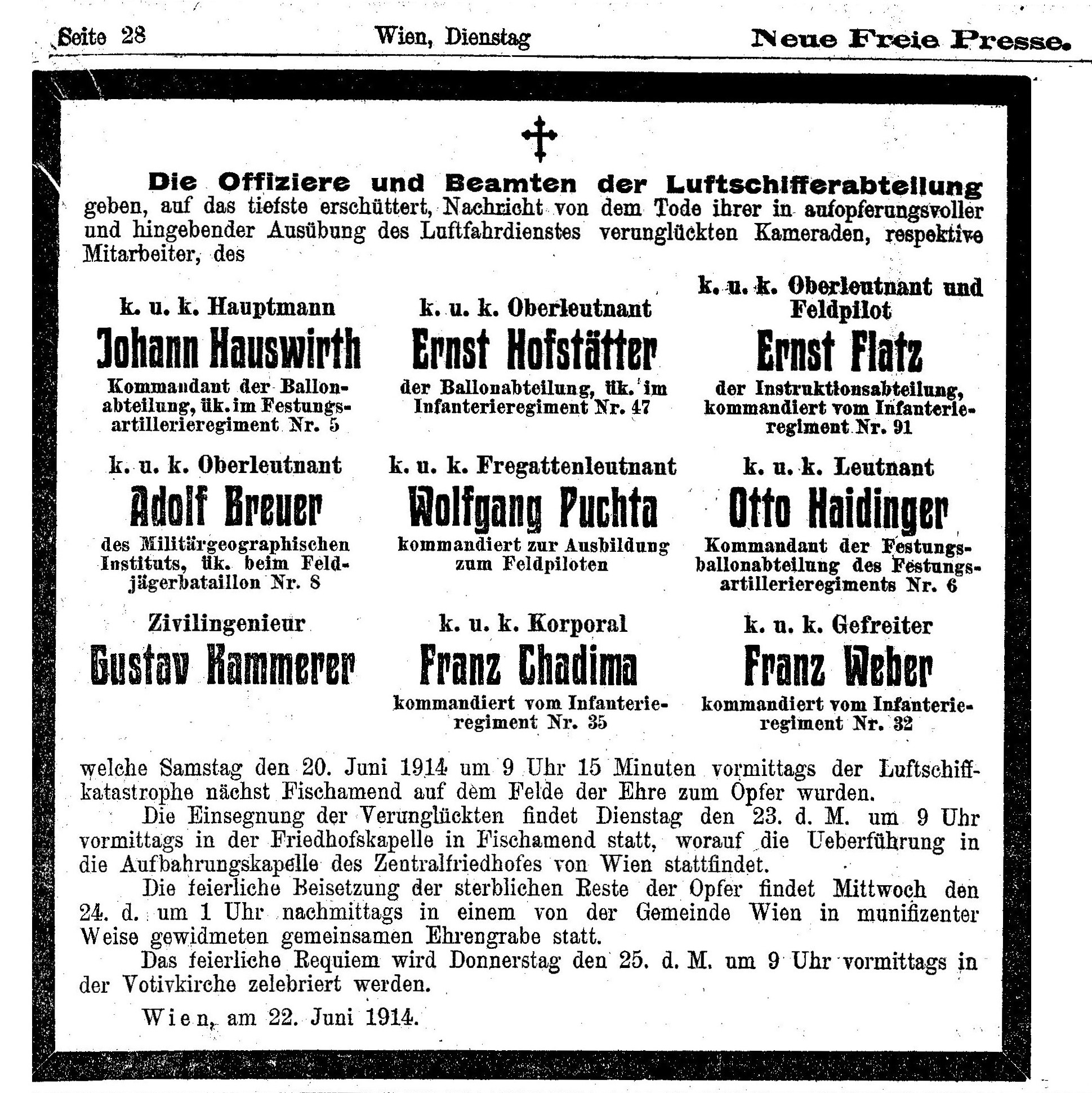
Obituary of the victims of Körting Disaster (Neue Freie Presse, 23 June 1914)

None of the aviatics survived: Flatz and Puchta were killed in the airplane crash, and the airship crew was burned alive from the hydrogen explosion, which made later identification difficult. That afternoon, the site of the disaster was visited by press, and the event was then widely mentioned in Austro-Hungarian and European media. The crash supported the Austro-Hungarian Air Force policy of depending on aircraft heavier than air.

== Specifications ==
General characteristics

- Length: 68 m (223 ft 1 in)
- Diameter: 10.50 m (34 ft 5 in)
- Volume: 3,600 m^{3} (130,000 cu ft)
- Powerplant: 2 × Körting 75 HP , 56 kW (75 hp) each

Performance

- Maximum speed: 57 km/h (35 mph, 31 kn)

== Bibliography ==
- "Der Zusammenstoss in der Luft". Illustrierte Kronen Zeitung (in German). 6040: 6. 21 June 1914.
- Ster, Rudolf (2017). Die k.u.k. Militär-Aeronautische Anstalt Fischamend. Fohnsdorf: Carinaverlag. ISBN 978-3-9503429-8-7.
