= Jules Carpentier =

French engineer and inventor (1851–1921)

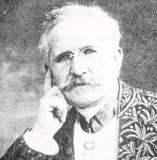
- Jules Carpentier
- Born: 30 August 1851; Paris, France
- Died: 30 June 1921 (aged 69); Joigny, France
- Occupations: Engineer, Inventor

Jules Carpentier (French pronunciation: [ʒyl kaʁpɑ̃tje]; 30 August 1851 – 30 June 1921) was a French engineer and inventor.

Jules Carpentier was a student at the French École polytechnique. He bought the Ruhmkorff workshops in Paris when Heinrich Daniel Ruhmkorff died and made it a successful business for building electrical and magnetical devices. From 1890, he started to build photographic and cinematographic cameras. He is the designer of the submarine periscope, and worked at the adjustment of trichromic process of colour photography.

He patented the "Cinématographe", which served as a film projector and developer in the late 1890s, and built devices from the Lumière Brothers.

Another of his patents, filed in England, was a primary reference of Theodor Scheimpflug, who disclaimed inventing the falsely eponymous Scheimpflug principle.

He died in 1921 in a car accident in Joigny, France.

== Electrical measurements ==
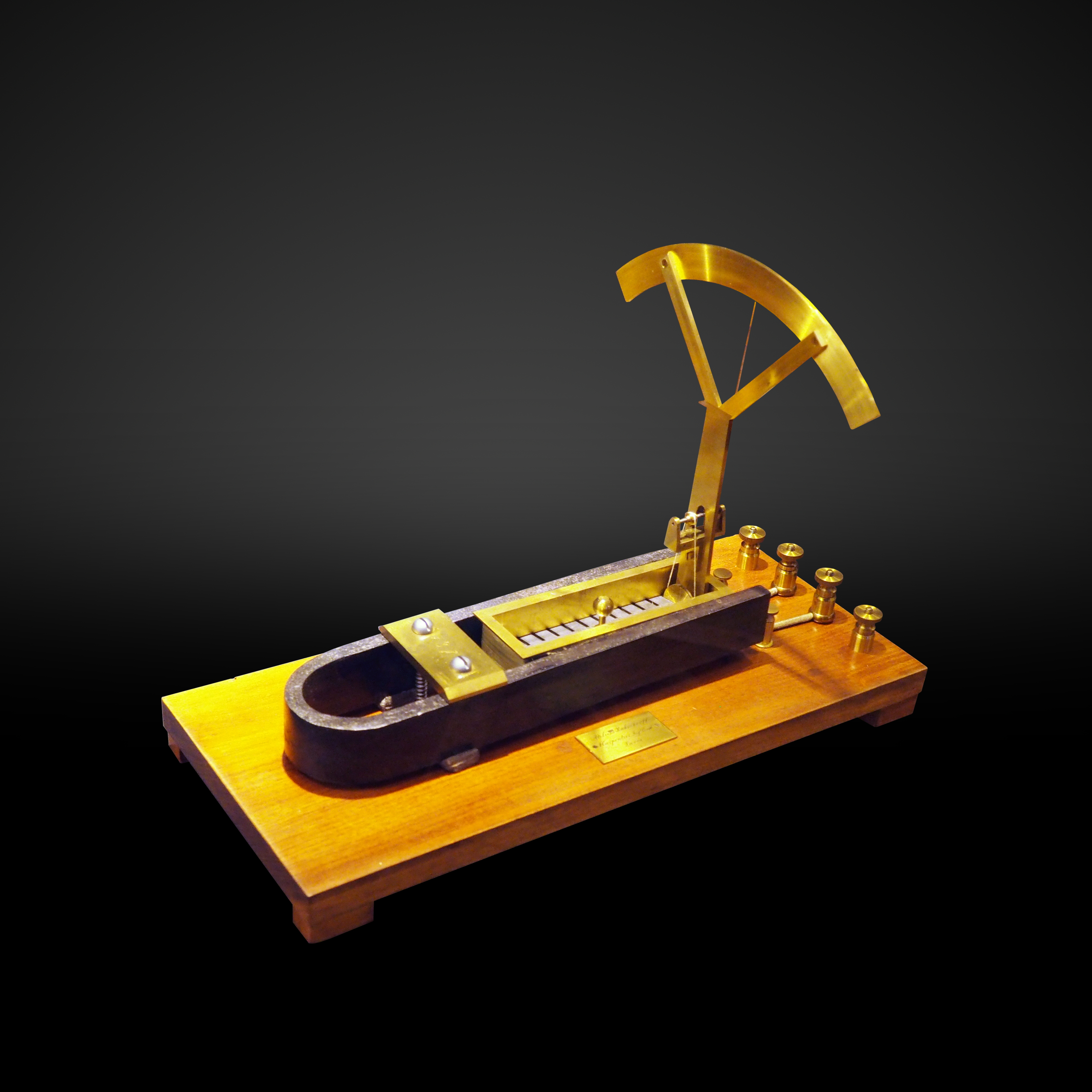
Deprez' and Carpentier's "fishbone" galvanometer (MHS Geneva)

Jules Carpentier was one of the first manufacturers of various models of Galvanometer that had been designed by Marcel Deprez and Arsène d'Arsonval. In addition, Carpentier developed with other people like Éleuthère Mascart, Pellat, Broca, André Blondel, Abraham, Louis Le Chatelier and Callender a series of derivatives of Galvanometer to measure and record intensity, potential tensions and other amounts derived from them. The French engineer and inventor has also contributed to various electrical measurements and the establishment of the necessary rules. Furthermore, for nearly half a century, many electrical measuring instruments took the "Carpentier" mark.

== Telegraphy ==
Jules Carpentier took care of the settings of the French engineer Emile Baudot's telegraph system of Posts and Telecommunications. Some devices regulators, translators and printers completed the system thanks to his work and his main collaborators. Thousands of installations "Baudot" were guided workshops to equip Jules Carpentier telegraph networks in France and many foreign countries.

After the invention of the telegraph and the first tests of Marconi, Gustave Ferrie, then captain of Engineering at the service of military telegraph, was commissioned by the Minister of War, Freycinet, to continue to experience more and do more studies to implementation in France of a material that would make a first class military importance. To achieve these successes, Gustave Ferrie sought the collaboration of Carpentier as builder. They studied about building new bases induction coils and mercury switches specially designed for the wireless telegraph, and soon established a complete electrical equipment for production of radio waves for downloads powerful capacitors by the age.

Jules Carpentier, always in collaboration with Gustave Ferrie, also created the special thermal wavemeters, frequency meters, ammeters and ohmmeters necessary for the introduction of measurements and calculations in the various parts of the wireless telegraph. In 1921, the invention of the three-light electrode lamp by American manufacturer DeForest revolutionized the technique of wireless telegraphy and Carpentier was in the process of introducing its use in electrical and radio measuring instruments when his sudden death interrupted the course of his work.

== Photography ==
Jules Carpentier worked closely with Charles Cros in a process he had invented in 1869 by color photography. In 1885, informed the Academy of Sciences of project definition, classification and annotation color.

Carpentier approached the construction of a photographic apparatus in 1890, creating a handheld photographic camera, the "photo-mate" repeatedly shrunk to 12 plates. This camera allowed taking pictures by eye, pointing through an aligned auxiliary lens, positioned adjacent to the main lens that exposed the film. It was a small portable device, so Jules Carpentier created new models of enlargers with an autofocus mechanism. The "photo-mate" was a huge commercial success and several models were made.

== Cinematography ==
Between late 1894 and early 1895 designed the Louis Lumière Film and Jules Carpentier was responsible for its construction. It was an ingenious combination of light and camera, projector and "truka". To achieve progress intermittently he used a hook mechanism which allowed the film to stop perfectly. The time was still two thirds of the total was between one and the next frame while the shutter, a sector of a circular rotating disk, letting light for 1/25 of a second. After the premiere public screening held at the Salon Indien del Grand Café on 28 December 1895, was carried out immediately making the first 200 Cinematography demanded by the Lumière brothers. To perform this device, Carpentier was deposited in March 1896 a patent for a "mechanism Maltese cross with five branches," and at the end of the month of March, also provided for an "apparatus for photographing animated scenes" of filmic bars called Phototrope.

In 1897, Jules Carpentier made a special Cinematograph projection that was built in two models: Model A, for moving the films Lumière to perforations (Round claws) and Model B for films to Edison perforations (flat claws). In total, 700 to 800 Lumière Cinematograph factories were built by Carpentier. In 1909, Jules Carpentier workshops, in collaboration with the Lumière brothers, also launched a 35mm camera called "Cinématolabe" but achieved very little success in a market that was already dominated by productions from Pathé and Gaumont.

== Optical ==
During 1900, the Department of Shipbuilding asked the help of Jules Carpentier to make periscopes for submarines. This was to provide a "vision tube" under water, "the walrus" in maritime engineering projects in Cherbourg. In 1906, the number of periscopes made by him in service exceeded 80. He also devised trench periscopes that were widely used during the First World War.
