= Aillant-sur-Milleron =

- Commune
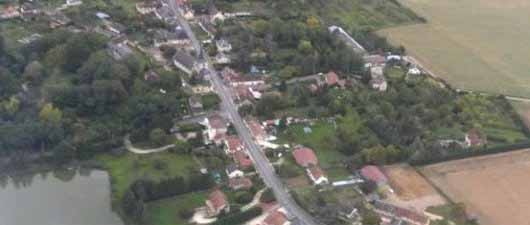
- An aerial view of Aillant-sur-Milleron

- Coat of arms
- Location of Aillant-sur-Milleron
- Location within France Location within Centre-Val de Loire
- Coordinates: 47°47′37″N 2°55′51″E
- Country: France
- Region: Centre-Val de Loire
- Department: Loiret
- Arrondissement: Montargis
- Canton: Lorris
- Intercommunality: Canaux et Forêts en Gâtinais

Government
  - Mayor (2020–2026): Lysiane Chapuis
- Area^{1}: 26.93 km^{2} (10.40 sq mi)
- Highest elevation: 196 m (643 ft)
- Lowest elevation: 138 m (453 ft)
- Population (2023): 373
  - Density: 13.9/km^{2} (35.9/sq mi)
- Time zone: UTC+01:00 (CET)
  - Summer (DST): UTC+02:00 (CEST)
- INSEE/Postal code: 45002 /45230
- ^{1} French Land Register data, which excludes lakes, ponds, glaciers > 1 km^{2} (0.386 sq mi or 247 acres) and river estuaries.

Aillant-sur-Milleron (French pronunciation: [ajɑ̃ syʁ milʁɔ̃]) is a commune in the Loiret department in north-central France.

== Population ==
Historical population
Year	Pop.	±% p.a.
1968	305	—
1975	314	+0.42%
1982	286	−1.33%
1990	302	+0.68%
1999	357	+1.88%
2007	370	+0.45%
2012	386	+0.85%
2017	398	+0.61%
2023	373	−1.08%
Source: INSEE

== Notable person ==
- Marcel Deprez (1843–1918), engineer, born in Aillant-sur-Milleron.

== See also ==
- Communes of the Loiret department
