= Theodor Scheimpflug =

Austrian soldier and photographer (1865–1911)

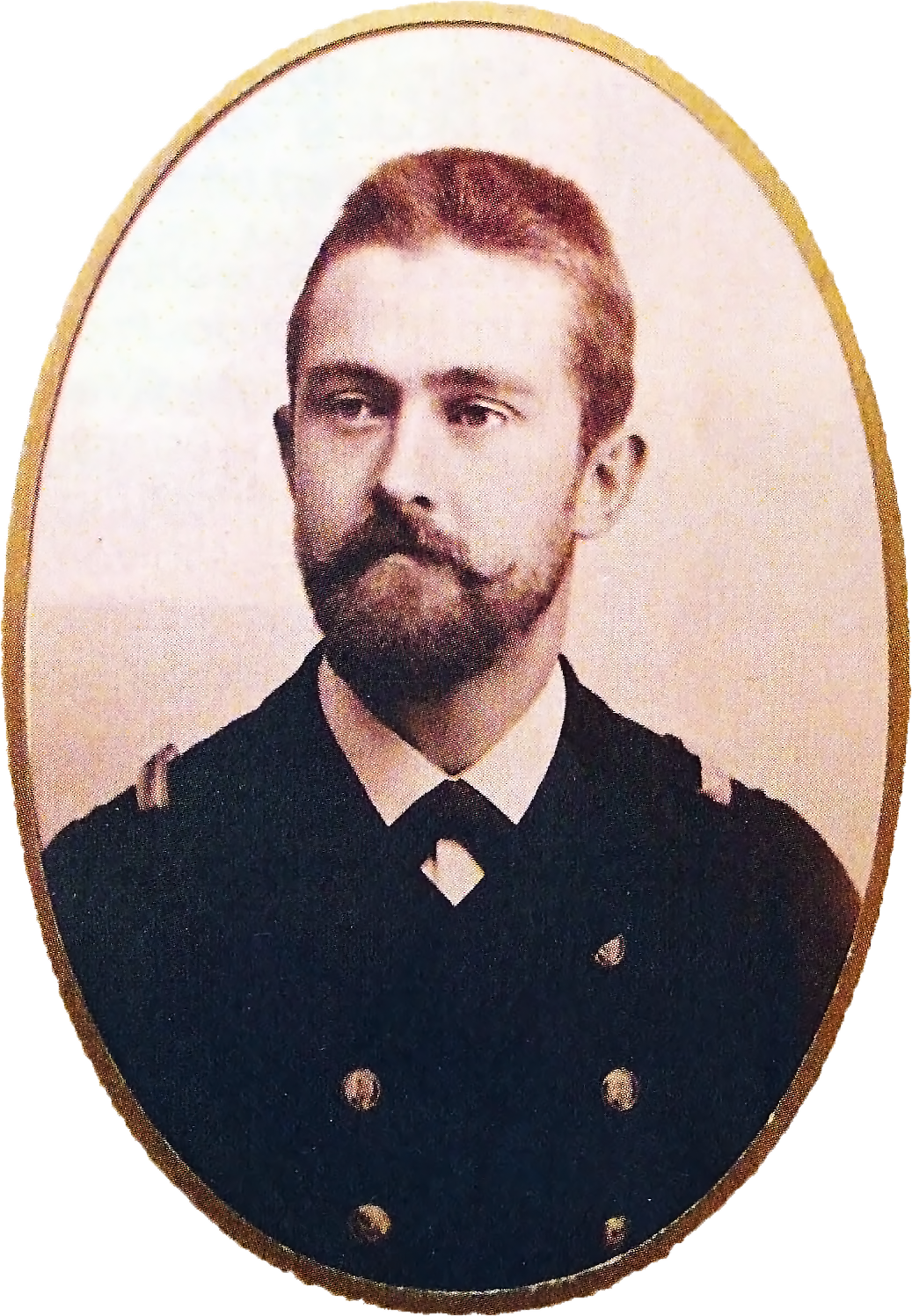
- Born: 7 October 1865; Vienna
- Died: 22 August 1911 (aged 45); Mödling

Theodor Scheimpflug (Austrian German pronunciation: [ˈteːodoːɐ̯ ˈʃaɪmˌpfluːɡ]; 7 October 1865 - 22 August 1911) was an Austrian army Captain who elaborated a systematic method and apparatus for correcting perspective distortion in aerial photographs, now known as the eponymous Scheimpflug principle. He disclaimed inventing it however, citing an English patent of the early French photographic engineer Jules Carpentier.

== Life ==
- Born on 7 October 1865 in Vienna
- Educated at the Imperial and Royal Naval Academy
- 1897 - Attended college in Vienna
- Began Photographic work in 1902
- Died on 22 August 1911 in Mödling

== Work ==
- Best known for his elaboration of the Scheimpflug principle, which deals with the area of critical focus in a view camera, although he was not the first to describe this principle and never claimed this to be the case.
- He was also involved in aerial photography, and held several patents in that area.

== See also ==
- Jules Carpentier
