= Lyon–Moutiers DC transmission scheme =

HVDC transmission line in France

The Lyon–Moutiers DC transmission scheme was the most powerful mechanical high voltage direct current electric power transmission scheme ever built. Designed by Rene Thury, it was used between 1906 and 1936 for power transmission from a hydroelectric power plant at Moûtiers to Lyon, France.

At the Moutiers power plant, there were four generators switched in series, whereby one turbine drove two generators. As the power demand changed, the number of generator switched in series varied, and so did the voltage in the transmission line.

The line was bipolar with a maximum of 75,000 volts to ground and so 150,000 volts between the conductors. The line was 200 kilometres long, with 190 kilometres run overhead and 10 kilometres as paper insulated underground cable. Originally the cable was rated for 75 A, but was later run with 150 A. Even after this increase in current the cable was still in good condition when the scheme was dismantled in 1936.
