= Marcel Deprez =

French electrical engineer

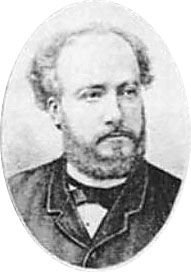
- Born: 12 December 1843; Aillant-sur-Milleron, Loiret, France
- Died: 13 October 1918 (aged 74); Vincennes, Val-de-Marne, France
- Known for: HVDC electricity distribution
- Awards: Awarded membership, French Academy of Sciences

Marcel Deprez (12 December 1843 – 13 October 1918) was a French electrical engineer. He was born in Aillant-sur-Milleron. He died in Vincennes.

== Biography ==
Deprez was born in Aillant-sur-Milleron in rural France and attended the School of Mines in Paris. He was not able to complete the course; however, he must have made a good impression, as he was employed as a secretary to the director of the school, Charles Combes.

At Creil, from 1876 to 1886, Deprez conducted the first experiments to transmit electrical power over long distances. At the International Exposition of Electricity, Paris, in 1881, Deprez undertook the task of presenting an electricity distribution system based on the long-distance transmission of direct current. The first successful attempt took place in 1882 from Miesbach to Munich at the occasion of the Exposition of Electricity in the Glaspalast organised by Oskar von Miller. There he transmitted 1.5 kW at 2 kV over a distance of 35 miles.

Deprez conducted experiments in La Chapelle, Grenoble, Vizille, Paris, and Creil. He eventually attained transmission over thirty-five miles for industrial purposes. In 1889, René Thury continued his approach of arranging generators in series, eventually developing commercial systems delivering 20 megawatts at 125 kV over 230 kilometers.

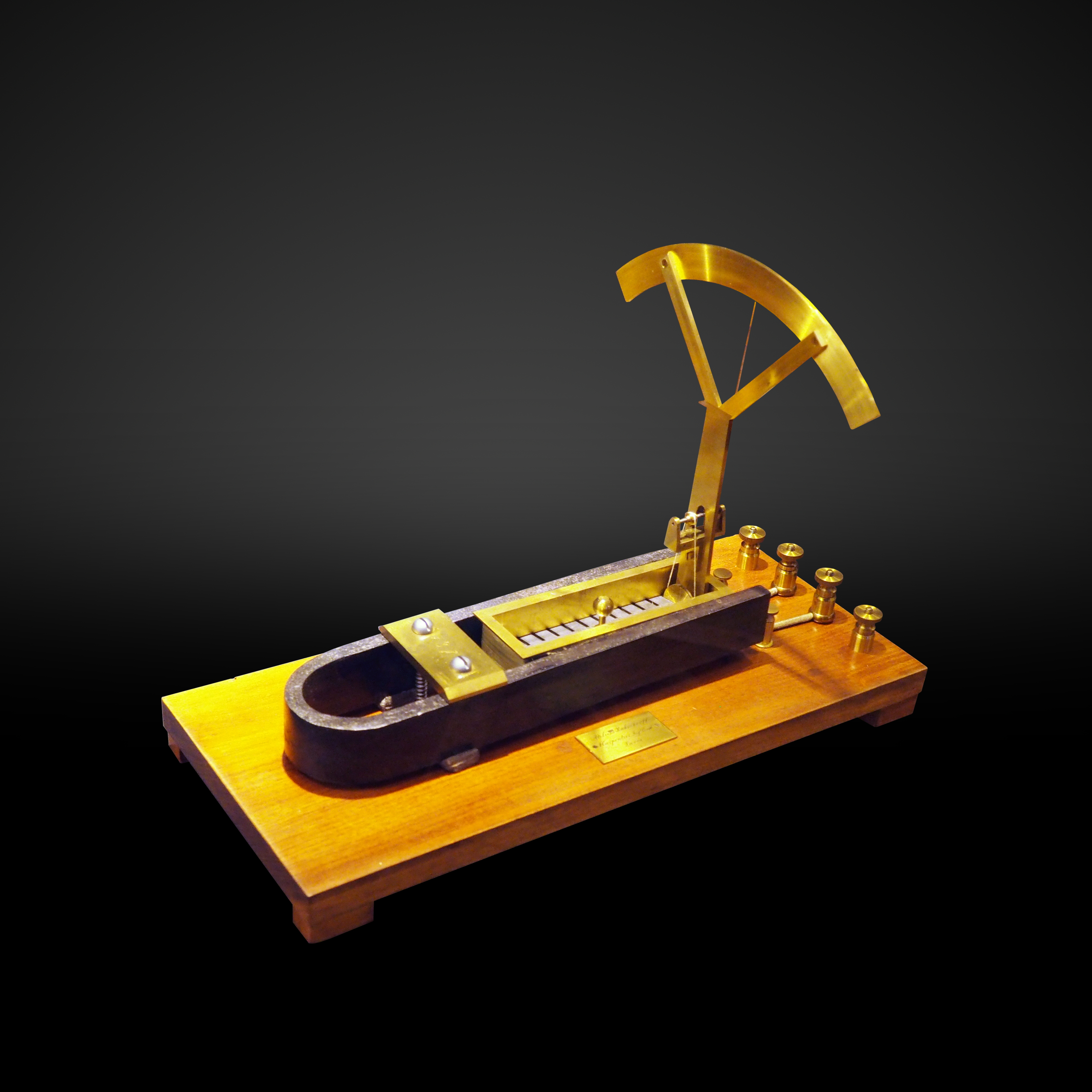
Deprez's and Carpentier's "fishbone" galvanometer (MHS Geneva)
