= Saignelégier–La Chaux-de-Fonds Railway =

Former railway company in Switzerland

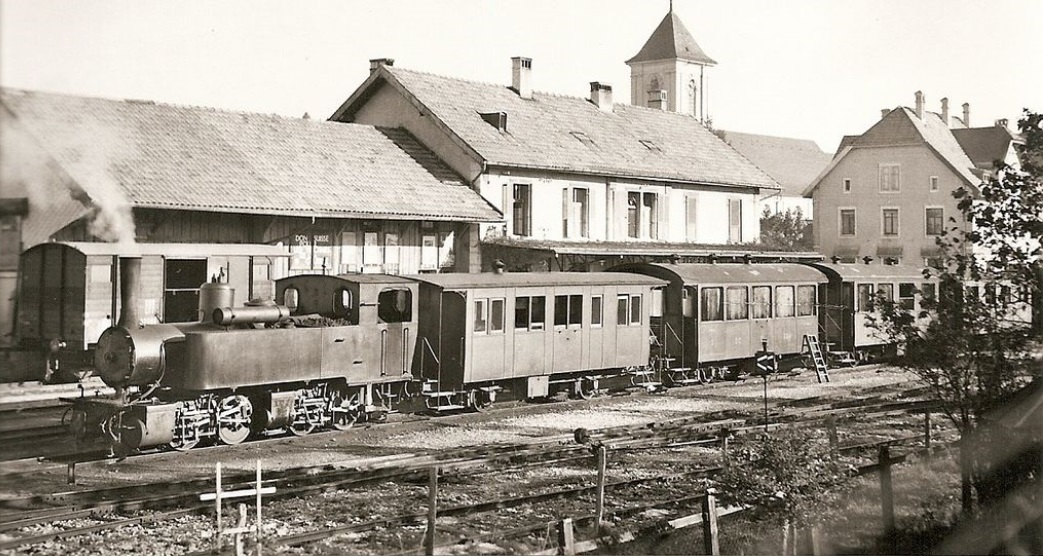
- SC train hauled by Mallet locomotive G 2x2/2 no. 4 in Saignelégier

Overview
- Locale: Switzerland

Service
- Route number: 236

Technical
- Line length: 26.44 km (16.43 mi)
- Track gauge: 1,000 mm (3 ft 3 3/8 in) metre gauge
- Electrification: since 1953: 1500 V DC overhead catenary
- Maximum incline: 4.0%

The Saignelégier–La Chaux-de-Fonds Railway (French: Chemin de fer Saignelégier–La Chaux-de-Fonds; SC) was a railway company that operated a metre-gauge railway from Saignelégier to La Chaux-de-Fonds in western Switzerland. In 1944, the railway was merged to form the Chemins de fer du Jura (CJ), which electrified it at 1500 Volt DC in 1953. Its line is now part of the La Chaux-de-Fonds–Glovelier line.

== History ==
The first main lines in the Jura were built primarily to connect to France and did not serve the Franches-Montagnes. The then Saignelégier–La Chaux-de-Fonds Railway opened its metre-gauge line from Saignelégier via Le Noirmont to La Chaux-de-Fonds-Est on 7 December 1892. The extension to La Chaux-de-Fonds on the Jura–Simplon Railways had to wait until 28 November 1893, when the Hotel de Ville rail and road bridge was finished. This also created a connection to the also narrow-gauge Ponts–Sagne–La Chaux-de-Fonds Railway (PSC). The railway originally had no significant engineering structures except for the Hotel-de-Ville bridge.

=== Connection of other lines ===
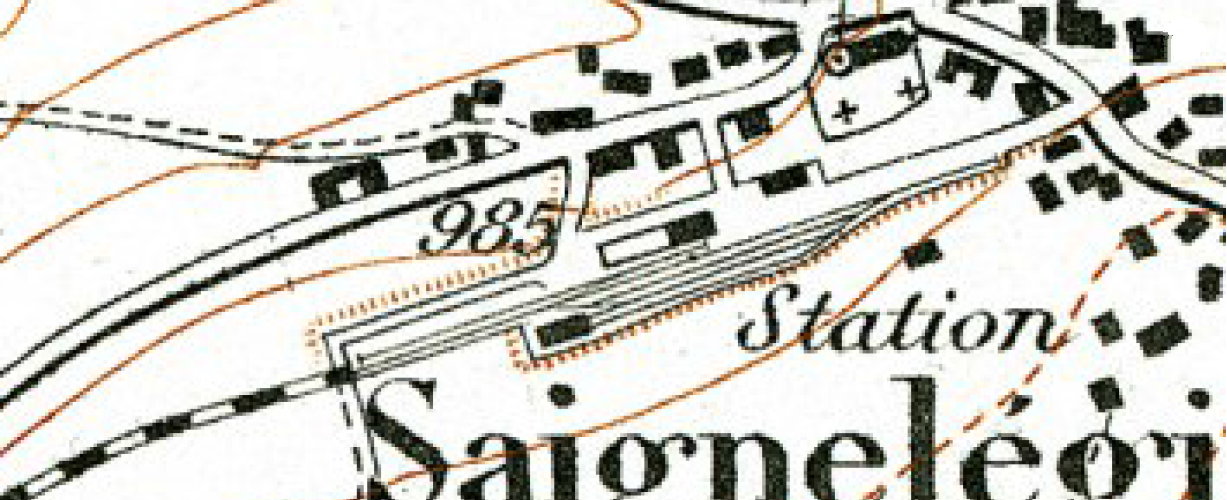
By 1904, Saignelégier was the terminus of the narrow gauge railway from La Chaux-de-Fonds.

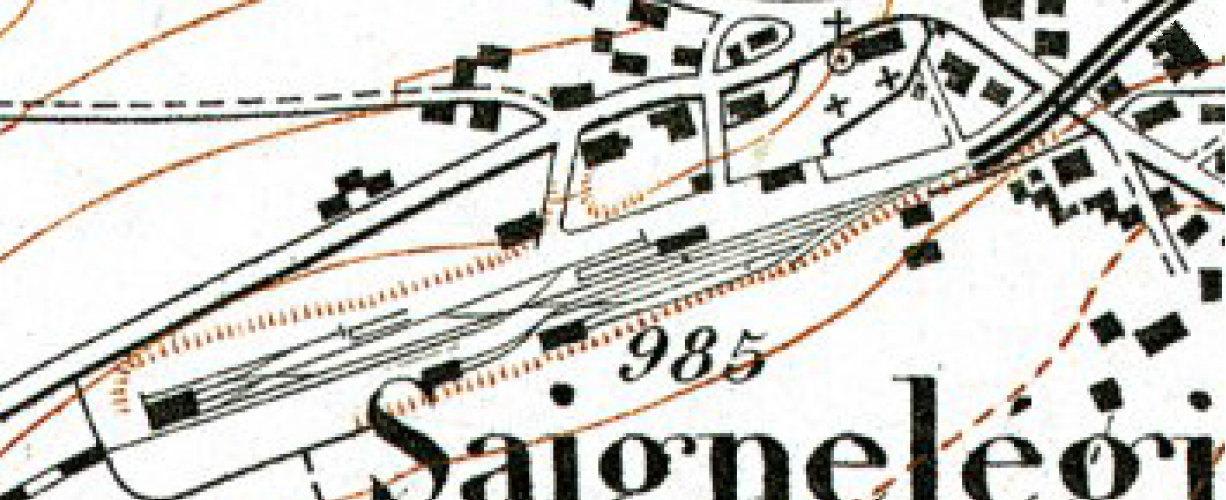
With the opening of the standard gauge RSG, Saignelégier became an interchange station with a complicated track layout.

In 1904, the Régional Saignelégier–Glovelier (RSG) took over operations, creating an important connection to the Basel–Delémont–Glovelier–Porrentruy main line, which continued to France. However, the Saignelégier–Glovelier line was built as standard gauge to facilitate its extensive livestock and timber transportation. Saignelégier became a transhipment station with an intricate system of tracks. To overcome the different gauges, transporter wagons were used on the Saignelégier–La Chaux-de-Fonds line from May 1915.

The neighbouring Ponts–Sagne–La Chaux-de-Fonds railway (PSC) did not have the best connections despite having the same gauge and a shared station. Nevertheless, the Saignelégier–La Chaux-de-Fonds Railway provided PCS services after 1 July 1913 when the Jura neuchâtelois (JN) was nationalised and incorporated into the SBB.

The Tramelan–Breuleux–Noirmont tramway (TBN) was opened on 15 November 1913. It was an extension of the Tramelan–Tavannes railway (TT), which had opened in 1884. Because unlike the SC, the TBN has been electrically operated since its opening, continuous services between La Chaux -de-Fonds-Bahn and Tavannes were limited. The TBN and TT were merged in 1927 to form the Tavannes–Noirmont Railway (Chemin de fer Tavannes-Noirmontm, CTN).

=== Operating results ===
The main source of income for the Saignelégier–La Chaux-de-Fonds Railway was passenger transport, although freight transport also played an important role. After the second year of operation, the operating results always showed a profit, which was invested as a reserve. The First World War did not affect the financial position either. After the war, however, operating costs rose sharply and its financial situation became precarious. In addition Alsace was returned to France after the war, which made the Basel–Delle line much less important. After 1918, the railway remained in deficit and the facilities and rolling stock became obsolete. To enable a thorough renewal of the line, it merged with the RSC, the CTN and the Régional Porrentruy–Bonfol (RPB) to form the Chemins de fer du Jura (CJ) in 1944.

== Operation by the Chemins de fer du Jura ==
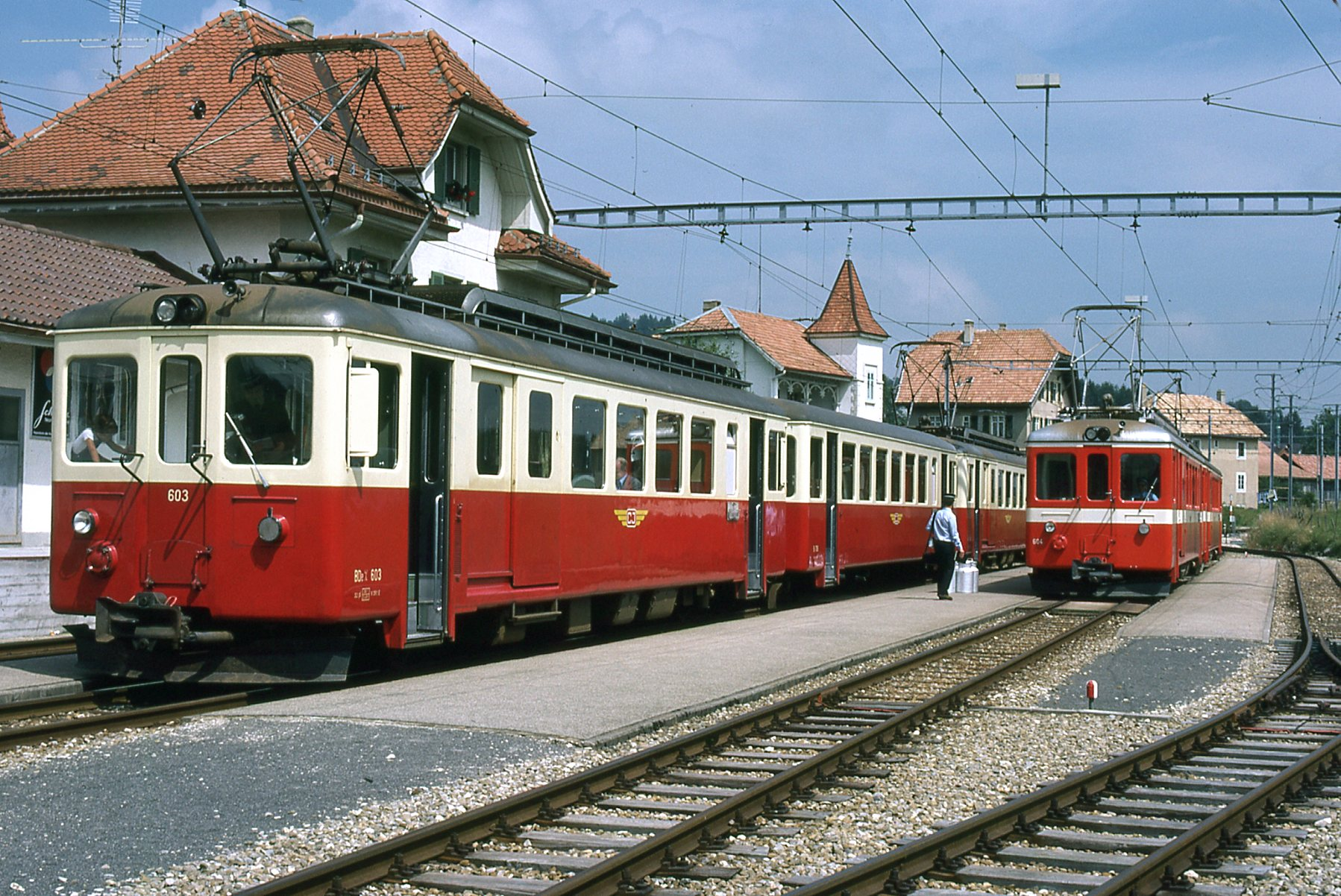
Le Noirment station in 1977. On the left the commuter service to Glovelier, on the right the connecting train to Tavannes.

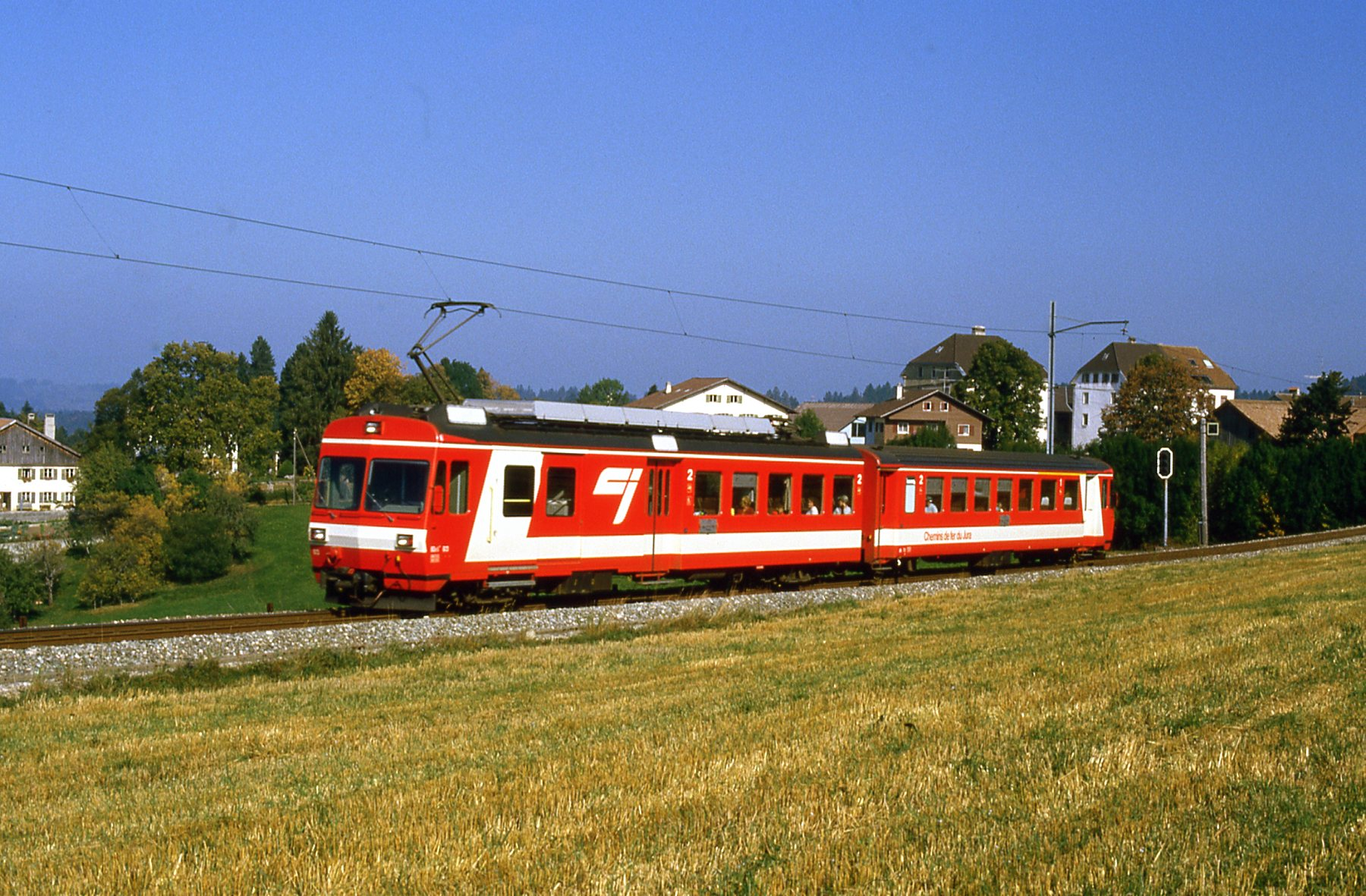
CJ push-pull train of the second generation near Saignelégier.

To simplify operations, the CJ converted the Saignelégier–Glovelier line to metre gauge. After that standard gauge freight wagons were loaded on transporter wagon in Glovelier instead of Saignelégier or alternatively until 2010 in La Chaux-de-Fonds.

The CJ has operated its entire metre-gauge network with 1500 volts DC since 4 October 1953. The rolling stock was replaced almost completely by new sets. The two substations in La Ferrière and Le Noirmont supply the line with electricity.

Although the CJ has the same electricity system as the neighbouring La Chaux-de-Fonds–Les Ponts-de-Martel railway, only a few vehicles are exchanged between the CJ and Transports Régionaux Neuchâtelois (TRN). TRN vehicles regularly access the CJ network in order to reprofile their wheels on the underfloor lathe in the CJ Tramelan workshop. In La Chaux-de-Fonds, the CJ and TRN catenaries can be interconnected via a coupling switch to provide power to the neighboring railway in case of emergency.

In 1959, the CJ replaced the steel Hotel-de-Ville Bridge with a concrete structure. The 129 metre-long Ferrière bridge between La Ferrière and Le Seignat was opened in 1979. It replaces an old, very tortuous route.

=== Current operations ===
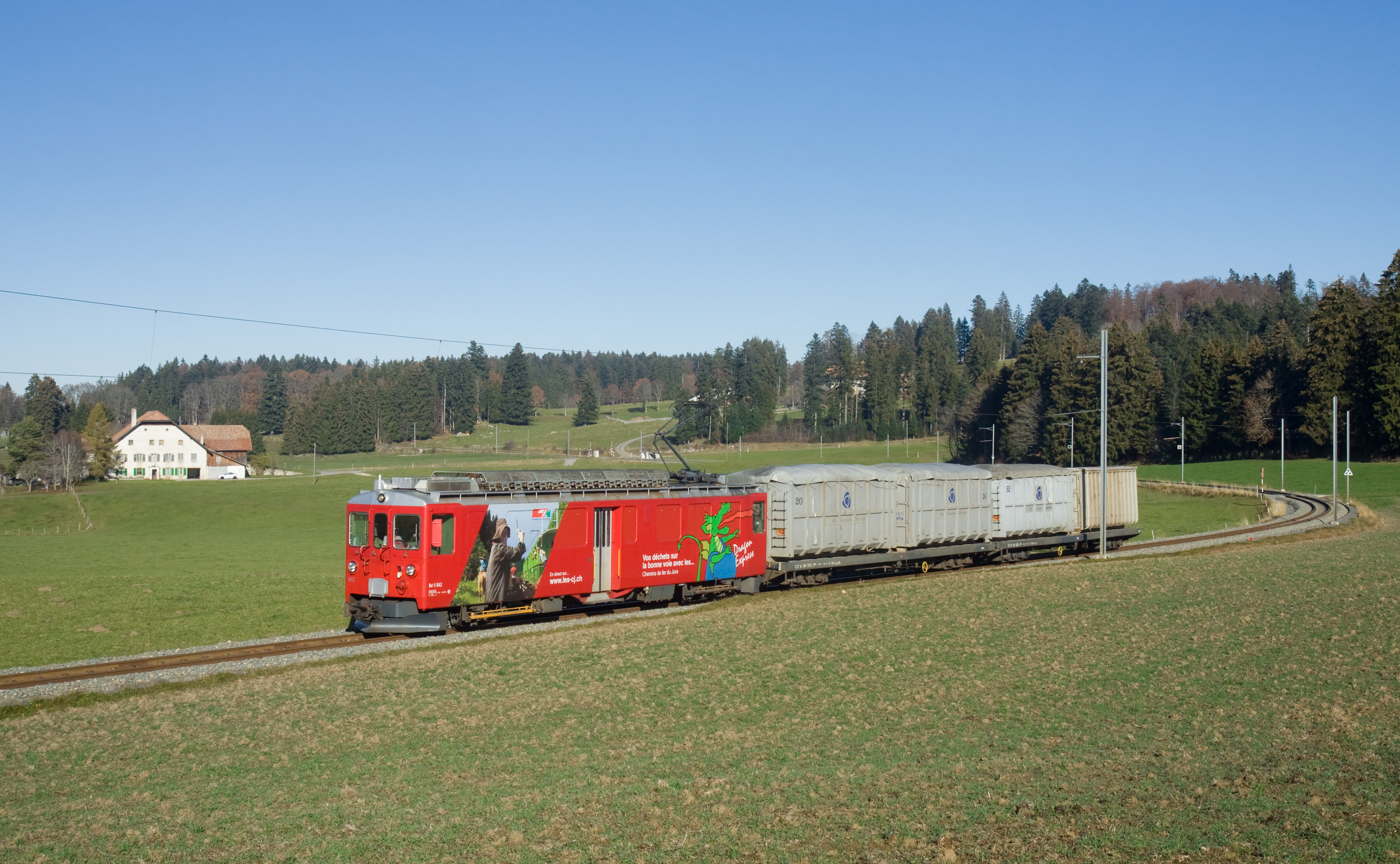
Waste train attached to an ABe 4/4 railcar acquired from the RhB at La Ferrière.

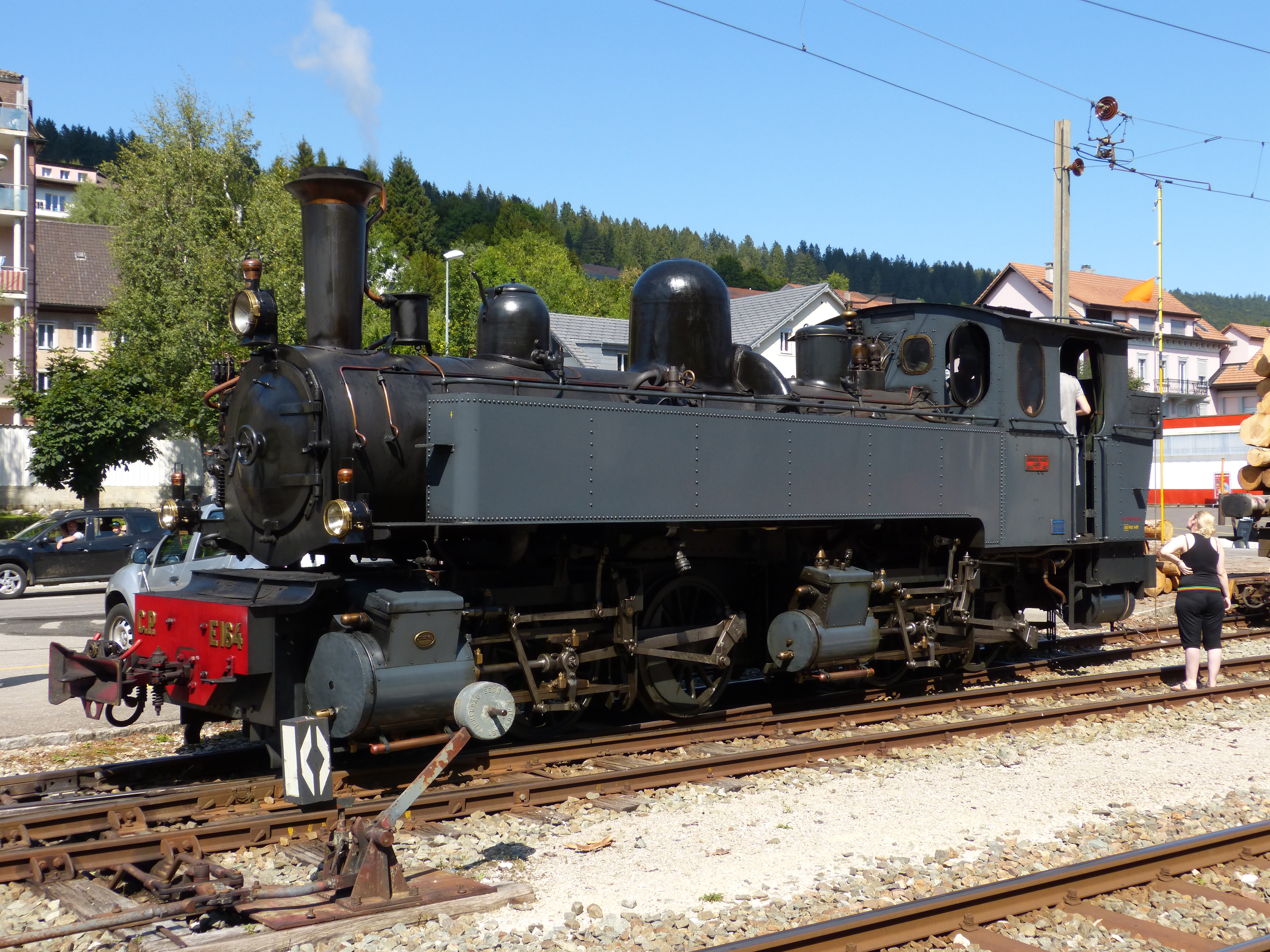
G 2x2/2 E 164 steam locomotive, used by La Traction for steam haulage.

The La Chaux-de-Fonds–Saignelégier–Glovelier passenger trains run almost continuously every hour. In Le Noirment, they connect with trains to Tavannes. The Marché-Concours national de chevaux horse race takes place in Saignelégier in August.

Freight trains run regularly on the line from Monday to Friday. Garbage has been carried from Glovelier to the incinerator in La Chaux-de-Fonds since 2000. In addition, standard-gauge wagons are carried on transporter wagons, which primarily carry timber logs, fuel oil, gravel and road salt. Scheduled steam trains are operated by La Traction from Pré-Petitjean to Glovelier, Tavannes or La Chaux-de-Fonds from July to September.

In Saignelégier there is a depot for the maintenance of rolling stock used in regular traffic. Construction service vehicles are maintained at a single-track carriage shed in Le Noirmont.

== Route description ==
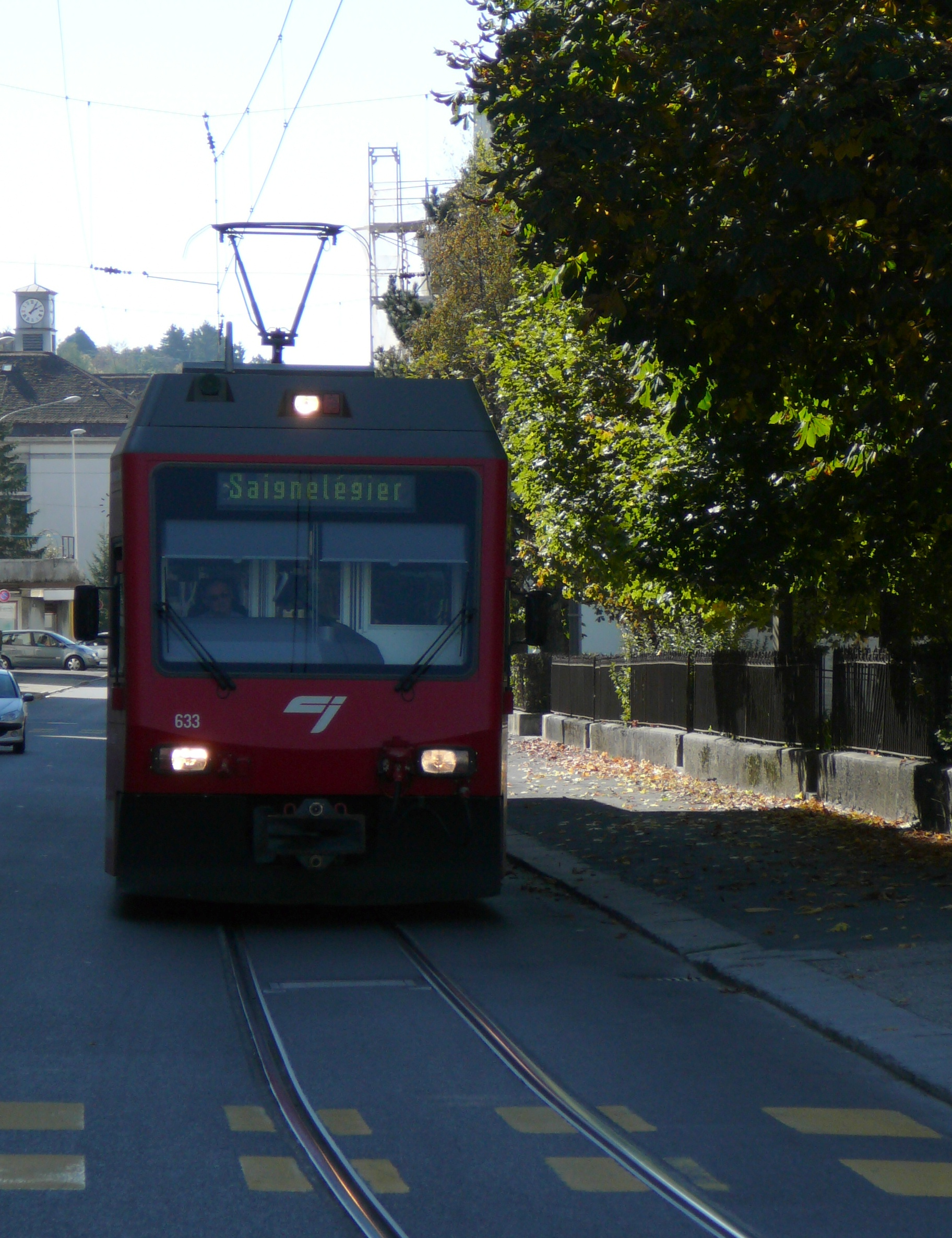
Modern GTW train of the CJ on the on-street section in La Chaux-de-Fonds.

The 27-kilometre-long line connects Saignelégier in the Canton of Jura with the watchmaking town of La Chaux-de-Fonds in the Neuchâtel. Shortly after leaving Saignelégier, passengers see the deep valley of the Doubs and behind it the high plateau of Maîche, which is in France. Passing the small towns of Muriaux and Les Emibois, the trains reach Le Noirmont, where the line from Tavannes joins on the left. A cardiac clinic is visible on the ridges to the right.

The line to Les Bois crosses forest pastures at around 1000 metres above sea level. The belfry of the church of Les Bois is typical of the neighboring Franche-Comté. Between La Large-Journée and La Chaux d'Abel, the railway crosses the cantonal border to reach La Ferrière in the Canton of Bern. The line reaches the Canton of Neuchâtel immediately before the former halt of Le Seignat. After passing through the crossing station of La Cibourg, the trains run along a winding stretch of line to reach the highest point of the line at Bellevue at 1072 metres above sea level. The line then runs through a pine forest to La Chaux-de-Fonds, where trains run through the street to the station. Just before the La Chaux-de-Fonds station, the line moves off the street and the railway runs parallel to the SBB lines from Neuchâtel and Biel and the metre-gauge line from Les Ponts-de-Martel to the terminus.

== Rolling stock of the Saignelégier–La Chaux-de-Fonds Railway ==
Locomotives of the SC	G 2x2/2		G 3/3
Numbering:	4 – 6	7	9
Wheel arrangement:	B'B		C
Length over buffer:	7480 mm	7740 mm	6140 mm
Fixed wheelbase:	1150 mm	1150 mm	2200 mm
Total wheelbase:	4000 mm	4050 mm	2200 mm
Service weight:	24.0 t	27.1 t	20 t
Adhesive weight:	24.0 t	27.1 t	20 t
Maximum speed:	30 km/h		35 km/h
Driving wheel diameter:	900 mm		750 mm
Inside cylinder diameter:	250 mm		300 mm
Outside cylinder diameter:	380 mm		300 mm
Piston stroke:	460 mm		350 mm
Boiler pressure:	12 atm	14 atm	13 atm
Grate area:	0.7 m^{2}		0.7 m^{2}
Superheater area:	3.8 m^{2}	3.7 m^{2}	7.5 m^{2}
Total heating surface:	42.0 m^{2}	45.3 m^{2}	38.5 m^{2}
Water supply:	3.0 m³		2.2 m³
Coal supply:	0.6 t	0.9 t	0.6 t

=== G 2x2/2 no. 4 – 7 ===
The Arnold Jung Lokomotivfabrik in Jungenthal, Germany delivered two four-axle Mallet locomotive G 2x2/2 no. 4 and 5 with the names of Pouillerel and Spiegelberg for the commencement of operations of the Saignelégier–La Chaux-de-Fonds line in 1892. The first revision was obtained in 1894, when a third locomotive Franches-Montagnes was procured and given the number 6. In 1900, Jung delivered the last locomotive, no. 7, Jura. The numbers 4 to 7 continued on from the locomotive numbers of the Ponts–Sagne–La Chaux-de-Fonds Railway, as the two companies had an operating arrangement.

The G 2x2/2 had an axle load of only 6 tonnes. Apparently it ordered the first locomotive to handle bad track conditions, because the operating program of the Mallet locomotives could also have been achieved this with a simpler 3/3-coupled locomotive.

Locomotive no. 5 was destroyed on 29 October 1944 during an allied air raid on Le Noirmont, despite Switzerland's neutrality. The other three Mallet locomotives were taken out of service after electrification in 1953 and scrapped in 1954.

=== G 3/3 No. 9 ===
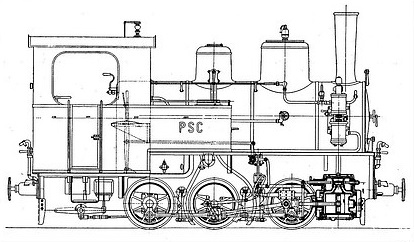
G 3/3 no. 9, previously locomotive no. 6 of the PSC

After the bombing of the locomotive 5, the SC needed a replacement. In 1951 it was able to acquire steam locomotive G 3/3 6 from the Ponts-Sagne-La Chaux-de-Fonds Railway, which became redundant after the electrification of 1950. It was delivered by the Swiss Locomotive and Machine Works (SLM) in 1915. Since the company had already used number 6, the number plates were turned upside down to produce a 9. With the electrification of the Chemins de fer du Jura, locomotive 9 became surplus and was scrapped in 1956.
