= Vereinigte Drahtwerke =

Swiss wire manufacturer

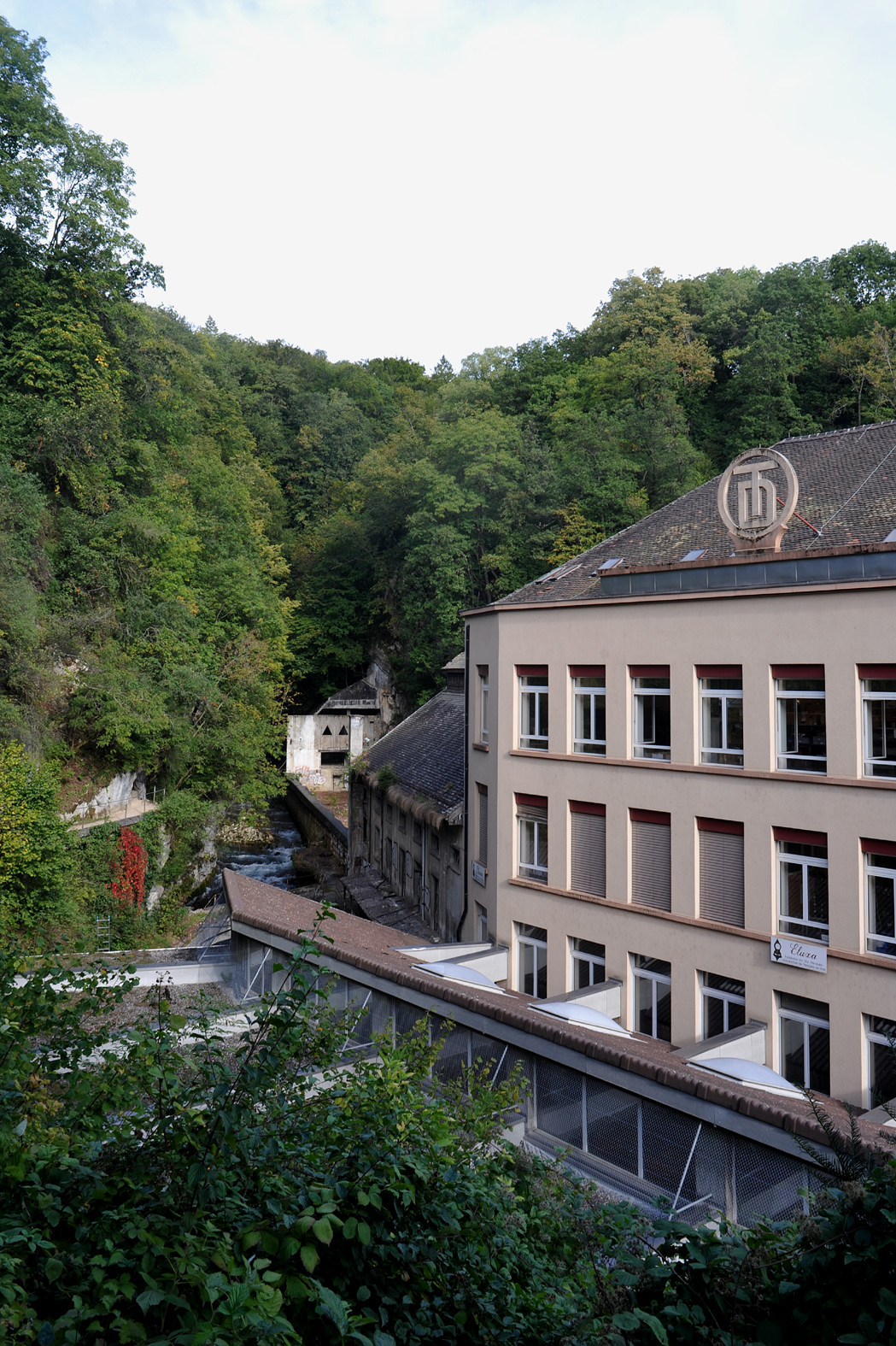
- Buildings of the former Vereinigte Drahtwerke in the Taubenloch Gorge
- Type: Joint-stock company
- Industry: Wire manufacturing
- Founded: 1914 (merger)
- Fate: Production ceased (1990); became a finance and real estate company, merged into Espace Real Estate AG (2001)
- Headquarters: Biel/Bienne, Switzerland
- Products: Drawn wire

The Vereinigte Drahtwerke was a Swiss wire manufacturer based in Biel/Bienne. Formed in 1914, it traced its origins to early mills and wire-drawing works near Boujean and gained importance during the two world wars.

== History ==
A mill (the Lochmühle) had existed since 1347 beside the Bellelay mill, where the Suze emerges from the Jura near Boujean (today part of Biel/Bienne). It was supplemented by a forge in 1622 and a wire-drawing works in 1634. The business prospered and extended its commercial activities as far as Lyon. Owned by the Bloesch and Schwab families from 1850 to 1914, it merged in 1914 with the wire-drawing works that Constant Montandon of Travers had created in 1852 at the Brühl in Madretsch (today part of Biel/Bienne).

The new firm, called Vereinigte Drahtwerke AG Biel, acquired a certain importance during the two world wars. In 1987 it was taken over and transformed by the firm Zurmont Finanz AG. Production ceased in 1990 and the company became a finance and real estate company, which merged in 2001 with the Espace Real Estate AG group, created in 2000.

== Bibliography ==
- F. Schwab, 300 Jahre Drahtindustrie, 1934
- M. and W. Bourquin, Biel, stadtgeschichtliches Lexikon, 1999, 86–87
