= Maccia gens =

Minor plebeian family at ancient Rome

The Gens Maccia was a minor plebeian family at ancient Rome. The only member of this gens appearing in Roman writers is the famous playwright Titus Maccius Plautus, but a number of Macci are known from inscriptions.

== Origin ==
The nomen Maccius is likely of Umbrian or Oscan origin. The playwright Plautus was from Sarsina in Umbria, and a number of inscriptions of this gens place them in and around Pompeii in Campania, and elsewhere in southern Italy. Chase gives Macius, with one 'c', among names known to be of Oscan origin, noting a possible connection with the surnames Macus and Macio, and the Oscan name Magius.

== Praenomina ==
The Maccii used a variety of common praenomina, with several instances of Publius, Lucius, Titus, and Marcus, and individual instances of Aulus, Numerius, Quintus, and Sextus. All of these were frequently used throughout Roman history except for Numerius, which was comparatively uncommon at all periods. One of the Maccii bears the unusual filiation Papi f., but it is uncertain if Papus was his father's praenomen, or perhaps a surname.

== Branches and cognomina ==
The only cognomen borne by any of the Maccii under the Republic was Plautus, originally designating someone who was flat-footed. It was one of an abundant class of surnames derived from an individual's physical features or peculiarities. Various cognomina appear among the Maccii of imperial times, including Sabinus, indicating someone claiming descent from or otherwise resembling one of the Sabines, Festus, indicating someone happy or cheerful, and Severus, "stern", the two latter perhaps belonging to a pair of brothers. Other surnames were derived from gentilicia, probably those of maternal ancestors.

== Members ==
This list includes abbreviated praenomina. For an explanation of this practice, see filiation.

- Titus Maccius Plautus, the famous playwright of the third and second century BC. Many of his plays have survived.
- Maccius A. f., buried at Luceria in Apulia, in a tomb dating from the middle of the first century BC. The sepulchral inscription describes him as the patron of someone whose name has not been preserved, and also mentions a Maccia whose relationship to him has also not survived.
- Maccia, named in the sepulchral inscription of Maccius, the son of Aulus, from Luceria, dating from the middle of the first century BC.
- Lucius Maccius Papi f., buried at Pompeii in Campania, along with his wife, Spellia, and daughter-in-law, Epidia, in a family sepulchre dating from the latter half of the first century BC.
- Publius Maccius L. f. Papi n., dedicated a family sepulchre at Pompeii, dating from the latter half of the first century BC, for his parents, Lucius Maccius and Spellia, and his wife, Epidia. The inscription also names his heirs as Publius Maccius Velasianus and Publius Maccius Mamianus Fubzanus.
- Publius Maccius Mamianus Fubzanus, along with Publius Maccius Velasianus, one of the heirs of Publius Maccius, whose family sepulchre at Pompeii dates from the latter half of the first century BC.
- Publius Maccius Velasianus, along with Publius Maccius Mamianus Fubzanus, one of the heirs of Publius Maccius, whose family sepulchre at Pompeii dates from the latter half of the first century BC.
- Marcus Maccius Sabinus, made an offering to Mars at the present site of Frinvillier, formerly part of Germania Superior, dating from the first or second century.
- Maccius, named in a pottery inscription from the site of modern Erlach, formerly part of Germania Superior, dating between the first and third centuries.
- Maccia T. f. Exorata, named in a sepulchral inscription from the present site of Ferrara, then in Cisalpine Gaul, dating from the middle part of the first century.
- Publius Maccius P. f. Melas, together with Gaius Tillius Rufus, one of the municipal duumvirs at Pompeii.
- Maccius Modestus, together with Julius Maternus, a soldier, and one of the heirs of Marcus Aquinius Verinus, an optio in the thirteenth urban cohort. They built a tomb for him at Lugdunum in Gallia Lugdunensis, dating from the first half of the second century.
- Maccius Paternanus, buried along with Tertius Divixtus at the present site of Horbourg-Wihr, formerly part of Germania Superior, in a tomb dating from the late second or early third century.

=== Undated Maccii ===
- Maccius, a potter whose name has been found on multiple ceramics from Gallia Belgica, Aquitania and Britannia.
- Maccius, named in a sepulchral inscription from Samarobriva in Belgica.
- Maccius, along with his wife, Tertulla, dedicated a tomb at Nemausus in Gallia Narbonensis for their daughter, Maccia Saturnina.
- Numerius Maccius L. f., a quaestor named in on an amphora from Brundisium in Calabria.
- Lucius Maccius Aeternus, one of the duumvirs of an unknown town in Gallia Lugdunensis, made an offering to the local god, Gobannus.
- Marcus Maccius Festus, together with Sextus Maccius Severus, dedicated a tomb at Cabellio in Gallia Narbonensis for Sextus Cornelius, a slave born in their household.
- Maccia Januaria, along with her daughter-in-law, Licinia Carpime, dedicated a tomb at Massilia in Gallia Narbonensis for her son, Titus Maccius Marcellus.
- Titus Maccius Marcellus, buried at Massilia, in a tomb built by his mother, Maccia Januaria, and wife, Licinia Carpime.
- Maccius Regillus, together with Domitia Felicissima, built a tomb for their foster son, Domitius Macarius, at Antipolis in Gallia Narbonensis.
- Maccia Saturnina, buried at Nemausus, in a tomb dedicated by her parents, Maccius and Tertulla.
- Sextus Maccius Severus, together with Marcus Maccius Festus, dedicated a tomb at Cabellio for Sextus Cornelius, a slave born in their household.
- Quintus Maccius Virilis, named in an inscription from Cularo in Gallia Narbonensis.

== See also ==
- List of Roman gentes

== Bibliography ==
- Theodor Mommsen et alii, Corpus Inscriptionum Latinarum (The Body of Latin Inscriptions, abbreviated CIL), Berlin-Brandenburgische Akademie der Wissenschaften (1853–present).
- Notizie degli Scavi di Antichità (News of Excavations from Antiquity, abbreviated NSA), Accademia dei Lincei (1876–present).
- Bulletin Archéologique du Comité des Travaux Historiques et Scientifiques (Archaeological Bulletin of the Committee on Historic and Scientific Works, abbreviated BCTH), Imprimerie Nationale, Paris (1885–1973).
- René Cagnat et alii, L'Année épigraphique (The Year in Epigraphy, abbreviated AE), Presses Universitaires de France (1888–present).
- Hermann Finke, "Neue Inschriften", in Berichte der Römisch-Germanischen Kommission, vol. xvii, pp. 1–107, 198–231 (1927).
- La Carte Archéologique de la Gaule (Archaeological Map of Gaul, abbreviated CAG), Académie des Inscriptions et Belles-Lettres (1931–present).
- D.P. Simpson, Cassell's Latin and English Dictionary, Macmillan Publishing Company, New York (1963).
