= Frinvillier =

Village in the Canton of Bern, district of Courtelary

Coordinates: 47.1692°N 7.25519°E

Frinvillier, in German Friedliswart, is a village in the Canton of Bern, district of Courtelary. Its populations is around 185 people. It belongs to the Bernese Jura, on the territory of the community Vauffelin.

== Tourism ==
In Frinvillier starts the path leaving the Jura Mountains into the Taubenloch gorge, dug out by the Suze, till Biel/Bienne on the Swiss Plateau.
