= La Chaux-d'Abel railway station =

Railway station in La Ferrière, Switzerland

La Chaux-d'Abel
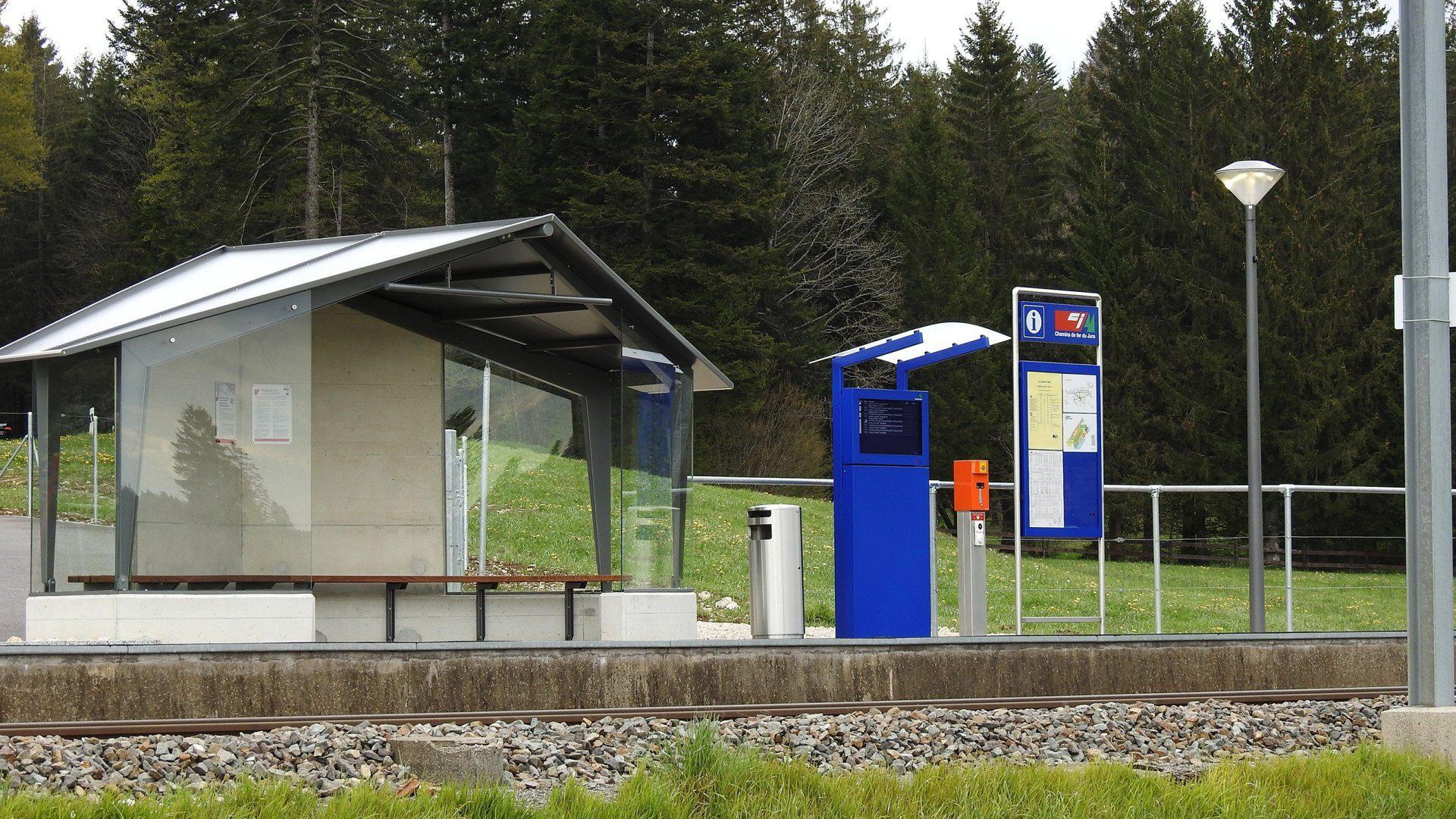
- The station shelter in 2019

General information
- Location: La Ferrière, Bern; Switzerland
- Coordinates: 47°09′11″N 6°53′56″E
- Elevation: 994 m (3,261 ft)
- Owner: Chemins de fer du Jura
- Line: La Chaux-de-Fonds–Glovelier line
- Distance: 33.5 km (20.8 mi) from Tavannes
- Platforms: 1 side platform
- Tracks: 1
- Train operators: Chemins de fer du Jura

Construction
- Accessible: Yes

Other information
- Station code: 8500181 (CHXA)
- Fare zone: 31 (Onde Verte)

Services
Preceding station	Chemins de fer du Jura	Following station
La Ferrière towards La Chaux-de-Fonds	R36	La Large-Journée towards Glovelier
Location
- Location within Switzerland Location within Canton of Bern

La Chaux-d'Abel railway station (French: Gare de La Chaux-d'Abel) is a railway station in the municipality of La Ferrière, in the Swiss canton of Bern. It is an intermediate stop and a request stop on the 1,000 mm (3 ft 3 3/8 in) metre gauge La Chaux-de-Fonds–Glovelier line of the Chemins de fer du Jura.

== Services ==
As of the December 2023 timetable change, the following services stop at La Chaux-d'Abel:

- Regio: hourly service between La Chaux-de-Fonds and Glovelier.
