= Erguel Castle =

Castle in Sonvilier, Bern, Switzerland

- Château d'Erguël
- Sonvilier, Canton of Bern, Switzerland
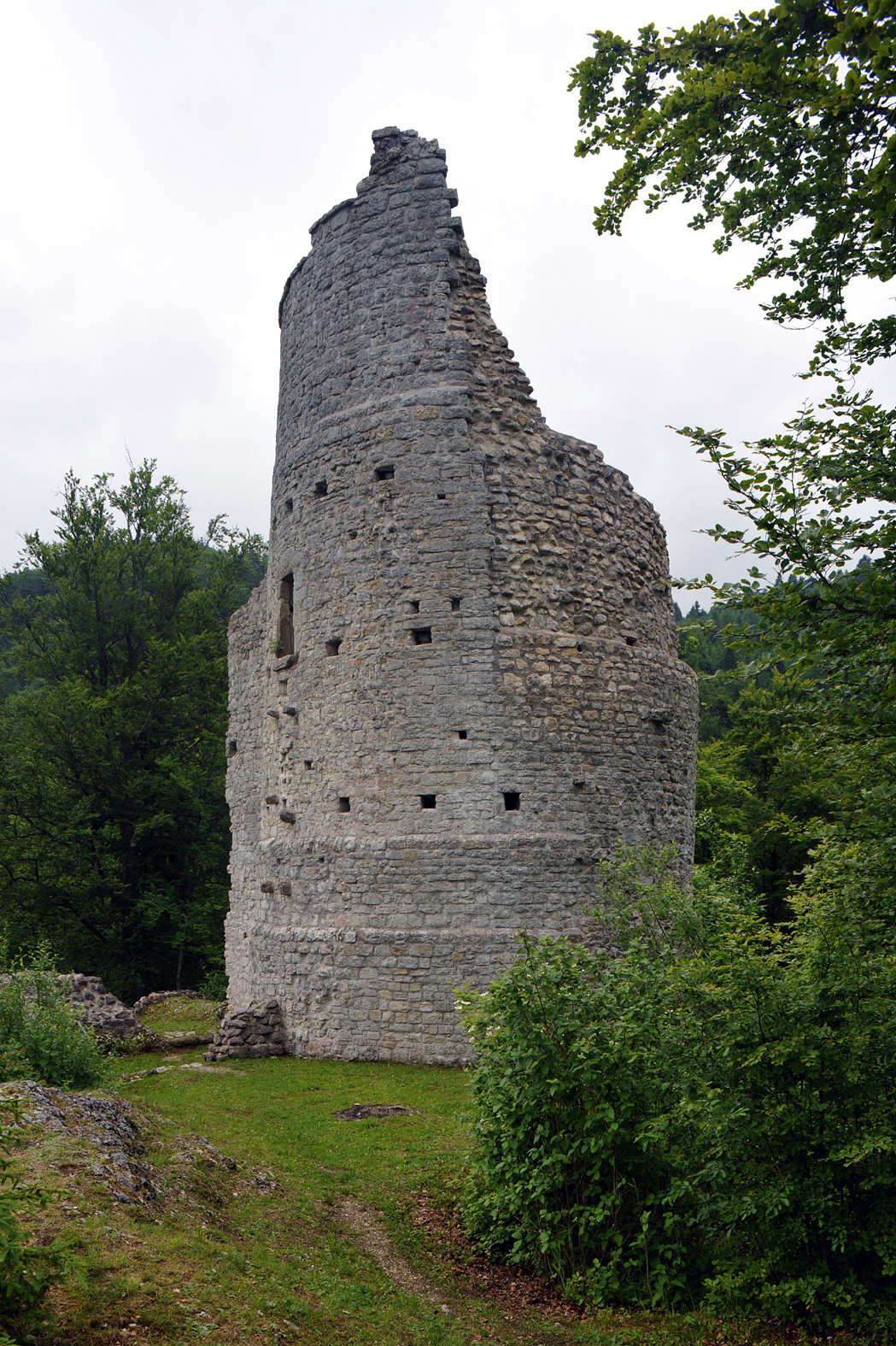
- Ruins of Erguel Castle

Site information
- Open to the public: yes
- Condition: ruined

Location
- Location within Switzerland
- Coordinates: 47.13567°N 6.97708°E

Site history
- Built: before 1264, most likely 11th century

Erguel Castle (French: Château d'Erguël) is a ruined castle in the municipality of Sonvilier in the canton of Bern in Switzerland. It is the best preserved castle ruin in the French-speaking Bernese Jura.

== History ==
During the 11th century, the Lords of Erguel, or Arguel, moved from Franche-Comté and settled in the village of Sonvilier. Exactly when they built Erguel Castle on a hill south-east of the village is unknown, but in 1178 and 1184 Heinrich von Erguël was mentioned ruling over the region. The knights of Erguel owned land in the surrounding valley and held the vogt office over the church at Saint-Imier. The family kept the castle, the surrounding land and the lordship until 1264 when Otto von Erguel, who at the time lived in Basel, ceded them to the Prince-Bishop of Basel. In return the bishop granted him lands in Alsace.

The bishop appointed a bailiff for the castle, but administered the extended lands out of Biel. The castle was the southernmost point in the episcopal dominion. Under Bishop Heinrich of Isny (1275-1286) the castle was strengthened and expanded. The currently visible parts of the castle probably all date to this construction period. It can be assumed that the visible parts of the plant today to go back to that time.

In 1368 Bishop Johann of Venningen went to war against Bern. Troops from Bern and Biel attacked, captured and burned Erguel Castle. It must have been rebuilt, since in 1417 there was a castellan at the castle. Later, it was used as a prison for several decades. In 1617 Bishop Wilhelm Rinck of Baldenstein repaired the castle and stationed a garrison there to protect his land against the city of Biel. During the Thirty Years War, in 1636, it was used as housing and storage for Swedish troops.

In 1750, the diocese decided to lease the half-ruined castle. However, the lease contained the condition that the dilapidated building must be well maintained and they were unable to find a tenant. Four years later, the diocese decided to just abandon it and let the castle collapse. The castle estates were awarded to the municipality of La Ferrière in 1767 and acquired in 1847 by the municipality of Sonvilier.

During the 19th and 20th centuries there were several archeological digs and attempts to preserve the site. The first excavations were carried out on the castle grounds in 1884. The walls were repaired in 1929-1931 and 1964-1965. The most recent complete renovation of the ruins was in 1997-1998.

== Castle site ==
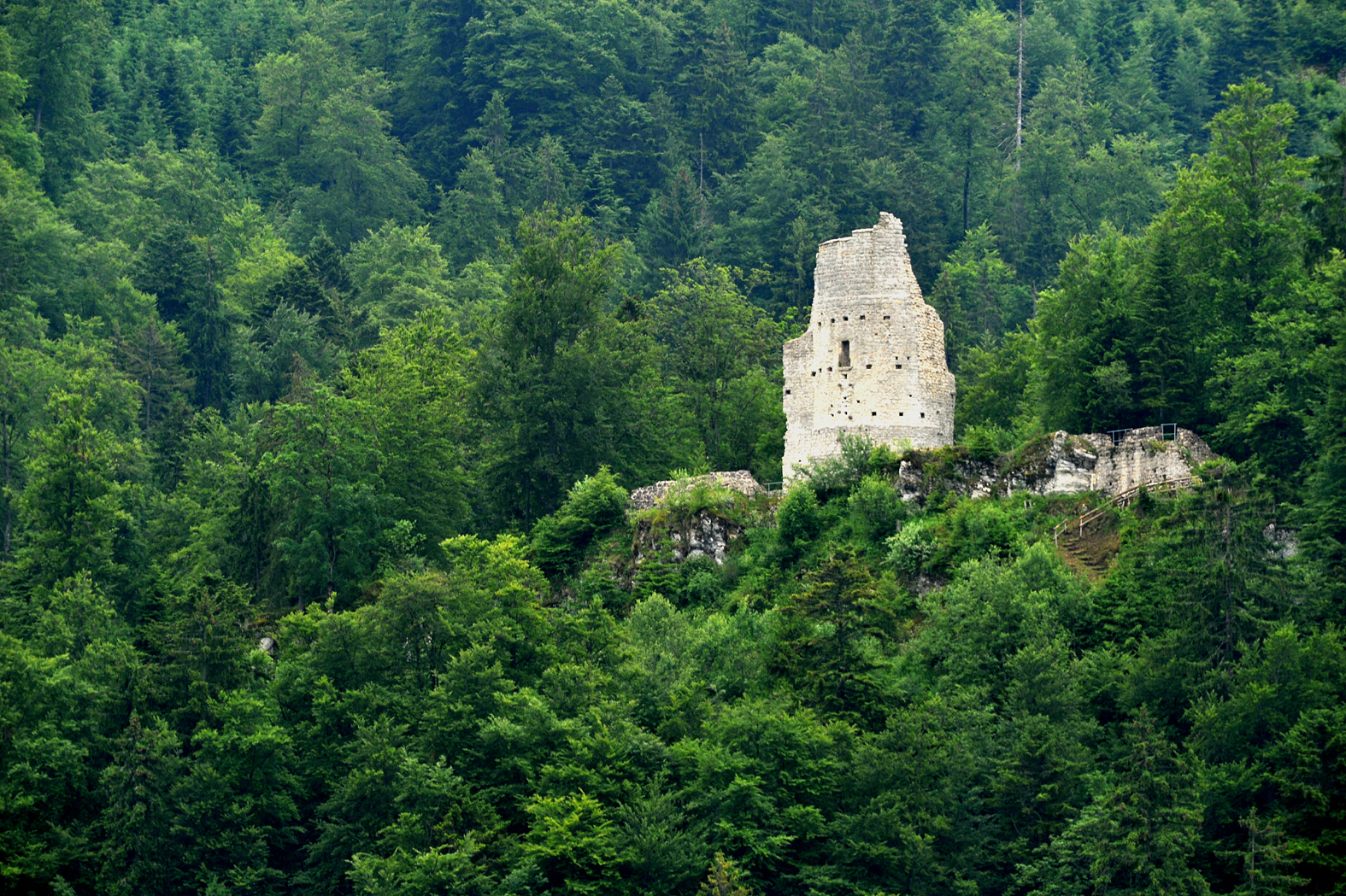
View to the ruins from Sonvilier

The castle is a long, narrow structure that runs east-west on an exposed hilltop south of Sonvilier. The castle gate house is on the eastern side of site and is still visible. A large, round bergfried is south and west of the gate house. The tower has 3 meters (9.8 ft) thick walls at the base and was probably about 30 m (98 ft) tall though only part of the tower still exists. The living quarters and court stretch west of the gate house and bergfried. Portions of the walls of the chapel, stable and kitchens in the living quarters still exist. A map from 1617 indicated that there was a semi-circular tower as the western end of the castle, but no trace of the tower still exists.

== See also ==
- List of castles in Switzerland
- Erguel
