= Renan, Switzerland =

Renan
- Municipality
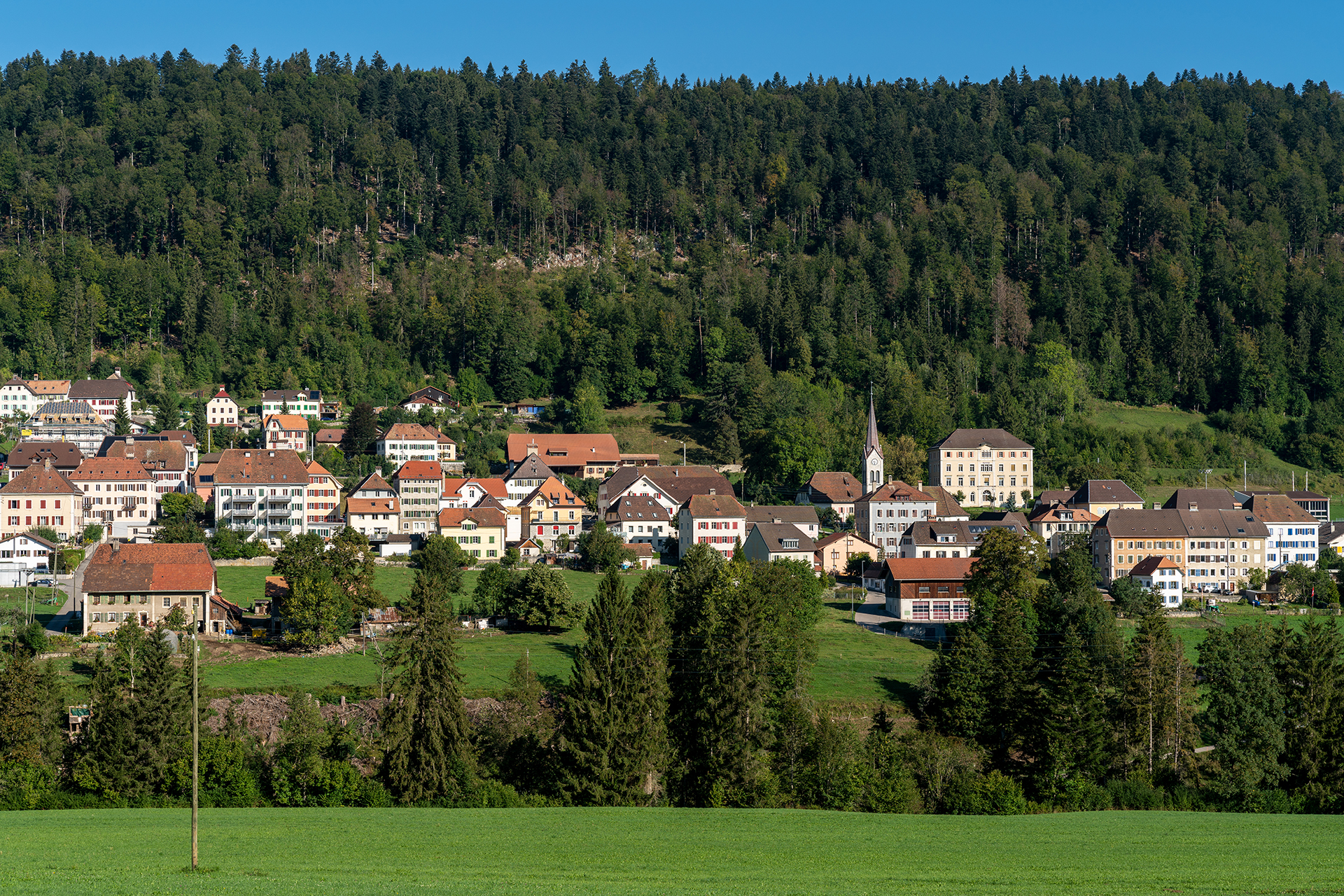

- Flag Coat of arms
- Location of Renan
- Location within Switzerland Location within Canton of Bern
- Coordinates: 47°8′N 6°56′E
- Country: Switzerland
- Canton: Bern
- District: Jura bernois

Government
  - Mayor: Maire; Pierre-André Theubet

Area
  - Total: 12.62 km^{2} (4.87 sq mi)
- Elevation: 907 m (2,976 ft)

Population (December 2020)
  - Total: 934
  - Density: 74.0/km^{2} (192/sq mi)
- Time zone: UTC+01:00 (CET)
  - Summer (DST): UTC+02:00 (CEST)
- Postal code: 2616
- SFOS number: 441
- ISO 3166 code: CH-BE
- Surrounded by: La Ferrière, Sonvilier, Chézard-Saint-Martin, Cernier, Fontaines, La Chaux-de-Fonds (NE)
- Website: www.renan.ch

Renan is a municipality in the Jura bernois administrative district in the canton of Bern in Switzerland. It is located in the French-speaking Bernese Jura (Jura Bernois).

== History ==
Aerial view from 100 m by Walter Mittelholzer (1925)

Renan is first mentioned in 1372 as Renens. The municipality was formerly known by its German name Rennen, however, that name is no longer used.

The village was owned by the collegiate church of Saint-Imier which was part of the seigniory of Erguel under the Prince-Bishop of Basel. After the 1797 French victory and the Treaty of Campo Formio, Renan became part of the French Département of Mont-Terrible. A few years later, it became part of the Département of Haut-Rhin. After Napoleon's defeat and the Congress of Vienna, Renan was assigned to the Canton of Bern in 1815. Following an unsuccessful revolt in Neuchâtel in 1831, a number of the insurgents took refuge in Renan. Following the French Revolution of 1848, the people of the neighboring canton of Neuchâtel made preparations for a republican coup. A republican leader Ami Girard raised a body two hundred volunteers and on 1 March 1848 set out from Renan to join the Neuchâtel Revolution. By 8pm that evening, Neuchâtel Castle fell to the volunteers and on 5 March, ambassadors from Switzerland had recognized the new government and the Republic of Neuchatel was formed.

The village was part of the parish of Erguel and converted to the Reformed faith along with the rest of the Erguel. In 1627 the Prince-Bishop approved the construction of a village church in Renan. It was completed in 1631 and was renovated in 1976-77.

During the late 17th century the village economy was booming as the watch industry spread in the Saint-Imier valley. In 1874, the Biel-Les Convers railway connected the village to the national railway network. The Great Depression in the 1930s devastated the Swiss watch industry and the economy of Renan. However, the watch industry held on and grew once again after World War II. In the 1970s the watch industry was once again devastated and this time the local industry did not survive. At the beginning of the 21st century Renan's economy was dominated by agriculture. In 2005, the agricultural sector provided over one-third of all jobs in the municipality.

== Geography ==
Renan has an area of 12.63 km^{2} (4.88 sq mi). Of this area, 7.57 km^{2} (2.92 mi^{2}) or 59.9% is used for agricultural purposes, while 4.24 km^{2} (1.64 mi^{2}) or 33.5% is forested. Of the rest of the land, 0.74 km^{2} (0.29 mi^{2}) or 5.9% is settled (buildings or roads), 0.03 km^{2} (7.4 acres) or 0.2% is either rivers or lakes and 0.03 km^{2} (7.4 acres) or 0.2% is unproductive land.

Of the built up area, housing and buildings made up 3.3% and transportation infrastructure made up 1.9%. Out of the forested land, 29.1% of the total land area is heavily forested and 4.4% is covered with orchards or small clusters of trees. Of the agricultural land, 7.7% is used for growing crops and 37.0% is pastures and 14.8% is used for alpine pastures. All the water in the municipality is flowing water.

The municipality is located in the upper Saint-Imier valley. The high valley of Les Convers, in which marshlands the Suze takes its source is located on its territory.

On 31 December 2009 District de Courtelary, the municipality's former district, was dissolved. On the following day, 1 January 2010, it joined the newly created Arrondissement administratif Jura bernois.

== Coat of arms ==
The blazon of the municipal coat of arms is Argent on a Bar Vert a Mullet Or.

== Demographics ==
Renan has a population (as of December 2020) of 934. As of 2010, 11.6% of the population are resident foreign nationals. Over the last 10 years (2000-2010) the population has changed at a rate of 9.4%. Migration accounted for 12.1%, while births and deaths accounted for -1.2%.

Most of the population (as of 2000) speaks French (590 or 70.6%) as their first language, German is the second most common (216 or 25.8%) and Italian is the third (9 or 1.1%). There is 1 person who speaks Romansh.

As of 2008, the population was 49.5% male and 50.5% female. The population was made up of 370 Swiss men (43.5% of the population) and 51 (6.0%) non-Swiss men. There were 382 Swiss women (44.9%) and 48 (5.6%) non-Swiss women. Of the population in the municipality, 242 or about 28.9% were born in Renan and lived there in 2000. There were 205 or 24.5% who were born in the same canton, while 245 or 29.3% were born somewhere else in Switzerland, and 87 or 10.4% were born outside of Switzerland.

As of 2010, children and teenagers (0–19 years old) make up 22.4% of the population, while adults (20–64 years old) make up 60.5% and seniors (over 64 years old) make up 17%.

As of 2000, there were 358 people who were single and never married in the municipality. There were 374 married individuals, 62 widows or widowers and 42 individuals who are divorced.

As of 2000, there were 107 households that consist of only one person and 24 households with five or more people. In 2000, a total of 318 apartments (74.8% of the total) were permanently occupied, while 65 apartments (15.3%) were seasonally occupied and 42 apartments (9.9%) were empty. As of 2010, the construction rate of new housing units was 1.2 new units per 1000 residents. The vacancy rate for the municipality, in 2011, was 1.94%.

The historical population is given in the following chart:

== Sights ==
The entire village of Renan is designated as part of the Inventory of Swiss Heritage Sites.

== Politics ==
In the 2011 federal election the most popular party was the Swiss People's Party (SVP) which received 30.2% of the vote. The next three most popular parties were the Social Democratic Party (SP) (22.1%), the Green Party (10.8%) and the FDP.The Liberals (10.5%). In the federal election, a total of 225 votes were cast, and the voter turnout was 34.9%.

== Economy ==
As of 2011, Renan had an unemployment rate of 2.31%. As of 2008, there were a total of 245 people employed in the municipality. Of these, there were 80 people employed in the primary economic sector and about 28 businesses involved in this sector. 38 people were employed in the secondary sector and there were 10 businesses in this sector. 127 people were employed in the tertiary sector, with 14 businesses in this sector. There were 11 residents of the municipality who were employed in some capacity, of which females made up 18.2% of the workforce.

In 2008 there were a total of 192 full-time equivalent jobs. The number of jobs in the primary sector was 60, all of which were in agriculture. The number of jobs in the secondary sector was 36 of which 33 or (91.7%) were in manufacturing and 3 (8.3%) were in construction. The number of jobs in the tertiary sector was 96. In the tertiary sector; 5 or 5.2% were in wholesale or retail sales or the repair of motor vehicles, 9 or 9.4% were in a hotel or restaurant, 5 or 5.2% were in education and 69 or 71.9% were in health care.

In 2000, there were 97 workers who commuted into the municipality and 222 workers who commuted away. The municipality is a net exporter of workers, with about 2.3 workers leaving the municipality for every one entering. About 11.3% of the workforce coming into Renan are coming from outside Switzerland. Of the working population, 9.5% used public transportation to get to work, and 60.2% used a private car.

== Religion ==
From the 2000 census, 158 or 18.9% were Roman Catholic, while 423 or 50.6% belonged to the Swiss Reformed Church. Of the rest of the population, there were 6 members of an Orthodox church (or about 0.72% of the population), there were 4 individuals (or about 0.48% of the population) who belonged to the Christian Catholic Church, and there were 126 individuals (or about 15.07% of the population) who belonged to another Christian church. There was 1 individual who was Jewish, and 7 (or about 0.84% of the population) who were Islamic. There was 1 person who was Hindu and 8 individuals who belonged to another church. 104 (or about 12.44% of the population) belonged to no church, are agnostic or atheist, and 58 individuals (or about 6.94% of the population) did not answer the question.

== Education ==
In Renan about 270 or (32.3%) of the population have completed non-mandatory upper secondary education, and 68 or (8.1%) have completed additional higher education (either university or a Fachhochschule). Of the 68 who completed tertiary schooling, 57.4% were Swiss men, 29.4% were Swiss women, 10.3% were non-Swiss men.

The Canton of Bern school system provides one year of non-obligatory Kindergarten, followed by six years of Primary school. This is followed by three years of obligatory lower Secondary school where the students are separated according to ability and aptitude. Following the lower Secondary students may attend additional schooling or they may enter an apprenticeship.

During the 2010-11 school year, there were a total of 65 students attending classes in Renan. There was one kindergarten class with a total of 17 students in the municipality. The municipality had 3 primary classes and 48 students. Of the primary students, 4.2% were permanent or temporary residents of Switzerland (not citizens) and 2.1% have a different mother language than the classroom language.

As of 2000, there were 22 students in Renan who came from another municipality, while 83 residents attended schools outside the municipality.

== Transportation ==
The municipality has a railway station, Renan BE. The station is located on the Biel/Bienne–La Chaux-de-Fonds line and has hourly service to Biel/Bienne and La Chaux-de-Fonds.
