= La Ferrière, Switzerland =

La Ferrière
- Municipality
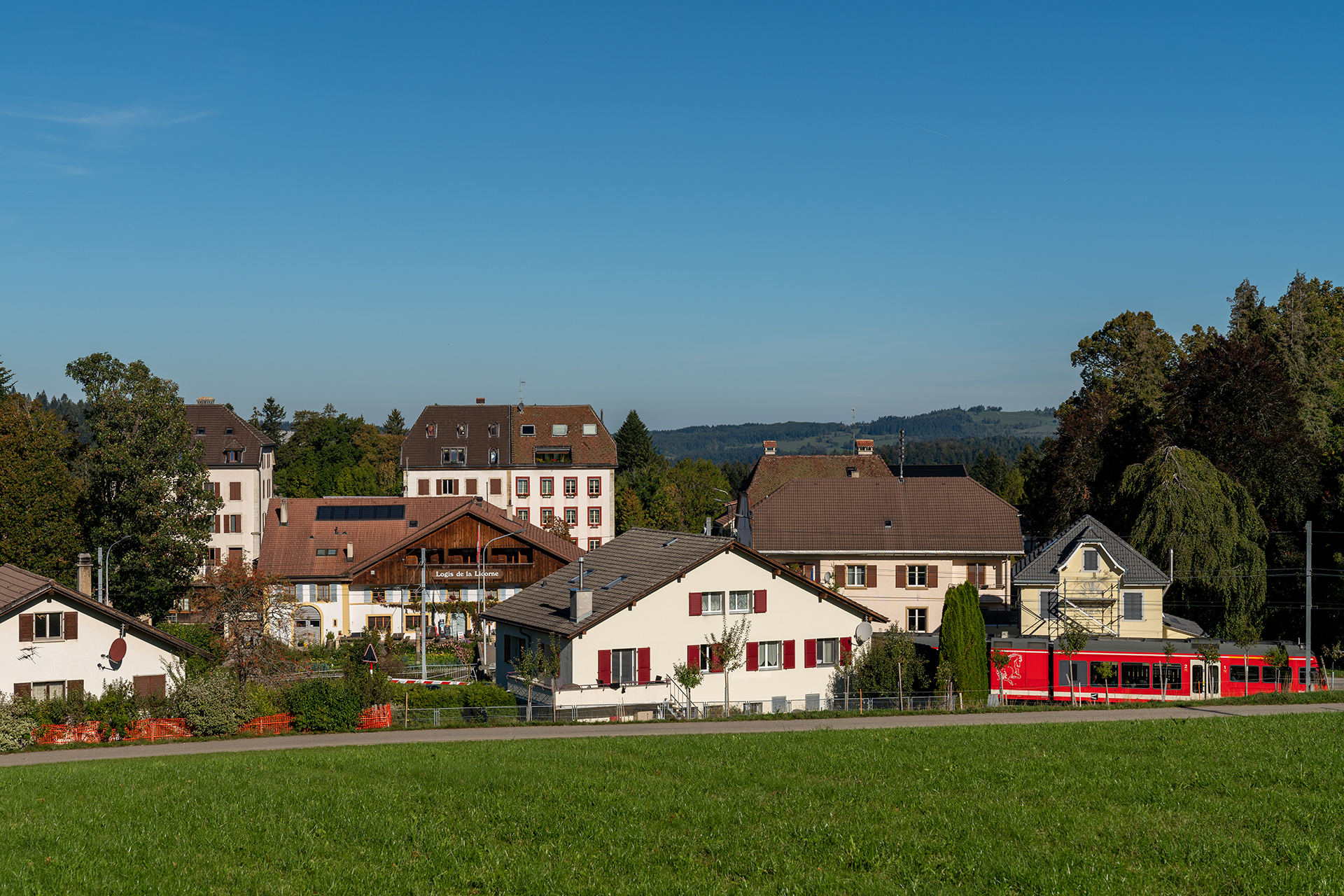

- Flag Coat of arms
- Location of La Ferrière
- Location within Switzerland Location within Canton of Bern
- Coordinates: 47°9′N 6°54′E
- Country: Switzerland
- Canton: Bern
- District: Jura bernois

Government
  - Mayor: Maire; Bernard Tschäppät

Area
  - Total: 14.23 km^{2} (5.49 sq mi)
- Elevation: 1,005 m (3,297 ft)

Population (December 2020)
  - Total: 530
  - Density: 37/km^{2} (96/sq mi)
- Time zone: UTC+01:00 (CET)
  - Summer (DST): UTC+02:00 (CEST)
- Postal code: 2333
- SFOS number: 435
- ISO 3166 code: CH-BE
- Surrounded by: Renan, Sonvilier, Les Bois, La Chaux-de-Fonds
- Website: laferriere.ch

La Ferrière is a municipality in the Jura bernois administrative district in the canton of Bern in Switzerland. It is located in the French-speaking Bernese Jura (Jura Bernois).

== History ==
Aerial view (1955)

Founded in 1590 as les Hautes Montagnes d'Erguël by settlers from Valangin. In 1749 it was known as La Ferriere or Communauté des Montagnes de Saint-Imier.

The village was owned by the Prince-Bishop of Basel and was part of the seigniory of Erguel. The municipal charter was created in the early 17th century and confirmed in 1623 and again in 1672. During the Thirty Years War the village was attacked and burned. Originally there was little land and no forests attached to the village. The lack of arable land and the resulting revenue made it very difficult for the village to meet their obligations. In 1767, the Prince-Bishop granted Erguel Castle and the surrounding lands to La Ferrière to hold as a fief. In 1806, the political municipality of La Ferrière inherited the castle and lands and in 1828 sold them to Sonvilier. After the 1797 French invasion the village became part of the parish of Renan in the French Department of Mont-Terrible. The parish was later transferred to the Department of Haut-Rhin. After Napoleon's defeat in 1815, the region became part of the Canton of Bern, though La Ferrière remained part of the Renan parish until 1861.

The village church was consecrated in 1864.

During the 19th century the population grew rapidly due to watch and watch parts factories that opened in the village. Throughout the 20th century, the population has slowly declined.

== Geography ==
La Ferrière has an area of 14.16 km^{2} (5.47 sq mi). Of this area, 8.82 km^{2} (3.41 mi^{2}) or 62.3% is used for agricultural purposes, while 4.79 km^{2} (1.85 mi^{2}) or 33.8% is forested. Of the rest of the land, 0.52 km^{2} (0.20 mi^{2}) or 3.7% is settled (buildings or roads), 0.03 km^{2} (7.4 acres) or 0.2% is either rivers or lakes and 0.02 km^{2} (4.9 acres) or 0.1% is unproductive land.

Of the built up area, housing and buildings made up 2.1% and transportation infrastructure made up 1.4%. Out of the forested land, 25.4% of the total land area is heavily forested and 8.5% is covered with orchards or small clusters of trees. Of the agricultural land, 1.6% is used for growing crops and 41.6% is pastures and 19.1% is used for alpine pastures. All the water in the municipality is flowing water.

The municipality is made up of scattered settlements at an elevation of about 1,000 meters (3,300 ft) in the north-west corner of the old District de Courtelary. It consists of the village of La Ferrière, the hamlet of La Basse-Ferrière and a number of scattered farm houses.

On 31 December 2009 District de Courtelary, the municipality's former district, was dissolved. On the following day, 1 January 2010, it joined the newly created Arrondissement administratif Jura bernois.

== Coat of arms ==
The blazon of the municipal coat of arms is Azure a Tower Argent gated and windowed Gules between four Linden Leaves and in a Chief wavy Or a Sun issuant Gules.

== Demographics ==
La Ferrière has a population (as of December 2020) of 530. As of 2010, 7.7% of the population are resident foreign nationals. Over the last 10 years (2000-2010) the population has changed at a rate of 6.2%. Migration accounted for 4.3%, while births and deaths accounted for 2.3%.

Most of the population (as of 2000) speaks French (418 or 81.5%) as their first language, German is the second most common (85 or 16.6%) and Italian is the third (5 or 1.0%).

As of 2008, the population was 48.5% male and 51.5% female. The population was made up of 244 Swiss men (44.7% of the population) and 21 (3.8%) non-Swiss men. There were 260 Swiss women (47.6%) and 21 (3.8%) non-Swiss women. Of the population in the municipality, 196 or about 38.2% were born in La Ferrière and lived there in 2000. There were 86 or 16.8% who were born in the same canton, while 180 or 35.1% were born somewhere else in Switzerland, and 45 or 8.8% were born outside of Switzerland.

As of 2010, children and teenagers (0–19 years old) make up 26.9% of the population, while adults (20–64 years old) make up 59.3% and seniors (over 64 years old) make up 13.7%.

As of 2000, there were 224 people who were single and never married in the municipality. There were 258 married individuals, 22 widows or widowers and 9 individuals who are divorced.

As of 2000, there were 36 households that consist of only one person and 24 households with five or more people. In 2000, a total of 172 apartments (73.2% of the total) were permanently occupied, while 47 apartments (20.0%) were seasonally occupied and 16 apartments (6.8%) were empty.

The historical population is given in the following chart:

== Heritage sites of national significance ==
The Maison Gagnebin is listed as a Swiss heritage site of national significance.

== Politics ==
In the 2011 federal election the most popular party was the Swiss People's Party (SVP) which received 41.9% of the vote. The next two most popular parties were the Social Democratic Party (SP) (13.1%), and the Green Party (11.4%). In the federal election, a total of 119 votes were cast, and the voter turnout was 29.9%.

== Economy ==
As of 2011, La Ferrière had an unemployment rate of 2.3%. As of 2008, there were a total of 272 people employed in the municipality. Of these, there were 79 people employed in the primary economic sector and about 31 businesses involved in this sector. 143 people were employed in the secondary sector and there were 10 businesses in this sector. 50 people were employed in the tertiary sector, with 15 businesses in this sector. There were 14 residents of the municipality who were employed in some capacity, of which females made up 28.6% of the workforce.

In 2008 there were a total of 229 full-time equivalent jobs. The number of jobs in the primary sector was 55, all of which were in agriculture. The number of jobs in the secondary sector was 139 of which 37 or (26.6%) were in manufacturing and 102 (73.4%) were in construction. The number of jobs in the tertiary sector was 35. In the tertiary sector; 5 or 14.3% were in wholesale or retail sales or the repair of motor vehicles, 8 or 22.9% were in the movement and storage of goods, 11 or 31.4% were in a hotel or restaurant, 6 or 17.1% were in education.

In 2000, there were 84 workers who commuted into the municipality and 144 workers who commuted away. The municipality is a net exporter of workers, with about 1.7 workers leaving the municipality for every one entering. About 16.7% of the workforce coming into La Ferrière are coming from outside Switzerland. Of the working population, 7.9% used public transportation to get to work, and 55.2% used a private car.

== Transport ==
The municipality has two railway stations on the La Chaux-de-Fonds–Glovelier line: La Ferrière and La Chaux-d'Abel.

== Religion ==
From the 2000 census, 84 or 16.4% were Roman Catholic, while 276 or 53.8% belonged to the Swiss Reformed Church. Of the rest of the population, there was 1 individual who belongs to the Christian Catholic Church, and there were 112 individuals (or about 21.83% of the population) who belonged to another Christian church. There was 1 individual who was Islamic. There were 1 individual who belonged to another church. 86 (or about 16.76% of the population) belonged to no church, are agnostic or atheist, and 8 individuals (or about 1.56% of the population) did not answer the question.

== Education ==
In La Ferrière about 178 or (34.7%) of the population have completed non-mandatory upper secondary education, and 40 or (7.8%) have completed additional higher education (either university or a Fachhochschule). Of the 40 who completed tertiary schooling, 65.0% were Swiss men, 30.0% were Swiss women.

The Canton of Bern school system provides one year of non-obligatory Kindergarten, followed by six years of Primary school. This is followed by three years of obligatory lower Secondary school where the students are separated according to ability and aptitude. Following the lower Secondary students may attend additional schooling or they may enter an apprenticeship.

During the 2010–11 school year, there were a total of 58 students attending classes in La Ferrière. There was one kindergarten class with a total of 11 students in the municipality. The municipality had 2 primary classes and 44 students. Of the primary students, 4.5% were permanent or temporary residents of Switzerland (not citizens) and 13.6% have a different mother language than the classroom language. During the same year, there was one lower secondary class with a total of 3 students.

As of 2000, there were 4 students in La Ferrière who came from another municipality, while 51 residents attended schools outside the municipality.
