= Les Bois railway station =

Railway station in Les Bois, Switzerland

Les Bois
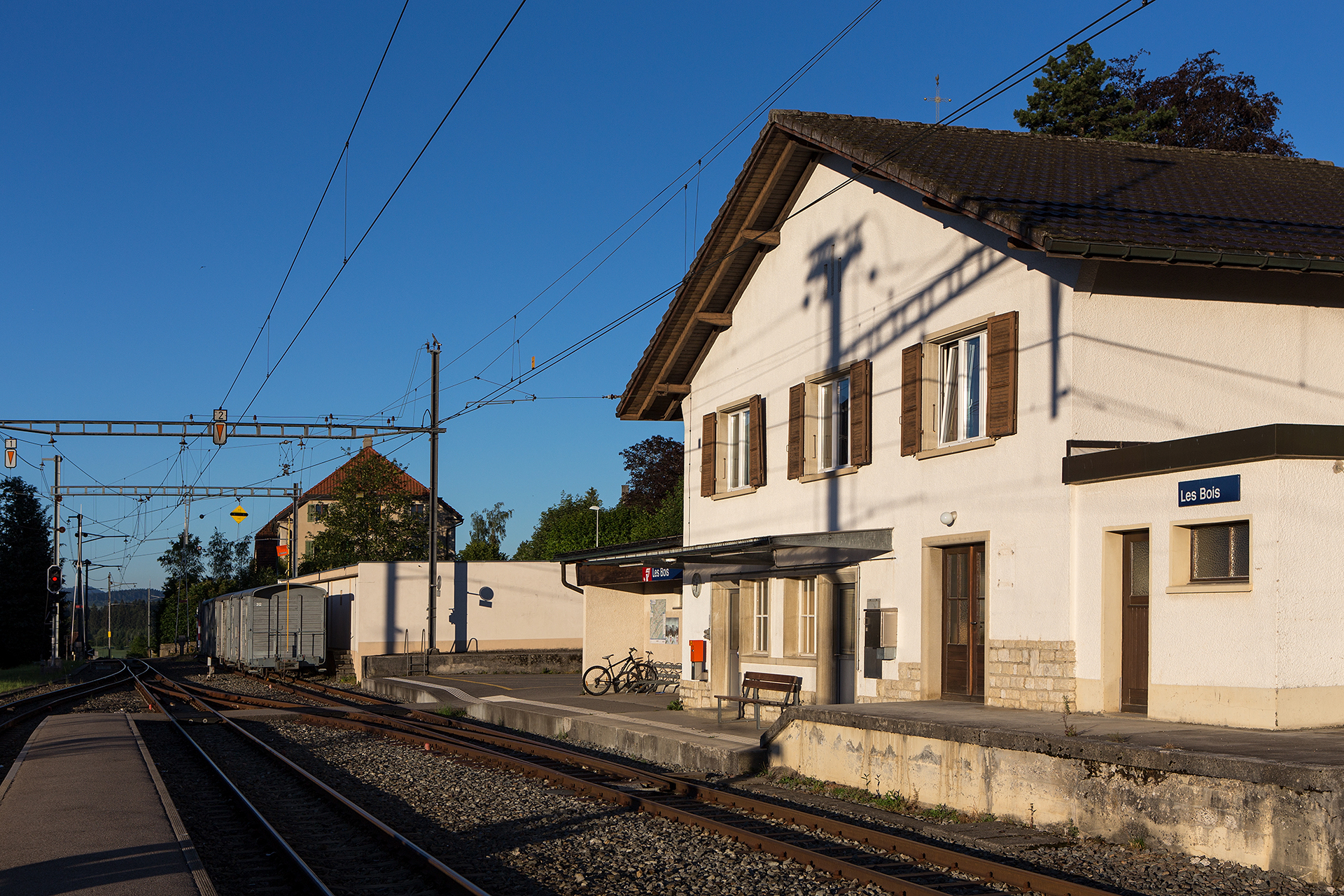
- The station in 2016

General information
- Location: Les Bois, Jura; Switzerland
- Coordinates: 47°10′37″N 6°54′22″E
- Elevation: 1,028 m (3,373 ft)
- Owner: Chemins de fer du Jura
- Line: La Chaux-de-Fonds–Glovelier line
- Distance: 30.2 km (18.8 mi) from Tavannes
- Platforms: 2 (1 island platform)
- Tracks: 2
- Train operators: Chemins de fer du Jura

Construction
- Accessible: No

Other information
- Station code: 8500177 (BOIS)
- Fare zone: 42 (Onde Verte and Vagabond)

Services
Preceding station	Chemins de fer du Jura	Following station
La Large-Journée towards La Chaux-de-Fonds	R36	Le Boéchet towards Glovelier
Location
- Location within Switzerland Location within Canton of Jura

Les Bois railway station (French: Gare des Bois) is a railway station in the municipality of Les Bois, in the Swiss canton of Jura. It is an intermediate stop and a request stop on the 1,000 mm (3 ft 3 3/8 in) metre gauge La Chaux-de-Fonds–Glovelier line of the Chemins de fer du Jura.

== Services ==
As of the December 2023 timetable change, the following services stop at Les Bois:

- Regio: hourly service between La Chaux-de-Fonds and Glovelier.
