= Le Boéchet railway station =

Railway station in Les Bois, Switzerland

Le Boéchet
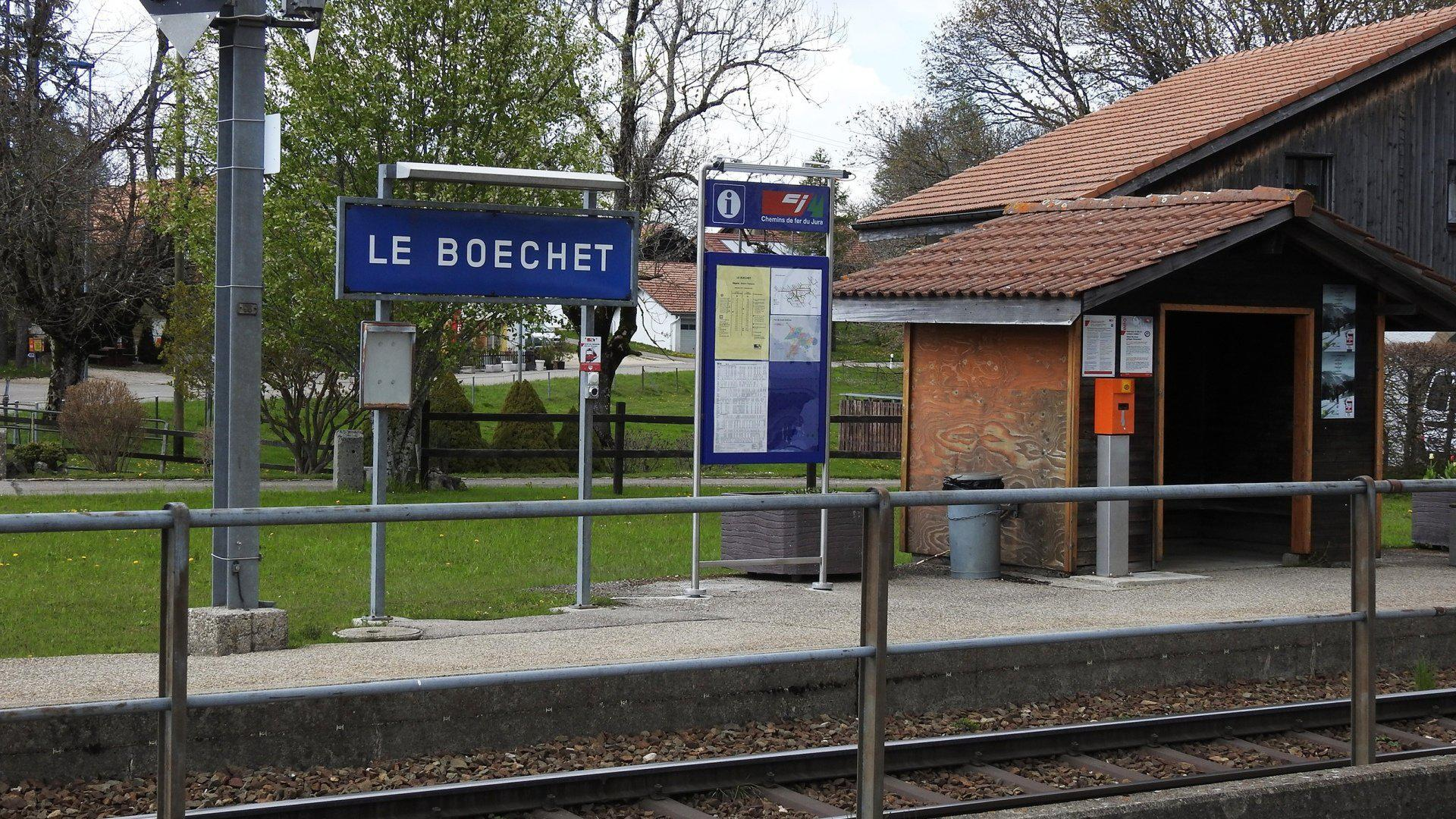
- The station platform in 2019

General information
- Location: Les Bois, Jura; Switzerland
- Coordinates: 47°11′38″N 6°55′19″E
- Elevation: 1,033 m (3,389 ft)
- Owner: Chemins de fer du Jura
- Line: La Chaux-de-Fonds–Glovelier line
- Distance: 27.8 km (17.3 mi) from Tavannes
- Platforms: 1 side platform
- Tracks: 1
- Train operators: Chemins de fer du Jura

Construction
- Accessible: No

Other information
- Station code: 8500176 (BOEC)
- Fare zone: 42 (Onde Verte and Vagabond)

Services
Preceding station	Chemins de fer du Jura	Following station
Les Bois towards La Chaux-de-Fonds	R36	Le Creux-des-Biches towards Glovelier
Location
- Location within Switzerland Location within Canton of Jura

Le Boéchet railway station (French: Gare du Boéchet) is a railway station in the municipality of Les Bois, in the Swiss canton of Jura. It is an intermediate stop and a request stop on the 1,000 mm (3 ft 3 3/8 in) metre gauge La Chaux-de-Fonds–Glovelier line of the Chemins de fer du Jura.

== Services ==
As of the December 2023 timetable change, the following services stop at Le Boéchet:

- Regio: hourly service between La Chaux-de-Fonds and Glovelier.
