= Les Bois =

- Municipality
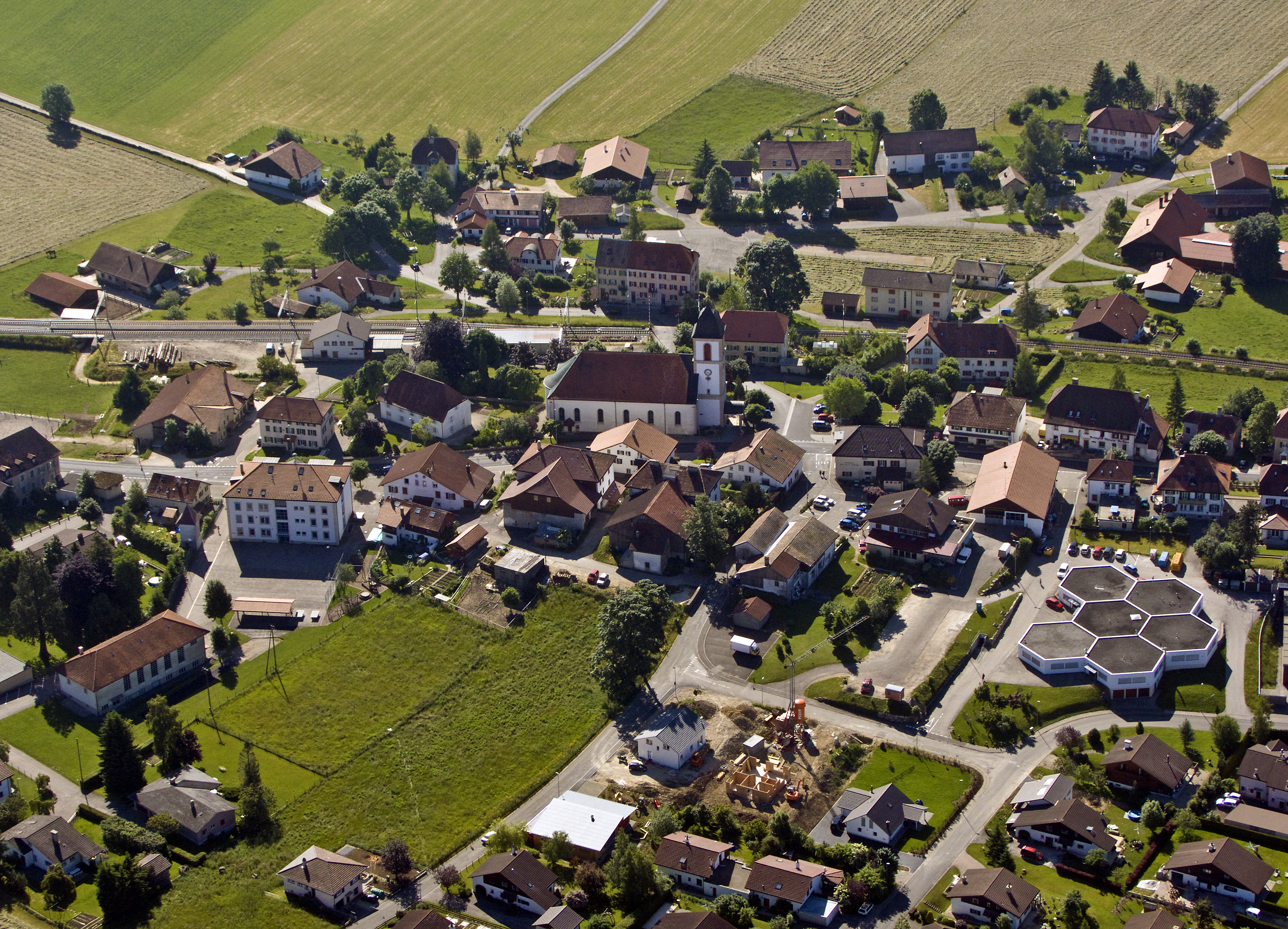

- Flag Coat of arms
- Location of Les Bois
- Location within Switzerland Location within Canton of Jura
- Coordinates: 47°11′N 06°54′E
- Country: Switzerland
- Canton: Jura
- District: Franches-Montagnes

Government
  - Executive: Conseil communal with 7 members
  - Mayor: Maire; Gabriel Bilat Ind. (as of 2026)
  - Parliament: Conseil général with 26 members

Area
  - Total: 24.7 km^{2} (9.5 sq mi)
- Elevation: 1,034 m (3,392 ft)
- Highest elevation: 1,119 m (3,671 ft)
- Lowest elevation (Doubs): 607 m (1,991 ft)

Population (2020)
  - Total: 1,246
  - Density: 50.4/km^{2} (131/sq mi)
- Time zone: UTC+01:00 (CET)
  - Summer (DST): UTC+02:00 (CEST)
- Postal code: 2336
- SFOS number: 6742
- ISO 3166 code: CH-JU
- Surrounded by: Le Noirmont, Saint-Imier (BE), Sonvilier (BE), La Ferrière (BE), La Chaux-de-Fonds (NE), Fournet-Blancheroche (F), Charquemont (F)
- Website: lesbois.ch

Les Bois (French pronunciation: [le bwa]; Frainc-Comtou: Lés Bôs) is a municipality in the district of Franches-Montagnes in the canton of Jura in Switzerland.

== History ==
Les Bois is first mentioned in 1484 as Des Boix.

== Geography ==
Aerial view (1958)

Les Bois has an area of 24.71 km^{2} (9.54 sq mi). Of this area, 14 km^{2} (5.4 mi^{2}) or 56.6% is used for agricultural purposes, while 9.27 km^{2} (3.58 mi^{2}) or 37.5% is forested. Of the rest of the land, 1.36 km^{2} (0.53 mi^{2}) or 5.5% is settled (buildings or roads), 0.11 km^{2} (27 acres) or 0.4% is either rivers or lakes. Of the built up area, housing and buildings made up 1.9% and transportation infrastructure made up 1.5%. while parks, green belts and sports fields made up 1.8%. Out of the forested land, 31.4% of the total land area is heavily forested and 6.0% is covered with orchards or small clusters of trees. Of the agricultural land, 32.6% is pastures and 23.5% is used for alpine pastures. All the water in the municipality is in lakes.

The municipality is located in the Franches-Montagnes district. It is the largest municipality in the canton. It consists of the village of Les Bois and nine hamlets.

The municipalities of Le Bémont, Les Bois, Les Breuleux, La Chaux-des-Breuleux, Les Enfers, Les Genevez, Lajoux, Montfaucon, Muriaux, Le Noirmont, Saignelégier, Saint-Brais and Soubey are considering a merger on at a date in the future into the new municipality of Franches-Montagnes.

== Coat of arms ==
The blazon of the municipal coat of arms is Argent, three Pine trees Vert trunked and radicated Sable issaunt from Coupeaux Gules. The three trees are an example of canting since Les Bois means the woods.

== Demographics ==
Les Bois has a population (as of December 2020) of 1,246. As of 2008, 9.7% of the population are resident foreign nationals. Over the last 10 years (2000–2010) the population has changed at a rate of 14.7%. Migration accounted for 12.2%, while births and deaths accounted for 3%.

Most of the population (as of 2000) speaks French (958 or 93.1%) as their first language, German is the second most common (46 or 4.5%) and Italian is the third (6 or 0.6%).

As of 2008, the population was 50.2% male and 49.8% female. The population was made up of 519 Swiss men (44.9% of the population) and 61 (5.3%) non-Swiss men. There were 524 Swiss women (45.4%) and 51 (4.4%) non-Swiss women. Of the population in the municipality, 466 or about 45.3% were born in Les Bois and lived there in 2000. There were 128 or 12.4% who were born in the same canton, while 287 or 27.9% were born somewhere else in Switzerland, and 109 or 10.6% were born outside of Switzerland.

As of 2000, children and teenagers (0–19 years old) make up 29.6% of the population, while adults (20–64 years old) make up 54.2% and seniors (over 64 years old) make up 16.1%.

As of 2000, there were 468 people who were single and never married in the municipality. There were 474 married individuals, 48 widows or widowers and 39 individuals who are divorced.

As of 2000, there were 373 private households in the municipality, and an average of 2.6 persons per household. There were 97 households that consist of only one person and 48 households with five or more people. In 2000, a total of 364 apartments (79.0% of the total) were permanently occupied, while 65 apartments (14.1%) were seasonally occupied and 32 apartments (6.9%) were empty. As of 2009, the construction rate of new housing units was 2.6 new units per 1000 residents. The vacancy rate for the municipality, in 2010, was 1.16%.

The historical population is given in the following chart:

== Politics ==
In the 2007 federal election the most popular party was the SPS which received 36.67% of the vote. The next three most popular parties were the CSP (22.96%), the CVP (16.64%) and the SVP (13.1%). In the federal election, a total of 327 votes were cast, and the voter turnout was 40.8%.

== Economy ==
As of 2010, Les Bois had an unemployment rate of 4.8%. As of 2008, there were 128 people employed in the primary economic sector and about 47 businesses involved in this sector. 246 people were employed in the secondary sector and there were 17 businesses in this sector. 116 people were employed in the tertiary sector, with 30 businesses in this sector. There were 497 residents of the municipality who were employed in some capacity, of which females made up 43.5% of the workforce.

In 2008 the total number of full-time equivalent jobs was 421. The number of jobs in the primary sector was 86, of which 81 were in agriculture and 5 were in forestry or lumber production. The number of jobs in the secondary sector was 242 of which 222 or (91.7%) were in manufacturing and 19 (7.9%) were in construction. The number of jobs in the tertiary sector was 93. In the tertiary sector; 28 or 30.1% were in wholesale or retail sales or the repair of motor vehicles, 8 or 8.6% were in the movement and storage of goods, 24 or 25.8% were in a hotel or restaurant, 3 or 3.2% were in the information industry, 1 was the insurance or financial industry, 8 or 8.6% were technical professionals or scientists, 8 or 8.6% were in education and 3 or 3.2% were in health care.

In 2000, there were 198 workers who commuted into the municipality and 281 workers who commuted away. The municipality is a net exporter of workers, with about 1.4 workers leaving the municipality for every one entering. About 32.8% of the workforce coming into Les Bois are coming from outside Switzerland. Of the working population, 8% used public transportation to get to work, and 60% used a private car.

== Transport ==
The municipality has three railway stations on the La Chaux-de-Fonds–Glovelier line: Les Bois, Le Boéchet, and La Large-Journée.

== Religion ==
From the 2000 census, 668 or 64.9% were Roman Catholic, while 177 or 17.2% belonged to the Swiss Reformed Church. Of the rest of the population, there were 2 members of an Orthodox church (or about 0.19% of the population), and there were 42 individuals (or about 4.08% of the population) who belonged to another Christian church. There were 13 (or about 1.26% of the population) who were Islamic. 106 (or about 10.30% of the population) belonged to no church, are agnostic or atheist, and 40 individuals (or about 3.89% of the population) did not answer the question.

== Education ==
In Les Bois about 319 or (31.0%) of the population have completed non-mandatory upper secondary education, and 80 or (7.8%) have completed additional higher education (either university or a Fachhochschule). Of the 80 who completed tertiary schooling, 55.0% were Swiss men, 31.3% were Swiss women, 7.5% were non-Swiss men and 6.3% were non-Swiss women.

The Canton of Jura school system provides two year of non-obligatory Kindergarten, followed by six years of Primary school. This is followed by three years of obligatory lower Secondary school where the students are separated according to ability and aptitude. Following the lower Secondary students may attend a three or four year optional upper Secondary school followed by some form of Tertiary school or they may enter an apprenticeship.

During the 2009–10 school year, there were a total of 118 students attending 7 classes in Les Bois. There was one kindergarten class with a total of 21 students in the municipality. The municipality had 6 primary classes and 97 students. There are only nine Secondary schools in the canton, so all the students from Les Bois attend their secondary school in another municipality.

As of 2000, there were 3 students in Les Bois who came from another municipality, while 93 residents attended schools outside the municipality.
