= Taubenloch =

Gorge located in the Canton of Bern

Coordinates: 47.157778°N 7.264722°E

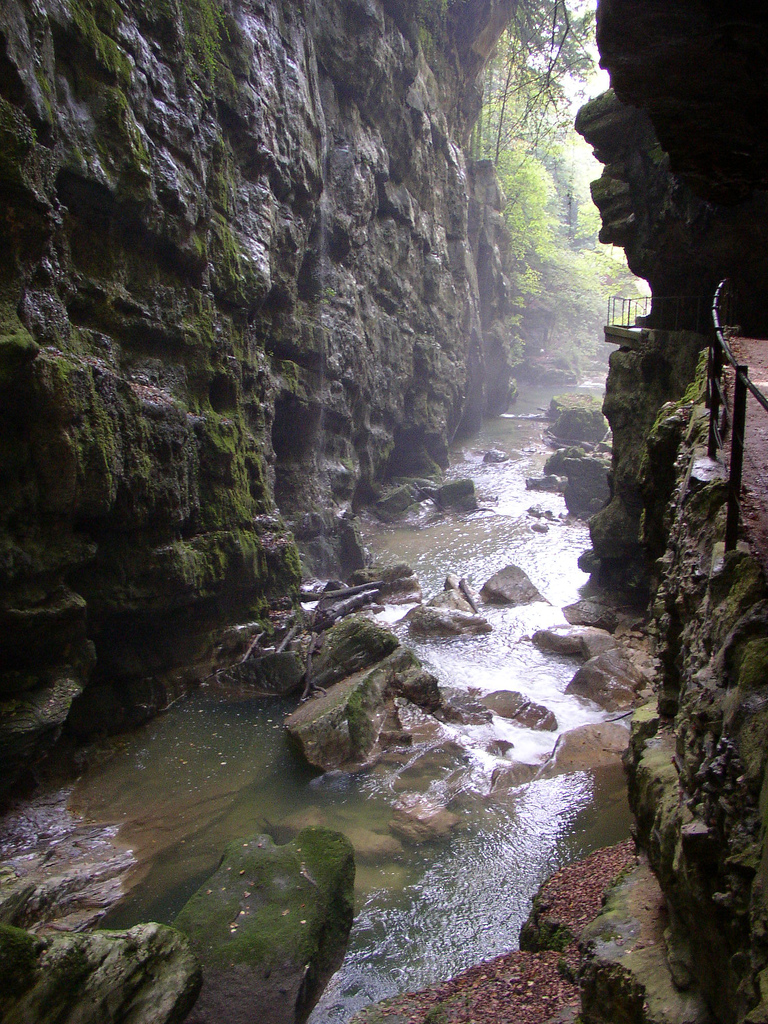
Taubenloch

Taubenloch (French: Gorges du Taubenloch) is a gorge in the Canton of Bern, above Biel/Bienne in Switzerland. It crosses the first Jura Mountain chain, as considered from the Swiss Plateau.

== Location ==
The gorge covers a length of around 2 kilometres between Frinvillier (altitude: 517 m) and Bözingen, a suburb of Biel/Bienne (altitude 447 m). The Suze flows deep in the gorge, originating in the Erguel valley near Saint-Imier and finally flowing to the Lake of Bienne.

== History ==
The gorge is one of the rare natural crossings from the Swiss Plateau to the Jura mountains between Schaffhausen and Geneva.

The area was already well colonised at the time of the Roman Empire: one of the main Roman roads from Rome led through Helvetii to Aventicum (Avenches). It continued through Morat, Chiètres and Kallnach to Solodorum (Solothurn) and Vindonissa (Windisch), along the eastern part of the Seeland (lake land). Via Witzwil, a second road crossed the Seeland between the Lake of Neuchâtel and the lake of Morat. A spur road from Petinesca went through the steep gorge of Taubenloch, crossed the Jura through the Col de Pierre Pertuis pass, and lead to Augusta Raurica and what is now modern Germany along the Rhine.

== Origin of the name ==
The name Taubenloch was found for the first time in a document dated 1532. Several versions as to its provenience are still being debated.

- Daubenloch, from the German words Daube, meaning precipice or trench, and Loch, meaning hole or cavity.
- Die Taube: according to local legend, a young man loved a young girl who was so beautiful, charming and gracious that her nickname was die Taube / fr. la Colombe (the dove). They wanted to get married, but she was chased away by the despotic Sire of nearby Rondchâtel and found a sorry escape from his clutches in throwing herself to death down the gorge. The gorge was henceforth called the Taubenlochschlucht (The Gorge of the Dove) in her memory.
- Similar, but less romantic: (Taube), also meaning pigeon, in reference to birds which allegedly nested in the gorge.

== Hiking ==
A private non-profit corporation was founded in 1889, La société d’exploitation des gorges du Taubenloch, for the only purpose of establishing a hiking path throughout the gorge. Since 1927, part of the Taubenlochschlucht is one of the protected natural sites in Switzerland.

=== Transjurane T16 ===
Traffic runs through either side of Taubenloch, route 18 (south) and route 6 (north). The "Transjurane" motorway project is expected to be finalised between 2025 and 2030, by following the route of the gorge and linking up what is now the E27.

== Sources and references ==
- Tourisme Bienne-Seeland: Excursion gorges du Taubenloch
- Tourisme Suisse: Les Gorges du Taubenloch - des Gorges vertigineuses aux portes de la ville (de Bienne)
- BE Division forrestière agenda de sécurisation / route romaine
- Nouvel éboulement: fermeture 01.08.2009
- La légende de la petite colombe
