= Sonvilier =

- Municipality
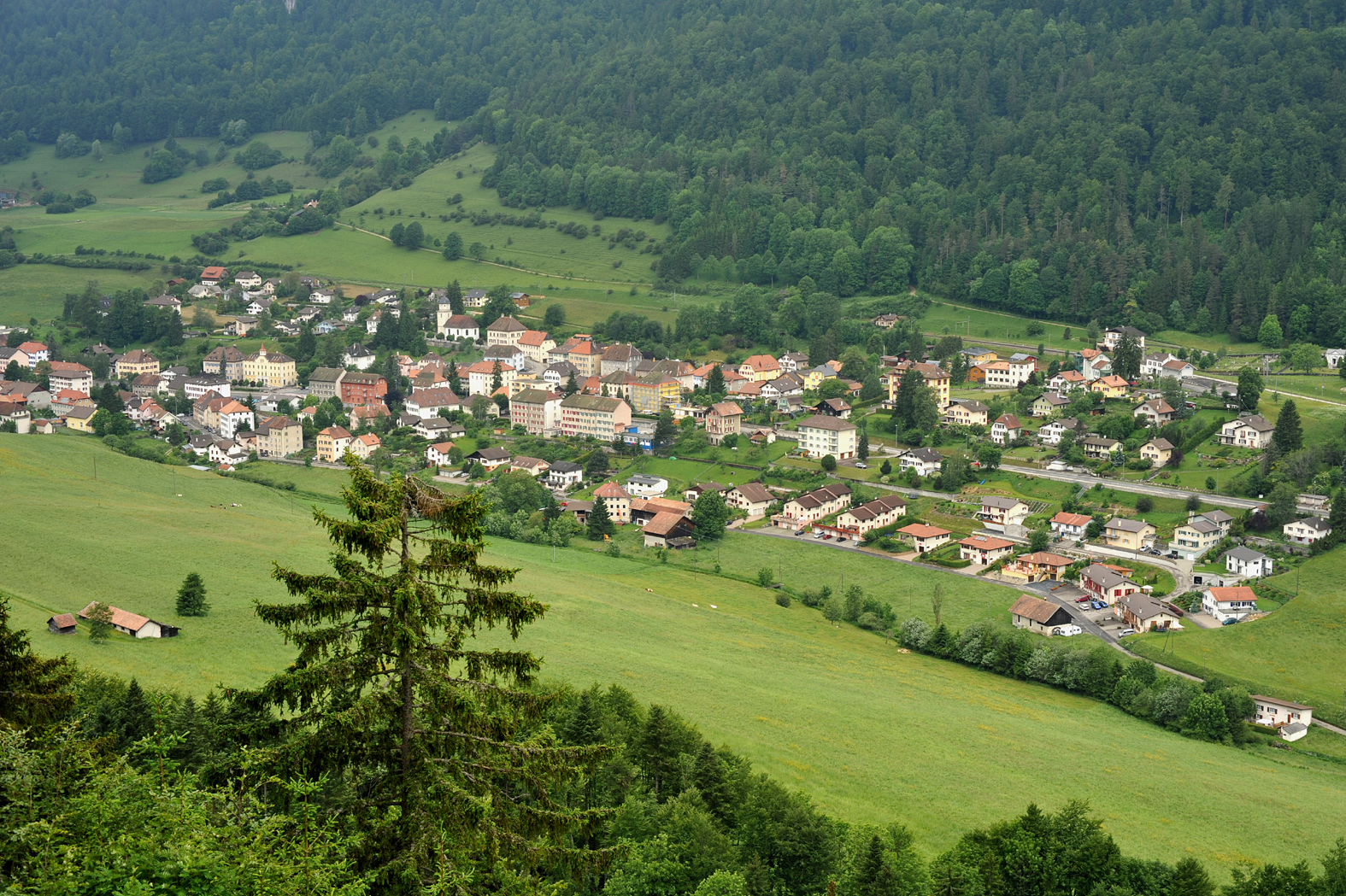
- Sonvilier village from the ruins of Erguel Castle

- Flag Coat of arms
- Location of Sonvilier
- Location within Switzerland Location within Canton of Bern
- Coordinates: 47°8′N 6°58′E
- Country: Switzerland
- Canton: Bern
- District: Jura bernois

Government
  - Executive: Conseil municipal with 7 members
  - Mayor: Maire; Rosemarie Jeanneret (as of 2026)

Area
  - Total: 23.78 km^{2} (9.18 sq mi)
- Elevation: 802 m (2,631 ft)

Population (December 2020)
  - Total: 1,223
  - Density: 51.43/km^{2} (133.2/sq mi)
- Time zone: UTC+01:00 (CET)
  - Summer (DST): UTC+02:00 (CEST)
- Postal code: 2615
- SFOS number: 445
- ISO 3166 code: CH-BE
- Surrounded by: Renan, Saint-Imier, Les Bois, Le Pâquier, Dombresson, Chézard-Saint-Martin
- Website: www.sonvilier.ch

Sonvilier (Frainc-Comtou: Sonvlie) is a municipality in the Jura bernois administrative district in the canton of Bern in Switzerland. It is located in the French-speaking Bernese Jura (Jura Bernois).

== History ==
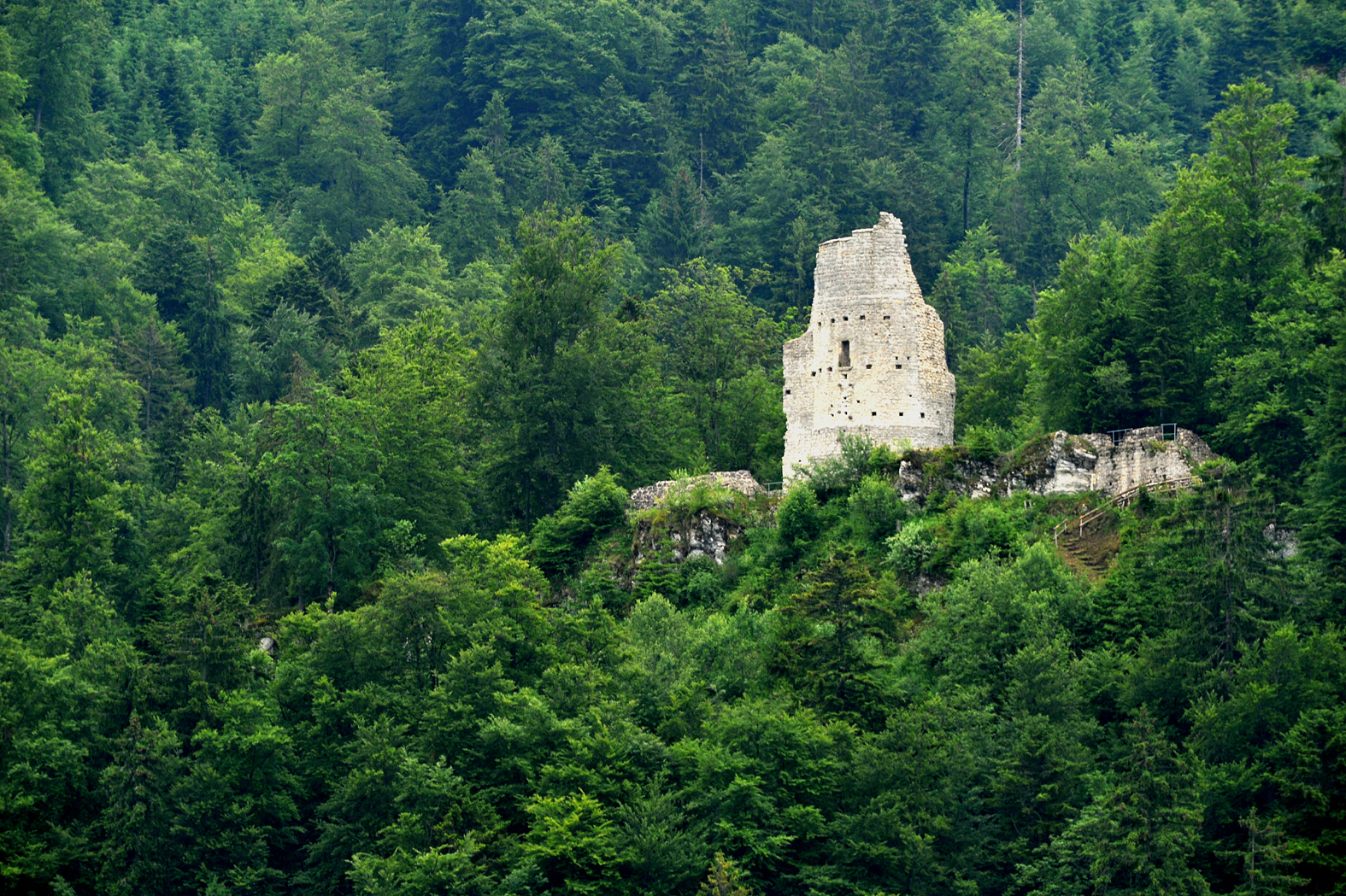
Ruins of Erguel Castle

Aerial view (1950)

Sonvilier is first mentioned in 1298 as Sunuilier. In 1307 it was mentioned as Sonvelier.

Erguel Castle, now in ruins, was built south-east of the village in the 11th century. The castle was the center of government for the lands that the Lords of Arguel (or Erguel) ruled. In 1264 Otto von Erguel, who at the time lived in Basel, ceded the lands to the Prince-Bishop of Basel. In return the bishop granted him lands in Alsace. Under the Prince-Bishop the Erguel lands, including Sonvilier, became part of the seigniory of Erguel. During the 13th and 14th century a local noble family was mentioned in Sonvilier. During the 16th century the municipality was the largest in the Erguel and was home to a half dozen mills that were held in fief to the Prince-Bishop of Basel.

After the 1797 French victory and the Treaty of Campo Formio, Sonvilier became part of the French Département of Mont-Terrible. Three years later, in 1800 it became part of the Département of Haut-Rhin. After Napoleon's defeat and the Congress of Vienna, Sonvilier was assigned to the Canton of Bern in 1815.

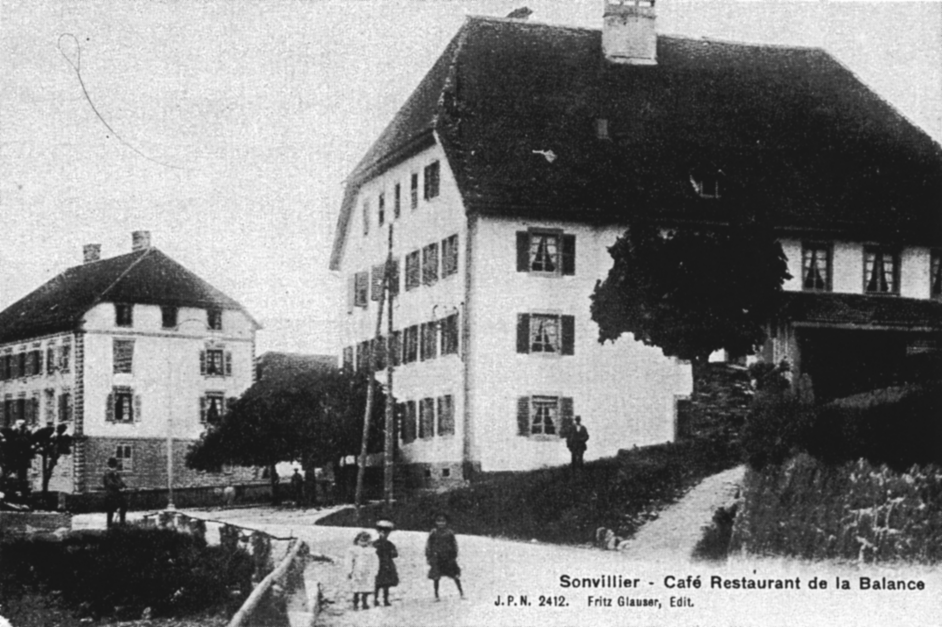
Hôtel de la Balance in Sonvilier, a section of the Jura Federation was founded here on 12 November 1871

Two social movements of the 19th century originated in Sonvilier. In 1843 Fritz Marchand founded the philanthropist L'Union Society. Nearly three decades later, in 1871, a chapter of the Fédération jurassienne (Jura Federation), a federalist and anarchist section of the International Workingmen's Association, was formed in the village. The Jura Federation leader, Mikhail Bakunin, held three conferences in the village during 1871. The Sonviler circular was one of the defining texts of the conflicts within the First International between the Marxists and anarchists ; leading to the Saint-Imier Congress in the neighbouring town, usually considered the birth act of this political movement.

The Bulletin de la Fédération jurassienne, one of the first anarchist periodicals, was published in the town before moving to Le Locle.

Religiously it was part of the parish of Saint-Imier. A Reformed parish church was built in the village in 1832. A Mennonite chapel was built in La Chaux-d'Abel in 1905.

During the 18th and 19th centuries the local economy grew with small scale home work watchmaking and lace making. A number of small workshops provided watch parts for final assembly in other towns in the region. The financial crises of the 1930s and 1970s hit the watch making industry hard and many workshops went out of business. In 2005, only 9% of the jobs in the municipality are in manufacturing, while almost half are in agriculture.

In 1874 the completion of the Biel-Les Convers railway connected Sonvilier into the national rail network. In 1895, the canton acquired the Le Pré aux Boeuf farm and converted it into a boys boarding school. In 1931 they converted the school into a home for people in need.

== Geography ==
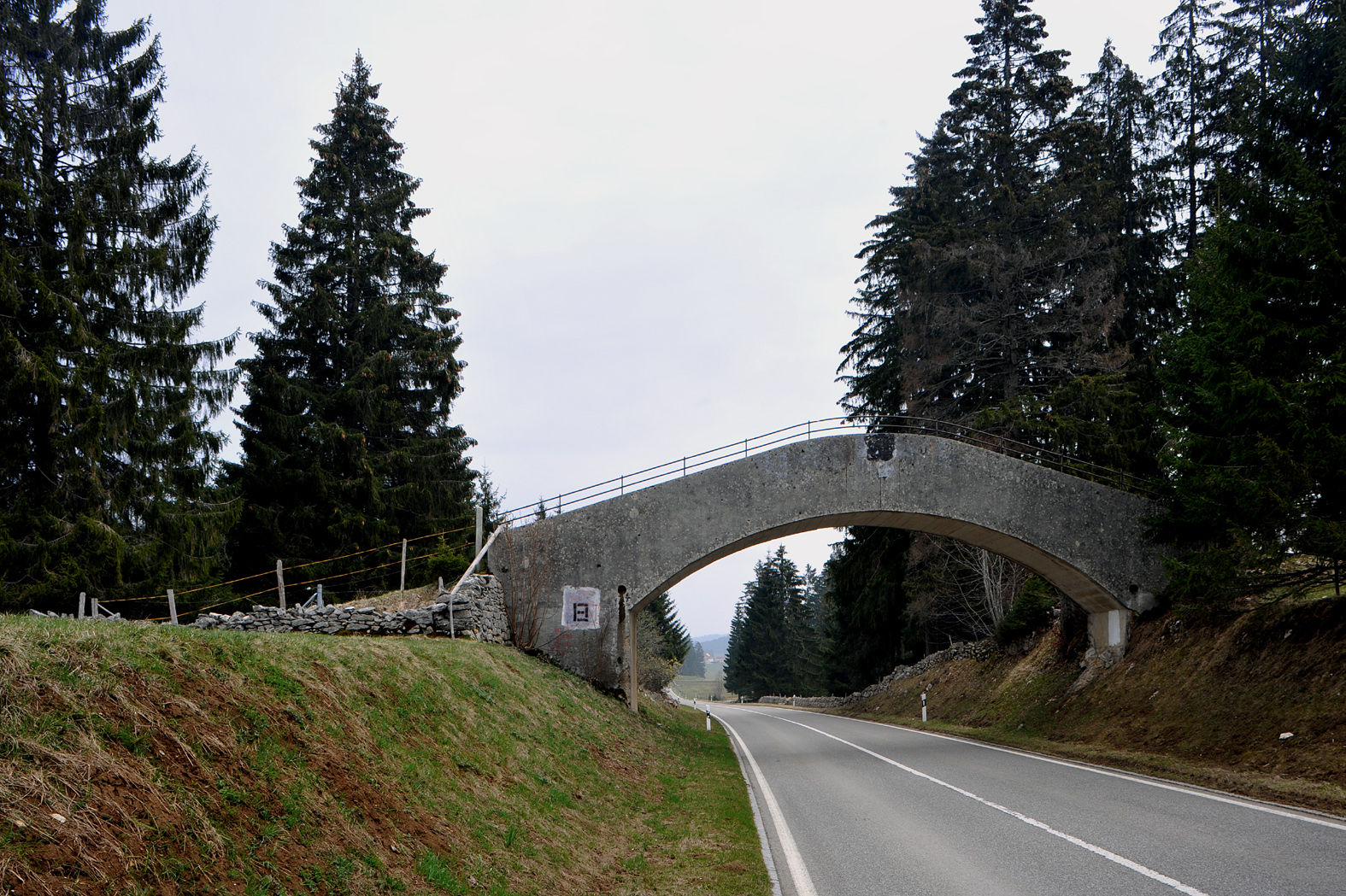
Cattle bridge over a local road in La Chaux-d'Abel

Sonvilier has an area of 23.78 km^{2} (9.18 sq mi). Of this area, 14.46 km^{2} (5.58 mi^{2}) or 60.8% is used for agricultural purposes, while 8.17 km^{2} (3.15 mi^{2}) or 34.4% is forested. Of the rest of the land, 1.06 km^{2} (0.41 mi^{2}) or 4.5% is settled (buildings or roads), 0.03 km^{2} (7.4 acres) or 0.1% is either rivers or lakes and 0.05 km^{2} (12 acres) or 0.2% is unproductive land.

Of the built up area, housing and buildings made up 2.4% and transport infrastructure made up 1.9%. Of the forested land, 28.1% of the total land area is heavily forested and 6.2% is covered with orchards or small clusters of trees. Of the agricultural land, 3.1% is used for growing crops and 34.5% is pastures and 23.1% is used for alpine pastures. All the water in the municipality is flowing water.

The municipality is located above the Suze river valley in the Bernese Jura. It consists of the haufendorf village (an irregular, unplanned and quite closely packed village, built around a central square) of Sonvilier, the hamlet of La Chaux-d'Abel as well as scattered farm houses on the slopes of the Montagne du Droit and the Montagne de l'Envers.

On 31 December 2009 District de Courtelary, the municipality's former district, was dissolved. On the following day, 1 January 2010, it joined the newly created Arrondissement administratif Jura bernois.

== Coat of arms ==
The blazon of the municipal coat of arms is Gules a Banderole Argent in bend.

== Demographics ==
Sonvilier has a population (as of December 2020) of 1,223. As of 2010, 9.8% of the population are resident foreign nationals. Over the last 10 years (2000-2010) the population has changed at a rate of 9.7%. Migration accounted for 4.7%, while births and deaths accounted for 6.2%.

Most of the population (as of 2000) speaks French (889 or 76.8%) as their first language, German is the second most common (205 or 17.7%) and Italian is the third (22 or 1.9%). There is 1 person who speaks Romansh.

As of 2008, the population was 51.9% male and 48.1% female. The population was made up of 540 Swiss men (45.8% of the population) and 72 (6.1%) non-Swiss men. There were 524 Swiss women (44.4%) and 44 (3.7%) non-Swiss women. Of the population in the municipality, 365 or about 31.5% were born in Sonvilier and lived there in 2000. There were 299 or 25.8% who were born in the same canton, while 309 or 26.7% were born somewhere else in Switzerland, and 135 or 11.7% were born outside of Switzerland.

As of 2010, children and teenagers (0–19 years old) make up 25.5% of the population, while adults (20–64 years old) make up 57.3% and seniors (over 64 years old) make up 17.2%.

As of 2000, there were 469 people who were single and never married in the municipality. There were 538 married individuals, 71 widows or widowers and 80 individuals who are divorced.

As of 2000, there were 161 households that consist of only one person and 31 households with five or more people. In 2000, a total of 449 apartments (74.2% of the total) were permanently occupied, while 85 apartments (14.0%) were seasonally occupied and 71 apartments (11.7%) were empty. The vacancy rate for the municipality, in 2011, was 1.65%.

The historical population is given in the following chart:

== Heritage sites of national significance ==
The Ferme De La Grande Coronelle (Grande Coronelle Farm) is listed as a Swiss heritage site of national significance.

== Politics ==
In the 2011 federal election the most popular party was the Swiss People's Party (SVP) which received 30% of the vote. The next three most popular parties were the Social Democratic Party (SP) (20.7%), the Green Party (12%) and the Conservative Democratic Party (BDP) (8%). In the federal election, a total of 249 votes were cast, and the voter turnout was 30.3%.

== Economy ==
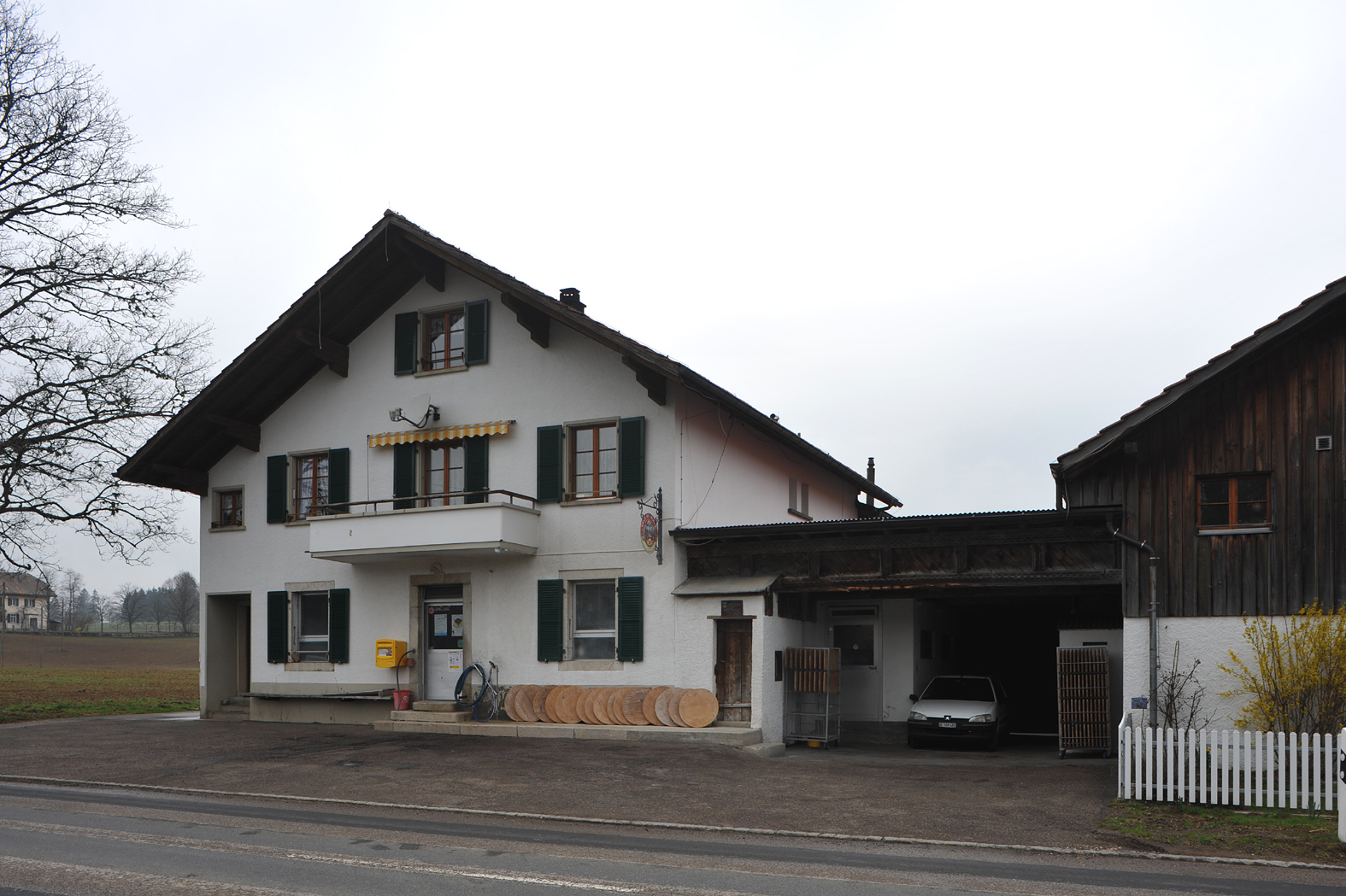
Chaux-d'Abel cheese dairy

As of 2011, Sonvilier had an unemployment rate of 2.57%. As of 2008, there were a total of 269 people employed in the municipality. Of these, there were 119 people employed in the primary economic sector and about 45 businesses involved in this sector. 24 people were employed in the secondary sector and there were 8 businesses in this sector. 126 people were employed in the tertiary sector, with 26 businesses in this sector. There were 536 residents of the municipality who were employed in some capacity, of which females made up 44.0% of the workforce.

In 2008 there were a total of 204 full-time equivalent jobs. The number of jobs in the primary sector was 85, all of which were in agriculture. The number of jobs in the secondary sector was 22 of which 5 or (22.7%) were in manufacturing and 17 (77.3%) were in construction. The number of jobs in the tertiary sector was 97. In the tertiary sector; 16 or 16.5% were in wholesale or retail sales or the repair of motor vehicles, 7 or 7.2% were in a hotel or restaurant, 9 or 9.3% were technical professionals or scientists, 8 or 8.2% were in education and 41 or 42.3% were in health care.

In 2000, there were 78 workers who commuted into the municipality and 346 workers who commuted away. The municipality is a net exporter of workers, with about 4.4 workers leaving the municipality for every one entering. About 5.1% of the workforce coming into Sonvilier are coming from outside Switzerland. Of the working population, 10.3% used public transport to get to work, and 61% used a private car.

== Religion ==
From the 2000 census, 247 or 21.3% were Roman Catholic, while 627 or 54.1% belonged to the Swiss Reformed Church. Of the rest of the population, there were 2 members of an Orthodox church (or about 0.17% of the population), there was 1 individual who belongs to the Christian Catholic Church, and there were 178 individuals (or about 15.37% of the population) who belonged to another Christian church. There were 4 individuals (or about 0.35% of the population) who were Jewish, and 17 (or about 1.47% of the population) who were Islamic. There were 2 individuals who were Buddhist. 129 (or about 11.14% of the population) belonged to no church, are agnostic or atheist, and 40 individuals (or about 3.45% of the population) did not answer the question.

== Education ==
In Sonvilier about 406 or (35.1%) of the population have completed non-mandatory upper secondary education, and 91 or (7.9%) have completed additional higher education (either university or a Fachhochschule). Of the 91 who completed tertiary schooling, 65.9% were Swiss men, 24.2% were Swiss women, 8.8% were non-Swiss men.

The Canton of Bern school system provides one year of non-obligatory Kindergarten, followed by six years of Primary school. This is followed by three years of obligatory lower Secondary school where the students are separated according to ability and aptitude. Following the lower Secondary students may attend additional schooling or they may enter an apprenticeship.

During the 2010-11 school year, there were a total of 110 students attending classes in Sonvilier. There were 2 kindergarten classes with a total of 27 students in the municipality. Of the kindergarten students, 7.4% were permanent or temporary residents of Switzerland (not citizens) and 14.8% have a different mother language than the classroom language. The municipality had 4 primary classes and 83 students. Of the primary students, 1.2% were permanent or temporary residents of Switzerland (not citizens) and 31.3% have a different mother language than the classroom language. As of 2000, there were 34 students in Sonvilier who came from another municipality, while 110 residents attended schools outside the municipality.

Sonvilier is home to the Bibliothèque communale et scolaire de Sonvilier library. The library has (as of 2008) 11,422 books or other media, and loaned out 12,898 items in the same year. It was open a total of 90 days with average of 4 hours per week during that year.

== Transport ==
The municipality has a railway station, Sonvilier. The station is located on the Biel/Bienne–La Chaux-de-Fonds line and has hourly service to Biel/Bienne and La Chaux-de-Fonds.

== Personalities ==
- Louis-Ulysse Chopard, watchmaker and manufacturer born in Sonvilier
- Ferdinand Gonseth, Swiss mathematician and philosopher born in Sonvilier

== Bibliography ==
- Levy, Carl (2019), The Palgrave Handbook of Anarchism, Cham: Palgrave Macmillan, ISBN 978-3-319-75619-6
