= Suze (river) =

River in the Bernese Jura, Canton of Bern, Switzerland

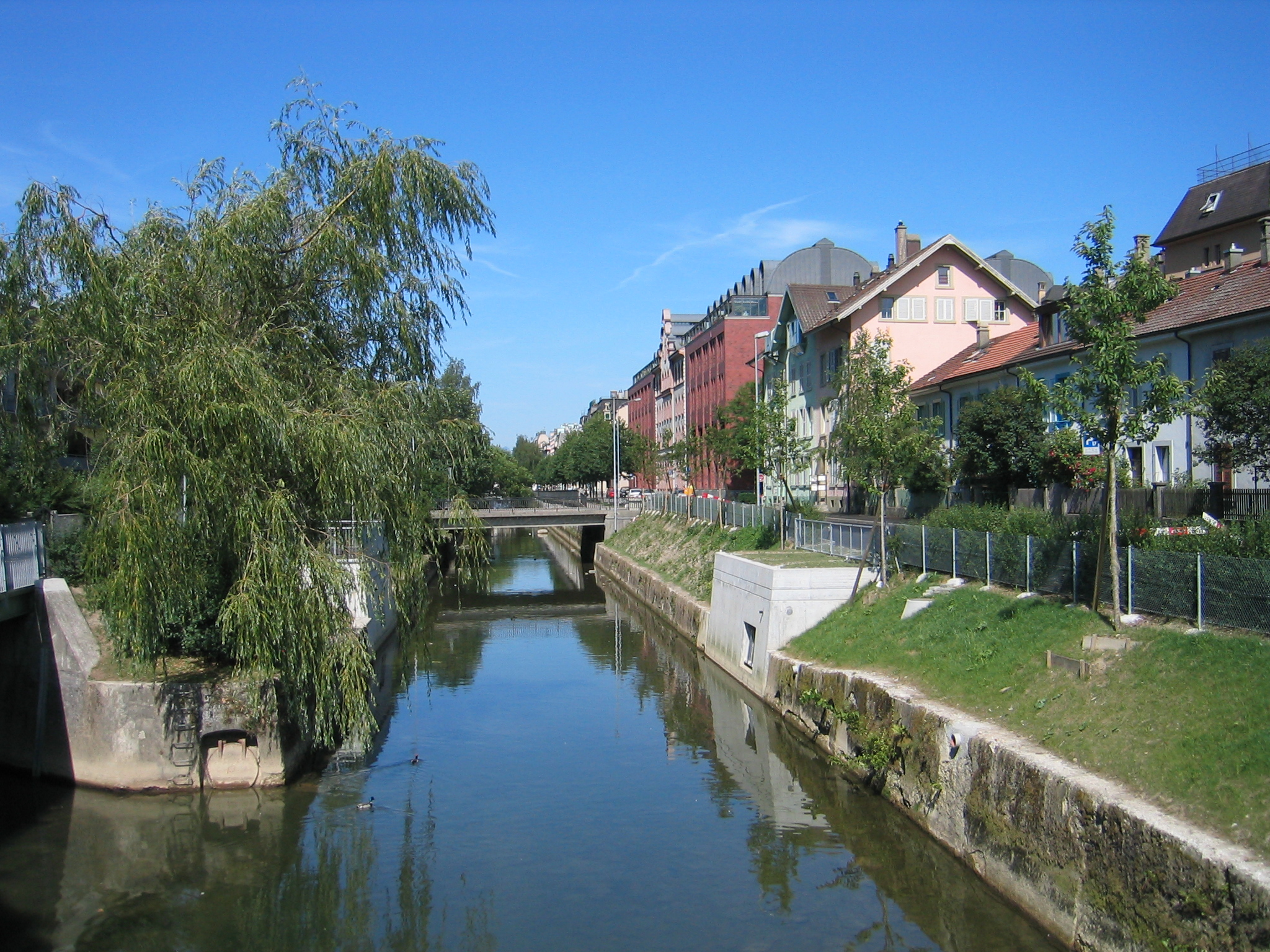

Location
- Country: Switzerland

Physical characteristics
- Source
  - coordinates: 47°05′39″N 6°52′12″E
- Mouth: Lake Biel
  - coordinates: 47.1319°N 7.2337°E

Basin features
- Progression: Lake Biel→ Aare→ Rhine→ North Sea

The Suze (German: Schüss) is a river in the Bernese Jura, canton of Bern, Switzerland.

== Down flow ==
It takes its source in a moorland at over 900 metres of altitude, in the high valley of Les Convers, (see: Renan). It flows down the whole length of the valley of Saint-Imier (Erguel), leaving it through the gorge of Taubenloch, it flows across the city of Biel/Bienne into the Lake of Bienne, at the altitude of 429 metres, upon a stretch of 45 kilometres. It leaves it through the last leg of the Thielle river, merging into the Nidau-Büren channel (Aare river), just before the regulating dam Port.

== Tributaries ==
Its main tributaries are la Dou, la Raissette, le Terbez and l'Orvine.

== History ==
On December 21, 1991, the river has provoked significant flooding along its course: i.e. in Sonceboz, its level had raised by a significant 1.10 meter, with 65 cubic meters of water per second.

== See also ==
- Jura water correction
- List of rivers of Switzerland
