= Sauge =

- Municipality
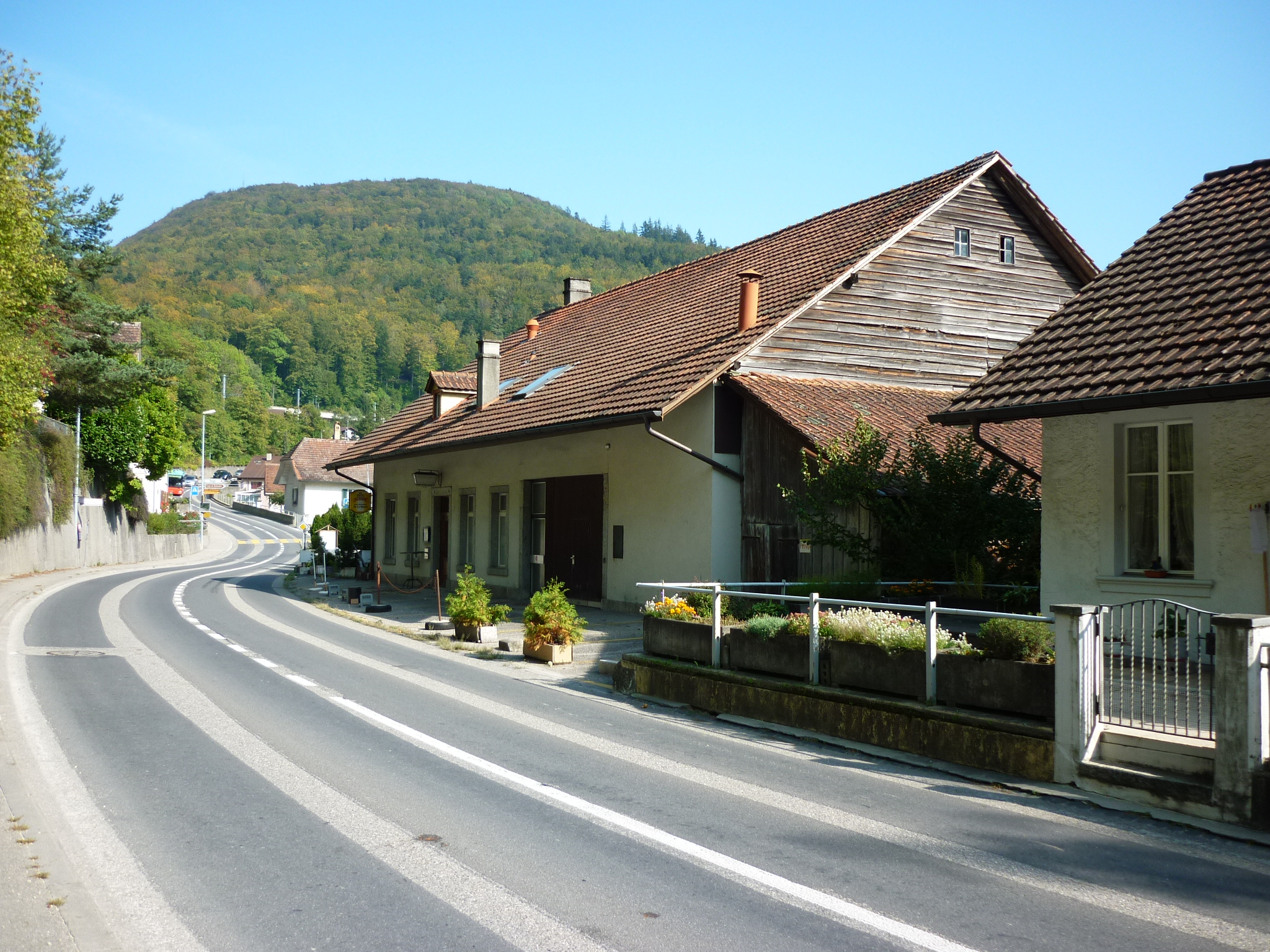
- Frinvillier village main street

- Flag Coat of arms
- Location of Sauge
- Location within Switzerland Location within Canton of Bern
- Coordinates: 47°11′N 7°18′E
- Country: Switzerland
- Canton: Bern
- District: Jura bernois

Government
  - Mayor: Maire; Pierre-Alain Grosjean

Area
  - Total: 13.44 km^{2} (5.19 sq mi)

Population (Dec 2012)
  - Total: 772
  - Density: 57.4/km^{2} (149/sq mi)
- Time zone: UTC+01:00 (CET)
  - Summer (DST): UTC+02:00 (CEST)
- Postal code: 2536-37
- SFOS number: 449
- ISO 3166 code: CH-BE
- Surrounded by: Orvin, Péry, Romont, Pieterlen, Biel/Bienne
- Website: http://www.sauge-jb.ch/ SFSO statistics

Sauge (French pronunciation: [soʒ]) is a municipality in the Jura bernois administrative district in the canton of Bern in Switzerland. It is located in the French-speaking Bernese Jura (Jura Bernois). On 1 January 2014 the former municipalities of Plagne and Vauffelin merged into the municipality of Sauge.

== History ==
=== Plagne ===
Plagne is first mentioned in 1311 as Blenn, though this comes from a 1441 copy of the original document. In 1610 it was mentioned as Plaentsch. The municipality was formerly known by its German name Plentsch, however, that name is no longer used.

In 1311 Plagne was part of a fief owned by the Basel Cathedral that was granted to Bourkard de La Roche. It was part of the seigniory of Erguel which was owned by the Prince Bishop of Basel. After the 1797 French victory and the Treaty of Campo Formio, Plagne became part of the French Département of Mont-Terrible. A few years later, it became part of the Département of Haut-Rhin. After Napoleon's defeat and the Congress of Vienna, Plagne was assigned to the Canton of Bern in 1815. In 1862 a fire destroyed the village core and it had to be rebuilt in the following years.

During the Early Modern Era, in addition to agriculture, some of the residents mined a small ore deposit south of Les Ferrières or mined white pottery clay. At the end of the 18th Century many residents began making watch parts in home workshops. Beginning in the 1970s the village's population grew rapidly as commuters to Biel/Bienne moved out to Plagne.

=== Vauffelin ===
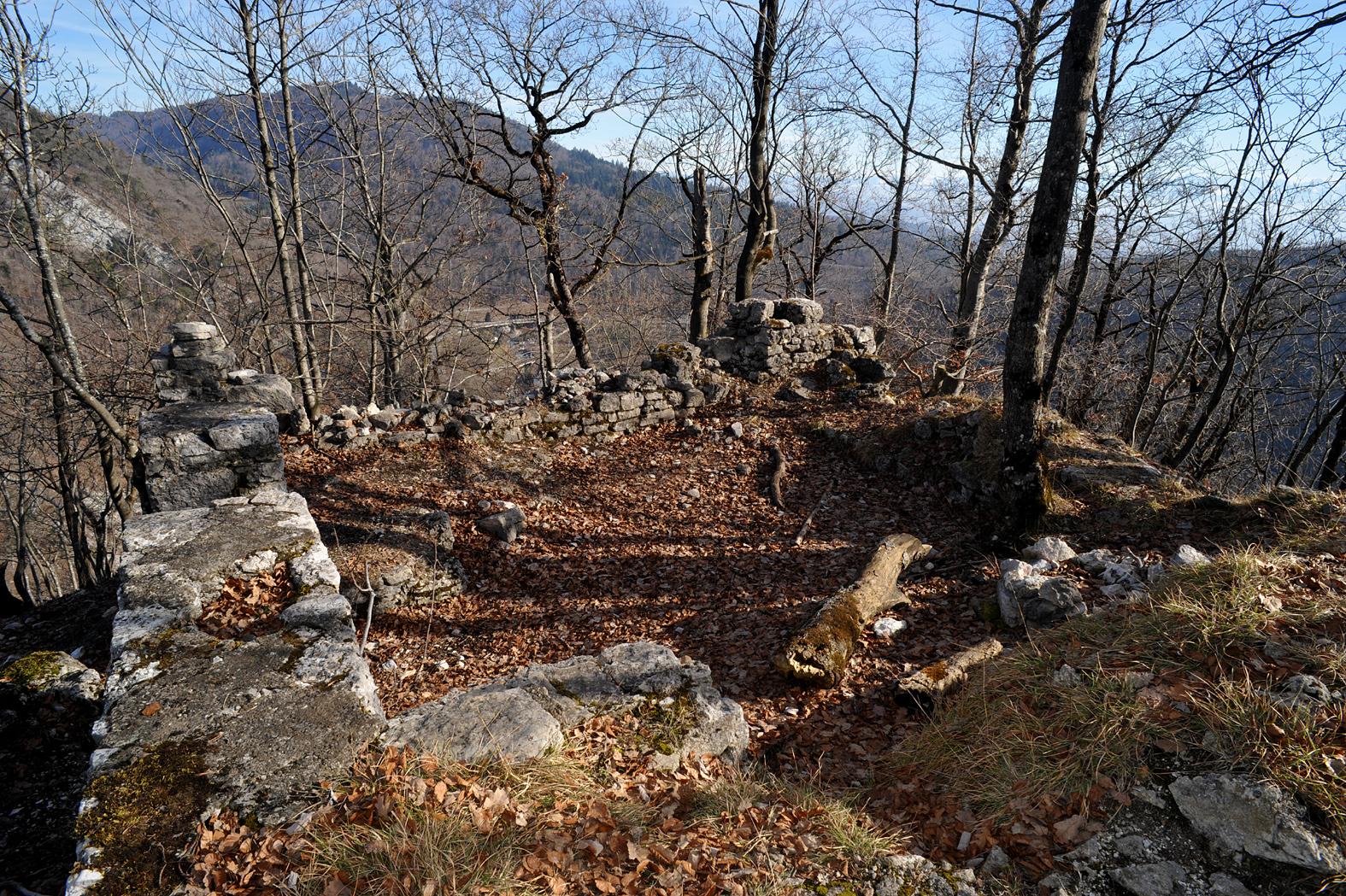
Ruins of a Roman watchtower at Rondchâtel

Vauffelin and its parish is first mentioned in the Lausanne Chartular of 1228 as Vualfelim. It was formerly known by its German names Füglistal or Füglisthal though this name is no longer used. The village of Frinvillier was first mentioned in 1393 as Frunwelier.

Frinvillier was located at the intersection of two important Roman roads, one leading from Petinesca (now Studen) over the Pierre Pertuis pass to Augusta Raurica (near Augst) and the road from Eburodunum (now Yverdon) over the Plateau de Diesse to Salodurum (Solothurn). A watch tower was built on at Rondchâtel to guard the road.

In 1364, Count Thierstein granted the patronage rights of the village church to the Church of St. Benedict in Biel. During the Late Middle Ages and the Early Modern Era it was part of the seigniory of Erguel under the Prince-Bishop of Basel. After the 1797 French victory and the Treaty of Campo Formio, Vauffelin became part of the French Département of Mont-Terrible. Three years later, in 1800 it became part of the Département of Haut-Rhin. After Napoleon's defeat and the Congress of Vienna, Vauffelin was assigned to the Canton of Bern in 1815.

Vauffelin converted to the new Reformed faith in 1530, when Biel adopted the new faith. Originally the pastor of Orvin supported the church in Vauffelin. After 1798 the pastor in Péry took over that responsibility. In 1839 the Vauffelin parish was created with Romont. The parish was originally administered by a deacon, but it received its own priest in 1860. The church was built in 1715-16 and renovated in 1932-34 and again in 1983. In 2010, Vauffelin, Péry-La Heutte and Orvin joined the parish of Rondchâtel.

During the 1970s the village population increased as commuters who worked in Biel moved into the village. In 1971, the villages of Vauffelin, Romont and Frinvillier formed a school district.

== Geography ==
The former municipalities that now make up Sauge have a total combined area of 13.46 km^{2} (5.20 sq mi).

== Demographics ==
The total population of Sauge (as of December 2020) is 827.

== Historic population ==
The historical population is given in the following chart:

== Sights ==
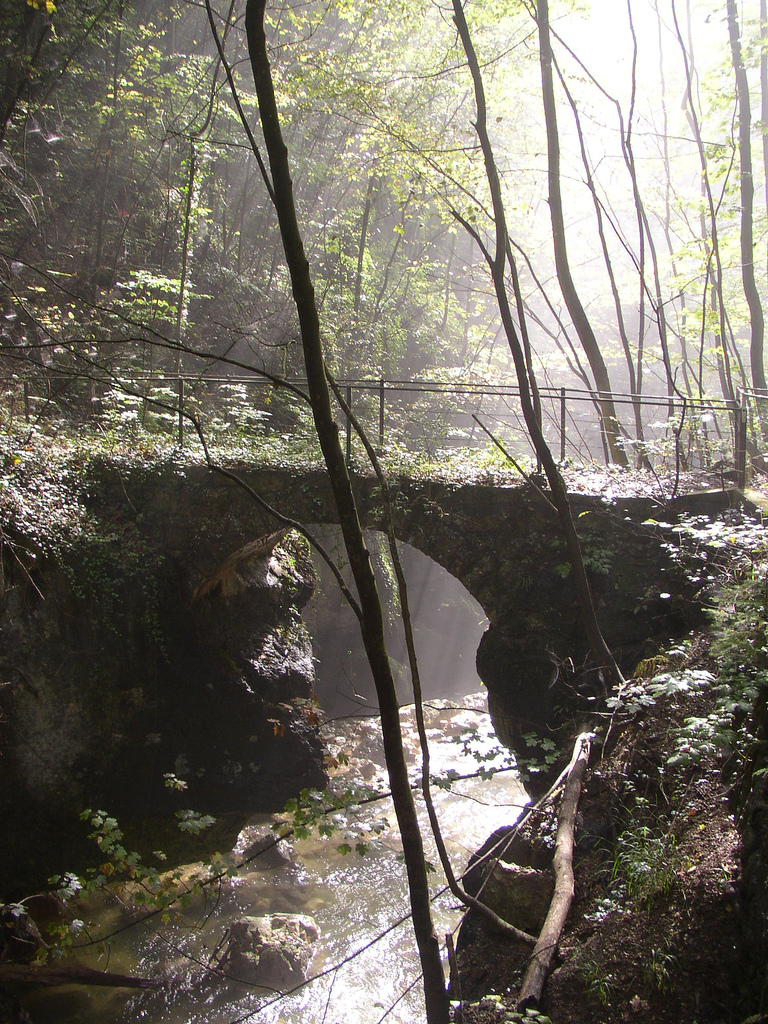
Taubenlochschlucht

The entire Taubenlochschlucht (Taubenloch Canyon), which is shared between Biel/Bienne, Orvin, Péry and Sauge, is designated as part of the Inventory of Swiss Heritage Sites.

== Transportation ==
The Frinvillier-Taubenloch railway station is located on the western edge of the municipality. It is on the Biel/Bienne–La Chaux-de-Fonds line and has hourly service to Biel/Bienne, Moutier, and La Chaux-de-Fonds.
