= Courtelary District =

Coordinates: 47.1667°N 7.06667°E

Courtelary District District de Courtelary
- District
- Flag Coat of arms

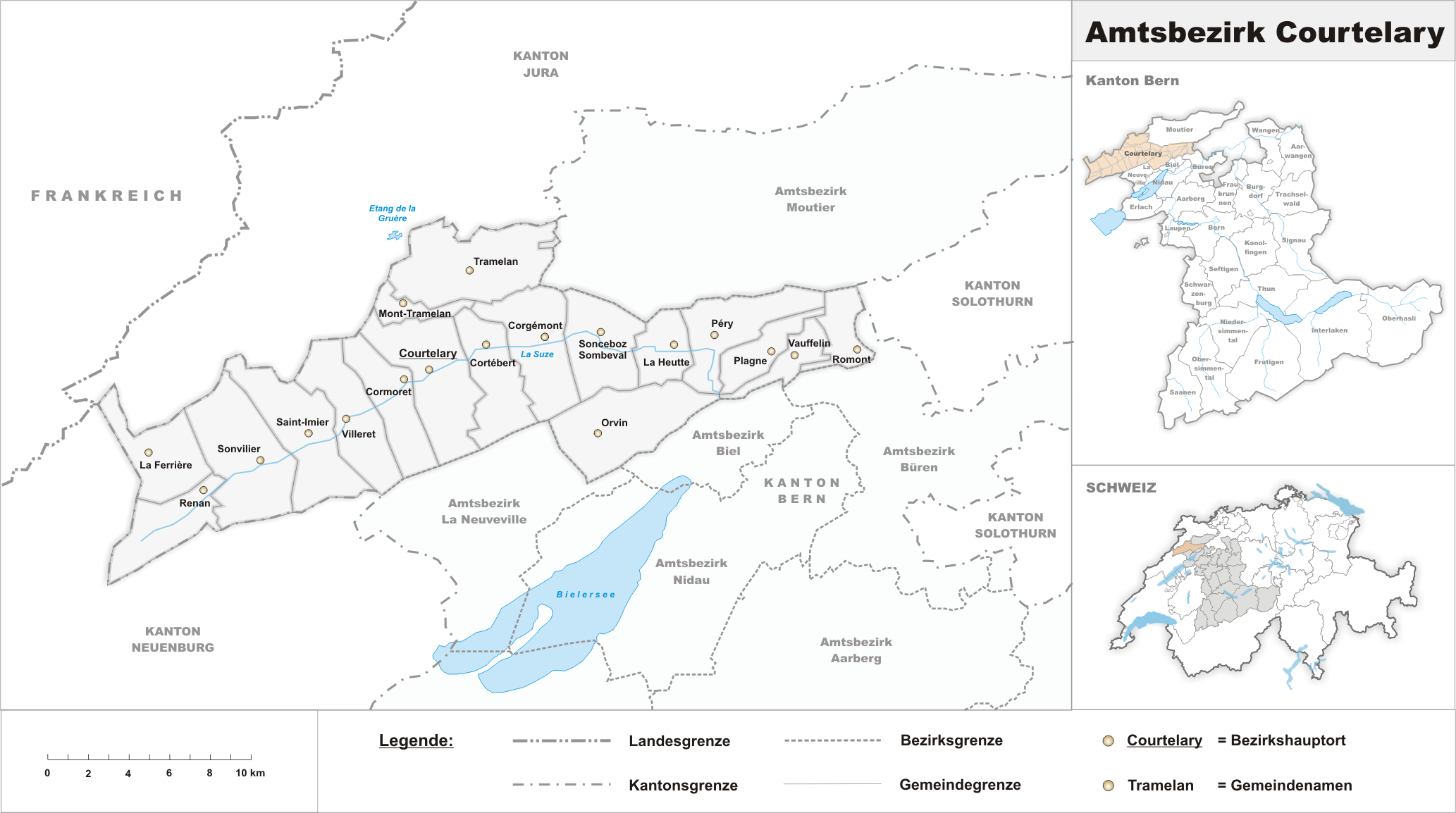
- Country: Switzerland
- Canton: Bern
- Capital: Courtelary

Area
  - Total: 266 km^{2} (103 sq mi)

Population (2007)
  - Total: 22,262
  - Density: 83.7/km^{2} (217/sq mi)
- Time zone: UTC+1 (CET)
  - Summer (DST): UTC+2 (CEST)
- Municipalities: 18

Courtelary District is located in Switzerland and is one of the three French-speaking districts of the Bernese Jura, along with La Neuveville and Moutier. The district is located in the canton of Bern with the seat being Courtelary. It had a population of about 22,224 in 2004. The three districts lost their administrative power and were merged on 1 January 2010 to form the new district of Jura Bernois with the capital at Courtelary.

Since 2010, it remains a fully recognised district under the law and the Constitution (Art.3 al.2) of the Canton of Berne.

| Municipality | Population (2004) | Area (km²) |
|---|---|---|
| Corgémont | 1532 | 17.60 |
| Cormoret | 528 | 13.43 |
| Cortébert | 737 | 14.75 |
| Courtelary | 1163 | 22.24 |
| La Ferrière | 550 | 14.23 |
| La Heutte | 481 | 8.00 |
| Mont-Tramelan | 133 | 4.64 |
| Orvin | 1207 | 21.43 |
| Péry | 1361 | 15.57 |
| Plagne | 391 | 7.55 |
| Renan | 790 | 12.62 |
| Romont | 213 | 7.07 |
| Saint-Imier | 4756 | 20.86 |
| Sonceboz-Sombeval | 1684 | 15.03 |
| Sonvilier | 1090 | 23.78 |
| Tramelan | 4263 | 24.88 |
| Vauffelin | 431 | 5.92 |
| Villeret | 914 | 16.22 |
