= Plagne, Switzerland =

Plagne
- Former municipality
- Flag Coat of arms
- Location of Plagne
- Location within Switzerland Location within Canton of Bern
- Coordinates: 47°11′N 7°17′E
- Country: Switzerland
- Canton: Bern
- District: Jura bernois

Area
  - Total: 7.55 km^{2} (2.92 sq mi)
- Elevation: 862 m (2,828 ft)

Population (December 2020)
  - Total: 361
  - Density: 47.8/km^{2} (124/sq mi)
- Time zone: UTC+01:00 (CET)
  - Summer (DST): UTC+02:00 (CEST)
- Postal code: 2536
- SFOS number: 440
- ISO 3166 code: CH-BE
- Surrounded by: Péry, Vauffelin, Romont
- Website: www.plagne.ch

Plagne (French pronunciation: [plaɲ]) is a former municipality in the Jura bernois administrative district in the canton of Bern in Switzerland. It is located in the French-speaking Bernese Jura (Jura Bernois). On 1 January 2014 the former municipalities of Plagne and Vauffelin merged into the new municipality of Sauge.

== History ==
Plagne is first mentioned in 1311 as Blenn, though this comes from a 1441 copy of the original document. In 1610 it was mentioned as Plaentsch. The municipality was formerly known by its German name Plentsch, however, that name is no longer used.

In 1311 Plagne was part of a fief owned by the Basel Cathedral that was granted to Bourkard de La Roche. It was part of the seigniory of Erguel which was owned by the Prince Bishop of Basel. After the 1797 French victory and the Treaty of Campo Formio, Plagne became part of the French Département of Mont-Terrible. A few years later, it became part of the Département of Haut-Rhin. After Napoleon's defeat and the Congress of Vienna, Plagne was assigned to the Canton of Bern in 1815. In 1862 a fire destroyed the village core and it had to be rebuilt in the following years.

During the Early Modern Era, in addition to agriculture, some of the residents mined a small ore deposit south of Les Ferrières or mined white pottery clay. At the end of the 18th Century many residents began making watch parts in home workshops. Beginning in the 1970s the village's population grew rapidly as commuters to Biel/Bienne moved out to Plagne.

== Geography ==
Before the merger, Plagne had a total area of 7.5 km^{2} (2.9 mi^{2}). Of this area, 2.53 km^{2} (0.98 mi^{2}) or 33.8% is used for agricultural purposes, while 4.62 km^{2} (1.78 mi^{2}) or 61.8% is forested. Of the rest of the land, 0.35 km^{2} (0.14 mi^{2}) or 4.7% is settled (buildings or roads).

Of the built up area, housing and buildings made up 3.2% and transportation infrastructure made up 1.2%. Out of the forested land, 54.5% of the total land area is heavily forested and 7.2% is covered with orchards or small clusters of trees. Of the agricultural land, 6.4% is used for growing crops and 16.8% is pastures and 10.2% is used for alpine pastures.

The former municipality is located on the mountain slopes above the Vauffelin valley.

On 31 December 2009 District de Courtelary, the municipality's former district, was dissolved. On the following day, 1 January 2010, it joined the newly created Arrondissement administratif Jura bernois.

== Coat of arms ==
The blazon of the municipal coat of arms is Per pale Or and Gules overall three Cauldrons counterchanged.

== Demographics ==
Plagne had a population (as of 2011) of 364. As of 2010, 2.8% of the population are resident foreign nationals. Over the last 10 years (2000–2010) the population has changed at a rate of -9.1%. Migration accounted for -10.6%, while births and deaths accounted for -3.5%.

Most of the population (as of 2000) speaks French (300 or 76.3%) as their first language, German is the second most common (83 or 21.1%) and Italian is the third (3 or 0.8%).

As of 2008, the population was 50.4% male and 49.6% female. The population was made up of 177 Swiss men (49.0% of the population) and 5 (1.4%) non-Swiss men. There were 174 Swiss women (48.2%) and 5 (1.4%) non-Swiss women. Of the population in the municipality, 153 or about 38.9% were born in Plagne and lived there in 2000. There were 137 or 34.9% who were born in the same canton, while 54 or 13.7% were born somewhere else in Switzerland, and 33 or 8.4% were born outside of Switzerland.

As of 2010, children and teenagers (0–19 years old) make up 19.7% of the population, while adults (20–64 years old) make up 52.9% and seniors (over 64 years old) make up 27.4%.

As of 2000, there were 149 people who were single and never married in the municipality. There were 200 married individuals, 22 widows or widowers and 22 individuals who are divorced.

As of 2000, there were 43 households that consist of only one person and 13 households with five or more people. In 2000, a total of 154 apartments (62.6% of the total) were permanently occupied, while 71 apartments (28.9%) were seasonally occupied and 21 apartments (8.5%) were empty. The vacancy rate for the municipality, in 2011, was 1.55%.

The historical population is given in the following chart:

== Politics ==
In the 2011 federal election the most popular party was the Swiss People's Party (SVP) which received 34.2% of the vote. The next three most popular parties were the Social Democratic Party (SP) (19.2%), the Green Party (10.7%) and the Conservative Democratic Party (BDP) (9.1%). In the federal election, a total of 107 votes were cast, and the voter turnout was 36.0%.

== Economy ==
As of 2011, Plagne had an unemployment rate of 0.8%. As of 2008, there were a total of 50 people employed in the municipality. Of these, there were 8 people employed in the primary economic sector and about 3 businesses involved in this sector. 5 people were employed in the secondary sector and there were 3 businesses in this sector. 37 people were employed in the tertiary sector, with 11 businesses in this sector.

In 2008 there were a total of 36 full-time equivalent jobs. The number of jobs in the primary sector was 6, all of which were in agriculture. The number of jobs in the secondary sector was 5 of which 3 were in manufacturing and 2 were in construction. The number of jobs in the tertiary sector was 25. In the tertiary sector; 2 or 8.0% were in wholesale or retail sales or the repair of motor vehicles, 4 or 16.0% were in the movement and storage of goods, 6 or 24.0% were in a hotel or restaurant, 2 or 8.0% were technical professionals or scientists, 3 or 12.0% were in education and 3 or 12.0% were in health care.

In 2000, there were 12 workers who commuted into the municipality and 147 workers who commuted away. The municipality is a net exporter of workers, with about 12.3 workers leaving the municipality for every one entering. Of the working population, 12.4% used public transportation to get to work, and 67.4% used a private car.

== Religion ==
From the 2000 census, 55 or 14.0% were Roman Catholic, while 270 or 68.7% belonged to the Swiss Reformed Church. Of the rest of the population, there were 10 individuals (or about 2.54% of the population) who belonged to another Christian church. There was 1 individual who was Islamic. 54 (or about 13.74% of the population) belonged to no church, are agnostic or atheist, and 8 individuals (or about 2.04% of the population) did not answer the question.

== Education ==
In Plagne about 149 or (37.9%) of the population have completed non-mandatory upper secondary education, and 38 or (9.7%) have completed additional higher education (either university or a Fachhochschule). Of the 38 who completed tertiary schooling, 52.6% were Swiss men, 39.5% were Swiss women.

The Canton of Bern school system provides one year of non-obligatory Kindergarten, followed by six years of Primary school. This is followed by three years of obligatory lower Secondary school where the students are separated according to ability and aptitude. Following the lower Secondary students may attend additional schooling or they may enter an apprenticeship.

During the 2010–11 school year, there were a total of 19 students attending classes in Plagne. There was one kindergarten class with a total of 19 students in the municipality. Of the kindergarten students, 5.3% were permanent or temporary residents of Switzerland (not citizens) and 26.3% have a different mother language than the classroom language.

As of 2000, there were 25 students from Plagne who attended schools outside the municipality.
