= Pieterlen =

- Municipality
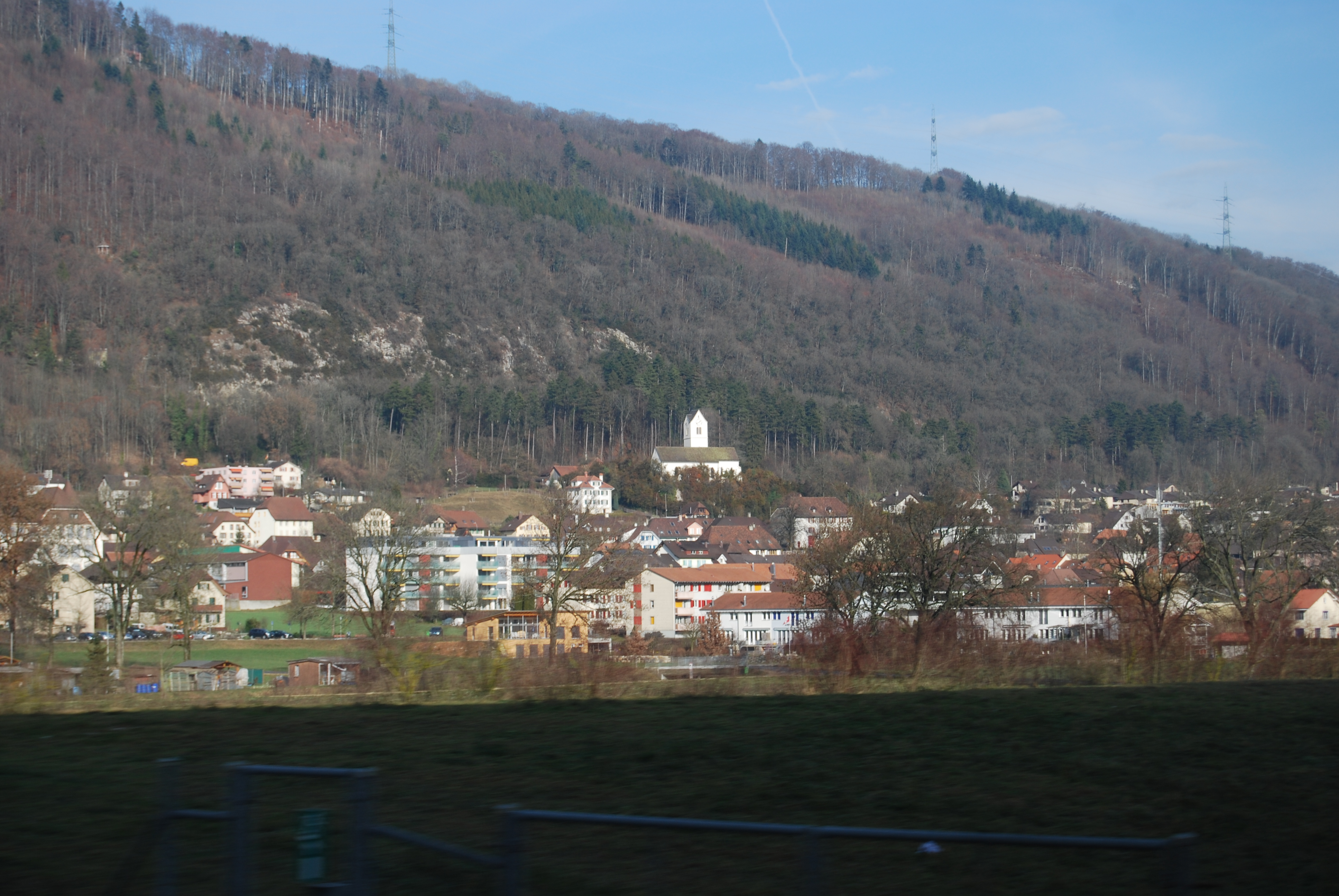

- Flag Coat of arms
- Location of Pieterlen
- Location within Switzerland Location within Canton of Bern
- Coordinates: 47°11′N 7°20′E
- Country: Switzerland
- Canton: Bern
- District: Biel/Bienne

Government
  - Executive: Gemeinderat with 6 members
  - Mayor: Gemeindepräsident; Beat Rüfli FDP/PLR (as of 2026)

Area
  - Total: 8.3 km^{2} (3.2 sq mi)
- Elevation: 436 m (1,430 ft)

Population (December 2020)
  - Total: 4,784
  - Density: 580/km^{2} (1,500/sq mi)
- Time zone: UTC+01:00 (CET)
  - Summer (DST): UTC+02:00 (CEST)
- Postal code: 2542
- SFOS number: 392
- ISO 3166 code: CH-BE
- Surrounded by: Lengnau, Meinisberg, Safnern, Biel/Bienne, Vauffelin, Romont
- Website: www.pieterlen.ch

Pieterlen (French: Perles) is a municipality in the Biel/Bienne administrative district in the canton of Bern in Switzerland.

== History ==
Pieterlen is first mentioned in 1228 as Perla. In 1268 it was mentioned as Bieterlo.

The Vorem Holz 3 archeological site contains the remains of a Bronze Age settlement in the Pieterlen municipality. A first- to third-century Roman estate has also been discovered. During the Middle Ages there were several settlements in the modern municipal borders. A medieval bath house was found at Thürliweg. The early medieval Totenweg cemetery served two different settlements during the 7th-8th centuries. A medieval fortification at Gräuschenhubel has also been discovered. During the Late Middle Ages the village was mentioned as the personal property of the Lords of Pieterlan. By the end of the 13th century, the village passed through the hands of a number of nobles before ending up under the Prince-Bishop of Basel. Under the Prince-Bishops the village was combined with Romont, Reiben (now part of Büren an der Aare and Meinisberg) to form the southernmost ecclesiastical district of the Erguel seigniory. The low court met in Pieterlen while the high court was in Reiben and was held on the bridge over the Aare river. Militarily it was part of the banner of Biel.

In 1797 the region was invaded and annexed by France. It was initially part of the Département of Mont-Terrible, but in 1800 it was transferred to the Département of Haut-Rhin. After the collapse of Napoleonic France in 1815, the village was assigned to the Canton of Bern and in the following year it became part of the newly created Büren District. In 1833 the old parish was divided into four new political municipalities; Pieterlen, Meinisberg, Reiben (joined Büren an der Aare in 1911) and Romont (joined the Courtelary District in 1840).

The village Church of St. Martin was first mentioned in 1228, though it was built on the site of an earlier, probably 10th century, church. The modern church's nave was built in 1615 and remodeled in 1858. The choir is decorated with medieval murals and the grave plate of the Lords of Eptingen-Wildenstein from the 14th century. The right to appoint the village priest was given to Bellelay Abbey in 1416. Despite the Protestant Reformation and the church becoming Protestant in 1529, the Abbey continued to exercise this right until the secularization of the Abbey in 1797. Today the Reformed parish of Pieterlen includes Meinisberg.

Starting in 1860, a number of small businesses and cottage workshops began manufacturing watch and clock parts. The Olten-Biel railroad built a station in the village in 1857. Around 1900 a watch factory and a brick works opened in the village. By 1904 the watch factory employed 80 workers. The factories, good roads and railroad connections transformed Pieterlen from a farming village, producing grain and wine, into an industrial town. The rapidly growing population required places to live so the workers' settlement of Sonnenhof and the new neighborhoods of Rebenweg, Romontweg, Rain and Löschgatter were built to house them. After the departure of the watch industry in the 1970s and 1980s, the town diversified its industrial base and built the Industrie-West industrial zone. In 2005 nearly half (49%) of the working population work in industry, while 47% work in the services sector. Starting in 2002, a section of the A5 motorway from Solothurn to Biel was built through the municipality.

Aerial view from 400 m by Walter Mittelholzer (1925)

The Schlössli, a country estate for the Wildermeth family of Biel, was built in 1838. Today it is the retirement home Schlössli. The secondary school opened in the village in 1907. The nature reserve Felsenheide was established outside the town in 1952.

== Geography ==
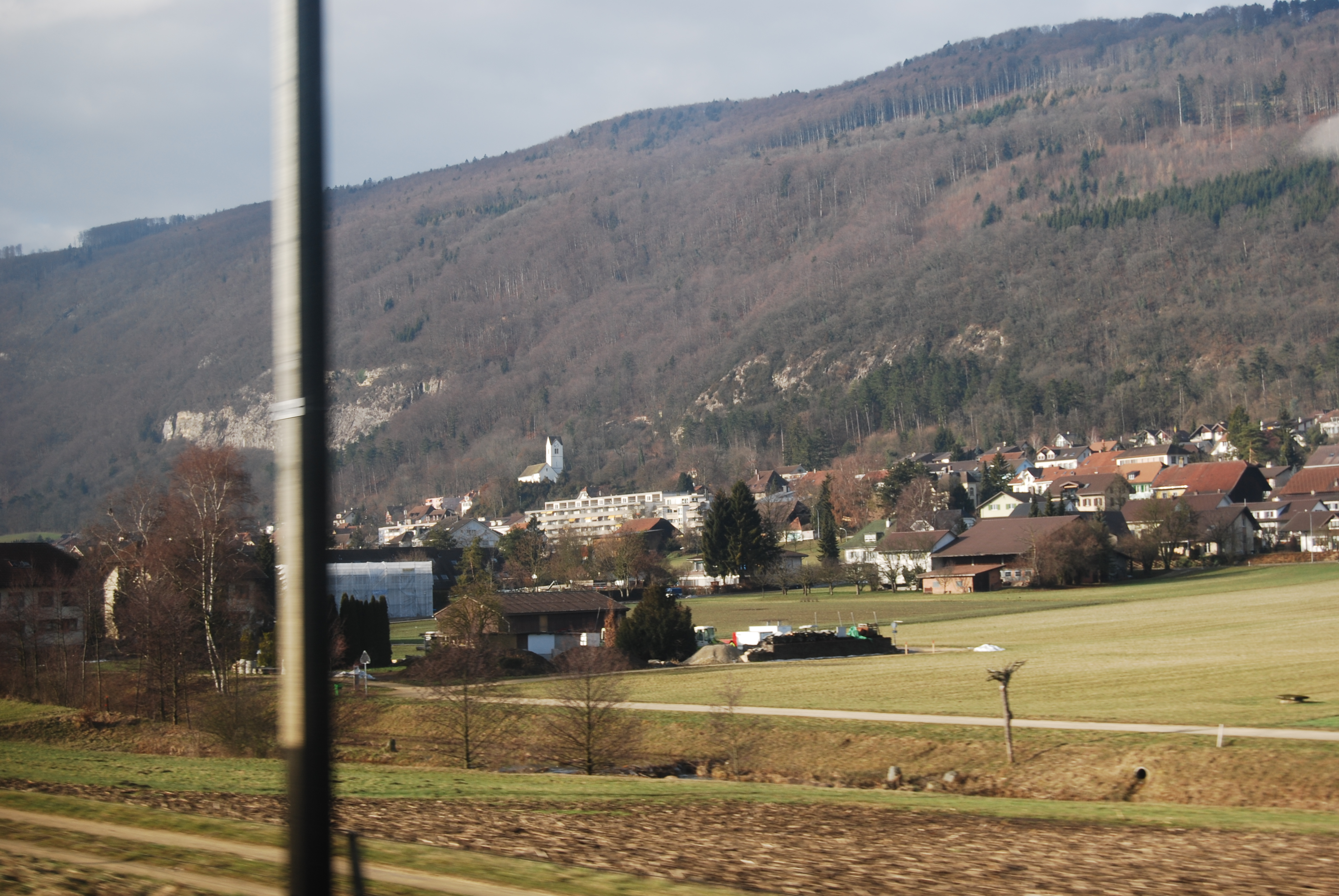
View of Pieterlen and the neighboring mountain

Pieterlen has an area of 8.35 km^{2} (3.22 sq mi). Of this area, 2.58 km^{2} (1.00 mi^{2}) or 31.0% is used for agricultural purposes, while 3.92 km^{2} (1.51 mi^{2}) or 47.1% is forested. Of the rest of the land, 1.63 km^{2} (0.63 mi^{2}) or 19.6% is settled (buildings or roads), 0.13 km^{2} (32 acres) or 1.6% is either rivers or lakes and 0.04 km^{2} (9.9 acres) or 0.5% is unproductive land.

Of the built up area, industrial buildings made up 2.5% of the total area while housing and buildings made up 7.8% and transportation infrastructure made up 6.1%. Power and water infrastructure as well as other special developed areas made up 1.7% of the area while parks, green belts and sports fields made up 1.4%. Out of the forested land, all of the forested land area is covered with heavy forests. Of the agricultural land, 25.0% is used for growing crops and 4.9% is pastures, while 1.1% is used for orchards or vine crops. All the water in the municipality is flowing water.

The municipality is located between the Jura Mountains and the Büttenberg mountain in the Bernese Seeland.

On 31 December 2009 Amtsbezirk Büren, the municipality's former district, was dissolved. On the following day, 1 January 2010, it joined the newly created Verwaltungskreis Biel/Bienne.

== Coat of arms ==
The blazon of the municipal coat of arms is Or a Lion rampant Gules overall a Bar Azure.

== Demographics ==
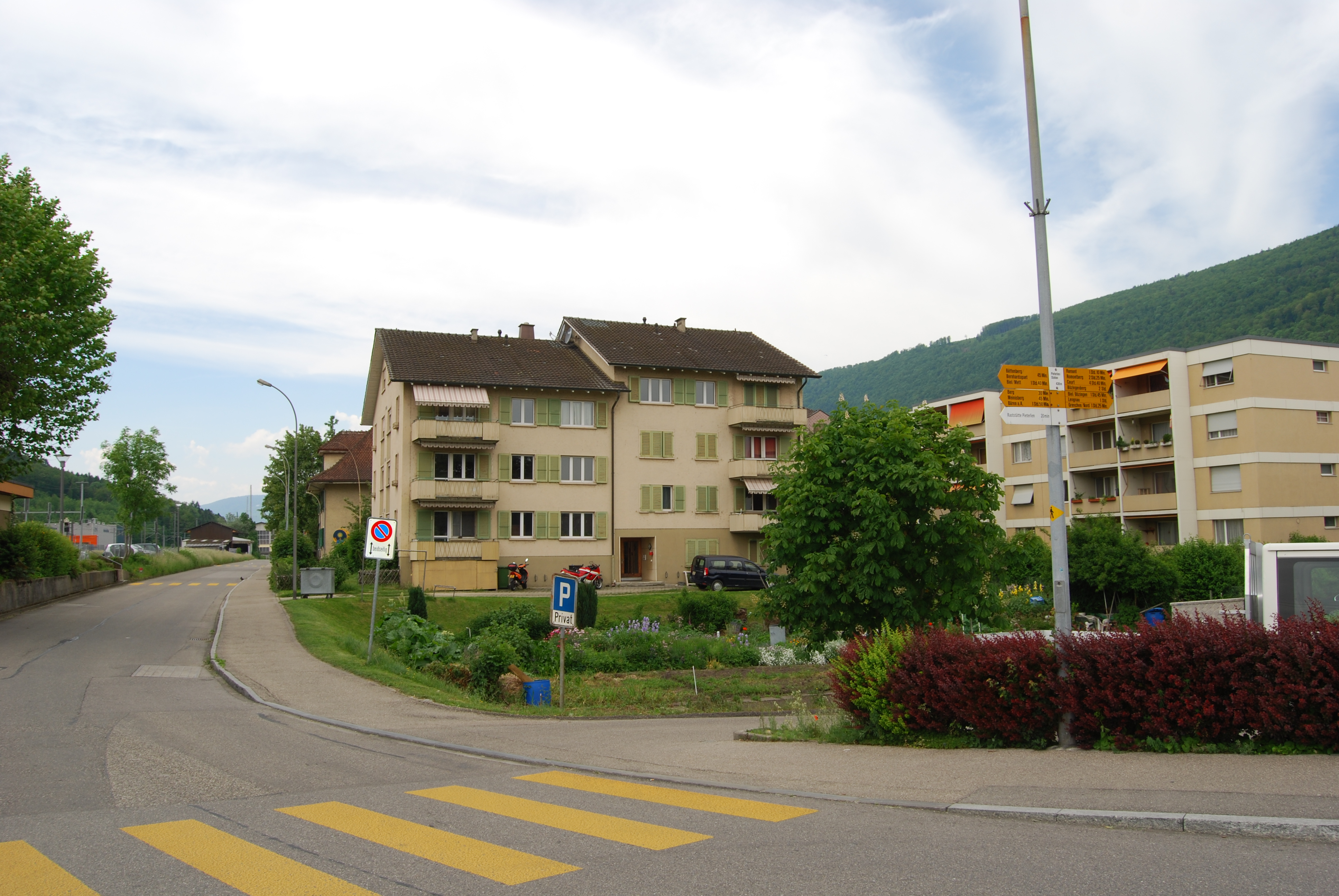
Apartment buildings in Pieterlen

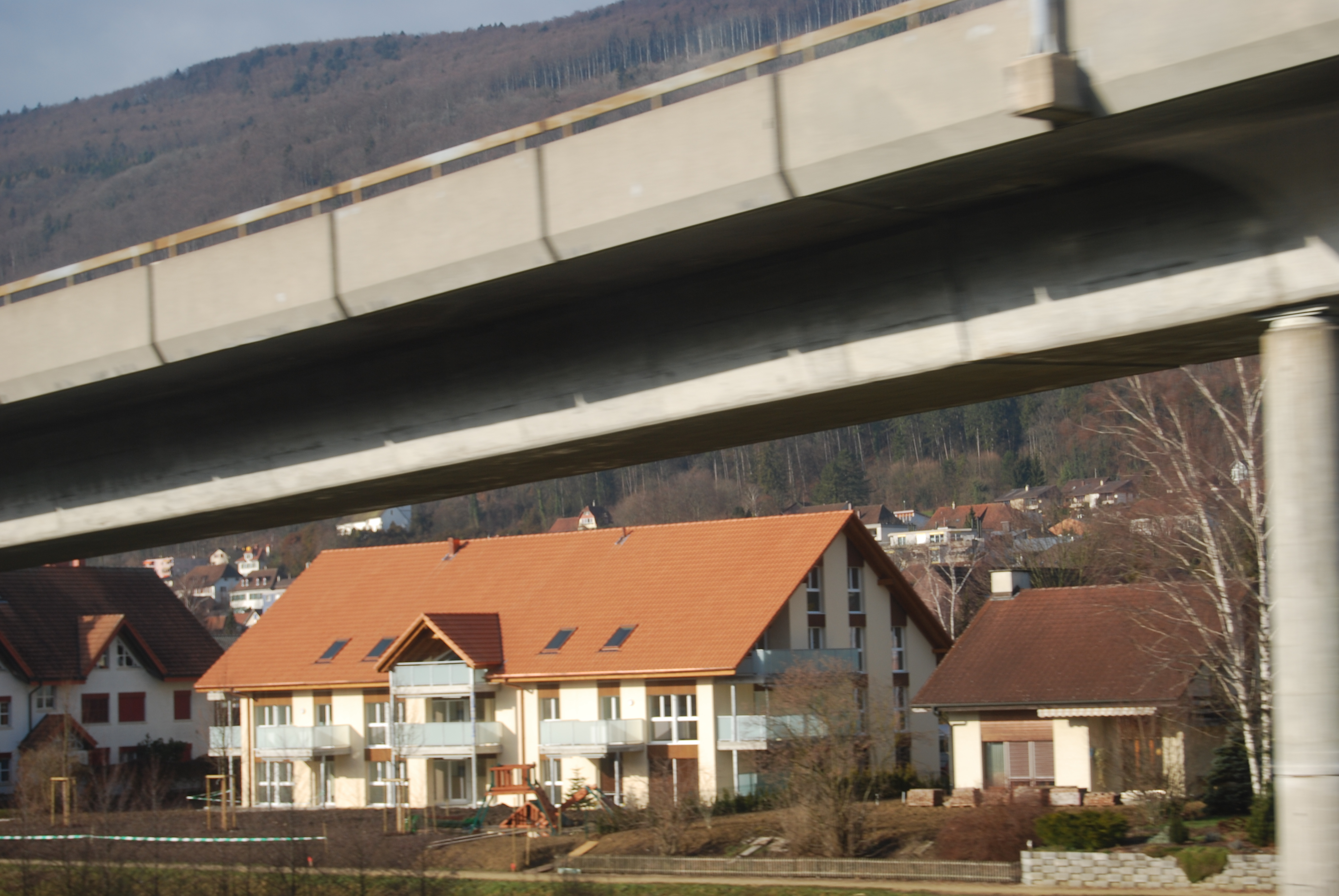
Motorway bridge near the town

Pieterlen has a population (as of December 2020) of 4,784. As of 2010, 21.4% of the population are resident foreign nationals. Over the last 10 years (2000-2010) the population has changed at a rate of 8.5%. Migration accounted for 8.1%, while births and deaths accounted for 0.5%.

Most of the population (as of 2000) speaks German (2,832 or 86.3%) as their first language, French is the second most common (116 or 3.5%) and Albanian is the third (95 or 2.9%). There are 81 people who speak Italian and 6 people who speak Romansh.

As of 2008, the population was 49.1% male and 50.9% female. The population was made up of 1,342 Swiss men (37.9% of the population) and 396 (11.2%) non-Swiss men. There were 1,444 Swiss women (40.8%) and 36 (1.0%) non-Swiss women. Of the population in the municipality, 847 or about 25.8% were born in Pieterlen and lived there in 2000. There were 1,149 or 35.0% who were born in the same canton, while 577 or 17.6% were born somewhere else in Switzerland, and 555 or 16.9% were born outside of Switzerland.

As of 2010, children and teenagers (0–19 years old) make up 20.8% of the population, while adults (20–64 years old) make up 62.2% and seniors (over 64 years old) make up 17%.

As of 2000, there were 1,223 people who were single and never married in the municipality. There were 1,603 married individuals, 263 widows or widowers and 193 individuals who are divorced.

As of 2000, there were 444 households that consist of only one person and 88 households with five or more people. In 2000, a total of 1,331 apartments (83.9% of the total) were permanently occupied, while 144 apartments (9.1%) were seasonally occupied and 112 apartments (7.1%) were empty. As of 2010, the construction rate of new housing units was 26.2 new units per 1000 residents. The vacancy rate for the municipality, in 2011, was 4.81%.

The historical population is given in the following chart:

== Heritage sites of national significance ==
The medieval graveyard known as the Totenweg and Bünden and the medieval church are listed as a Swiss heritage site of national significance.

== Politics ==
In the 2011 federal election the most popular party was the SVP which received 31.8% of the vote. The next three most popular parties were the SPS (18.3%), the BDP Party (14.5%) and the FDP (12.1%). In the federal election, a total of 922 votes were cast, and the voter turnout was 39.2%.

== Economy ==
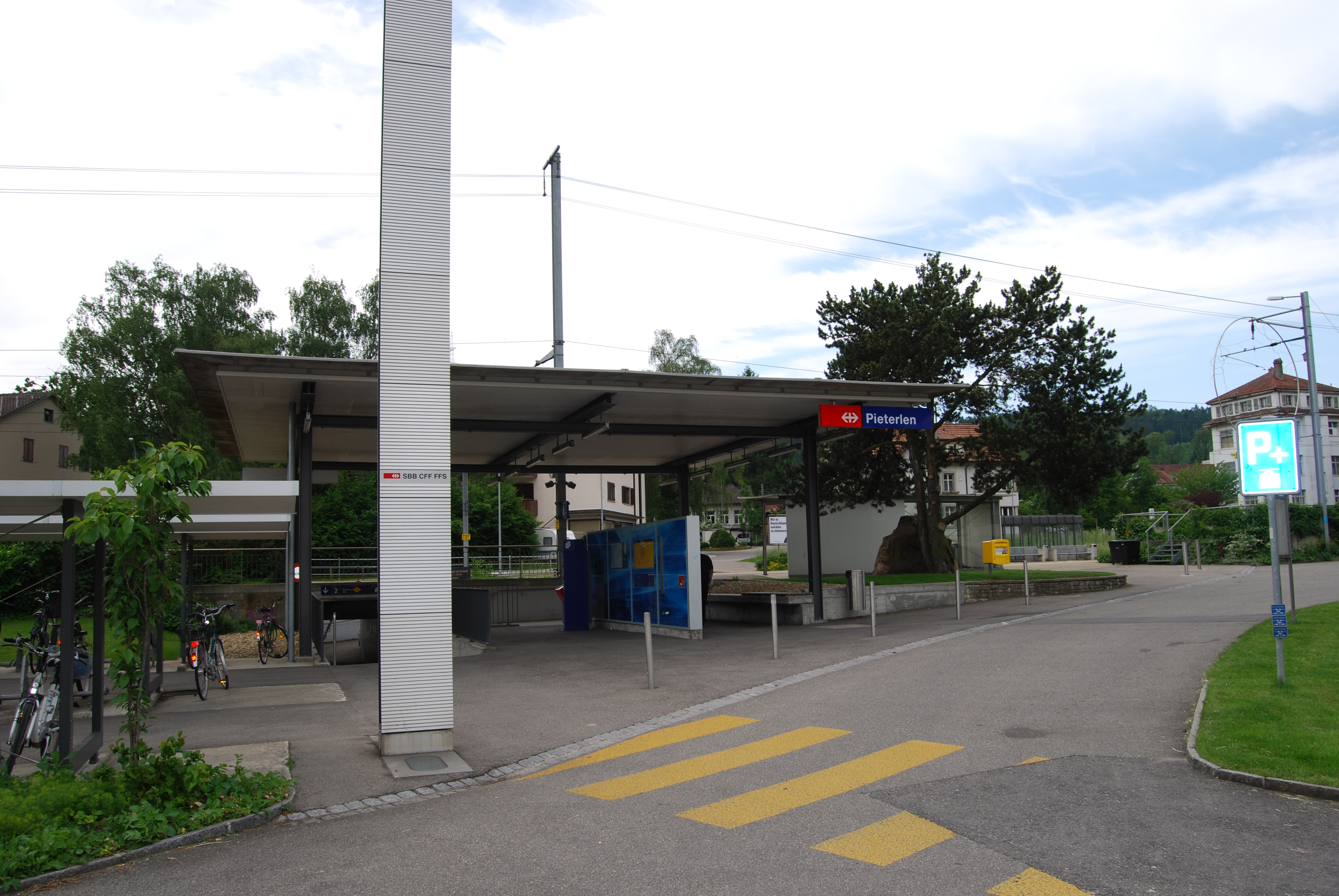
Pieterlen train station

As of 2011, Pieterlen had an unemployment rate of 3.14%. As of 2008, there were a total of 1,217 people employed in the municipality. Of these, there were 36 people employed in the primary economic sector and about 12 businesses involved in this sector. 591 people were employed in the secondary sector and there were 45 businesses in this sector. 590 people were employed in the tertiary sector, with 83 businesses in this sector.

In 2008 there were a total of 1,024 full-time equivalent jobs. The number of jobs in the primary sector was 26, of which 20 were in agriculture and 6 were in forestry or lumber production. The number of jobs in the secondary sector was 557 of which 458 or (82.2%) were in manufacturing and 97 (17.4%) were in construction. The number of jobs in the tertiary sector was 441. In the tertiary sector; 126 or 28.6% were in wholesale or retail sales or the repair of motor vehicles, 13 or 2.9% were in the movement and storage of goods, 50 or 11.3% were in a hotel or restaurant, 38 or 8.6% were technical professionals or scientists, 41 or 9.3% were in education and 134 or 30.4% were in health care.

In 2000, there were 638 workers who commuted into the municipality and 1,141 workers who commuted away. The municipality is a net exporter of workers, with about 1.8 workers leaving the municipality for every one entering. Of the working population, 17.1% used public transportation to get to work, and 56.1% used a private car.

== Religion ==
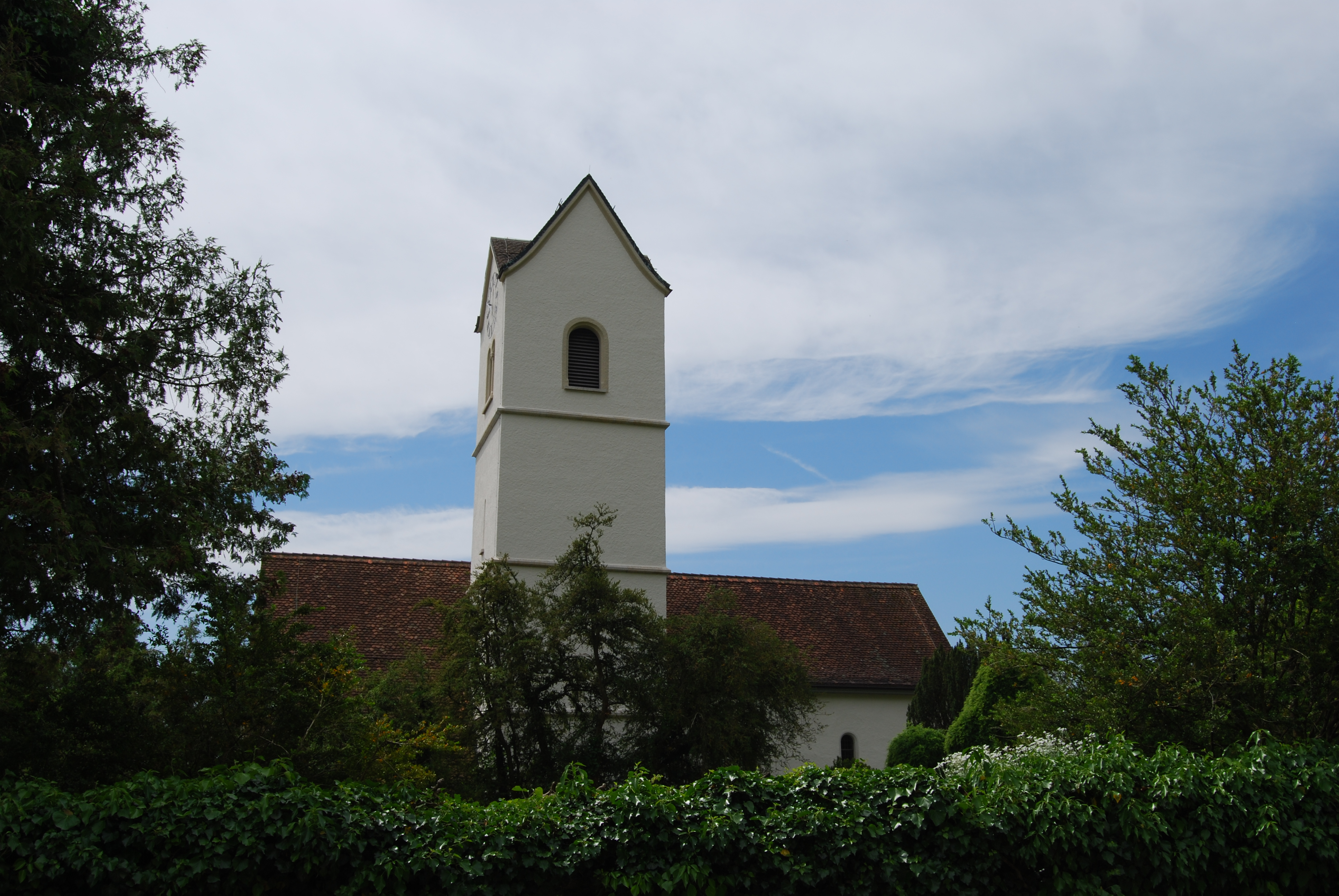
Pieterlen's Protestant church

From the 2000 census, 602 or 18.3% were Roman Catholic, while 1,845 or 56.2% belonged to the Swiss Reformed Church. Of the rest of the population, there were 45 members of an Orthodox church (or about 1.37% of the population), there were 4 individuals (or about 0.12% of the population) who belonged to the Christian Catholic Church, and there were 306 individuals (or about 9.32% of the population) who belonged to another Christian church. There were 4 individuals (or about 0.12% of the population) who were Jewish, and 212 (or about 6.46% of the population) who were Islamic. There were 2 individuals who were Buddhist, 26 individuals who were Hindu and 9 individuals who belonged to another church. 216 (or about 6.58% of the population) belonged to no church, are agnostic or atheist, and 162 individuals (or about 4.94% of the population) did not answer the question.

== Transport ==
Pieterlen sits on the Basel–Biel/Bienne and Jura Foot railway lines. It is served by regional trains at Pieterlen.

== Education ==
In Pieterlen about 1,261 or (38.4%) of the population have completed non-mandatory upper secondary education, and 302 or (9.2%) have completed additional higher education (either university or a Fachhochschule). Of the 302 who completed tertiary schooling, 72.8% were Swiss men, 17.2% were Swiss women, 6.6% were non-Swiss men and 3.3% were non-Swiss women.

The Canton of Bern school system provides one year of non-obligatory Kindergarten, followed by six years of Primary school. This is followed by three years of obligatory lower Secondary school where the students are separated according to ability and aptitude. Following the lower Secondary students may attend additional schooling or they may enter an apprenticeship.

During the 2009–10 school year, there were a total of 384 students attending classes in Pieterlen. There were 4 kindergarten classes with a total of 72 students in the municipality. Of the kindergarten students, 22.2% were permanent or temporary residents of Switzerland (not citizens) and 48.6% have a different mother language than the classroom language. The municipality had 10 primary classes and 206 students. Of the primary students, 33.5% were permanent or temporary residents of Switzerland (not citizens) and 32.5% have a different mother language than the classroom language. During the same year, there were 6 lower secondary classes with a total of 89 students. There were 24.7% who were permanent or temporary residents of Switzerland (not citizens) and 29.2% have a different mother language than the classroom language.

As of 2000, there were 3 students in Pieterlen who came from another municipality, while 90 residents attended schools outside the municipality.
