= Vauffelin =

- Former municipality
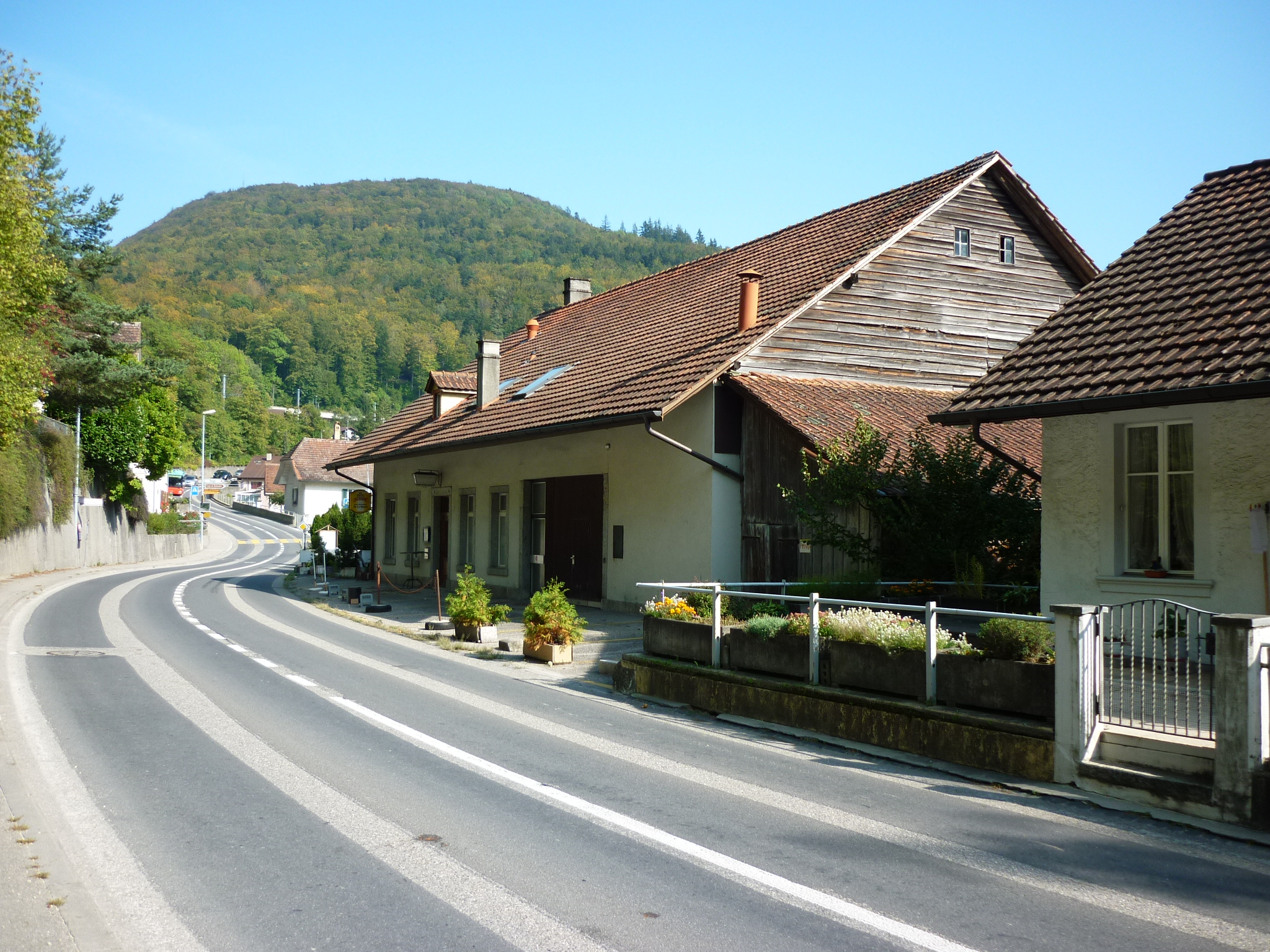
- Frinvillier village main street

- Flag Coat of arms
- Location of Vauffelin
- Location within Switzerland Location within Canton of Bern
- Coordinates: 47°11′N 7°18′E
- Country: Switzerland
- Canton: Bern
- District: Jura bernois

Area
  - Total: 5.92 km^{2} (2.29 sq mi)
- Elevation: 707 m (2,320 ft)

Population (Dec 2011)
  - Total: 427
  - Density: 72.1/km^{2} (187/sq mi)
- Time zone: UTC+01:00 (CET)
  - Summer (DST): UTC+02:00 (CEST)
- Postal code: 2537
- SFOS number: 447
- ISO 3166 code: CH-BE
- Surrounded by: Orvin, Péry, Plagne, Romont, Pieterlen, Biel/Bienne
- Website: www.vauffelin.ch

Vauffelin (French pronunciation: [voflɛ̃]) is a former municipality in the Jura bernois administrative district in the canton of Bern in Switzerland. It is located in the French-speaking Bernese Jura (Jura Bernois). On 1 January 2014 the former municipalities of Vauffelin and Plagne merged into the new municipality of Sauge.

== History ==
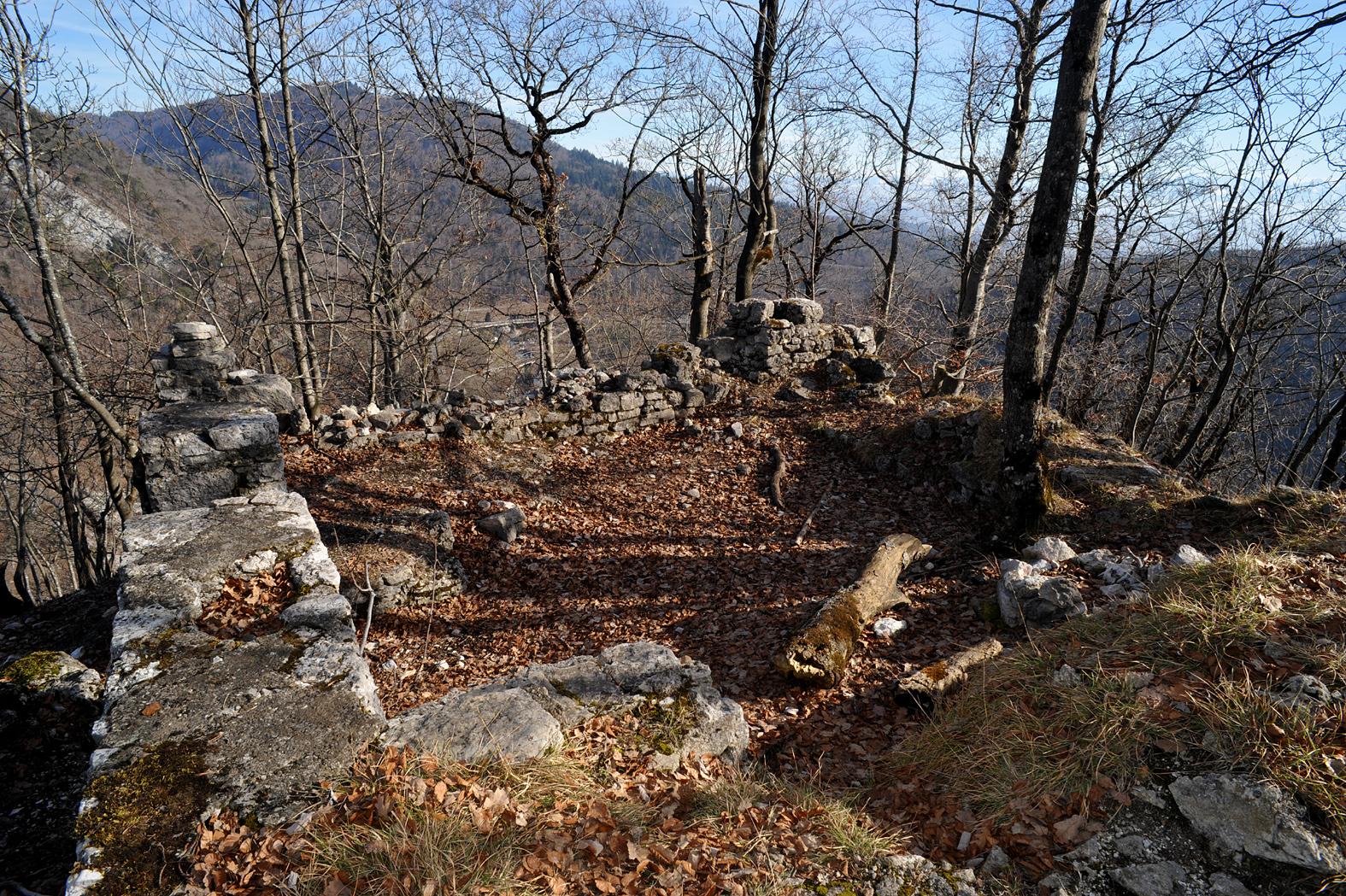
Ruins of a Roman watchtower at Rondchâtel

Vauffelin and its parish is first mentioned in the Lausanne Chartular of 1228 as Vualfelim. It was formerly known by its German names Füglistal or Füglisthal though this name is no longer used. The village of Frinvillier was first mentioned in 1393 as Frunwelier.

Frinvillier was located at the intersection of two important Roman roads, one leading from Petinesca (now Studen) over the Pierre Pertuis pass to Augusta Raurica (near Augst) and the road from Eburodunum (now Yverdon) over the Plateau de Diesse to Salodurum (Solothurn). A watch tower was built on at Rondchâtel to guard the road.

In 1364, Count Thierstein granted the patronage rights of the village church to the Church of St. Benedict in Biel. During the Late Middle Ages and the Early Modern Era it was part of the seigniory of Erguel under the Prince-Bishop of Basel. After the 1797 French victory and the Treaty of Campo Formio, Vauffelin became part of the French Département of Mont-Terrible. Three years later, in 1800 it became part of the Département of Haut-Rhin. After Napoleon's defeat and the Congress of Vienna, Vauffelin was assigned to the Canton of Bern in 1815.

Vauffelin converted to the new Reformed faith in 1530, when Biel adopted the new faith. Originally the pastor of Orvin supported the church in Vauffelin. After 1798 the pastor in Péry took over that responsibility. In 1839 the Vauffelin parish was created with Romont. The parish was originally administered by a deacon, but it received its own priest in 1860. The church was built in 1715-16 and renovated in 1932-34 and again in 1983. In 2010, Vauffelin, Péry-La Heutte and Orvin joined the parish of Rondchâtel.

During the 1970s the village population increased as commuters who worked in Biel moved into the village. In 1971, the villages of Vauffelin, Romont and Frinvillier formed a school district.

== Geography ==
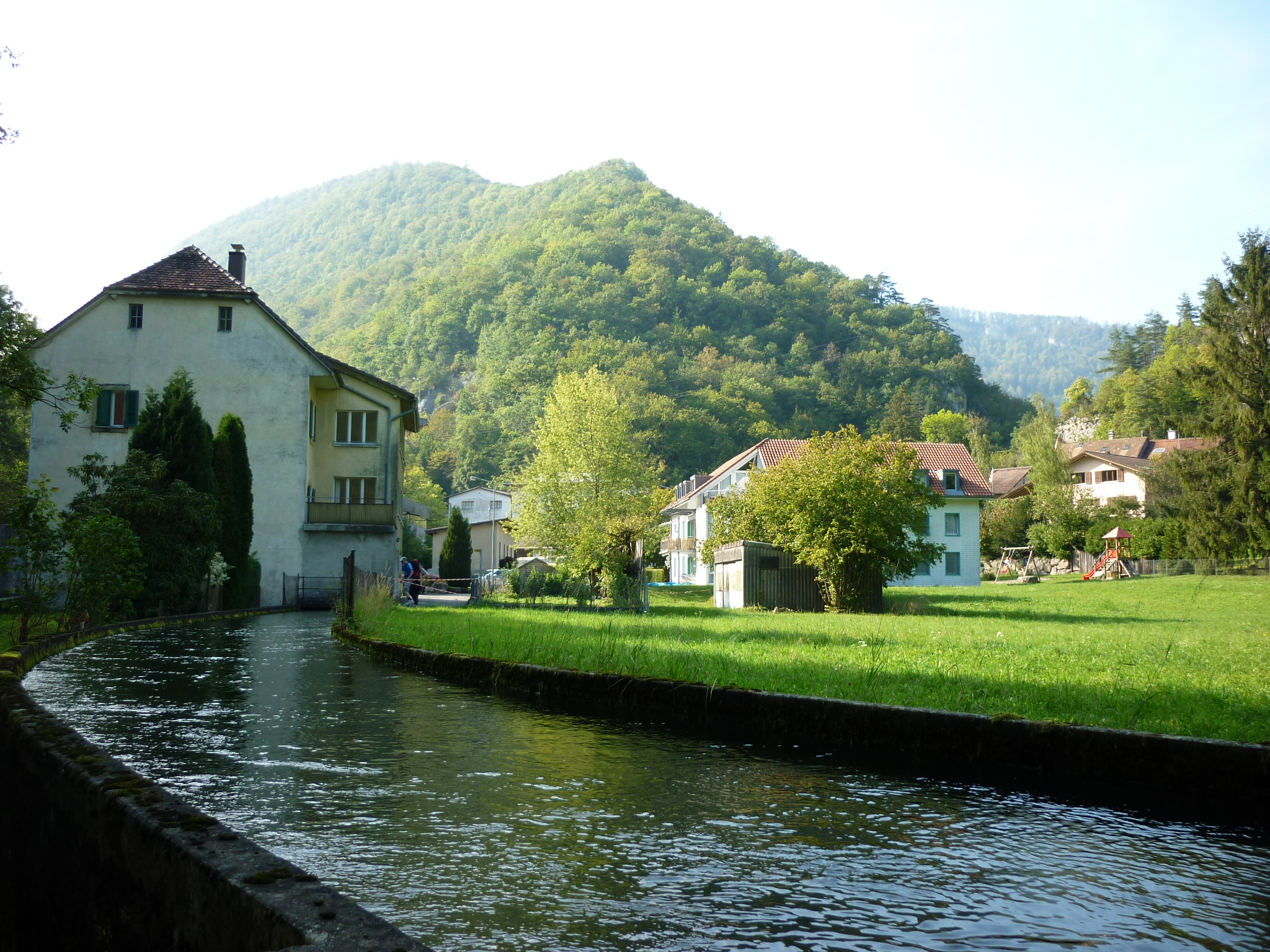
Suze river canal in Frinvillier

Before the merger, Vauffelin had a total area of 6.0 km^{2} (2.3 mi^{2}). Of this area, 2.13 km^{2} (0.82 mi^{2}) or 35.7% is used for agricultural purposes, while 3.39 km^{2} (1.31 mi^{2}) or 56.9% is forested. Of the rest of the land, 0.43 km^{2} (0.17 mi^{2}) or 7.2% is settled (buildings or roads) and 0.02 km^{2} (4.9 acres) or 0.3% is unproductive land.

Of the built up area, housing and buildings made up 4.2% and transportation infrastructure made up 1.8%. Out of the forested land, 52.3% of the total land area is heavily forested and 4.5% is covered with orchards or small clusters of trees. Of the agricultural land, 5.9% is used for growing crops and 19.5% is pastures and 10.2% is used for alpine pastures.

The former municipality is located in the Bernese Jura. It consists of the villages of Vauffelin and Frinvillier.

On 31 December 2009 District de Courtelary, the municipality's former district, was dissolved. On the following day, 1 January 2010, it joined the newly created Arrondissement administratif Jura bernois.

== Coat of arms ==
The blazon of the municipal coat of arms is Per pall Or and Gules overall a Wolf Sable langued armed and viriled of the second.

== Demographics ==
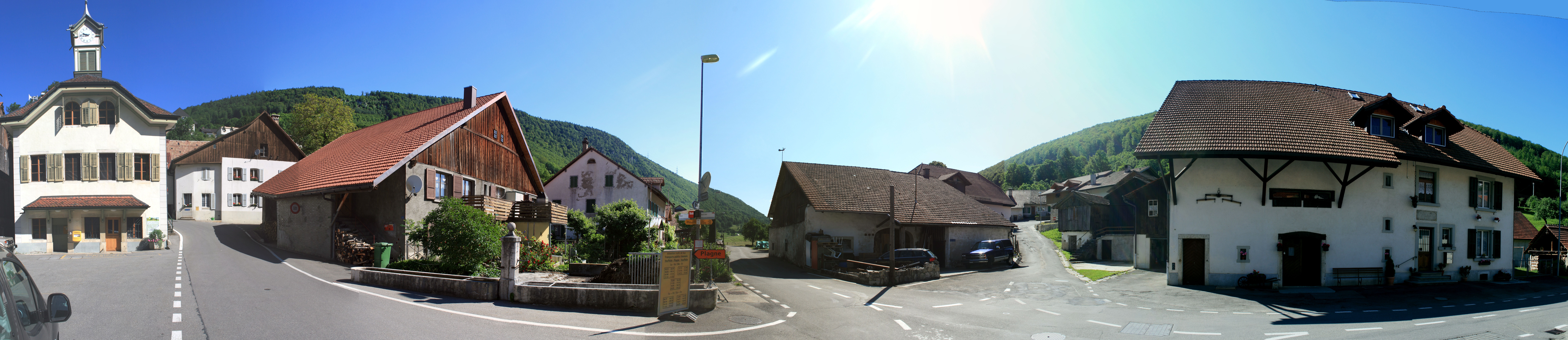
Panorama of the center of Vauffelin

Vauffelin had a population (as of 2011) of 427. As of 2010, 18.0% of the population are resident foreign nationals. Over the last 10 years (2000-2010) the population has changed at a rate of -0.9%. Migration accounted for 1.9%, while births and deaths accounted for 0.5%.

Most of the population (as of 2000) speaks French (289 or 64.9%) as their first language, German is the second most common (110 or 24.7%) and Albanian is the third (33 or 7.4%). There are 5 people who speak Italian.

As of 2008, the population was 51.8% male and 48.2% female. The population was made up of 181 Swiss men (41.3% of the population) and 46 (10.5%) non-Swiss men. There were 178 Swiss women (40.6%) and 33 (7.5%) non-Swiss women. Of the population in the municipality, 116 or about 26.1% were born in Vauffelin and lived there in 2000. There were 149 or 33.5% who were born in the same canton, while 75 or 16.9% were born somewhere else in Switzerland, and 97 or 21.8% were born outside of Switzerland.

As of 2010, children and teenagers (0–19 years old) make up 21.5% of the population, while adults (20–64 years old) make up 59.6% and seniors (over 64 years old) make up 18.9%.

As of 2000, there were 147 people who were single and never married in the municipality. There were 246 married individuals, 27 widows or widowers and 25 individuals who are divorced.

As of 2000, there were 50 households that consist of only one person and 14 households with five or more people. In 2000, a total of 183 apartments (61.4% of the total) were permanently occupied, while 87 apartments (29.2%) were seasonally occupied and 28 apartments (9.4%) were empty. The vacancy rate for the municipality, in 2011, was 1.71%.

The historical population is given in the following chart:

== Sights ==
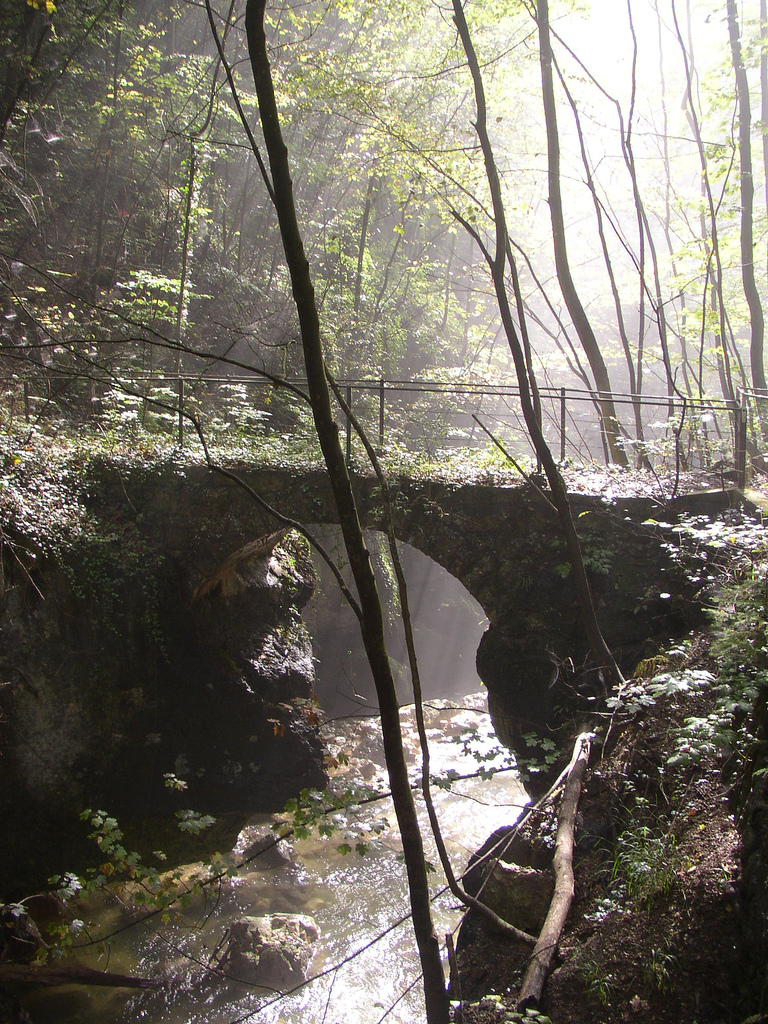
Taubenlochschlucht

The entire Taubenlochschlucht (Taubenloch Canyon), which is shared between Biel/Bienne, Orvin, Péry and Vauffelin, is designated as part of the Inventory of Swiss Heritage Sites.

== Politics ==
In the 2011 federal election the most popular party was the Swiss People's Party (SVP) which received 27.6% of the vote. The next two most popular parties were the Social Democratic Party (SP) (22.7%), and the Green Party (15.9%) . In the federal election, a total of 96 votes were cast, and the voter turnout was 33.7%.

== Economy ==
As of 2011, Vauffelin had an unemployment rate of 2.79%. As of 2008, there were a total of 81 people employed in the municipality. Of these, there were 12 people employed in the primary economic sector and about 5 businesses involved in this sector. 17 people were employed in the secondary sector and there were 3 businesses in this sector. 52 people were employed in the tertiary sector, with 7 businesses in this sector. There were 216 residents of the municipality who were employed in some capacity, of which females made up 40.3% of the workforce.

In 2008 there were a total of 70 full-time equivalent jobs. The number of jobs in the primary sector was 10, all of which were in agriculture. The number of jobs in the secondary sector was 13 of which 11 or (84.6%) were in manufacturing and 2 (15.4%) were in construction. The number of jobs in the tertiary sector was 47. In the tertiary sector; 3 or 6.4% were in wholesale or retail sales or the repair of motor vehicles, and 40 or 85.1% were technical professionals or scientists.

In 2000, there were 38 workers who commuted into the municipality and 173 workers who commuted away. The municipality is a net exporter of workers, with about 4.6 workers leaving the municipality for every one entering. Of the working population, 19.9% used public transportation to get to work, and 63.4% used a private car.

== Religion ==
From the 2000 census, 81 or 18.2% were Roman Catholic, while 228 or 51.2% belonged to the Swiss Reformed Church. Of the rest of the population, there were 24 individuals (or about 5.39% of the population) who belonged to another Christian church. There were 46 (or about 10.34% of the population) who were Islamic. There were 1 individual who belonged to another church. 56 (or about 12.58% of the population) belonged to no church, are agnostic or atheist, and 21 individuals (or about 4.72% of the population) did not answer the question.

== Education ==
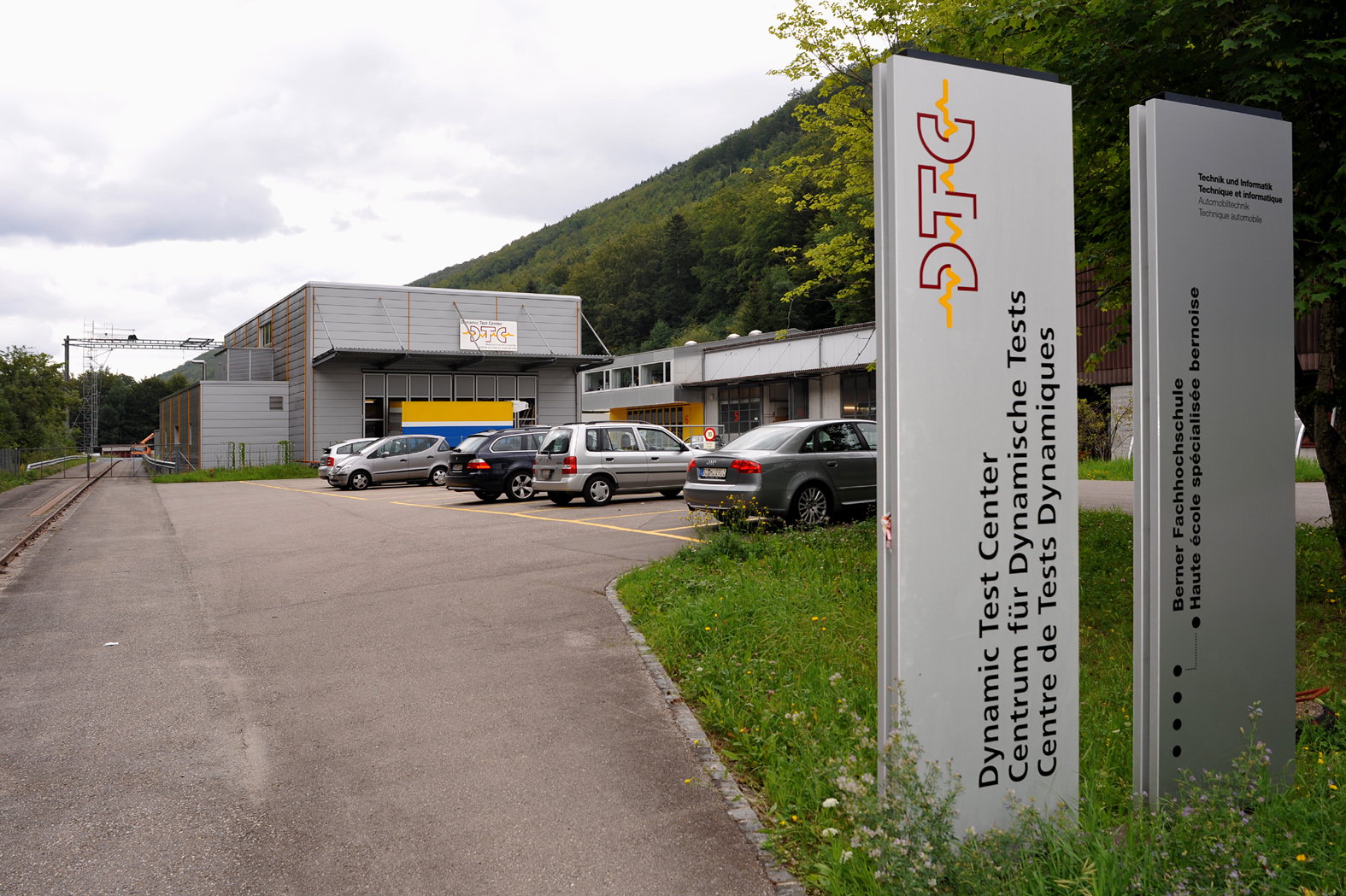
Dynamic Test Lab of the Bern University of Applied Sciences (BFH), Biel, in Vauffelin

In Vauffelin about 162 or (36.4%) of the population have completed non-mandatory upper secondary education, and 41 or (9.2%) have completed additional higher education (either university or a Fachhochschule). Of the 41 who completed tertiary schooling, 63.4% were Swiss men, 24.4% were Swiss women.

The canton of Bern school system provides one year of non-obligatory kindergarten, followed by six years of primary school. This is followed by three years of obligatory lower secondary school, where students are separated according to ability and aptitude. Following lower secondary school, students may attend additional schooling, or they may enter an apprenticeship.

During the 2010-11 school year, there were a total of 18 students attending classes in Vauffelin. There were no kindergarten classes in the municipality; all the students attended one primary school class. Of the primary students, 27.8% were permanent or temporary residents of Switzerland (not citizens), and 27.8% have a different mother language than the classroom language.

As of 2000, there were 5 students in Vauffelin who came from another municipality, while 56 residents attended schools outside the municipality.
