= Péry =

- Former municipality
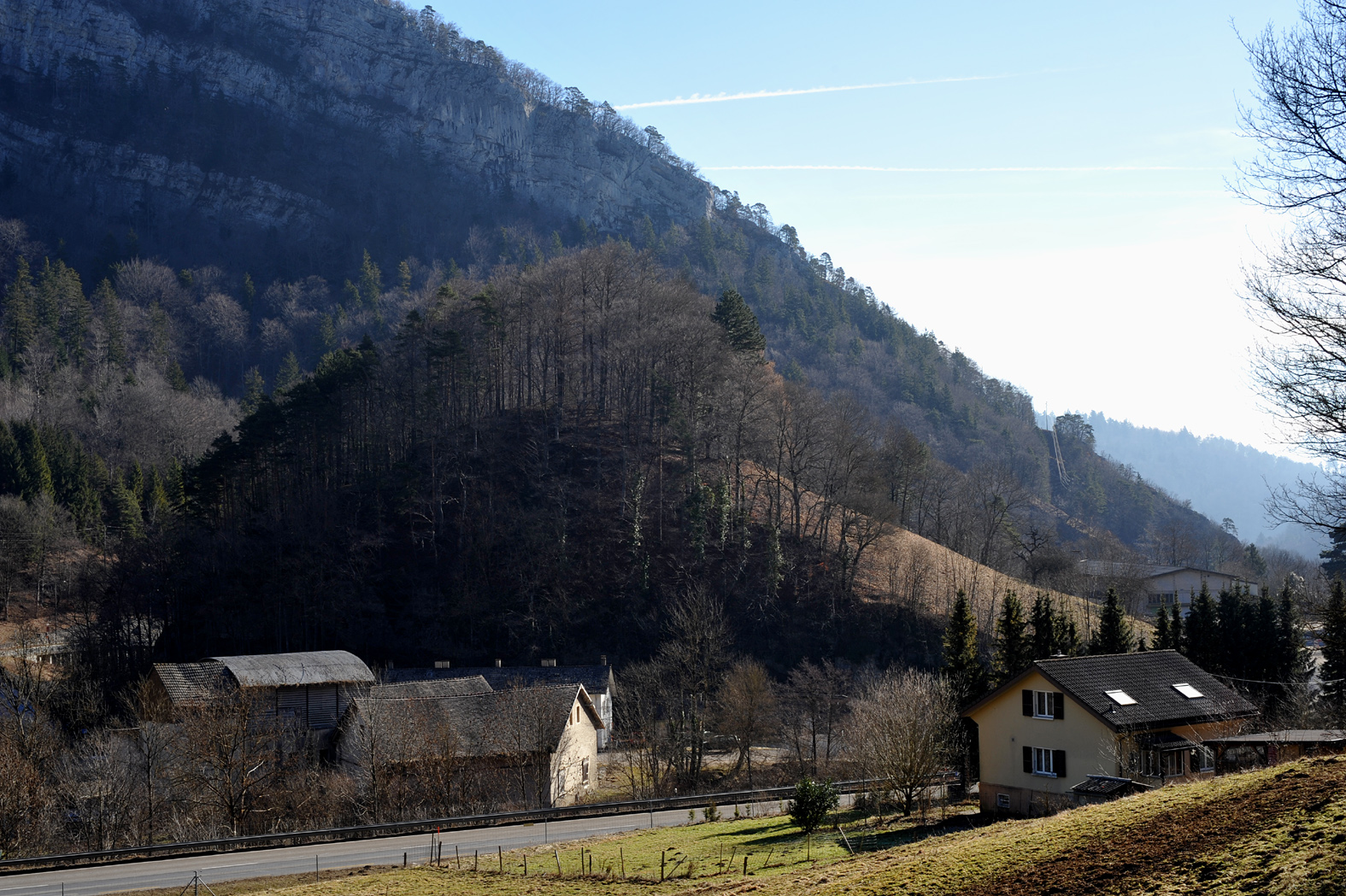
- Rondchâtel village in Péry municipality

- Flag Coat of arms
- Location of Péry
- Location within Switzerland Location within Canton of Bern
- Coordinates: 47°12′N 7°15′E
- Country: Switzerland
- Canton: Bern
- District: Jura bernois

Government
  - Mayor: Maire

Area
  - Total: 15.57 km^{2} (6.01 sq mi)
- Elevation: 635 m (2,083 ft)

Population (Dec 2013)
  - Total: 1,359
  - Density: 87.28/km^{2} (226.1/sq mi)
- Time zone: UTC+01:00 (CET)
  - Summer (DST): UTC+02:00 (CEST)
- Postal code: 2603
- SFOS number: 439
- ISO 3166 code: CH-BE
- Surrounded by: La Heutte, Orvin, Vauffelin, Plagne, Romont, Sorvilier, Bévilard, Malleray, Reconvilier
- Website: pery-laheutte.ch

Péry is part of the municipality of Péry-La Heutte in the Jura bernois administrative district in the canton of Bern in Switzerland. It is located in the French-speaking Bernese Jura (Jura Bernois).

== History ==
The first mention of Péry is in 884 where it is called villam Bedericam. In 1148 it was known as Peril, though that name comes from a 12th-century forgery. The municipality was formerly known by its German name Büderich, however, that name is no longer used.

In 884, Charles the Fat granted Péry to Moutier-Grandval Abbey. The Abbey owned the village and surrounding lands until 999 when the Prince-Bishop of Basel acquired the village. He incorporated it into the seigniory of Erguel and gave the village to the Lords of Péry who ruled from Châtillon Castle, now a ruin, on a nearby hill. Beginning in the 14th century the feudal levies from Péry were part of the Erguel army under the command of Biel. In 1530, Biel encouraged the village to accept the Protestant Reformation.

The village of Rondchâtel was independent of Péry until 1766. Based on the name, it is likely that a castle existed on the hill, but little is known about it. During the mid 14th century, the Prince-Bishop of Basel Johann II von Munsingen, granted Rondchâtel to his brother Conrad, who was an ecclesiastical bailiff of Biel in 1340–65. Starting at the end of the 14th century, Rondchâtel fief was owned by the de Nans and d'Orsans families out of Franche-Comté. They held the village until 1766, when the last heir of the families died out and the fief reverted to the Prince-Bishop. The Prince-Bishop then leased Rondchâtel to the community of Péry.

After the 1797 French victory and the Treaty of Campo Formio, Péry became part of the French Département of Mont-Terrible. A few years later, it became part of the Département of Haut-Rhin. After Napoleon's defeat and the Congress of Vienna, Péry was assigned to the Canton of Bern in 1815.

The village church of St. James was first mentioned in 884. After the village converted to the new Reformed faith in 1530, it became a Reformed church. The current church was built in 1706 around a core of an older, Gothic building. At some point it became the parish church for the parish of Péry. From 1798 until 1840, Vauffelin was part of the parish. A Roman Catholic chapel was built in the village in 1906.

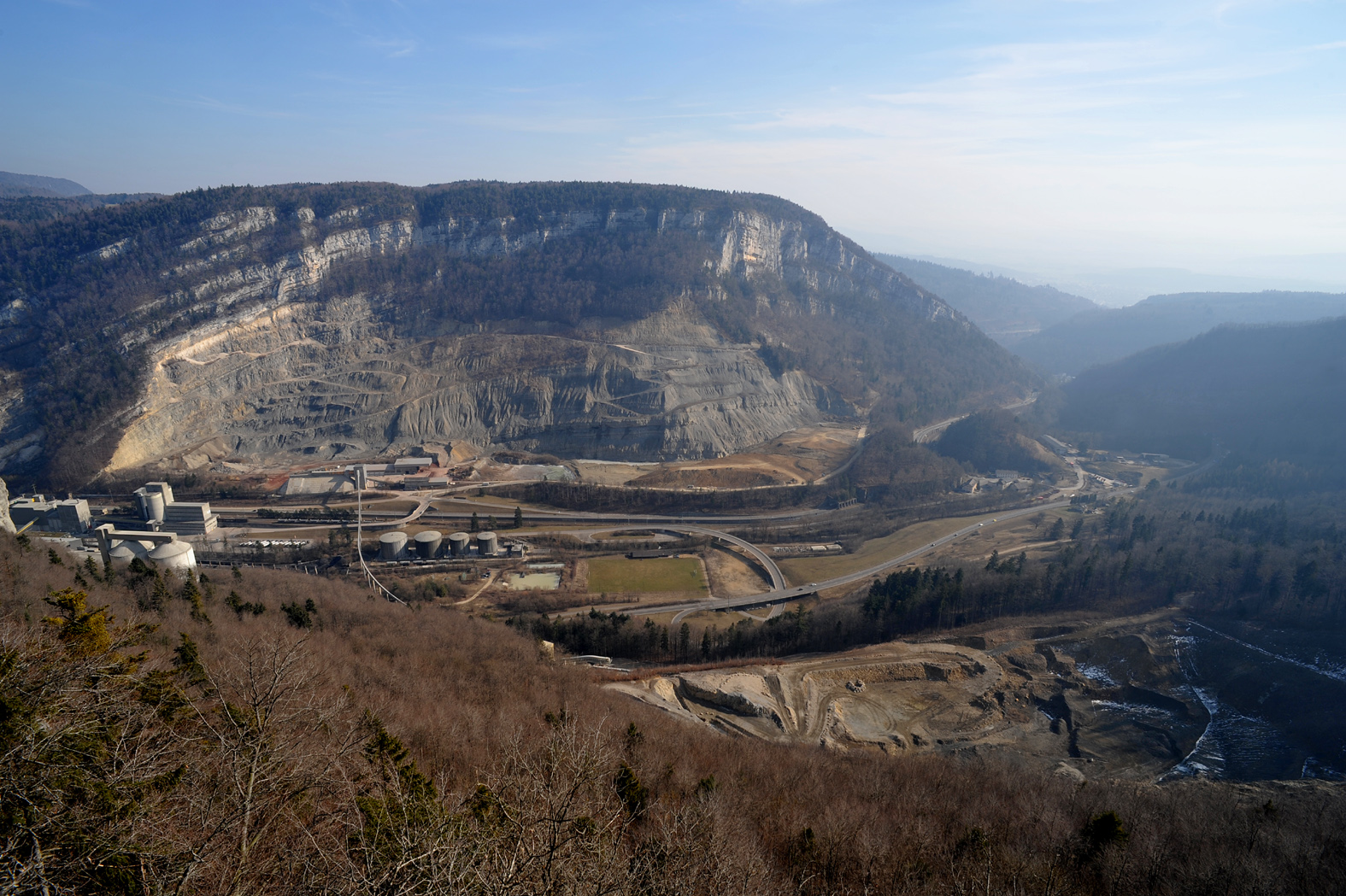
Rondchâtel cement factory and quarry

The Prince-Bishop of Basel, Johann Franz von Schönau-Zell (Bishop 1651-1656), had a blast furnace built at La Reuchenette in 1654. In 1693 he gave the furnace as a fief to Chemilleret family, who held it until the death of their last heir in 1756. By 1782 the site included an ironworks, a house, an inn. After the French invasion, it was declared a national treasure and the feudal ownership was abolished. The Société des forges d'Undervelier took over operation of the site until 1867, when it closed.

The Biel-Les Convers railway opened in 1874 and encouraged industrial and population growth. The lime and cement factory in Rondchâtel (1874), the wood pulp plant at Biberist (1882) and a branch of the Rondchâtel cement factory in La Reuchenette (today Ciments Vigier SA) all contributed to the prosperity of the municipality. The watch manufacturer Dreyfus Frères SA of Biel opened a branch company in 1903 in Péry. This company, called Péry Watch, did not survive the financial crisis of the 1930s. The building was converted in 1934 into a typewriter ribbon, stencils and carbon paper factory under the name Carfa SA. Carfa remained in operation until 2003. In 2005, just over half of all jobs in the municipality were in manufacturing.

On 1 January 2015 the former municipalities of Péry and La Heutte merged to form the new municipality of Péry-La Heutte.

== Geography ==
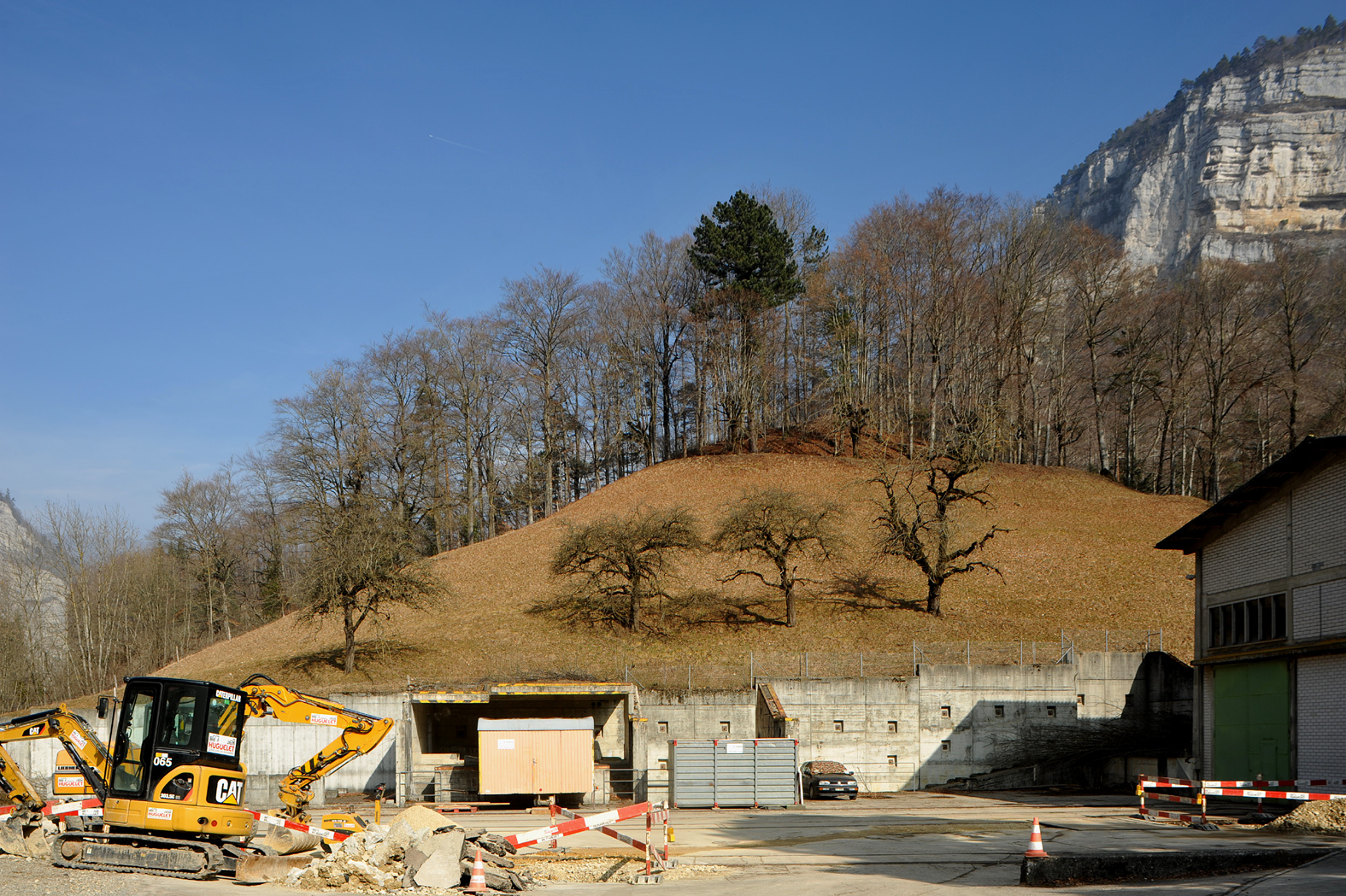
Rondchâtel, castle hill terrace at the southern side

Before the merger, Péry had a total area of 15.7 km^{2} (6.1 mi^{2}). Of this area, 3.6 km^{2} (1.4 mi^{2}) or 22.9% is used for agricultural purposes, while 10.5 km^{2} (4.1 mi^{2}) or 66.8% is forested. Of the rest of the land, 1.44 km^{2} (0.56 mi^{2}) or 9.2% is settled (buildings or roads), 0.07 km^{2} (17 acres) or 0.4% is either rivers or lakes and 0.1 km^{2} (25 acres) or 0.6% is unproductive land.

Of the built up area, industrial buildings made up 1.3% of the total area while housing and buildings made up 2.3% and transportation infrastructure made up 2.2%. Power and water infrastructure as well as other special developed areas made up 3.2% of the area Out of the forested land, 63.2% of the total land area is heavily forested and 3.6% is covered with orchards or small clusters of trees. Of the agricultural land, 3.1% is used for growing crops and 6.5% is pastures and 13.0% is used for alpine pastures. All the water in the municipality is flowing water.

It lies on the eastern end of the Saint-Imier valley and includes the villages of Rondchâtel and La Reuchenette.

On 31 December 2009 District de Courtelary, the municipality's former district, was dissolved. On the following day, 1 January 2010, it joined the newly created Arrondissement administratif Jura bernois.

== Coat of arms ==
The blazon of the municipal coat of arms is Gules a Guidon Argent staffed Or.

== Demographics ==
Péry had a population (as of 2013) of 1,359. As of 2010, 11.6% of the population are resident foreign nationals. Over the last 10 years (2000-2010) the population has changed at a rate of 2%. Migration accounted for 6.3%, while births and deaths accounted for -2.3%.

Most of the population (as of 2000) speaks French (1,063 or 79.6%) as their first language, German is the second most common (205 or 15.4%) and Italian is the third (30 or 2.2%). There are 4 people who speak Romansh.

As of 2008, the population was 50.3% male and 49.7% female. The population was made up of 601 Swiss men (44.3% of the population) and 81 (6.0%) non-Swiss men. There were 599 Swiss women (44.1%) and 76 (5.6%) non-Swiss women. Of the population in the municipality, 430 or about 32.2% were born in Péry and lived there in 2000. There were 447 or 33.5% who were born in the same canton, while 233 or 17.5% were born somewhere else in Switzerland, and 184 or 13.8% were born outside of Switzerland.

As of 2010, children and teenagers (0–19 years old) make up 21.5% of the population, while adults (20–64 years old) make up 59.2% and seniors (over 64 years old) make up 19.3%.

As of 2000, there were 494 people who were single and never married in the municipality. There were 669 married individuals, 95 widows or widowers and 77 individuals who are divorced.

As of 2000, there were 199 households that consist of only one person and 36 households with five or more people. In 2000, a total of 574 apartments (87.9% of the total) were permanently occupied, while 42 apartments (6.4%) were seasonally occupied and 37 apartments (5.7%) were empty. As of 2010, the construction rate of new housing units was 3.7 new units per 1000 residents. The vacancy rate for the municipality, in 2011, was 2.35%.

The historical population is given in the following chart:

== Sights ==
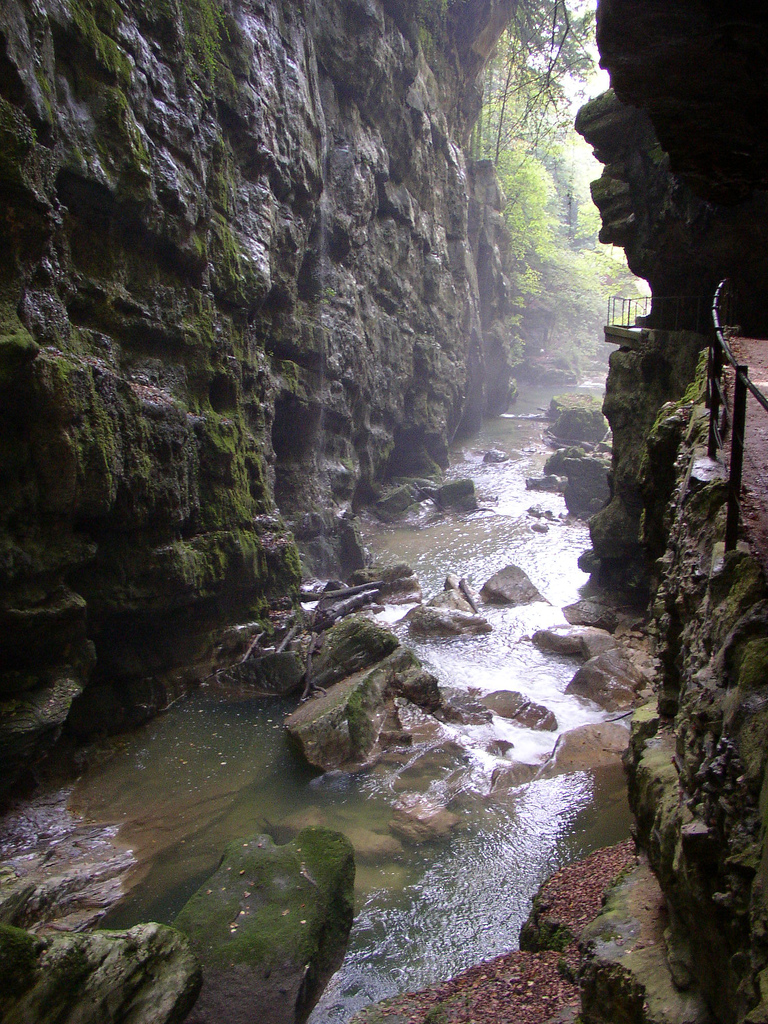
Taubenlochschlucht (Taubenloch Canyon)

The entire Taubenloch canyon is designated as part of the Inventory of Swiss Heritage Sites.

== Politics ==
In the 2011 federal election the most popular party was the Swiss People's Party (SVP) which received 35.2% of the vote. The next three most popular parties were the Social Democratic Party (SP) (25.5%), the Green Party (10.3%) and the FDP.The Liberals (9.4%). In the federal election, a total of 314 votes were cast, and the voter turnout was 32.2%.

== Economy ==
As of 2011, Péry had an unemployment rate of 1.71%. As of 2008, there were a total of 317 people employed in the municipality. Of these, there were 18 people employed in the primary economic sector and about 7 businesses involved in this sector. 180 people were employed in the secondary sector and there were 13 businesses in this sector. 119 people were employed in the tertiary sector, with 30 businesses in this sector.

In 2008 there were a total of 282 full-time equivalent jobs. The number of jobs in the primary sector was 12, all of which were in agriculture. The number of jobs in the secondary sector was 167 of which 138 or (82.6%) were in manufacturing and 8 (4.8%) were in construction. The number of jobs in the tertiary sector was 103. In the tertiary sector; 19 or 18.4% were in wholesale or retail sales or the repair of motor vehicles, 32 or 31.1% were in the movement and storage of goods, 12 or 11.7% were in a hotel or restaurant, 4 or 3.9% were technical professionals or scientists, 11 or 10.7% were in education and 4 or 3.9% were in health care.

In 2000, there were 226 workers who commuted into the municipality and 511 workers who commuted away. The municipality is a net exporter of workers, with about 2.3 workers leaving the municipality for every one entering. Of the working population, 19.2% used public transportation to get to work, and 61.7% used a private car.

== Religion ==
From the 2000 census, 318 or 23.8% were Roman Catholic, while 751 or 56.3% belonged to the Swiss Reformed Church. Of the rest of the population, there were 2 members of an Orthodox church (or about 0.15% of the population), there was 1 individual who belongs to the Christian Catholic Church, and there were 86 individuals (or about 6.44% of the population) who belonged to another Christian church. There was 1 individual who was Jewish, and 11 (or about 0.82% of the population) who were Islamic. There were 1 individual who belonged to another church. 146 (or about 10.94% of the population) belonged to no church, are agnostic or atheist, and 61 individuals (or about 4.57% of the population) did not answer the question.

== Education ==
In Péry about 537 or (40.2%) of the population have completed non-mandatory upper secondary education, and 108 or (8.1%) have completed additional higher education (either university or a Fachhochschule). Of the 108 who completed tertiary schooling, 69.4% were Swiss men, 23.1% were Swiss women, 7.4% were non-Swiss men.

The Canton of Bern school system provides one year of non-obligatory Kindergarten, followed by six years of Primary school. This is followed by three years of obligatory lower Secondary school where the students are separated according to ability and aptitude. Following the lower Secondary students may attend additional schooling or they may enter an apprenticeship.

During the 2010–11 school year, there were a total of 121 students attending classes in Péry. There were 2 kindergarten classes with a total of 24 students in the municipality. Of the kindergarten students, 8.3% were permanent or temporary residents of Switzerland (not citizens) and 12.5% have a different mother language than the classroom language. The municipality had 5 primary classes and 97 students. Of the primary students, 8.2% were permanent or temporary residents of Switzerland (not citizens) and 16.5% have a different mother language than the classroom language.

As of 2000, there were 14 students in Péry who came from another municipality, while 70 residents attended schools outside the municipality.

Péry is home to the Bibliothèque scolaire et communale de Péry library. The library has (as of 2008) 5,965 books or other media, and loaned out 6,443 items in the same year. It was open a total of 78 days with average of 4 hours per week during that year.
