= Romont, Bern =

Romont
- Municipality
- Flag Coat of arms
- Location of Romont
- Location within Switzerland Location within Canton of Bern
- Coordinates: 47°11′N 7°21′E
- Country: Switzerland
- Canton: Bern
- District: Jura bernois

Government
  - Mayor: Maire; Yvan Kohler (as of 2023)

Area
  - Total: 7.07 km^{2} (2.73 sq mi)
- Elevation: 907 m (2,976 ft)

Population (December 2020)
  - Total: 202
  - Density: 28.6/km^{2} (74.0/sq mi)
- Time zone: UTC+01:00 (CET)
  - Summer (DST): UTC+02:00 (CEST)
- Postal code: 2538
- SFOS number: 442
- ISO 3166 code: CH-BE
- Surrounded by: Court, Sorvilier, Péry, Plagne, Vauffelin, Pieterlen, Lengnau, Grenchen
- Website: www.romont-jb.ch

Romont (French pronunciation: [ʁɔmɔ̃]) is a municipality in the Jura bernois administrative district in the canton of Bern in Switzerland. It is located in the French-speaking Bernese Jura (Jura Bernois).

== History ==
Romont is first mentioned in 1311 as Redemont. The municipality was formerly known by its German name Rothmund, however, that name is no longer used.

The Basel Cathedral owned a fief in Romont, which they assigned to Bourkard de la Roche in 1311. During the 14th and 15th century the noble Romont family owned a castle situated between Romont and Vauffelin. During the Middle Ages, Romont was part of the seigniory of Erguel which was owned by the Prince Bishop of Basel. After the 1797 French victory and the Treaty of Campo Formio, Romont became part of the French Département of Mont-Terrible. Three years later, in 1800 it became part of the Département of Haut-Rhin. After Napoleon's defeat and the Congress of Vienna, Romont was assigned to the Canton of Bern in 1815.

In 1839, for geographic, language and historical reasons, Romont transferred from the Büren district and Pieterlen parish to the Courtelary district and Vauffelin parish. Beginning in 1971, the villages of Romont, Vauffelin and Frinvillier created a shared school district. Many of the residents in Romont commute to jobs in Biel/Bienne and other towns or work in agriculture in Romont.

== Geography ==
Romont has an area of 7.02 km^{2} (2.71 sq mi). Of this area, 2.66 km^{2} (1.03 mi^{2}) or 37.8% is used for agricultural purposes, while 4.1 km^{2} (1.6 mi^{2}) or 58.3% is forested. Of the rest of the land, 0.22 km^{2} (0.085 mi^{2}) or 3.1% is settled (buildings or roads), 0.01 km^{2} (2.5 acres) or 0.1% is either rivers or lakes and 0.01 km^{2} (2.5 acres) or 0.1% is unproductive land.

Of the built up area, housing and buildings made up 1.1% and transportation infrastructure made up 1.6%. Out of the forested land, 52.1% of the total land area is heavily forested and 6.3% is covered with orchards or small clusters of trees. Of the agricultural land, 8.0% is used for growing crops and 11.1% is pastures and 18.3% is used for alpine pastures. All the water in the municipality is in lakes.

The municipality is located on the first Jura ridge line above Pieterlen and the Aare valley.

On 31 December 2009 District de Courtelary, the municipality's former district, was dissolved. On the following day, 1 January 2010, it joined the newly created Arrondissement administratif Jura bernois.

== Coat of arms ==
The blazon of the municipal coat of arms is Gules a Tower embatteled Argent issuant from a Mount Vert and in a Chief of the second a Sparrow-Hawk displayed Azure.

== Demographics ==
Romont has a population (as of December 2020) of 202. As of 2010, 9.5% of the population are resident foreign nationals. Over the last 10 years (2000-2010) the population has changed at a rate of 4.7%. Migration accounted for 2.1%, while births and deaths accounted for 3.7%.

Most of the population (as of 2000) speaks French (104 or 52.8%) as their first language, German is the second most common (81 or 41.1%) and Italian is the third (5 or 2.5%).

As of 2008, the population was 48.7% male and 51.3% female. The population was made up of 89 Swiss men (44.7% of the population) and 8 (4.0%) non-Swiss men. There were 91 Swiss women (45.7%) and 11 (5.5%) non-Swiss women. Of the population in the municipality, 70 or about 35.5% were born in Romont and lived there in 2000. There were 52 or 26.4% who were born in the same canton, while 41 or 20.8% were born somewhere else in Switzerland, and 18 or 9.1% were born outside of Switzerland.

As of 2010, children and teenagers (0–19 years old) make up 21.1% of the population, while adults (20–64 years old) make up 60.3% and seniors (over 64 years old) make up 18.6%.

As of 2000, there were 68 people who were single and never married in the municipality. There were 114 married individuals, 10 widows or widowers and 5 individuals who are divorced.

As of 2000, there were 13 households that consist of only one person and 5 households with five or more people. In 2000, a total of 76 apartments (82.6% of the total) were permanently occupied, while 7 apartments (7.6%) were seasonally occupied and 9 apartments (9.8%) were empty. As of 2010, the construction rate of new housing units was 15.1 new units per 1000 residents. The vacancy rate for the municipality, in 2011, was 1.9%.

The historical population is given in the following chart:

== Politics ==
In the 2011 federal election the most popular party was the Swiss People's Party (SVP) which received 54.6% of the vote. The next three most popular parties were the Social Democratic Party (SP) (16.6%), the Green Party (9.6%) and the Conservative Democratic Party (BDP) (6.6%). In the federal election, a total of 55 votes were cast, and the voter turnout was 35.9%.

== Economy ==
As of 2011, Romont had an unemployment rate of 0.72%. As of 2008, there were a total of 37 people employed in the municipality. Of these, there were 24 people employed in the primary economic sector and about 8 businesses involved in this sector. 3 people were employed in the secondary sector and there was 1 business in this sector. 10 people were employed in the tertiary sector, with 5 businesses in this sector.

In 2008 there were a total of 28 full-time equivalent jobs. The number of jobs in the primary sector was 17, all in agriculture. The number of jobs in the secondary sector was 3, all in construction. The number of jobs in the tertiary sector was 8 of which 1 was in trade, sale or the repair of motor vehicles and 4 were in a hotel or restaurant.

In 2000, there were 14 workers who commuted into the municipality and 83 workers who commuted away. The municipality is a net exporter of workers, with about 5.9 workers leaving the municipality for every one entering. Of the working population, 6.1% used public transportation to get to work, and 71.9% used a private car.

== Religion ==
From the 2000 census, 35 or 17.8% were Roman Catholic, while 117 or 59.4% belonged to the Swiss Reformed Church. Of the rest of the population, there were 4 members of an Orthodox church (or about 2.03% of the population), and there were 4 individuals (or about 2.03% of the population) who belonged to another Christian church. 25 (or about 12.69% of the population) belonged to no church, are agnostic or atheist, and 14 individuals (or about 7.11% of the population) did not answer the question.

== Education ==
In Romont about 70 or (35.5%) of the population have completed non-mandatory upper secondary education, and 23 or (11.7%) have completed additional higher education (either university or a Fachhochschule). Of the 23 who completed tertiary schooling, 78.3% were Swiss men, 21.7% were Swiss women.

The Canton of Bern school system provides one year of non-obligatory Kindergarten, followed by six years of Primary school. This is followed by three years of obligatory lower Secondary school where the students are separated according to ability and aptitude. Following the lower Secondary students may attend additional schooling or they may enter an apprenticeship.

During the 2010-11 school year, there were a total of 13 students attending classes in Romont. There were no kindergarten classes and one primary class with 13 students in the municipality. Of the primary students, 30.8% were permanent or temporary residents of Switzerland (not citizens) and 53.8% have a different mother language than the classroom language.

As of 2000, there were 28 students in Romont who came from another municipality, while 18 residents attended schools outside the municipality.
