= Frinvillier-Taubenloch railway station =

Railway station in Sauge, Switzerland

Frinvillier-Taubenloch
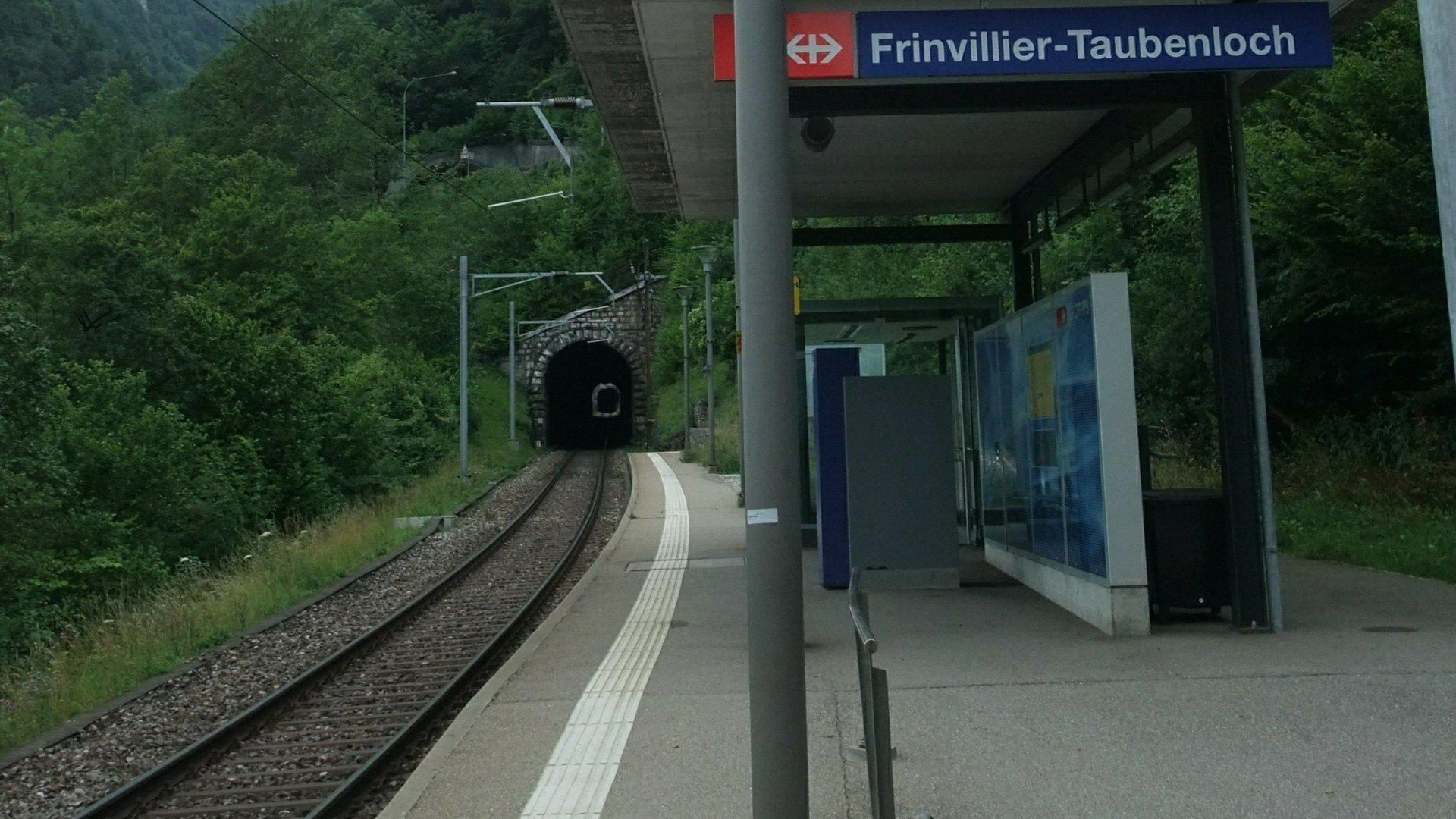
- The station in 2018

General information
- Location: Sauge; Switzerland
- Coordinates: 47°10′10″N 7°15′27″E
- Elevation: 555 m (1,821 ft)
- Owner: Swiss Federal Railways
- Line: Biel/Bienne–La Chaux-de-Fonds line
- Distance: 39.1 km (24.3 mi) from Bern
- Platforms: 1 side platform
- Tracks: 1
- Train operators: Swiss Federal Railways

Construction
- Parking: 0
- Accessible: Partly

Other information
- Station code: 8504301 (FRIN)
- Fare zone: 301 (Libero)

Passengers
- 2023: 220 per weekday (SBB)

Services
Preceding station	SBB CFF FFS	Following station
Reuchenette-Péry towards La Chaux-de-Fonds or Moutier	R41	Biel/Bienne Terminus
Location

Frinvillier-Taubenloch railway station (French: Gare de Frinvillier-Taubenloch) is a railway station in the municipality of Sauge, in the Swiss canton of Bern. It is an intermediate stop on the standard gauge Biel/Bienne–La Chaux-de-Fonds line of Swiss Federal Railways.

== Services ==
As of the December 2023 timetable change, the following services stop at Frinvillier-Taubenloch:

- Regio: hourly service between La Chaux-de-Fonds or Moutier and Biel/Bienne.
