= Orvin =

- Municipality
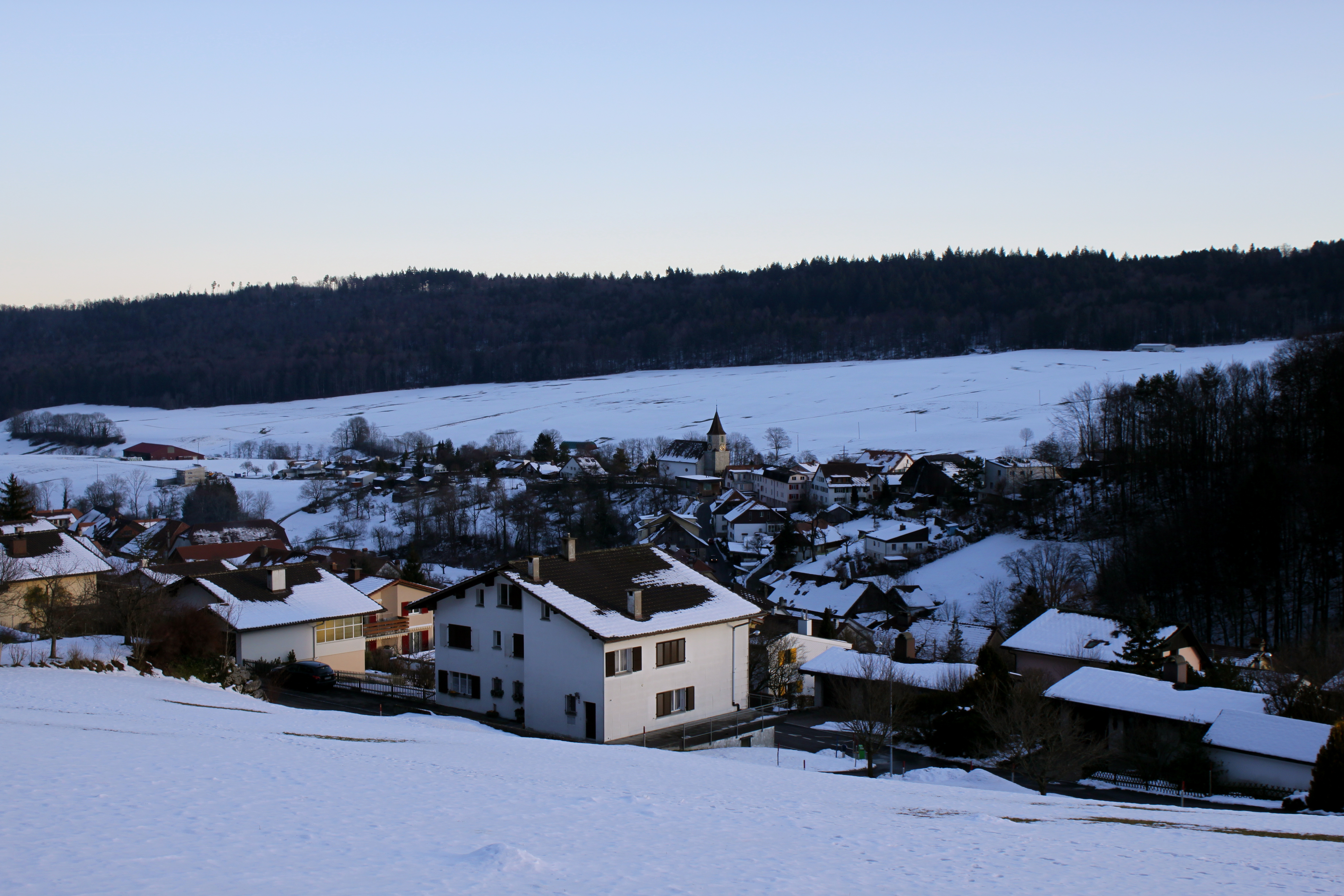
- Orvin village

- Flag Coat of arms
- Location of Orvin
- Location within Switzerland Location within Canton of Bern
- Coordinates: 47°10′N 7°13′E
- Country: Switzerland
- Canton: Bern
- District: Jura bernois

Government
  - Mayor: Maire; Patrik Devaux

Area
  - Total: 21.43 km^{2} (8.27 sq mi)
- Elevation: 669 m (2,195 ft)

Population (December 2020)
  - Total: 1,198
  - Density: 55.90/km^{2} (144.8/sq mi)
- Demonym: Orvinois
- Time zone: UTC+01:00 (CET)
  - Summer (DST): UTC+02:00 (CEST)
- Postal code: 2534
- SFOS number: 438
- ISO 3166 code: CH-BE
- Localities: Jorat, Les Prés-d'Orvin
- Surrounded by: Corgémont, Sonceboz-Sombeval, La Heutte, Péry, Vauffelin, Biel/Bienne, Evilard, Lamboing, Nods
- Website: orvin.ch

Orvin is a municipality in the Jura bernois administrative district in the canton of Bern in Switzerland. It is located in the French-speaking Bernese Jura (Jura Bernois). Above it, there is a small year round resort, called les "Prés-d'Orvin".

== History ==
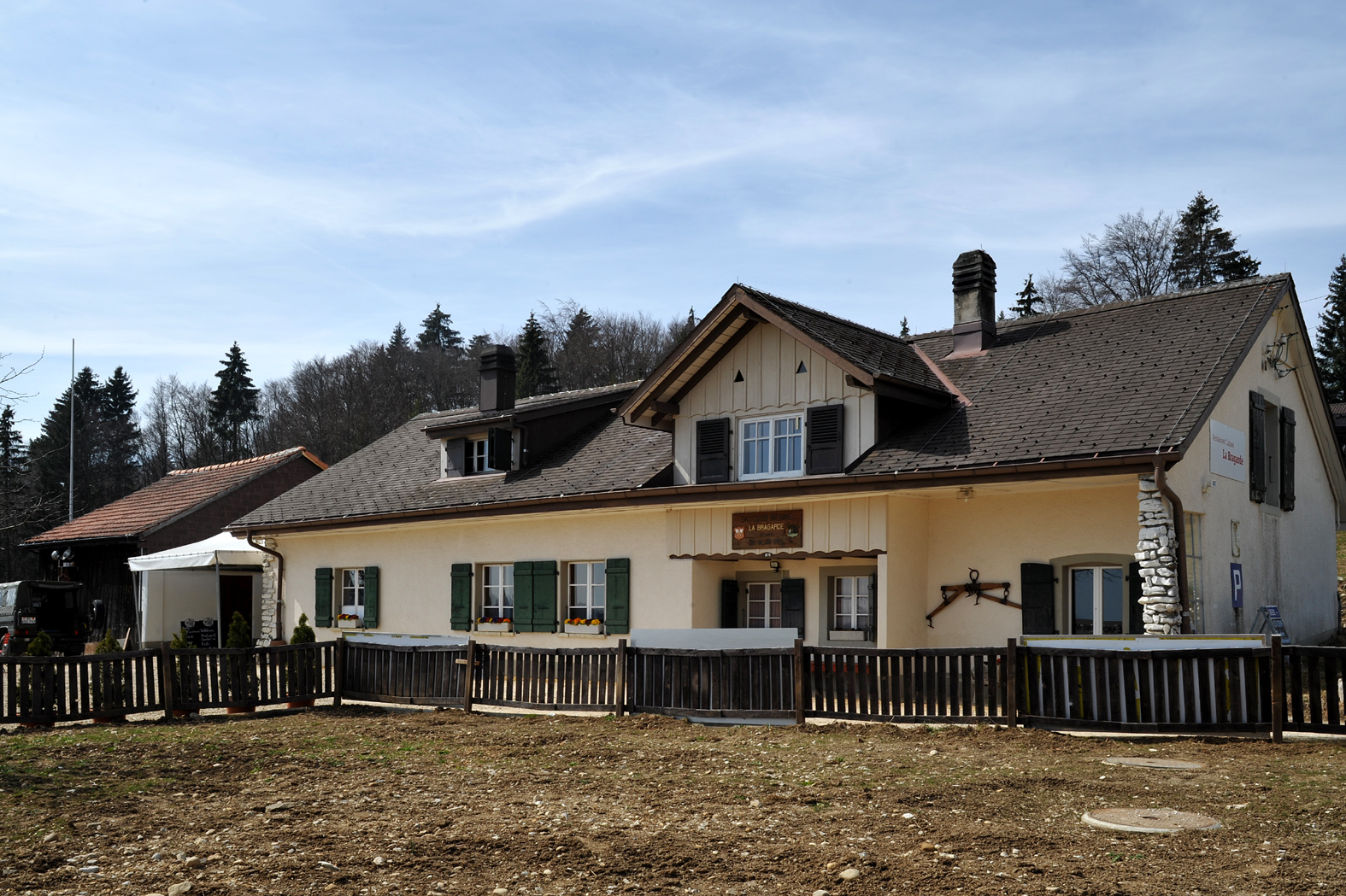
La Bragarde house in Les Prés-d'Orvin

Orvin is first mentioned in 866 as Ulvinc.

In 999 King Rudolph III of Burgundy gave Moutier-Grandval Abbey and its lands, including Orvin, to the Prince-Bishop of Basel. The village remained under the Bishop's direct control until 1295, when the Lords of Orvin received the village as a fief. They held the village until the end of the 14th century, after which it passed to the d'Orsans family and then the Lords of Rondchâtel. After the Rondchâtel line died out, the village returned to the Bishop's control who placed it under the ecclesiastical vogt of Biel. The first town charter of 1352 was expanded and revised in 1643 and confirmed by the Bishop in 1668. It remained in effect until the end of the Ancien Régime. Starting in the 14th century, the feudal levies of Orvin were part of a company from Erguel and under the control of Biel. However, between 1649 and 1852, they formed a separate company with its own banner. The military company became a major local corporation, which became quite wealthy through offering loans.

The old village church of St. Peter was part of the diocese of Lausanne, while the town was owned by the Bishop of Basel. St. Peter's was eventually demolished and a late-Gothic church was built in another location. That church was demolished in 1722 and replaced by the current Baroque church, which was decorated in 1916 by Paul Robert. The village accepted the Protestant Reformation in 1530. In the 17th century, the population was afflicted by several witch trials.

After the 1797 French victory and the Treaty of Campo Formio, Orvin became part of the French Département of Mont-Terrible. Three years later, in 1800 it became part of the Département of Haut-Rhin. After Napoleon's defeat and the Congress of Vienna, Orvin was assigned to the Canton of Bern.

During the late 19th century, the municipality remained isolated from the growing Swiss railroad network. It remained generally agrarian and in 1930 had 95 farms. However, in the 1950s the population began to grow as good roads were built into the village. In the following twenty years the population increased by nearly one-third. As the population grew, several factories opened in Orvin. In 1954 the first factory, the Schäublin factory, opened in the municipality. It was followed by a Bulova factory in 1964, the Léchot company in 1961, LNS company in 1973 and Precimed in 1988. By 2005 only 10% of the working population worked in agriculture, while almost two-thirds worked in industry. The resort village of Les Prés-d'Orvin grew rapidly as residents of Biel and Solothurn bought chalets. In 1951 there were 181 houses in Les Prés-d'Orvin, while in 1975 it had increased to 332.

== Geography ==
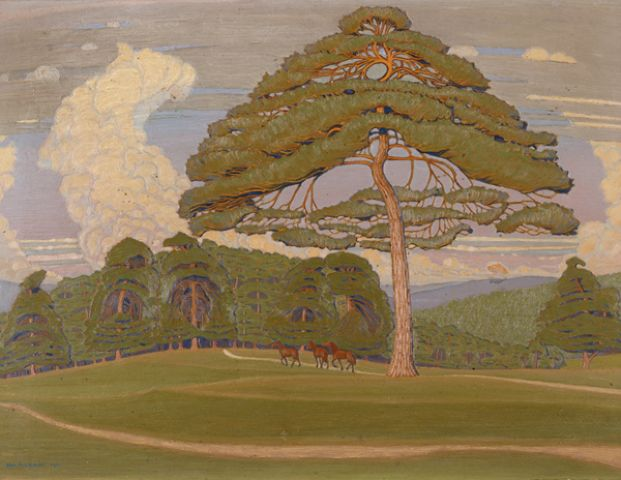
Painting of the Orvin valley, 1911

Orvin has an area of 21.59 km^{2} (8.34 sq mi). Of this area, 8.12 km^{2} (3.14 mi^{2}) or 37.6% is used for agricultural purposes, while 12.36 km^{2} (4.77 mi^{2}) or 57.2% is forested. Of the rest of the land, 1.04 km^{2} (0.40 mi^{2}) or 4.8% is settled (buildings or roads) and 0.12 km^{2} (30 acres) or 0.6% is unproductive land.

Of the built up area, housing and buildings made up 3.0% and transportation infrastructure made up 1.5%. Out of the forested land, 52.3% of the total land area is heavily forested and 5.0% is covered with orchards or small clusters of trees. Of the agricultural land, 7.3% is used for growing crops and 11.5% is pastures and 18.2% is used for alpine pastures.

It is located north of Biel/Bienne in a side valley of the Suze river.

On 31 December 2009 District de Courtelary, the municipality's former district, was dissolved. On the following day, 1 January 2010, it joined the newly created Arrondissement administratif Jura bernois.

== Coat of arms ==
The blazon of the municipal coat of arms is Or on a Base Vert a Peasant clead Gules with a spear Sable topped Argent fighting a Bear rampant Sable langued armed and viriled of the third.

== Demographics ==
Orvin has a population (as of December 2020) of 1,198. As of 2010, 9.1% of the population are resident foreign nationals. Over the last 10 years (2000-2010) the population has changed at a rate of -4%. Migration accounted for 3.5%, while births and deaths accounted for -1.4%.

Most of the population (as of 2000) speaks French (1,019 or 82.5%) as their first language, German is the second most common (175 or 14.2%) and Albanian is the third (15 or 1.2%). There are 6 people who speak Italian.

As of 2008, the population was 50.5% male and 49.5% female. The population was made up of 545 Swiss men (45.7% of the population) and 57 (4.8%) non-Swiss men. There were 539 Swiss women (45.2%) and 51 (4.3%) non-Swiss women. Of the population in the municipality, 463 or about 37.5% were born in Orvin and lived there in 2000. There were 384 or 31.1% who were born in the same canton, while 178 or 14.4% were born somewhere else in Switzerland, and 131 or 10.6% were born outside of Switzerland.

As of 2010, children and teenagers (0–19 years old) make up 21.7% of the population, while adults (20–64 years old) make up 58.2% and seniors (over 64 years old) make up 20.1%.

As of 2000, there were 479 people who were single and never married in the municipality. There were 593 married individuals, 101 widows or widowers and 62 individuals who are divorced.

As of 2000, there were 181 households that consist of only one person and 32 households with five or more people. In 2000, a total of 474 apartments (59.0% of the total) were permanently occupied, while 293 apartments (36.4%) were seasonally occupied and 37 apartments (4.6%) were empty. As of 2010, the construction rate of new housing units was 1.7 new units per 1000 residents. The vacancy rate for the municipality, in 2011, was 0.73%.

The historical population is given in the following chart:

== Sights ==
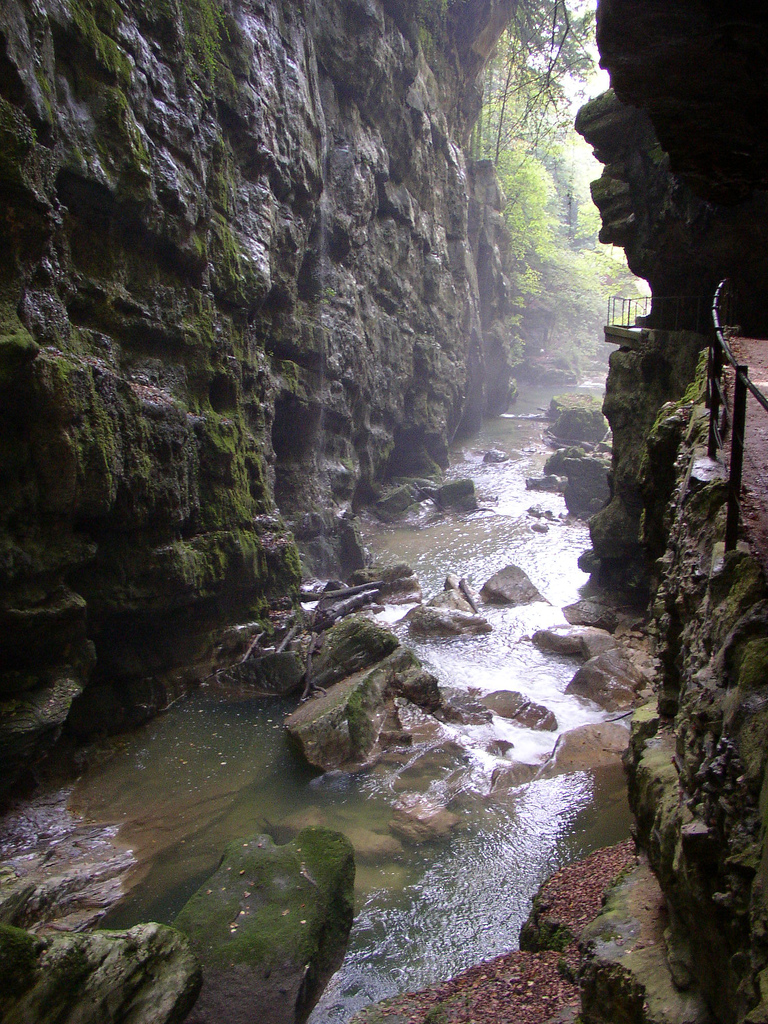
Taubenlochschlucht (Taubenloch Canyon)

The entire village of Orvin and the Taubenloch canyon are designated as part of the Inventory of Swiss Heritage Sites.

== Politics ==
In the 2011 federal election the most popular party was the Swiss People's Party (SVP) which received 35.9% of the vote. The next three most popular parties were the Social Democratic Party (SP) (24.1%), the Green Party (12.5%) and the FDP.The Liberals (7.5%). In the federal election, a total of 329 votes were cast, and the voter turnout was 36.7%.

== Economy ==
As of 2011, Orvin had an unemployment rate of 1.24%. As of 2008, there were a total of 557 people employed in the municipality. Of these, there were 48 people employed in the primary economic sector and about 22 businesses involved in this sector. 333 people were employed in the secondary sector and there were 19 businesses in this sector. 176 people were employed in the tertiary sector, with 30 businesses in this sector. There were 5 residents of the municipality who were employed in some capacity, of which females made up 0.0% of the workforce.

In 2008 there were a total of 481 full-time equivalent jobs. The number of jobs in the primary sector was 32, of which 31 were in agriculture and 1 was in forestry or lumber production. The number of jobs in the secondary sector was 319 of which 311 or (97.5%) were in manufacturing and 8 (2.5%) were in construction. The number of jobs in the tertiary sector was 130. In the tertiary sector; 11 or 8.5% were in wholesale or retail sales or the repair of motor vehicles, 3 or 2.3% were in the movement and storage of goods, 18 or 13.8% were in a hotel or restaurant, 8 or 6.2% were the insurance or financial industry, 4 or 3.1% were technical professionals or scientists, 11 or 8.5% were in education and 61 or 46.9% were in health care.

In 2000, there were 210 workers who commuted into the municipality and 336 workers who commuted away. The municipality is a net exporter of workers, with about 1.6 workers leaving the municipality for every one entering. About 2.4% of the workforce coming into Orvin are coming from outside Switzerland. Of the working population, 10.6% used public transportation to get to work, and 57.9% used a private car.

== Religion ==
From the 2000 census, 165 or 13.4% were Roman Catholic, while 773 or 62.6% belonged to the Swiss Reformed Church. Of the rest of the population, there were 3 members of an Orthodox church (or about 0.24% of the population), there were 2 individuals (or about 0.16% of the population) who belonged to the Christian Catholic Church, and there were 197 individuals (or about 15.95% of the population) who belonged to another Christian church. There were 15 (or about 1.21% of the population) who were Islamic. There were 2 individuals who were Hindu and 4 individuals who belonged to another church. 107 (or about 8.66% of the population) belonged to no church, are agnostic or atheist, and 65 individuals (or about 5.26% of the population) did not answer the question.

== Education ==
In Orvin about 448 or (36.3%) of the population have completed non-mandatory upper secondary education, and 117 or (9.5%) have completed additional higher education (either university or a Fachhochschule). Of the 117 who completed tertiary schooling, 65.8% were Swiss men, 23.9% were Swiss women, 8.5% were non-Swiss men.

The Canton of Bern school system provides one year of non-obligatory Kindergarten, followed by six years of Primary school. This is followed by three years of obligatory lower Secondary school where the students are separated according to ability and aptitude. Following the lower Secondary students may attend additional schooling or they may enter an apprenticeship.

During the 2010–11 school year, there were a total of 116 students attending classes in Orvin. There was one kindergarten class with a total of 23 students in the municipality. Of the kindergarten students, 8.7% were permanent or temporary residents of Switzerland (not citizens) and 4.3% have a different mother language than the classroom language. The municipality had 5 primary classes and 93 students. Of the primary students, 12.9% were permanent or temporary residents of Switzerland (not citizens) and 15.1% have a different mother language than the classroom language.

As of 2000, there were 27 students in Orvin who came from another municipality, while 80 residents attended schools outside the municipality.
