= Erguel =

Medieval seigniory in present day Switzerland

Erguel Erguël
- 1264-1797
- Flag Coat of arms
- Capital: Erguël
- Religion: Catholic
- Sire
  - 1264-?: Otto of Arguel
- History
  - Established: 1264-1797
  - Becomes Protectorate of Biel/Bienne: 1335
  - Merged into the French department of Mont-Terrible: 1797
  - Merged into the French department of Haut-Rhin: 1800
  - Part of Courtelary District, (BE) Switzerland: 1815

Erguël is a medieval seigniory of the Roman Catholic Diocese of Basel, and under protectorate of Biel/Bienne, under military jurisdiction from 1335, in the now called valley of St.-Imier, in the now Bernese Jura, Switzerland.

The Sire of the area used to live in the Château d'Erguel.

== History ==
In 1264, the Bishop of Basel appointed Otto of Erguel as the vogt over the Saint-Imier valley fief. Otto raised the valley to become a seigniory and parish of the Diocese of Basel, named Erguel.

== Asteroid ==
Asteroid 282669 Erguël, discovered by Swiss amateur astronomer Michel Ory at the Tenagra II Observatory in 2005, was named in memory of the seigniory. The official naming citation was published by the Minor Planet Center on 22 July 2013 (M.P.C. 84383).
