= Seignory =

Lordship granted over an estate

In English law, seignory or seigniory, spelled signiory in Early Modern English (/ˈseɪnjəri/; French: seigneur [sɛɲœʁ], lit. 'lord'; Latin: senior, lit. 'elder'), refers to the rights which a grantor retains after the grant of an estate in fee simple.

Nulle terre sans seigneur ("No land without a lord") was a feudal legal maxim; where no other lord can be discovered, the Crown is lord as lord paramount. The principal incidents of a seignory were a feudal oath of homage and fealty; a "quit" or "chief" rent; a "relief" of one year's quit rent, and the right of escheat. In return for these privileges, the lord was liable to forfeit his rights if he neglected to protect and defend the tenant or did anything injurious to the feudal relation.

Every seignory now existing must have been created before the statute Quia Emptores (1290), which forbade the future creation of estates in fee-simple by subinfeudation. The only seignories of any importance at present are the lordships of manors. They are regarded as incorporeal hereditaments, and are either appendant or in gross. A seignory appendant passes with the grant of the manor; a seignory in gross—that is, a seignory which has been severed from the demesne lands of the manor to which it was originally appendant—must be specially conveyed by deed of grant.

Freehold land may be enfranchised by a conveyance of the seignory to the freehold tenant, but it does not extinguish the tenant's right of common (Baring v. Abingdon, 1892, 2 Ch. 374). By s. 3 (ii.) of the Settled Land Act 1882, the tenant for life of a manor is empowered to sell the seignory of any freehold land within the manor, and by s. 21 (v.) the purchase of the seignory of any part of settled land being freehold land, is an authorized application of capital money arising under the act.

== See also ==
- Seigneurial system of New France
- Signoria
- Heerlijkheid
- Herrschaft
