= Mont-Terrible =

Department of Napoleonic France

Department of Mont-Terrible Département du Mont-Terrible (French)
- 1793–1800
- Mont-Terrible and its arrondissements
- Status: Department of the French First Republic
- Chef-lieu: Porrentruy; 47°25′N 7°5′E
- Official languages: French
- Common languages: Frainc-Comtou; French
- Historical era: French Revolutionary Wars
  - Prince-Bishopric of Basel overthrown: 19 December 1792
  - Annexation of the Rauracian Republic: 23 March 1793
  - Montbéliard incorporated: 1 March 1797
  - Treaty of Campo Formio: 18 October 1797
  - Incorporated to Haut-Rhin: 17 February 1800

Population
  - 1797 census: 35,954
Preceded by	Succeeded by
Prince-Bishopric of Basel; County of Montbéliard	Haut-Rhin
- Today part of: France; Switzerland

Mont-Terrible (French: [mɔ̃ tɛ.ʁibl]) was a department of the First French Republic, with its seat at Porrentruy.

The Mont Terrible for which the department was named is now known as Mont Terri, a peak of 804 metres (2,638 ft) near Courgenay (now in the canton of Jura, Switzerland). The toponym of Mont Terrible was formed by popular etymology from an earlier Frainc-Comtou Mont Tairi, from tari "arid, dry".

The department was created in 1793 with the annexation of the short-lived Rauracian Republic, which had been created in December 1792 from the imperial part of the Prince-Bishopric of Basel.

In 1797, the former House of Württemberg-owned Principality of Montbéliard, which had previously been given to Haute-Saône, was reattached to Mont-Terrible, together with the remaining Swiss part of the Bishopric of Basel after the French attack to the Elvetic nation.

The department was abolished in 1800. Its territory was annexed to the Haut-Rhin, within which it formed the two arrondissements of Delémont and Porrentruy.

In 1815, the territory that had previously formed Mont-Terrible was partitioned between Doubs (Montbéliard) and the Swiss canton of Bern (now forming the canton of Jura and the Bernese Jura).

== Creation ==
The department was created on 23 March 1793 by the National Convention, which decreed the French Republic and the Country of Porrentruy to be reunited under the name of the Department of Mont-Terrible.

First article — The Country of Porrentruy will form a special department, under the name of Department of Mont-Terrible.
Second article — The commissioners of the National Convention, sent in this country by decree of 10 February, are responsible for taking all necessary measures to ensure the enforcement of the laws of the Republic, and to forward to the Convention all information necessary to determine the organisation and division of this department.
Third article —The Provisional Executive Council is responsible for reducing [customs] barriers, taking all necessary precautions to prevent exports in contravention of the laws of the Republic.
