= List of Swiss people by net worth =

This is a list of Swiss billionaires based on an annual assessment of wealth and assets compiled and published by Forbes magazine in 2023.

== 2023 Swiss billionaires list ==
World Rank	Name	Citizenship	Net worth (USD)	Source of wealth
43	Gianluigi Aponte	Switzerland; Italy	31.2 billion	MSC
43	Rafaela Aponte-Diamant	Switzerland; Israel	31.2 billion	MSC
204	Ernesto Bertarelli	Switzerland; Italy	9.4 billion	Serono, investments
215	Ivan Glasenberg	Switzerland; Australia; South Africa	9 billion	Glencore
317	Guillaume Pousaz	Switzerland	7.2 billion	Checkout.com
365	Magdalena Martullo-Blocher	Switzerland	7.1 billion	Ems-Chemie
383	Rahel Blocher	Switzerland	6.6 billion	Ems-Chemie
445	Thomas Schmidheiny	Switzerland	5.7 billion	Holcim
486	Michael Pieper	Switzerland	5.4 billion	Franke
523	Hansjoerg Wyss	Switzerland	5.1 billion	Synthes
534	Dona Bertarelli	Switzerland	5 billion	Serono
534	Martin Haefner	Switzerland	5 billion	CA Technologies, Schmolz + Bickenbach
534	Thomas Straumann	Switzerland	5 billion	Straumann
552	Rudolf Maag	Switzerland	4.9 billion	medical devices
624	Peter Grogg	Switzerland	4.4 billion	Bachem Holding
679	Peter Spuhler	Switzerland	4.1 billion	Stadler Rail
818	Margarita Louis-Dreyfus	Switzerland	3.5 billion	Louis Dreyfus Company
852	Markus Blocher	Switzerland	3.4 billion	Ems-Chemie, ES Holding
852	Hans Peter Wild	Switzerland	3.4 billion	Wild Flavors
878	Walter Frey	Switzerland	3.3 billion	Emil Frey Group
949	Martin Ebner	Switzerland	3.1 billion	BZ Bank
982	Eva Maria Bucher-Haefner	Switzerland	3 billion	CA Technologies
982	Maja Oeri	Switzerland	3 billion	Roche
1164	Miriam Baumann-Blocher	Switzerland	2.6 billion	Ems-Chemie
1164	Sergio Mantegazza	Switzerland; Italy	2.6 billion	Group Voyagers (Globus family of brands)
1217	Willy Michel	Switzerland	2.5 billion	Ypsomed Selfcare Solutions
1272	Marcel Erni	Switzerland	2.4 billion	Partners Group
1272	Alfred Gantner	Switzerland	2.4 billion	Partners Group
1272	Matthias Reinhart	Switzerland	2.4 billion	VZ Holding
1272	Urs Wietlisbach	Switzerland	2.9 billion	Partners Group
1312	Stephan Schmidheiny	Switzerland	2.3 billion	investments
1312	Alberto Siccardi	Switzerland	2.3 billion	Medacta
1312	Georg von Opel	Switzerland	2.3 billion	Hansa AG
1368	Karl-Friedrich Scheufele	Switzerland; Germany	2.2 billion	Chopard
1434	Beda Diethelm	Switzerland	2.1 billion	Sonova
1516	Mario Germano Giuliani	Switzerland	2 billion	Royalty Pharma
1804	Gary Fegel	Switzerland	1.6 billion	commodities trading
1804	Giammaria Giuliani	Switzerland	1.6 billion	Royalty Pharma
1905	Esther Grether	Switzerland	1.5 billion	art collection, Swatch
2020	JJ Leomi	Switzerland	1.4 billion	Etherium Hack and s&p
2405	Stephane Bonvin	Switzerland	1.1 billion	Investis

== See also ==
- The World's Billionaires
- List of countries by the number of billionaires
