= Allianz Kompass Europa =

Swiss political organization

The Kompass Europa Alliance is a Swiss political organization that opposes the planned agreements on the further development of bilateral treaties between Switzerland and the European Union (EU) on their current basis. In particular, it rejects Switzerland's integration into the institutional conditions proposed by the EU. The alliance proposes alternative directions for Switzerland's foreign policy. It is supported by prominent figures from industry, finance, and consulting.

== Arguments Against Further Development of Bilateral Treaties with Dynamic Legal Adoption ==
In 2021, Kompass Europa articulated its objections to the then-negotiated framework agreement between Switzerland and the EU, publishing a corresponding manifesto.

Since 2022, the Swiss Federal Council has been negotiating with the EU on the further development of bilateral treaties. The new negotiating positions were formalized as a package solution. The Kompass Europa Alliance conducted an assessment and concluded that Switzerland is fundamentally politically and structurally incompatible with the EU. It argues that Switzerland's rights as a sovereign EU partner would be undermined. The alliance warns that dynamic legal adoption would lead to a downward leveling of the Swiss economy. It has critically analyzed and clarified the individual treaty components. The benefits of free movement of persons are controversially assessed. Heinrich Fischer, president of the alliance, argues that the EU has a greater interest in the free movement agreement than Switzerland. Alfred Gantner, a co-founder, opposes unrestricted access to the Swiss labor market through free movement, advocating for Switzerland to independently select desired workers, stating: "We can recruit in the EU at any time."

== Swiss Popular Initiative ==
On October 1, 2024, a committee closely associated with the alliance began collecting signatures for the federal popular initiative titled For a Direct-Democratic and Competitive Switzerland – No EU Passive Membership (Kompass Initiative). The initiative committee comprises 27 individuals, including one member of the National Council (Diana Gutjahr, SVP), one member of the Council of States (Hans Wicki, FDP.Liberals), entrepreneurs Daniel Aegerter, Alfred Gantner, Urs Lehmann, and Jörg Wolle, the editor-in-chief of Nebelspalter, Markus Somm, former TV presenter Kurt Aeschbacher, and former ski racer Bernhard Russi. The initiative's founders include those of the Partners Group. Unlike initiatives driven by political parties, established associations, NGOs, or professional political activists, this initiative stems from new economic and public groupings.

The initiative demands that future international treaties involving significant legal adoption be subject to a mandatory referendum. According to a Neue Zürcher Zeitung editor, the Swiss Federal Council could hardly ignore an initiative with over 100,000 valid signatures, likely requiring an institutional EU agreement to also face a cantonal majority. If accepted with a delay, a treaty previously approved by a simple popular majority under a facultative referendum would require an additional vote due to a retroactivity clause.

On June 17, 2012, the federal popular initiative "For strengthening people's rights in foreign policy (state treaties to the people!)" with a similar aim was rejected by 75.3% of voters and 23:0 cantonal votes. However, that initiative would have subjected state treaties to broader new rules compared to the current, narrowly focused proposal. Existing treaties like the Schengen/Dublin agreements would not be affected under the proposed transitional provisions.

== Statements ==
The Autonomiesuisse association, with 900 members, supports the initiative. Economic historian Thomas Straubhaar sees a political realignment in the business sector, arguing that this opposition cannot be dismissed as fringe. Jean-Daniel Gerber describes Kompass Europa as a turning point in the business community's approach. Conversely, on September 5, 2024, the board of Economiesuisse, representing a hundred industries, twenty chambers of commerce, and a dozen major companies, decided by a three-quarter majority to intensify its campaign for the further development of bilateral treaties with the EU. The Zurich Chamber of Commerce and Swissmem, the Swiss mechanical, electrical, and metal industry association, have also opposed the initiative. According to Elisabeth Schneider-Schneiter, president of the Basel Chamber of Commerce, the activities of Kompass Europa and Autonomiesuisse do not represent a division in the business community but rather "an isolated group of businesspeople."

== Alternative Objectives ==
The Kompass Europa Alliance advocates for an open and proactive Swiss foreign economic policy without a one-sided focus on the EU internal market. Relations with the EU should be regulated respectfully on equal terms. Additionally, the Confederation should respect the cantons' autonomy in implementing foreign economic policy.

== Steering Committee ==
The steering committee is chaired by Heinrich Fischer, former chairman of the board of the Hilti Group, board member of other Swiss companies, and former CEO of Adolph Saurer AG, Arbon. The committee comprises 22 members, predominantly entrepreneurs.
