= Scheufele =

Scheufele is a surname. Notable people with the surname include:

- Caroline Scheufele (born 1961), German businesswoman
- Dietram Scheufele, German-American social scientist
- Ernst Scheufele (died 2010), World War II Luftwaffe fighter ace
- Karl-Friedrich Scheufele (born 1958), Swiss businessman
