= 2026 Legends of Le Mans Series =

1st season of the Legends of Le Mans Series

The 2026 Legends of Le Mans Series was the first season of the Legends of Le Mans Series, organized by Peter Auto in partnership with Automobile Club de l’Ouest, and Le Mans Endurance Management. The season began at Imola Circuit on 17 April, and concluded at Monza Circuit on 7 November.

== Calendar 2026 ==
Round	Circuit	Date	Supporting
1	Imola Circuit, Imola, Italy	17–19 April	FIA World Endurance Championship
2	Circuit de Spa-Francorchamps, Stavelot, Belgium	7–9 May	FIA World Endurance Championship
3	Circuit de la Sarthe, Le Mans, France	2–5 July	Le Mans Classic
4	Monza Circuit, Monza, Italy	6–7 November	FIA World Endurance Championship

== Calendar 2027 ==
Round	Circuit	Date	Supporting
1	Imola Circuit, Imola, Italy	09-11 April	FIA World Endurance Championship
2	Circuit de Spa-Francorchamps, Stavelot, Belgium	13-15 May	FIA World Endurance Championship
3	Circuit de la Sarthe, Le Mans, France	10-13 June	24 hours of Le Mans
4	Bahrain International Circuit, Bahrain	04-06 Nov	FIA World Endurance Championship

== Entry list 2026 ==
=== LMP1 ===
Team	Car	Engine	No.	Drivers	Rounds
(United Kingdom) Front Row Racing	Aston Martin DBR1-2	Aston Martin AM04 6.0 L V12	007	(Belgium) Christophe d'Ansembourg	3
(United Kingdom) Front Row Racing	Aston Martin DBR1-2	Aston Martin AM04 6.0 L V12	008	(Germany) Christian Albrecht	1, 3
(United Kingdom) Front Row Racing	Aston Martin DBR1-2	Aston Martin AM04 6.0 L V12	009	(Hong Kong) Philip Kadoorie	3
(United Kingdom) BBM Sport	Peugeot 908 HDi FAP	Peugeot HDi FAP 5.5 L Turbo V12	4	(United Kingdom) Shaun Lynn	1–3
(United Kingdom) BBM Sport	Peugeot 908 HDi FAP	Peugeot HDi FAP 5.5 L Turbo V12	8	(Greece) Kriton Lendoudis	1–2
(United Kingdom) BBM Sport with Richard Bradley Motorsport	Peugeot 908	Peugeot HDi 3.7 L Turbo V8	6	(United Kingdom) Stuart Wiltshire	1–3
(Switzerland) FREY Group	Lola B07/18	Judd GV5.5 S2 5.5 L V10	5	(Switzerland) Michel Frey	1–3
(Switzerland) FREY Group / Race Performance AG	Lola B06/10	AER P32T 3.6 L Turbo V8	37	(Switzerland) Marcel Aebi	1–3
(United Kingdom) OC Racing	Peugeot 908	Peugeot HDi 3.7 L Turbo V8	16	(United Kingdom) Steve Brooks	1, 3
(Belgium) Motorsport98	Pescarolo 01	Judd DB 3.4 L V8	98	(Belgium) Eric de Doncker	1–2

=== LMP2 ===
Team	Car	Engine	No.	Drivers	Rounds
(Germany) Rinaldi Racing - Pierre Kaffer	Ligier JS P2	Nissan VK45DE 4.5 L V8	18	(Austria) Michael Doppelmayr	1–2
(Germany) Rinaldi Racing - Pierre Kaffer	Ligier JS P2	Nissan VK45DE 4.5 L V8	18	(Belgium) Werner d'Ansembourg	3
(Germany) Rinaldi Racing	Ligier JS P2	Nissan VK45DE 4.5 L V8	26	(France) Jacques Nicolet	1, 3
(Germany) Rinaldi Racing	Ligier JS P2	Nissan VK45DE 4.5 L V8	35	(Germany) Pierre Ehret	1–3
(Germany) Rinaldi Racing	Ligier JS P2	Nissan VK45DE 4.5 L V8	36	(France) Pierre-Olivier Calendini	3
(France) JMB Classic	Pescarolo 01	Judd GV5.5 S2 5.5 L V10	21	(France) Matthieu Lahaye	1
(France) JMB Classic	Pescarolo 01	Judd GV5.5 S2 5.5 L V10	21	(France) Jean-Baptiste Lahaye	2
(France) JMB Classic	Pescarolo 01	Judd GV5.5 S2 5.5 L V10	21	(France) François Hériau	3
(France) JMB Classic	Porsche RS Spyder	Porsche MR6 3.4 L V8	83	(France) François Perrodo	1–2
(France) IDEC Sport	Ligier JS P2	Nissan VK45DE 4.5 L V8	28	(Belgium) Alexandre Leroy	2–3
(United Kingdom) BBM Sport	Lola B11/83	Judd HK 3.4 L V8	33	(United Kingdom) Nick Adcock	1
(United Kingdom) BBM Sport	Lola B11/83	Judd HK 3.4 L V8	33	(United Kingdom) Alfie Briggs	2
(United Kingdom) BBM Sport	Lola B11/83	Judd HK 3.4 L V8	33	(United Kingdom) Michael Benham	3
(United Kingdom) WA Motorsport	HPD ARX-04b	Honda HR28TT 2.8 L Turbo V6	39	(United Kingdom) Mark Drain	1–3
(United Kingdom) Greaves Motorsport	Gibson 015S	Nissan VK45DE 4.5 L V8	41	(United States) David Cheng	2–3
(United Kingdom) Front Row Racing	Oreca 05	Nissan VK45DE 4.5 L V8	46	(Cyprus) Evgeny Kireev	1–3
(United Kingdom) JW Racing	Morgan LMP2	Nissan VK45DE 4.5 L V8	47	(United Kingdom) Andy Cummings	1–3

=== GTE ===
Team	Car	Engine	No.	Drivers	Rounds
(Germany) Komo-Tec	Lotus Evora GTE	Toyota 2GR-FE 3.5 L V6	13	(Germany) Wolfgang Henseler	1–3
(France) Fanta Racing Legend by Code Classic	Aston Martin Vantage AMR	Aston Martin M177 4.0 L Turbo V8	25	(Germany) Franz Wunderlich	1–3
(Italy) AF Corse	Ferrari 488 GTE Evo	Ferrari F154CB 3.9 L Turbo V8	100	(Austria) Stephan Joebstl	3

== Race results 2026 ==
Round		Circuit	LMP1 winners	LMP2 winners	GTE winners
1	R1	Imola Circuit	(United Kingdom) No. 008 Front Row Racing	(France) No. 83 JMB Classic	(France) No. 25 Fanta Racing Legend by Code Classic
1	R1	Imola Circuit	(Germany) Christian Albrecht	(France) François Perrodo	(Germany) Franz Wunderlich
1	R2	Imola Circuit	(United Kingdom) No. 008 Front Row Racing	(France) No. 83 JMB Classic	(France) No. 25 Fanta Racing Legend by Code Classic
1	R2	Imola Circuit	(Germany) Christian Albrecht	(France) François Perrodo	(Germany) Franz Wunderlich
2	R1	Circuit de Spa-Francorchamps	(United Kingdom) No. 8 BBM Sport	(France) No. 83 JMB Classic	(France) No. 25 Fanta Racing Legend by Code Classic
2	R1	Circuit de Spa-Francorchamps	(Greece) Kriton Lendoudis	(France) François Perrodo	(Germany) Franz Wunderlich
2	R2	Circuit de Spa-Francorchamps	(United Kingdom) No. 8 BBM Sport	(France) No. 83 JMB Classic	(France) No. 25 Fanta Racing Legend by Code Classic
2	R2	Circuit de Spa-Francorchamps	(Greece) Kriton Lendoudis	(France) François Perrodo	(Germany) Franz Wunderlich
3	R1	Circuit de la Sarthe	(United Kingdom) No. 008 Front Row Racing	(France) No. 28 IDEC Sport	(Italy) No. 100 AF Corse
3	R1	Circuit de la Sarthe	(Germany) Christian Albrecht	(Belgium) Alexandre Leroy	(Austria) Stephan Joebstl
3	R2	Circuit de la Sarthe	(United Kingdom) No. 009 Front Row Racing	(France) No. 21 JMB Classic	(Italy) No. 100 AF Corse
3	R2	Circuit de la Sarthe	(Hong Kong) Philip Kadoorie	(France) François Hériau	(Austria) Stephan Joebstl
3	R3	Circuit de la Sarthe	(United Kingdom) No. 008 Front Row Racing	(United Kingdom) No. 46 Front Row Racing	(Italy) No. 100 AF Corse
3	R3	Circuit de la Sarthe	(Germany) Christian Albrecht	(Cyprus) Evgeny Kireev	(Austria) Stephan Joebstl
4	R1	Monza Circuit	(United Kingdom) No. 8 BBM Sport	(France) No. 83 JMB Classic	(Austria) Proton Competiton
4	R1	Monza Circuit	(Greece) Kriton Lendoudis	(France) François Perrodo	(Austria) Horst FELBERMAYR
4	R2	Monza Circuit	(United Kingdom) No. 008 Front Row Racing	(France) No. 83 JMB Classic	(Austria) Proton Competiton
4	R2	Monza Circuit	(Germany) Christian Albrecht	(France) François Perrodo	(Austria) Horst FELBERMAYR

== See also ==
- 2026 FIA World Endurance Championship
