= Urs Wietlisbach =

Swiss ice hockey player

- Born: Urs Berthold Wietlisbach; 25 August 1961 (age 64)
- Occupation: Investor
- Known for: Co-founder of Partners Group

Urs Wietlisbach (born 25 August 1961) is a Swiss investor and businessman. He is a co-founder of Partners Group, one of the largest private equity funds in Europe.

== Education ==
Wietlisbach was educated at the University of St. Gallen, where he received a master's degree in business administration.

== Career ==
Following his graduation Wietlisbach worked at Credit Suisse, before he became a broker at Goldman Sachs. While at Goldman he established the firm's sales department in Switzerland and also met Alfred Gantner and Marcel Erni. Together the three of them co-founded Partners Group in 1996.

In 2015, Wietlisbach co-founded Blue Earth Capital, a global impact investment firm. Blue Earth's investment focus is environmental and social challenges. It is fully owned by Blue Earth Foundation, a Switzerland-based NGO focused on philanthropic activities. Wietlisbach serves as Chairman of both. During the same year, he was appointed as a member of the University of St. Gallen's HSG Advisory Board. In 2016, he became a member of the board of trustees of the HSG Foundation. As of 2023, he remains on both boards. In 2020, Wietlisbach reduced his shareholding in Partners Group to 5.01%.

Wietlisbach and the other co-founders of Partners Group established the Allianz Kompass Europa in 2020. It was created as a network of business leaders who oppose the proposed EU-Switzerland framework agreement on trade. The network proposed rejecting the framework, instead opting to continue with the current arrangement with the European Union. In May 2021, the Swiss government ended talks with the EU following public pressure in Switzerland. In 2021, The Ursimone Wietlisbach Foundation was also a major benefactor to the University of St. Gallen for the construction of its new SQUARE building.

In recent years, Wietlisbach has frequently spoken about the importance of investing in companies which focus on important future trends, such as decarbonisation and automation. Both Partners Group and Blue Earth include these markets in their investment strategies, with PG investing in companies such as Climeworks. In April 2022, Blue Earth was the lead investor in Sense's Series C funding round. Sense specialises in monitoring energy consumption in a home. Blue Earth has also invested in vertical farming startup, 80 Arces Farms. In May 2022, Wietlisbach announced that he was acquiring the 5-star Swiss hotel, Arosa Kulm. He is also a member of the board of directors of the Swiss asset manager Entrepreneur Partners.

He currently serves as the President of Sporthilfe and the “Passion Schneesport” Foundation. His background in both Foundations means Wietlisbach also plays an active role in supporting promising young athletes.

== Personal life ==
Wietlisbach featured on the 2021 Swiss billionaires list, and has also featured on similar rich lists focused on private equity.

He and his wife signed up to The Giving Pledge in 2022, committing the majority of their collective wealth to philanthropy. Part of this commitment is via the non-profit, The Ursimone Wietlisbach Foundation.
