= Martin Ebner =

Swiss businessman

- Born: 12 August 1945 (age 81)
- Education: University of Zurich; University of Florida
- Occupation: Businessman
- Known for: Founder, BZ Bank and BZ Group
- Spouse: Rosemarie Ebner

Martin Ebner (born 12 August 1945) is a Swiss billionaire, businessman and investor. He is the founder of BZ Bank and the investment firm, BZ Group. Through his investment vehicle Patinex, he owns multimillion-dollar stakes in various companies; his biggest holdings include Vifor Pharma, Temenos AG, and Intershop. As of 2026, Forbes estimates his net worth at $4.8 billion.

== Early life and education ==
Ebner grew up in Hurden near Pfäffikon SZ. He studied law at the University of Zurich, Switzerland, graduating magna cum laude as lic.iur. and earned a PhD in business administration from the University of Florida.

== Career ==
Before founding BZ Bank in 1985, and the investment firm, BZ Group in 1988, Ebner worked for Credit Suisse, and the private bank Vontobel, where he was a member of the executive board.

He is a major shareholder of Helvetic Airways, a Swiss low cost airline. In 2018, Ebner has signed a 600 million francs deal with Brazilian aircraft maker Embraer for delivery of 12 new aircraft.

=== Rise ===
In 1988, Ebner founded BZ Gruppe Holding Aktiengesellschaft. In addition to BZ Bank, their holdings included BZ Trust Aktiengesellschaft, an asset management company, as well as controlling interests in four investment companies founded by Ebner and traded on the stock exchange (BK Vision, Pharma Vision, Stillhalter Vision, Spezialitäten Vision). In the press, they were occasionally referred to as Ebner's "Visions", after the common component of their names. In addition, over the course of time, Ebner acquired significant stakes in various public and private companies, including Alusuisse and Lonza Group, Asea Brown Boveri, Credit Suisse Group, Roche Holding, Union Bank of Switzerland, Winterthur Group, as well as Intershop Holding. Ebner was a long-term investor.

Ebner focused on equities as the most promising long-term investment category. He also tried to influence the management of the companies in which he invested and on some of whose supervisory boards he sat, in the spirit of shareholder value. He also called for a reduction in the size of supervisory bodies and for management compensation to be based not only on a company's profits, but also on the risks involved. In order to assert his shareholders' rights, Ebner also took legal action in individual cases, with the proceedings against the members of the Board of Directors of the then Union Bank of Switzerland (UBS) and the company itself becoming particularly well known. At times, the portfolio of investments held by BZ Group was worth over 30 billion Swiss francs. However, the share of debt capital was high.

Through aggressive advertising, Ebner also tried to attract small investors as customers for BZ Bank and introduced the BZ share account for them.

=== Crisis ===
The creeping decline of BZ Group Holding began with the sharp fall in share prices on the international stock markets that lasted for months after the bursting of the Internet bubble in 2000/2001 and the terrorist attacks on 11 September 2001. BZ Group, including the investment companies it managed, was hit disproportionately hard by the stock market slump due to its concentration on a small number of investments. A standstill agreement concluded with the lending banks in the summer of 2002 enabled the BZ Group to continue as a going concern. However, Ebner was forced to sell or transfer the majority of its holdings to the banks. This also affected controlling interests in the vision companies, which were transferred to Zürcher Kantonalbank.

The BZ Group was left with a majority stake in the listed real estate company Intershop as its main holding. The core of BZ Group, BZ Bank, was spun off from BZ Group in the spring of 2003 by Martin Ebner and his wife Rosmarie, together with management members Alfred Böni and Ralph Stadler, and has since continued to be run separately.

=== Recovery ===
Since the termination of the standstill agreement with the lending banks in July 2003, BZ Group Holding has recovered. In 2005, the holding company of the Group changed its name to Patinex AG and has been operating under this name since then. In the same year, Patinex acquired 12.5 percent of the reinsurer Converium and thus played a decisive role in the - initially hostile - takeover of Converium by the French reinsurance group SCOR. With a stake of around 8 percent, Ebner was the largest shareholder in SCOR via Patinex until the stake was sold in spring 2015. The stake in Intershop today amounts to around 33 percent. Patinex's other disclosed holdings include the Swiss listed companies Myriad, Temenos (since 2013) and Vifor Pharma. In the unlisted sector, Patinex holds a major stake in the Geneva-based immunology company NovImmune, among others. In 2008, Patinex acquired the Swiss airline Helvetic Airways and its associated flight school Horizon Swiss Flight Academy.

The Ebner couple ceded 70 percent of their stake in BZ Bank to Graubündner Kantonalbank as of 1 July 2022. In January 2025, the couple finalized the sale of their remaining 30% stake in BZ Bank to Graubündner Kantonalbank, which became the sole owner of the institution. This transaction completed the succession process. Following the sale, Martin Ebner continues to maintain business relations with GKB through his investment company, Patinex Management AG.

== Assets ==
According to Bilanz's richest list, his wealth in 2021 is 3 to 3.5 billion Swiss francs.

As of 2025, Martin Ebner's wealth is estimated at approximately CHF 3.8 billion, ranking him among the richest individuals in Switzerland.

== Personal life ==
He is married to Rosemarie, and lives in Wilen, Switzerland.
