= Swiss People's Party group =

Swiss People's Party group (V) Fraktion der Schweizerischen Volkspartei Groupe de l'Union démocratique du centre Gruppo dell'Unione democratica di Centro Fracziun da la Partida populara svizra
- Chamber: Swiss National Council and Council of States
- Foundation: 22 December 1919
- Previous name(s): Party of Farmers, Traders, and Bourgeois (until 1971)
- Member parties: SVP, Lega, EDU, MCR
- President: Thomas Aeschi
- General secretary: Raphael Vogel
- Representation: 62 / 246
- Ideology: Right-wing to far-right

The Swiss People's Party group (German: Fraktion der Schweizerischen Volkspartei, French: Groupe de l'Union Démocratique du Centre, Italian: Gruppo dell'Unione democratica di Centro, abbreviated V) is the largest parliamentary group in the Swiss Federal Assembly. It regroups the Swiss People's Party and other minor parties or independents caucusing with them.

== Composition ==
In the 47th legislature (2003–2007) the group contained the SVP/UDC and the Ticino League. In the 48th legislature (2007–2011) it was joined by the Federal Democratic Union (EDU) then by the Romandy Citizens' Movement (MCR) for the 49th legislature (2011–2015).

Composition of the Swiss People's Party group at the start of each legislature
| Legislature | National Council | | | | | Council of States | | Total |
| Legislature | SVP | Lega | EDU | MCR | Ind. | SVP | Ind. | Total |
|---|---|---|---|---|---|---|---|---|
| 51st (2019–2023) | 53 | 1 | 1 | 0 | 0 | 6 | 1 | 62 |
| 50th (2015–2019) | 64 | 2 | 0 | 1 | 1 | 5 | 1 | 74 |
| 49th (2011–2015) | 54 | 2 | 0 | 0 | 0 | 5 | 1 | 63 |
| 48th (2007–2011) | 64 | 1 | 1 | 0 | 0 | 6 | 0 | 72 |
| 47th (2003–2007) | 54 | 1 | 0 | 0 | 0 | 8 | 0 | 64 |

=== Historical composition ===
Historical composition of the Swiss People's Party group
| Legislature | NC | CS | Total | Notes |
|---|---|---|---|---|
Group of Farmers, Artisans and Bourgeois
| 25th (1919) | 25 | 1 | 26 | Gained 3 NC in 1920, then 2 more NC in 1921 |
| 26th (1922) | 35 | 1 | 36 | Lost 1 NC in 1923 |
| 27th (1925) | 30 | 1 | 31 | Lost 1 NC and gained 1 CS in 1928 |
| 28th (1928) | 31 | 3 | 34 | Lost 1 NC in 1931 |
| 29th (1931) | 30 | 3 | 33 | Lost 2 NC in 1935 |
| 30th (1935) | 21 | 3 | 24 | |
| 31st (1939) | 22 | 4 | 26 | |
| 32nd (1943) | 22 | 4 | 26 | |
| 33rd (1947) | 21 | 4 | 25 | Lost 1 CS in 1949, then gained 1 CS in 1951 |
| 34th (1951) | 23 | 3 | 26 | |
| 35th (1955) | 22 | 3 | 25 | |
| 36th (1969) | 23 | 4 | 27 | |
| 37th (1963) | 22 | 4 | 26 | |
| 38th (1967) | 21 | 3 | 24 | |
Swiss People's Party group
| 39th (1971) | 25 | 5 | 30 | |
| 40th (1975) | 21 | 5 | 26 | Gained 2 NC and lost 1 CS in 1979 |
| 41st (1979) | 23 | 5 | 28 | |
| 42nd (1983) | 23 | 5 | 28 | |
| 43rd (1987) | 25 | 4 | 29 | |
| 44th (1991) | 25 | 4 | 29 | |
| 45th (1995) | 29 | 5 | 34 | Gained 1 NC in 1997, then gained 2 CS in 1999 |
| 46th (1999) | 44 | 7 | 51 | Gained 1 NC in 2002 |

=== 46th legislature (1999–2003) ===
The group includes 45 national councillors and 7 councillors of states.

=== 47th legislature (2003–2007) ===
The group was formed with 64 members, of which 54 members of the National Council (53 from the SVP and 1 from the Ticino League), and 8 members of the Council of States (all SVP).

National Councillor Ulrich Siegrist left the group on 11 May 2006.

=== 48th legislature (2007–2011) ===
The group was formed with 70 members, of which 64 members of the National Council (62 from the SVP, 1 from the Ticino League, and 1 from the EDU) and 6 members of the Council of States (all SVP).

The EDU national councillor Christian Waber left on 18 December 2007. States councillor Werner Luginbühl (BE) and national councillors Brigitta Gadient (GR), Ursula Haller (BE), Hans Grunder (BE) and Hansjörg Hassler (GR) left the group on 15 September 2008 to later form the Conservative Democratic Party. National councillor Thomas Müller joined after defecting from the CVP on 14 February 2011. Adrian Amstutz (BE) was elected to the Council of States and joined the group on 6 March 2011.

=== 49th legislature (2011–2015) ===
The group was formed with 63 members, of which 57 members of the National Council (54 from the SVP, 2 from the Ticino League, and 1 from the MCR) and 6 members of the Council of States (5 SVP and independent Thomas Minder).

Roger Golay (MCR-GE) joined the National Council and the group on 3 December 2013. States councillor This Jenny (GL) died on 13 February 2014, his successor Werner Hösli was elected on 1 June 2014 and joined the group.

=== 50th legislature (2015–2019) ===
The group was formed with 74 members, of which 68 members of the National Council (65 from the SVP, 2 from the Ticino League, and 1 from the MCR) and 6 members of the Council of States (5 SVP and independent Thomas Minder).

=== 51st legislature (2019–2023) ===
The group was formed with 62 members, of which 55 members of the National Council (53 from the SVP, and one each from the Ticino League and the MCR) and 7 members of the Council of States (6 SVP and independent Thomas Minder).

== List of presidents of the group ==
The group is currently presided by national councillor Thomas Aeschi (ZG).

=== Party of the Party of Farmers, Traders and Independents ===
- Rudolf Minger (1919)
- Ernst Tobler (1927)
- Rudolf Minger (1928)
- Hans Stähli (1930)
- Rudolf Reichling sr. (1939)
- Otto Wartmann (1947)
- Karl Renold (1955)
- Hans Tschumi (1959)
- Otto Hess sr. (1961)
- Rudolf Gnägi (1963)
- Hans Conzett (1965)
- Hans Tschanz (1966)
- Erwin Akeret (1969)

=== Swiss People's Party ===
- Rudolf Etter (1971)
- Georg Brosi (1974)
- Hans-Peter Fischer 1977)
- Walter Augsburger (1979)
- Hans-Rudolf Nebiker (1982)
- Theo Fischer (1989)
- Samuel Schmid (1998)
- Walter Frey (1999)
- Caspar Baader (2001)
- Adrian Amstutz (2012)
- Thomas Aeschi (2017)
