= Louis-Ulysse Chopard =

Swiss watchmaker and entrepreneur

- Born: 4 May 1836
- Died: 30 January 1915 (aged 78)
- Occupation(s): Entrepreneur watchmaker
- Known for: Founder of Chopard
- Children: 2
- Parents: Félicien Chopard (father); Henriette (mother)

Louis-Ulysse Chopard (4 May 1836 – 30 January 1915) was a Swiss watchmaker and entrepreneur who was the founder of the luxury manufacturing and retail corporation Chopard.

== Biography ==
Louis-Ulysse Chopard was the second son of Félicien Chopard and his wife Henriette, who had four children. Félicien was an experienced framer and a man of tradition who encouraged his sons to learn the watchmaking trade.

As a young man, Louis-Ulysse Chopard quickly grasped the fact that it was the comptoirs or watch dealerships that earned the greatest profit from the work of the framers. Each spring, the agents picked up the movements, fitted the dials and hands, cased up the finished movements and they marketed the finished watches. It was therefore better to work independently and Louis-Ulysse wanted his brand. He created his L.U.C manufacturing company in Sonvilier, Switzerland at the age of 24, in 1860.

No watches were mass-produced but his clever blend of artistry and functionality soon won over a large number of customers. Having grasped that foreign markets represented the future of his timepieces, he set off to canvass customers in Eastern Europe, Russia and Scandinavia. In 1912, he visited Poland, Hungary and the Netherlands with his finest creations. Chopard chronometers and watches marked the passing of time at the court of Nicholas II of Russia. Louis-Ulysse Chopard had won himself an international clientele.

In 1859 and 1870 he had two children, Paul-Louis and Ida Hélène.
