= European Long Term Investment Fund =

A European Long-Term Investment Fund, often abbreviated to ELTIF, is a type of regulated investment fund established by the European Union to channel capital into companies and projects that require long-term financing. A common example of ELTIF investments includes large-scale infrastructure projects. ELTIFs are designed for both institutional and private investors across Europe.

One of the precursors to ELTIFs was the French Fonds d'Investissement de Proximité (FIP), which allowed individual and institutional investors to support regional economies and family-owned companies.

== Framework ==
ELTIFs operate under strict regulations outlined in Regulation (EU) 2015/760, designed to ensure transparency, protect investors, and promote stability in financial markets. Funds must meet specific criteria regarding eligible investments, portfolio composition, and risk management. They are also supervised by the national competent authorities in EU member states to ensure compliance with applicable laws.

An updated framework, often referred to as ELTIF 2.0, was introduced by the European Union. The revised regulation, (EU) 2023/606, was published on 15 March 2023.

== Private markets ==
Global private equity firm Partners Group was one of the pioneers in the adoption of the ELTIF structure. In 2017, the firm launched one of the first ELTIFs in Luxembourg, providing private markets with access to private equity assets.

Over the following years the market grew steadily, with new ELTIFs offered by a variety of managers. As of November 2021, 57 ELTIFs had been registered in only 4 member states. These included Luxembourg, France, Italy and Spain. In the United Kingdom, it is expected that Long-Term Asset Funds (LTAF) will replace ELTIF in 2023.

ELTIF 2.0 was implemented in January 2024. Partners Group was again an early adopter, launching a private equity evergreen fund compliant under the revised framework a few months later. A growing number of private equity firms have started offering ELTIFs under the revised framework. By the end of 2024, the market demonstrated strong year-on-year growth, with ELTIF assets under management reaching €20.5 billion.
