= Walter Frey =

Swiss businessman and politician (born 1943)

- Official portrait, c. 1990s

Member of the National Council (Switzerland)
- In office 30 November 1987 – 25 November 2001
- Constituency: Canton of Zurich

President of the Swiss People's Party group
- In office 1999 – 2001

Personal details
- Born: Walter Frey; 30 July 1943 (age 83) Zurich, Switzerland
- Spouse: Barbara Curti (m. 1987)
- Children: 3
- Education: London School of Economics
- Occupation: Businessman, politician
- Website: Parliament website

Military service
- Allegiance: Switzerland
- Branch/service: Swiss Armed Forces
- Years of service: 1961–1998
- Rank: Captain

Walter Frey (German pronunciation: [fʁaɪ]; Fry; born 30 July 1943) is a Swiss businessman and politician who most notably served on the National Council for the Swiss People's Party between 1987 and 2001, between 1999 and 2001, concurrently serving as President of the Swiss People's Party group.

In 1969, Frey took over the management of Emil Frey Group, an automotive importer and dealership, which he would turn into a leading company in Europe. Frey is among the wealthiest Swiss with an estimated net worth of $3.9 billion, estimated by Forbes as of July 2025. He is also the president of ZSC Lions.

== Early life and education ==
Frey was born 30 July 1943 in Zurich, Switzerland, to German-born Emil Frey (1898–1995), businessman, and his second wife Rosa "Rösly" Frey (née Meyer). He had two sisters; Friedel Schalch (née Frey) and Esther Rhomberg (née Frey).

His paternal family was Swiss originally from Biberstein, Aargau, although his father was born in Brombach, Grand Duchy of Baden, to expatriate parents. Emil Frey relocated to Switzerland after his apprenticeship as a mechanic, initially living in Basel, then Zurich. In 1924, he founded a small workshop for bicycles and motorcycles, which would evolve into Emil Frey Group.

After completing his Matura, Frey briefly studied for two semesters at the London School of Economics in 1966.

== Personal life ==
Frey married Barbara Curti, a daughter of Rudolf Curti (1924–1999) and Helen Curti (née Köhler; 1929–2021), both of Baden, Switzerland. They had three children;

- Kathrin Frey (born 1988), married Stephan Schlumpf, two children.
- Lorenz Frey (born 1990), a racing driver with Emil Frey Racing, married Liechtenstein-born Michèle Hilti (born 1987), an heiress and board member of Hilti.
- Nora Frey (born 1993).

Frey resides in Küsnacht on Lake Zurich. He is an Anglophile and admirer of Winston Churchill. In 2013, Frey was awarded the Order of the Rising Sun.
