= Matthias Reinhart =

Swiss entrepreneur; co-founder and chairman of VZ Holding

- Born: August 1960 (age 66); Switzerland
- Education: University of St. Gallen (lic. oec. HSG, 1986)
- Occupation: Business executive
- Years active: 1993–present
- Employer: VZ Group
- Known for: Co-founding VZ Holding
- Title: Chairman, VZ Holding Ltd.
- Children: 2

Matthias Daniel Reinhart (born August 1960) is a Swiss entrepreneur and business executive best known as co-founder of Swiss financial company VZ Holding (marketed as VZ VermögensZentrum). He served as VZ’s chief executive officer from its founding in 1993 until the end of 2022, and has been chairman of the board since 2023.

== Early life and education ==
Reinhart studied business administration at the University of St. Gallen (HSG), graduating in 1986 with the degree lic. oec. HSG. He then worked for five years at McKinsey & Company in Zurich and Chicago before co-founding VZ.

== Career ==
=== Founding of VZ and development (1993 - 2007) ===
In 1993 Reinhart co-founded the business originally known as VZ VersicherungsZentrum AG (later VZ VermögensZentrum AG) with his business partner Max Bolanz, positioning it as an independent, fee-only financial advisor. As CEO, he oversaw expansion from insurance intermediation into holistic financial advice, asset management and, later, banking services (VZ Depotbank).

=== IPO and growth (2007–2022) ===
The holding company, VZ Holding Ltd., listed on the SIX Swiss Exchange in March 2007 (ticker: VZN). During Reinhart’s tenure as CEO, the group grew to operate across Switzerland and into Germany and the UK, scaling fee-based advisory and asset-management services.

=== Transition to chairman (2023 - present) ===
On 3 March 2022 VZ announced that Reinhart would become chairman in 2023 and that long-time executive Giulio Vitarelli would assume the CEO role; the handover took effect at year-end 2022 and was confirmed by shareholders in April 2023. As chairman, he continues to outline strategy alongside the executive team in shareholder communications.

== Other positions ==
Company filings list Reinhart’s external mandates, including seats on the boards of the Neue Zürcher Zeitung (NZZ), OM Pharma, Optimus Holding, Madarex, and other Swiss companies.

== Personal life ==
Reinhart lives in Küsnacht ZH and is married with two children. Public filings list his month and year of birth as August 1960 and nationality as Swiss.

== Net worth ==
Reinhart is VZ’s founder and main shareholder. As of 31 December 2024, he held 61.16% of VZ Holding Ltd.’s shares, directly and indirectly via his vehicle Madarex Ltd., according to the group’s corporate-governance report.

In 2024, the Luzerner Zeitung reported that Reinhart’s wealth was estimated at CHF 3.5–4 billion in that year’s regional breakdown of Die 300 Reichsten. Analysts attribute changes primarily to VZ Holding’s share-price performance and his disclosed majority shareholding.

== See also ==
- VZ Holding
