= ROSEN Group =

Swiss asset information provider

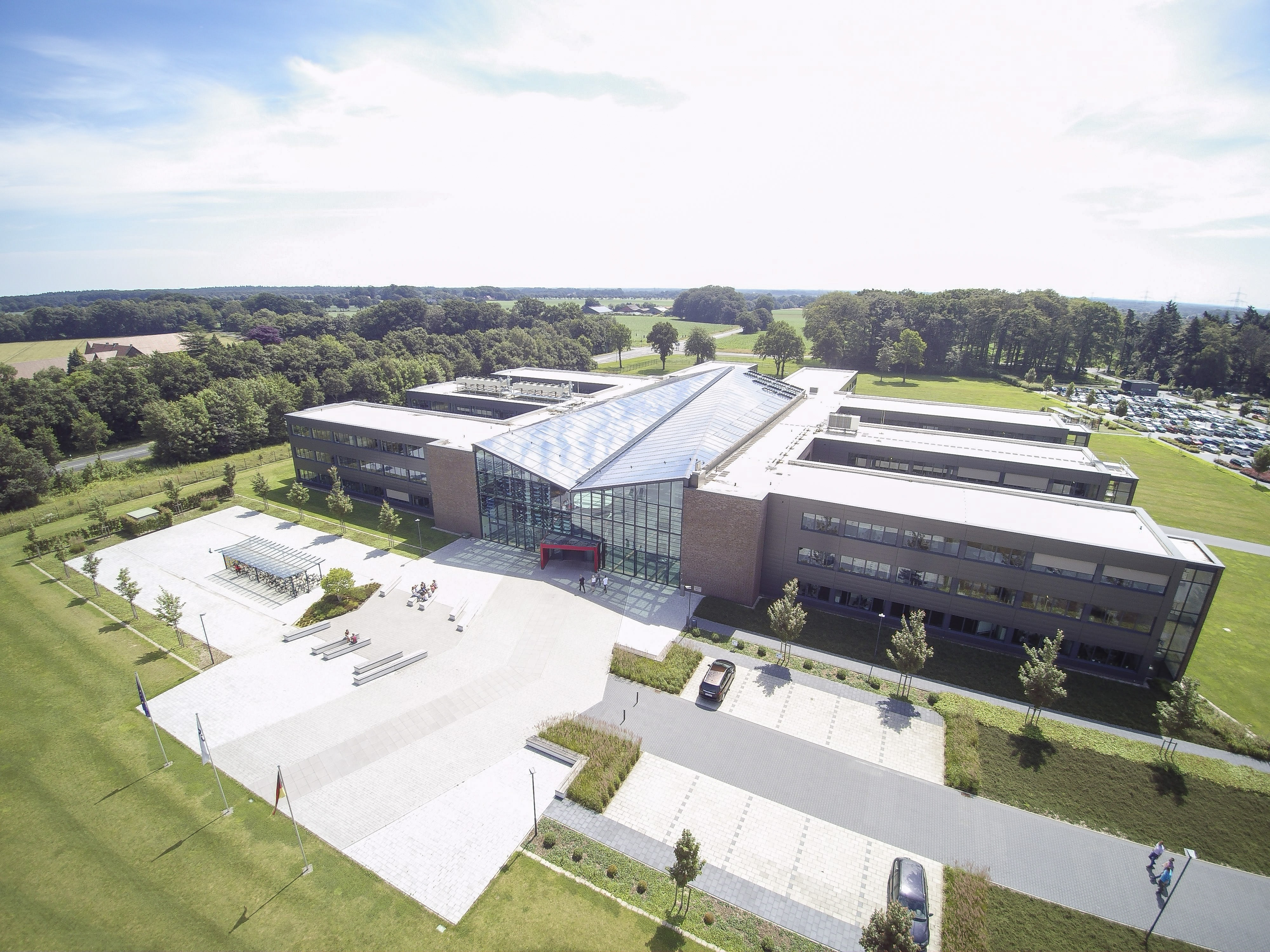
- Aerial view of the ROSEN Group Innovation Center in Lingen, Germany
- Trade name: ROSEN Group
- Company type: Joint-stock company
- Industry: Information services, in particular for the oil and gas industry; engineering and sensor technology.
- Founded: 1981 in Lingen (Ems)
- Founder: Hermann Rosen
- Fate: Acquired by Partners Group
- Headquarters: Stans (Nidwalden), Switzerland
- Key people: Andreas Opfermann (CEO)
- Revenue: 430 million EUR (Services) (2016)
- Number of employees: ~4,000 (2023)
- Website: rosen-group.com

ROSEN Group is a global technology company headquartered in Stans that specializes in the research, development, production, operation of inspection devices for pipelines and other complex technical systems. It offers its services and products to the oil and gas industry and other sectors.

In November 2023, the former family business was acquired by Partners Group for an undisclosed amount.

== History ==
=== Beginnings ===
After completing his studies of measurement and control technology, Hermann Rosen founded an engineering company in Lingen (Ems) in the mid-1970s. Initially he worked with devices and services related to measuring technology for the agricultural sector, among other things. The foundation of the ROSEN Group was laid in 1981. The company worked for customers from the oil and gas industry and offered mainly services for pipelines. In 1988, the company relocated to the industrial park in Lingen (Ems).

=== Expansion ===
In the 1990s, the current ROSEN Group founded a number of branch offices abroad. The locations included: United States, Canada, Mexico, Argentina, Malaysia and Australia.

In 2000, the company moved its headquarters from Lingen to Stans in Switzerland. In the following decade, the network of branch offices expanded to include locations in The Netherlands, United Kingdom, Saudi Arabia, United Arab Emirates, Ukraine, Russia, Brazil, and Colombia.

Despite the relocation of headquarters and corporate expansion, Lingen remained an important location. In 2006, a separate plastics production was established. In September 2012, the Prime Minister of Lower Saxony, David McAllister, opened ROSEN Group's Innovation Center. One year later, a new logistics center using the Kanban system was opened in Lingen.

In October 2013, the company carried out the longest nonstop inspection run until that time in the Nord Stream Pipeline (1,224 km).

Hermann Rosen has managed the corporate group since its inception until 2023. Only for the time period from the beginning of 2013 to the end of 2014, Friedrich Hecker acted as CEO.

=== Sale to the Partners Group ===
In 2023, the ROSEN Group was majority-acquired by the Swiss Partners Group. In the course of this, the company reorganized its business structure and divested itself of the so-called new ventures, i.e. development projects that were no longer part of the ROSEN Group's main area of activity. Hermann Rosen remained a minority shareholder. The position of CEO was taken over by Erik Cornelissen. Hermann Rosen merged the former new ventures into an independent company (Rosenxt).

== Present situation ==
=== Business Segments ===
The group, led by CEO Andreas Opfermann, divides its business into four areas:

- The Oil and Gas division is responsible for pipeline inspections worldwide. In addition to pipelines, the group also inspects other industrial facilities and systems such as tank farms and pressure vessels, refineries, and spiral pipes.
- The Future Fuel business area focuses on ensuring a sustainable, reliable, and affordable energy supply in line with the global energy transition. The expansion of the transport of renewable and low-carbon gases such as hydrogen, carbon dioxide, and ammonia aims to create a decarbonized and integrated energy system. The Group supports plant operators in repurposing their facilities by contributing its experience in inspecting pipelines that transport various media and its data pool.
- The Mining business unit is dedicated to the proactive maintenance and inspection of slurry pipelines. This includes industrial plants and maintenance equipment that are exposed to the special challenges of the mining industry. The plants are inspected inline and technically evaluated, particularly with regard to weak points and hazardous areas.
- In the Offshore business unit, the group focuses its services on offshore plants with their pipelines, distributors, processing plants, etc.

=== Equipment and data ===
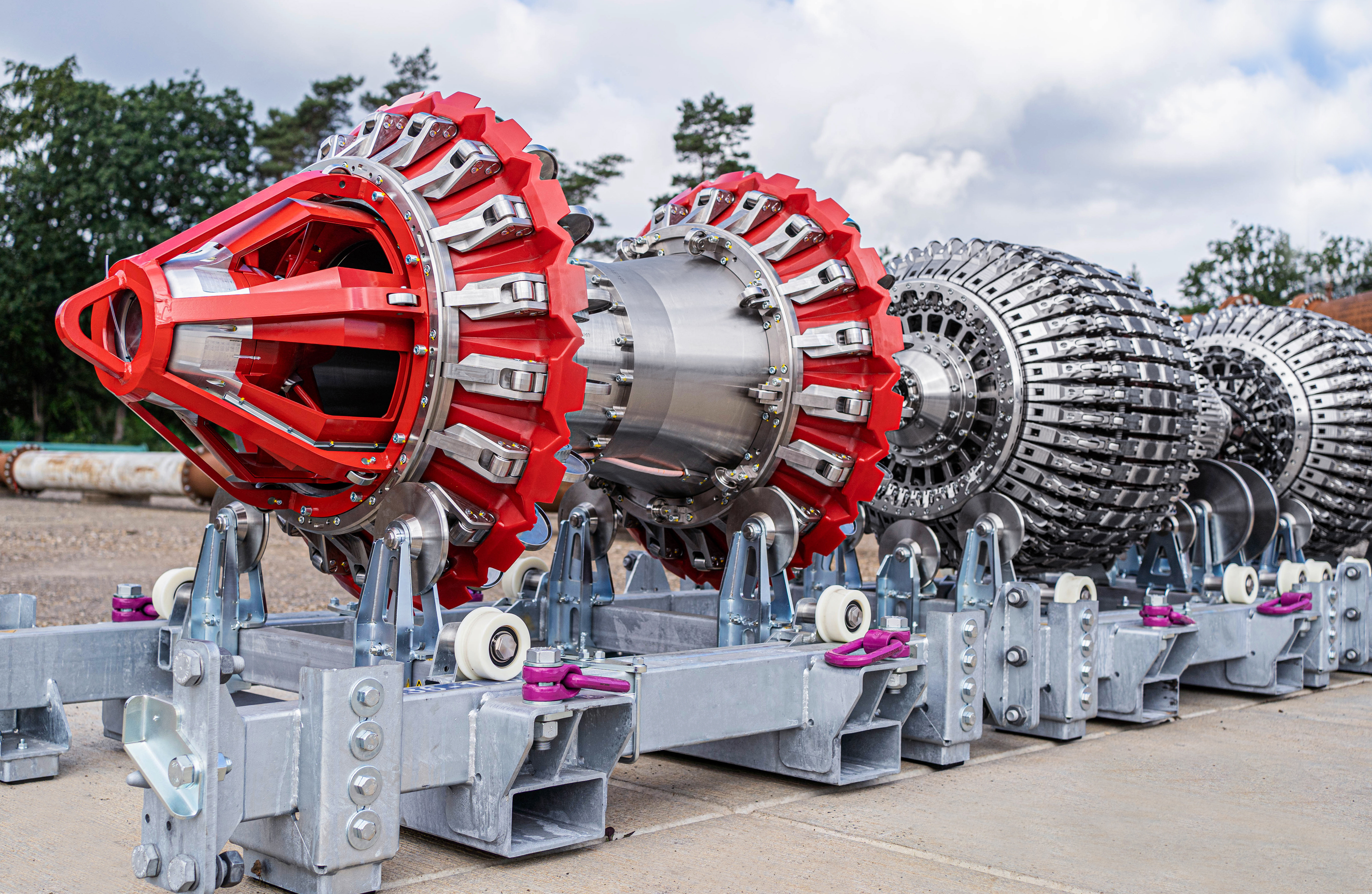
Inline inspection device (“pig”) from the ROSEN Group

Inspection devices, e.g. “pigs”, are used in all business areas. They are developed and manufactured in-house. According to the company, their vertical range of manufacture is between 85 and 90 percent.

The large amounts of data collected during inspections are processed, analyzed, and made available to customers for decision-making purposes. The services include inspection, diagnosis and the development of programs for maintenance and repair planning as well as for the integrity of technical equipment and systems.

=== Locations ===
According to its own information, the group has over 40 locations in North, Central, and South America, Europe, Asia, and Australia, it operates in more than 110 countries.

== Miscellaneous ==
=== Educational Activities ===
ROSEN Group is very active in the STEM area to provide advancement for children, youth, and university students. Since 1995, the company has been endowing the Advancement Award for Physics (Förderpreis Physik) of the University of Osnabrück. Together with other companies from the Emsland region, ROSEN Group supports university students through the Emsland Scholarship (Emslandstipendium). In addition, ROSEN Group is also one of the patrons of the German national scholarship (Deutschlandstipendium).

To support its international employees and their children, ROSEN Group established a bilingual inhouse daycare (ROKIDS) in Lingen in 2007, the first of its kind in the Emsland district. In the fall of 2015, ROSEN Group's bilingual elementary school (ROBIGS) opened its doors in Lingen. An extracurricular program for school children and youth was established in early 2016 (ROYOUTH). The daycare, elementary school, and extracurricular program have since been organized under a separate subsidiary.

=== International Awards ===
In 2015, ROSEN Group won the Global Pipeline Award presented by the Pipeline Division of the American Society of Mechanical Engineers (ASME) for its RoMat PGS service. Novel measuring technology allows the determination of carbon steel line pipes’ yield strength for the first time. Measured yield strength of line pipe is used to determine the pipe grade of every pipeline section referring to technical standard API 5L. In 2017, the Canadian Energy Pipeline Association recognized the company for developing the EMAT pipeline inspection service as an innovation for inspections in the oil and gas industry. In 2025, the ROSEN Group won the Honoris Award from the Consejo Colombiano de Seguridad, a non-profit organization in Colombia that promotes occupational safety and health in the workplace.
