= SCOR SE =

French reinsurance company

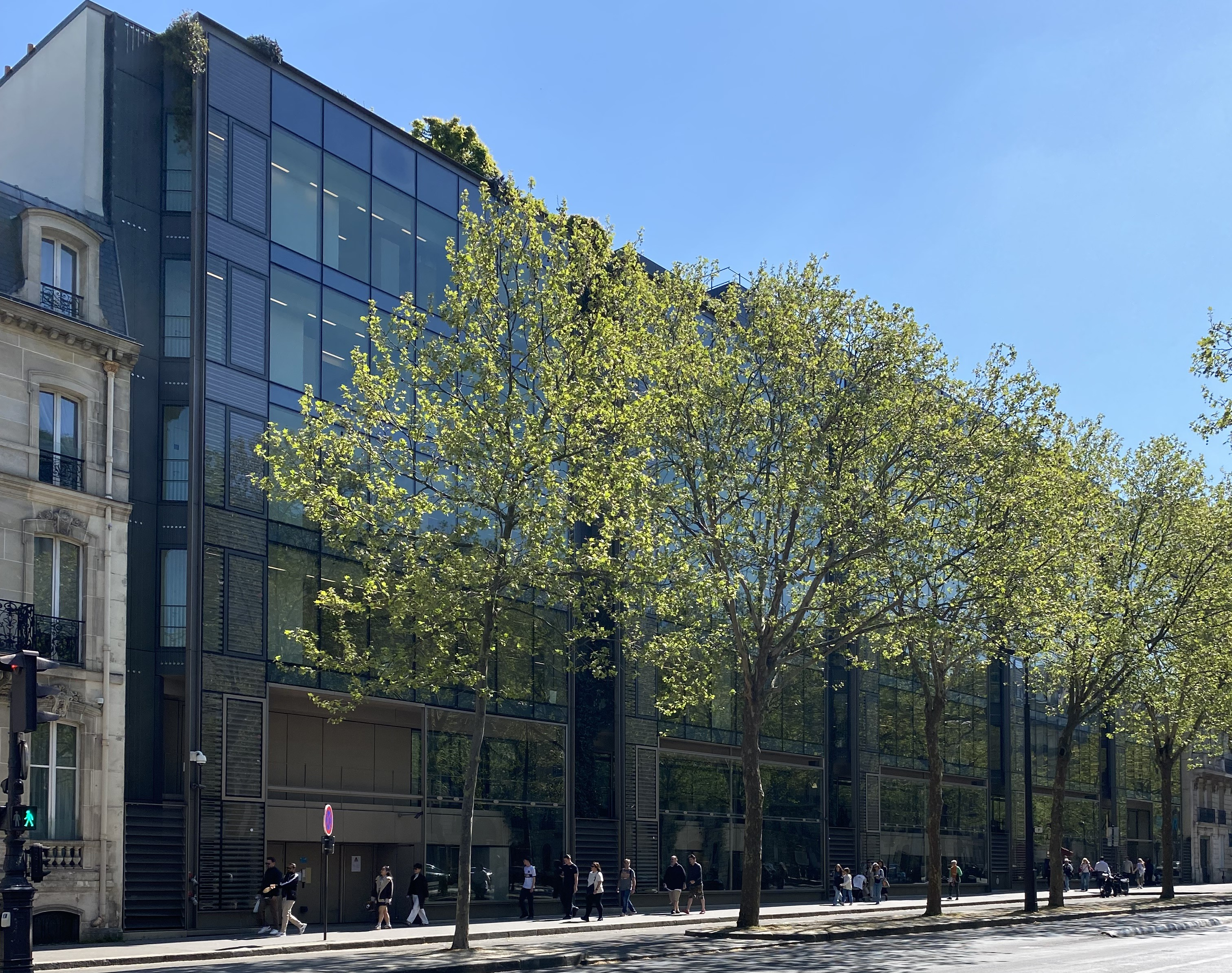
- Current head office of SCOR at 5, avenue Kléber in Paris, formerly headquarters of Compagnie Bancaire
- Type: Societas Europaea
- Traded as: Euronext: SCR; CAC Next 20
- Industry: Financial services
- Founded: 1970; 56 years ago
- Headquarters: Paris, France
- Area served: Worldwide
- Key people: Fabrice Brégier (Chairman) and Thierry Léger (CEO)
- Services: Reinsurance, asset management
- Revenue: €19.7 billion (2022)
- Operating income: €1 million (2022)
- Net income: €-301 million (2022)
- Total assets: €55.3 billion (2022)
- Total equity: €5.1 billion (2022)
- Number of employees: 3,522 (2022)
- Website: www.scor.com

SCOR SE is a French tier 1 reinsurance company providing Property and Casualty (P&C) and Life reinsurance. It is one of the leading reinsurers in the world. Created in 1970 with the backing of the French government, its original name was Société Commerciale de Réassurance, hence "SCOR". The SE acronym indicates that the company is a Societas Europaea (European company). In 2007, it became the first French listed company to use the SE acronym in its name.

== History ==
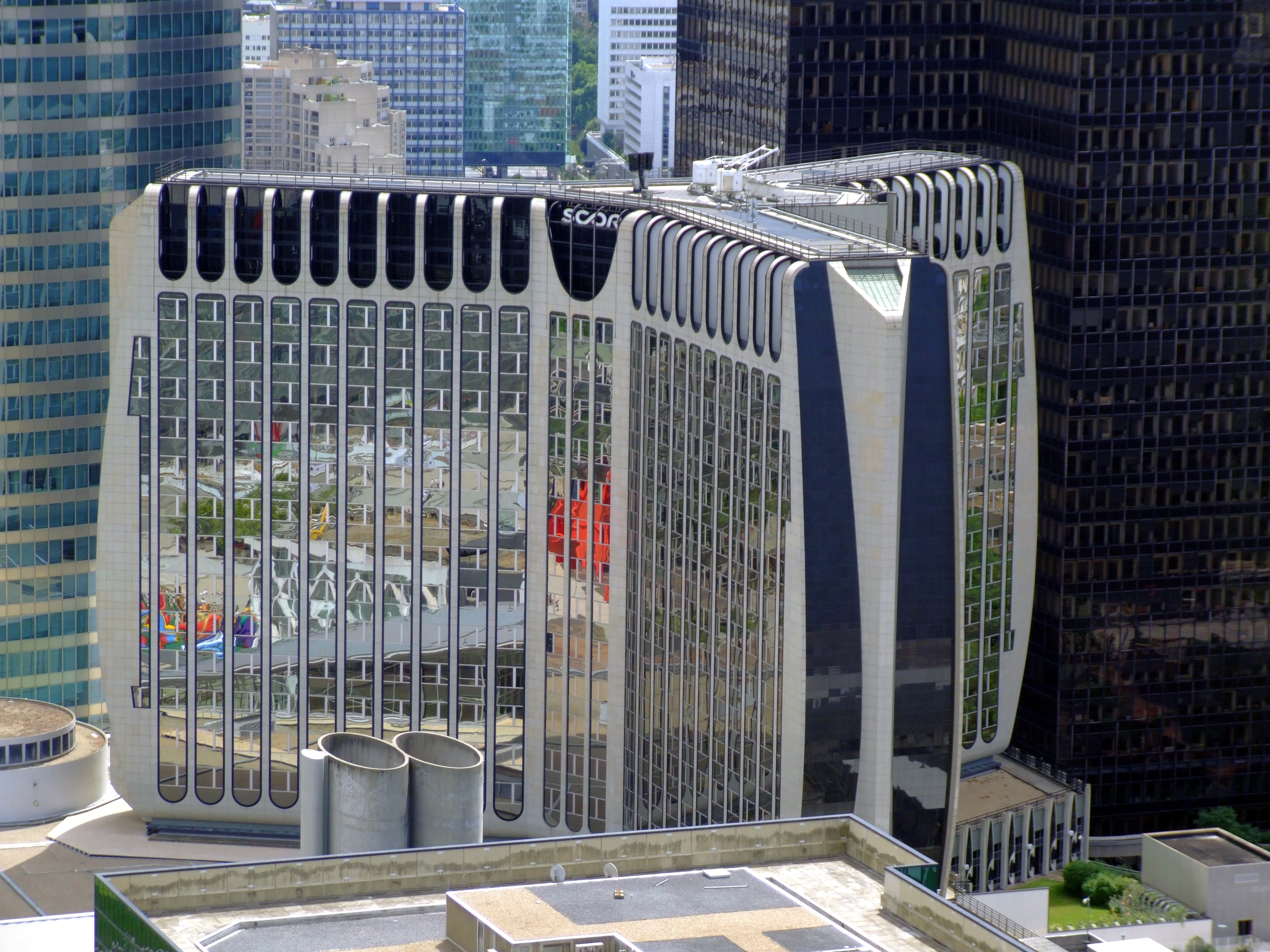
Building in Paris La Défense that was SCOR's head office from 1983 to 2012

SCOR SE was founded in 1970 in Paris, France. SCOR today is the world's fourth largest reinsurer and has a presence in 160 countries worldwide with more than 3,000 employees.

In 1996, SCOR acquired the reinsurance business of Allstate.

In 2002, Denis Kessler was named the chairman and CEO after a near collapse of the company. Kessler was brought on board in order to restore the reinsurer's financial performance. Kessler made a number of acquisitions throughout his tenure. These include ReMark, Revios, Converium, Transamerica Re, and Generali US.

The firm's shares are listed on NYSE Euronext Paris and form part of the CAC Next 20 index. In 2007, SCOR de-listed itself from the New York Stock Exchange.

In May 2019, SCOR purchased Coriolis Capital, an insurance-linked securities fund manager. The purchase was finalized in September 2019, increasing the company's ILS portfolio to over $2 billion.

=== SCOR Foundation for Science ===
In 2011, SCOR founded the SCOR Corporate Foundation for Science to support scientific research and risk-related knowledge.

== Main operating lines ==
The main companies of SCOR SE (officially typeset as SCOR) include SCOR Global P&C, which provides property and casualty reinsurance, SCOR Global Life, which provides life reinsurance, and SCOR Global Investments, an asset management company.

=== Business units ===
SCOR consists of several business units:

- Reinsurance: include Property & Casualty and Life & Health units
- Speciality Insurance: include SCOR Business Solutions and SCOR Syndicate units.
- Asset Management: includes SCOR Global Investments unit, which had total investments of nearly €30 billion in 2019 with total invested assets of €20.6 billion
