= Jean-Daniel Gerber =

Swiss economist (born 1946)

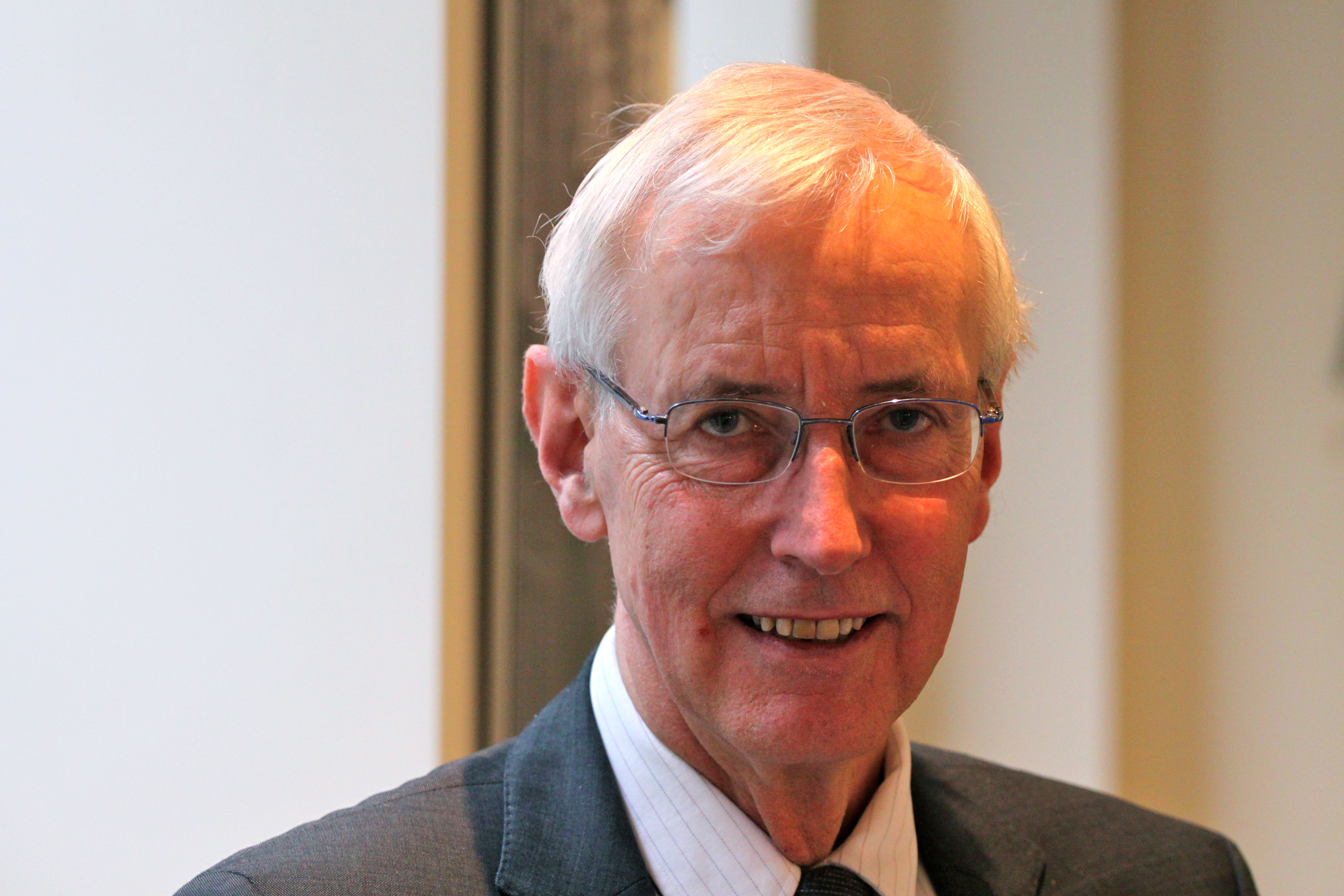
Jean-Daniel Gerber, State Secretary and Director of the State Secretariat for Economic Affairs (SECO) in the Federal Department of Economic Affairs.

Jean-Daniel Gerber is a Swiss economist (born 1946). He was a delegate to the World Trade Organization (WTO), and later executive director of the World Bank Board.

== Career ==
In the late 1970s, Gerber was a Swiss delegate to the World Trade Organization. He later headed up the Developing Countries Section at Switzerland's then Federal Office for Foreign Economic Affairs, and then moved to the Swiss Embassy in Washington as head of the Finance, Economics and Trade Division.

In the mid-1990s, Gerber spent five years as an executive director and as dean of the World Bank Board, before being appointed director of the Federal Office for Migration at Switzerland’s Federal Department of Justice and Police in 1997. In 2004, he became state secretary and director of Switzerland's State Secretariat for Economic Affairs (SECO), retiring from this post in March 2011.

Gerber chairs the board of SIFEM (Swiss Investment fund for Emerging Markets) and is a board member of Lonza Group AG. Gerber is chairman of the Swiss Society for the Common Good and the association Swiss Sustainable Finance, and a member of AOAF-Foundation. He has an honorary doctorate from the University of Berne.

== Personal life ==
He is married to Elisabeth Gerber-Graber, with whom he has two children.
