= Diana Gutjahr =

Swiss politician (born 1984) from Thurgau

Diane Gutjhar
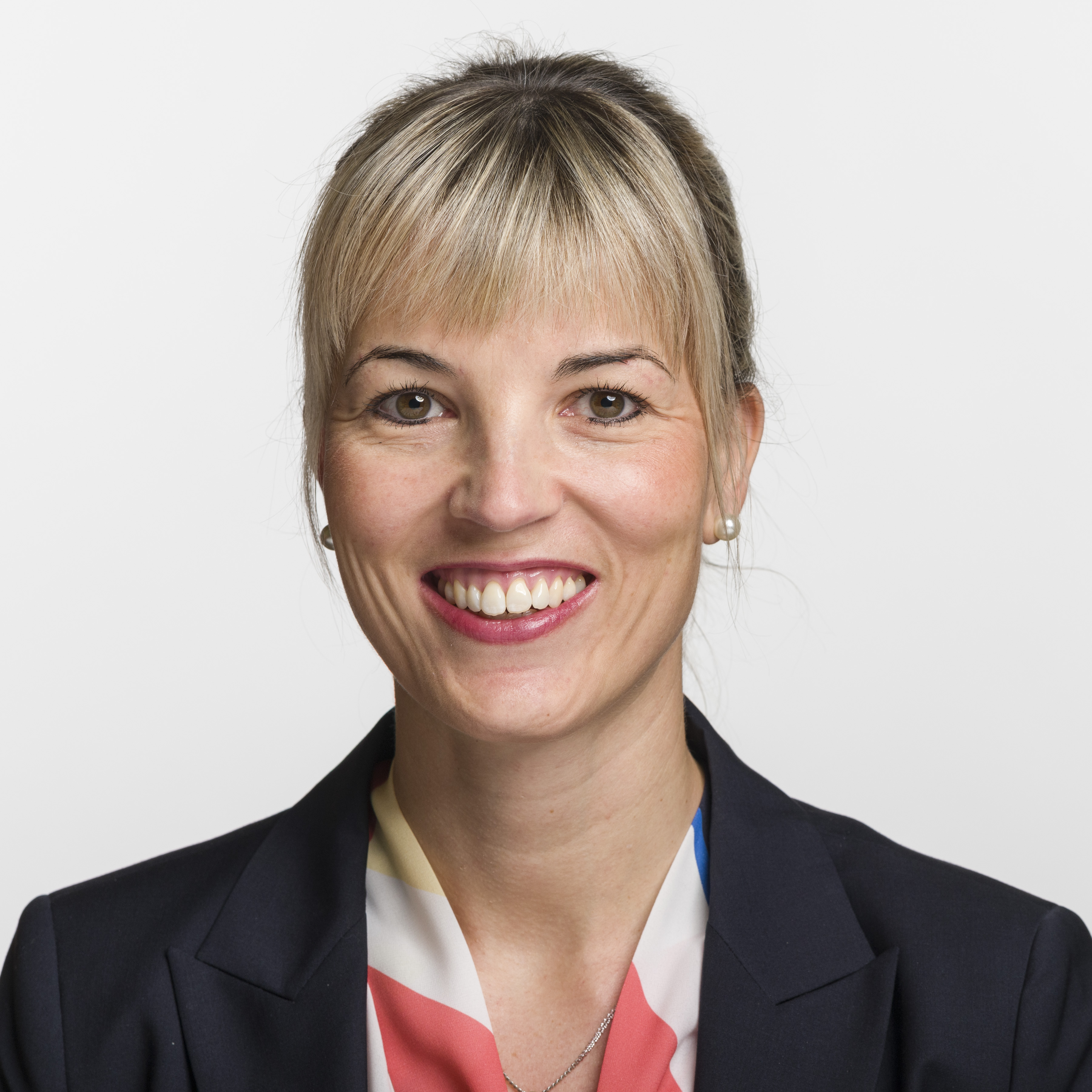
- Diana Gutjahr (2019)

Member of the National Council
- Incumbent
- Assumed office 27 November 2017
- Preceded by: Hansjörg Walter
- Constituency: Canton of Thurgau

Personal details
- Born: Diane Gutjhar; 13 January 1984 (age 42) Münsterlingen
- Citizenship: Swiss
- Party: Swiss People's Party
- Occupation: manager

Diana Gutjahr (born 13 January 1984 in Münsterlingen) is a Swiss politician. She is currently a member of the National Council for the Swiss People's Party from the Canton of Thurgau since 27 November 2017.

== Career ==
From April 2012 to October 2017, Gutjahr was a member of the Grand Council of Thurgau.

She was selected by her party to replace Hansjörg Walter in the National Council of Switzerland in November 2017, after he retired. She kept her seat in the parliamentary elections of 20 October 2019 with the best result in the canton of Thurgau. In parliament, she works on topics of education and the economy.

She leads the Thurgau business association and the association of employers in Romanshorn as well as the local branch of the SVP in Amriswil.

== Personal life ==
Diana Gutjahr studied business after an apprenticeship in office management (KV-Lehre). She is a board member of the Ernst Fischer AG, Stahl- und Metallbau in Romanshorn, which she is managing together with her husband, Severin Gutjahr.

Gutjahr has one son and lives in Amriswil.
