= Chopard =

Swiss manufacturer and retailer of luxury watches, jewellery and accessories

Le Petit-Fils de L.-U. Chopard & Cie S.A.
- Trade name: Chopard
- Type: Private (S.A.)
- Industry: Watchmaking; Luxury goods
- Founded: 1860; 166 years ago
- Founder: Louis-Ulysse Chopard
- Headquarters: Geneva, Switzerland
- Key people: Co-Presidents: Caroline Scheufele; Karl-Friedrich Scheufele
- Products: Watches, jewellery
- Production output: 75,000 watches (2016); 75,000 jewelleries (2016)
- Revenue: CHF 500 million+ (2016)
- Owner: Scheufele family
- Website: chopard.com

Le Petit-Fils de L.-U. Chopard & Cie S.A., commonly known as Chopard (French pronunciation: [ʃɔpaʁ]), is a Swiss manufacturer and retailer of watches, jewellery and accessories. Founded in 1860 by Louis-Ulysse Chopard in Sonvilier, Switzerland, Chopard has been owned by the Scheufele family of Germany since 1963.

The company is headquartered in Geneva and has a site in Fleurier, Canton of Neuchâtel, that manufactures watch movements.

== History ==
=== Early history ===
The company founder, Louis-Ulysse Chopard, was a Swiss watchmaker who grew up in Sonvilier, a town in Swiss Jura. In 1860, he established his L.U.C. manufacturing company in Sonvilier, having observed that it was more profitable to market a finished watch than to just make the mechanical movement.

After Louis-Ulysse's death in 1915, the company was taken over by his son Paul-Louis and grandson Paul-André. The company specialised in making pocket watches and ladies’ wristwatches. In 1921, Paul-Louis moved the company operations to a larger town, Chaux-de-Fonds, in the Canton of Neuchâtel. In 1937, at that time a company of 150 employees, the company relocated to Geneva. This enabled the movements made by the company to be certified with the Geneva Seal, a mark applied only to watch movements made in the Canton of Geneva. Paul-André took over the company in 1943.

In 1963, having no children wishing to continue in the business, Paul-André Chopard sold it to Karl Scheufele III, a German goldsmith and watchmaker from Pforzheim, who was seeking a watch movement manufacturer exclusively for his own business.

=== Recent developments ===
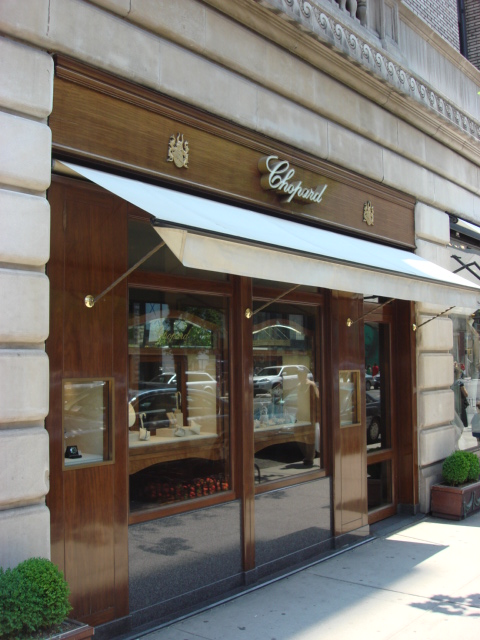
Store on Madison Avenue in New York City

In 1974, the Chopard factory moved from the center of Geneva to Meyrin-Geneva and in 1976 the company started making watches that contained its signature free-floating diamond behind sapphire glass. In the 1980s, the company expanded into making sports watches for men and diamond jewellery for women.

In 1996, the company established its own complete watch movement manufacturing facility in Fleurier, in the Swiss Canton of Neuchâtel. Prior to that time, all Chopard's movements had been assembled from third-party components. The movements made in Fleurier were intended for the high-end watches in the Chopard range.

In 2010, the company celebrated its 150th anniversary, by which time the company's estimated sales were €550 million in total (of which €250 million were from watches) with about 100 stores around the world.

In 2014, Chopard recorded sales of CHF800m (US$915m) and had roughly 2,000 employees worldwide, of whom 900 were working in Switzerland. The European Patent Office lists more than 20 references to Chopard since 2002.

In 2015, French actress Marion Cotillard designed a bracelet for Chopard's Green Carpet Collection made of ethical Fairmined-certified gold.

In December 2018, World Wide Fund for Nature (WWF) released a report assigning environmental ratings to 15 major watch manufacturers and jewelers in Switzerland. Chopard was given a below-average environmental rating as "Lower Midfield", suggesting that the manufacturer has only taken a few actions addressing the impact of its manufacturing activities on the environment and climate change. Nevertheless, Chopard has been promoting its products as being made from ethical and sustainable sourced gold since 2013.

In 2020, Cotillard designed her own sustainable jewelry collection for Chopard entitled "Ice Cube Capsule". She designed seven items curated from Fairmined-certified ethical gold and diamonds.

The company produces around 75,000 timepieces and 75,000 jewelry pieces each year, and is an active member of the Federation of the Swiss Watch Industry FH.

== Auction record ==
A Chopard "Happy Diamond" wristwatch was sold in auction by Christie's for around US$1.67 million (CHF 1,685,000) in Geneva on November 10, 2015. The watch has quartz movement and carries a pink marquise-cut diamond, weighing approximately 2.62 carats, and a blue marquise-cut diamond, weighing approximately 1.48 carat.

== Sponsorship ==
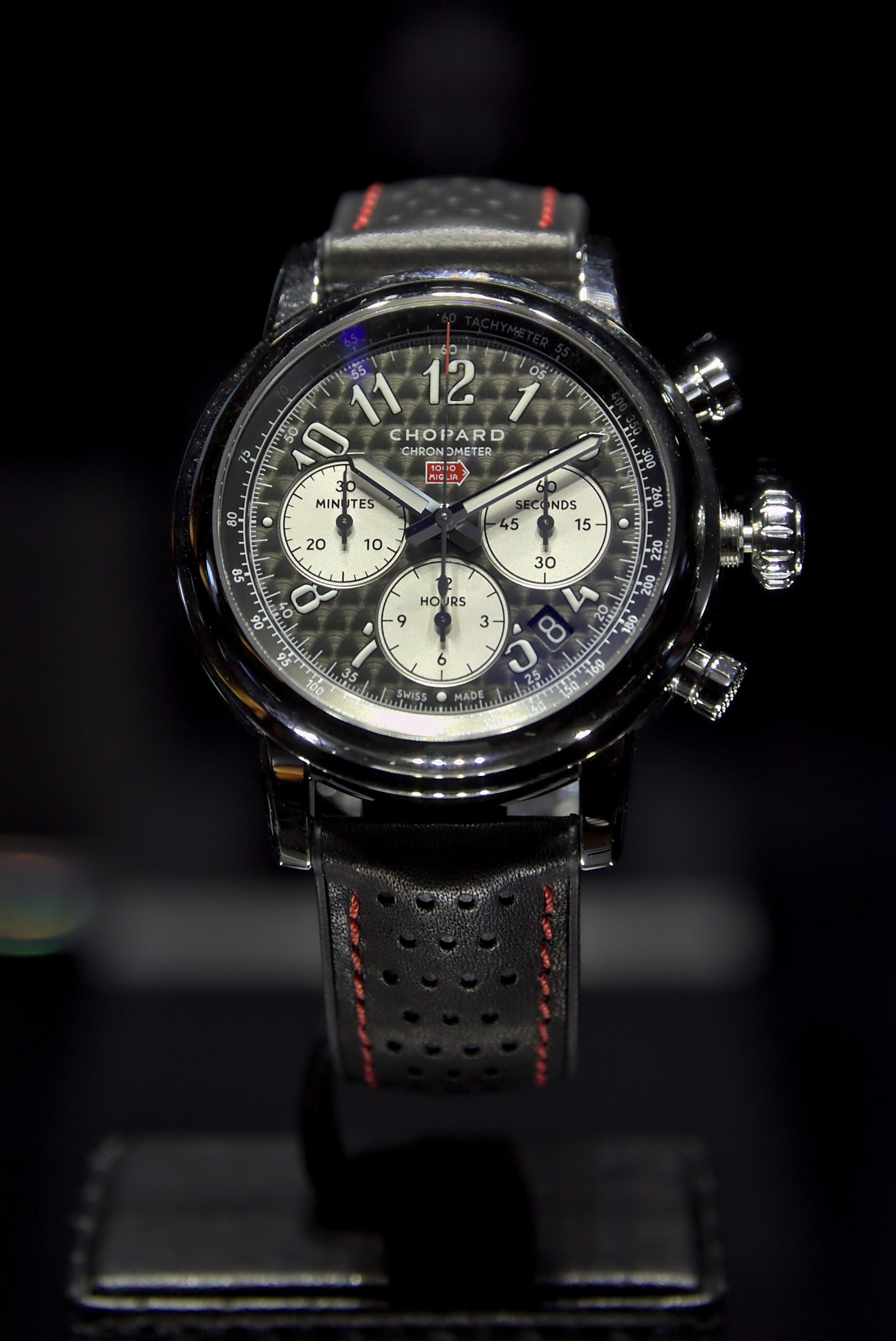
Chopard Mille Miglia watch, 2018

Chopard is a corporate partner of:

- The Mille Miglia car rally since 1988.
- The Cannes Film Festival since 1998, sponsoring the Trophée Chopard prize and making the Palme d’Or trophy. To commemorate the 70th anniversary of the Cannes Film Festival and the 20th anniversary of their partnership, Chopard created a special Palme D'Or adorned with 'Fairmined' diamonds.
- The Historic Grand Prix of Monaco as official timekeeper since 2002.

== See also ==
- Chopard Diamond Award
- List of watch manufacturers
