= BZ Bank =

Swiss private bank

- Native name: BZ Bank Aktiengesellschaft
- Formerly: BZ Bank Zürich Aktiengesellschaft
- Type: Private
- Industry: Financial services
- Founded: 1985; 41 years ago in Zürich, Switzerland
- Founder: Martin Ebner
- Headquarters: Freienbach, Switzerland
- Key people: Marc Schurter (CEO); Dieter Göldi (CFO)
- AUM: CHF 7.89 billion
- Number of employees: 10 (2023)
- Website: bzbank.ch

BZ Bank (legally BZ Bank Aktiengesellschaft) is a Swiss private bank primarily active in equity transactions. It specializes in stock trading, wealth management, stock and investment consulting, collective joint-ventures and corporate advisory. As a result of this specialization, BZ Bank's main income segment is the commission and service business. As of the 2024 balance sheet date, assets under management were CHF 7.89 billion. Profit in 2024 financial year amounted to CHF 12.99 million.

== History ==
BZ Bank was founded in 1985 by Martin Ebner in Zürich, Switzerland under the name BZ Bank Zürich Aktiengesellschaft. Since the end of 1997, the bank's headquarters are located in Freienbach (SZ) and offices near Wollerau (SZ). In June 2022, Martin Ebner and his wife Rosmarie, who were the majority shareholders of the bank since its founding, sold 70% of their shares to Graubündner Kantonalbank. On January 22 2025 Martin and Rosmarie Ebner transferred the remaining 30% to Graubündner Kantonalbank, which has been the sole shareholder ever since.
