= Partners Group =

Swiss-based global private equity firm

Partners Group Holding AG

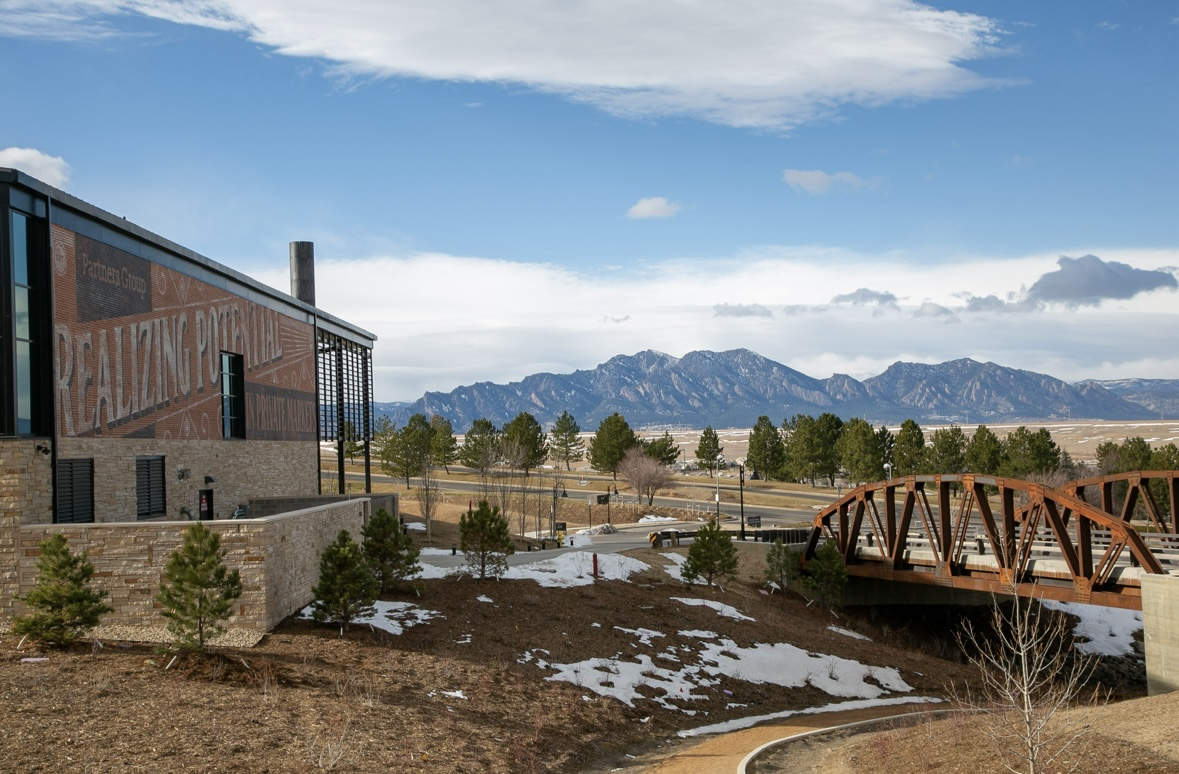
- Type: Aktiengesellschaft
- Traded as: SIX: PGHN
- Industry: Private equity, private credit, royalties, real estate, infrastructure
- Founded: 1996; 30 years ago
- Founder: Marcel Erni; Urs Wietlisbach; Alfred Gantner
- Headquarters: Baar, Switzerland
- Key people: Steffen Meister (Executive Chairman); David Layton (CEO)
- Revenue: ▲2’563 million CHF (2025)
- AUM: ▲US$186 billion (2026)
- Number of employees: ▲2,000 (2025)
- Website: www.partnersgroup.com

Partners Group Holding AG is a Swiss-based global private equity firm with US$185 billion in assets under management in private equity, private infrastructure, private real estate, private debt and royalties.

The firm manages a broad range of funds, structured products and customised portfolios for an international clientele of institutional investors, private banks, individual investors and other financial institutions. The firm has completed more than 250 private equity investments in portfolio companies. In 2020, Partners Group became a constituent of the Swiss Market Index, an index of the 20 largest stocks in Switzerland.

== History ==
=== Early history (1996-2010) ===
Partners Group was co-founded in 1996 by Urs Wietlisbach, Marcel Erni and Alfred Gantner in Zug, Switzerland. Each of the co-founders contributed an equal share to the initial pool in the first year. In the firm's second year it had its first major milestone, launching a US$150 million small & midcap fund focused on investments in German-speaking Europe. The fund was a huge success in continental Europe. According to Institutional Investor magazine, this is partly due to the lack of competition at the time in Europe compared to North America. In the same article, co-founder Alfred Gantner stated “you had to explain the term to people because ‘private equity’ in the way we understand it today did not exist, it was called Risikokapital, risk capital, which was associated with venture capital.”

In 1998, it completed a secondary transaction involving the private equity portfolio of Royal Dutch Shell’s U.S. pension fund for US$265 million. At the time, it was the largest secondary transaction recorded. In 2002, Partners Group was an early investor in Esmertec, a Java client software maker. Partners Group is a joint stock company under Swiss law, listed on the Swiss Exchange since its 2006 initial public offering (minority floating). Around 45% of the shares are held by employees and partners. As of 2016, according to Forbes' annual billionaire's list, founders Gantner, Erni, and Wietlisbach are listed as three of the 25 wealthiest private equity managers in the world, each with net worths totaling $1.3 billion. Since 2001, Partners Group has pioneered evergreen funds in private markets and launched the first European Long Term Investment Fund (ELTIF) in 2017.

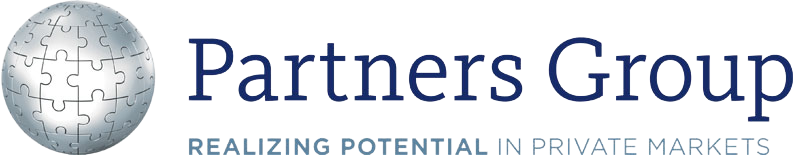
The investment firm's original logo dating back to the 1990s

By 2005, Partners Group had $6 billion in assets under management, and was benefitting from the growing private equity industry. The Financial Times reported that private equity funds had raised $60 billion in first half of 2005 compared with $90 billion for the whole of 2004, demonstrating a growing demand for private equity. Wietlisbach was quoted stating he saw continued growth in the industry as "generalist funds will struggle to attract new money." Partners Group reported in its 2007 annual report that the firm had undergone a period of rapid expansion over the previous 24 months. During that time, it has more than doubled its assets under management, employee numbers and its annual net profit figure. As an early investor in Swiss-based semi-conductor manufacturer u-blox, Partners Group benefitted when the company announced it would be going public by the end of 2007.

On February 6, 2009, Partners Group announced that Peter Wuffli would be joining its board of directors. Wuffli had previously served as CEO UBS AG until 2007. Partners Group launched the Private Equity Master Fund in 2009. The fund was one of the first to meet the requirements of the Investment Company Act of 1940, and one of the first SEC-regulated funds available in the United States. Since its launch, the fund has consistently remained as largest entrant in this sector with US$16 billion in assets in 2024. According to the firm's 2010 Annual Report, total assets under management grew from €17.3 billion in 2009 to €21.4 billion in 2010.

=== International growth (2011-20) ===
As of 30 November 2011, Partners Group has been included in the MSCI Switzerland Index, after having been included in mid-September in the Swiss Small & Mid Cap Index (SMIM Index), which tracks the 30 biggest listed companies in Switzerland that are not listed by the Swiss Market Index.

At Private Equity International's 2012 awards, Partners Group were standout winners at the awards ceremony, as they were the only firm to win three categories. During the same year, Partners Group announced it was investing an undisclosed amount in solar panel production company, RioGlass. In July 2013, Partners Group announced the planned appointment of Christoph Rubeli and André Frei as co-CEOs, replacing Steffen Meister who had held the role since 2005. Meister would remain at Partners Group as a full-time executive member of its board of directors. In 2014, Partners Group announced that it had closed its third direct investment fund at its hard cap of €1.5 billion. Later that year, Partners Group and Duke Street Capital joined forces to acquire Voyage Care for £375 million, a specialist support company based in the UK. The Wall Street Journal reported the financial firm would likely continue its strategic focus on buyouts. It also held its first investor conference in the United States during the same year. Partners Group expanded its real estate portfolio in 2015 with a number of purchases in the United States and also in London. In London it acquired the 80 Fenchurch Street site next to Aldgate tube station, with plans to construct a 245,000sq ft office building in a joint venture with Marick Real Estate. This was after the firm brought the 0.6-acre site out of receivership earlier that year for over £50 million. In the US, hotels in New York and Tennessee were acquired, along with land in California. The United States real estate deals totalled US$163 million. In February 2016, Partners Group acquired Australia-based childcare firm Guardian Early Learning in a deal worth $440million.

In January 2018, Royal Dutch Shell purchased the company's 44% minority interest in solar energy firm Silicon Ranch for an estimated $200 million. Around the same time, Partners Group continued with its efforts to invest in green technology companies by investing in the Borssele Offshore Wind Farm project off the coast of the Netherlands. It acquired a 45% stake in the wind farm. Partners Group continued with acquisitions throughout 2018, including two other major deals. The first was German smart metre business Techem followed by Megadyne SpA and Ammeraal Beltech Holding BV. In August, it was announced that Christoph Rubeli would be stepping down from his role as co-CEO, and would be replaced by David Layton. The firm continued with its co-CEO model, with André Frei remaining as the firm's other co-CEO. Layton's role at the time was as senior manager at the firm's Denver office, and became Partners Group's first American chief executive officer. Bloomberg reported in October 2018 that the firm was seeking to raise a reported $5.8 billion for its fourth buyout fund.

In 2019, the former UK Prime Minister and chancellor Gordon Brown was announced as an advisor to Partners Group. His role would be to advise the private equity firm on impact investments. During the same year, Partners Group announced it was acquiring a majority stake in United States-based optometry specialist EyeCare Partners in a USD$2.2 billion deal. In 2020, Partners Group was awarded Firm of the Year in Switzerland for the fourth consecutive year (previously 2017, 2018 and 2019) by Private Equity International. Partners Group entered into a major cooperation with UBS in the form of a new private markets solution for its wealth management clients, targeting an annual investment capacity of US$1‐3 billion over time. During the same year, MidRail accused Partners Group of violating a non-disclosure agreement, which allegedly impacted the bidding process for acquisition target Patriot Rail. The case was closed in October 2023, after Partners Group and MidRail mutually agreed to dismiss their claims against each other. September 2020 saw Partners Group join the Swiss Market Index (SMI), with its first day of trading on 21 September. The SMI contains the 20 largest Swiss stocks, and is the most prominent stock index in Switzerland. It was Partners Group's first time listed on the index.

=== Recent history (2021-present) ===
In 2021, Partners Group was selected by Malaysia's Employees Provident Fund to manage a substantial portion of its US$600 million Shariah Private Equity Direct/Co-Investment Fund - the largest of its kind in the world. In September 2021, the firm announced that it had raised $15 billion for a private equity program. At the time of the announcement, $6 billion of the total had been invested to acquire stakes in 17 companies. Partners Group led a consortium in the biggest Swiss 2022 venture capital investment in cleantech company Climeworks, the world's largest direct air capture and storage plant. Also in 2022, Partners Group invested USD 500 million in Budderfly, an energy-as-a-service company that provides energy efficient systems to businesses. The Connecticut-based energy company served 2,750 clients across the United States at the time of the investment. In November 2022, Partners Group acquired EdgeCore for $1.2 billion, a Colorado-based data center owner and operator company. In December, Partners Group announced that it was increasing its stake in the Swiss watchmaker, Breitling. It previously had a 23% stake in Breitling and would become the majority shareholder once the deal was completed. Breitling at the time was valued at USD 4.5 billion. Co-founder of Partners Group, Alfred Gantner, also became President of Breitling's directorial board. Breitling re-entered the list of top 10 Swiss brands after it posted its 2022 revenue figures. Also in 2022, Partners Group bought U.S. heating, ventilation and air conditioning parts maker DiversiTech. In the same year, Partners Group acquired Version 1, a digital transformation company from Dublin. Partners Group also announced an investment of US$400 Million in an Indian renewable energy platform Sunsure Energy in December 2022. The capital infusion will help the company transform into a next generation independent power company with assest in utility scale solar, wind, solar-wind hybrid and battery storage renewable energy projects offering round theh clock (RTC) energy solution.

On January 4, 2023, Partners Group announced that they had acquired SureWerx, a Canadian-American supplier of PPE, safety gear, and tools. They acquired SureWerx from Riverside Partners. In April, Partners Group continued its focus on decarbonisation, when it agreed to buy 7,000 credits generated by Climeworks’ direct air capture (DAC) facilities. The firm entered into a partnership with Canadian-based Bank of Montreal (BMO) to launch a private assets fund for smaller investors. The fund is aimed at Canadian retail investors as well as smaller institutional clients. In November 2023, Partners Group acquired ROSEN Group, an inspection and integrity management services provider for energy transmission pipelines, for an undisclosed amount. In December 2023, Partners Group acquired Velvet CARE, one of the leading European manufacturers of hygiene paper products.

In March 2024, the firm added private markets royalties to its investment platform, launching the industry's first scalable multi-sector royalty strategy. The new offering would target a fast-growing addressable market, with royalties representing the fifth asset class on Partners Group's private markets platform. During the same month, the investment firm launched its new corporate brand with new logo and slogan, 'Built Differently to Build Differently.' The new logo incorporates bricks into its design, underlining the firm's focus as a business builder. In May, the firm announced it was expanding its ELTIF solutions with the launch of a private equity evergreen strategy. The firm also expanded geographically during the same period, opening a new office in Hong Kong.

In July of that year, it was announced Partners Group would be acquiring a majority share in the Portuguese biotech firm, FairJourney Biologics. Prior to the deal, FairJourney had assisted drugmakers including Johnson & Johnson discover novel antibody treatments. During the same month, it also closed its fifth private equity fund above its $15 billion target. Also in July, the company announced it was set to acquire Eteck, a market-leading provider of sustainable decentralised heating and cooling solutions in the Netherlands. In September 2024, Partners Group and BlackRock announced they had established a strategic partnership to launch a model portfolio solution streamlining retail wealth access to private equity, private credit, and real assets. The first-of-its-kind offering will enable advisors to deliver a one-stop multi-private markets portfolio managed by two global asset managers, positioning BlackRock and Partners Group to capture accelerating growth in private markets and managed models. The AuM in managed model portfolios is expected to grow rapidly in the next few years. In the same month, Partners Group successfully completed a USD 1.9 billion equity investment in portfolio company Edgecore Digital Infrastructure. The investment is the second equity capital raise that Partners Group led since acquiring EdgeCore in 2022 and was conducted in conjunction with the firm's clients. It also acquired a controlling stake in Gateway Fleets, a provider of electrification solutions for logistics fleet operators in the United States. In September 2024, the company announced it would sell Techem, an international provider of digitally enabled solutions for the building ecosystem.

In October, Partners Group was named as the Best Liquid Alternatives Manager by Citywire Asia in its 2024 Asset Management Awards. They were also part of a consortium which backed Australian startup Neara's $31 million Series C funding round. Neara’s digital modeling technology enables utilities to adopt a more proactive approach to network optimization, with simulations that surface safety and reliability risks and identify the most effective remediation actions.

Partners Group ended 2024 by acquiring Empira Group, a real estate operator, developer, and investor with a portfolio valued at EUR 14 billion. Around the same time, the private-markets firm announced it was expanding its growth equity strategy, targeting fast-growing companies in the technology and healthcare sectors. The expansion followed the firm investing USD 2.5 billion in the space to date. Partners Group also opened an infrastructure fund to Canadian investors through a partnership with iCapital. It also sold its controlling stake in renewable energy company VSB Group to TotalEnergies in a deal valued at EUR 2 billion. Partners Group finished 2024 with one of the largest deals in Indian private equity that calendar year, listing Vishal Mega Mart on the National Stock Exchange and Bombay Stock Exchange. The firm's private equity secondary investments team finished the year having invested US$3.2 billion across different opportunities, up from US$1.5 billion the previous year. Throughout 2024, Partners Group secured $22 billion in new commitments from clients.

At the end of January 2025, Partners Group received approval from the UK financial services regulator to launch a long-term asset fund (LTAF). In March 2025, the private equity firm announced it was acquiring Australian-based GreenSquareDC, investing up to AU$1.2 billion (approximately US$759 million). The datacentre company operates strategic locations in Sydney, Melbourne and Perth, with demand rising rapidly due to increased demand from generative AI and cloud usage. Remaining with a focus on tech investments, during the same month Partners Group co-led a $140 million investment in Indian startup, Darwinbox. The AI-powered human resource management platform was founded in 2015, with clients including Starbucks, Nivea, and AXA.

Partners Group published its annual results for 2024 in March 2025, with CEO David Layton stating the private equity firm aimed to triple its assets to $450 billion by 2033. The firm concluded the month announcing a partnership with Lincoln Financial, with Lincoln offering private-market funds to individual investors via its 60,000 financial advisers. Partners Group also sold its stake in Greenlink for €1bn, and acquired California-based Middle River Power for $2.2 billion. In May, the firm launched an evergreen royalties fund for individuals in Asia, Europe, and the Middle East. It aims for a 10% net return, investing in a diverse range of sectors including pharmaceuticals, energy transition, and sports. After developing one of the first private equity funds specifically tailored for 401(k)s in 2015, Partners Group continued to lobby government officials to support the inclusion of private equity in retirement savings in 2025. As part of this move, Partners Group announced a groundbreaking partnership with Empower, the second-largest retirement plan provider in the United States. The partnership would give Empower 401(k) participants access to private market investments with the PE firm. As a major shareholder in Green Tea Group, Partners Group saw the restaurant chain go public on the Hong Kong stock exchange, raising HK$1.21 billion in the process. During the same month, the firm also acquired Singapore-based Digital Halo its existing shareholders. Digital Halo added to its existing portfolio of data centres.

In September 2025, Deutsche Bank launched private markets fund for private clients in partnership with DWS Group and Partners Group.

In February 2026, Partners Group announced the sale of atNorth with an enterprise value of $4 billion. While the initial purchase price was undisclosed, the deal represented a 2.5x multiple on the capital invested. In mid-2026, Partners Group imposed a redemption limit on a single European-domiciled evergreen fund, which accounted for less than 5% of assets under management at the firm. This came during a period of wider redemption pressure in private markets, with other major private equity firms experiencing similar trading conditions. Partners Group's institutional investor base, which represents around 80% of the firm's clients, remained unaffected. Around a similar period, the company re-confirmed it expected new client demand of between $26 to $32 billion for 2026, demonstrating a healthy fundraising pipeline. In April 2026, Partners Group invested further equity in its portfolio company North Star to enable it to acquire four new offshore wind service operation vessels. The acquisition significantly increased the size of North Star's fleet. Across the first half of 2026, Partners Group also launched two new investment strategies, a special opportunities strategy and a total return strategy, which is focused on lower leverage, income-generating investments.

In mid‑2026, Partners Group reported record fundraising in the first half of the year. The company posted inflows of $16 billion, bringing assets under management (AuM) to $186 billion.

In September 2026, it was announced that Roberto Cagnati and Juri Jenkner would become the firm's new Co-Chief Executive Officers, effective from January 1, 2027. Cagnati and Jenker both joined Partners Group in 2004. Jenker had previously held the role of President and Head of Business Development, while Cagnati was the firm's Chief Risk Officer and Head of Portfolio Solutions. Layton, who had been CEO since 2019, would move to a new role at the firm as Chief Investment Officer.

== Operations ==
=== Headquarters & offices ===
Partners Group was founded and is still based in Zug, Switzerland, with operational locations in Asia, Europe and North America. Beginning in late 2004, Partners Group made a number of announcements about the opening of new global offices. This began with the Asia Pacific region, with the opening of an office in Singapore in December 2004. In March 2005, the investment firm opened its first UK-based office in London due to its growing investor base in the region. The firm expanded its presence in Asia with the opening of its Japanese office in the country's capital Tokyo in 2007.

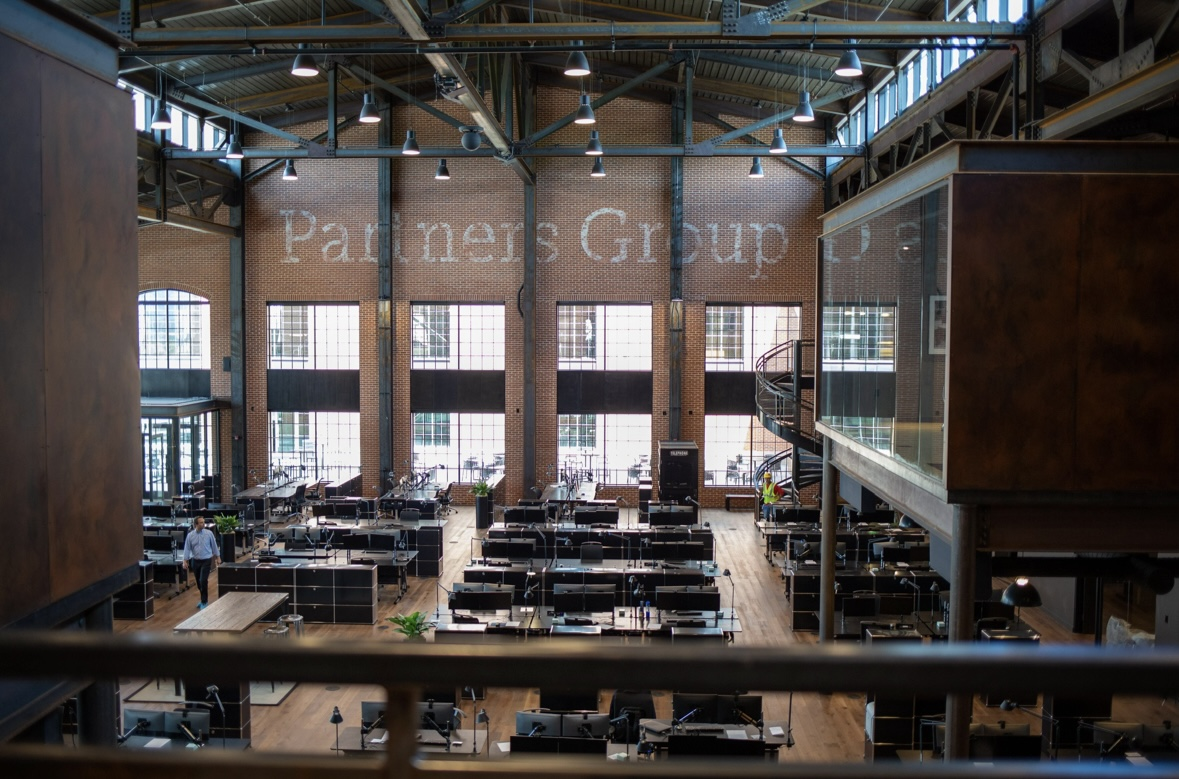
North American headquarters

In June 2019, the firm opened its 129,400-square-foot North American headquarters in Broomfield, Colorado. In November 2024, Partners Group opened the doors to its new Zug campus. It will serve as the firm's global headquarters and comprises three interconnected buildings: The Foundry, The Factory and The Greenery. In 2025, the firm opened a new regional headquarters in Abu Dhabi, along with offices in Montreal and Miami. In 2026, Partners Group announced plans to open an office in Kuwait, further strengthening its presence in the GCC region.

=== Management ===
Partners Group was managed during its early history by the three co-founders, Marcel Erni, Alfred Gantner and Urs Wietlisbach. In more recent years, the founders have all remained as large shareholders and board members, but the day-to-day management is done by the Executive Team. In the late 90s, the three founders introduced a number of changes to boost team morale. This included a one-month paid sabbatical every five years for employees to recharge and regular hikes up Wildspitz, located close to the Partners Group's Zug office. In 2021, its CEO Dave Layton received media coverage for banning the word "deal," a move which Layton believed could reduce the transactional mindset often associated with private equity. Senior management that broke the rule, would be asked to donate $1,000.

In 2023, Executive Chairman Steffen Meister documented the ongoing role reversal between private and public markets. In the white paper, Meister was quoted saying real value creation is rarely about big M&A transactions. Instead, it is about organic growth, platform-building, and research and development. Robert Collins, Co-Head of Private Wealth at Partners Group, spoke about the growing need for tailored investments for individual investors.

During the same year, Pensions & Investments magazine ran an article about Partners Group and its early adoption of generative AI and how the move was supported by senior executives.
