= Converium =

Swiss insurance company

Converium Holding AG
- Industry: reinsurance
- Founded: 1995
- Defunct: 2007
- Fate: acquired by SCOR SE
- Headquarters: France

Converium Holding AG was a company that primarily provided reinsurance products in Europe, Asia, the Middle East, and Latin America through its parent holding company and through various subsidiaries. It was founded in 1995.

== Products ==
It offered a variety of life and non-life reinsurance lines including most standard liability products and some special liability products including worker's compensation. It also offered many life and health insurance lines.

The company maintained an alliance with the Medical Defence Union to support their business concerns.

== Ratings ==
The company suffered a series of downgrades in 2004, despite good business performance. The company lashed out at ratings agencies saying that the downgrades "harmed our franchise".

In 2007 the company was purchased by Scor, after becoming the target of a hostile takeover in February. Martin Ebner, together with the Zürcher Kantonalbank, helped the French reinsurer Scor to build up a position of almost 33 percent with a controversial option deal and contributed to Converium's management collapsing in its defensive struggle.
