= Royalty fund =

A royalty fund (also known as royalty funding) is a category of private equity fund that specializes in purchasing consistent revenue streams deriving from the payment of royalties. Royalties are a usage-based payment from one individual or entity to another individual or entity, giving the right to use an asset, product, service or idea.

One growing subset of this category is the healthcare royalty fund, in which a private equity fund manager purchases a royalty stream paid by a pharmaceutical company to a patent holder. The patent holder can be another company, an individual inventor, or some sort of institution, such as a research university.

== Structure of Royalty Investments ==
Royalty funds are a specific type of income trust, used for special-purpose finance, created to hold investments or cash flow in operating companies. These funds are not stocks or bonds but a form of investment fund. A royalty fund raises capital in order to purchase the right to a royalty of a product or service. However, unlike many other corporate entities, the profits derived from royalties are not taxed on a corporate level, but are distributed to shareholders in the form of a dividend, which is taxed on the personal income level. By doing so it avoids double taxation, enabling higher returns on dividends, thus making royalty funds an attractive investment.

Royalty funds are structured in a number of ways. A fund can purchase a royalty or a percentage of a royalty from researchers at a university or a corporate entity for examples a biotech firm, therefore exchanging capital for ownership of the royalty. Alternatively, the fund can act as a private equity vehicle, extending debt or making loans, in exchange for a proportion of the royalty or securing other assets from the institution as collateral. Investments may go to fund a research project or cover costs of a research project. Royalty funds invest in a range of business areas, including, mining, commodities, energy, entertainment, franchise, patents and IP, pharmaceuticals, and other trademark royalties.

An example would be a company making an investment into a pharmaceutical company through the acquisition of a healthcare product or service royalty. The operation of the pharmaceutical company continues, as usual, manufacturing and distribution of the products or services. But once the product has been sold a proportion of the profits will go to the fund that purchased the royalty (the amount or percentage will vary between companies based on the acquisition/investment terms).

Another example would be the purchase of royalties in the oil and gas industry, where the rights oil wells, oil mines or oil fields are owned by a royalty fund or also known as royalty trust. Other companies perform the operational aspect of extracting the minerals, paying a “royalty” in order to extract them.

== Examples ==
Intangible asset finance deals with the financing of intangible assets such as patents, trademarks, intellectual property, reputations, etc. In 2003, the intangible assets economy of the U.S. was estimated at $5 trillion.

- Royalty Pharma: (investing in top therapeutics, typically billion dollar blockbusters products.)
- PDL BioPharma: (investing mainly in antibody humanization patents and license agreements in different biotechnology and pharmaceutical companies.)
- Permian Basin Royalty Trust: (leading royalty trust in oil and natural gas, with a market cap of US $790,000,000).

=== History and Significant transactions ===
- David Bowie issued Bowie Bonds on future royalty revenues derived from 25 albums recorded before 1990.
- In 2000 PDL BioPharma completed a $115 million deal for a single patent from Yale University. The patent claims to cover Stavudine, a nucleoside analog reverse-transcriptase (NARTI) active against HIV. This was the first acquisition ever made of one whole single pharmaceutical patent.
- In 2005 UCC Capital Corporation securitization of BDBG generating property right revenues of roughly $53 million. First to be recognized as a “whole company securitization” containing primarily intangible assets.
- 2005 also included the first ever-live Intellectual Property (IP) auction. Launched by Ocean Tomo, the aim was to speed up patent deals by bringing together patent buyers and sellers in a single venue. Its tremendous success monetarily has resulted in further developments, including an online platform, Royalty Exchange where property rights/patents can be sold and bought.
- In 2014 Royalty Pharma acquired the royalty stream promised to the Cystic Fibrosis Foundation by Vertex Pharmaceuticals on sales of the drug, Kalydeco, for $3.3 billion; the CFF had invested in discovery and development of the drug under the venture philanthropy model, and said it intended to use proceeds from the royalty sale to further invest in treatments for cystic fibrosis.
