= Caroline Scheufele =

Swiss businesswoman

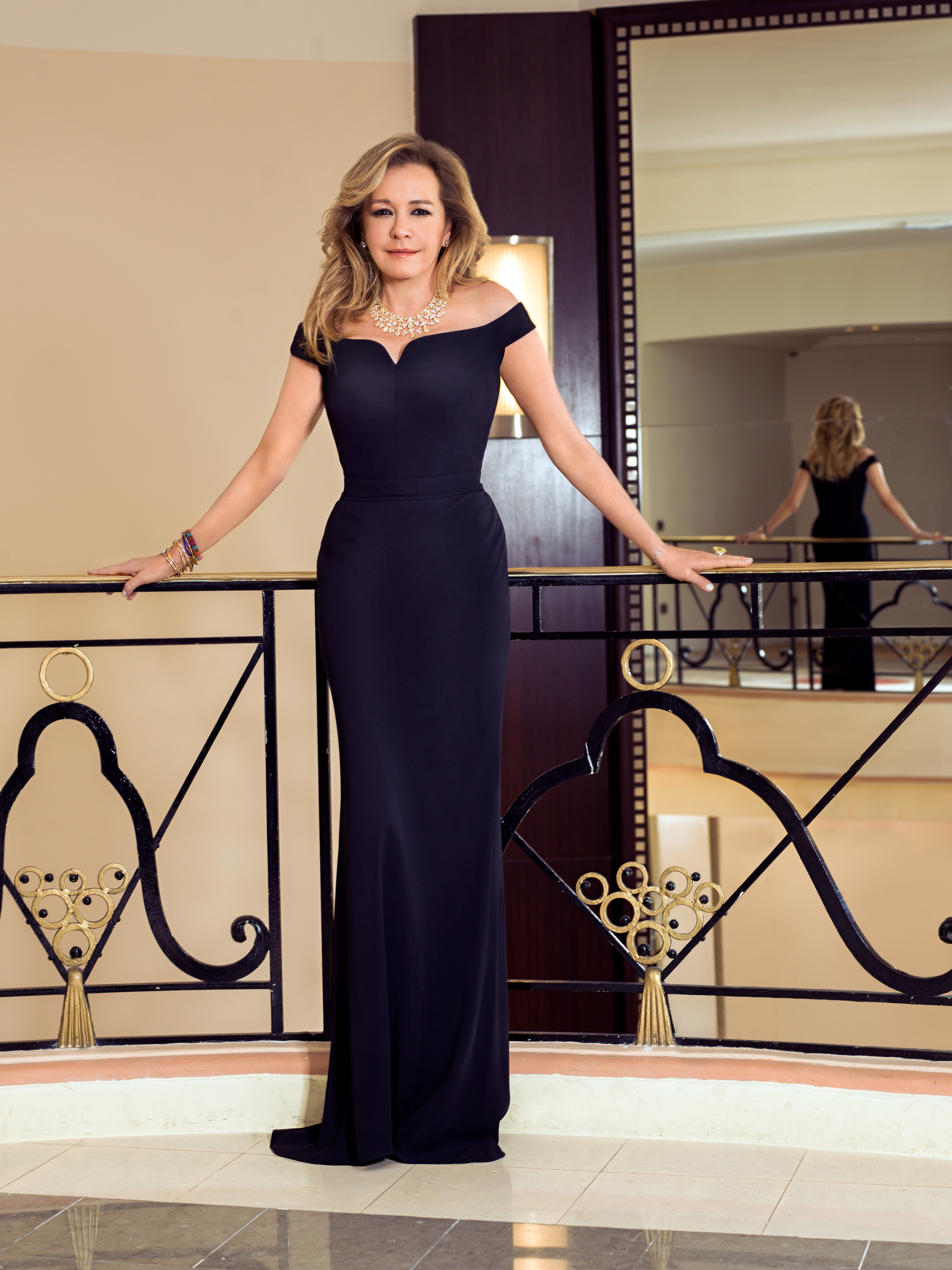
- Born: 14 December 1961 (age 64); Pforzheim, Germany
- Education: International School of Geneva (Ecolint)
- Occupation: Co-President of Chopard
- Relatives: Karl-Friedrich Scheufele

Caroline Scheufele (born 14 December 1961) is a German-Swiss businesswoman. She is the artistic director and co-president of Chopard, Scheufele is the daughter of Karl and Karin Scheufele, German entrepreneurs who purchased the company in 1963.

== Early life and education ==
Caroline Scheufele was born in Pforzheim in Germany. Her parents managed the watchmaking company Eszeha, based in Pforzheim. In 1963, her father Karl acquired the Geneva-based watch manufacturer Chopard, and over the following years, the family traveled back and forth between Germany and Switzerland.

== Career ==
Scheufele joined the family business after obtaining her diploma, while enrolled in classes in Design and Gemmology.

In 1985, she designed an articulated clown made of floating diamonds.Her father put the piece into production. The clown was the first piece of jewelry made by Chopard and marked the company's launch into this sector.

In 1997, Scheufele redesigned the Palme d"Or, one of the awards of the Cannes film festival.

In 2001, Caroline Scheufele and her brother Karl-Friedrich were named co-presidents of the company.

Scheufele is also in charge of international retail.

She has established partnerships with several charitable organizations.

Under the direction of Scheufele, Chopard has become one of the first brands to use raw materials that meet higher than usual social and environmental standards, and supports Fairmined certified responsible gold.
