= Emil Frey Group =

Swiss automotive retailer, founded 1924

- 100th anniversary logo used in 2024
- Native name: Emil Frey Gruppe
- Industry: Automotive, Auto Dealerships, Vehicle Parts, Transportation Services, Commercial Vehicles, Commercial Vehicle Dealerships, Truck Parts & Services
- Founded: 1924; 102 years ago in Zürich, Switzerland
- Founder: Emil Frey
- Key people: Walter Frey (Chairman); Gerhard Schürmann (CEO)
- Number of employees: 22,000+ (2019)
- Subsidiaries: Emil Frey Racing
- Website: emilfrey.ch (Switzerland)

Emil Frey Group (officially Emil Frey Holding AG) is a Swiss automotive retailer based in Zürich, Switzerland. Founded in 1924, the company operates several multinational companies which provide new and pre-owned vehicles and associated services in Switzerland, Germany, the Netherlands, Serbia, Croatia, Hungary, Poland, Belgium, Luxembourg, Czech Republic, Slovenia and France. As of 2023, the group has been Europe's leading car dealer.

The group employs 22,000+ people and has an annual turn over of roughly 11 billion Swiss Francs (2019). The company remains family-owned and chaired by Walter Frey (born 1943), the son of the founder of the group.
