= Karl-Friedrich Scheufele =

Swiss businessman

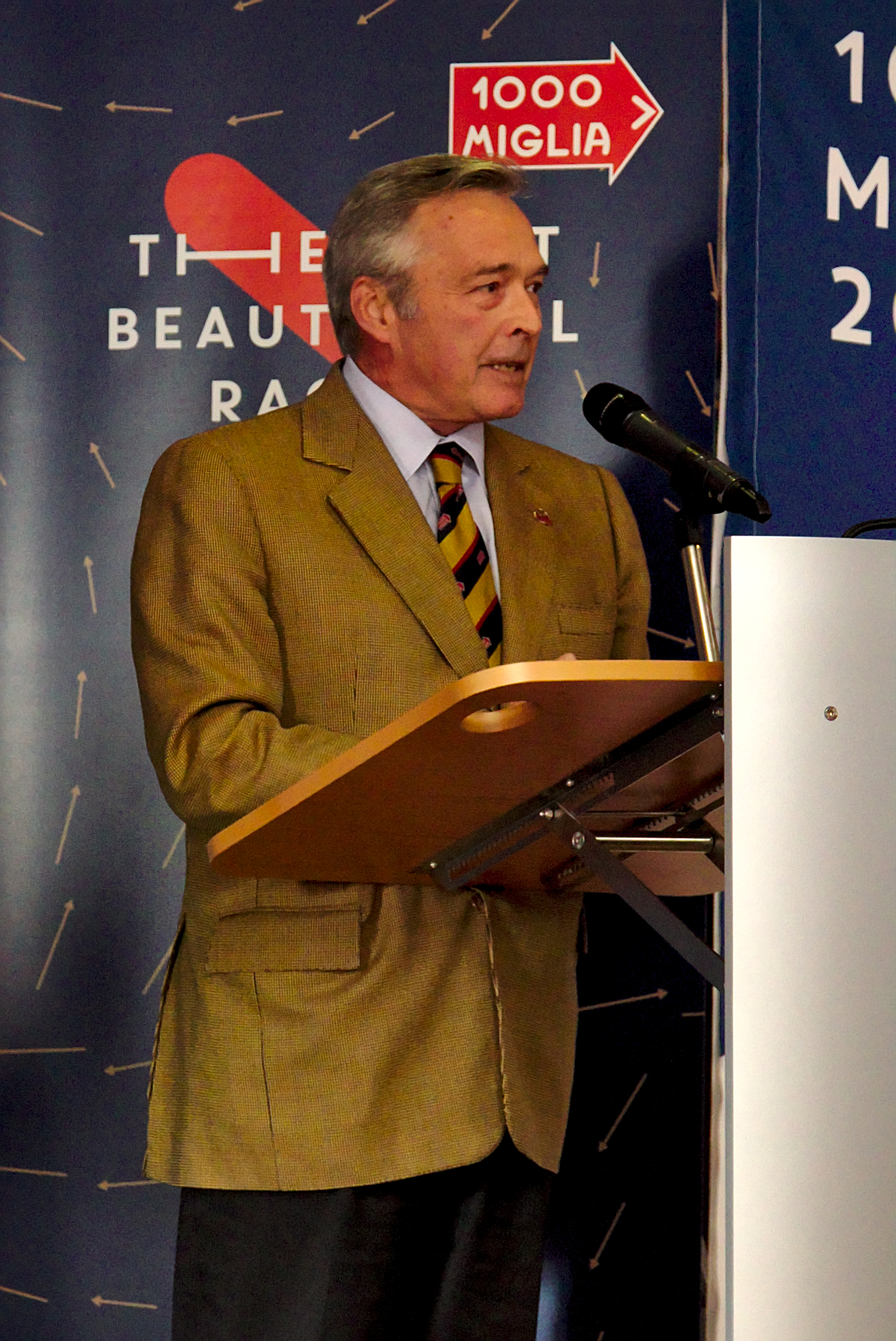
- Born: 5 February 1958 (age 68); Pforzheim, Germany
- Education: International School of Geneva (Ecolint); Faculty of Business and Economics (Lausanne)
- Occupations: Co-President of Chopard; President of La Chronométrie Ferdinand Berthoud
- Relatives: Caroline Scheufele (sister)

Karl-Friedrich Scheufele (born 5 February 1958 in Pforzheim) is co-president of Chopard along with his sister, Caroline, and president of La Chronométrie Ferdinand Berthoud. He is the son of Karl and Karin Scheufele, German entrepreneurs who acquired Chopard in 1963. In 2005, he established the Fleurier Quality Foundation, an independent Swiss watch certification body, and he founded the L.U.C.EUM watch museum in Fleurier a year later.

He set up a wine sales company, La Galerie des Arts du Vin, at the end of the 1990s and acquired a number of Caveaux de Bacchus boutiques in Switzerland. In 2012, he bought the Château Monestier-la-Tour wine estate, which produces 150,000 bottles per year in a variety of AOPs in France.

== Early life ==
Karl-Friedrich Scheufele was born in 1958 in Pforzheim and lived there until the age of 15. His parents were at the head of watchmaking company Eszeha, based in Pforzheim.

In 1963, his father, Karl, took over the Geneva-based watch manufacturer Chopard.

== Career ==
Karl-Friedrich Scheufele joined Chopard in the 1980s.

Later, he founded a manufacturer dedicated to the production of high precision mechanical movements. Chopard Manufacture was inaugurated in 1996 in Fleurier in the Val-de-Travers.

In 2001, Scheufele and his sister became Co-Presidents of the company. Karl-Friedrich Scheufele and Michel Parmigiani jointly set up the Fleurier Quality Foundation, an independent watch certification body. In 2006, Karl-Friedrich Scheufele inaugurated the L.U.CEUM watchmaking museum in Fleurier.

In 2006, he acquired the Ferdinand Berthoud brand. He registered the trade name under Chronométrie Ferdinand Berthoud in 2013 and launched it in 2015.

In 1996, Scheufele founded a wine sales company, La Galerie des Arts du Vin. Three years later, he bought the Caveau de Bacchus boutique and opened several boutiques across Switzerland.

In 2012, Karl-Friedrich Scheufele bought the Château Monestier-la-Tour in France, a wine estate in the region of Bergerac.
