= Alfred Gantner =

Swiss billionaire, businessman and political activist

- Born: Alfred Gantner; 1968 (age 57–58); Baden, Aargau, Switzerland
- Occupations: Businessman, political activist, philanthropist
- Known for: Co-founder, Partners Group
- Spouse: Cornelia Bose (m. 1991)
- Children: 5

Alfred "Fredy" Gantner (born 1968) is a Swiss billionaire businessman, philanthropist and political activist.

In 1996, aged 28, he co-founded Partners Group, a multinational private equity firm, with $152 billion in assets under management (2025). Gantner owns about 5% of controlling interest and currently is on the board of directors. He also chairs PG3 Ltd., the private multi-family office of the founders of Partners Group.

He is a member of the National Advisory Council of Brigham Young University in Provo, Utah since 2003. As of February 2023, his net worth is estimated at $2.6 billion by Forbes.

== Education and profession ==
Gantner completed a banking apprenticeship at the former UBS subsidiary Cantrade Privatbank. He holds an MBA from the Brigham Young University Marriott School of Management in Utah, United States. After his studies in the U.S., he completed internships at Bankers Trust and at Goldman Sachs.

In 1996, he founded Partners Group together with Marcel Erni and Urs Wietlisbach, whom he had previously met at Goldman Sachs. Gantner was its CEO between 1996 and 2005, and its chairman of the board of directors between 2005 and 2014. In the meantime, he is a simple member of the board of directors and still holds 5.01% of the shares of Partners Group Holding AG, according to the company.

In December 2022, Gantner became chairman of Breitling SA.

== Political involvement ==
In 2020, it became known that Gantner would become involved against the EU-Switzerland framework agreement. Together with his co-founders at Partners Group, he built up a network of over a hundred entrepreneurs, which, under the name Kompass/Europa, is opposed to the signing of the agreement and in favor of maintaining the current cooperation.

Gantner is non-partisan. After short-term plans to become politically active in the FDP in 2011, he now says he is closest to the CVP.

== Personal life ==
In 1991, Gantner married Cornelia Bose (born 1972), a Swiss citizen of partial Indian origin. They both studied at Brigham Young University and she became a documentary film maker and non profit executive. They have five children.

In 2002, Gantner became involved in public relations for the Salt Lake City Winter Olympics in Switzerland, together with Winterthur entrepreneur Mark Prohaska.

He comes from a Protestant family, but converted at the age of 23 and has been a member of the Mormons ever since. He also served as pastor and bishop of Richterswil for that church for six years. His Compass Switzerland network also includes other members of the church, some of whom are leaders.

He is a resident of Meggen on Lake Lucerne.
