= VZ Holding =

Swiss financial services provider

VZ Holding Ltd.
- Company type: Public limited company (Aktiengesellschaft)
- Traded as: SIX: VZN
- ISIN: CH0528751586
- Industry: Financial services
- Founded: 1993; 33 years ago
- Founders: Matthias Reinhart; Max Bolanz
- Headquarters: Zug, Switzerland
- Area served: Switzerland; Germany
- Key people: Giulio Vitarelli (CEO)
- Revenue: SFr 574 million (2025)
- Number of employees: 1,717 (FTE)
- Website: vermoegenszentrum.ch

VZ Group is a Swiss financial service provider based in Zug. It is known by the name VZ Vermögenszentrum (company's preferred spelling: VZ VermögensZentrum) on the market. Since March 2007, the holding company VZ Holding Ltd is listed on the SIX Swiss Exchange.

Matthias Reinhart has founded VZ Group and is the main shareholder.

== Business orientation ==
According to its own accounts, the group sells neither financial products of its own, nor such by third parties for a commission or kickback payments and should therefore have no conflicts of interests. Clients pay fees for the advisory services and for the management of their assets. The services of VZ Group are targeted predominantly towards individuals and couples aged 50 or above, who wish to prepare for retirement.

== Employees ==
VZ Vermögenszentrum has around 1717 employees (in full-time equivalents) and expands its workforce by around 100 employees per year. In addition, every year the company provides between 30 and 40 apprentices with commercial and informatics training. It furthermore recruits dozens of interns every year. The consultants receive their education in the company's own, edu-certified academy. Every year, more than 50 trainees begin their education programme, which lasts several years, in the areas of investment, tax, pension provision, estate, and mortgage financing. Employees of VZ Group are also invited as experts in consumer magazines and TV shows.

== History ==
The company was founded in 1993 by Matthias Reinhart and Max Bolanz under the name of VZ Versicherungszentrum AG. Their aim was to bring transparency to Switzerland’s insurance and banking industries by providing price and service comparisons. The initial purpose of the company was the brokerage of insurance contracts.

In 1997, together with the company's name change to VZ VermögensZentrum AG, the articles of association were amended. From then on, the focus was shifted from insurance to advisory services in finance and asset management. The service scope has subsequently been increasing on an ongoing basis and further fields of business have been added. Today, the financial service provider advises private individuals in the areas of retirement, tax, investment, mortgages, estate, and insurance. For institutional clients, VZ Group provides assistance with pension fund solutions, corporate succession, and the management of insurance policies.

In 2000, a holding structure was introduced. Today, VZ Group comprises 15 legally independent companies. They include a.o. Hypothekenzentrum AG, VZ Versicherungszentrum AG, VZ Vorsorge AG, and VZ Depository Bank Ltd.

In March 2007, the latter was authorised as a bank and securities dealer by the Swiss Federal Banking Commission. In the same month, VZ Holding Ltd went public.

In 2000, VZ Group expanded into Germany, where the previously separate units VZ VermögensZentrum and VZ Depotbank Deutschland were merged to VZ VermögensZentrum Bank AG. Like its Swiss counterpart, the public limited company holds a banking licence. In addition, VZ Group acquired a majority stake at the London-based financial advisory company Lumin Wealth Ltd. In doing so, VZ Vermögenszentrum entered the market in Great Britain.
