= List of minor planets: 282001–283000 =

The following is a partial list of minor planets, running from minor-planet number 282001 through 283000, inclusive. The primary data for this and other partial lists is based on JPL's "Small-Body Orbital Elements" and data available from the Minor Planet Center. Critical list information is also provided by the MPC, unless otherwise specified from Lowell Observatory. A detailed description of the table's columns and additional sources are given on the main page including a complete list of every page in this series, and a statistical break-up on the dynamical classification of minor planets.

Also see the summary list of all named bodies in numerical and alphabetical order, and the corresponding naming citations for the number range of this particular list. New namings may only be added to this list after official publication, as the preannouncement of names is condemned by the Working Group for Small Bodies Nomenclature of the International Astronomical Union.

Near-Earth obj.	MBA (inner)	MBA (outer)	Centaur
Mars-crosser	MBA (middle)	Jupiter trojan	Trans-Neptunian obj.
Unclassified

== 282001–282100 ==
Designation			Discovery			Properties		Ref
Permanent	Provisional	Named after	Date	Site	Discoverer(s)	Category	Diam.	Ref
282001	2011 HO_{44}	—	May 4, 2006	Mount Lemmon	Mount Lemmon Survey	·	4.8 km	MPC · JPL
282002	2011 HA_{49}	—	March 17, 2005	Kitt Peak	Spacewatch	·	3.7 km	MPC · JPL
282003	2011 HG_{49}	—	March 16, 2005	Catalina	CSS	·	3.8 km	MPC · JPL
282004	2011 HY_{49}	—	April 9, 2003	Kitt Peak	Spacewatch	·	1.0 km	MPC · JPL
282005	2011 HS_{52}	—	February 7, 2002	Palomar	NEAT	·	4.1 km	MPC · JPL
282006	2011 HZ_{55}	—	November 1, 1999	Kitt Peak	Spacewatch	·	2.6 km	MPC · JPL
282007	2011 HJ_{56}	—	November 8, 2008	Mount Lemmon	Mount Lemmon Survey	·	3.3 km	MPC · JPL
282008	2011 HV_{57}	—	May 5, 2002	Palomar	NEAT	EUN	2.1 km	MPC · JPL
282009	2011 HR_{58}	—	July 24, 2003	Palomar	NEAT	·	2.5 km	MPC · JPL
282010	2011 HL_{61}	—	January 22, 2006	Catalina	CSS	·	4.7 km	MPC · JPL
282011	2011 HF_{64}	—	March 10, 2005	Mount Lemmon	Mount Lemmon Survey	·	2.5 km	MPC · JPL
282012	2011 HF_{66}	—	October 9, 2002	Kitt Peak	Spacewatch	VER	3.3 km	MPC · JPL
282013	2011 HH_{66}	—	January 18, 2004	Kitt Peak	Spacewatch	·	4.2 km	MPC · JPL
282014	2011 HA_{67}	—	May 25, 2003	Kitt Peak	Spacewatch	·	1.4 km	MPC · JPL
282015	2011 HE_{71}	—	December 2, 2004	Catalina	CSS	·	2.8 km	MPC · JPL
282016	2011 HN_{78}	—	April 25, 2007	Mount Lemmon	Mount Lemmon Survey	·	1.8 km	MPC · JPL
282017	2011 HW_{78}	—	October 23, 2003	Kitt Peak	Spacewatch	·	3.1 km	MPC · JPL
282018	2011 HC_{82}	—	March 7, 2003	Needville	J. Dellinger, Dillon, W. G.	MAS	890 m	MPC · JPL
282019	2011 HP_{82}	—	April 10, 2002	Palomar	NEAT	MAR	1.5 km	MPC · JPL
282020	2011 HQ_{82}	—	October 22, 2003	Apache Point	SDSS	EUN	1.8 km	MPC · JPL
282021	2011 HE_{83}	—	August 11, 2001	Palomar	NEAT	·	3.6 km	MPC · JPL
282022	2011 JC_{2}	—	April 25, 2006	Kitt Peak	Spacewatch	·	4.1 km	MPC · JPL
282023	2011 JY_{10}	—	January 22, 2006	Catalina	CSS	·	1.9 km	MPC · JPL
282024	2852 P-L	—	September 24, 1960	Palomar	C. J. van Houten, I. van Houten-Groeneveld, T. Gehrels	·	1.2 km	MPC · JPL
282025	5347 T-2	—	September 30, 1973	Palomar	C. J. van Houten, I. van Houten-Groeneveld, T. Gehrels	·	1.8 km	MPC · JPL
282026	2184 T-3	—	October 16, 1977	Palomar	C. J. van Houten, I. van Houten-Groeneveld, T. Gehrels	·	1.7 km	MPC · JPL
282027	5069 T-3	—	October 16, 1977	Palomar	C. J. van Houten, I. van Houten-Groeneveld, T. Gehrels	·	1.7 km	MPC · JPL
282028	1990 TV_{9}	—	October 10, 1990	Tautenburg	F. Börngen, L. D. Schmadel	·	990 m	MPC · JPL
282029	1993 OH_{3}	—	July 20, 1993	La Silla	E. W. Elst	V	950 m	MPC · JPL
282030	1994 XK_{2}	—	December 1, 1994	Kitt Peak	Spacewatch	·	1.9 km	MPC · JPL
282031	1995 ME_{6}	—	June 24, 1995	Kitt Peak	Spacewatch	EOS	2.0 km	MPC · JPL
282032	1995 OP_{4}	—	July 22, 1995	Kitt Peak	Spacewatch	·	3.2 km	MPC · JPL
282033	1995 OA_{17}	—	July 27, 1995	Kitt Peak	Spacewatch	·	640 m	MPC · JPL
282034 Torinodisangro	1995 UO	Torinodisangro	October 19, 1995	Sormano	Giuliani, V., A. Testa	EUN	2.0 km	MPC · JPL
282035	1995 WG_{18}	—	November 17, 1995	Kitt Peak	Spacewatch	·	1.7 km	MPC · JPL
282036	1996 FQ_{13}	—	March 18, 1996	Kitt Peak	Spacewatch	·	1.1 km	MPC · JPL
282037	1998 QD_{49}	—	August 17, 1998	Socorro	LINEAR	·	2.7 km	MPC · JPL
282038	1998 QO_{79}	—	August 24, 1998	Socorro	LINEAR	·	1.8 km	MPC · JPL
282039	1998 QJ_{89}	—	August 24, 1998	Socorro	LINEAR	JUN	1.6 km	MPC · JPL
282040	1998 QJ_{94}	—	August 17, 1998	Socorro	LINEAR	EUN	2.1 km	MPC · JPL
282041	1998 RT_{54}	—	September 14, 1998	Socorro	LINEAR	JUN	1.6 km	MPC · JPL
282042	1998 SP_{2}	—	September 18, 1998	Socorro	LINEAR	·	2.2 km	MPC · JPL
282043	1998 ST_{106}	—	September 26, 1998	Socorro	LINEAR	·	1.1 km	MPC · JPL
282044	1998 SF_{107}	—	September 26, 1998	Socorro	LINEAR	·	2.2 km	MPC · JPL
282045	1998 VL_{55}	—	November 10, 1998	Caussols	ODAS	·	3.7 km	MPC · JPL
282046	1998 XY_{65}	—	December 14, 1998	Socorro	LINEAR	·	2.7 km	MPC · JPL
282047	1999 FC_{12}	—	March 18, 1999	Kitt Peak	Spacewatch	·	2.3 km	MPC · JPL
282048	1999 JY_{110}	—	May 13, 1999	Socorro	LINEAR	·	2.9 km	MPC · JPL
282049	1999 RE_{66}	—	September 7, 1999	Socorro	LINEAR	·	1.6 km	MPC · JPL
282050	1999 RC_{91}	—	September 7, 1999	Socorro	LINEAR	·	1.0 km	MPC · JPL
282051	1999 RF_{240}	—	September 11, 1999	Anderson Mesa	LONEOS	·	1.5 km	MPC · JPL
282052	1999 SO_{2}	—	September 22, 1999	Socorro	LINEAR	·	3.5 km	MPC · JPL
282053	1999 TO_{18}	—	October 14, 1999	Xinglong	SCAP	·	4.1 km	MPC · JPL
282054	1999 TS_{129}	—	October 6, 1999	Socorro	LINEAR	·	1.4 km	MPC · JPL
282055	1999 TT_{148}	—	October 7, 1999	Socorro	LINEAR	NYS	1.2 km	MPC · JPL
282056	1999 TD_{168}	—	October 10, 1999	Socorro	LINEAR	EUN	1.4 km	MPC · JPL
282057	1999 TH_{193}	—	October 12, 1999	Socorro	LINEAR	·	1.7 km	MPC · JPL
282058	1999 TO_{244}	—	October 7, 1999	Catalina	CSS	EUN ·	3.1 km	MPC · JPL
282059	1999 TE_{255}	—	October 9, 1999	Kitt Peak	Spacewatch	·	1.7 km	MPC · JPL
282060	1999 TT_{265}	—	October 3, 1999	Socorro	LINEAR	·	1.9 km	MPC · JPL
282061	1999 TL_{270}	—	October 3, 1999	Socorro	LINEAR	·	3.7 km	MPC · JPL
282062	1999 UM_{12}	—	October 31, 1999	Kitt Peak	Spacewatch	EUN	1.2 km	MPC · JPL
282063	1999 VJ_{44}	—	November 3, 1999	Catalina	CSS	(194)	2.5 km	MPC · JPL
282064	1999 VT_{50}	—	November 3, 1999	Socorro	LINEAR	·	1.5 km	MPC · JPL
282065	1999 VT_{109}	—	November 9, 1999	Socorro	LINEAR	·	5.2 km	MPC · JPL
282066	1999 WE_{17}	—	November 30, 1999	Kitt Peak	Spacewatch	·	2.8 km	MPC · JPL
282067	1999 XC_{9}	—	December 5, 1999	Socorro	LINEAR	·	2.3 km	MPC · JPL
282068	1999 XH_{17}	—	December 7, 1999	Socorro	LINEAR	H	840 m	MPC · JPL
282069	1999 XN_{24}	—	December 6, 1999	Socorro	LINEAR	EUN	1.9 km	MPC · JPL
282070	1999 XB_{80}	—	December 7, 1999	Socorro	LINEAR	·	2.6 km	MPC · JPL
282071	1999 XE_{155}	—	December 8, 1999	Socorro	LINEAR	·	1.6 km	MPC · JPL
282072	1999 XT_{239}	—	December 7, 1999	Catalina	CSS	·	1.5 km	MPC · JPL
282073	1999 XN_{259}	—	December 5, 1999	Kitt Peak	Spacewatch	·	2.5 km	MPC · JPL
282074	2000 AP_{26}	—	January 3, 2000	Socorro	LINEAR	·	3.0 km	MPC · JPL
282075	2000 CZ_{71}	—	February 7, 2000	Kitt Peak	Spacewatch	·	740 m	MPC · JPL
282076	2000 CC_{73}	—	February 7, 2000	Kitt Peak	Spacewatch	PHO	2.5 km	MPC · JPL
282077	2000 ER_{142}	—	March 3, 2000	Socorro	LINEAR	·	800 m	MPC · JPL
282078	2000 GP_{51}	—	April 5, 2000	Socorro	LINEAR	·	1.4 km	MPC · JPL
282079	2000 HS_{33}	—	April 24, 2000	Anderson Mesa	LONEOS	·	3.6 km	MPC · JPL
282080	2000 LU_{29}	—	June 5, 2000	Kitt Peak	Spacewatch	·	1.4 km	MPC · JPL
282081	2000 NG	—	July 1, 2000	Prescott	P. G. Comba	·	1.6 km	MPC · JPL
282082	2000 PE_{6}	—	August 5, 2000	Haleakala	NEAT	H	990 m	MPC · JPL
282083	2000 PX_{27}	—	August 9, 2000	Socorro	LINEAR	·	2.4 km	MPC · JPL
282084	2000 QN_{7}	—	August 25, 2000	Socorro	LINEAR	·	2.6 km	MPC · JPL
282085	2000 QD_{24}	—	August 25, 2000	Socorro	LINEAR	NYS	1.3 km	MPC · JPL
282086	2000 QS_{39}	—	August 24, 2000	Socorro	LINEAR	·	1.3 km	MPC · JPL
282087	2000 QW_{59}	—	August 26, 2000	Socorro	LINEAR	·	1.2 km	MPC · JPL
282088	2000 QU_{84}	—	August 25, 2000	Socorro	LINEAR	·	1.5 km	MPC · JPL
282089	2000 QK_{134}	—	August 26, 2000	Socorro	LINEAR	·	1.4 km	MPC · JPL
282090	2000 QE_{143}	—	August 31, 2000	Socorro	LINEAR	·	3.8 km	MPC · JPL
282091	2000 QL_{158}	—	August 31, 2000	Socorro	LINEAR	·	5.0 km	MPC · JPL
282092	2000 QM_{229}	—	August 31, 2000	Socorro	LINEAR	·	1.4 km	MPC · JPL
282093	2000 RR_{75}	—	September 3, 2000	Socorro	LINEAR	·	1.9 km	MPC · JPL
282094	2000 RN_{90}	—	September 3, 2000	Socorro	LINEAR	·	4.4 km	MPC · JPL
282095	2000 SP_{20}	—	September 23, 2000	Socorro	LINEAR	·	2.2 km	MPC · JPL
282096	2000 SG_{26}	—	September 23, 2000	Socorro	LINEAR	·	4.1 km	MPC · JPL
282097	2000 ST_{63}	—	September 24, 2000	Socorro	LINEAR	·	1.7 km	MPC · JPL
282098	2000 SN_{78}	—	September 24, 2000	Socorro	LINEAR	·	1.5 km	MPC · JPL
282099	2000 SH_{96}	—	September 23, 2000	Socorro	LINEAR	·	5.5 km	MPC · JPL
282100	2000 SP_{134}	—	September 23, 2000	Socorro	LINEAR	·	1.1 km	MPC · JPL

== 282101–282200 ==
back to top

Designation			Discovery			Properties		Ref
Permanent	Provisional	Named after	Date	Site	Discoverer(s)	Category	Diam.	Ref
282101	2000 SE_{225}	—	September 27, 2000	Socorro	LINEAR	MAS	1.0 km	MPC · JPL
282102	2000 SL_{286}	—	September 25, 2000	Socorro	LINEAR	·	1.9 km	MPC · JPL
282103	2000 TV_{17}	—	October 1, 2000	Socorro	LINEAR	·	1.5 km	MPC · JPL
282104	2000 TN_{60}	—	October 2, 2000	Anderson Mesa	LONEOS	PHO	1.7 km	MPC · JPL
282105	2000 UN_{95}	—	October 25, 2000	Socorro	LINEAR	·	1.9 km	MPC · JPL
282106	2000 UE_{97}	—	October 25, 2000	Socorro	LINEAR	·	2.0 km	MPC · JPL
282107	2000 VW_{6}	—	November 1, 2000	Socorro	LINEAR	fast	1.3 km	MPC · JPL
282108	2000 WH_{36}	—	November 20, 2000	Socorro	LINEAR	·	2.6 km	MPC · JPL
282109	2000 WL_{67}	—	November 27, 2000	Socorro	LINEAR	H	730 m	MPC · JPL
282110	2000 WJ_{79}	—	November 20, 2000	Socorro	LINEAR	·	1.8 km	MPC · JPL
282111	2000 WW_{123}	—	November 27, 2000	Kitt Peak	Spacewatch	·	1.8 km	MPC · JPL
282112	2000 WT_{160}	—	November 20, 2000	Anderson Mesa	LONEOS	·	1.9 km	MPC · JPL
282113	2000 WY_{174}	—	November 26, 2000	Socorro	LINEAR	·	2.4 km	MPC · JPL
282114	2000 WL_{177}	—	November 27, 2000	Socorro	LINEAR	·	2.3 km	MPC · JPL
282115	2000 YS_{97}	—	December 30, 2000	Socorro	LINEAR	(5)	2.1 km	MPC · JPL
282116	2001 AF_{8}	—	January 2, 2001	Socorro	LINEAR	EUN	1.9 km	MPC · JPL
282117	2001 AN_{10}	—	January 2, 2001	Socorro	LINEAR	·	1.0 km	MPC · JPL
282118	2001 AT_{37}	—	January 5, 2001	Socorro	LINEAR	·	4.4 km	MPC · JPL
282119	2001 BN_{57}	—	January 20, 2001	Haleakala	NEAT	·	2.1 km	MPC · JPL
282120	2001 CU_{41}	—	February 15, 2001	Ondřejov	P. Pravec, L. Kotková	·	5.0 km	MPC · JPL
282121	2001 DW_{6}	—	February 16, 2001	Črni Vrh	Matičič, S.	·	3.8 km	MPC · JPL
282122	2001 DD_{8}	—	February 16, 2001	Kitt Peak	Spacewatch	·	2.2 km	MPC · JPL
282123	2001 DU_{39}	—	February 19, 2001	Socorro	LINEAR	·	3.4 km	MPC · JPL
282124	2001 FV_{186}	—	March 18, 2001	Anderson Mesa	LONEOS	(18466)	3.1 km	MPC · JPL
282125	2001 HP_{6}	—	April 18, 2001	Kitt Peak	Spacewatch	·	710 m	MPC · JPL
282126	2001 MV_{1}	—	June 18, 2001	Anderson Mesa	LONEOS	·	1.5 km	MPC · JPL
282127	2001 MD_{18}	—	June 20, 2001	Haleakala	NEAT	PHO	1.5 km	MPC · JPL
282128	2001 NT_{12}	—	July 13, 2001	Haleakala	NEAT	·	940 m	MPC · JPL
282129	2001 NG_{17}	—	July 14, 2001	Palomar	NEAT	MAR	1.8 km	MPC · JPL
282130	2001 ON_{55}	—	July 22, 2001	Palomar	NEAT	H	820 m	MPC · JPL
282131	2001 OW_{87}	—	July 30, 2001	Palomar	NEAT	·	2.1 km	MPC · JPL
282132	2001 PM_{39}	—	August 11, 2001	Palomar	NEAT	·	1.2 km	MPC · JPL
282133	2001 QL_{48}	—	August 16, 2001	Socorro	LINEAR	·	2.1 km	MPC · JPL
282134	2001 QU_{114}	—	August 17, 2001	Socorro	LINEAR	·	930 m	MPC · JPL
282135	2001 QJ_{132}	—	August 20, 2001	Socorro	LINEAR	·	1.1 km	MPC · JPL
282136	2001 QX_{133}	—	August 21, 2001	Socorro	LINEAR	·	930 m	MPC · JPL
282137	2001 QE_{153}	—	August 26, 2001	Haleakala	NEAT	·	740 m	MPC · JPL
282138	2001 QN_{153}	—	August 25, 2001	Socorro	LINEAR	PHO	1.3 km	MPC · JPL
282139	2001 QL_{157}	—	August 23, 2001	Anderson Mesa	LONEOS	·	3.1 km	MPC · JPL
282140	2001 QK_{166}	—	August 24, 2001	Haleakala	NEAT	·	2.4 km	MPC · JPL
282141	2001 QQ_{170}	—	August 24, 2001	Socorro	LINEAR	·	630 m	MPC · JPL
282142	2001 QG_{268}	—	August 20, 2001	Socorro	LINEAR	·	3.9 km	MPC · JPL
282143	2001 QT_{327}	—	August 17, 2001	Palomar	NEAT	·	5.2 km	MPC · JPL
282144	2001 QH_{330}	—	August 25, 2001	Anderson Mesa	LONEOS	·	950 m	MPC · JPL
282145	2001 QJ_{333}	—	August 19, 2001	Socorro	LINEAR	·	4.0 km	MPC · JPL
282146	2001 RJ_{3}	—	September 8, 2001	Anderson Mesa	LONEOS	·	3.8 km	MPC · JPL
282147	2001 RV_{39}	—	September 10, 2001	Socorro	LINEAR	·	820 m	MPC · JPL
282148	2001 RC_{54}	—	September 12, 2001	Socorro	LINEAR	H	640 m	MPC · JPL
282149	2001 RN_{58}	—	September 12, 2001	Socorro	LINEAR	·	1.0 km	MPC · JPL
282150	2001 RE_{72}	—	September 10, 2001	Socorro	LINEAR	·	1.2 km	MPC · JPL
282151	2001 RF_{82}	—	September 11, 2001	Anderson Mesa	LONEOS	·	790 m	MPC · JPL
282152	2001 RF_{115}	—	September 12, 2001	Socorro	LINEAR	EOS	2.4 km	MPC · JPL
282153	2001 SF_{5}	—	September 16, 2001	Socorro	LINEAR	H	730 m	MPC · JPL
282154	2001 SU_{12}	—	September 16, 2001	Socorro	LINEAR	·	1.2 km	MPC · JPL
282155	2001 SL_{17}	—	September 16, 2001	Socorro	LINEAR	·	2.6 km	MPC · JPL
282156	2001 SS_{49}	—	September 16, 2001	Socorro	LINEAR	H	720 m	MPC · JPL
282157	2001 SS_{94}	—	September 20, 2001	Socorro	LINEAR	·	1.0 km	MPC · JPL
282158	2001 SY_{101}	—	September 20, 2001	Socorro	LINEAR	·	1.0 km	MPC · JPL
282159	2001 SV_{110}	—	September 20, 2001	Socorro	LINEAR	·	6.1 km	MPC · JPL
282160	2001 SG_{112}	—	September 19, 2001	Socorro	LINEAR	·	600 m	MPC · JPL
282161	2001 SO_{112}	—	September 20, 2001	Socorro	LINEAR	H	720 m	MPC · JPL
282162	2001 SC_{167}	—	September 19, 2001	Socorro	LINEAR	EOS	2.6 km	MPC · JPL
282163	2001 SK_{207}	—	September 19, 2001	Socorro	LINEAR	·	660 m	MPC · JPL
282164	2001 SA_{223}	—	September 19, 2001	Socorro	LINEAR	·	4.4 km	MPC · JPL
282165	2001 SF_{227}	—	September 19, 2001	Socorro	LINEAR	·	2.3 km	MPC · JPL
282166	2001 SU_{229}	—	September 19, 2001	Socorro	LINEAR	·	2.9 km	MPC · JPL
282167	2001 ST_{275}	—	September 21, 2001	Kitt Peak	Spacewatch	·	610 m	MPC · JPL
282168	2001 SJ_{280}	—	September 21, 2001	Anderson Mesa	LONEOS	·	3.9 km	MPC · JPL
282169	2001 SV_{317}	—	September 19, 2001	Socorro	LINEAR	·	2.4 km	MPC · JPL
282170	2001 SB_{323}	—	September 25, 2001	Socorro	LINEAR	·	780 m	MPC · JPL
282171	2001 ST_{345}	—	September 23, 2001	Haleakala	NEAT	·	940 m	MPC · JPL
282172	2001 SW_{353}	—	September 26, 2001	Socorro	LINEAR	·	5.2 km	MPC · JPL
282173	2001 SX_{353}	—	September 28, 2001	Socorro	LINEAR	·	7.7 km	MPC · JPL
282174	2001 TP_{7}	—	October 11, 2001	Desert Eagle	W. K. Y. Yeung	H	820 m	MPC · JPL
282175	2001 TC_{13}	—	October 13, 2001	Socorro	LINEAR	H	650 m	MPC · JPL
282176	2001 TR_{21}	—	October 11, 2001	Socorro	LINEAR	·	1.3 km	MPC · JPL
282177	2001 TZ_{23}	—	October 14, 2001	Socorro	LINEAR	·	1.2 km	MPC · JPL
282178	2001 TJ_{25}	—	October 14, 2001	Socorro	LINEAR	V	780 m	MPC · JPL
282179	2001 TK_{46}	—	October 15, 2001	Socorro	LINEAR	·	5.4 km	MPC · JPL
282180	2001 TX_{48}	—	October 15, 2001	Socorro	LINEAR	H	720 m	MPC · JPL
282181	2001 TN_{76}	—	October 13, 2001	Socorro	LINEAR	·	1.9 km	MPC · JPL
282182	2001 TZ_{86}	—	October 14, 2001	Socorro	LINEAR	·	3.9 km	MPC · JPL
282183	2001 TJ_{88}	—	October 14, 2001	Socorro	LINEAR	·	4.0 km	MPC · JPL
282184	2001 TV_{111}	—	October 14, 2001	Socorro	LINEAR	·	1.3 km	MPC · JPL
282185	2001 TL_{175}	—	October 14, 2001	Socorro	LINEAR	·	4.9 km	MPC · JPL
282186	2001 TG_{180}	—	October 14, 2001	Socorro	LINEAR	·	4.3 km	MPC · JPL
282187	2001 TZ_{180}	—	October 14, 2001	Socorro	LINEAR	·	990 m	MPC · JPL
282188	2001 TS_{181}	—	October 14, 2001	Socorro	LINEAR	·	860 m	MPC · JPL
282189	2001 TE_{188}	—	October 14, 2001	Socorro	LINEAR	·	2.8 km	MPC · JPL
282190	2001 TG_{198}	—	October 11, 2001	Eskridge	Farpoint	NYS	730 m	MPC · JPL
282191	2001 TU_{213}	—	October 13, 2001	Palomar	NEAT	ADE	2.1 km	MPC · JPL
282192	2001 TB_{229}	—	October 15, 2001	Socorro	LINEAR	L5	12 km	MPC · JPL
282193	2001 TR_{239}	—	October 15, 2001	Palomar	NEAT	·	1.5 km	MPC · JPL
282194	2001 TR_{243}	—	October 14, 2001	Apache Point	SDSS	VER	3.4 km	MPC · JPL
282195	2001 UD_{7}	—	October 22, 2001	Socorro	LINEAR	·	900 m	MPC · JPL
282196	2001 UV_{29}	—	October 16, 2001	Socorro	LINEAR	·	1.7 km	MPC · JPL
282197	2001 UE_{51}	—	October 17, 2001	Socorro	LINEAR	·	1.1 km	MPC · JPL
282198	2001 UM_{166}	—	October 23, 2001	Kitt Peak	Spacewatch	L5	13 km	MPC · JPL
282199	2001 UA_{184}	—	October 16, 2001	Socorro	LINEAR	H	730 m	MPC · JPL
282200	2001 UX_{188}	—	October 17, 2001	Palomar	NEAT	·	3.6 km	MPC · JPL

== 282201–282300 ==
back to top

Designation			Discovery			Properties		Ref
Permanent	Provisional	Named after	Date	Site	Discoverer(s)	Category	Diam.	Ref
282201	2001 UE_{218}	—	October 25, 2001	Kitt Peak	Spacewatch	·	4.3 km	MPC · JPL
282202	2001 VX_{20}	—	November 9, 2001	Socorro	LINEAR	·	1.7 km	MPC · JPL
282203	2001 VG_{51}	—	November 10, 2001	Socorro	LINEAR	LIX	5.4 km	MPC · JPL
282204	2001 VC_{53}	—	November 10, 2001	Socorro	LINEAR	·	3.9 km	MPC · JPL
282205	2001 VG_{54}	—	November 10, 2001	Socorro	LINEAR	EOS	3.3 km	MPC · JPL
282206	2001 VN_{61}	—	November 10, 2001	Socorro	LINEAR	·	1.0 km	MPC · JPL
282207	2001 VS_{76}	—	November 12, 2001	Socorro	LINEAR	H	690 m	MPC · JPL
282208	2001 VY_{95}	—	November 15, 2001	Socorro	LINEAR	·	6.0 km	MPC · JPL
282209	2001 VJ_{109}	—	November 12, 2001	Socorro	LINEAR	·	2.9 km	MPC · JPL
282210	2001 WS_{17}	—	November 17, 2001	Socorro	LINEAR	NEM	2.8 km	MPC · JPL
282211	2001 WX_{59}	—	November 19, 2001	Socorro	LINEAR	·	1.9 km	MPC · JPL
282212	2001 XG_{26}	—	December 10, 2001	Socorro	LINEAR	·	2.1 km	MPC · JPL
282213	2001 XT_{73}	—	December 11, 2001	Socorro	LINEAR	·	4.8 km	MPC · JPL
282214	2001 XG_{78}	—	December 11, 2001	Socorro	LINEAR	·	1.7 km	MPC · JPL
282215	2001 XY_{78}	—	December 11, 2001	Socorro	LINEAR	·	4.8 km	MPC · JPL
282216	2001 XU_{103}	—	December 14, 2001	Socorro	LINEAR	H	780 m	MPC · JPL
282217	2001 XE_{112}	—	December 11, 2001	Socorro	LINEAR	V	950 m	MPC · JPL
282218	2001 XS_{126}	—	December 14, 2001	Socorro	LINEAR	·	2.9 km	MPC · JPL
282219	2001 XN_{130}	—	December 14, 2001	Socorro	LINEAR	MAS	840 m	MPC · JPL
282220	2001 XT_{218}	—	December 15, 2001	Socorro	LINEAR	·	1.0 km	MPC · JPL
282221	2001 XE_{262}	—	December 12, 2001	Palomar	NEAT	·	890 m	MPC · JPL
282222	2001 YO_{1}	—	December 18, 2001	Socorro	LINEAR	H	760 m	MPC · JPL
282223	2001 YK_{78}	—	December 18, 2001	Socorro	LINEAR	(2076)	1.2 km	MPC · JPL
282224	2001 YK_{155}	—	December 20, 2001	Palomar	NEAT	·	4.3 km	MPC · JPL
282225	2001 YB_{162}	—	December 19, 2001	Cima Ekar	ADAS	·	2.1 km	MPC · JPL
282226	2002 AU_{17}	—	January 9, 2002	Socorro	LINEAR	·	1.2 km	MPC · JPL
282227	2002 AS_{20}	—	January 6, 2002	Haleakala	NEAT	H	850 m	MPC · JPL
282228	2002 AG_{22}	—	January 9, 2002	Socorro	LINEAR	·	2.0 km	MPC · JPL
282229	2002 AZ_{65}	—	January 12, 2002	Socorro	LINEAR	·	1.2 km	MPC · JPL
282230	2002 AM_{143}	—	January 13, 2002	Socorro	LINEAR	·	1.4 km	MPC · JPL
282231	2002 BS_{24}	—	January 23, 2002	Socorro	LINEAR	·	3.5 km	MPC · JPL
282232	2002 CC_{34}	—	February 6, 2002	Socorro	LINEAR	·	2.3 km	MPC · JPL
282233	2002 CA_{129}	—	February 7, 2002	Socorro	LINEAR	·	2.6 km	MPC · JPL
282234	2002 CY_{188}	—	February 10, 2002	Socorro	LINEAR	·	1.6 km	MPC · JPL
282235	2002 CF_{210}	—	February 10, 2002	Socorro	LINEAR	·	1.7 km	MPC · JPL
282236	2002 CJ_{223}	—	February 11, 2002	Socorro	LINEAR	·	1.9 km	MPC · JPL
282237	2002 CR_{279}	—	February 7, 2002	Kitt Peak	Spacewatch	·	1.6 km	MPC · JPL
282238	2002 CN_{281}	—	February 8, 2002	Kitt Peak	Spacewatch	·	5.1 km	MPC · JPL
282239	2002 CP_{304}	—	February 15, 2002	Socorro	LINEAR	·	3.0 km	MPC · JPL
282240	2002 CW_{309}	—	February 6, 2002	Palomar	NEAT	·	1.5 km	MPC · JPL
282241	2002 CE_{314}	—	February 6, 2002	Palomar	NEAT	·	1.3 km	MPC · JPL
282242	2002 DM_{8}	—	February 19, 2002	Socorro	LINEAR	·	1.6 km	MPC · JPL
282243	2002 ES_{79}	—	March 11, 2002	Haleakala	NEAT	·	1.4 km	MPC · JPL
282244	2002 EZ_{160}	—	March 12, 2002	Apache Point	SDSS	·	2.1 km	MPC · JPL
282245	2002 GJ_{6}	—	April 13, 2002	Palomar	NEAT	·	2.6 km	MPC · JPL
282246	2002 GE_{11}	—	April 12, 2002	Desert Eagle	W. K. Y. Yeung	·	3.7 km	MPC · JPL
282247	2002 GO_{49}	—	April 5, 2002	Palomar	NEAT	·	2.1 km	MPC · JPL
282248	2002 GD_{61}	—	April 8, 2002	Palomar	NEAT	·	2.3 km	MPC · JPL
282249	2002 GA_{69}	—	April 8, 2002	Palomar	NEAT	·	4.8 km	MPC · JPL
282250	2002 GW_{115}	—	April 11, 2002	Socorro	LINEAR	·	1.7 km	MPC · JPL
282251	2002 GH_{160}	—	April 15, 2002	Palomar	NEAT	(5)	2.0 km	MPC · JPL
282252	2002 GJ_{183}	—	April 2, 2002	Kitt Peak	Spacewatch	·	4.2 km	MPC · JPL
282253	2002 GM_{183}	—	April 8, 2002	Palomar	NEAT	·	2.3 km	MPC · JPL
282254	2002 HP_{12}	—	April 21, 2002	Palomar	NEAT	·	2.4 km	MPC · JPL
282255	2002 JX_{49}	—	May 9, 2002	Socorro	LINEAR	EUN	1.4 km	MPC · JPL
282256	2002 JH_{67}	—	May 10, 2002	Socorro	LINEAR	·	2.8 km	MPC · JPL
282257	2002 JA_{75}	—	May 9, 2002	Socorro	LINEAR	·	2.3 km	MPC · JPL
282258	2002 JQ_{90}	—	May 11, 2002	Socorro	LINEAR	NYS	1.1 km	MPC · JPL
282259	2002 JZ_{98}	—	May 13, 2002	Palomar	NEAT	·	2.1 km	MPC · JPL
282260	2002 JT_{116}	—	May 4, 2002	Palomar	NEAT	·	2.2 km	MPC · JPL
282261	2002 JV_{116}	—	May 4, 2002	Palomar	NEAT	·	2.3 km	MPC · JPL
282262	2002 JK_{131}	—	April 9, 2002	Socorro	LINEAR	·	2.2 km	MPC · JPL
282263	2002 JJ_{145}	—	May 14, 2002	Socorro	LINEAR	ADE	3.8 km	MPC · JPL
282264	2002 JT_{149}	—	May 10, 2002	Palomar	NEAT	·	2.1 km	MPC · JPL
282265	2002 KP_{14}	—	May 30, 2002	Palomar	NEAT	MAR	1.6 km	MPC · JPL
282266	2002 LS_{18}	—	June 6, 2002	Socorro	LINEAR	·	1.9 km	MPC · JPL
282267	2002 LY_{61}	—	June 12, 2002	Palomar	NEAT	·	2.8 km	MPC · JPL
282268	2002 NB_{4}	—	July 1, 2002	Palomar	NEAT	·	2.1 km	MPC · JPL
282269	2002 NQ_{17}	—	July 13, 2002	Haleakala	NEAT	·	2.5 km	MPC · JPL
282270	2002 NP_{25}	—	July 9, 2002	Socorro	LINEAR	·	3.8 km	MPC · JPL
282271	2002 NL_{66}	—	July 9, 2002	Palomar	NEAT	·	2.6 km	MPC · JPL
282272	2002 NT_{75}	—	October 21, 2003	Kitt Peak	Spacewatch	·	3.5 km	MPC · JPL
282273	2002 NU_{76}	—	October 9, 2007	Kitt Peak	Spacewatch	·	2.1 km	MPC · JPL
282274	2002 OB_{6}	—	July 20, 2002	Palomar	NEAT	GEF	1.5 km	MPC · JPL
282275	2002 OM_{12}	—	July 25, 2002	Palomar	NEAT	·	2.9 km	MPC · JPL
282276	2002 OQ_{14}	—	July 18, 2002	Socorro	LINEAR	(18466)	3.0 km	MPC · JPL
282277	2002 OR_{15}	—	July 18, 2002	Socorro	LINEAR	GEF	1.7 km	MPC · JPL
282278	2002 OB_{16}	—	July 18, 2002	Socorro	LINEAR	·	3.3 km	MPC · JPL
282279	2002 OH_{18}	—	July 18, 2002	Socorro	LINEAR	·	3.3 km	MPC · JPL
282280	2002 OQ_{21}	—	July 18, 2002	Palomar	NEAT	·	2.3 km	MPC · JPL
282281	2002 PF_{16}	—	August 6, 2002	Palomar	NEAT	·	2.7 km	MPC · JPL
282282	2002 PK_{38}	—	August 6, 2002	Palomar	NEAT	·	2.5 km	MPC · JPL
282283	2002 PJ_{41}	—	August 4, 2002	Socorro	LINEAR	·	2.4 km	MPC · JPL
282284	2002 PW_{63}	—	August 4, 2002	Palomar	NEAT	·	2.4 km	MPC · JPL
282285	2002 PS_{69}	—	August 11, 2002	Socorro	LINEAR	·	3.3 km	MPC · JPL
282286	2002 PM_{83}	—	August 10, 2002	Socorro	LINEAR	·	2.8 km	MPC · JPL
282287	2002 PX_{89}	—	August 11, 2002	Socorro	LINEAR	·	4.0 km	MPC · JPL
282288	2002 PS_{109}	—	August 13, 2002	Socorro	LINEAR	WAT	2.1 km	MPC · JPL
282289	2002 PV_{123}	—	August 13, 2002	Anderson Mesa	LONEOS	·	2.5 km	MPC · JPL
282290	2002 PU_{128}	—	August 14, 2002	Socorro	LINEAR	GEF	1.9 km	MPC · JPL
282291	2002 PF_{131}	—	August 7, 2002	Palomar	NEAT	·	2.3 km	MPC · JPL
282292	2002 PK_{170}	—	August 15, 2002	Palomar	NEAT	·	2.6 km	MPC · JPL
282293	2002 QP	—	August 16, 2002	Socorro	LINEAR	GEF	2.1 km	MPC · JPL
282294	2002 QN_{5}	—	August 16, 2002	Palomar	NEAT	·	3.0 km	MPC · JPL
282295	2002 QB_{14}	—	August 26, 2002	Palomar	NEAT	GEF	2.0 km	MPC · JPL
282296	2002 QF_{38}	—	August 30, 2002	Kitt Peak	Spacewatch	TRE	2.6 km	MPC · JPL
282297	2002 QW_{79}	—	August 28, 2002	Palomar	NEAT	·	2.7 km	MPC · JPL
282298	2002 QR_{82}	—	August 16, 2002	Palomar	NEAT	DOR	2.7 km	MPC · JPL
282299	2002 QA_{119}	—	August 18, 2002	Palomar	NEAT	·	2.0 km	MPC · JPL
282300	2002 QT_{127}	—	August 29, 2002	Palomar	NEAT	·	2.7 km	MPC · JPL

== 282301–282400 ==
back to top

Designation			Discovery			Properties		Ref
Permanent	Provisional	Named after	Date	Site	Discoverer(s)	Category	Diam.	Ref
282301	2002 RT_{4}	—	September 3, 2002	Palomar	NEAT	·	1.7 km	MPC · JPL
282302	2002 RA_{118}	—	September 3, 2002	Palomar	NEAT	·	3.6 km	MPC · JPL
282303	2002 RN_{255}	—	September 3, 2002	Palomar	NEAT	(18466)	3.4 km	MPC · JPL
282304	2002 SL_{46}	—	September 29, 2002	Haleakala	NEAT	·	2.1 km	MPC · JPL
282305	2002 SQ_{51}	—	September 17, 2002	Palomar	NEAT	·	2.3 km	MPC · JPL
282306	2002 TC_{6}	—	October 1, 2002	Socorro	LINEAR	·	3.2 km	MPC · JPL
282307	2002 TX_{12}	—	October 1, 2002	Anderson Mesa	LONEOS	·	2.4 km	MPC · JPL
282308	2002 TH_{26}	—	October 2, 2002	Socorro	LINEAR	·	750 m	MPC · JPL
282309	2002 TY_{71}	—	October 3, 2002	Palomar	NEAT	·	3.5 km	MPC · JPL
282310	2002 TA_{82}	—	October 1, 2002	Haleakala	NEAT	·	1.9 km	MPC · JPL
282311	2002 TW_{90}	—	October 3, 2002	Palomar	NEAT	·	2.9 km	MPC · JPL
282312	2002 TP_{95}	—	October 3, 2002	Palomar	NEAT	·	3.1 km	MPC · JPL
282313	2002 TO_{112}	—	October 3, 2002	Palomar	NEAT	·	3.4 km	MPC · JPL
282314	2002 TQ_{116}	—	October 3, 2002	Palomar	NEAT	·	4.2 km	MPC · JPL
282315	2002 TD_{132}	—	October 4, 2002	Socorro	LINEAR	·	3.4 km	MPC · JPL
282316	2002 TG_{136}	—	October 4, 2002	Anderson Mesa	LONEOS	·	2.6 km	MPC · JPL
282317	2002 TT_{138}	—	October 4, 2002	Anderson Mesa	LONEOS	·	4.3 km	MPC · JPL
282318	2002 TS_{146}	—	October 4, 2002	Socorro	LINEAR	·	2.6 km	MPC · JPL
282319	2002 TS_{159}	—	October 5, 2002	Palomar	NEAT	EOS	2.5 km	MPC · JPL
282320	2002 TW_{171}	—	October 4, 2002	Palomar	NEAT	BRA	2.2 km	MPC · JPL
282321	2002 TB_{192}	—	October 5, 2002	Anderson Mesa	LONEOS	·	2.9 km	MPC · JPL
282322	2002 TG_{193}	—	October 3, 2002	Socorro	LINEAR	·	1.4 km	MPC · JPL
282323	2002 TN_{218}	—	October 5, 2002	Socorro	LINEAR	·	2.5 km	MPC · JPL
282324	2002 TB_{231}	—	October 8, 2002	Palomar	NEAT	·	3.0 km	MPC · JPL
282325	2002 TM_{232}	—	October 6, 2002	Socorro	LINEAR	(18466)	3.7 km	MPC · JPL
282326	2002 TW_{313}	—	October 4, 2002	Apache Point	SDSS	·	2.9 km	MPC · JPL
282327	2002 TB_{314}	—	October 4, 2002	Apache Point	SDSS	·	4.0 km	MPC · JPL
282328	2002 TD_{315}	—	October 4, 2002	Apache Point	SDSS	EOS	5.1 km	MPC · JPL
282329	2002 TP_{315}	—	October 4, 2002	Apache Point	SDSS	EOS	4.5 km	MPC · JPL
282330	2002 TG_{384}	—	October 15, 2002	Palomar	NEAT	EOS	2.6 km	MPC · JPL
282331	2002 UK_{35}	—	October 31, 2002	Palomar	NEAT	EOS	2.8 km	MPC · JPL
282332	2002 UO_{42}	—	October 30, 2002	Kitt Peak	Spacewatch	·	2.5 km	MPC · JPL
282333	2002 UX_{51}	—	October 29, 2002	Apache Point	SDSS	·	1.7 km	MPC · JPL
282334	2002 UN_{59}	—	October 29, 2002	Apache Point	SDSS	EOS	2.5 km	MPC · JPL
282335	2002 UV_{70}	—	October 30, 2002	Haleakala	NEAT	EOS	2.7 km	MPC · JPL
282336	2002 VT	—	November 1, 2002	Palomar	NEAT	L5	10 km	MPC · JPL
282337	2002 VC_{3}	—	November 1, 2002	Palomar	NEAT	EOS	2.3 km	MPC · JPL
282338	2002 VQ_{11}	—	November 1, 2002	Palomar	NEAT	·	1.2 km	MPC · JPL
282339	2002 VW_{93}	—	November 12, 2002	Socorro	LINEAR	·	2.9 km	MPC · JPL
282340	2002 XM_{21}	—	December 2, 2002	Socorro	LINEAR	EOS	2.8 km	MPC · JPL
282341	2002 XZ_{30}	—	December 6, 2002	Socorro	LINEAR	·	2.9 km	MPC · JPL
282342	2002 XA_{33}	—	December 6, 2002	Socorro	LINEAR	NYS	910 m	MPC · JPL
282343	2002 XB_{47}	—	December 8, 2002	Haleakala	NEAT	·	1.3 km	MPC · JPL
282344	2002 XN_{117}	—	December 7, 2002	Palomar	NEAT	·	2.9 km	MPC · JPL
282345	2002 YE_{5}	—	December 28, 2002	Socorro	LINEAR	BAR	2.0 km	MPC · JPL
282346	2002 YY_{32}	—	December 28, 2002	Kitt Peak	Spacewatch	EOS	2.8 km	MPC · JPL
282347	2003 AZ_{22}	—	January 7, 2003	Socorro	LINEAR	·	3.1 km	MPC · JPL
282348	2003 AF_{41}	—	January 7, 2003	Socorro	LINEAR	H	590 m	MPC · JPL
282349	2003 BA_{56}	—	January 28, 2003	Kitt Peak	Spacewatch	·	3.1 km	MPC · JPL
282350	2003 BW_{72}	—	January 28, 2003	Haleakala	NEAT	·	8.3 km	MPC · JPL
282351	2003 DQ_{2}	—	February 22, 2003	Palomar	NEAT	·	1.5 km	MPC · JPL
282352	2003 FN_{75}	—	March 27, 2003	Palomar	NEAT	JUN	1.4 km	MPC · JPL
282353	2003 FS_{91}	—	March 29, 2003	Anderson Mesa	LONEOS	(5)	1.9 km	MPC · JPL
282354	2003 FZ_{107}	—	March 31, 2003	Anderson Mesa	LONEOS	·	1.6 km	MPC · JPL
282355	2003 FC_{124}	—	March 30, 2003	Kitt Peak	M. W. Buie	·	1.8 km	MPC · JPL
282356	2003 GE_{1}	—	April 1, 2003	Socorro	LINEAR	·	2.8 km	MPC · JPL
282357	2003 HL_{1}	—	April 22, 2003	Siding Spring	R. H. McNaught	·	1.3 km	MPC · JPL
282358	2003 HK_{5}	—	April 24, 2003	Kitt Peak	Spacewatch	·	1.5 km	MPC · JPL
282359	2003 HG_{16}	—	April 25, 2003	Campo Imperatore	CINEOS	·	1.8 km	MPC · JPL
282360	2003 HR_{22}	—	April 25, 2003	Socorro	LINEAR	H	730 m	MPC · JPL
282361	2003 KD_{19}	—	May 29, 2003	Kitt Peak	Spacewatch	·	1.8 km	MPC · JPL
282362	2003 LS_{2}	—	June 3, 2003	Anderson Mesa	LONEOS	·	2.4 km	MPC · JPL
282363	2003 MD_{2}	—	June 22, 2003	Anderson Mesa	LONEOS	·	2.0 km	MPC · JPL
282364	2003 NR_{2}	—	July 2, 2003	Socorro	LINEAR	H	760 m	MPC · JPL
282365	2003 NU_{11}	—	July 3, 2003	Kitt Peak	Spacewatch	·	2.0 km	MPC · JPL
282366	2003 OO_{10}	—	July 27, 2003	Reedy Creek	J. Broughton	slow	2.2 km	MPC · JPL
282367	2003 OD_{11}	—	July 21, 2003	Palomar	NEAT	BAR	1.5 km	MPC · JPL
282368	2003 OA_{13}	—	July 25, 2003	Socorro	LINEAR	·	2.2 km	MPC · JPL
282369	2003 OB_{19}	—	July 30, 2003	Palomar	NEAT	·	2.9 km	MPC · JPL
282370	2003 PR_{9}	—	August 1, 2003	Socorro	LINEAR	·	5.5 km	MPC · JPL
282371	2003 PB_{13}	—	August 4, 2003	Haleakala	NEAT	·	1.8 km	MPC · JPL
282372	2003 QN_{15}	—	August 20, 2003	Palomar	NEAT	·	1.6 km	MPC · JPL
282373	2003 QK_{16}	—	August 20, 2003	Campo Imperatore	CINEOS	·	1.2 km	MPC · JPL
282374	2003 QW_{21}	—	August 20, 2003	Palomar	NEAT	·	2.1 km	MPC · JPL
282375	2003 QT_{33}	—	August 22, 2003	Palomar	NEAT	(5)	1.7 km	MPC · JPL
282376	2003 QH_{40}	—	August 22, 2003	Socorro	LINEAR	·	1.1 km	MPC · JPL
282377	2003 QN_{60}	—	August 23, 2003	Socorro	LINEAR	·	2.7 km	MPC · JPL
282378	2003 QQ_{63}	—	August 23, 2003	Socorro	LINEAR	·	5.6 km	MPC · JPL
282379	2003 QU_{71}	—	August 25, 2003	Palomar	NEAT	·	4.3 km	MPC · JPL
282380	2003 QL_{86}	—	August 25, 2003	Palomar	NEAT	·	3.6 km	MPC · JPL
282381	2003 QS_{109}	—	August 26, 2003	Haleakala	NEAT	EUN	1.6 km	MPC · JPL
282382	2003 RU_{22}	—	September 1, 2003	Socorro	LINEAR	EUN	1.5 km	MPC · JPL
282383	2003 RU_{25}	—	September 15, 2003	Palomar	NEAT	EUN	1.9 km	MPC · JPL
282384	2003 SB_{11}	—	September 17, 2003	Kitt Peak	Spacewatch	VER	5.8 km	MPC · JPL
282385	2003 SU_{26}	—	September 18, 2003	Palomar	NEAT	·	1.2 km	MPC · JPL
282386	2003 SN_{35}	—	September 18, 2003	Palomar	NEAT	·	4.9 km	MPC · JPL
282387	2003 SC_{38}	—	September 16, 2003	Palomar	NEAT	·	2.9 km	MPC · JPL
282388	2003 SM_{81}	—	September 19, 2003	Haleakala	NEAT	·	1.7 km	MPC · JPL
282389	2003 SA_{98}	—	September 19, 2003	Palomar	NEAT	·	1.4 km	MPC · JPL
282390	2003 SQ_{118}	—	September 16, 2003	Kitt Peak	Spacewatch	AST	1.7 km	MPC · JPL
282391	2003 SK_{131}	—	September 19, 2003	Kitt Peak	Spacewatch	·	1.3 km	MPC · JPL
282392	2003 SX_{145}	—	September 20, 2003	Palomar	NEAT	·	2.6 km	MPC · JPL
282393	2003 SR_{194}	—	September 20, 2003	Palomar	NEAT	·	2.7 km	MPC · JPL
282394	2003 ST_{196}	—	September 20, 2003	Palomar	NEAT	·	2.5 km	MPC · JPL
282395	2003 SY_{214}	—	September 27, 2003	Socorro	LINEAR	·	6.5 km	MPC · JPL
282396	2003 SA_{222}	—	September 27, 2003	Socorro	LINEAR	·	1.8 km	MPC · JPL
282397	2003 SU_{257}	—	September 28, 2003	Socorro	LINEAR	·	1.6 km	MPC · JPL
282398	2003 SM_{273}	—	September 27, 2003	Socorro	LINEAR	·	1.5 km	MPC · JPL
282399	2003 SV_{294}	—	September 28, 2003	Socorro	LINEAR	·	3.5 km	MPC · JPL
282400	2003 SQ_{303}	—	September 17, 2003	Palomar	NEAT	·	3.0 km	MPC · JPL

== 282401–282500 ==
back to top

Designation			Discovery			Properties		Ref
Permanent	Provisional	Named after	Date	Site	Discoverer(s)	Category	Diam.	Ref
282401	2003 SF_{305}	—	September 17, 2003	Palomar	NEAT	·	3.0 km	MPC · JPL
282402	2003 SA_{313}	—	September 17, 2003	Palomar	NEAT	·	2.5 km	MPC · JPL
282403	2003 SV_{320}	—	September 18, 2003	Kitt Peak	Spacewatch	·	2.2 km	MPC · JPL
282404	2003 SH_{336}	—	September 26, 2003	Apache Point	SDSS	·	2.8 km	MPC · JPL
282405	2003 TW_{13}	—	October 5, 2003	Socorro	LINEAR	H	810 m	MPC · JPL
282406	2003 TR_{21}	—	October 1, 2003	Anderson Mesa	LONEOS	·	3.0 km	MPC · JPL
282407	2003 TC_{56}	—	October 5, 2003	Kitt Peak	Spacewatch	·	1.3 km	MPC · JPL
282408	2003 UW_{8}	—	October 18, 2003	Kvistaberg	Uppsala-DLR Asteroid Survey	ADE	2.8 km	MPC · JPL
282409	2003 UL_{11}	—	October 20, 2003	Socorro	LINEAR	H	840 m	MPC · JPL
282410	2003 UX_{14}	—	October 16, 2003	Kitt Peak	Spacewatch	·	1.8 km	MPC · JPL
282411	2003 UJ_{17}	—	October 17, 2003	Kitt Peak	Spacewatch	·	2.2 km	MPC · JPL
282412	2003 UF_{62}	—	October 16, 2003	Anderson Mesa	LONEOS	·	2.0 km	MPC · JPL
282413	2003 UQ_{144}	—	October 18, 2003	Anderson Mesa	LONEOS	·	2.6 km	MPC · JPL
282414	2003 UQ_{179}	—	October 21, 2003	Socorro	LINEAR	·	2.6 km	MPC · JPL
282415	2003 UK_{200}	—	October 21, 2003	Socorro	LINEAR	·	2.9 km	MPC · JPL
282416	2003 UX_{202}	—	October 21, 2003	Palomar	NEAT	·	2.4 km	MPC · JPL
282417	2003 UA_{205}	—	October 22, 2003	Socorro	LINEAR	HNS	1.9 km	MPC · JPL
282418	2003 UF_{213}	—	October 23, 2003	Haleakala	NEAT	·	1.5 km	MPC · JPL
282419	2003 UX_{223}	—	October 22, 2003	Socorro	LINEAR	·	1.4 km	MPC · JPL
282420	2003 UB_{251}	—	October 25, 2003	Socorro	LINEAR	·	2.9 km	MPC · JPL
282421	2003 UQ_{274}	—	October 30, 2003	Socorro	LINEAR	·	2.6 km	MPC · JPL
282422	2003 UF_{322}	—	October 16, 2003	Kitt Peak	Spacewatch	·	2.3 km	MPC · JPL
282423	2003 UZ_{323}	—	October 17, 2003	Apache Point	SDSS	·	4.6 km	MPC · JPL
282424	2003 UM_{362}	—	October 20, 2003	Kitt Peak	Spacewatch	·	2.6 km	MPC · JPL
282425	2003 UQ_{374}	—	October 22, 2003	Apache Point	SDSS	·	1.4 km	MPC · JPL
282426	2003 UO_{381}	—	October 22, 2003	Apache Point	SDSS	·	3.3 km	MPC · JPL
282427	2003 WG_{54}	—	November 20, 2003	Socorro	LINEAR	·	4.4 km	MPC · JPL
282428	2003 WU_{66}	—	November 19, 2003	Kitt Peak	Spacewatch	MAS	840 m	MPC · JPL
282429	2003 WW_{78}	—	November 20, 2003	Socorro	LINEAR	·	2.8 km	MPC · JPL
282430	2003 WS_{86}	—	November 21, 2003	Socorro	LINEAR	(2076)	1.1 km	MPC · JPL
282431	2003 WU_{86}	—	November 21, 2003	Socorro	LINEAR	·	2.4 km	MPC · JPL
282432	2003 WK_{89}	—	November 16, 2003	Catalina	CSS	·	2.9 km	MPC · JPL
282433	2003 WO_{137}	—	November 21, 2003	Socorro	LINEAR	·	2.9 km	MPC · JPL
282434	2003 WX_{139}	—	November 21, 2003	Socorro	LINEAR	·	5.7 km	MPC · JPL
282435	2003 WY_{161}	—	November 30, 2003	Socorro	LINEAR	·	3.1 km	MPC · JPL
282436	2003 WR_{189}	—	November 21, 2003	Catalina	CSS	·	4.2 km	MPC · JPL
282437	2003 XE_{6}	—	December 3, 2003	Socorro	LINEAR	EUN	2.2 km	MPC · JPL
282438	2003 XV_{21}	—	December 15, 2003	Palomar	NEAT	·	3.0 km	MPC · JPL
282439	2003 XE_{22}	—	December 14, 2003	Socorro	LINEAR	·	3.4 km	MPC · JPL
282440	2003 YL_{35}	—	December 19, 2003	Socorro	LINEAR	(1547)	2.3 km	MPC · JPL
282441	2003 YY_{42}	—	December 19, 2003	Kitt Peak	Spacewatch	MAS	820 m	MPC · JPL
282442	2003 YX_{55}	—	December 19, 2003	Socorro	LINEAR	·	2.1 km	MPC · JPL
282443	2003 YT_{90}	—	December 20, 2003	Socorro	LINEAR	·	1.7 km	MPC · JPL
282444	2003 YJ_{102}	—	December 19, 2003	Socorro	LINEAR	EUP	5.5 km	MPC · JPL
282445	2003 YP_{102}	—	December 19, 2003	Socorro	LINEAR	·	1.2 km	MPC · JPL
282446	2003 YK_{152}	—	December 29, 2003	Socorro	LINEAR	EOS	2.7 km	MPC · JPL
282447	2004 BC_{35}	—	January 19, 2004	Kitt Peak	Spacewatch	TEL	1.6 km	MPC · JPL
282448	2004 BL_{81}	—	January 26, 2004	Anderson Mesa	LONEOS	·	4.3 km	MPC · JPL
282449	2004 BS_{100}	—	January 28, 2004	Kitt Peak	Spacewatch	·	3.9 km	MPC · JPL
282450	2004 BE_{109}	—	January 28, 2004	Kitt Peak	Spacewatch	·	3.1 km	MPC · JPL
282451	2004 BH_{151}	—	January 18, 2004	Palomar	NEAT	·	2.9 km	MPC · JPL
282452	2004 CT_{18}	—	February 10, 2004	Palomar	NEAT	·	4.3 km	MPC · JPL
282453	2004 CH_{32}	—	February 12, 2004	Kitt Peak	Spacewatch	·	2.1 km	MPC · JPL
282454	2004 CP_{47}	—	February 14, 2004	Kitt Peak	Spacewatch	·	950 m	MPC · JPL
282455	2004 CY_{48}	—	February 15, 2004	Haleakala	NEAT	V	1.0 km	MPC · JPL
282456	2004 CB_{68}	—	February 10, 2004	Palomar	NEAT	·	4.6 km	MPC · JPL
282457	2004 CY_{88}	—	February 11, 2004	Kitt Peak	Spacewatch	·	3.1 km	MPC · JPL
282458	2004 CC_{99}	—	February 15, 2004	Socorro	LINEAR	·	3.4 km	MPC · JPL
282459	2004 CF_{113}	—	February 13, 2004	Anderson Mesa	LONEOS	·	4.3 km	MPC · JPL
282460	2004 DN_{11}	—	February 16, 2004	Kitt Peak	Spacewatch	EOS	2.2 km	MPC · JPL
282461	2004 DO_{33}	—	February 18, 2004	Socorro	LINEAR	·	1.3 km	MPC · JPL
282462	2004 DO_{35}	—	February 19, 2004	Socorro	LINEAR	·	4.8 km	MPC · JPL
282463	2004 EJ_{59}	—	March 15, 2004	Palomar	NEAT	·	960 m	MPC · JPL
282464	2004 FY	—	March 16, 2004	Goodricke-Pigott	Goodricke-Pigott	·	1.1 km	MPC · JPL
282465	2004 FF_{13}	—	March 16, 2004	Catalina	CSS	·	1.7 km	MPC · JPL
282466	2004 FK_{30}	—	March 20, 2004	Siding Spring	SSS	·	4.1 km	MPC · JPL
282467	2004 FS_{56}	—	March 16, 2004	Kitt Peak	Spacewatch	·	1.1 km	MPC · JPL
282468	2004 FF_{61}	—	March 19, 2004	Socorro	LINEAR	·	770 m	MPC · JPL
282469	2004 FE_{141}	—	March 27, 2004	Socorro	LINEAR	ERI	1.7 km	MPC · JPL
282470	2004 FY_{143}	—	March 28, 2004	Socorro	LINEAR	·	710 m	MPC · JPL
282471	2004 GZ_{4}	—	April 11, 2004	Palomar	NEAT	·	1.1 km	MPC · JPL
282472	2004 GF_{21}	—	April 11, 2004	Palomar	NEAT	·	860 m	MPC · JPL
282473	2004 GZ_{23}	—	April 13, 2004	Catalina	CSS	·	1.0 km	MPC · JPL
282474	2004 GZ_{28}	—	April 9, 2004	Siding Spring	SSS	·	880 m	MPC · JPL
282475	2004 GE_{38}	—	April 14, 2004	Haleakala	NEAT	PHO	1.4 km	MPC · JPL
282476	2004 GN_{50}	—	April 12, 2004	Kitt Peak	Spacewatch	·	900 m	MPC · JPL
282477	2004 HU_{56}	—	April 27, 2004	Socorro	LINEAR	PHO	2.8 km	MPC · JPL
282478	2004 JP_{11}	—	May 13, 2004	Socorro	LINEAR	PHO	1.1 km	MPC · JPL
282479	2004 KL_{10}	—	May 21, 2004	Socorro	LINEAR	·	890 m	MPC · JPL
282480	2004 KW_{10}	—	May 19, 2004	Kitt Peak	Spacewatch	·	4.4 km	MPC · JPL
282481	2004 KO_{12}	—	May 22, 2004	Catalina	CSS	·	980 m	MPC · JPL
282482	2004 LP_{16}	—	June 12, 2004	Siding Spring	SSS	PHO	1.7 km	MPC · JPL
282483	2004 MG_{6}	—	June 19, 2004	Catalina	CSS	·	1.2 km	MPC · JPL
282484	2004 NL_{5}	—	July 10, 2004	Catalina	CSS	PHO	1.7 km	MPC · JPL
282485	2004 NQ_{13}	—	July 11, 2004	Socorro	LINEAR	·	1.1 km	MPC · JPL
282486	2004 NL_{18}	—	July 14, 2004	Socorro	LINEAR	V	990 m	MPC · JPL
282487	2004 NW_{19}	—	July 14, 2004	Socorro	LINEAR	·	1.2 km	MPC · JPL
282488	2004 NW_{32}	—	July 11, 2004	Socorro	LINEAR	·	1.5 km	MPC · JPL
282489	2004 OL_{1}	—	July 16, 2004	Socorro	LINEAR	·	2.8 km	MPC · JPL
282490	2004 PY_{5}	—	August 6, 2004	Palomar	NEAT	·	1.1 km	MPC · JPL
282491	2004 PC_{9}	—	August 6, 2004	Palomar	NEAT	NYS	1.3 km	MPC · JPL
282492	2004 PE_{11}	—	August 7, 2004	Palomar	NEAT	·	4.2 km	MPC · JPL
282493	2004 PB_{15}	—	August 7, 2004	Palomar	NEAT	·	2.0 km	MPC · JPL
282494	2004 PZ_{26}	—	August 8, 2004	Siding Spring	SSS	H	700 m	MPC · JPL
282495	2004 PK_{34}	—	August 8, 2004	Anderson Mesa	LONEOS	·	1.2 km	MPC · JPL
282496	2004 PW_{40}	—	August 9, 2004	Socorro	LINEAR	·	1.4 km	MPC · JPL
282497	2004 PC_{43}	—	August 5, 2004	Palomar	NEAT	THB	3.4 km	MPC · JPL
282498	2004 PA_{54}	—	August 8, 2004	Anderson Mesa	LONEOS	·	980 m	MPC · JPL
282499	2004 PE_{55}	—	August 8, 2004	Palomar	NEAT	·	1.9 km	MPC · JPL
282500	2004 PL_{62}	—	August 10, 2004	Campo Imperatore	CINEOS	NYS	1.3 km	MPC · JPL

== 282501–282600 ==
back to top

Designation			Discovery			Properties		Ref
Permanent	Provisional	Named after	Date	Site	Discoverer(s)	Category	Diam.	Ref
282501	2004 PJ_{64}	—	August 10, 2004	Socorro	LINEAR	·	2.7 km	MPC · JPL
282502	2004 PK_{83}	—	August 10, 2004	Socorro	LINEAR	PHO	1.1 km	MPC · JPL
282503	2004 PM_{94}	—	August 10, 2004	Socorro	LINEAR	PHO	1.1 km	MPC · JPL
282504	2004 PA_{101}	—	August 11, 2004	Socorro	LINEAR	V	910 m	MPC · JPL
282505	2004 PA_{102}	—	August 11, 2004	Socorro	LINEAR	NYS	1.7 km	MPC · JPL
282506	2004 PD_{102}	—	August 11, 2004	Siding Spring	SSS	·	3.4 km	MPC · JPL
282507	2004 PW_{102}	—	August 12, 2004	Socorro	LINEAR	·	1.5 km	MPC · JPL
282508	2004 PZ_{112}	—	August 15, 2004	Palomar	NEAT	·	1.3 km	MPC · JPL
282509	2004 PL_{114}	—	August 9, 2004	Socorro	LINEAR	·	1.9 km	MPC · JPL
282510	2004 QJ_{10}	—	August 21, 2004	Siding Spring	SSS	·	1.9 km	MPC · JPL
282511	2004 QL_{20}	—	August 25, 2004	Socorro	LINEAR	·	1.7 km	MPC · JPL
282512	2004 QU_{27}	—	August 20, 2004	Kitt Peak	Spacewatch	HYG	2.6 km	MPC · JPL
282513	2004 RR_{7}	—	September 6, 2004	Palomar	NEAT	·	1.6 km	MPC · JPL
282514	2004 RN_{45}	—	September 8, 2004	Socorro	LINEAR	MAS	790 m	MPC · JPL
282515	2004 RY_{46}	—	September 8, 2004	Socorro	LINEAR	·	1.2 km	MPC · JPL
282516	2004 RH_{48}	—	September 8, 2004	Socorro	LINEAR	NYS	1.3 km	MPC · JPL
282517	2004 RT_{54}	—	September 8, 2004	Socorro	LINEAR	ERI	2.4 km	MPC · JPL
282518	2004 RX_{66}	—	September 8, 2004	Socorro	LINEAR	·	1.3 km	MPC · JPL
282519	2004 RA_{75}	—	September 8, 2004	Socorro	LINEAR	MAS	970 m	MPC · JPL
282520	2004 RW_{79}	—	September 7, 2004	Socorro	LINEAR	·	1.7 km	MPC · JPL
282521	2004 RV_{85}	—	September 6, 2004	Siding Spring	SSS	V	690 m	MPC · JPL
282522	2004 RP_{97}	—	September 8, 2004	Socorro	LINEAR	·	1.7 km	MPC · JPL
282523	2004 RX_{103}	—	September 8, 2004	Palomar	NEAT	·	1.0 km	MPC · JPL
282524	2004 RJ_{155}	—	September 10, 2004	Socorro	LINEAR	(2076)	1.0 km	MPC · JPL
282525	2004 RS_{169}	—	September 8, 2004	Socorro	LINEAR	NYS	1.1 km	MPC · JPL
282526	2004 RF_{180}	—	September 10, 2004	Socorro	LINEAR	·	1.5 km	MPC · JPL
282527	2004 RK_{180}	—	September 10, 2004	Socorro	LINEAR	V	1.0 km	MPC · JPL
282528	2004 RK_{194}	—	September 10, 2004	Socorro	LINEAR	·	1.7 km	MPC · JPL
282529	2004 RG_{195}	—	September 10, 2004	Socorro	LINEAR	·	1.7 km	MPC · JPL
282530	2004 RV_{203}	—	September 12, 2004	Palomar	NEAT	PHO	2.2 km	MPC · JPL
282531	2004 RR_{215}	—	September 11, 2004	Socorro	LINEAR	·	1.4 km	MPC · JPL
282532	2004 RM_{224}	—	September 8, 2004	Palomar	NEAT	·	1.2 km	MPC · JPL
282533	2004 RU_{234}	—	September 10, 2004	Kitt Peak	Spacewatch	·	840 m	MPC · JPL
282534	2004 RD_{248}	—	September 12, 2004	Socorro	LINEAR	PHO	1.3 km	MPC · JPL
282535	2004 RF_{257}	—	September 9, 2004	Socorro	LINEAR	NYS	1.4 km	MPC · JPL
282536	2004 RZ_{260}	—	September 10, 2004	Kitt Peak	Spacewatch	·	1.6 km	MPC · JPL
282537	2004 RF_{277}	—	September 13, 2004	Kitt Peak	Spacewatch	·	1.4 km	MPC · JPL
282538	2004 RX_{289}	—	September 9, 2004	Socorro	LINEAR	·	1.0 km	MPC · JPL
282539	2004 RC_{316}	—	September 8, 2004	Bergisch Gladbach	W. Bickel	·	4.4 km	MPC · JPL
282540	2004 RE_{325}	—	September 13, 2004	Socorro	LINEAR	·	1.4 km	MPC · JPL
282541	2004 ST_{13}	—	September 17, 2004	Socorro	LINEAR	·	1.2 km	MPC · JPL
282542	2004 SB_{59}	—	September 17, 2004	Socorro	LINEAR	·	1.4 km	MPC · JPL
282543	2004 ST_{60}	—	September 21, 2004	Anderson Mesa	LONEOS	EUN	1.7 km	MPC · JPL
282544	2004 TB_{54}	—	October 4, 2004	Kitt Peak	Spacewatch	·	2.1 km	MPC · JPL
282545	2004 TL_{68}	—	October 5, 2004	Anderson Mesa	LONEOS	·	2.7 km	MPC · JPL
282546	2004 TG_{121}	—	October 7, 2004	Anderson Mesa	LONEOS	V	920 m	MPC · JPL
282547	2004 TE_{131}	—	October 7, 2004	Anderson Mesa	LONEOS	·	1.4 km	MPC · JPL
282548	2004 TV_{160}	—	October 6, 2004	Kitt Peak	Spacewatch	NYS	1.2 km	MPC · JPL
282549	2004 TN_{199}	—	October 7, 2004	Kitt Peak	Spacewatch	·	1.4 km	MPC · JPL
282550	2004 TX_{199}	—	October 7, 2004	Kitt Peak	Spacewatch	·	2.4 km	MPC · JPL
282551	2004 TG_{215}	—	October 10, 2004	Kitt Peak	Spacewatch	·	2.9 km	MPC · JPL
282552	2004 TV_{328}	—	October 4, 2004	Palomar	NEAT	V	830 m	MPC · JPL
282553	2004 TF_{346}	—	October 15, 2004	Kitt Peak	Spacewatch	·	1.9 km	MPC · JPL
282554	2004 TH_{356}	—	October 13, 2004	Anderson Mesa	LONEOS	(194)	2.0 km	MPC · JPL
282555	2004 TU_{356}	—	October 14, 2004	Anderson Mesa	LONEOS	·	2.0 km	MPC · JPL
282556	2004 UN_{9}	—	October 16, 2004	Socorro	LINEAR	PHO	1.1 km	MPC · JPL
282557	2004 VM_{11}	—	November 3, 2004	Palomar	NEAT	·	2.0 km	MPC · JPL
282558	2004 VK_{28}	—	November 7, 2004	Socorro	LINEAR	·	3.9 km	MPC · JPL
282559	2004 WS_{6}	—	November 19, 2004	Socorro	LINEAR	·	1.2 km	MPC · JPL
282560	2004 XW_{35}	—	December 9, 2004	Vail-Jarnac	Jarnac	H	820 m	MPC · JPL
282561	2004 XO_{61}	—	December 2, 2004	Socorro	LINEAR	·	5.1 km	MPC · JPL
282562	2004 XO_{66}	—	December 3, 2004	Kitt Peak	Spacewatch	GEF	1.8 km	MPC · JPL
282563	2004 XR_{68}	—	December 7, 2004	Socorro	LINEAR	EUN	1.5 km	MPC · JPL
282564	2004 XE_{80}	—	December 10, 2004	Anderson Mesa	LONEOS	·	1.8 km	MPC · JPL
282565	2004 XZ_{80}	—	December 10, 2004	Socorro	LINEAR	·	2.1 km	MPC · JPL
282566	2004 XY_{90}	—	December 11, 2004	Kitt Peak	Spacewatch	·	2.8 km	MPC · JPL
282567	2004 XH_{95}	—	December 11, 2004	Kitt Peak	Spacewatch	·	2.4 km	MPC · JPL
282568	2004 YJ_{14}	—	December 18, 2004	Mount Lemmon	Mount Lemmon Survey	·	2.5 km	MPC · JPL
282569	2004 YF_{24}	—	December 16, 2004	Kitt Peak	Spacewatch	·	2.3 km	MPC · JPL
282570	2005 AT_{28}	—	January 15, 2005	Socorro	LINEAR	H	620 m	MPC · JPL
282571	2005 AX_{34}	—	January 13, 2005	Socorro	LINEAR	·	2.7 km	MPC · JPL
282572	2005 AH_{38}	—	January 13, 2005	Catalina	CSS	·	2.5 km	MPC · JPL
282573	2005 AE_{40}	—	January 15, 2005	Socorro	LINEAR	·	2.5 km	MPC · JPL
282574	2005 AB_{41}	—	January 15, 2005	Socorro	LINEAR	·	2.1 km	MPC · JPL
282575	2005 AM_{55}	—	January 15, 2005	Socorro	LINEAR	·	2.6 km	MPC · JPL
282576	2005 AP_{55}	—	January 15, 2005	Socorro	LINEAR	·	880 m	MPC · JPL
282577	2005 CU	—	February 1, 2005	Catalina	CSS	·	2.4 km	MPC · JPL
282578	2005 CG_{4}	—	February 1, 2005	Kitt Peak	Spacewatch	H	850 m	MPC · JPL
282579	2005 CU_{13}	—	February 2, 2005	Kitt Peak	Spacewatch	·	3.7 km	MPC · JPL
282580	2005 CQ_{15}	—	February 2, 2005	Catalina	CSS	·	3.1 km	MPC · JPL
282581	2005 CS_{61}	—	February 9, 2005	Socorro	LINEAR	H	730 m	MPC · JPL
282582	2005 EG_{102}	—	March 3, 2005	Catalina	CSS	·	3.5 km	MPC · JPL
282583	2005 EW_{138}	—	March 9, 2005	Mount Lemmon	Mount Lemmon Survey	·	3.1 km	MPC · JPL
282584	2005 EV_{145}	—	March 10, 2005	Mount Lemmon	Mount Lemmon Survey	·	2.1 km	MPC · JPL
282585	2005 ED_{146}	—	March 10, 2005	Mount Lemmon	Mount Lemmon Survey	EOS	2.0 km	MPC · JPL
282586	2005 EX_{171}	—	March 7, 2005	Socorro	LINEAR	·	3.3 km	MPC · JPL
282587	2005 EW_{173}	—	March 8, 2005	Kitt Peak	Spacewatch	·	3.2 km	MPC · JPL
282588	2005 EX_{174}	—	March 8, 2005	Socorro	LINEAR	NEM	2.9 km	MPC · JPL
282589	2005 EP_{203}	—	March 11, 2005	Kitt Peak	Spacewatch	·	2.9 km	MPC · JPL
282590	2005 EU_{217}	—	March 9, 2005	Mount Lemmon	Mount Lemmon Survey	·	4.3 km	MPC · JPL
282591	2005 EC_{236}	—	March 10, 2005	Mount Lemmon	Mount Lemmon Survey	·	2.5 km	MPC · JPL
282592	2005 EL_{252}	—	March 10, 2005	Mount Lemmon	Mount Lemmon Survey	·	3.3 km	MPC · JPL
282593	2005 EQ_{264}	—	March 13, 2005	Kitt Peak	Spacewatch	·	2.3 km	MPC · JPL
282594	2005 EF_{275}	—	March 8, 2005	Anderson Mesa	LONEOS	KOR	2.0 km	MPC · JPL
282595	2005 FU_{1}	—	March 16, 2005	Mount Lemmon	Mount Lemmon Survey	·	2.9 km	MPC · JPL
282596	2005 FG_{6}	—	March 31, 2005	Anderson Mesa	LONEOS	EOS	2.8 km	MPC · JPL
282597	2005 GK_{31}	—	April 4, 2005	Catalina	CSS	·	2.8 km	MPC · JPL
282598	2005 GF_{50}	—	April 5, 2005	Mount Lemmon	Mount Lemmon Survey	EOS	2.3 km	MPC · JPL
282599	2005 GX_{55}	—	April 6, 2005	Mount Lemmon	Mount Lemmon Survey	·	2.8 km	MPC · JPL
282600	2005 GR_{82}	—	April 4, 2005	Mount Lemmon	Mount Lemmon Survey	BRA	2.1 km	MPC · JPL

== 282601–282700 ==
back to top

Designation			Discovery			Properties		Ref
Permanent	Provisional	Named after	Date	Site	Discoverer(s)	Category	Diam.	Ref
282601	2005 GA_{94}	—	April 6, 2005	Catalina	CSS	·	3.8 km	MPC · JPL
282602	2005 GY_{114}	—	April 10, 2005	Mount Lemmon	Mount Lemmon Survey	·	3.6 km	MPC · JPL
282603	2005 GP_{130}	—	April 8, 2005	Socorro	LINEAR	·	3.6 km	MPC · JPL
282604	2005 GQ_{151}	—	April 12, 2005	Mount Lemmon	Mount Lemmon Survey	·	3.6 km	MPC · JPL
282605	2005 GA_{153}	—	April 13, 2005	Anderson Mesa	LONEOS	·	5.2 km	MPC · JPL
282606	2005 GW_{154}	—	April 10, 2005	Mount Lemmon	Mount Lemmon Survey	·	5.2 km	MPC · JPL
282607	2005 GR_{163}	—	April 10, 2005	Mount Lemmon	Mount Lemmon Survey	·	3.5 km	MPC · JPL
282608	2005 GN_{177}	—	April 15, 2005	Kitt Peak	Spacewatch	·	3.2 km	MPC · JPL
282609	2005 JN_{2}	—	May 3, 2005	Kitt Peak	Spacewatch	·	4.0 km	MPC · JPL
282610	2005 JV_{20}	—	May 4, 2005	Catalina	CSS	·	2.6 km	MPC · JPL
282611	2005 JH_{24}	—	May 3, 2005	Kitt Peak	Spacewatch	VER	3.2 km	MPC · JPL
282612	2005 JQ_{31}	—	May 4, 2005	Palomar	NEAT	·	3.9 km	MPC · JPL
282613	2005 JA_{33}	—	May 4, 2005	Catalina	CSS	·	4.0 km	MPC · JPL
282614	2005 JZ_{37}	—	May 6, 2005	Mount Lemmon	Mount Lemmon Survey	·	3.1 km	MPC · JPL
282615	2005 JH_{44}	—	May 7, 2005	Mount Lemmon	Mount Lemmon Survey	·	4.6 km	MPC · JPL
282616	2005 JZ_{51}	—	May 4, 2005	Kitt Peak	Spacewatch	·	3.4 km	MPC · JPL
282617	2005 JK_{99}	—	May 9, 2005	Kitt Peak	Spacewatch	·	3.3 km	MPC · JPL
282618	2005 JZ_{99}	—	May 9, 2005	Kitt Peak	Spacewatch	·	3.5 km	MPC · JPL
282619	2005 JM_{100}	—	May 9, 2005	Kitt Peak	Spacewatch	·	3.5 km	MPC · JPL
282620	2005 JK_{135}	—	May 14, 2005	Mount Lemmon	Mount Lemmon Survey	·	4.2 km	MPC · JPL
282621	2005 JG_{157}	—	May 4, 2005	Kitt Peak	Spacewatch	THB	4.7 km	MPC · JPL
282622	2005 KH_{7}	—	May 19, 2005	Palomar	NEAT	URS	4.0 km	MPC · JPL
282623	2005 LR_{19}	—	June 8, 2005	Kitt Peak	Spacewatch	·	3.8 km	MPC · JPL
282624	2005 LN_{20}	—	June 4, 2005	Kitt Peak	Spacewatch	·	1.1 km	MPC · JPL
282625	2005 LL_{28}	—	June 9, 2005	Kitt Peak	Spacewatch	·	4.3 km	MPC · JPL
282626	2005 MQ_{4}	—	June 17, 2005	Kitt Peak	Spacewatch	·	3.5 km	MPC · JPL
282627	2005 PO_{24}	—	August 10, 2005	Cerro Tololo	M. W. Buie	·	1.7 km	MPC · JPL
282628	2005 QC_{104}	—	August 27, 2005	Palomar	NEAT	·	2.8 km	MPC · JPL
282629	2005 QY_{182}	—	August 27, 2005	Palomar	NEAT	·	770 m	MPC · JPL
282630 Caroljones	2005 RL_{50}	Caroljones	September 3, 2005	Mauna Kea	P. A. Wiegert	·	4.6 km	MPC · JPL
282631	2005 SV_{1}	—	September 23, 2005	Ondřejov	P. Kušnirák	EOS	2.8 km	MPC · JPL
282632	2005 SE_{34}	—	September 23, 2005	Kitt Peak	Spacewatch	·	920 m	MPC · JPL
282633	2005 SG_{208}	—	September 30, 2005	Kitt Peak	Spacewatch	EUN	1.5 km	MPC · JPL
282634	2005 SQ_{263}	—	September 23, 2005	Kitt Peak	Spacewatch	·	1.2 km	MPC · JPL
282635	2005 SK_{276}	—	September 29, 2005	Kitt Peak	Spacewatch	·	1.8 km	MPC · JPL
282636	2005 SH_{293}	—	September 23, 2005	Anderson Mesa	LONEOS	·	2.6 km	MPC · JPL
282637	2005 TT_{1}	—	October 1, 2005	Catalina	CSS	GEF	1.7 km	MPC · JPL
282638	2005 TY_{11}	—	October 1, 2005	Catalina	CSS	·	2.5 km	MPC · JPL
282639	2005 TC_{46}	—	October 9, 2005	Ottmarsheim	Ottmarsheim	·	910 m	MPC · JPL
282640	2005 TG_{63}	—	October 4, 2005	Mount Lemmon	Mount Lemmon Survey	·	1.3 km	MPC · JPL
282641	2005 TK_{74}	—	October 7, 2005	Anderson Mesa	LONEOS	·	3.3 km	MPC · JPL
282642	2005 TB_{100}	—	October 7, 2005	Socorro	LINEAR	·	1.9 km	MPC · JPL
282643	2005 TQ_{104}	—	October 8, 2005	Catalina	CSS	KRM	3.0 km	MPC · JPL
282644	2005 TN_{138}	—	October 7, 2005	Catalina	CSS	·	4.7 km	MPC · JPL
282645	2005 TA_{172}	—	October 10, 2005	Kitt Peak	Spacewatch	H	750 m	MPC · JPL
282646	2005 UR_{17}	—	October 22, 2005	Kitt Peak	Spacewatch	·	4.8 km	MPC · JPL
282647	2005 UB_{53}	—	October 23, 2005	Catalina	CSS	·	930 m	MPC · JPL
282648	2005 UM_{60}	—	October 25, 2005	Catalina	CSS	·	1.1 km	MPC · JPL
282649	2005 UP_{98}	—	October 22, 2005	Kitt Peak	Spacewatch	·	760 m	MPC · JPL
282650	2005 UF_{99}	—	October 22, 2005	Kitt Peak	Spacewatch	·	1.6 km	MPC · JPL
282651	2005 UU_{106}	—	October 22, 2005	Kitt Peak	Spacewatch	·	1.4 km	MPC · JPL
282652	2005 UP_{113}	—	October 22, 2005	Kitt Peak	Spacewatch	·	2.8 km	MPC · JPL
282653	2005 UO_{141}	—	October 25, 2005	Catalina	CSS	·	800 m	MPC · JPL
282654	2005 UF_{156}	—	October 26, 2005	Catalina	CSS	·	1.9 km	MPC · JPL
282655	2005 US_{166}	—	October 24, 2005	Kitt Peak	Spacewatch	·	1.3 km	MPC · JPL
282656	2005 UU_{198}	—	October 25, 2005	Mount Lemmon	Mount Lemmon Survey	·	900 m	MPC · JPL
282657	2005 UW_{312}	—	October 29, 2005	Catalina	CSS	·	1.0 km	MPC · JPL
282658	2005 UJ_{347}	—	October 30, 2005	Kitt Peak	Spacewatch	NYS	1.6 km	MPC · JPL
282659	2005 UD_{352}	—	October 29, 2005	Catalina	CSS	·	1.0 km	MPC · JPL
282660	2005 UR_{353}	—	October 29, 2005	Catalina	CSS	·	2.9 km	MPC · JPL
282661	2005 UN_{393}	—	October 27, 2005	Anderson Mesa	LONEOS	·	1.1 km	MPC · JPL
282662	2005 UJ_{399}	—	October 31, 2005	Catalina	CSS	·	3.0 km	MPC · JPL
282663	2005 UE_{405}	—	October 29, 2005	Mount Lemmon	Mount Lemmon Survey	·	720 m	MPC · JPL
282664	2005 UL_{436}	—	October 30, 2005	Mount Lemmon	Mount Lemmon Survey	·	1.4 km	MPC · JPL
282665	2005 UT_{469}	—	October 30, 2005	Kitt Peak	Spacewatch	·	4.5 km	MPC · JPL
282666	2005 UE_{479}	—	October 29, 2005	Mount Lemmon	Mount Lemmon Survey	·	4.1 km	MPC · JPL
282667	2005 UF_{513}	—	October 26, 2005	Kitt Peak	Spacewatch	·	890 m	MPC · JPL
282668	2005 UK_{521}	—	October 26, 2005	Apache Point	A. C. Becker	·	770 m	MPC · JPL
282669 Erguël	2005 VD_{4}	Erguël	November 6, 2005	Nogales	M. Ory	·	1.2 km	MPC · JPL
282670	2005 VP_{67}	—	November 1, 2005	Mount Lemmon	Mount Lemmon Survey	·	660 m	MPC · JPL
282671	2005 VC_{95}	—	November 6, 2005	Kitt Peak	Spacewatch	EOS	2.6 km	MPC · JPL
282672	2005 WZ_{2}	—	November 20, 2005	Palomar	NEAT	(883)	900 m	MPC · JPL
282673	2005 WX_{7}	—	November 21, 2005	Catalina	CSS	·	1.0 km	MPC · JPL
282674	2005 WF_{44}	—	November 21, 2005	Kitt Peak	Spacewatch	·	3.7 km	MPC · JPL
282675	2005 WX_{73}	—	November 26, 2005	Catalina	CSS	·	2.9 km	MPC · JPL
282676	2005 WO_{93}	—	November 25, 2005	Mount Lemmon	Mount Lemmon Survey	·	680 m	MPC · JPL
282677	2005 WN_{105}	—	November 29, 2005	Socorro	LINEAR	·	3.5 km	MPC · JPL
282678	2005 WG_{110}	—	November 30, 2005	Kitt Peak	Spacewatch	·	2.4 km	MPC · JPL
282679	2005 WG_{119}	—	November 28, 2005	Socorro	LINEAR	·	4.4 km	MPC · JPL
282680	2005 WM_{179}	—	November 21, 2005	Anderson Mesa	LONEOS	EOS	2.7 km	MPC · JPL
282681	2005 WG_{180}	—	November 21, 2005	Catalina	CSS	EOS	2.7 km	MPC · JPL
282682	2005 WN_{180}	—	November 22, 2005	Needville	J. Dellinger	·	1.0 km	MPC · JPL
282683	2005 XT_{2}	—	December 1, 2005	Kitt Peak	Spacewatch	·	930 m	MPC · JPL
282684	2005 XB_{19}	—	December 1, 2005	Socorro	LINEAR	·	1.6 km	MPC · JPL
282685	2005 XC_{24}	—	December 2, 2005	Socorro	LINEAR	·	1.3 km	MPC · JPL
282686	2005 XB_{31}	—	December 1, 2005	Socorro	LINEAR	·	1.7 km	MPC · JPL
282687	2005 YW_{27}	—	December 22, 2005	Kitt Peak	Spacewatch	·	1.7 km	MPC · JPL
282688	2005 YJ_{32}	—	December 22, 2005	Kitt Peak	Spacewatch	EOS	2.2 km	MPC · JPL
282689	2005 YO_{53}	—	December 22, 2005	Kitt Peak	Spacewatch	·	1.4 km	MPC · JPL
282690	2005 YN_{90}	—	December 26, 2005	Mount Lemmon	Mount Lemmon Survey	·	2.0 km	MPC · JPL
282691	2005 YM_{164}	—	December 29, 2005	Kitt Peak	Spacewatch	V	910 m	MPC · JPL
282692	2005 YZ_{176}	—	December 22, 2005	Kitt Peak	Spacewatch	·	1.4 km	MPC · JPL
282693	2005 YD_{270}	—	December 26, 2005	Mount Lemmon	Mount Lemmon Survey	·	2.1 km	MPC · JPL
282694	2006 AO_{5}	—	January 2, 2006	Catalina	CSS	H	900 m	MPC · JPL
282695	2006 AJ_{22}	—	January 5, 2006	Catalina	CSS	·	3.8 km	MPC · JPL
282696	2006 AD_{62}	—	January 5, 2006	Kitt Peak	Spacewatch	·	1.3 km	MPC · JPL
282697	2006 AS_{86}	—	January 6, 2006	Anderson Mesa	LONEOS	·	2.9 km	MPC · JPL
282698	2006 BF_{27}	—	January 20, 2006	Kitt Peak	Spacewatch	·	1.6 km	MPC · JPL
282699	2006 BY_{37}	—	January 23, 2006	Catalina	CSS	·	2.2 km	MPC · JPL
282700	2006 BS_{43}	—	January 23, 2006	Catalina	CSS	·	4.8 km	MPC · JPL

== 282701–282800 ==
back to top

Designation			Discovery			Properties		Ref
Permanent	Provisional	Named after	Date	Site	Discoverer(s)	Category	Diam.	Ref
282701	2006 BD_{65}	—	January 22, 2006	Mount Lemmon	Mount Lemmon Survey	·	3.2 km	MPC · JPL
282702	2006 BL_{74}	—	January 23, 2006	Kitt Peak	Spacewatch	·	2.1 km	MPC · JPL
282703	2006 BF_{77}	—	January 23, 2006	Mount Lemmon	Mount Lemmon Survey	NYS	1.5 km	MPC · JPL
282704	2006 BJ_{79}	—	January 23, 2006	Kitt Peak	Spacewatch	GEF	1.7 km	MPC · JPL
282705	2006 BD_{96}	—	January 26, 2006	Kitt Peak	Spacewatch	·	1.7 km	MPC · JPL
282706	2006 BZ_{96}	—	January 26, 2006	Mount Lemmon	Mount Lemmon Survey	·	2.0 km	MPC · JPL
282707	2006 BK_{115}	—	January 26, 2006	Kitt Peak	Spacewatch	(5)	1.7 km	MPC · JPL
282708	2006 BC_{122}	—	January 26, 2006	Kitt Peak	Spacewatch	·	1.4 km	MPC · JPL
282709	2006 BC_{153}	—	January 25, 2006	Kitt Peak	Spacewatch	·	1.5 km	MPC · JPL
282710	2006 BD_{156}	—	January 25, 2006	Kitt Peak	Spacewatch	·	3.4 km	MPC · JPL
282711	2006 BX_{193}	—	January 30, 2006	Kitt Peak	Spacewatch	L5	8.7 km	MPC · JPL
282712	2006 BN_{199}	—	January 30, 2006	Kitt Peak	Spacewatch	·	1.5 km	MPC · JPL
282713	2006 BP_{231}	—	January 31, 2006	Kitt Peak	Spacewatch	·	1.7 km	MPC · JPL
282714	2006 BW_{244}	—	January 31, 2006	Kitt Peak	Spacewatch	·	1.9 km	MPC · JPL
282715	2006 BG_{249}	—	January 31, 2006	Kitt Peak	Spacewatch	·	1.7 km	MPC · JPL
282716	2006 BV_{257}	—	January 31, 2006	Kitt Peak	Spacewatch	·	1.5 km	MPC · JPL
282717	2006 BZ_{264}	—	January 31, 2006	Kitt Peak	Spacewatch	·	3.9 km	MPC · JPL
282718	2006 BH_{265}	—	January 31, 2006	Kitt Peak	Spacewatch	·	1.8 km	MPC · JPL
282719	2006 BP_{270}	—	January 31, 2006	Catalina	CSS	·	1.7 km	MPC · JPL
282720	2006 CD_{34}	—	February 2, 2006	Mount Lemmon	Mount Lemmon Survey	·	2.3 km	MPC · JPL
282721	2006 CX_{65}	—	February 4, 2006	Mount Lemmon	Mount Lemmon Survey	·	1.5 km	MPC · JPL
282722	2006 DD_{15}	—	February 20, 2006	Kitt Peak	Spacewatch	(5)	1.5 km	MPC · JPL
282723	2006 DD_{39}	—	February 21, 2006	Mount Lemmon	Mount Lemmon Survey	·	1.9 km	MPC · JPL
282724	2006 DV_{46}	—	February 20, 2006	Kitt Peak	Spacewatch	·	1.6 km	MPC · JPL
282725	2006 DF_{57}	—	February 24, 2006	Catalina	CSS	·	3.3 km	MPC · JPL
282726	2006 DU_{57}	—	February 24, 2006	Mount Lemmon	Mount Lemmon Survey	·	3.6 km	MPC · JPL
282727	2006 DG_{71}	—	February 21, 2006	Mount Lemmon	Mount Lemmon Survey	·	2.1 km	MPC · JPL
282728	2006 DK_{76}	—	February 24, 2006	Kitt Peak	Spacewatch	·	1.6 km	MPC · JPL
282729	2006 DR_{78}	—	February 24, 2006	Kitt Peak	Spacewatch	·	1.5 km	MPC · JPL
282730	2006 DB_{91}	—	February 24, 2006	Kitt Peak	Spacewatch	·	1.9 km	MPC · JPL
282731	2006 DL_{119}	—	February 20, 2006	Socorro	LINEAR	·	2.3 km	MPC · JPL
282732	2006 DO_{130}	—	February 25, 2006	Mount Lemmon	Mount Lemmon Survey	·	2.8 km	MPC · JPL
282733	2006 DA_{140}	—	February 25, 2006	Kitt Peak	Spacewatch	·	1.9 km	MPC · JPL
282734	2006 DC_{196}	—	February 21, 2006	Catalina	CSS	·	2.0 km	MPC · JPL
282735	2006 DK_{198}	—	February 26, 2006	Catalina	CSS	·	1.6 km	MPC · JPL
282736	2006 DG_{200}	—	February 24, 2006	Catalina	CSS	·	2.7 km	MPC · JPL
282737	2006 DO_{204}	—	February 25, 2006	Catalina	CSS	·	4.0 km	MPC · JPL
282738	2006 DJ_{206}	—	February 25, 2006	Kitt Peak	Spacewatch	·	1.6 km	MPC · JPL
282739	2006 DY_{213}	—	February 25, 2006	Catalina	CSS	EUP	5.6 km	MPC · JPL
282740	2006 DR_{214}	—	February 24, 2006	Kitt Peak	Spacewatch	·	4.7 km	MPC · JPL
282741	2006 DD_{217}	—	February 27, 2006	Kitt Peak	Spacewatch	·	2.5 km	MPC · JPL
282742	2006 ET_{39}	—	March 4, 2006	Mount Lemmon	Mount Lemmon Survey	·	2.0 km	MPC · JPL
282743	2006 EZ_{51}	—	March 4, 2006	Kitt Peak	Spacewatch	·	2.4 km	MPC · JPL
282744	2006 EY_{70}	—	March 3, 2006	Catalina	CSS	·	3.3 km	MPC · JPL
282745	2006 FL_{7}	—	March 23, 2006	Kitt Peak	Spacewatch	·	2.3 km	MPC · JPL
282746	2006 FO_{27}	—	March 24, 2006	Mount Lemmon	Mount Lemmon Survey	·	2.2 km	MPC · JPL
282747	2006 FL_{46}	—	March 31, 2006	Anderson Mesa	LONEOS	THB	3.7 km	MPC · JPL
282748	2006 GA_{3}	—	April 2, 2006	Schiaparelli	Schiaparelli	·	2.3 km	MPC · JPL
282749	2006 GN_{35}	—	April 7, 2006	Catalina	CSS	·	2.5 km	MPC · JPL
282750	2006 GO_{39}	—	April 2, 2006	Anderson Mesa	LONEOS	·	2.5 km	MPC · JPL
282751	2006 GW_{41}	—	April 7, 2006	Anderson Mesa	LONEOS	(18466)	3.3 km	MPC · JPL
282752	2006 GE_{49}	—	April 2, 2006	Anderson Mesa	LONEOS	·	3.5 km	MPC · JPL
282753	2006 GK_{50}	—	April 9, 2006	Anderson Mesa	LONEOS	·	2.7 km	MPC · JPL
282754	2006 HF_{13}	—	April 19, 2006	Kitt Peak	Spacewatch	·	2.6 km	MPC · JPL
282755	2006 HL_{14}	—	April 19, 2006	Mount Lemmon	Mount Lemmon Survey	·	1.7 km	MPC · JPL
282756	2006 HX_{17}	—	April 21, 2006	Reedy Creek	J. Broughton	JUN	1.8 km	MPC · JPL
282757	2006 HE_{26}	—	April 20, 2006	Kitt Peak	Spacewatch	·	1.7 km	MPC · JPL
282758	2006 HK_{27}	—	April 20, 2006	Mount Lemmon	Mount Lemmon Survey	·	2.7 km	MPC · JPL
282759	2006 HO_{31}	—	April 18, 2006	Kitt Peak	Spacewatch	·	2.8 km	MPC · JPL
282760	2006 HB_{37}	—	April 21, 2006	Kitt Peak	Spacewatch	·	3.3 km	MPC · JPL
282761	2006 HU_{49}	—	April 26, 2006	Kitt Peak	Spacewatch	·	2.3 km	MPC · JPL
282762	2006 HV_{49}	—	April 26, 2006	Kitt Peak	Spacewatch	·	760 m	MPC · JPL
282763	2006 HA_{68}	—	April 24, 2006	Mount Lemmon	Mount Lemmon Survey	·	2.5 km	MPC · JPL
282764	2006 HT_{71}	—	April 25, 2006	Kitt Peak	Spacewatch	·	2.5 km	MPC · JPL
282765	2006 HT_{79}	—	April 26, 2006	Kitt Peak	Spacewatch	·	2.3 km	MPC · JPL
282766	2006 HV_{79}	—	April 26, 2006	Kitt Peak	Spacewatch	·	2.0 km	MPC · JPL
282767	2006 HT_{103}	—	April 30, 2006	Kitt Peak	Spacewatch	·	3.3 km	MPC · JPL
282768	2006 HZ_{105}	—	April 29, 2006	Siding Spring	SSS	·	4.2 km	MPC · JPL
282769	2006 HC_{106}	—	April 30, 2006	Kitt Peak	Spacewatch	GEF	1.5 km	MPC · JPL
282770	2006 HY_{151}	—	April 19, 2006	Kitt Peak	Spacewatch	·	2.2 km	MPC · JPL
282771	2006 JF_{26}	—	May 3, 2006	Reedy Creek	J. Broughton	·	2.9 km	MPC · JPL
282772	2006 JU_{27}	—	May 2, 2006	Mount Lemmon	Mount Lemmon Survey	EUN	1.4 km	MPC · JPL
282773	2006 JG_{48}	—	May 5, 2006	Anderson Mesa	LONEOS	·	1.7 km	MPC · JPL
282774	2006 JA_{49}	—	May 14, 2006	Palomar	NEAT	·	1.9 km	MPC · JPL
282775	2006 JO_{55}	—	May 1, 2006	Catalina	CSS	EUN	1.8 km	MPC · JPL
282776	2006 JB_{57}	—	May 11, 2006	Palomar	NEAT	·	4.3 km	MPC · JPL
282777	2006 KP_{11}	—	May 19, 2006	Palomar	NEAT	·	980 m	MPC · JPL
282778	2006 KH_{12}	—	May 20, 2006	Kitt Peak	Spacewatch	·	2.5 km	MPC · JPL
282779	2006 KZ_{13}	—	May 20, 2006	Kitt Peak	Spacewatch	·	5.9 km	MPC · JPL
282780	2006 KL_{16}	—	May 21, 2006	Kitt Peak	Spacewatch	·	3.1 km	MPC · JPL
282781	2006 KO_{16}	—	May 21, 2006	Catalina	CSS	·	3.7 km	MPC · JPL
282782	2006 KK_{18}	—	May 21, 2006	Kitt Peak	Spacewatch	·	2.4 km	MPC · JPL
282783	2006 KM_{26}	—	May 20, 2006	Kitt Peak	Spacewatch	fast	2.7 km	MPC · JPL
282784	2006 KP_{37}	—	May 22, 2006	Kitt Peak	Spacewatch	·	4.7 km	MPC · JPL
282785	2006 KC_{53}	—	May 21, 2006	Kitt Peak	Spacewatch	·	2.9 km	MPC · JPL
282786	2006 KD_{55}	—	February 1, 2005	Kitt Peak	Spacewatch	·	5.5 km	MPC · JPL
282787	2006 KL_{82}	—	May 25, 2006	Mount Lemmon	Mount Lemmon Survey	·	2.6 km	MPC · JPL
282788	2006 KX_{102}	—	May 29, 2006	Kitt Peak	Spacewatch	·	2.1 km	MPC · JPL
282789	2006 KO_{114}	—	May 25, 2006	Socorro	LINEAR	H	770 m	MPC · JPL
282790	2006 ME_{12}	—	June 20, 2006	Hibiscus	S. F. Hönig	·	1.2 km	MPC · JPL
282791	2006 NA	—	July 1, 2006	Eskridge	Farpoint	·	4.2 km	MPC · JPL
282792	2006 OM_{4}	—	July 21, 2006	Catalina	CSS	·	3.8 km	MPC · JPL
282793	2006 OV_{13}	—	July 25, 2006	Palomar	NEAT	·	2.4 km	MPC · JPL
282794	2006 OF_{14}	—	July 27, 2006	Hibiscus	S. F. Hönig	·	3.7 km	MPC · JPL
282795	2006 PR_{17}	—	August 15, 2006	Palomar	NEAT	·	1.9 km	MPC · JPL
282796	2006 PA_{19}	—	August 13, 2006	Palomar	NEAT	·	4.1 km	MPC · JPL
282797	2006 PO_{43}	—	August 12, 2006	Palomar	NEAT	H	790 m	MPC · JPL
282798	2006 QR_{60}	—	August 20, 2006	Palomar	NEAT	·	4.4 km	MPC · JPL
282799	2006 QS_{62}	—	August 23, 2006	Socorro	LINEAR	·	3.3 km	MPC · JPL
282800	2006 QK_{64}	—	August 19, 2006	Anderson Mesa	LONEOS	·	1.6 km	MPC · JPL

== 282801–282900 ==
back to top

Designation			Discovery			Properties		Ref
Permanent	Provisional	Named after	Date	Site	Discoverer(s)	Category	Diam.	Ref
282801	2006 QN_{91}	—	August 16, 2006	Palomar	NEAT	·	3.8 km	MPC · JPL
282802	2006 QG_{92}	—	August 16, 2006	Palomar	NEAT	·	970 m	MPC · JPL
282803	2006 QD_{100}	—	August 24, 2006	Socorro	LINEAR	·	4.4 km	MPC · JPL
282804	2006 QC_{116}	—	August 27, 2006	Anderson Mesa	LONEOS	·	4.2 km	MPC · JPL
282805	2006 QU_{136}	—	August 16, 2006	Palomar	NEAT	·	3.0 km	MPC · JPL
282806	2006 QN_{141}	—	August 18, 2006	Palomar	NEAT	EOS	2.7 km	MPC · JPL
282807	2006 QG_{147}	—	August 18, 2006	Kitt Peak	Spacewatch	·	2.6 km	MPC · JPL
282808	2006 QP_{184}	—	August 19, 2006	Kitt Peak	Spacewatch	EOS	2.4 km	MPC · JPL
282809	2006 RB_{3}	—	September 14, 2006	Catalina	CSS	URS	6.2 km	MPC · JPL
282810	2006 RC_{5}	—	September 14, 2006	Catalina	CSS	EOS	3.3 km	MPC · JPL
282811	2006 RZ_{9}	—	September 13, 2006	Palomar	NEAT	(16286)	3.0 km	MPC · JPL
282812	2006 RQ_{18}	—	September 14, 2006	Catalina	CSS	·	3.3 km	MPC · JPL
282813	2006 RJ_{20}	—	September 15, 2006	Socorro	LINEAR	·	3.6 km	MPC · JPL
282814	2006 RQ_{38}	—	September 14, 2006	Catalina	CSS	·	4.2 km	MPC · JPL
282815	2006 RN_{60}	—	September 13, 2006	Palomar	NEAT	EOS	2.1 km	MPC · JPL
282816	2006 RL_{80}	—	September 15, 2006	Kitt Peak	Spacewatch	·	3.2 km	MPC · JPL
282817	2006 RT_{90}	—	September 15, 2006	Kitt Peak	Spacewatch	LIX	3.4 km	MPC · JPL
282818	2006 SD_{43}	—	September 18, 2006	Kitt Peak	Spacewatch	(194)	1.8 km	MPC · JPL
282819	2006 SR_{44}	—	September 17, 2006	Anderson Mesa	LONEOS	·	4.7 km	MPC · JPL
282820	2006 SH_{59}	—	September 16, 2006	Catalina	CSS	·	5.7 km	MPC · JPL
282821	2006 SP_{111}	—	September 22, 2006	Anderson Mesa	LONEOS	H	820 m	MPC · JPL
282822	2006 SA_{118}	—	September 24, 2006	Kitt Peak	Spacewatch	·	990 m	MPC · JPL
282823	2006 SL_{214}	—	September 27, 2006	Mount Lemmon	Mount Lemmon Survey	·	2.0 km	MPC · JPL
282824	2006 SY_{219}	—	September 25, 2006	Anderson Mesa	LONEOS	·	4.2 km	MPC · JPL
282825	2006 SS_{249}	—	September 26, 2006	Kitt Peak	Spacewatch	·	3.6 km	MPC · JPL
282826	2006 SL_{306}	—	September 27, 2006	Mount Lemmon	Mount Lemmon Survey	KON	3.2 km	MPC · JPL
282827	2006 SD_{349}	—	September 28, 2006	Catalina	CSS	·	3.9 km	MPC · JPL
282828	2006 SL_{405}	—	September 17, 2006	Kitt Peak	Spacewatch	THM	3.1 km	MPC · JPL
282829	2006 TP_{45}	—	October 12, 2006	Kitt Peak	Spacewatch	KON	2.1 km	MPC · JPL
282830	2006 TU_{67}	—	October 11, 2006	Palomar	NEAT	·	4.4 km	MPC · JPL
282831	2006 TZ_{70}	—	October 11, 2006	Palomar	NEAT	·	1.1 km	MPC · JPL
282832	2006 TN_{77}	—	October 12, 2006	Palomar	NEAT	·	3.6 km	MPC · JPL
282833	2006 TK_{95}	—	October 3, 2006	Siding Spring	SSS	EUP	4.8 km	MPC · JPL
282834	2006 UZ_{2}	—	October 16, 2006	Catalina	CSS	·	6.1 km	MPC · JPL
282835	2006 UG_{8}	—	October 16, 2006	Catalina	CSS	HYG	3.1 km	MPC · JPL
282836	2006 UJ_{28}	—	October 16, 2006	Kitt Peak	Spacewatch	·	1.6 km	MPC · JPL
282837	2006 UO_{47}	—	October 17, 2006	Kitt Peak	Spacewatch	·	4.3 km	MPC · JPL
282838	2006 UU_{76}	—	October 17, 2006	Kitt Peak	Spacewatch	·	5.4 km	MPC · JPL
282839	2006 UH_{124}	—	October 19, 2006	Catalina	CSS	·	4.2 km	MPC · JPL
282840	2006 US_{139}	—	October 19, 2006	Mount Lemmon	Mount Lemmon Survey	(5)	1.5 km	MPC · JPL
282841	2006 UW_{146}	—	October 20, 2006	Kitt Peak	Spacewatch	EOS	1.9 km	MPC · JPL
282842	2006 UM_{184}	—	October 19, 2006	Catalina	CSS	RAF	1.4 km	MPC · JPL
282843	2006 UX_{186}	—	October 19, 2006	Catalina	CSS	·	5.1 km	MPC · JPL
282844	2006 UP_{203}	—	October 22, 2006	Palomar	NEAT	PHO	3.0 km	MPC · JPL
282845	2006 UZ_{291}	—	October 28, 2006	Apache Point	SDSS	EOS	2.6 km	MPC · JPL
282846	2006 VQ_{12}	—	November 11, 2006	Socorro	LINEAR	H	1.4 km	MPC · JPL
282847	2006 VJ_{30}	—	November 10, 2006	Kitt Peak	Spacewatch	·	1.7 km	MPC · JPL
282848	2006 VL_{34}	—	November 11, 2006	Catalina	CSS	·	3.4 km	MPC · JPL
282849	2006 VV_{56}	—	November 11, 2006	Kitt Peak	Spacewatch	·	2.6 km	MPC · JPL
282850	2006 WX_{100}	—	November 19, 2006	Socorro	LINEAR	·	4.5 km	MPC · JPL
282851	2006 XE_{6}	—	December 8, 2006	Anderson Mesa	LONEOS	H	990 m	MPC · JPL
282852	2006 XK_{69}	—	December 12, 2006	Mount Lemmon	Mount Lemmon Survey	V	880 m	MPC · JPL
282853	2007 AL_{30}	—	January 10, 2007	Mount Lemmon	Mount Lemmon Survey	·	1.3 km	MPC · JPL
282854	2007 BZ_{12}	—	January 17, 2007	Kitt Peak	Spacewatch	·	790 m	MPC · JPL
282855	2007 BP_{21}	—	January 24, 2007	Socorro	LINEAR	·	1.4 km	MPC · JPL
282856	2007 BA_{42}	—	January 24, 2007	Catalina	CSS	·	2.1 km	MPC · JPL
282857	2007 BN_{47}	—	January 26, 2007	Kitt Peak	Spacewatch	·	890 m	MPC · JPL
282858	2007 CX_{12}	—	January 26, 2007	Kitt Peak	Spacewatch	·	1.2 km	MPC · JPL
282859	2007 CU_{23}	—	February 7, 2007	Palomar	NEAT	·	1.5 km	MPC · JPL
282860	2007 CM_{27}	—	February 5, 2007	Lulin	Lin, H.-C., Q. Ye	·	1.8 km	MPC · JPL
282861	2007 DQ_{25}	—	February 17, 2007	Kitt Peak	Spacewatch	·	2.3 km	MPC · JPL
282862	2007 DE_{31}	—	February 17, 2007	Kitt Peak	Spacewatch	·	740 m	MPC · JPL
282863	2007 DF_{33}	—	February 17, 2007	Kitt Peak	Spacewatch	·	820 m	MPC · JPL
282864	2007 DQ_{49}	—	February 16, 2007	Catalina	CSS	·	1.1 km	MPC · JPL
282865	2007 DB_{97}	—	February 23, 2007	Kitt Peak	Spacewatch	·	1.3 km	MPC · JPL
282866	2007 DC_{110}	—	February 27, 2007	Kitt Peak	Spacewatch	HYG	4.7 km	MPC · JPL
282867	2007 DZ_{116}	—	February 19, 2007	Catalina	CSS	·	3.4 km	MPC · JPL
282868	2007 EQ_{1}	—	March 9, 2007	Kitt Peak	Spacewatch	JUN	1.4 km	MPC · JPL
282869	2007 EV_{17}	—	March 9, 2007	Mount Lemmon	Mount Lemmon Survey	·	1.1 km	MPC · JPL
282870	2007 EV_{30}	—	March 10, 2007	Kitt Peak	Spacewatch	·	990 m	MPC · JPL
282871	2007 EO_{47}	—	March 9, 2007	Mount Lemmon	Mount Lemmon Survey	V	620 m	MPC · JPL
282872	2007 EV_{55}	—	March 12, 2007	Mount Lemmon	Mount Lemmon Survey	·	910 m	MPC · JPL
282873	2007 ET_{65}	—	March 10, 2007	Kitt Peak	Spacewatch	·	1 km	MPC · JPL
282874	2007 EH_{68}	—	March 10, 2007	Kitt Peak	Spacewatch	·	970 m	MPC · JPL
282875	2007 EH_{90}	—	March 9, 2007	Catalina	CSS	·	1.6 km	MPC · JPL
282876	2007 EU_{101}	—	March 11, 2007	Kitt Peak	Spacewatch	·	1.7 km	MPC · JPL
282877	2007 ER_{104}	—	February 26, 2007	Mount Lemmon	Mount Lemmon Survey	NEM	2.3 km	MPC · JPL
282878	2007 EO_{110}	—	March 11, 2007	Kitt Peak	Spacewatch	NYS	1.4 km	MPC · JPL
282879	2007 EV_{132}	—	March 9, 2007	Mount Lemmon	Mount Lemmon Survey	NYS	1.0 km	MPC · JPL
282880	2007 EA_{157}	—	March 12, 2007	Kitt Peak	Spacewatch	·	1.3 km	MPC · JPL
282881	2007 EN_{158}	—	March 14, 2007	Mount Lemmon	Mount Lemmon Survey	·	990 m	MPC · JPL
282882	2007 EA_{159}	—	March 14, 2007	Mount Lemmon	Mount Lemmon Survey	·	640 m	MPC · JPL
282883	2007 EQ_{160}	—	March 14, 2007	Catalina	CSS	·	1.5 km	MPC · JPL
282884	2007 ED_{167}	—	March 11, 2007	Mount Lemmon	Mount Lemmon Survey	NYS	1.4 km	MPC · JPL
282885	2007 ES_{169}	—	March 13, 2007	Kitt Peak	Spacewatch	·	1.2 km	MPC · JPL
282886	2007 ER_{175}	—	March 14, 2007	Kitt Peak	Spacewatch	·	1.3 km	MPC · JPL
282887	2007 EE_{191}	—	March 13, 2007	Kitt Peak	Spacewatch	·	1.1 km	MPC · JPL
282888	2007 EO_{210}	—	March 8, 2007	Palomar	NEAT	·	870 m	MPC · JPL
282889	2007 FP_{25}	—	March 20, 2007	Kitt Peak	Spacewatch	MAS	810 m	MPC · JPL
282890	2007 FZ_{30}	—	March 20, 2007	Mount Lemmon	Mount Lemmon Survey	·	1.3 km	MPC · JPL
282891	2007 GE_{8}	—	April 7, 2007	Mount Lemmon	Mount Lemmon Survey	·	810 m	MPC · JPL
282892	2007 GB_{11}	—	April 11, 2007	Kitt Peak	Spacewatch	·	840 m	MPC · JPL
282893	2007 GQ_{18}	—	April 11, 2007	Kitt Peak	Spacewatch	·	1.4 km	MPC · JPL
282894	2007 GH_{21}	—	April 11, 2007	Mount Lemmon	Mount Lemmon Survey	NYS	1.3 km	MPC · JPL
282895	2007 GZ_{24}	—	April 12, 2007	Črni Vrh	Mikuž, H.	·	2.9 km	MPC · JPL
282896	2007 GW_{25}	—	April 14, 2007	Kitt Peak	Spacewatch	·	1.2 km	MPC · JPL
282897 Kaltenbrunner	2007 GK_{28}	Kaltenbrunner	April 15, 2007	Altschwendt	W. Ries	·	1.3 km	MPC · JPL
282898	2007 GQ_{30}	—	April 14, 2007	Mount Lemmon	Mount Lemmon Survey	V	900 m	MPC · JPL
282899	2007 GW_{35}	—	April 14, 2007	Kitt Peak	Spacewatch	·	1.8 km	MPC · JPL
282900	2007 GG_{50}	—	April 15, 2007	Socorro	LINEAR	·	3.7 km	MPC · JPL

== 282901–283000 ==
back to top

Designation			Discovery			Properties		Ref
Permanent	Provisional	Named after	Date	Site	Discoverer(s)	Category	Diam.	Ref
282901	2007 GV_{50}	—	April 15, 2007	Catalina	CSS	·	3.0 km	MPC · JPL
282902	2007 HN_{11}	—	April 18, 2007	Mount Lemmon	Mount Lemmon Survey	MAS	860 m	MPC · JPL
282903 Masada	2007 HX_{14}	Masada	April 20, 2007	Vallemare Borbona	V. S. Casulli	·	1.0 km	MPC · JPL
282904	2007 HV_{27}	—	April 18, 2007	Kitt Peak	Spacewatch	·	1.5 km	MPC · JPL
282905	2007 HP_{47}	—	April 20, 2007	Kitt Peak	Spacewatch	·	1.4 km	MPC · JPL
282906	2007 HV_{54}	—	April 22, 2007	Kitt Peak	Spacewatch	·	1.7 km	MPC · JPL
282907	2007 HA_{66}	—	April 22, 2007	Catalina	CSS	·	1.8 km	MPC · JPL
282908	2007 HE_{81}	—	April 25, 2007	Mount Lemmon	Mount Lemmon Survey	·	1.7 km	MPC · JPL
282909	2007 HQ_{88}	—	April 22, 2007	Catalina	CSS	·	1.7 km	MPC · JPL
282910	2007 HY_{95}	—	April 25, 2007	Kitt Peak	Spacewatch	V	1.0 km	MPC · JPL
282911	2007 HD_{97}	—	April 16, 2007	Catalina	CSS	·	2.5 km	MPC · JPL
282912	2007 JR_{3}	—	May 6, 2007	Kitt Peak	Spacewatch	V	820 m	MPC · JPL
282913	2007 JE_{43}	—	May 13, 2007	Siding Spring	SSS	·	3.0 km	MPC · JPL
282914	2007 LR_{14}	—	June 10, 2007	Kitt Peak	Spacewatch	·	1.4 km	MPC · JPL
282915	2007 LF_{19}	—	June 11, 2007	Siding Spring	SSS	·	2.3 km	MPC · JPL
282916	2007 LH_{24}	—	June 14, 2007	Kitt Peak	Spacewatch	NYS	1.3 km	MPC · JPL
282917	2007 LA_{33}	—	June 15, 2007	Catalina	CSS	·	1.9 km	MPC · JPL
282918	2007 NA_{3}	—	July 14, 2007	Tiki	S. F. Hönig, Teamo, N.	·	3.7 km	MPC · JPL
282919	2007 NW_{6}	—	July 15, 2007	Siding Spring	SSS	·	2.7 km	MPC · JPL
282920	2007 OS_{5}	—	July 22, 2007	Lulin	LUSS	V	1.1 km	MPC · JPL
282921	2007 OA_{6}	—	July 22, 2007	Lulin	LUSS	·	1.7 km	MPC · JPL
282922	2007 PL_{3}	—	August 6, 2007	Lulin	LUSS	·	3.0 km	MPC · JPL
282923	2007 PO_{3}	—	August 6, 2007	Lulin	LUSS	·	3.0 km	MPC · JPL
282924	2007 PP_{11}	—	August 11, 2007	Socorro	LINEAR	·	1.6 km	MPC · JPL
282925	2007 PF_{16}	—	August 8, 2007	Socorro	LINEAR	·	2.5 km	MPC · JPL
282926	2007 PN_{18}	—	August 9, 2007	Socorro	LINEAR	·	1.7 km	MPC · JPL
282927	2007 PB_{24}	—	August 12, 2007	Socorro	LINEAR	·	1.9 km	MPC · JPL
282928	2007 PD_{24}	—	August 12, 2007	Socorro	LINEAR	(18466)	4.2 km	MPC · JPL
282929	2007 PH_{29}	—	August 6, 2007	Socorro	LINEAR	JUN	1.8 km	MPC · JPL
282930	2007 PM_{30}	—	August 11, 2007	Socorro	LINEAR	GEF	1.8 km	MPC · JPL
282931	2007 PC_{31}	—	August 5, 2007	Socorro	LINEAR	·	2.2 km	MPC · JPL
282932	2007 PU_{34}	—	August 9, 2007	Socorro	LINEAR	·	2.1 km	MPC · JPL
282933	2007 PP_{40}	—	August 6, 2007	Črni Vrh	Matičič, S.	·	3.8 km	MPC · JPL
282934	2007 PX_{44}	—	August 12, 2007	Siding Spring	SSS	BAR	2.0 km	MPC · JPL
282935	2007 PK_{49}	—	August 9, 2007	Socorro	LINEAR	·	1.4 km	MPC · JPL
282936	2007 QA_{10}	—	August 22, 2007	Socorro	LINEAR	TEL	2.2 km	MPC · JPL
282937	2007 QV_{11}	—	August 23, 2007	Kitt Peak	Spacewatch	·	4.4 km	MPC · JPL
282938	2007 RQ_{11}	—	September 10, 2007	Dauban	Chante-Perdrix	·	2.5 km	MPC · JPL
282939	2007 RG_{13}	—	September 3, 2007	Catalina	CSS	EUN	1.5 km	MPC · JPL
282940	2007 RD_{18}	—	September 12, 2007	Dauban	Chante-Perdrix	·	2.6 km	MPC · JPL
282941	2007 RO_{24}	—	September 4, 2007	Mount Lemmon	Mount Lemmon Survey	HNS	2.2 km	MPC · JPL
282942	2007 RQ_{37}	—	September 8, 2007	Anderson Mesa	LONEOS	·	5.2 km	MPC · JPL
282943	2007 RU_{39}	—	September 9, 2007	Kitt Peak	Spacewatch	·	1.5 km	MPC · JPL
282944	2007 RQ_{42}	—	September 9, 2007	Kitt Peak	Spacewatch	·	2.8 km	MPC · JPL
282945	2007 RS_{45}	—	September 9, 2007	Kitt Peak	Spacewatch	·	1.8 km	MPC · JPL
282946	2007 RA_{75}	—	September 10, 2007	Mount Lemmon	Mount Lemmon Survey	THM	2.6 km	MPC · JPL
282947	2007 RG_{99}	—	September 11, 2007	Kitt Peak	Spacewatch	·	2.1 km	MPC · JPL
282948	2007 RY_{101}	—	September 11, 2007	Catalina	CSS	DOR	4.5 km	MPC · JPL
282949	2007 RQ_{112}	—	September 11, 2007	Kitt Peak	Spacewatch	·	3.7 km	MPC · JPL
282950	2007 RZ_{125}	—	September 12, 2007	Catalina	CSS	·	2.6 km	MPC · JPL
282951	2007 RN_{144}	—	September 14, 2007	Socorro	LINEAR	·	2.4 km	MPC · JPL
282952	2007 RV_{187}	—	September 13, 2007	La Sagra	OAM	·	2.3 km	MPC · JPL
282953	2007 RN_{200}	—	September 13, 2007	Kitt Peak	Spacewatch	·	2.1 km	MPC · JPL
282954	2007 RX_{201}	—	September 13, 2007	Kitt Peak	Spacewatch	·	2.4 km	MPC · JPL
282955	2007 RE_{222}	—	September 14, 2007	Mount Lemmon	Mount Lemmon Survey	·	2.6 km	MPC · JPL
282956	2007 RY_{236}	—	September 13, 2007	Catalina	CSS	·	2.8 km	MPC · JPL
282957	2007 RG_{241}	—	September 10, 2007	Catalina	CSS	·	3.8 km	MPC · JPL
282958	2007 RM_{253}	—	September 14, 2007	Kitt Peak	Spacewatch	·	1.4 km	MPC · JPL
282959	2007 RR_{257}	—	September 14, 2007	Kitt Peak	Spacewatch	·	1.4 km	MPC · JPL
282960	2007 RZ_{260}	—	September 14, 2007	Kitt Peak	Spacewatch	EOS	2.5 km	MPC · JPL
282961	2007 RU_{263}	—	September 15, 2007	Anderson Mesa	LONEOS	NYS	1.5 km	MPC · JPL
282962	2007 RV_{273}	—	September 15, 2007	Kitt Peak	Spacewatch	WIT	1.1 km	MPC · JPL
282963	2007 RO_{277}	—	September 5, 2007	Catalina	CSS	fast	3.1 km	MPC · JPL
282964	2007 RN_{281}	—	September 14, 2007	Anderson Mesa	LONEOS	HNS	2.2 km	MPC · JPL
282965	2007 RB_{287}	—	September 5, 2007	Catalina	CSS	·	2.1 km	MPC · JPL
282966	2007 RA_{310}	—	September 3, 2007	Catalina	CSS	·	3.5 km	MPC · JPL
282967	2007 RK_{311}	—	July 18, 2007	Mount Lemmon	Mount Lemmon Survey	·	2.6 km	MPC · JPL
282968	2007 SS	—	September 18, 2007	Hibiscus	S. F. Hönig, Teamo, N.	·	2.9 km	MPC · JPL
282969	2007 SP_{4}	—	September 20, 2007	Farra d'Isonzo	Farra d'Isonzo	TIR	4.0 km	MPC · JPL
282970	2007 SA_{9}	—	September 18, 2007	Kitt Peak	Spacewatch	·	4.4 km	MPC · JPL
282971	2007 SP_{23}	—	September 22, 2007	Socorro	LINEAR	·	1.8 km	MPC · JPL
282972	2007 TE_{4}	—	October 6, 2007	La Sagra	OAM	·	3.0 km	MPC · JPL
282973	2007 TJ_{11}	—	October 6, 2007	Socorro	LINEAR	·	1.6 km	MPC · JPL
282974	2007 TQ_{14}	—	October 7, 2007	La Sagra	OAM	·	2.8 km	MPC · JPL
282975	2007 TS_{14}	—	October 8, 2007	La Sagra	OAM	·	4.5 km	MPC · JPL
282976	2007 TP_{27}	—	October 4, 2007	Kitt Peak	Spacewatch	·	2.6 km	MPC · JPL
282977	2007 TW_{39}	—	October 6, 2007	Kitt Peak	Spacewatch	·	3.4 km	MPC · JPL
282978	2007 TA_{41}	—	October 6, 2007	Kitt Peak	Spacewatch	·	2.2 km	MPC · JPL
282979	2007 TV_{41}	—	October 6, 2007	Purple Mountain	PMO NEO Survey Program	RAF	1.3 km	MPC · JPL
282980	2007 TQ_{55}	—	October 4, 2007	Kitt Peak	Spacewatch	KOR	1.7 km	MPC · JPL
282981	2007 TL_{66}	—	October 9, 2007	Tiki	Teamo, N., Pelle, J. C.	·	3.4 km	MPC · JPL
282982	2007 TM_{80}	—	October 7, 2007	Catalina	CSS	·	2.8 km	MPC · JPL
282983	2007 TL_{94}	—	October 7, 2007	Catalina	CSS	EUN	1.8 km	MPC · JPL
282984	2007 TU_{109}	—	October 7, 2007	Catalina	CSS	·	2.0 km	MPC · JPL
282985	2007 TO_{122}	—	October 6, 2007	Kitt Peak	Spacewatch	·	2.6 km	MPC · JPL
282986	2007 TA_{136}	—	October 8, 2007	Catalina	CSS	·	4.0 km	MPC · JPL
282987	2007 TK_{155}	—	October 9, 2007	Socorro	LINEAR	(5)	1.5 km	MPC · JPL
282988	2007 TD_{156}	—	October 9, 2007	Socorro	LINEAR	·	3.9 km	MPC · JPL
282989	2007 TP_{184}	—	October 13, 2007	Skylive	Tozzi, F.	·	2.1 km	MPC · JPL
282990	2007 TJ_{222}	—	October 9, 2007	Kitt Peak	Spacewatch	·	3.1 km	MPC · JPL
282991	2007 TC_{245}	—	October 8, 2007	Catalina	CSS	EUN	1.9 km	MPC · JPL
282992	2007 TL_{246}	—	October 9, 2007	Anderson Mesa	LONEOS	·	2.1 km	MPC · JPL
282993	2007 TN_{246}	—	October 9, 2007	Catalina	CSS	·	2.0 km	MPC · JPL
282994	2007 TJ_{248}	—	October 10, 2007	Anderson Mesa	LONEOS	·	2.1 km	MPC · JPL
282995	2007 TF_{282}	—	October 8, 2007	Mount Lemmon	Mount Lemmon Survey	KOR	1.7 km	MPC · JPL
282996	2007 TP_{283}	—	October 8, 2007	Mount Lemmon	Mount Lemmon Survey	·	2.3 km	MPC · JPL
282997	2007 TR_{316}	—	October 12, 2007	Kitt Peak	Spacewatch	·	3.1 km	MPC · JPL
282998	2007 TV_{370}	—	October 12, 2007	Anderson Mesa	LONEOS	·	4.4 km	MPC · JPL
282999	2007 TM_{373}	—	October 14, 2007	Kitt Peak	Spacewatch	THM	2.8 km	MPC · JPL
283000	2007 TE_{386}	—	October 15, 2007	Catalina	CSS	EOS	2.8 km	MPC · JPL

back to top

== See also ==
- Meanings of minor-planet names: 282001–283000
