= Meanings of minor-planet names: 282001–283000 =

As minor planet discoveries are confirmed, they are given a permanent number by the IAU's Minor Planet Center (MPC), and the discoverers can then submit names for them, following the IAU's naming conventions. The list below concerns those minor planets in the specified number-range that have received names, and explains the meanings of those names.

Official naming citations of newly named small Solar System bodies are approved and published in a bulletin by IAU's Working Group for Small Bodies Nomenclature (WGSBN). Before May 2021, citations were published in MPC's Minor Planet Circulars for many decades. Recent citations can also be found on the JPL Small-Body Database (SBDB). Until his death in 2016, German astronomer Lutz D. Schmadel compiled these citations into the Dictionary of Minor Planet Names (DMP) and regularly updated the collection.

Based on Paul Herget's The Names of the Minor Planets, Schmadel also researched the unclear origin of numerous asteroids, most of which had been named prior to World War II. This article incorporates text from this source, which is in the public domain: SBDB New namings may only be added to this list below after official publication as the preannouncement of names is condemned. The WGSBN publishes a comprehensive guideline for the naming rules of non-cometary small Solar System bodies.

== 282001–282100 ==
Named minor planet	Provisional	This minor planet was named for...	Ref · Catalog
282034 Torinodisangro	1995 UO	Torino di Sangro, a small village in Abruzzo, central Italy.	IAU · 282034

== 282101–282200 ==
back to top

Named minor planet	Provisional	This minor planet was named for...	Ref · Catalog
There are no named minor planets in this number range

== 282201–282300 ==
back to top

Named minor planet	Provisional	This minor planet was named for...	Ref · Catalog
There are no named minor planets in this number range

== 282301–282400 ==
back to top

Named minor planet	Provisional	This minor planet was named for...	Ref · Catalog
There are no named minor planets in this number range

== 282401–282500 ==
back to top

Named minor planet	Provisional	This minor planet was named for...	Ref · Catalog
There are no named minor planets in this number range

== 282501–282600 ==
back to top

Named minor planet	Provisional	This minor planet was named for...	Ref · Catalog
There are no named minor planets in this number range

== 282601–282700 ==
back to top

Named minor planet	Provisional	This minor planet was named for...	Ref · Catalog
282630 Caroljones	2005 RL_{50}	Carol Evelyn Jones née Millar (b. 1958), a Canadian astronomer.	IAU · 282630
282669 Erguël	2005 VD_{4}	Erguël, an ancient seigniory of the Catholic diocese of Basel, Switzerland	JPL · 282669

== 282701–282800 ==
back to top

Named minor planet	Provisional	This minor planet was named for...	Ref · Catalog
There are no named minor planets in this number range

== 282801–282900 ==
back to top

Named minor planet	Provisional	This minor planet was named for...	Ref · Catalog
282897 Kaltenbrunner	2007 GK_{28}	Gerlinde Kaltenbrunner (born 1970), an Austrian mountaineer	JPL · 282897

== 282901–283000 ==
back to top

Named minor planet	Provisional	This minor planet was named for...	Ref · Catalog
282903 Masada	2007 HX_{14}	Masada is an ancient fortification located on a plateau on the eastern edge of the Judaean desert. Herod the Great built palaces there. Masada is one of Israel's most popular tourist attractions and is a UNESCO World Heritage Site.	JPL · 282903

back to top

Preceded by 281,001–282,000	Meanings of minor-planet names List of minor planets: 282,001–283,000	Succeeded by 283,001–284,000
