= Péry-La Heutte =

- Municipality
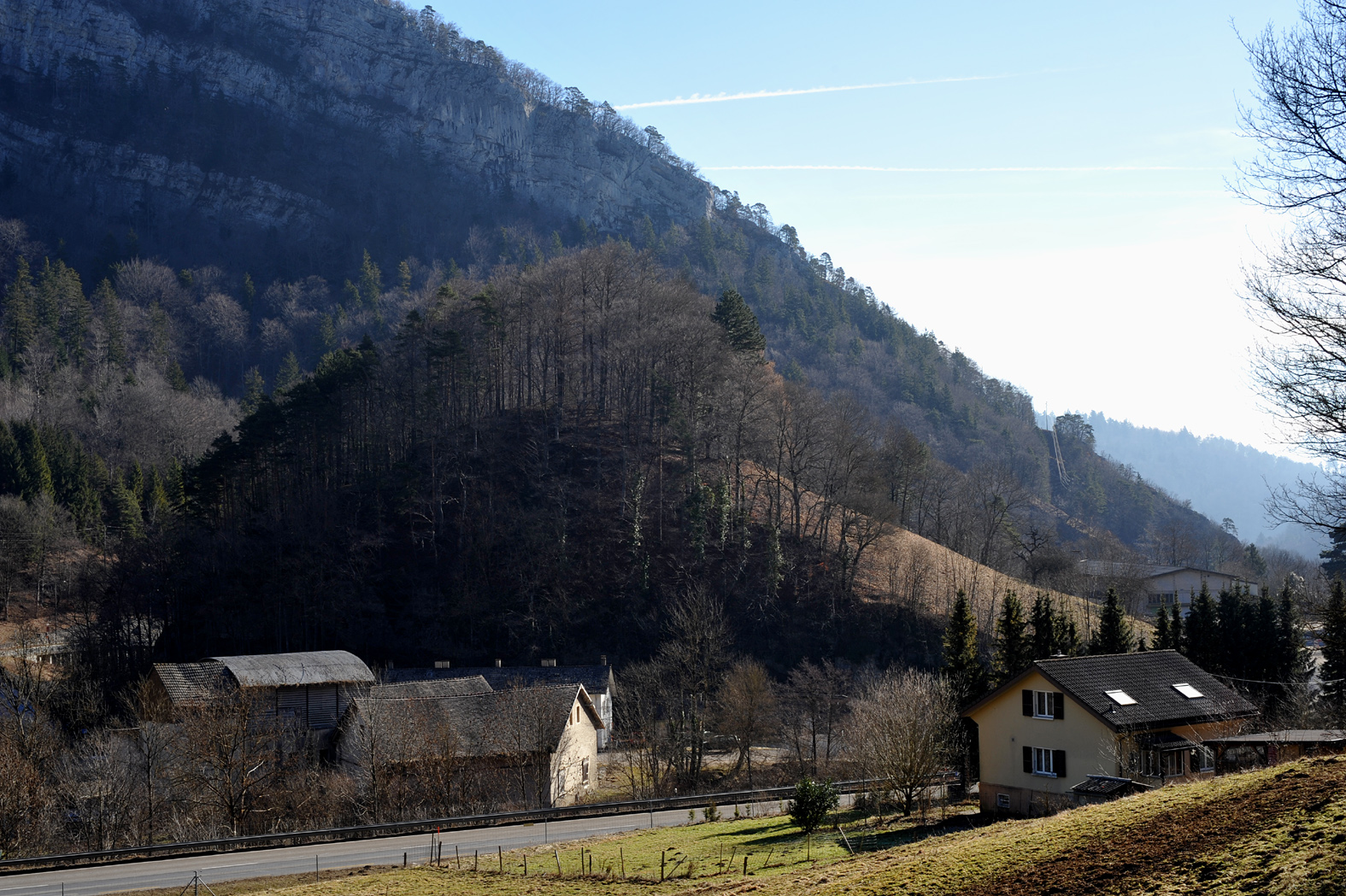
- Rondchâtel village in Péry municipality

- Flag Coat of arms
- Location of Péry-La Heutte
- Location within Switzerland Location within Canton of Bern
- Coordinates: 47°12′N 7°15′E
- Country: Switzerland
- Canton: Bern
- District: Jura bernois

Government
  - Mayor: Claude Nussbaumer SVP/UDC (as of 2026)

Area
  - Total: 23.79 km^{2} (9.19 sq mi)
- Elevation: 635 m (2,083 ft)

Population (Dec 2013)
  - Total: 1,844
  - Density: 77.51/km^{2} (200.8/sq mi)
- Time zone: UTC+01:00 (CET)
  - Summer (DST): UTC+02:00 (CEST)
- Postal code: 2603/2604
- SFOS number: 450
- ISO 3166 code: CH-BE
- Surrounded by: Orvin, Vauffelin, Plagne, Romont, Sorvilier, Bévilard, Malleray, Reconvilier
- Website: https://www.pery-laheutte.ch SFSO statistics

Péry-La Heutte is a municipality in the Jura bernois administrative district in the canton of Bern in Switzerland. It is located in the French-speaking Bernese Jura (Jura Bernois). On 1 January 2015, the former municipalities of Péry and La Heutte merged to form the new municipality of Péry-La Heutte.

== History ==
Aerial view of Péry (1950)

=== Péry ===
The first mention of Péry is in 884 where it is called villam Bedericam. In 1148, it was known as Peril, though that name comes from a 12th-century forgery. The municipality was formerly known by its German name Büderich, however, that name is no longer used.

In 884, Charles the Fat granted Péry to Moutier-Grandval Abbey. The Abbey owned the village and surrounding lands until 999 when the Prince-Bishop of Basel acquired the village. He incorporated it into the seigniory of Erguel and gave the village to the Lords of Péry who ruled from Châtillon Castle, now a ruin, on a nearby hill. Beginning in the 14th century the feudal levies from Péry were part of the Erguel army under the command of Biel. In 1530, Biel encouraged the village to accept the Protestant Reformation.

The village of Rondchâtel was independent of Péry until 1766. Based on the name, it is likely that a castle existed on the hill, but little is known about it. During the mid 14th century, the Prince-Bishop of Basel Johann II von Munsingen, granted Rondchâtel to his brother Conrad, who was an ecclesiastical bailiff of Biel in 1340-65. Starting at the end of the 14th century, Rondchâtel fief was owned by the de Nans and d'Orsans families out of Franche-Comté. They held the village until 1766, when the last heir of the families died out and the fief reverted to the Prince-Bishop. The Prince-Bishop then leased Rondchâtel to the community of Péry.

After the 1797 French victory and the Treaty of Campo Formio, Péry became part of the French Département of Mont-Terrible. A few years later, it became part of the Département of Haut-Rhin. After Napoleon's defeat and the Congress of Vienna, Péry was assigned to the Canton of Bern in 1815.

The village church of St. James was first mentioned in 884. After the village converted to the new Reformed faith in 1530, it became a Reformed church. The current church was built in 1706 around a core of an older, Gothic building. At some point it became the parish church for the parish of Péry. From 1798 until 1840, Vauffelin was part of the parish. A Roman Catholic chapel was built in the village in 1906.

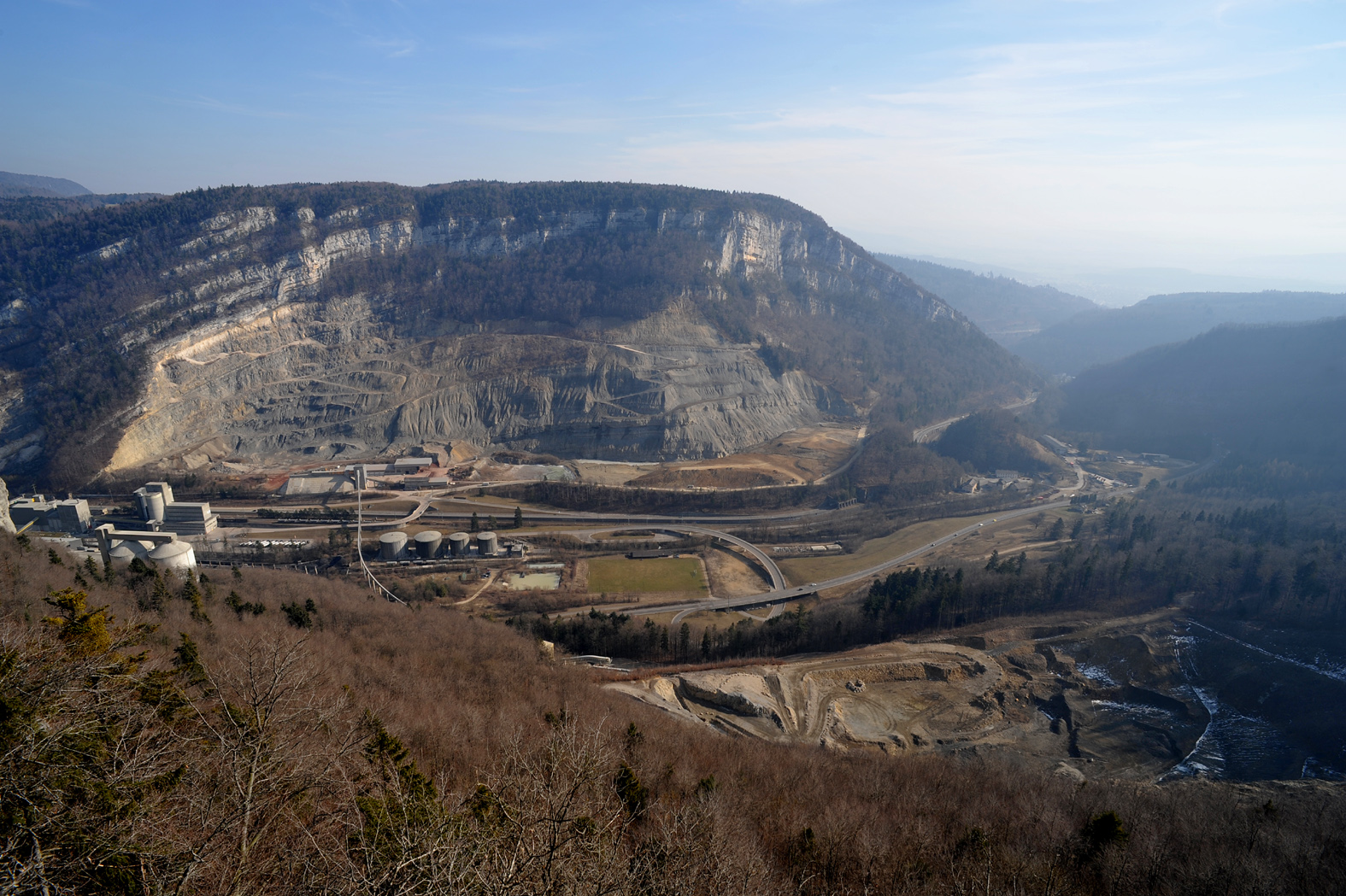
Rondchâtel cement factory and quarry

The Prince-Bishop of Basel, Johann Franz von Schönau-Zell (Bishop 1651-1656), had a blast furnace built at La Reuchenette in 1654. In 1693 he gave the furnace as a fief to Chemilleret family, who held it until the death of their last heir in 1756. By 1782 the site included an ironworks, a house, an inn. After the French invasion, it was declared a national treasure and the feudal ownership was abolished. The Société des forges d'Undervelier took over operation of the site until 1867, when it closed.

The Biel-Les Convers railway opened in 1874 and encouraged industrial and population growth. The lime and cement factory in Rondchâtel (1874), the wood pulp plant at Biberist (1882) and a branch of the Rondchâtel cement factory in La Reuchenette (today Ciments Vigier SA) all contributed to the prosperity of the municipality. The watch manufacturer Dreyfus Frères SA of Biel opened a branch company in 1903 in Péry. This company, called Péry Watch, did not survive the financial crisis of the 1930s. The building was converted in 1934 into a typewriter ribbon, stencils and carbon paper factory under the name Carfa SA. Carfa remained in operation until 2003. In 2005, just over half of all jobs in the municipality were in manufacturing.

=== La Heutte ===
La Heutte was first mentioned in 1393 as Hütte. It was first called by the current name in 1727.

A glass-hut or glassworks was mentioned in the area as part of a fief of the d'Orsans family in 1370. While a village was not mentioned then, by 1393 a village had grown around the glassworks. It was part of the seigniory of Erguel in the Diocese of Basel. It was part of the parish of Péry. So La Heutte adopted the Protestant Reformation in 1530, when Biel converted the entire parish of Péry to the new faith. During the 18th century, Biel attempted to expand its power, which caused frequent conflicts with the neighboring villages, including La Heutte.

The first glass factory, at Le Van north of the village, dates from before 1370. Another glass factory opened in the valley at the end of the 15th century and remained in operation until the early 17th century. Between 1650 and 1750 the village expanded toward the Suze river as the population grew. A thriving pottery industry and a large mill developed along the river. The first school was built in the 1839. In 1876 a train station was built in the village, which encouraged the growth of the watch industry. Two years later, the Ammann watch factory opened in the old Bendit mill. In 1895 the Urania Watch Company replaced Ammann in the mill. It was, in turn, replaced by the Weber wire drawing factory in 1938. During a watchmaking boom between 1950 and 1974, numerous small watch and watch part workshops opened in the village. The A16 motorway connected La Heutte with Biel in 1985, transforming the village into a bedroom community.

In 1995, about a dozen tracks of three-toed dinosaurs were discovered in the municipality.

== Geography ==
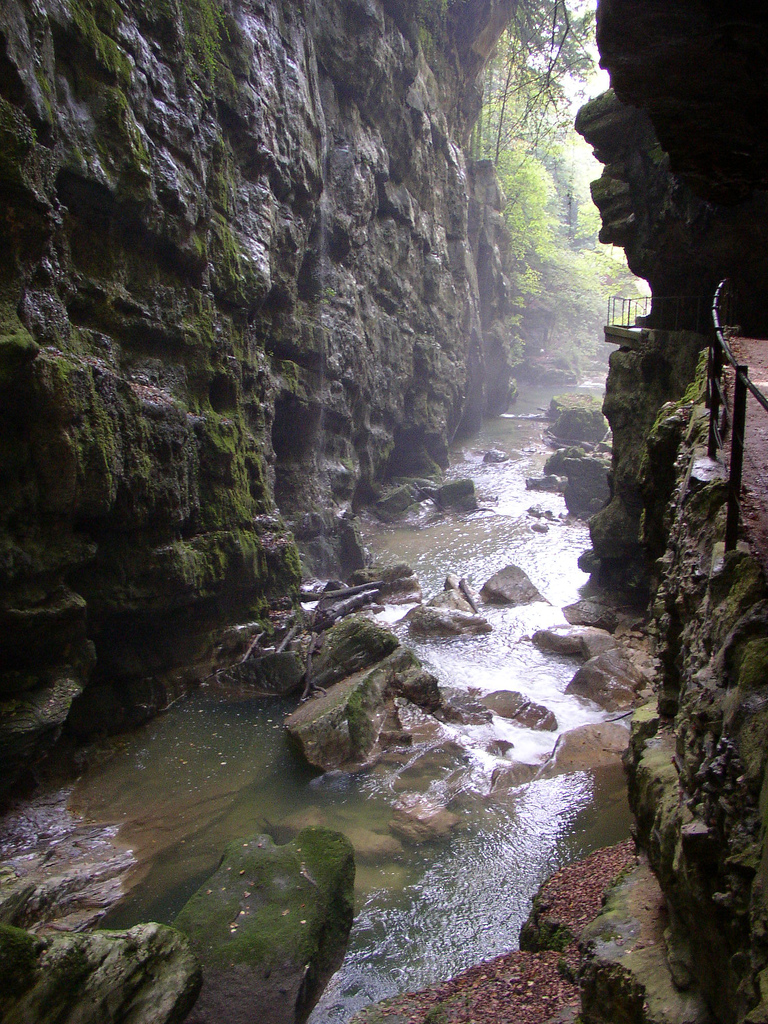
Taubenlochschlucht (Taubenloch Canyon) in the municipality

The former municipalities that now make up Péry-La Heutte have a total combined area of 23.78 km^{2} (9.18 sq mi).

== Demographics ==
The total population of Péry-La Heutte (as of December 2020) is 1,908.

== Historic population ==
The historical population is given in the following chart:

== Heritage sites of national significance ==
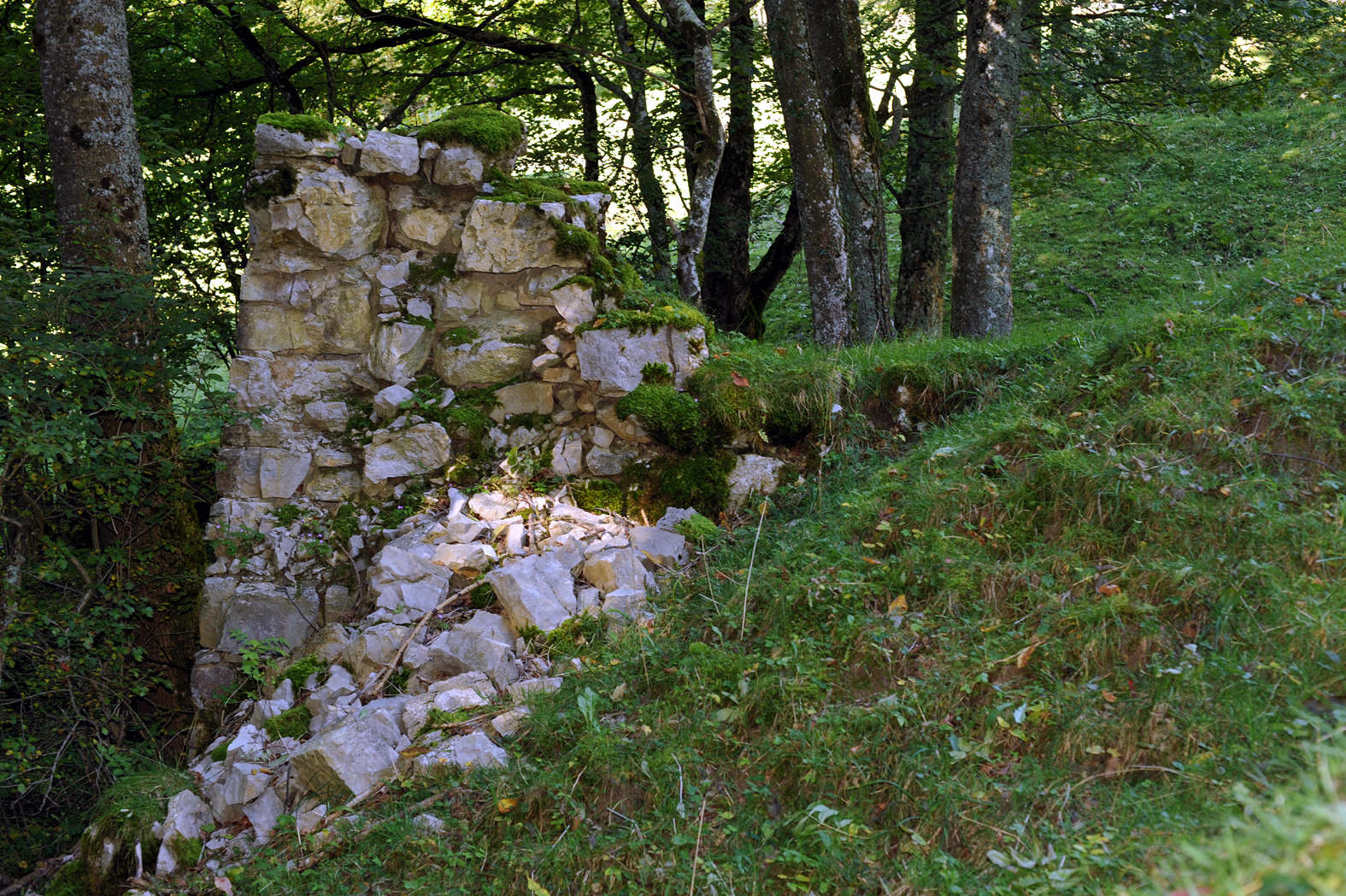
Ruins of the Le Van medieval glass factory

The Le Van, a medieval glass factory, is listed as a Swiss heritage site of national significance. The entire Taubenloch canyon is designated as part of the Inventory of Swiss Heritage Sites.

== Transportation ==
Péry-La Heutte has two railway stations: Reuchenette-Péry and La Heutte. Both are located on the Biel/Bienne–La Chaux-de-Fonds line, with hourly service to Biel/Bienne, Moutier, and La Chaux-de-Fonds.
