= La Heutte railway station =

Railway station in Péry-La Heutte, Switzerland

La Heutte
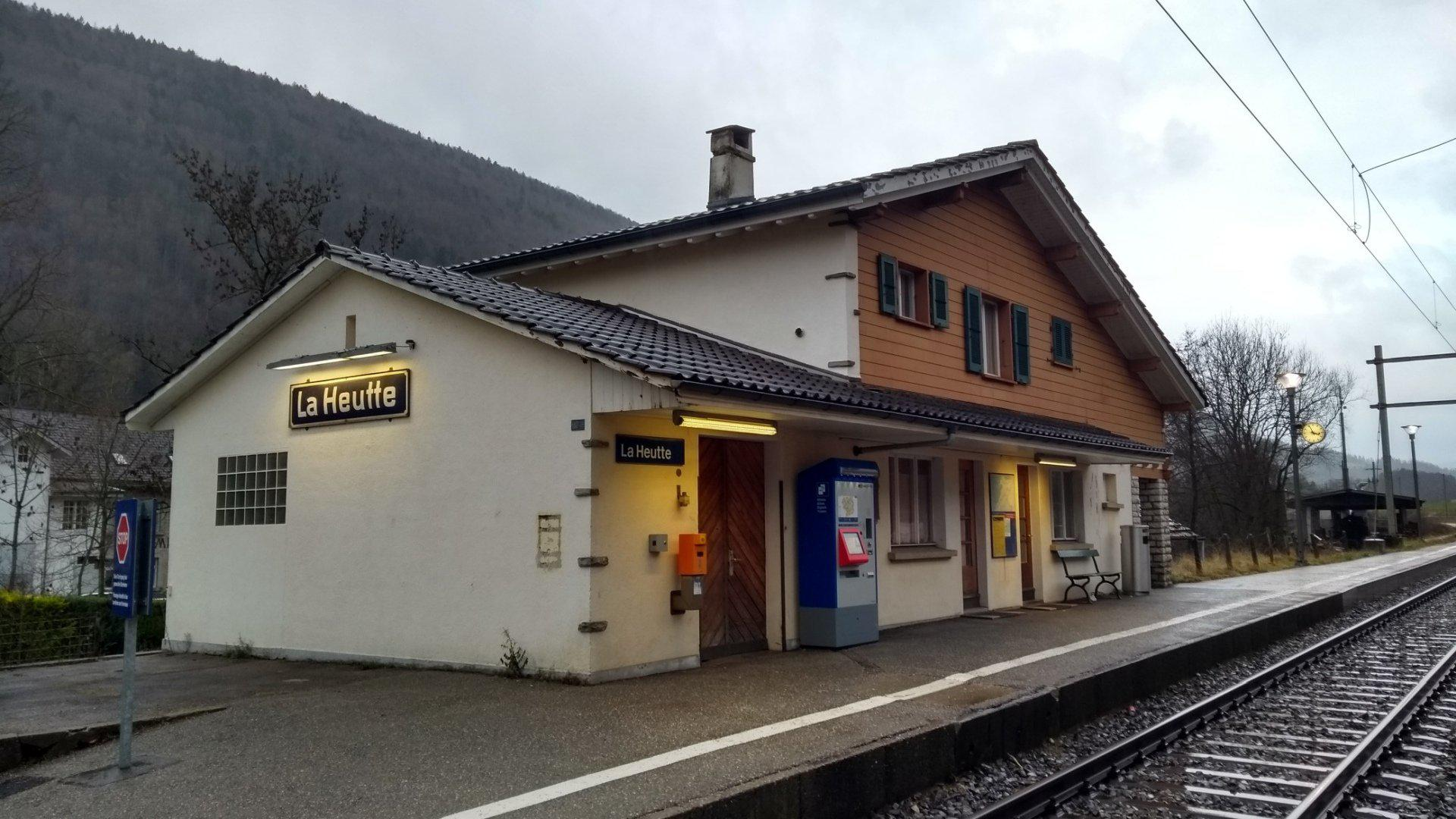
- The station in 2018

General information
- Location: Péry-La Heutte; Switzerland
- Coordinates: 47°11′22″N 7°13′31″E
- Elevation: 608 m (1,995 ft)
- Owner: Swiss Federal Railways
- Line: Biel/Bienne–La Chaux-de-Fonds line
- Distance: 43.7 km (27.2 mi) from Bern
- Platforms: 1 side platform
- Tracks: 1
- Train operators: Swiss Federal Railways

Construction
- Accessible: No

Other information
- Station code: 8504303 (LHE)
- Fare zone: 321 (Libero)

Passengers
- 2023: 160 per weekday (SBB)

Services
| Preceding station | SBB CFF FFS | Following station |
|---|---|---|
| Sonceboz-Sombeval towards La Chaux-de-Fonds or Moutier | R41 | Reuchenette-Péry towards Biel/Bienne |
Location

La Heutte railway station (French: Gare de La Heutte) is a railway station in the municipality of Péry-La Heutte, in the Swiss canton of Bern. It is an intermediate stop on the standard gauge Biel/Bienne–La Chaux-de-Fonds line of Swiss Federal Railways.

== Services ==
As of the December 2023 timetable change, the following services stop at La Heutte:

- Regio: hourly service between La Chaux-de-Fonds or Moutier and Biel/Bienne.
