= Reuchenette-Péry railway station =

Railway station in Péry-La Heutte, Switzerland

Reuchenette-Péry
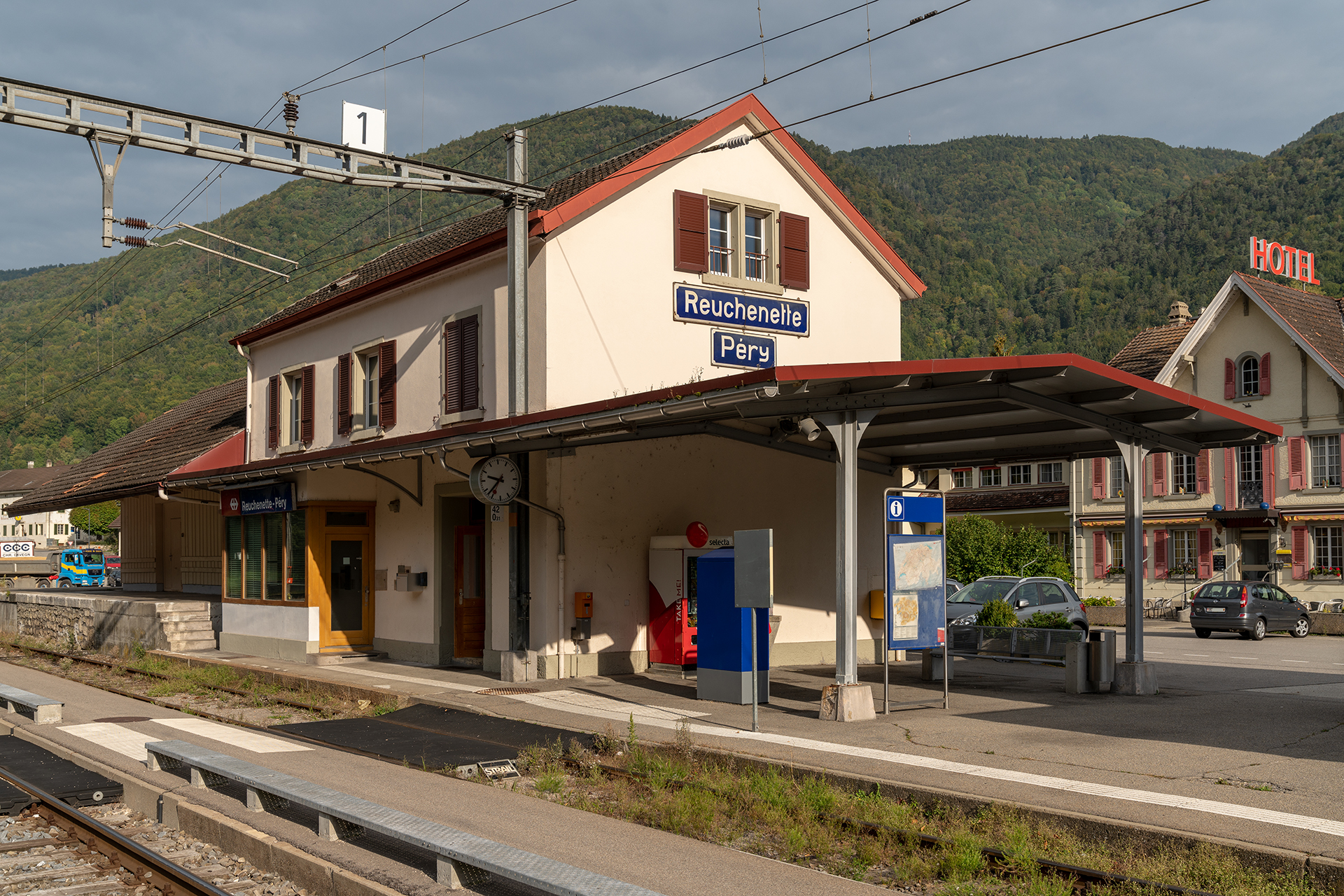
- The station in 2018

General information
- Location: Péry-La Heutte; Switzerland
- Coordinates: 47°11′23″N 7°14′49″E
- Elevation: 596 m (1,955 ft)
- Owner: Swiss Federal Railways
- Line: Biel/Bienne–La Chaux-de-Fonds line
- Distance: 42.0 km (26.1 mi) from Bern
- Platforms: 2
- Tracks: 5
- Train operators: Swiss Federal Railways

Construction
- Parking: 10
- Accessible: No

Other information
- Station code: 8504302 (REU)
- Fare zone: 321 (Libero)

Passengers
- 2023: 750 per weekday (SBB)

Services
Preceding station	SBB CFF FFS	Following station
La Heutte towards La Chaux-de-Fonds or Moutier	R41	Frinvillier-Taubenloch towards Biel/Bienne
Location

Reuchenette-Péry railway station (French: Gare de Reuchenette-Péry) is a railway station in the municipality of Péry-La Heutte, in the Swiss canton of Bern. It is an intermediate stop on the standard gauge Biel/Bienne–La Chaux-de-Fonds line of Swiss Federal Railways.

== Services ==
As of the December 2023 timetable change, the following services stop at Reuchenette-Péry:

- Regio: hourly service between La Chaux-de-Fonds or Moutier and Biel/Bienne.
