= Rebévelier =

- Municipality
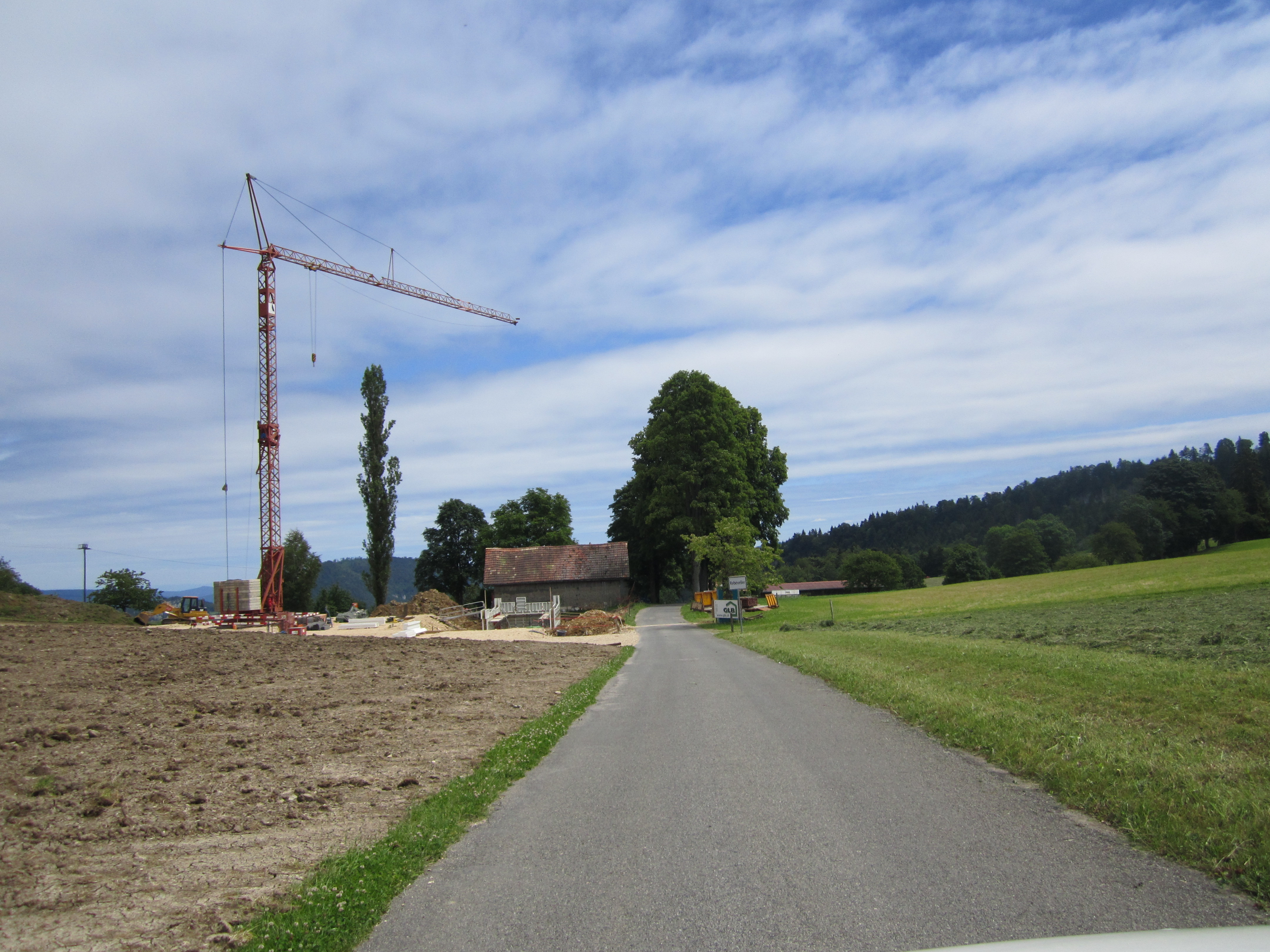
- The road into Rebévelier village

- Flag Coat of arms
- Location of Rebévelier
- Location within Switzerland Location within Canton of Bern
- Coordinates: 47°18′N 7°12′E
- Country: Switzerland
- Canton: Bern
- District: Jura bernois

Government
  - Mayor: Maire

Area
  - Total: 3.52 km^{2} (1.36 sq mi)
- Elevation: 960 m (3,150 ft)

Population (Dec 2011)
  - Total: 46
  - Density: 13/km^{2} (34/sq mi)
- Time zone: UTC+01:00 (CET)
  - Summer (DST): UTC+02:00 (CEST)
- Postal code: 2717
- SFOS number: 715
- ISO 3166 code: CH-BE
- Surrounded by: Châtelat, Monible, Lajoux, Saulcy, Undervelier
- Website: website missing SFSO statistics

Rebévilier is a municipality in the Jura bernois administrative district in the canton of Bern in Switzerland. It is located in the French-speaking Bernese Jura (Jura Bernois).

== History ==
Rebévelier is first mentioned in 1181 as Robervilier.

The noble Rebévelier family appears in historic records during the 13th and 14th centuries. For most of its history, the village was owned by Bellelay Abbey under the Prince-Bishop of Basel. Until the Protestant Reformation of 1531, it was part of the parish of Sapran. However, Rebévelier remained Catholic when the surrounding communities converted. Rebévelier became part of the parish of Undervelier, while Les Cerniers joined the parish of Saulcy. After the 1797 French victory and the Treaty of Campo Formio, Rebévelier became part of the French Département of Mont-Terrible. Three years later, in 1800 it became part of the Département of Haut-Rhin. After Napoleon's defeat and the Congress of Vienna, Rebévelier was assigned to the Canton of Bern in 1815.

By the end of the 19th century, most of the French-speaking Catholic residents had moved away and the village was now German speaking and Mennonite. In 1974-75, during the voting that led to the creation of the Canton of Jura, Rebévelier wished to remain part of the Canton of Bern. Therefore, in 1976, they were administratively moved from the Delémont district into the Moutier district so they could remain in Bern.

== Geography ==
Rebévelier has an area of 3.55 km^{2} (1.37 sq mi). As of 2012, a total of 2.12 km^{2} (0.82 mi^{2}) or 59.7% is used for agricultural purposes, while 1.41 km^{2} (0.54 mi^{2}) or 39.7% is forested. Of the rest of the land, 0.02 km^{2} (4.9 acres) or 0.6% is settled (buildings or roads).

During the same year, housing and buildings made up 0.6%. Out of the forested land, 34.6% of the total land area is heavily forested and 5.1% is covered with orchards or small clusters of trees. Of the agricultural land, 5.9% is used for growing crops and 27.9% is pastures and 25.6% is used for alpine pastures.

The municipality is located west of the Pichoux gorge. It consists of the hamlets of Rebévelier and Les Cerniers.

The municipalities of Châtelat, Monible, Sornetan, Souboz and Rebévelier were considering a merger on 1 January 2015 into a new municipality, Petit-Val. When Rebévelier chose to not go forward with the merger, the other four municipalities merged on 1 January 2015.

On 31 December 2009 District de Moutier, the municipality's former district, was dissolved. On the following day, 1 January 2010, it joined the newly created Arrondissement administratif Jura bernois.

== Coat of arms ==
The blazon of the municipal coat of arms is Or a Deer Sable attired and hoofed Gules trippant on a Mount of 5 Coupeaux Vert.

== Demographics ==
Rebévelier has a population (as of December 2020) of 41, all Swiss citizens. Over the last 10 years (2001-2011) the population has changed at a rate of -2.1%, all due to migration.

Most of the population (as of 2000) speaks German (20 or 66.7%) as their first language with the rest speaking French.

As of 2008, the population was 59.6% male and 40.4% female. The population was made up of 28 Swiss men and 19 Swiss women. Of the population in the municipality, 22 or about 73.3% were born in Rebévelier and lived there in 2000. There were 5 or 16.7% who were born in the same canton, while 3 or 10.0% were born somewhere else in Switzerland, and or 0.0% were born outside of Switzerland.

As of 2011, children and teenagers (0–19 years old) make up 34.8% of the population, while adults (20–64 years old) make up 41.3% and seniors (over 64 years old) make up 23.9%.

As of 2000, there were 16 people who were single and never married in the municipality. There were 13 married individuals and 1 widow or widower.

As of 2010, there were 3 households that consist of only one person and 4 households with five or more people. In 2000, a total of 9 apartments (52.9% of the total) were permanently occupied, while 5 apartments (29.4%) were seasonally occupied and 3 apartments (17.6%) were empty. In 2011, single family homes made up 46.7% of the total housing in the municipality.

The historical population is given in the following chart:

== Politics ==
In the 2011 federal election the most popular party was the Swiss People's Party (SVP) which received 43.6% of the vote. The next three most popular parties were the Evangelical People's Party (EVP) (17.2%), the Christian Social Party (CSP) (17.2%) and the Conservative Democratic Party (BDP) (16.6%). In the federal election, a total of 23 votes were cast, and the voter turnout was 69.7%.

== Economy ==
As of 2011, Rebévelier had an unemployment rate of 2.6%. As of 2008, there were a total of 23 people employed in the municipality. Of these, there were 23 people employed in the primary economic sector and about 7 businesses involved in this sector. No one was employed in the secondary sector or the tertiary sector. There were 16 residents of the municipality who were employed in some capacity, of which females made up 18.8% of the workforce.

In 2008 there were a total of 18 full-time equivalent jobs, all in agriculture.

In 2000, there were 4 workers who commuted away from the municipality. A total of 12 workers both lived and worked in Rebévelier.

In 2011 the average local and cantonal tax rate on a married resident, with two children, of Rebévelier making 150,000 CHF was 13.5%, while an unmarried resident's rate was 19.9%. For comparison, the rate for the entire canton in the same year, was 14.2% and 22.0%, while the nationwide rate was 12.3% and 21.1% respectively. In 2009 there were a total of 13 tax payers in the municipality. Of that total, 2 made over 75,000 CHF per year. The greatest number of workers, 5, made between 50,000 and 75,000 CHF per year. The average income of the over 75,000 CHF group in Rebévelier was 100,100 CHF, while the average across all of Switzerland was 130,478 CHF. In 2011, 0.0% of the population received direct financial assistance from the government.

== Religion ==
From the 2000 census, 6 or 20.0% were Roman Catholic, while 1 or 3.3% belonged to the Swiss Reformed Church. Of the rest of the population, there were 23 individuals (or about 76.67% of the population) who belonged to another Christian church.

== Education ==
In Rebévelier about 38.5% of the population have completed non-mandatory upper secondary education, and 23.1% have completed additional higher education (either university or a Fachhochschule). Of the 3 who had completed some form of tertiary schooling listed in the census, all were Swiss men.

As of 2000, there were no students attending any school in the municipality. During the same year, 7 residents attended schools outside the municipality.
