= Petit-Val =

- Municipality
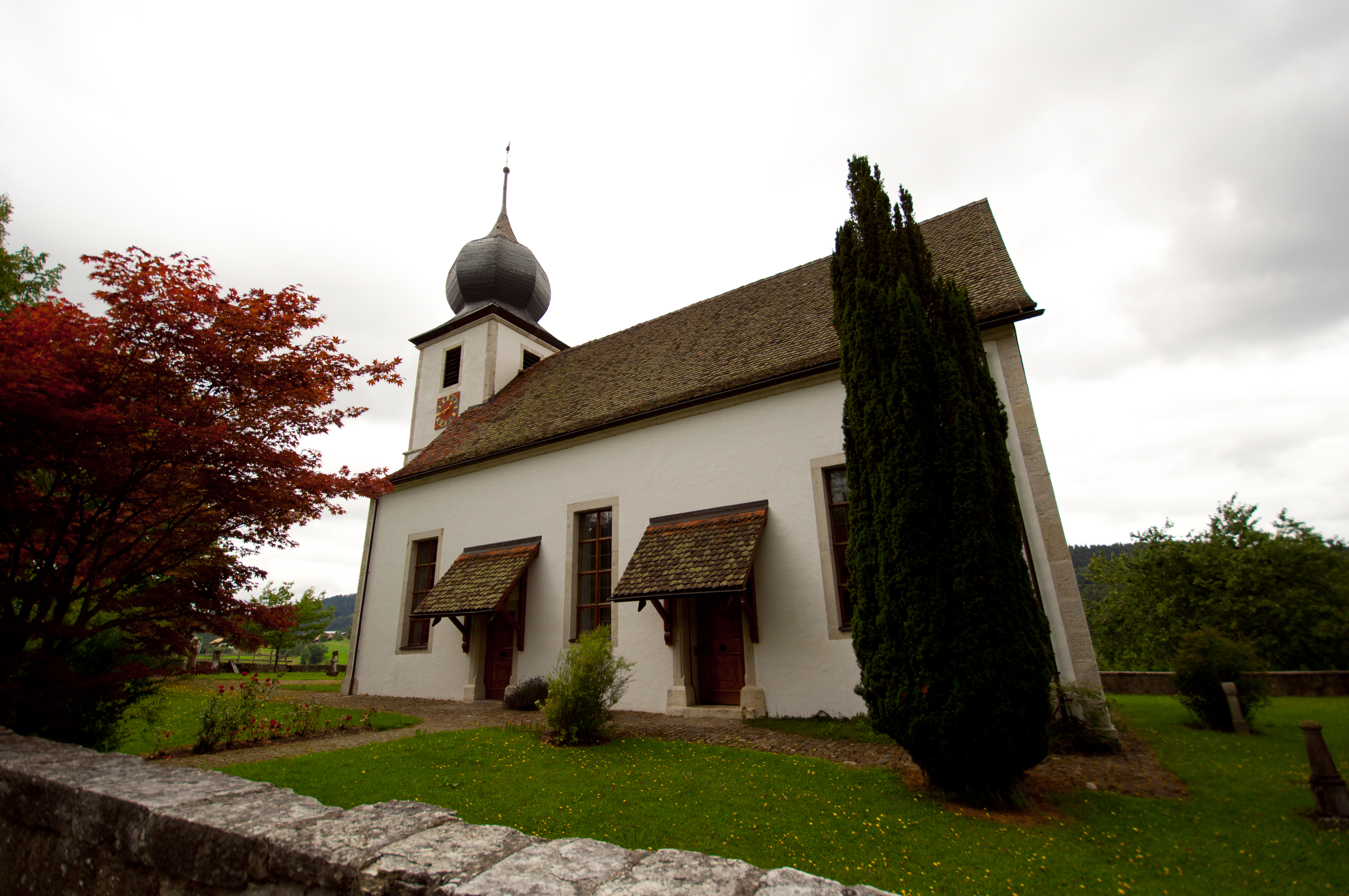
- Sornetan village church

- Flag Coat of arms
- Location of Petit-Val
- Location within Switzerland Location within Canton of Bern
- Coordinates: 47°17′N 7°13′E
- Country: Switzerland
- Canton: Bern
- District: Jura bernois

Government
  - Mayor: Maire; Willy Pasche

Area
  - Total: 5.62 km^{2} (2.17 sq mi)
- Elevation: 843 m (2,766 ft)

Population (Dec 2011)
  - Total: 129
  - Density: 23.0/km^{2} (59.4/sq mi)
- Time zone: UTC+01:00 (CET)
  - Summer (DST): UTC+02:00 (CEST)
- Postal code: 2715/2716/2748
- SFOS number: 716
- ISO 3166 code: CH-BE
- Surrounded by: Saicourt, Saules, Undervelier
- Website: http://www.petit-val.ch/ SFSO statistics

Petit-Val is a municipality in the Jura bernois administrative district in the canton of Bern in Switzerland. It is located in the French-speaking Bernese Jura (Jura Bernois). On 1 January 2015 the former municipalities of Châtelat, Monible, Sornetan and Souboz merged to form the new municipality of Petit-Val.

== History ==
=== Châtelat ===
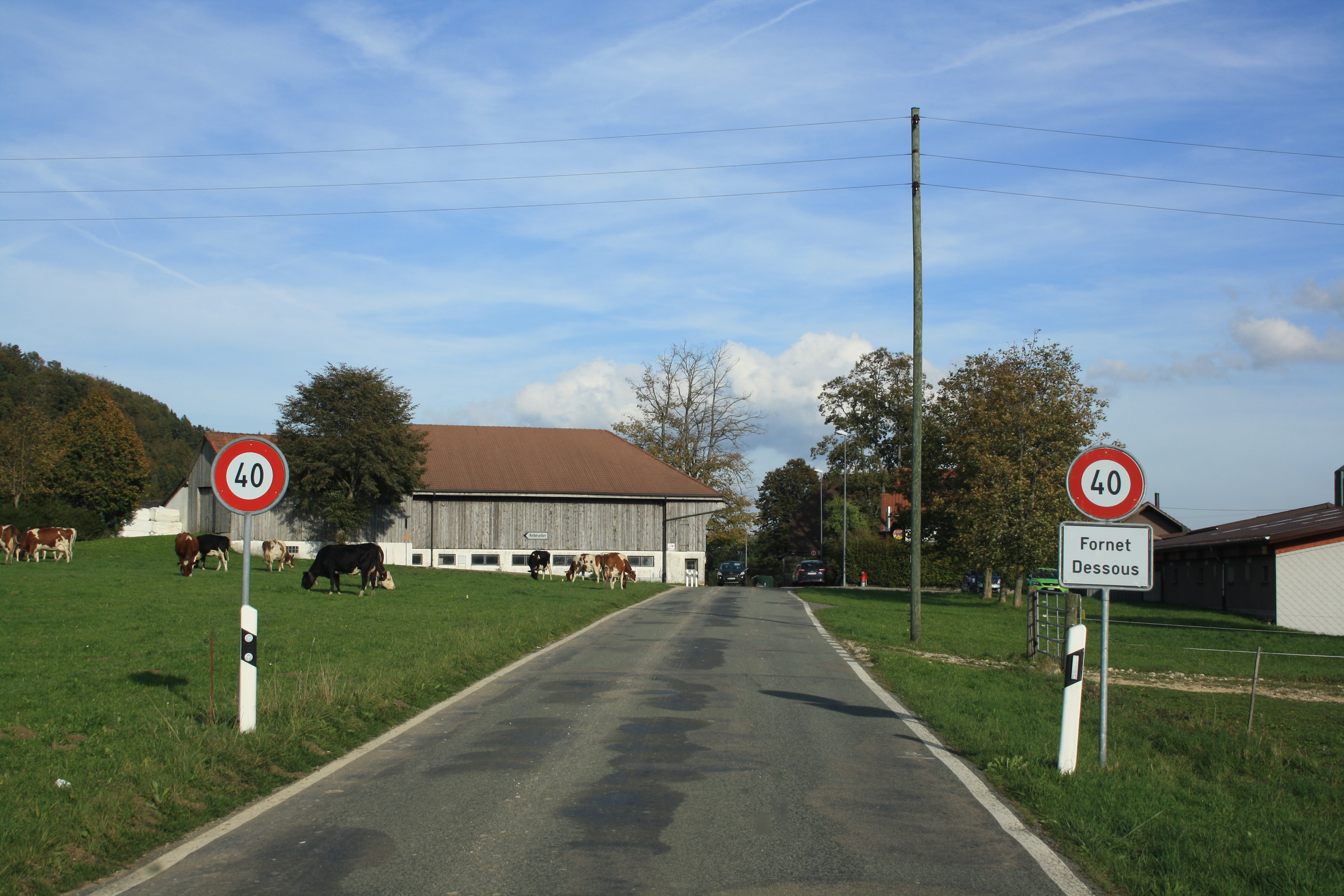
Fornet-Dessous village is one of the three that makes up the Châtelat municipality

Châtelat is first mentioned in 1335 as Schestellat.

For most of the village's history, it belonged to the court and parish of Sornetan under the provost of Moutier-Grandval Abbey. Châtelat remained part of the parish after they both converted to the new faith during the Protestant Reformation in 1531. In the following years, a colony of Mennonites was established in the village of Moron on the slopes of the Moron mountain. Moron was located at the far end of the valley, at an elevation of 1,020 m (3,350 ft) and like many Mennonite settlements was in a poorly accessible location. After the 1797 French victory and the Treaty of Campo Formio, Châtelat became part of the French Département of Mont-Terrible. Three years later, in 1800 it became part of the Département of Haut-Rhin. After Napoleon's defeat and the Congress of Vienna, Châtelat was assigned to the Canton of Bern in 1815. During the period of French control, the village of Fornet-Dessous was an independent municipality. At some point after Bern assumed control, it was integrated into the Châtelat municipality. In 1829 the village of Fornet-Dessous was completely destroyed in a fire.

Today, the village remains fairly rural and agrarian. About two-thirds of the workers work in the municipality and about two-thirds of the jobs in the municipality are in agriculture.

=== Monible ===
Monible is first mentioned in 1403 as Montnible, though this comes from document that was written in 1414. In 1537 it was mentioned as Monible.

For much of its history, Monible was part of the Amt or township of Sornetan under the provost of Moutier-Grandval Abbey who was under the Prince-Bishop of Basel. Most of the village was destroyed by a fire in 1743. After the 1798 French invasion, Monible became part of the French Département of Mont-Terrible. Three years later, in 1800 it became part of the Département of Haut-Rhin. After Napoleon's defeat and the Congress of Vienna, Monible was assigned to the Canton of Bern in 1815.

The village's population has been steadily declining since the 19th century. In 1956 the municipal primary school closed and today only a kindergarten is open.

=== Sornetan ===
Sornetan is first mentioned in 1179 as Sornetan. The municipality was formerly known by its German name Sornetal, however, that name is no longer used.

The area around Sornetan was inhabited since antiquity. Some of the earliest finds are scattered items from the Celtic tribes that lived in the area. They were followed by the Romans and then by the Burgundians. A noble family using the Sornetan name appear in historic records from the 12th until the 14th centuries. The village was eventually acquired by the college of canons of Moutier-Grandval Abbey. When the Abbey was suppressed during the Protestant Reformation, Sornetan was placed under the provost of Moutier-Grandval who was under the Prince-Bishop of Basel. After the 1797 French victory and the Treaty of Campo Formio, Sornetan became part of the French Département of Mont-Terrible. Three years later, in 1800 it became part of the Département of Haut-Rhin. After Napoleon's defeat and the Congress of Vienna, Sornetan was assigned to the Canton of Bern in 1815.

Until the Protestant Reformation of 1528, Sornetan was part of the parish of Sapran. After it adopted the new Reformed faith, it joined the Tavannes-Chaindon parish, but only remained until 1538. It then joined the Grandval parish and remained in that parish until 1571, when it joined Bévilard. Sornetan remained part of that parish for almost two centuries, but in 1746 it became an independent parish. The parish church was built in 1708-09 and today is a Swiss heritage site of national significance. It was renovated in 1964-67.

While the village has remained generally agrarian, beginning in the 1970s the services sector began gaining importance. One of the reasons for this change was the construction, in 1971, of a Swiss Reformed Church meeting and training center in the municipality.

=== Souboz ===
Souboz is first mentioned in 1398 as Subol.

For most of Souboz's history, it was owned by the college of canons of Moutier-Grandval Abbey under the Prince-Bishop of Basel. During the Protestant Reformation, the village accepted the new faith and became part of the parish of Moutier. After the 1797 French victory and the Treaty of Campo Formio, Souboz became part of the French Département of Mont-Terrible. Three years later, in 1800 it became part of the Département of Haut-Rhin. After Napoleon's defeat and the Congress of Vienna, Souboz was assigned to the Canton of Bern in 1815. In the early 20th century, the municipality was close to bankruptcy and from 1926 until 1937 the mayor of Moutier took over running Souboz to get it out of debt. Today the municipality is mostly agrarian, with about 80% of the local jobs in agriculture.

== Geography ==
The former municipalities that now make up Petit-Val have a total combined area of 23.9 km^{2} (9.23 sq mi).

== Demographics ==
The total population of Petit-Val (as of December 2020) is 392.

== Historic population ==
The historical population is given in the following chart:

== Heritage sites of national significance ==
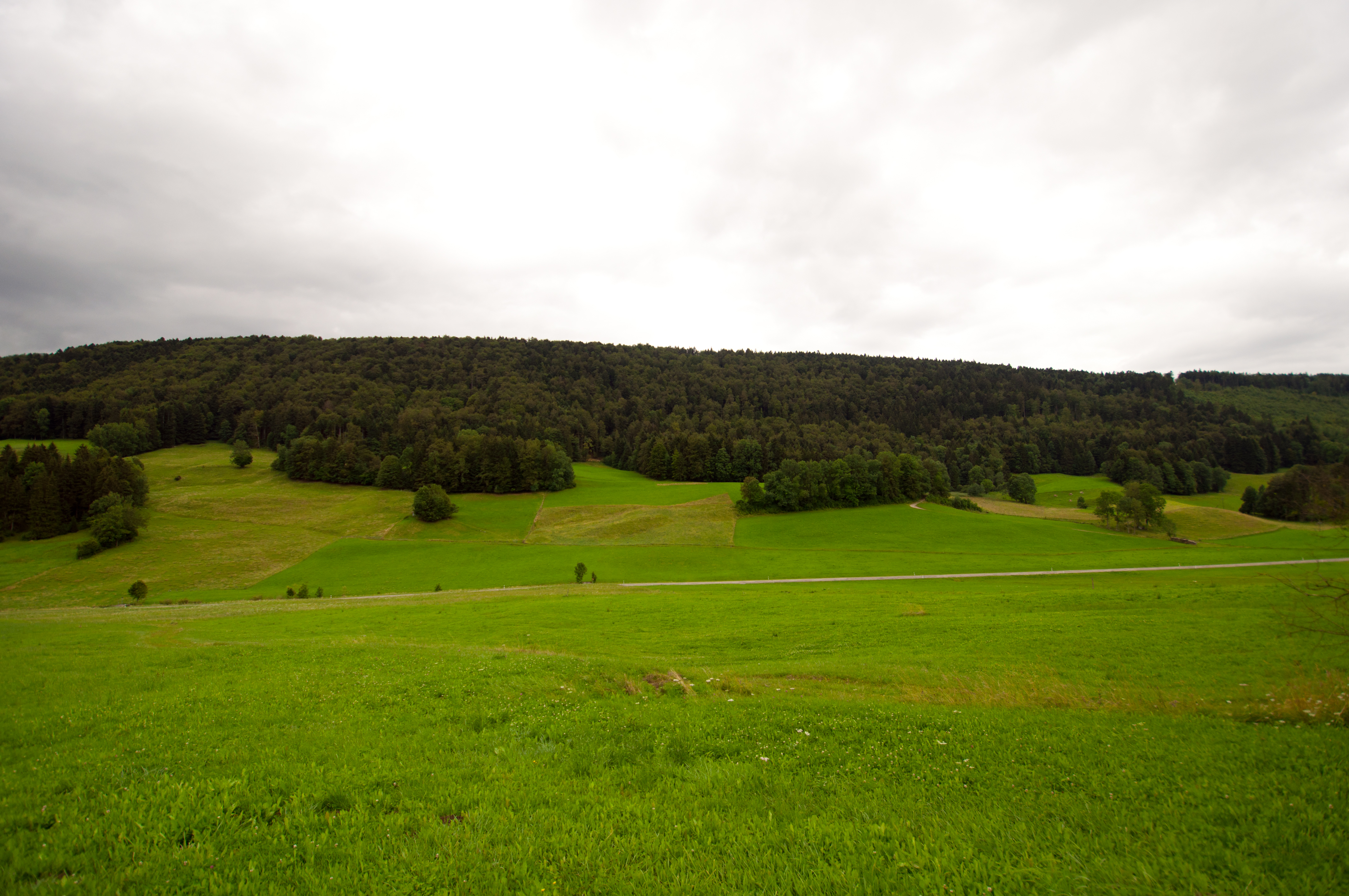
The site of the Forêts du Beucle mine

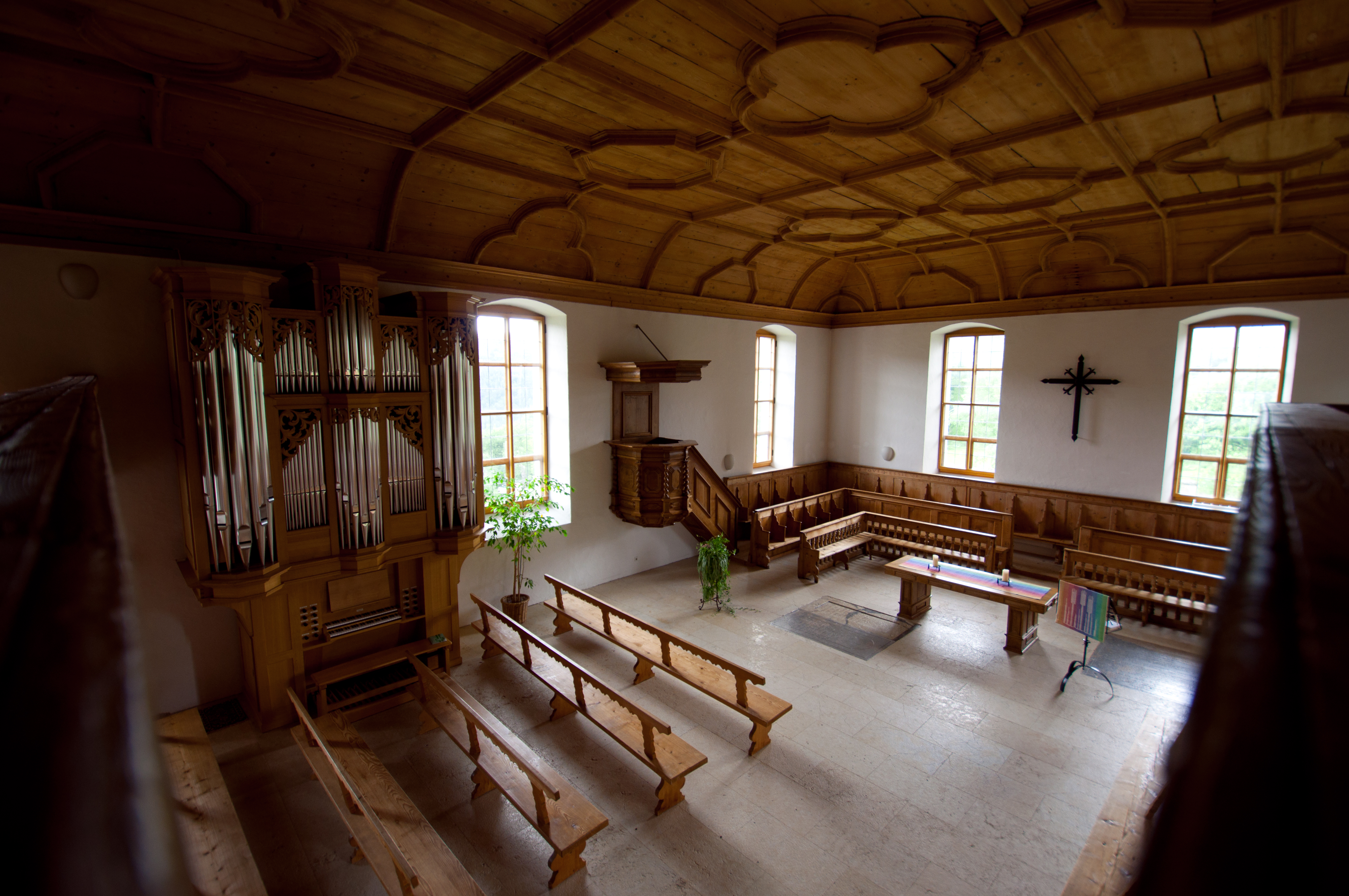
Interior of the Reformed village church in Sornetan

The Forêts du Beucle, a medieval iron mine, and the Sornetan village reformed church are listed as Swiss heritage sites of national significance. The entire villages of Châtelat and Souboz are designated as part of the Inventory of Swiss Heritage Sites.
