= Sornetan =

- Former municipality
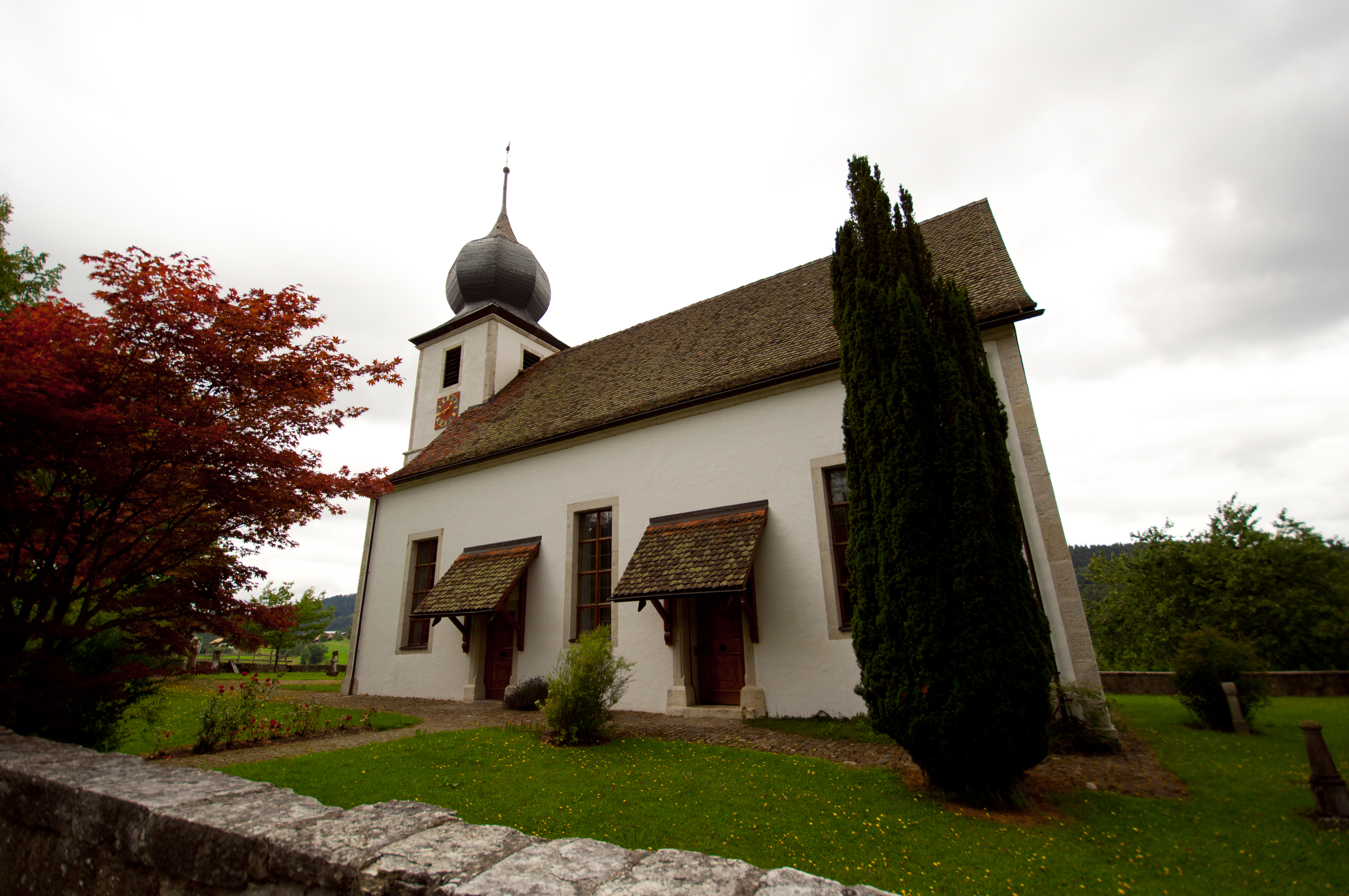
- Sornetan village church

- Flag Coat of arms
- Location of Sornetan
- Location within Switzerland Location within Canton of Bern
- Coordinates: 47°17′N 7°13′E
- Country: Switzerland
- Canton: Bern
- District: Jura bernois

Government
  - Mayor: Maire

Area
  - Total: 5.62 km^{2} (2.17 sq mi)
- Elevation: 843 m (2,766 ft)

Population (Dec 2011)
  - Total: 129
  - Density: 23.0/km^{2} (59.4/sq mi)
- Time zone: UTC+01:00 (CET)
  - Summer (DST): UTC+02:00 (CEST)
- Postal code: 2716
- SFOS number: 710
- ISO 3166 code: CH-BE
- Surrounded by: Monible, Châtelat, Saicourt, Saules, Souboz, Undervelier
- Website: www.petit-val.ch

Sornetan is a former municipality in the Jura bernois administrative district in the canton of Bern in Switzerland. It is located in the French-speaking Bernese Jura (Jura Bernois). On 1 January 2015 the former municipalities of Châtelat, Monible, Sornetan and Souboz merged to form the new municipality of Petit-Val.

== History ==
Sornetan is first mentioned in 1179 as Sornetan. The municipality was formerly known by its German name Sornetal, however, that name is no longer used.

The area around Sornetan was inhabited since antiquity. Some of the earliest finds are scattered items from the Celtic tribes that lived in the area. They were followed by the Romans and then by the Burgundians. A noble family using the Sornetan name appear in historic records from the 12th until the 14th centuries. The village was eventually acquired by the college of canons of Moutier-Grandval Abbey. When the Abbey was suppressed during the Protestant Reformation, Sornetan was placed under the provost of Moutier-Grandval who was under the Prince-Bishop of Basel. After the 1797 French victory and the Treaty of Campo Formio, Sornetan became part of the French Département of Mont-Terrible. Three years later, in 1800 it became part of the Département of Haut-Rhin. After Napoleon's defeat and the Congress of Vienna, Sornetan was assigned to the Canton of Bern in 1815.

Until the Protestant Reformation of 1528, Sornetan was part of the parish of Sapran. After it adopted the new Reformed faith, it joined the Tavannes-Chaindon parish, but only remained until 1538. It then joined the Grandval parish and remained in that parish until 1571, when it joined Bévilard. Sornetan remained part of that parish for almost two centuries, but in 1746 it became an independent parish. The parish church was built in 1708-09 and today is a Swiss heritage site of national significance. It was renovated in 1964-67.

While the village has remained generally agrarian, beginning in the 1970s the services sector began gaining importance. One of the reasons for this change was the construction, in 1971, of a Swiss Reformed Church meeting and training center in the municipality.

== Geography ==
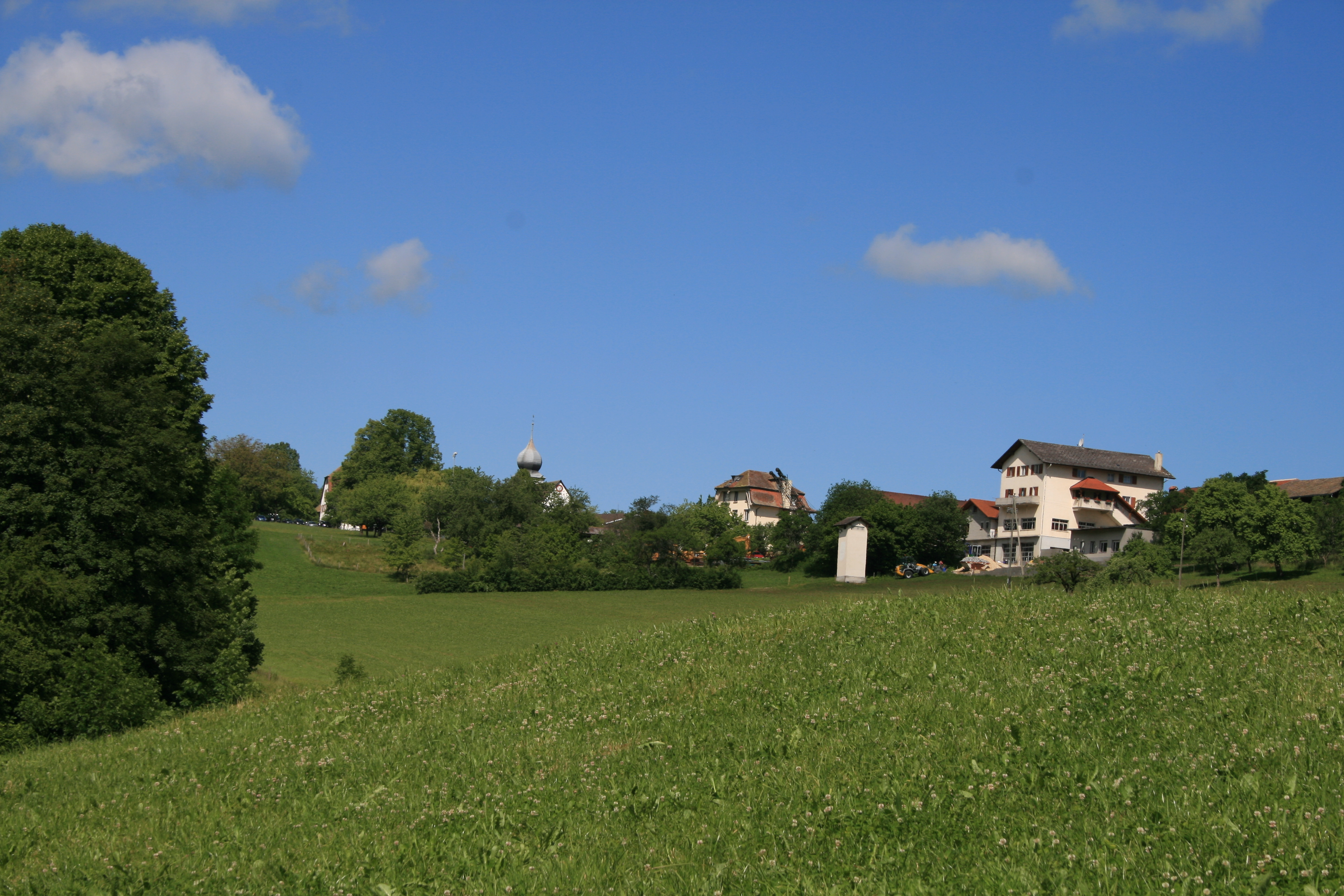
Sornetan village and surrounding fields

Before the merger, Sornetan had a total area of 5.7 km^{2} (2.2 mi^{2}). As of 2012, a total of 2.59 km^{2} (1.00 mi^{2}) or 45.9% is used for agricultural purposes, while 2.85 km^{2} (1.10 mi^{2}) or 50.5% is forested. Of the rest of the land, 0.18 km^{2} (0.069 mi^{2}) or 3.2% is settled (buildings or roads), 0.02 km^{2} (4.9 acres) or 0.4% is either rivers or lakes and 0.02 km^{2} (4.9 acres) or 0.4% is unproductive land.

During the same year, housing and buildings made up 1.4% and transportation infrastructure made up 1.4%. Out of the forested land, 45.6% of the total land area is heavily forested and 5.0% is covered with orchards or small clusters of trees. Of the agricultural land, 5.5% is used for growing crops and 23.4% is pastures and 16.1% is used for alpine pastures. All the water in the municipality is flowing water.

The former municipality is located in the hills near the source of the Sorne river.

On 31 December 2009 District de Moutier, the municipality's former district, was dissolved. On the following day, 1 January 2010, it joined the newly created Arrondissement administratif Jura bernois.

== Coat of arms ==
The blazon of the municipal coat of arms is Gules a Chevron Or in chief three Mullets of the same one and two and a Base wavy Azure.

== Demographics ==
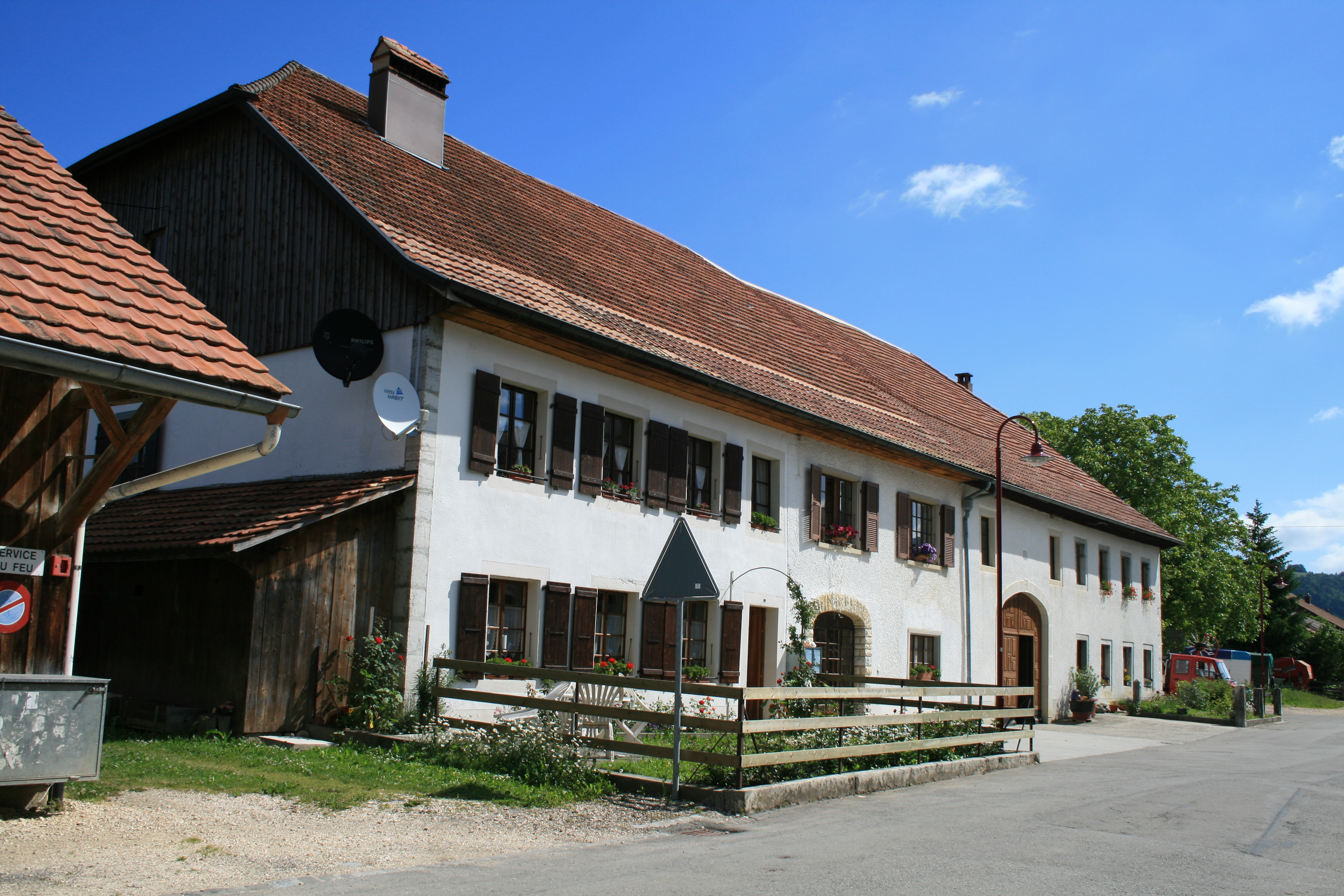
Sornetan village

Sornetan had a population (as of 2013) of 139. As of 2010, 4.0% of the population are resident foreign nationals. Over the last 10 years (2001-2011) the population has changed at a rate of 2.4%. Migration accounted for 0.8%, while births and deaths accounted for 0%.

Most of the population (as of 2000) speaks French (99 or 87.6%) as their first language, German is the second most common (11 or 9.7%) and Spanish is the third (1 or 0.9%).

As of 2008, the population was 53.2% male and 46.8% female. The population was made up of 65 Swiss men (51.6% of the population) and 2 (1.6%) non-Swiss men. There were 56 Swiss women (44.4%) and 3 (2.4%) non-Swiss women. Of the population in the municipality, 53 or about 46.9% were born in Sornetan and lived there in 2000. There were 31 or 27.4% who were born in the same canton, while 19 or 16.8% were born somewhere else in Switzerland, and 9 or 8.0% were born outside of Switzerland.

As of 2011, children and teenagers (0–19 years old) make up 23.3% of the population, while adults (20–64 years old) make up 67.4% and seniors (over 64 years old) make up 9.3%.

As of 2000, there were 51 people who were single and never married in the municipality. There were 55 married individuals, 5 widows or widowers and 2 individuals who are divorced.

As of 2010, there were 11 households that consist of only one person and households with five or more people. In 2000, a total of 36 apartments (65.5% of the total) were permanently occupied, while 13 apartments (23.6%) were seasonally occupied and 6 apartments (10.9%) were empty. The vacancy rate for the municipality, in 2012, was 1.61%. In 2011, single family homes made up 43.8% of the total housing in the municipality.

The historical population is given in the following chart:

== Heritage sites of national significance ==
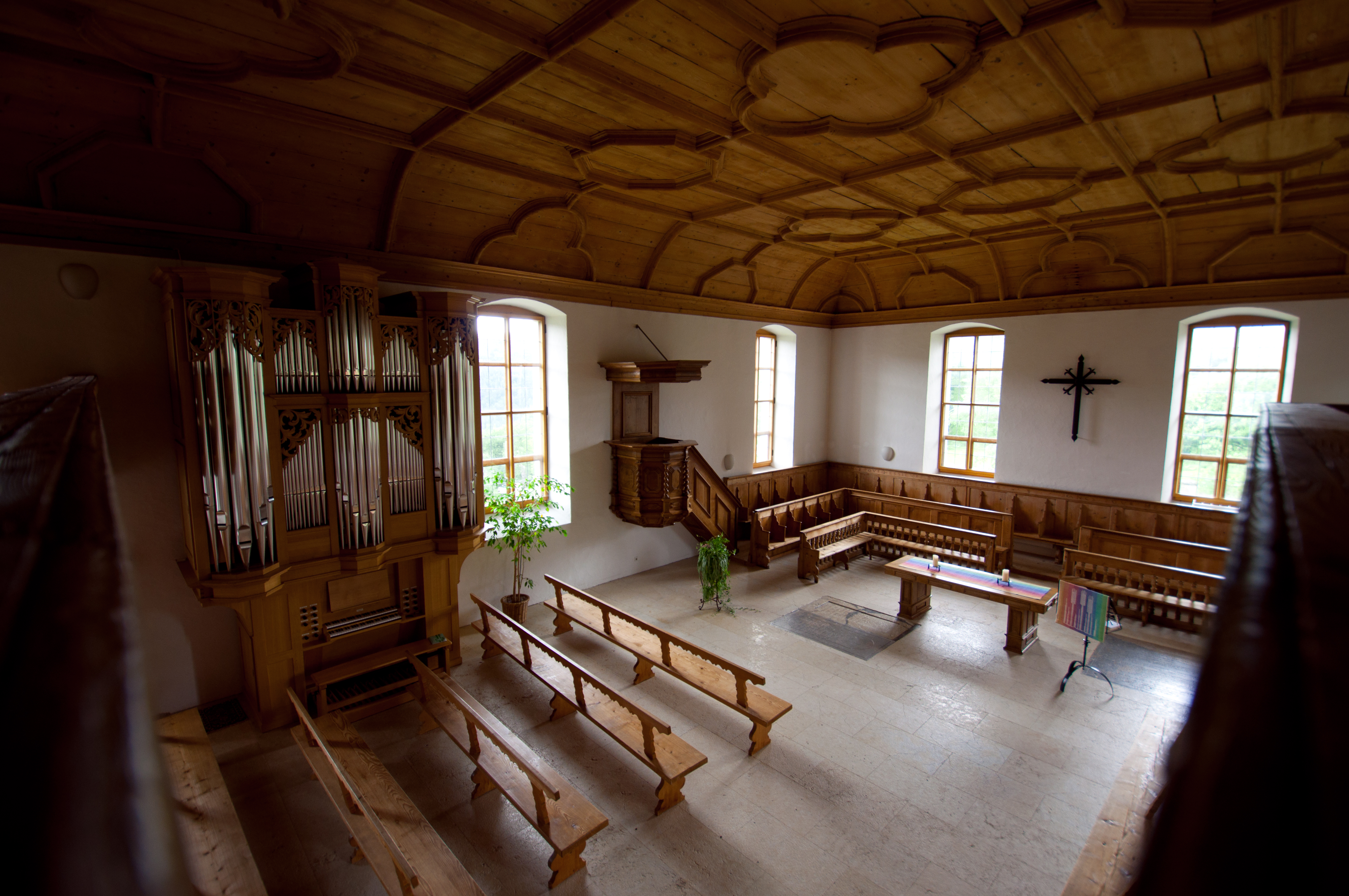
Interior of the Reformed village church

The village reformed church is listed as a Swiss heritage site of national significance.

== Politics ==
In the 2011 federal election the most popular party was the Swiss People's Party (SVP) which received 52.1% of the vote. The next three most popular parties were the Social Democratic Party (SP) (13.3%), the Green Party (11.1%) and the Conservative Democratic Party (BDP) (7.3%). In the federal election, a total of 47 votes were cast, and the voter turnout was 48.0%.

== Economy ==
As of 2011, Sornetan had an unemployment rate of 1.93%. As of 2008, there were a total of 64 people employed in the municipality. Of these, there were 27 people employed in the primary economic sector and about 9 businesses involved in this sector. 21 people were employed in the secondary sector and there were 5 businesses in this sector. 16 people were employed in the tertiary sector, with 2 businesses in this sector. There were 68 residents of the municipality who were employed in some capacity, of which females made up 44.1% of the workforce.

In 2008 there were a total of 45 full-time equivalent jobs. The number of jobs in the primary sector was 19, all in agriculture. The number of jobs in the secondary sector was 18 of which 9 were in manufacturing and 7 were in construction. The number of jobs in the tertiary sector was 8, all in a hotel or restaurant.

In 2000, there were 19 workers who commuted into the municipality and 25 workers who commuted away. The municipality is a net exporter of workers, with about 1.3 workers leaving the municipality for every one entering. A total of 43 workers (69.4% of the 62 total workers in the municipality) both lived and worked in Sornetan.

Of the working population, 8.8% used public transportation to get to work, and 32.4% used a private car.

In 2011 the average local and cantonal tax rate on a married resident, with two children, of Sornetan making 150,000 CHF was 13.6%, while an unmarried resident's rate was 20%. For comparison, the rate for the entire canton in the same year, was 14.2% and 22.0%, while the nationwide rate was 12.3% and 21.1% respectively. In 2009 there were a total of 54 tax payers in the municipality. Of that total, 15 made over 75,000 CHF per year. There was one person who made between 15,000 and 20,000 per year. The greatest number of workers, 17, made between 50,000 and 75,000 CHF per year. The average income of the over 75,000 CHF group in Sornetan was 87,873 CHF, while the average across all of Switzerland was 130,478 CHF. In 2011 a total of 0.8% of the population received direct financial assistance from the government.

== Religion ==
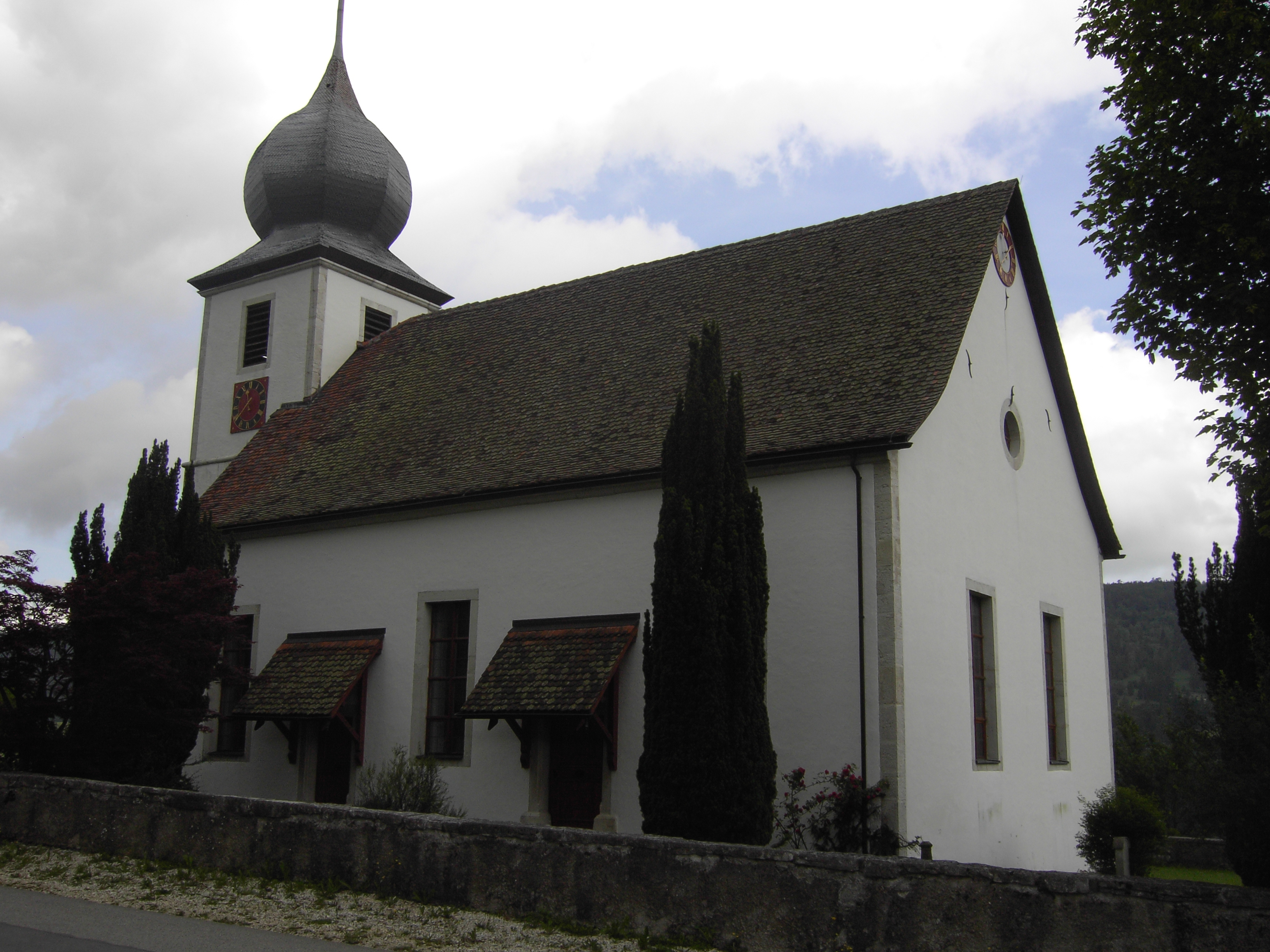
Church of Sornetan

From the 2000 census, 64 or 56.6% belonged to the Swiss Reformed Church, while 19 or 16.8% were Roman Catholic. Of the rest of the population, there were 18 individuals (or about 15.93% of the population) who belonged to another Christian church. 9 (or about 7.96% of the population) belonged to no church, are agnostic or atheist, and 3 individuals (or about 2.65% of the population) did not answer the question.

== Education ==
In Sornetan about 68.6% of the population have completed non-mandatory upper secondary education, and 12.9% have completed additional higher education (either university or a Fachhochschule). Of the 9 who had completed some form of tertiary schooling listed in the census, 66.7% were Swiss men, 22.2% were Swiss women.

As of 2000, there were a total of 9 students attending any school in the municipality. Of those, 6 both lived and attended school in the municipality, while 3 students came from another municipality. During the same year, 14 residents attended schools outside the municipality.
