= Châtelat =

Former municipality of Switzerland, canton of Bern

- Former municipality
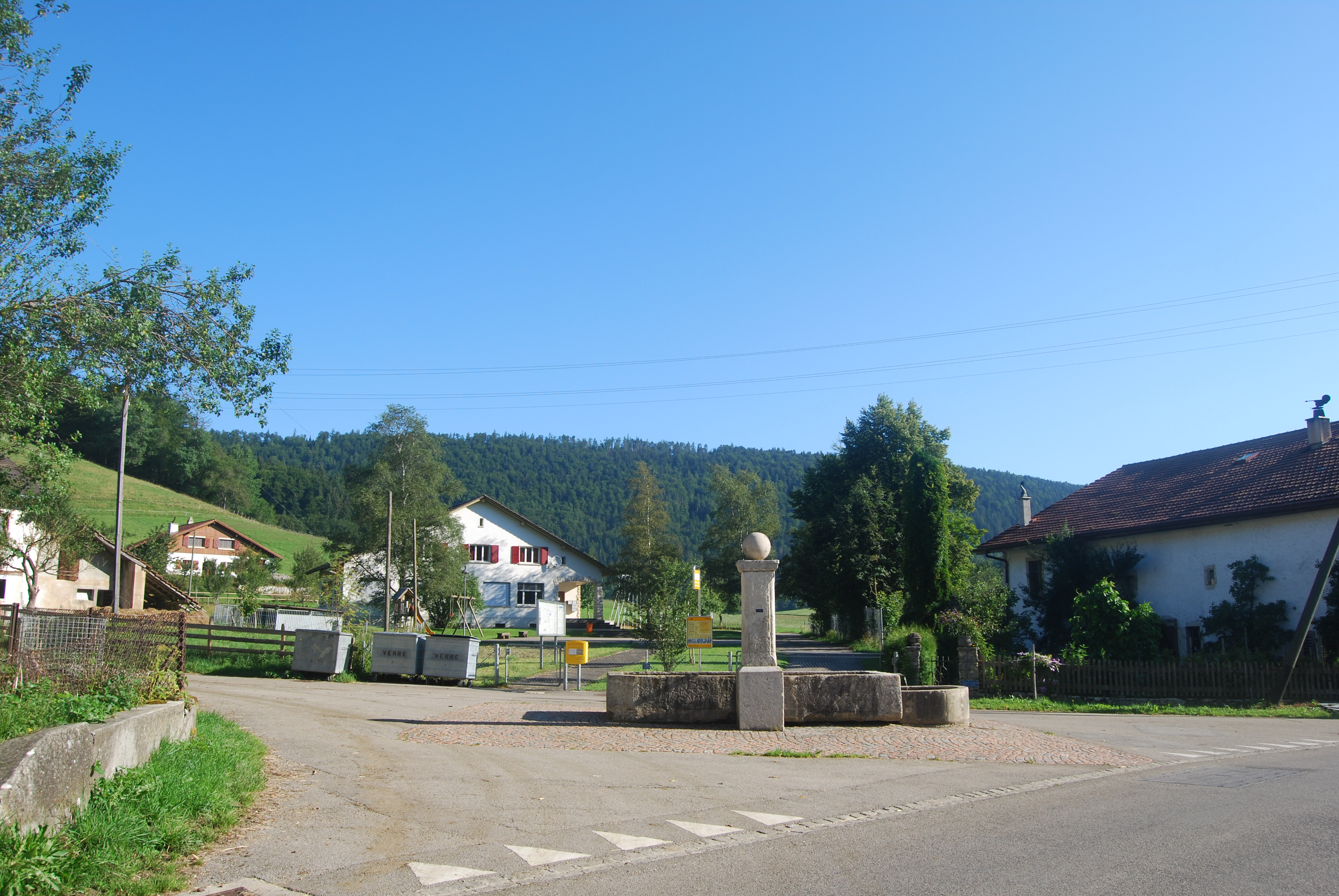
- Châtelat village

- Flag Coat of arms
- Location of Châtelat
- Location within Switzerland Location within Canton of Bern
- Coordinates: 47°16′N 7°12′E
- Country: Switzerland
- Canton: Bern
- District: Jura bernois

Government
  - Mayor: Maire

Area
  - Total: 4.09 km^{2} (1.58 sq mi)
- Elevation: 802 m (2,631 ft)

Population (Dec 2011)
  - Total: 111
  - Density: 27.1/km^{2} (70.3/sq mi)
- Time zone: UTC+01:00 (CET)
  - Summer (DST): UTC+02:00 (CEST)
- Postal code: 2715
- SFOS number: 684
- ISO 3166 code: CH-BE
- Surrounded by: Saicourt, Sornetan, Monible, Rebévelier, Lajoux (JU)
- Website: www.petit-val.ch

Châtelat (French pronunciation: [ʃatla]) was a municipality in the Jura bernois administrative district in the canton of Bern in Switzerland. It is located in the French-speaking Bernese Jura (Jura Bernois), however a majority of the residents in Châtelat are German speaking. On 1 January 2015 the former municipalities of Châtelat, Monible, Sornetan and Souboz merged to form the new municipality of Petit-Val.

== History ==
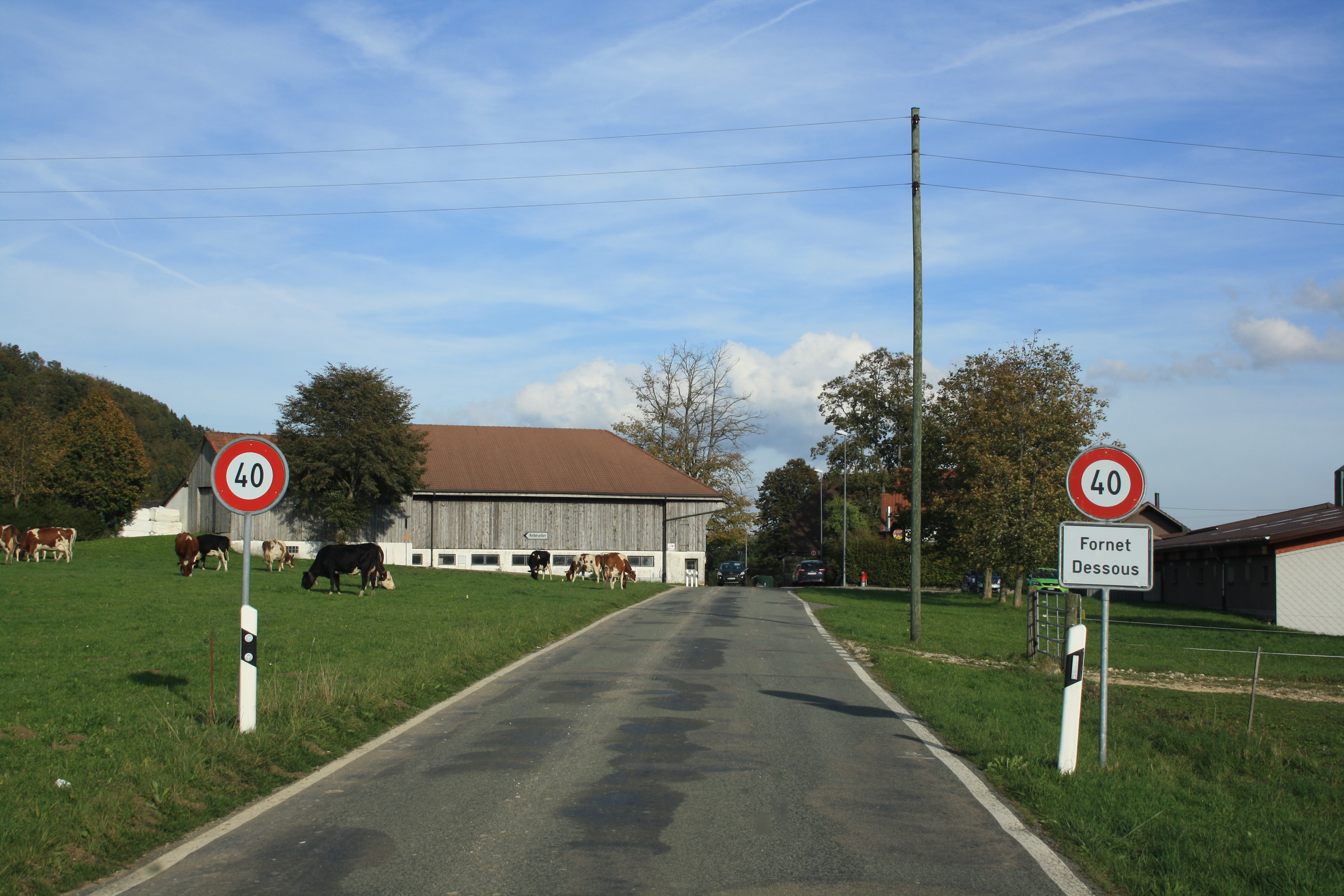
Fornet-Dessous village is one of the three that makes up the Châtelat municipality

Châtelat is first mentioned in 1335 as Schestellat.

For most of the village's history, it belonged to the court and parish of Sornetan under the provost of Moutier-Grandval Abbey. Châtelat remained part of the parish after they both converted to the new faith during the Protestant Reformation in 1531. In the following years, a colony of Mennonites was established in the village of Moron on the slopes of the Moron mountain. Moron was located at the far end of the valley, at an elevation of 1,020 m (3,350 ft) and like many Mennonite settlements was in a poorly accessible location. After the 1797 French victory and the Treaty of Campo Formio, Châtelat became part of the French Département of Mont-Terrible. Three years later, in 1800 it became part of the Département of Haut-Rhin. After Napoleon's defeat and the Congress of Vienna, Châtelat was assigned to the Canton of Bern in 1815. During the period of French control, the village of Fornet-Dessous was an independent municipality. At some point after Bern assumed control, it was integrated into the Châtelat municipality. In 1829 the village of Fornet-Dessous was completely destroyed in a fire.

Today, the village remains fairly rural and agrarian. About two-thirds of the workers work in the municipality and about two-thirds of the jobs in the municipality are in agriculture.

== Geography ==
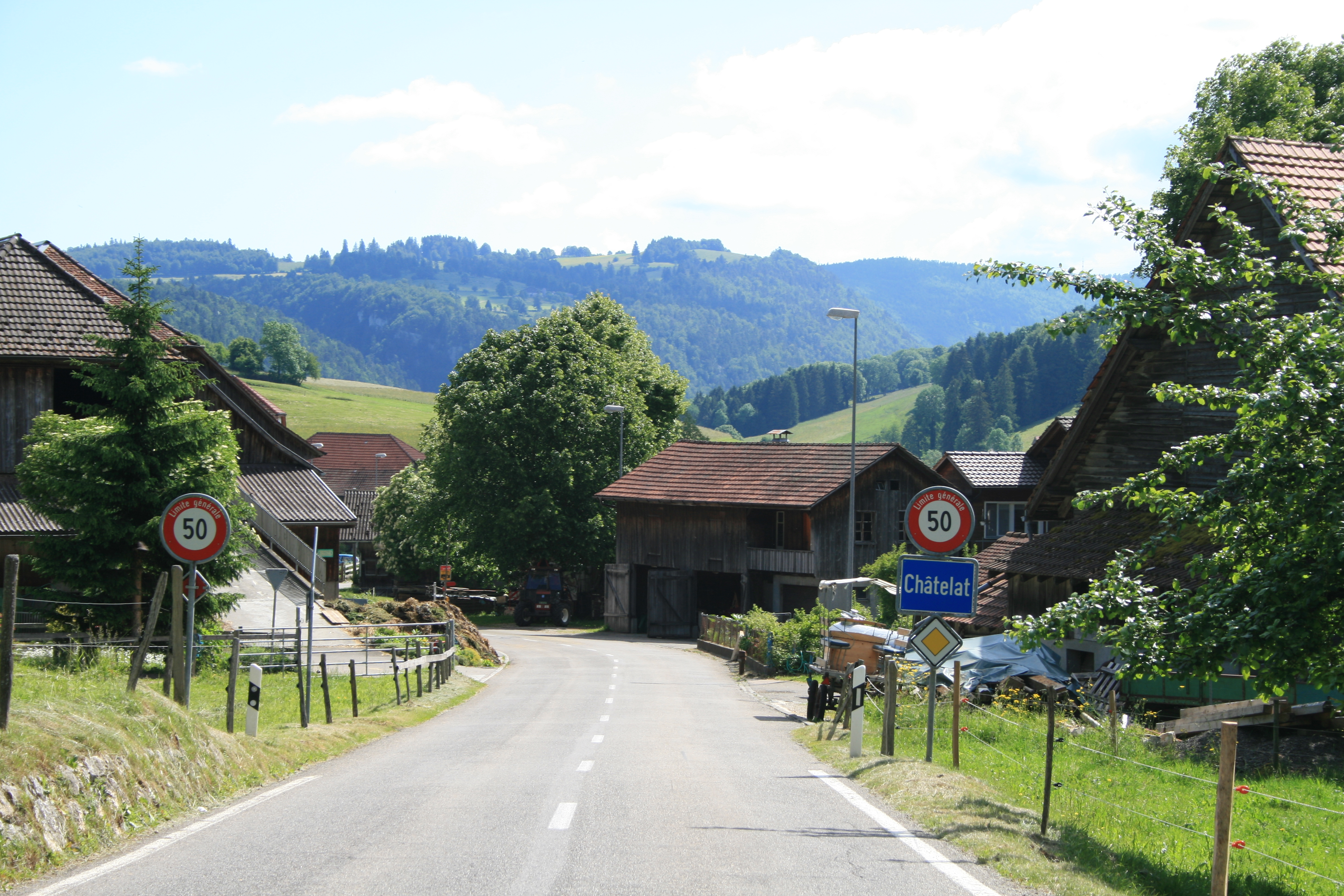
Châtelat village and surrounding hills

Before the merger, Châtelat had a total area of 4.2 km^{2} (1.6 mi^{2}). As of 2012, a total of 2.28 km^{2} (0.88 mi^{2}) or 54.9% is used for agricultural purposes, while 1.75 km^{2} (0.68 mi^{2}) or 42.2% is forested. Of the rest of the land, 0.11 km^{2} (27 acres) or 2.7% is settled (buildings or roads), 0.02 km^{2} (4.9 acres) or 0.5% is either rivers or lakes.

During the same year, housing and buildings made up 1.7% and transportation infrastructure made up 1.0%. Out of the forested land, 32.3% of the total land area is heavily forested and 9.9% is covered with orchards or small clusters of trees. Of the agricultural land, 2.2% is used for growing crops and 31.8% is pastures and 20.2% is used for alpine pastures. All the water in the municipality is flowing water.

The former municipality is located in the Moutier district in the Petit Val. The main village is split in half by the Pichoux-Strasse. It consists of the villages of Châtelat, Moron and Fornet-Dessous. The nearby village of Fornet-Dessus belongs to the municipality of Lajoux.

On 31 December 2009 District de Moutier, the municipality's former district, was dissolved. On the following day, 1 January 2010, it joined the newly created Arrondissement administratif Jura bernois.

== Coat of arms ==
The blazon of the municipal coat of arms is Argent a Tower embattled Sable issuant from a Mount of 3 Coupeaux Vert between three Mullets Gules. The coat of arms of Châtelat is an example of canting since the tower is a castle (French: château). The threes stars represent the three parts of the municipality, le Châtelat, le Fornet and Moron.

== Demographics ==
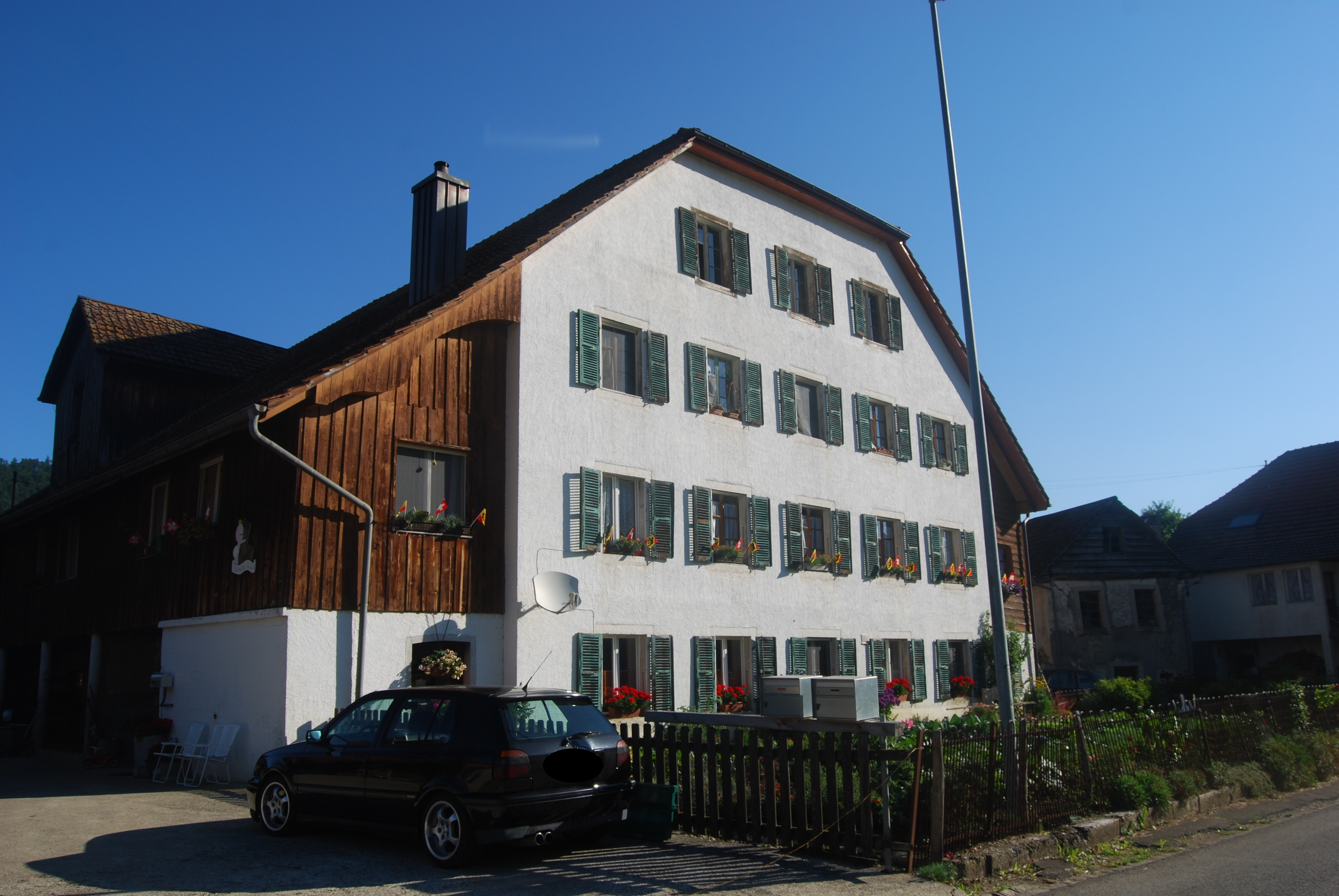
A house in Châtelat village

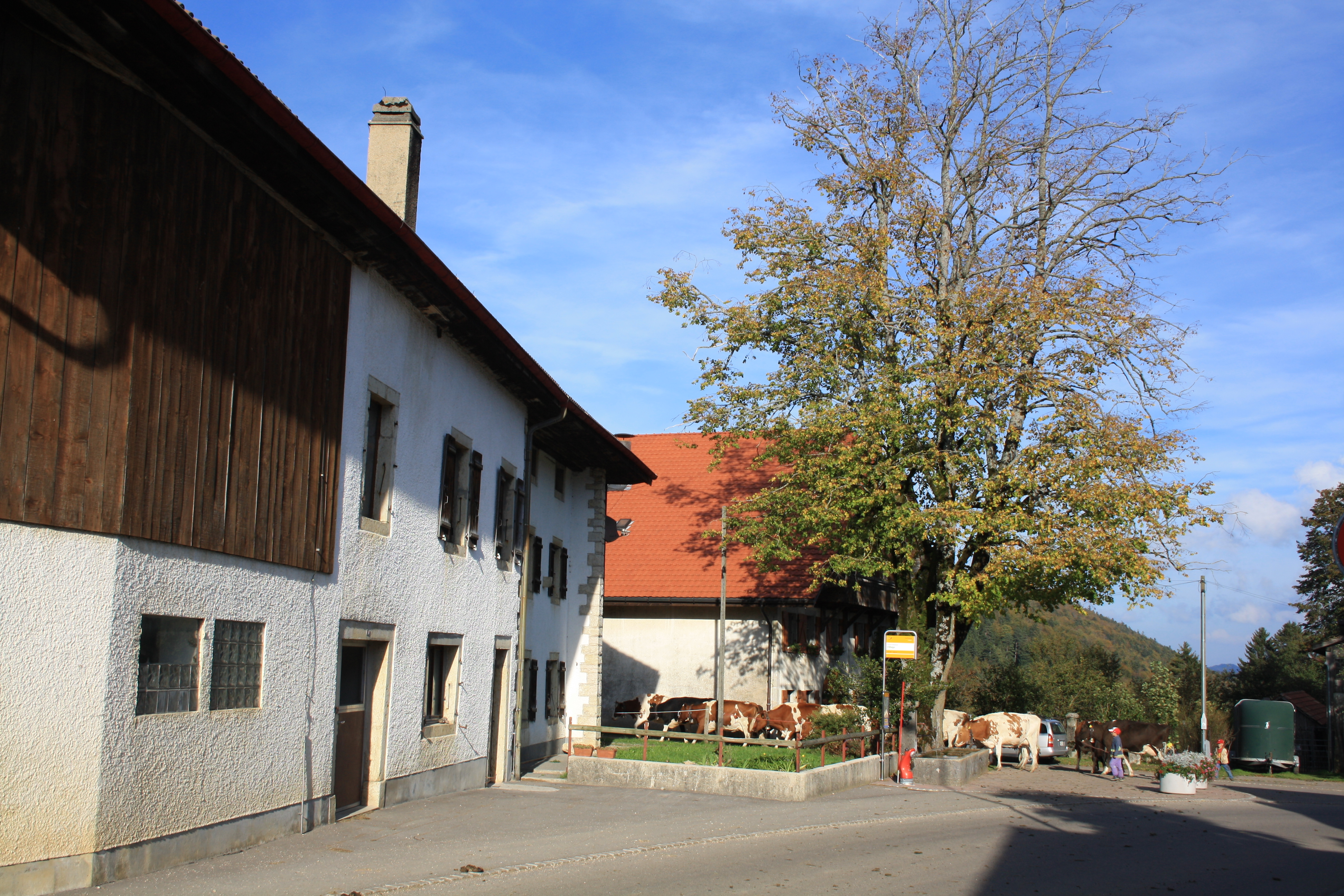
Farm houses in Fornet-Dessous.

Châtelat had a population (as of 2013) of 105. As of 2010, 2.7% of the population are resident foreign nationals. Over the last 10 years (2001-2011) the population has changed at a rate of 0%. Migration accounted for -3.6%, while births and deaths accounted for 0%.

Most of the population (as of 2000) speaks German (78 or 63.9%) as their first language with the rest speaking French.

As of 2008, the population was 50.5% male and 49.5% female. The population was made up of 55 Swiss men (49.5% of the population) and 1 (0.9%) non-Swiss men. There were 53 Swiss women (47.7%) and 2 (1.8%) non-Swiss women. Of the population in the municipality, 71 or about 58.2% were born in Châtelat and lived there in 2000. There were 31 or 25.4% who were born in the same canton, while 14 or 11.5% were born somewhere else in Switzerland, and 3 or 2.5% were born outside of Switzerland.

As of 2011, children and teenagers (0–19 years old) make up 27% of the population, while adults (20–64 years old) make up 49.5% and seniors (over 64 years old) make up 23.4%.

As of 2000, there were 52 people who were single and never married in the municipality. There were 65 married individuals, 5 widows or widowers and individuals who are divorced.

As of 2010, there were 9 households that consist of only one person and 6 households with five or more people. In 2000, a total of 39 apartments (84.8% of the total) were permanently occupied, while 5 apartments (10.9%) were seasonally occupied and 2 apartments (4.3%) were empty. The vacancy rate for the municipality, in 2012, was 2%.

The historical population is given in the following chart:

== Sights ==
The entire village of Châtelat is designated as part of the Inventory of Swiss Heritage Sites.

== Politics ==
In the 2011 federal election the most popular party was the Swiss People's Party (SVP) which received 46.2% of the vote. The next three most popular parties were the Evangelical People's Party (EVP) (22%), the Christian Social Party (CSP) (22%) and the Conservative Democratic Party (BDP) (11.4%). In the federal election, a total of 48 votes were cast, and the voter turnout was 53.9%.

== Economy ==
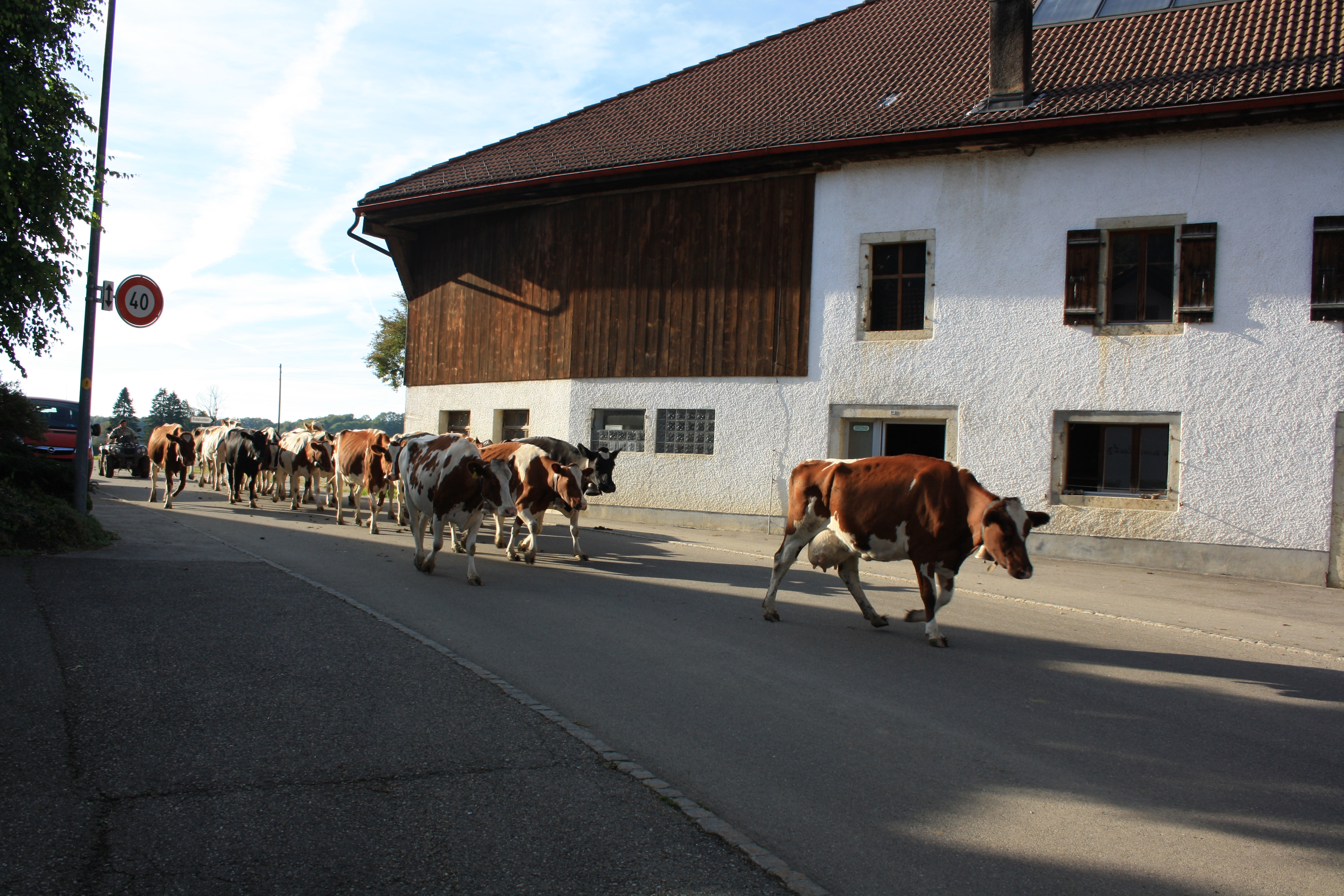
Herding cattle through Fornet-Dessous village. The majority of jobs in the municipality are in agriculture.

As of 2011, Châtelat had an unemployment rate of 0.49%. As of 2008, there were a total of 61 people employed in the municipality. Of these, there were 40 people employed in the primary economic sector and about 16 businesses involved in this sector. 15 people were employed in the secondary sector and there was 1 business in this sector. 6 people were employed in the tertiary sector, with 2 businesses in this sector. There were 68 residents of the municipality who were employed in some capacity, of which females made up 36.8% of the workforce.

In 2008 there were a total of 44 full-time equivalent jobs. The number of jobs in the primary sector was 28, all of which were in agriculture. The number of jobs in the secondary sector was 12, all of which were in manufacturing. The number of jobs in the tertiary sector was 4. In the tertiary sector; 2 were technical professionals or scientists and 2 were in education.

In 2000, there were 7 workers who commuted into the municipality and 19 workers who commuted away. The municipality is a net exporter of workers, with about 2.7 workers leaving the municipality for every one entering. A total of 49 workers (87.5% of the 56 total workers in the municipality) both lived and worked in Châtelat.

In 2011 the average local and cantonal tax rate on a married resident of Châtelat making 150,000 CHF was 13%, while an unmarried resident's rate was 19.1%. For comparison, the average rate for the entire canton in 2006 was 13.9% and the nationwide rate was 11.6%. In 2009 there were a total of 37 tax payers in the municipality. Of that total, 8 made over 75,000 CHF per year. The greatest number of workers, 10, made between 20 and 30 thousand CHF per year. The average income of the over 75,000 CHF group in Châtelat was 87,463 CHF, while the average across all of Switzerland was 130,478 CHF.

== Religion ==
From the 2000 census, 29 or 23.8% belonged to the Swiss Reformed Church, while 4 or 3.3% were Roman Catholic. Of the rest of the population, there were 75 individuals (or about 61.48% of the population) who belonged to another Christian church. 6 (or about 4.92% of the population) belonged to no church, are agnostic or atheist, and 8 individuals (or about 6.56% of the population) did not answer the question.

== Education ==
In Châtelat about 47.7% of the population have completed non-mandatory upper secondary education, and 12.3% have completed additional higher education (either university or a Fachhochschule). Of the 9 who had completed some form of tertiary schooling listed in the census, 44.4% were Swiss men, 55.6% were Swiss women.

The Canton of Bern school system provides one year of non-obligatory Kindergarten, followed by six years of Primary school. This is followed by three years of obligatory lower Secondary school where the students are separated according to ability and aptitude. Following the lower Secondary students may attend additional schooling or they may enter an apprenticeship.

During the 2011-12 school year, there were a total of 20 students attending classes in Châtelat. There were no kindergarten classes and one primary class with 20 students.

As of 2000, there were a total of 9 students attending any school in the municipality. Of those, 2 both lived and attended school in the municipality, while 7 students came from another municipality. During the same year, 14 residents attended schools outside the municipality.
