= Souboz =

- Former municipality
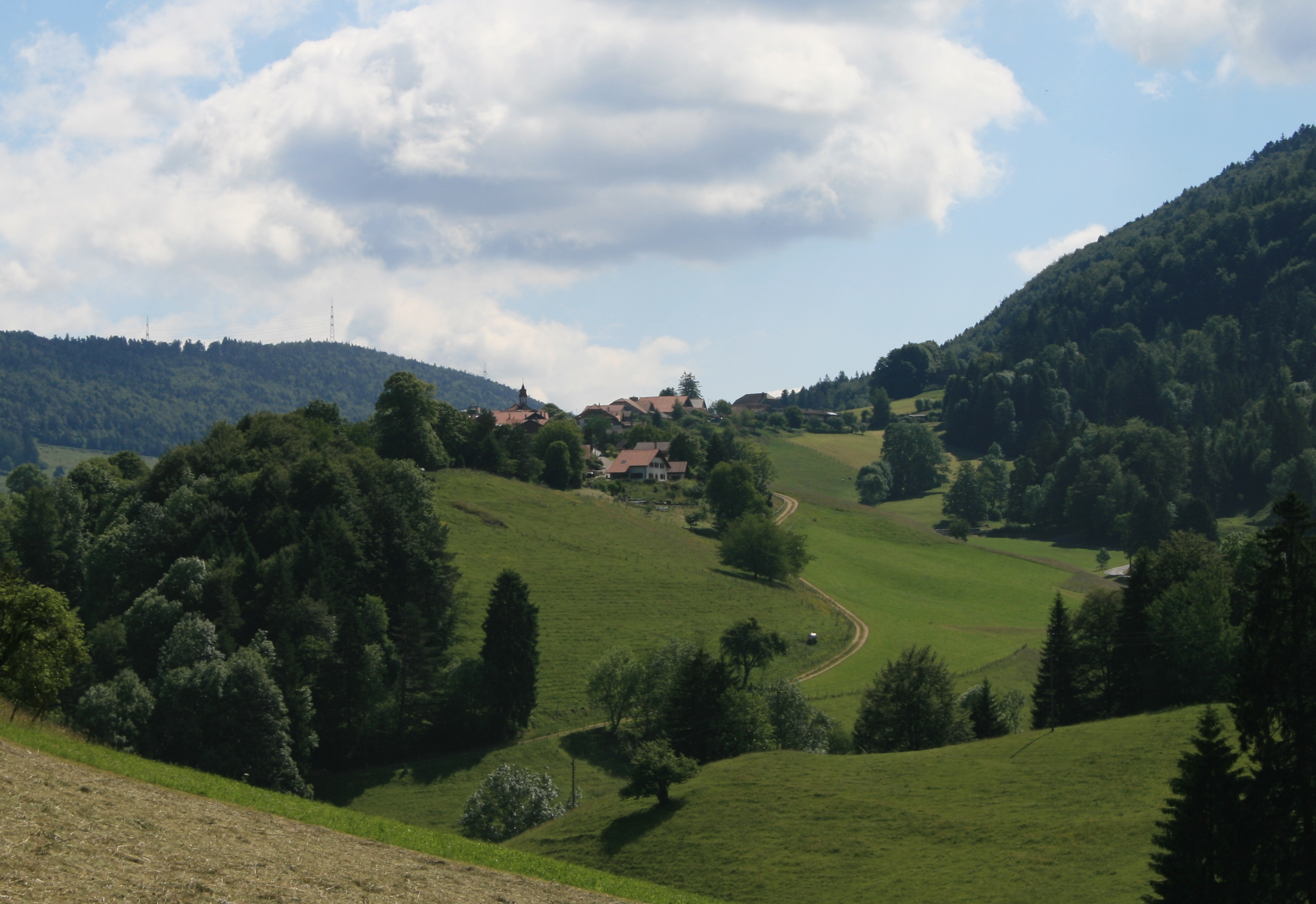
- Souboz village

- Flag Coat of arms
- Location of Souboz
- Location within Switzerland Location within Canton of Bern
- Coordinates: 47°17′N 7°15′E
- Country: Switzerland
- Canton: Bern
- District: Jura bernois

Government
  - Mayor: Maire

Area
  - Total: 10.63 km^{2} (4.10 sq mi)
- Elevation: 875 m (2,871 ft)

Population (Dec 2011)
  - Total: 134
  - Density: 12.6/km^{2} (32.6/sq mi)
- Time zone: UTC+01:00 (CET)
  - Summer (DST): UTC+02:00 (CEST)
- Postal code: 2748
- SFOS number: 712
- ISO 3166 code: CH-BE
- Surrounded by: Sornetan, Saules, Loveresse, Pontenet, Malleray, Champoz, Moutier, Soulce, Undervelier
- Website: www.petit-val.ch

Souboz was a municipality in the Jura bernois administrative district in the canton of Bern in Switzerland. It is located in the French-speaking Bernese Jura (Jura Bernois). On 1 January 2015 the former municipalities of Châtelat, Monible, Sornetan and Souboz merged to form the new municipality of Petit-Val.

== History ==
Souboz is first mentioned in 1398 as Subol.

For most of Souboz's history, it was owned by the college of canons of Moutier-Grandval Abbey under the Prince-Bishop of Basel. During the Protestant Reformation, the village accepted the new faith and became part of the parish of Moutier. After the 1797 French victory and the Treaty of Campo Formio, Souboz became part of the French Département of Mont-Terrible. Three years later, in 1800 it became part of the Département of Haut-Rhin. After Napoleon's defeat and the Congress of Vienna, Souboz was assigned to the Canton of Bern in 1815. In the early 20th century, the municipality was close to bankruptcy and from 1926 until 1937 the mayor of Moutier took over running Souboz to get it out of debt. Today the municipality is mostly agrarian, with about 80% of the local jobs in agriculture.

== Geography ==
Before the merger, Souboz had a total area of 10.6 km^{2} (4.1 mi^{2}). As of 2012, a total of 4.08 km^{2} (1.58 mi^{2}) or 38.2% is used for agricultural purposes, while 6.28 km^{2} (2.42 mi^{2}) or 58.9% is forested. Of the rest of the land, 0.19 km^{2} (0.073 mi^{2}) or 1.8% is settled (buildings or roads), 0.02 km^{2} (4.9 acres) or 0.2% is either rivers or lakes and 0.02 km^{2} (4.9 acres) or 0.2% is unproductive land.

During the same year, housing and buildings made up 0.4% and transportation infrastructure made up 1.1%. Out of the forested land, 56.7% of the total land area is heavily forested and 2.2% is covered with orchards or small clusters of trees. Of the agricultural land, 3.2% is used for growing crops and 17.7% is pastures and 17.2% is used for alpine pastures. All the water in the municipality is flowing water.

On 31 December 2009 District de Moutier, the municipality's former district, was dissolved. On the following day, 1 January 2010, it joined the newly created Arrondissement administratif Jura bernois.

== Coat of arms ==
The blazon of the municipal coat of arms is Or a Bull Gules passant in front of a Tree Vert issuant from a Base of the same.

== Demographics ==
Souboz had a population (as of 2013) of 131. As of 2010, 9.8% of the population are resident foreign nationals. Over the last 10 years (2001-2011) the population has changed at a rate of 1.5%. Migration accounted for 0%, while births and deaths accounted for 1.5%.

Most of the population (as of 2000) speaks French (84 or 73.0%) as their first language, German is the second most common (30 or 26.1%) and Portuguese is the third (1 or 0.9%).

As of 2008, the population was 55.3% male and 44.7% female. The population was made up of 67 Swiss men (50.8% of the population) and 6 (4.5%) non-Swiss men. There were 52 Swiss women (39.4%) and 7 (5.3%) non-Swiss women. Of the population in the municipality, 41 or about 35.7% were born in Souboz and lived there in 2000. There were 40 or 34.8% who were born in the same canton, while 30 or 26.1% were born somewhere else in Switzerland, and 3 or 2.6% were born outside of Switzerland.

As of 2011, children and teenagers (0–19 years old) make up 27.6% of the population, while adults (20–64 years old) make up 55.2% and seniors (over 64 years old) make up 17.2%.

As of 2000, there were 47 people who were single and never married in the municipality. There were 56 married individuals, 11 widows or widowers and 1 individuals who are divorced.

As of 2010, there were 7 households that consist of only one person and 5 households with five or more people. In 2000, a total of 47 apartments (74.6% of the total) were permanently occupied, while 12 apartments (19.0%) were seasonally occupied and 4 apartments (6.3%) were empty. In 2011, single family homes made up 50.0% of the total housing in the municipality.

The historical population is given in the following chart:

== Sights ==
The entire village of Souboz is designated as part of the Inventory of Swiss Heritage Sites.

== Politics ==
In the 2011 federal election the most popular party was the Swiss People's Party (SVP) which received 50.7% of the vote. The next three most popular parties were the Social Democratic Party (SP) (23.7%), the Green Party (11.9%) and the Conservative Democratic Party (BDP) (3.7%). In the federal election, a total of 59 votes were cast, and the voter turnout was 67.8%.

== Economy ==
As of 2011, Souboz had an unemployment rate of 0.37%. As of 2008, there were a total of 33 people employed in the municipality. Of these, there were 27 people employed in the primary economic sector and about 11 businesses involved in this sector. No one was employed in the secondary sector. 6 people were employed in the tertiary sector, with 3 businesses in this sector. There were 68 residents of the municipality who were employed in some capacity, of which females made up 44.1% of the workforce.

In 2008 there were a total of 25 full-time equivalent jobs. The number of jobs in the primary sector was 21, of which 20 were in agriculture and 1 was in forestry or lumber production. There were no jobs in the secondary sector. Of the 4 jobs in the tertiary sector, 1 was in a hotel or restaurant, 1 was in the information industry and 2 were in education.

In 2000, there were 5 workers who commuted into the municipality and 38 workers who commuted away. The municipality is a net exporter of workers, with about 7.6 workers leaving the municipality for every one entering. A total of 30 workers (85.7% of the 35 total workers in the municipality) both lived and worked in Souboz. Of the working population, 13.2% used public transportation to get to work, and 45.6% used a private car.

In 2011 the average local and cantonal tax rate on a married resident, with two children, of Souboz making 150,000 CHF was 12.9%, while an unmarried resident's rate was 18.9%. For comparison, the rate for the entire canton in the same year, was 14.2% and 22.0%, while the nationwide rate was 12.3% and 21.1% respectively. In 2009 there were a total of 44 tax payers in the municipality. Of that total, 14 made over 75,000 CHF per year. The average income of the over 75,000 CHF group in Souboz was 104,293 CHF, while the average across all of Switzerland was 130,478 CHF.

== Religion ==
From the 2000 census, 67 or 58.3% belonged to the Swiss Reformed Church, while 15 or 13.0% were Roman Catholic. Of the rest of the population, there were 25 individuals (or about 21.74% of the population) who belonged to another Christian church. 5 (or about 4.35% of the population) belonged to no church, are agnostic or atheist, and 3 individuals (or about 2.61% of the population) did not answer the question.

== Education ==
In Souboz about 48.5% of the population have completed non-mandatory upper secondary education, and 12.1% have completed additional higher education (either university or a Fachhochschule). Of the 9 who had completed some form of tertiary schooling listed in the census, 77.8% were Swiss men, 22.2% were Swiss women.

The Canton of Bern school system provides one year of non-obligatory Kindergarten, followed by six years of Primary school. This is followed by three years of obligatory lower Secondary school where the students are separated according to ability and aptitude. Following the lower Secondary students may attend additional schooling or they may enter an apprenticeship.

During the 2011-12 school year, there were a total of 11 students attending one primary school class in Souboz.

As of 2000, there were a total of 16 students attending any school in the municipality. Of those, 12 both lived and attended school in the municipality, while 4 students came from another municipality. During the same year, 3 residents attended schools outside the municipality.
