= Monible =

- Former municipality
- Flag Coat of arms
- Location of Monible
- Location within Switzerland Location within Canton of Bern
- Coordinates: 47°17′N 7°12′E
- Country: Switzerland
- Canton: Bern
- District: Jura bernois

Area
  - Total: 3.39 km^{2} (1.31 sq mi)
- Elevation: 862 m (2,828 ft)

Population (Dec 2011)
  - Total: 37
  - Density: 11/km^{2} (28/sq mi)
- Time zone: UTC+01:00 (CET)
  - Summer (DST): UTC+02:00 (CEST)
- Postal code: 2715
- SFOS number: 699
- ISO 3166 code: CH-BE
- Surrounded by: Rebévelier, Châtelat, Sornetan, Undervelier
- Website: www.petit-val.ch

Monible is a former municipality in the Jura bernois administrative district in the canton of Bern in Switzerland. It is located in the French-speaking Bernese Jura (Jura Bernois). On 1 January 2015 the former municipalities of Châtelat, Monible, Sornetan and Souboz merged to form the new municipality of Petit-Val.

== History ==
Monible is first mentioned in 1403 as Montnible, though this comes from document that was written in 1414. In 1537 it was mentioned as Monible.

For much of its history, Monible was part of the Amt or township of Sornetan under the provost of Moutier-Grandval Abbey who was under the Prince-Bishop of Basel. Most of the village was destroyed by a fire in 1743. After the 1798 French invasion, Monible became part of the French Département of Mont-Terrible. Three years later, in 1800 it became part of the Département of Haut-Rhin. After Napoleon's defeat and the Congress of Vienna, Monible was assigned to the Canton of Bern in 1815.

The village's population has been steadily declining since the 19th century. In 1956 the municipal primary school closed and today only a kindergarten is open.

== Geography ==
Before the merger, Monible had a total area of 3.4 km^{2} (1.3 mi^{2}). As of 2012, a total of 1.65 km^{2} (0.64 mi^{2}) or 48.7% is used for agricultural purposes, while 1.62 km^{2} (0.63 mi^{2}) or 47.8% is forested. Of the rest of the land, 0.05 km^{2} (12 acres) or 1.5% is settled (buildings or roads) and 0.03 km^{2} (7.4 acres) or 0.9% is unproductive land.

During the same year, housing and buildings made up 0.6% and transportation infrastructure made up 0.9%. Out of the forested land, 43.4% of the total land area is heavily forested and 4.4% is covered with orchards or small clusters of trees. Of the agricultural land, 36.0% is pastures and 11.2% is used for alpine pastures.

Monible is a small hamlet located on a hill near the Sornetan.

On 31 December 2009 District de Moutier, the municipality's former district, was dissolved. On the following day, 1 January 2010, it joined the newly created Arrondissement administratif Jura bernois.

== Coat of arms ==
The blazon of the municipal coat of arms is Argent a Pigeon Azure holding in beak a Horse-Shue Gules on a Mount Vert.

== Demographics ==
Monible had a population (as of 2013) of 36. Over the last 10 years (2001-2011) the population has changed at a rate of -14%. Migration accounted for -16.3%, while births and deaths accounted for 2.3%.

Most of the population (as of 2000) speaks French (31 or 88.6%) as their first language with the rest speaking German.

As of 2008, the population was 53.5% male and 46.5% female. The population was made up of 22 Swiss men (51.2% of the population) and 1 (2.3%) non-Swiss men. There were 20 Swiss women (46.5%) and (0.0%) non-Swiss women. Of the population in the municipality, 12 or about 34.3% were born in Monible and lived there in 2000. There were 16 or 45.7% who were born in the same canton, while 7 or 20.0% were born somewhere else in Switzerland.

As of 2011, children and teenagers (0–19 years old) make up 27% of the population, while adults (20–64 years old) make up 56.8% and seniors (over 64 years old) make up 16.2%.

As of 2000, there were 13 people who were single and never married in the municipality. There were 20 married individuals, 1 widow or widower and 1 individual who was divorced.

As of 2010, there were 3 households that consist of only one person and 2 households with five or more people. In 2000, a total of 15 apartments (83.3% of the total) were permanently occupied, while 3 apartments (16.7%) were seasonally occupied. The vacancy rate for the municipality, in 2012, was 4.76%. In 2011, single family homes made up 52.6% of the total housing in the municipality.

The historical population is given in the following chart:

== Heritage sites of national significance ==
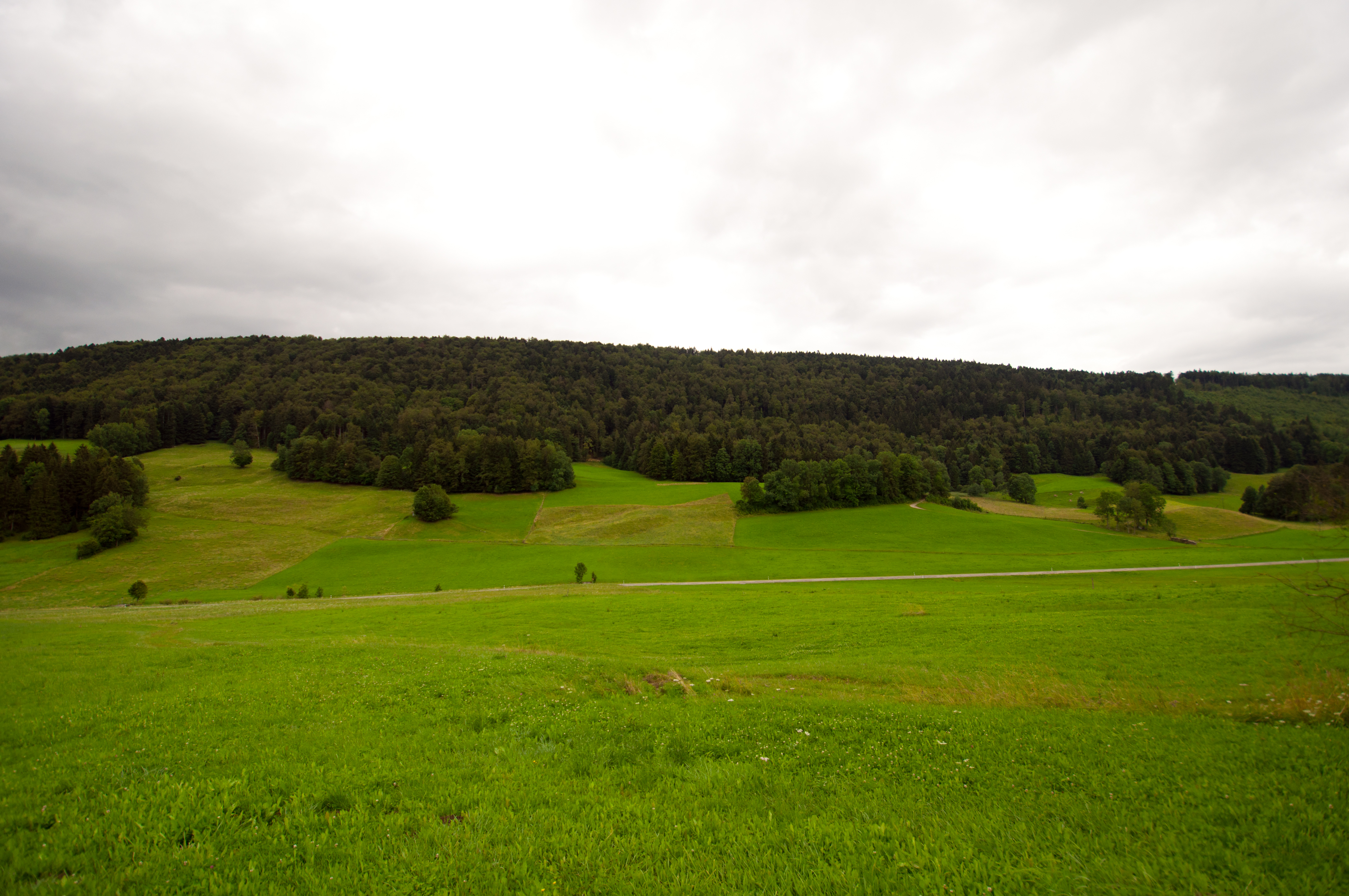
The site of the Forêts du Beucle mine

The Forêts du Beucle, a medieval iron mine, is listed as a Swiss heritage site of national significance.

== Politics ==
In the 2011 federal election the most popular party was another local party which received 36.4% of the vote. The next three most popular parties were the Swiss People's Party (SVP) (27.3%), the Green Party (18.2%) and the Conservative Democratic Party (BDP) (7.7%). In the federal election, a total of 19 votes were cast, and the voter turnout was 65.5%.

== Economy ==
As of 2011, Monible had an unemployment rate of 0.96%. As of 2008, there were a total of 15 people employed in the municipality. Of these, there were 13 people employed in the primary economic sector and about 3 businesses involved in this sector. No one was employed in the secondary sector. 2 people were employed in the tertiary sector, with 2 businesses in this sector. There were 25 residents of the municipality who were employed in some capacity, of which females made up 32.0% of the workforce.

In 2008 there were a total of 10 full-time equivalent jobs. The number of jobs in the primary sector was 8, all of which were in agriculture. There were no jobs in the secondary sector. That left two jobs in the tertiary sector, one was in wholesale or retail sales or the repair of motor vehicles and one was in the information industry.

In 2000, there were 3 workers who commuted into the municipality and 13 workers who commuted away. The municipality is a net exporter of workers, with about 4.3 workers leaving the municipality for every one entering. A total of 12 workers (80.0% of the 15 total workers in the municipality) both lived and worked in Monible. Of the working population, 4% used public transportation to get to work, and 52% used a private car.

In 2011 the average local and cantonal tax rate on a married resident, with two children, of Monible making 150,000 CHF was 13%, while an unmarried resident's rate was 19.1%. For comparison, the rate for the entire canton in the same year, was 14.2% and 22.0%, while the nationwide rate was 12.3% and 21.1% respectively. In 2009 there were a total of 18 tax payers in the municipality. Of that total, 6 made over 75,000 CHF per year. There was one person who made between 15,000 and 20,000 per year. The greatest number of workers, 7, made between 50,000 and 75,000 CHF per year. The average income of the over 75,000 CHF group in Monible was 84,650 CHF, while the average across all of Switzerland was 130,478 CHF.

== Religion ==
From the 2000 census, 31 or 88.6% belonged to the Swiss Reformed Church, while 3 or 8.6% were Roman Catholic. 1 belonged to no church, was agnostic or atheist.

== Education ==
In Monible about 44.4% of the population have completed non-mandatory upper secondary education, and 18.5% have completed additional higher education (either university or a Fachhochschule). Of the 5 who had completed some form of tertiary schooling listed in the census, 80.0% were Swiss men, 20.0% were Swiss women.

The Canton of Bern school system provides one year of non-obligatory Kindergarten, followed by six years of Primary school. This is followed by three years of obligatory lower Secondary school where the students are separated according to ability and aptitude. Following the lower Secondary students may attend additional schooling or they may enter an apprenticeship.

During the 2011-12 school year, there were a total of 15 students attending classes in Monible. There was one kindergarten class with a total of 15 students in the municipality. Of the kindergarten students, 13.3% have a different mother language than the classroom language.

As of 2000, there were a total of 6 students attending any school in the municipality. All 6 of the students came from another municipality. During the same year, one resident attended school outside the municipality.
