= Saicourt =

- Municipality
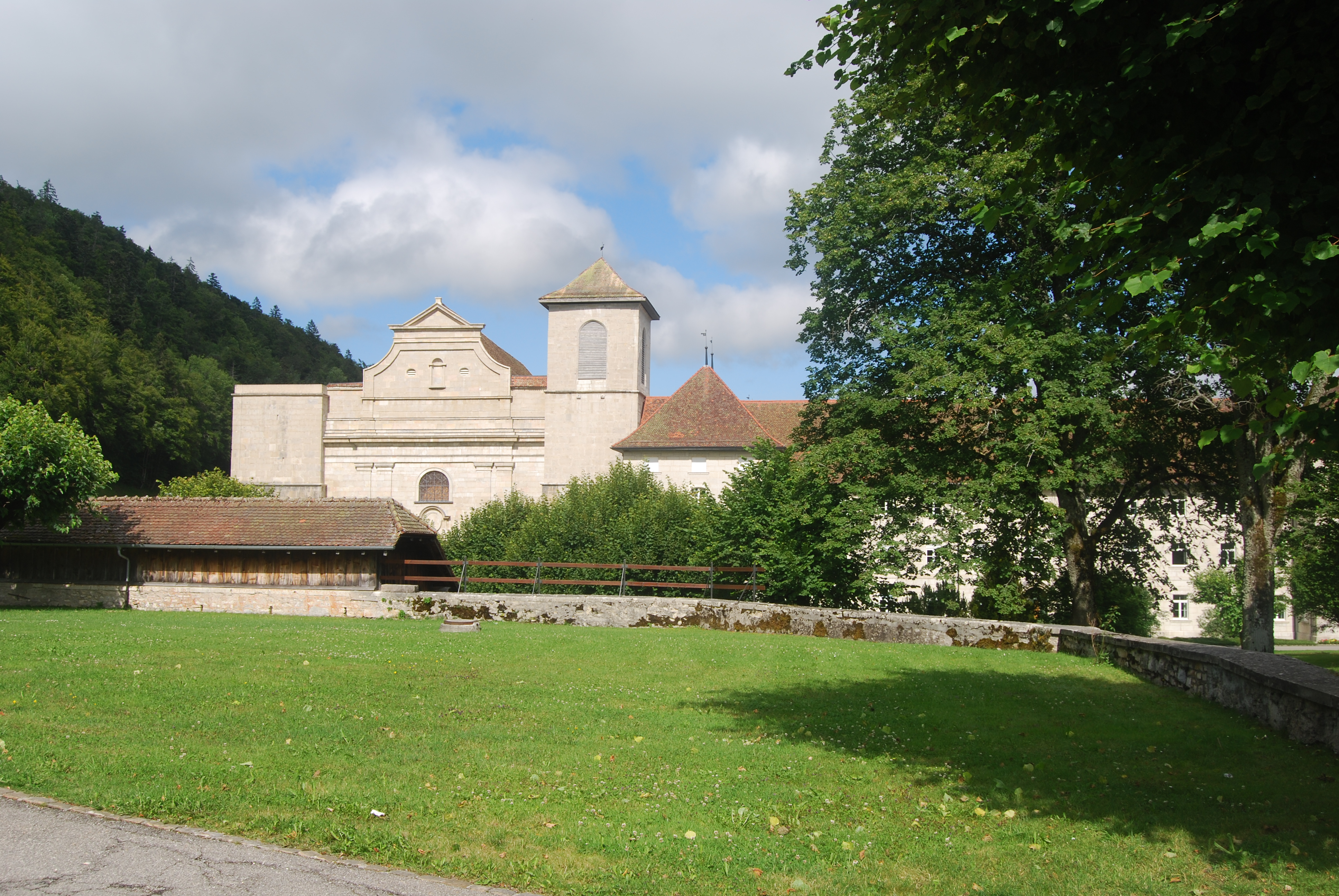
- The church of the former Bellelay Abbey in Saicourt municipality

- Flag Coat of arms
- Location of Saicourt
- Location within Switzerland Location within Canton of Bern
- Coordinates: 47°15′N 7°12′E
- Country: Switzerland
- Canton: Bern
- District: Jura bernois

Government
  - Mayor: Maire; Markus Gerber

Area
  - Total: 13.75 km^{2} (5.31 sq mi)
- Elevation: 749 m (2,457 ft)

Population (Dec 2011)
  - Total: 603
  - Density: 43.9/km^{2} (114/sq mi)
- Time zone: UTC+01:00 (CET)
  - Summer (DST): UTC+02:00 (CEST)
- Postal code: 2732
- SFOS number: 706
- ISO 3166 code: CH-BE
- Localities: 2712 Le Fuet, 2713 Bellelay, La Bottiere, Montbautier
- Surrounded by: Tramelan, Mont-Tramelan, Tavannes, Reconvilier, Saules, Sornetan, Châtelat, Lajoux, Les Genevez
- Website: www.saicourt.ch

Saicourt (Frainc-Comtou: Saîcouét [sɛː.ˈku]; Arpitan: Sacort [sa.ˈku]) is a municipality in the Jura bernois administrative district in the canton of Bern in Switzerland. It comprises the localities of Le Fuet, Bellelay, La Bottiere and Montbautier. It is located in the French-speaking Bernese Jura (Jura Bernois).

== History ==
Saicourt is first mentioned in 1262 as Zacurt.

Bellelay Abbey was established in the nearby Bellelay valley in 1140. The Abbey owned land and rights in the village of Saicourt for most of its history. However, both Saicourt and Le Fuet belonged to the provost of Moutier-Grandval under the Prince-Bishop of Basel. After the 1798 French invasion, the Abbey was secularized and Saicourt became an independent political municipality. The municipality became part of the French Département of Mont-Terrible. Three years later, in 1800 it became part of the Département of Haut-Rhin. After Napoleon's defeat and the Congress of Vienna, Saicourt was assigned to the Canton of Bern in 1815.

During the 18th century a number of German speaking Anabaptists settled in the village of Montbautier. The villages of Saicourt and La Fuet were part of the parish of Tavannes-Chaindon until 1928. At that time Le Fuet and Bellelay went to the Tavannes parish while Saicourt became part of the Reconvilier parish. A Swiss Reformed chapel was built in Le Fuet in 1938.

During the Middle Ages and into the Early Modern era most of the local economy was based on the production of Tête de Moine cheese at the Abbey. Beginning in the 18th century the watchmaking industry and mining silica sand were added. Peat cutting became common in Bellelay and La Bottière. By the early 20th century watchmaking and sand mining both died out, followed by peat producing in 1945. In 1899 Bellelay Abbey was converted into a psychiatric clinic. It has grown into the largest employer in the municipality. In 2008 a total of 341 people worked in the clinic.

== Geography ==
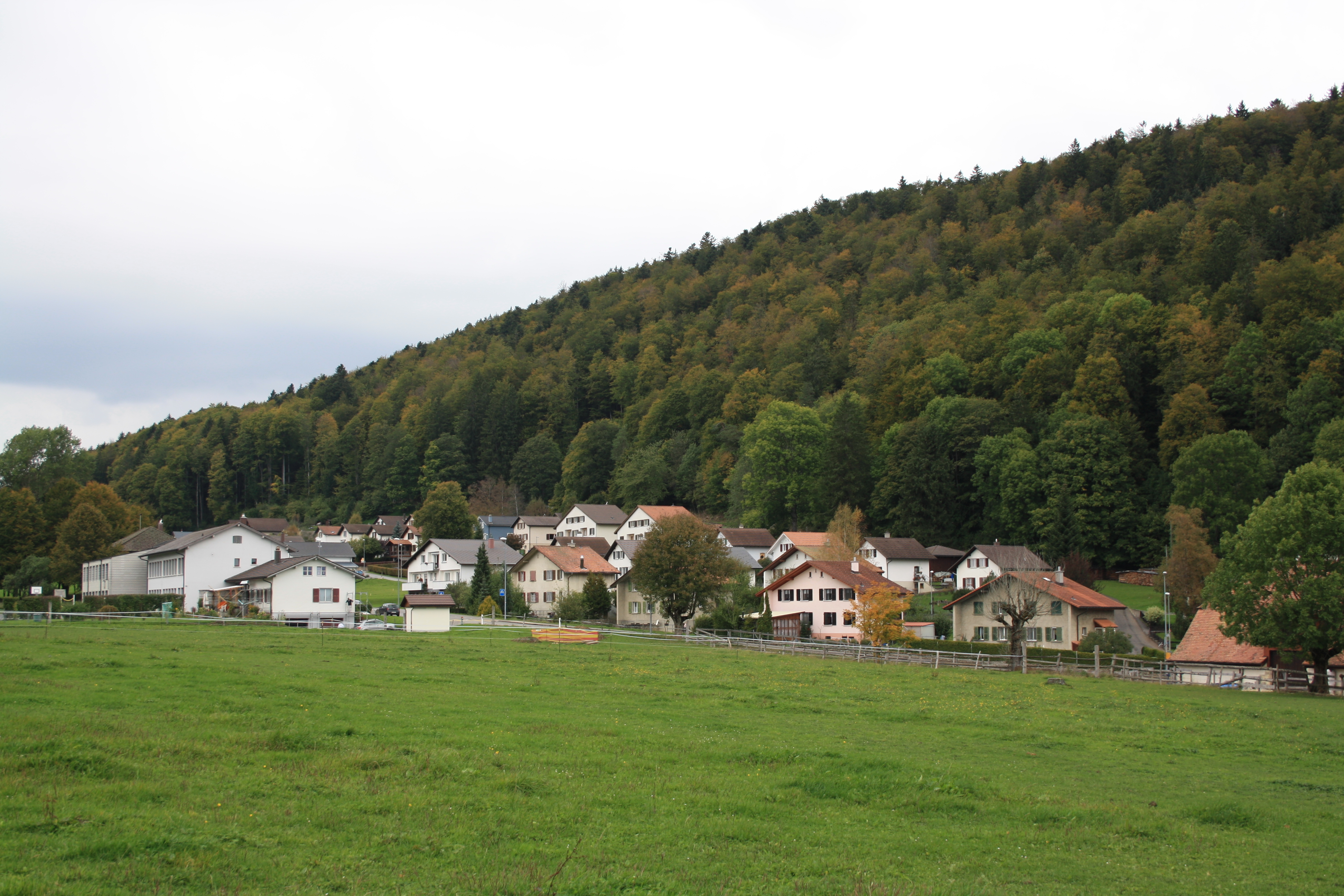
Bellelay village and surrounding hills

Saicourt has an area of 13.77 km^{2} (5.32 sq mi). As of 2012, a total of 6.17 km^{2} (2.38 mi^{2}) or 44.8% is used for agricultural purposes, while 6.89 km^{2} (2.66 mi^{2}) or 50.0% is forested. Of the rest of the land, 0.6 km^{2} (0.23 mi^{2}) or 4.4% is settled (buildings or roads), 0.02 km^{2} (4.9 acres) or 0.1% is either rivers or lakes and 0.12 km^{2} (30 acres) or 0.9% is unproductive land.

During the same year, housing and buildings made up 2.2% and transportation infrastructure made up 1.5%. Out of the forested land, 46.0% of the total land area is heavily forested and 4.0% is covered with orchards or small clusters of trees. Of the agricultural land, 4.1% is used for growing crops and 32.8% is pastures and 7.6% is used for alpine pastures. All the water in the municipality is flowing water.

The municipality is located in the Trame, Le Fuet and Bellelay valleys. It consists of the village of Saicourt and the hamlets of La Bottière and Montbautier.

On 31 December 2009 District de Moutier, the municipality's former district, was dissolved. On the following day, 1 January 2010, it joined the newly created Arrondissement administratif Jura bernois.

== Coat of arms ==
The blazon of the municipal coat of arms is Or on a Pale Gules an Abbot's Crozier of the first issuant from a Mount of 3 Coupeaux vert.

== Demographics ==
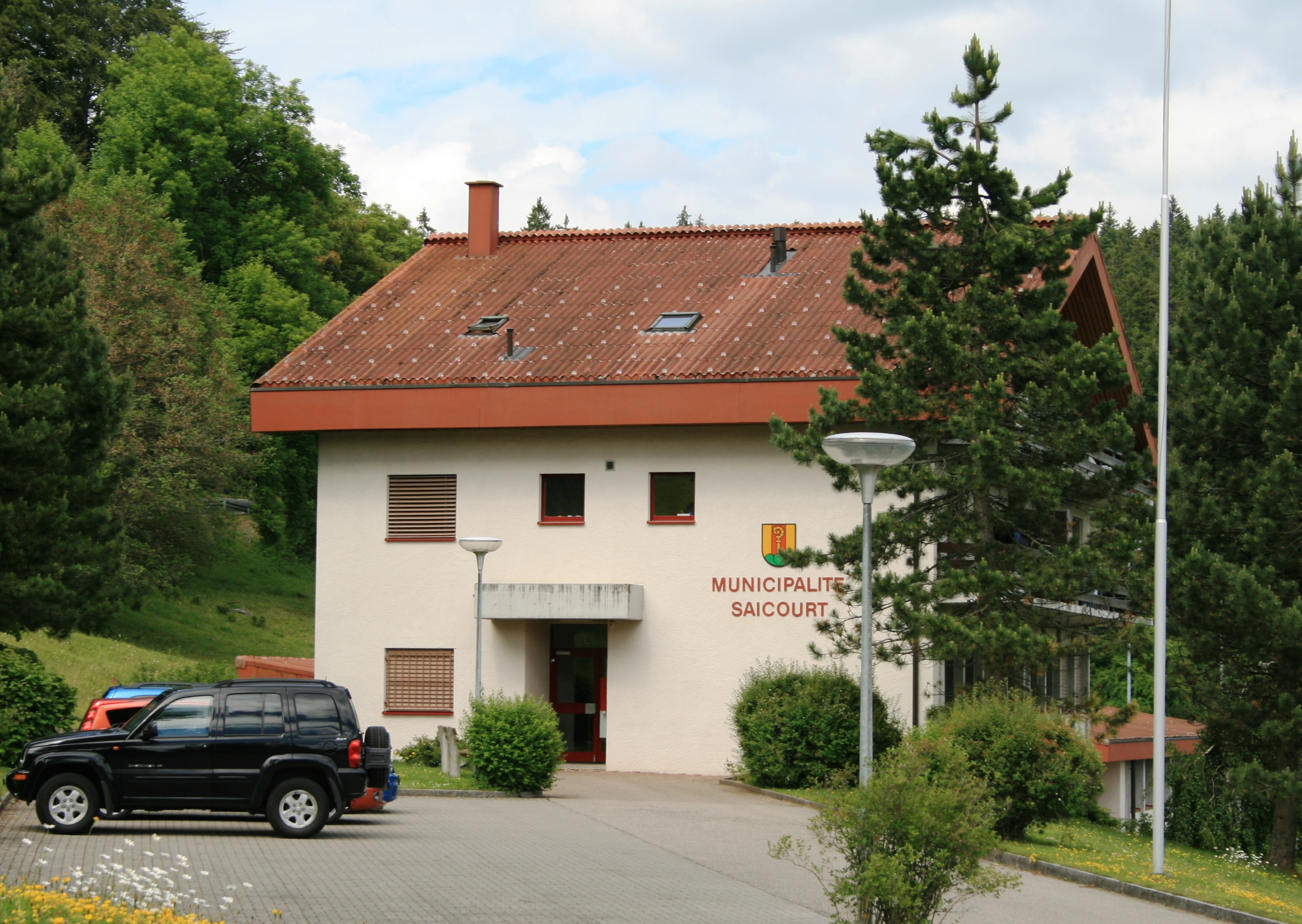
Saicourt municipal administration building

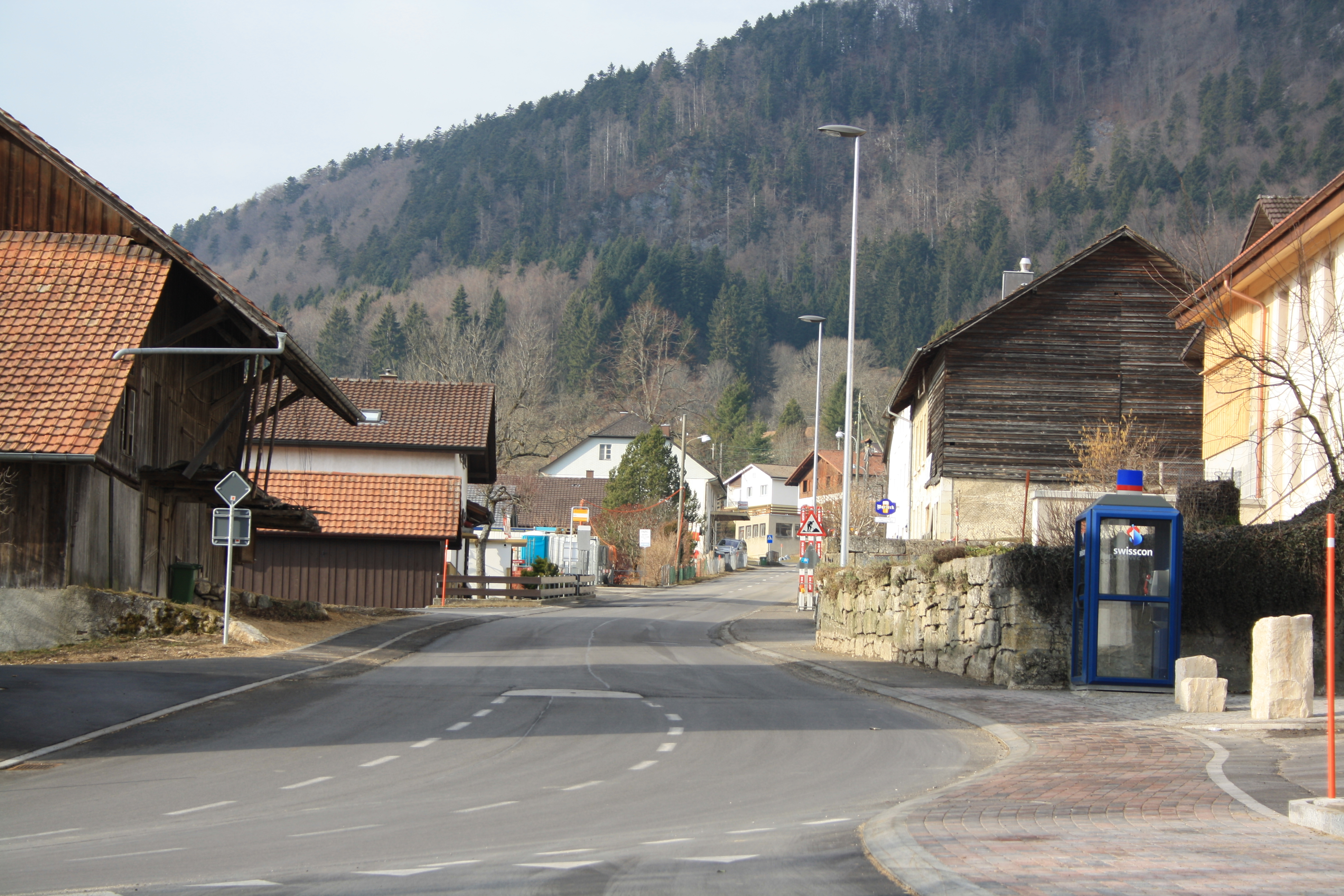
Le Fuet village

Saicourt has a population (as of December 2020) of 645. As of 2010, 3.7% of the population are resident foreign nationals. Over the last 10 years (2001-2011) the population has changed at a rate of 1.7%. Migration accounted for 1.3%, while births and deaths accounted for 0.3%.

Most of the population (as of 2000) speaks French (565 or 84.0%) as their first language, German is the second most common (85 or 12.6%) and Italian is the third (10 or 1.5%).

As of 2008, the population was 51.4% male and 48.6% female. The population was made up of 287 Swiss men (48.4% of the population) and 18 (3.0%) non-Swiss men. There were 284 Swiss women (47.9%) and 4 (0.7%) non-Swiss women. Of the population in the municipality, 219 or about 32.5% were born in Saicourt and lived there in 2000. There were 214 or 31.8% who were born in the same canton, while 102 or 15.2% were born somewhere else in Switzerland, and 53 or 7.9% were born outside of Switzerland.

As of 2011, children and teenagers (0–19 years old) make up 25.5% of the population, while adults (20–64 years old) make up 61.5% and seniors (over 64 years old) make up 12.9%.

As of 2000, there were 318 people who were single and never married in the municipality. There were 289 married individuals, 44 widows or widowers and 22 individuals who are divorced.

As of 2010, there were 80 households that consist of only one person and 21 households with five or more people. In 2000, a total of 225 apartments (78.7% of the total) were permanently occupied, while 42 apartments (14.7%) were seasonally occupied and 19 apartments (6.6%) were empty. The vacancy rate for the municipality, in 2012, was 2.54%. In 2011, single family homes made up 60.2% of the total housing in the municipality.

The historical population is given in the following chart:

== Heritage sites of national significance ==
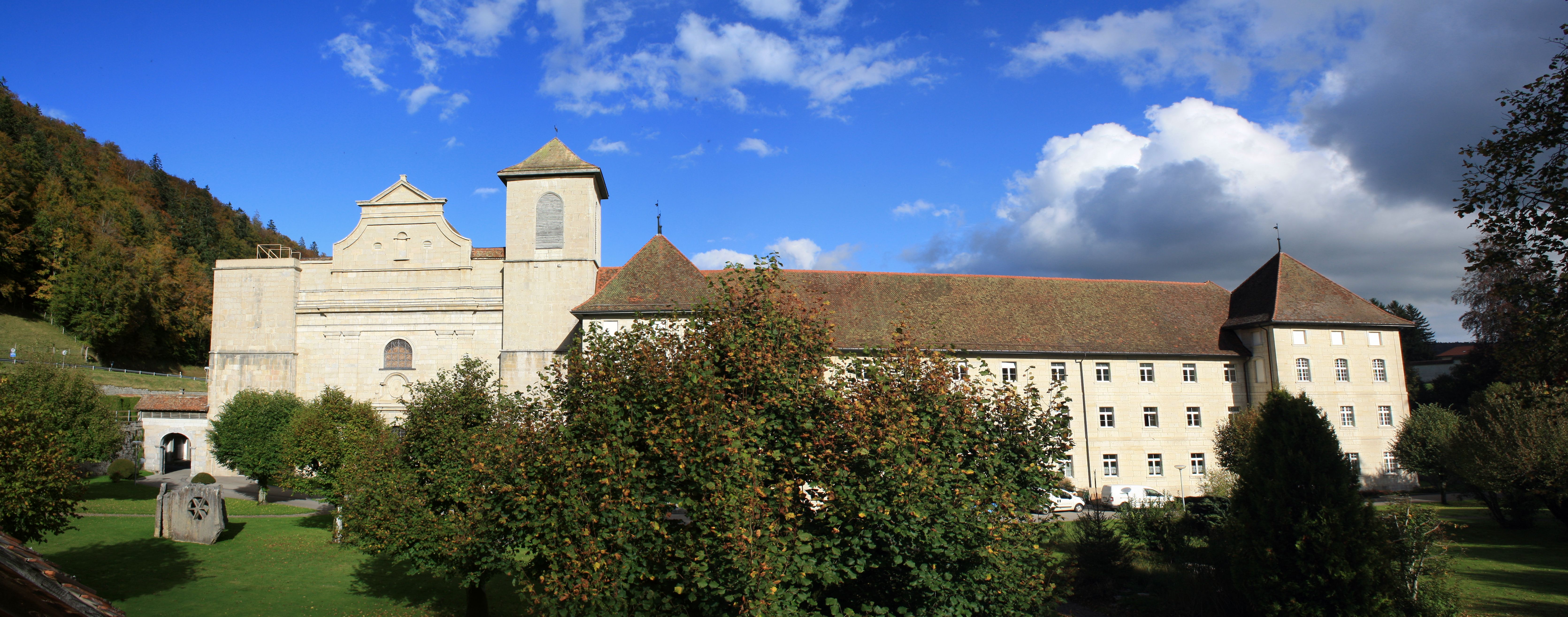
Bellelay Abbey building

The Former Premonstratensian Bellelay Abbey is listed as a Swiss heritage site of national significance. The entire former Abbey complex is part of the Inventory of Swiss Heritage Sites.

== Monuments ==
The Abbey church is the second largest church of the canton. The monks of the abbey invented the famous cheese “Tête de Moine”.

== Hospital ==
The psychiatric clinic of Bellelay is located in Saicourt. It was founded in 1891 when the Canton of Bern acquired Bellelay Abbey and converted it into a clinic.

== Politics ==
In the 2011 federal election the most popular party was the Swiss People's Party (SVP) which received 42.3% of the vote. The next three most popular parties were the Social Democratic Party (SP) (15.3%), the Conservative Democratic Party (BDP) (10.7%) and another local party (8.2%). In the federal election, a total of 184 votes were cast, and the voter turnout was 40.3%.

== Economy ==
As of 2011, Saicourt had an unemployment rate of 1.04%. As of 2008, there were a total of 452 people employed in the municipality. Of these, there were 45 people employed in the primary economic sector and about 19 businesses involved in this sector. 17 people were employed in the secondary sector and there were 4 businesses in this sector. 390 people were employed in the tertiary sector, with 17 businesses in this sector. There were 321 residents of the municipality who were employed in some capacity, of which females made up 45.8% of the workforce.

In 2008 there were a total of 377 full-time equivalent jobs. The number of jobs in the primary sector was 33, all of which were in agriculture. The number of jobs in the secondary sector was 15 of which 3 were in manufacturing and 12 were in construction. The number of jobs in the tertiary sector was 329. In the tertiary sector; 4 or 1.2% were in a hotel or restaurant, 17 or 5.2% were in education and 293 or 89.1% were in health care.

In 2000, there were 229 workers who commuted into the municipality and 167 workers who commuted away. The municipality is a net importer of workers, with about 1.4 workers entering the municipality for every one leaving. A total of 154 workers (40.2% of the 383 total workers in the municipality) both lived and worked in Saicourt. Of the working population, 6.5% used public transportation to get to work, and 59.8% used a private car.

In 2011 the average local and cantonal tax rate on a married resident, with two children, of Saicourt making 150,000 CHF was 13.4%, while an unmarried resident's rate was 19.7%. For comparison, the rate for the entire canton in the same year, was 14.2% and 22.0%, while the nationwide rate was 12.3% and 21.1% respectively. In 2009 there were a total of 247 tax payers in the municipality. Of that total, 70 made over 75,000 CHF per year. There were 2 people who made between 15,000 and 20,000 per year. The greatest number of workers, 78, made between 50,000 and 75,000 CHF per year. The average income of the over 75,000 CHF group in Saicourt was 103,389 CHF, while the average across all of Switzerland was 130,478 CHF.

In 2011 a total of 2.2% of the population received direct financial assistance from the government.

== Religion ==
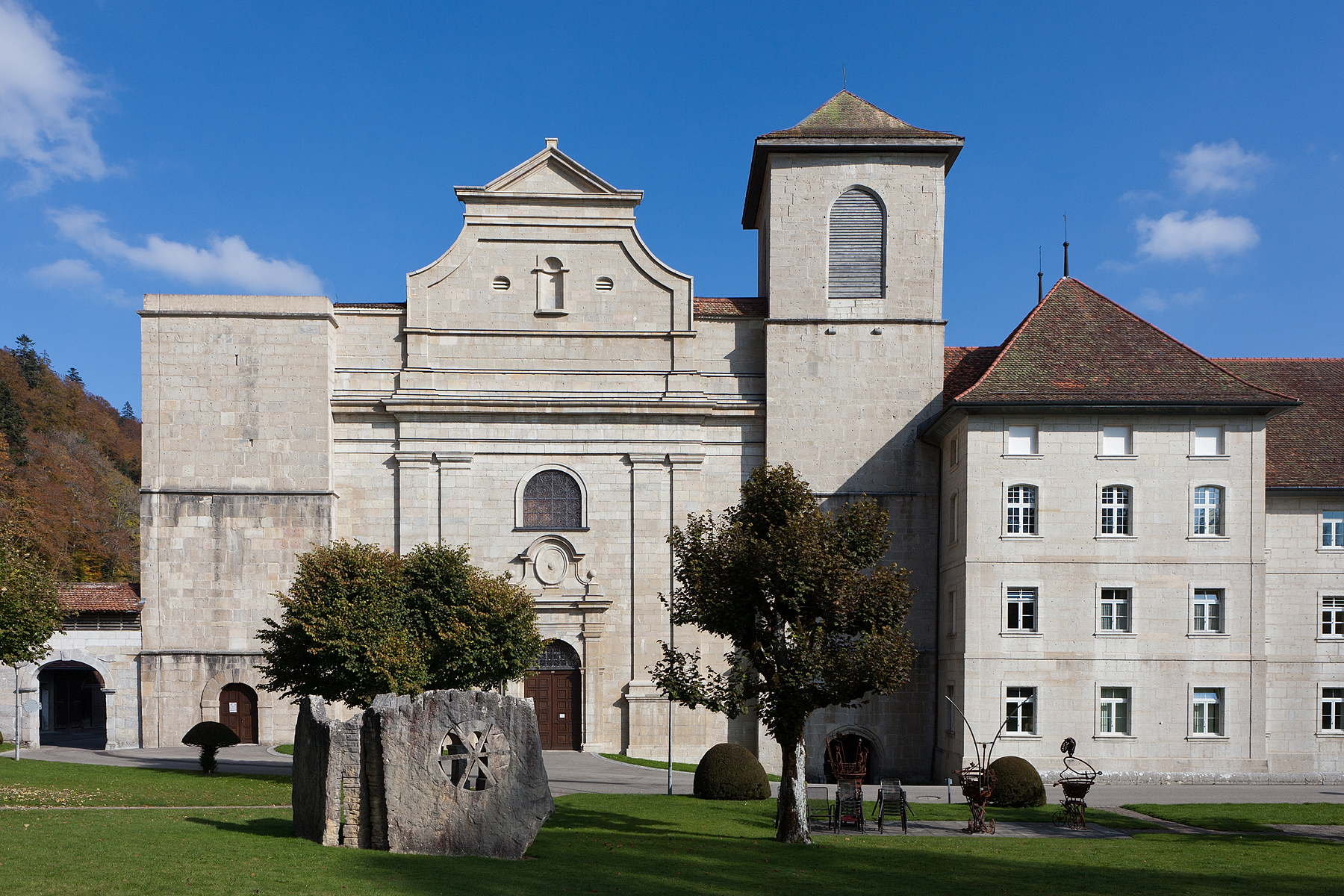
Bellelay Abbey Church

From the 2000 census, 377 or 56.0% belonged to the Swiss Reformed Church, while 132 or 19.6% were Roman Catholic. Of the rest of the population, there were 5 members of an Orthodox church (or about 0.74% of the population), and there were 73 individuals (or about 10.85% of the population) who belonged to another Christian church. There were 7 (or about 1.04% of the population) who were Islamic. There was 1 person who was Buddhist and 2 individuals who belonged to another church. 39 (or about 5.79% of the population) belonged to no church, are agnostic or atheist, and 37 individuals (or about 5.50% of the population) did not answer the question.

== Education ==
In Saicourt about 54.6% of the population have completed non-mandatory upper secondary education, and 12.4% have completed additional higher education (either university or a Fachhochschule). Of the 49 who had completed some form of tertiary schooling listed in the census, 55.1% were Swiss men, 32.7% were Swiss women.

The Canton of Bern school system provides one year of non-obligatory Kindergarten, followed by six years of Primary school. This is followed by three years of obligatory lower Secondary school where the students are separated according to ability and aptitude. Following the lower Secondary students may attend additional schooling or they may enter an apprenticeship.

During the 2011-12 school year, there were a total of 132 students attending classes in Saicourt. There was one kindergarten class with a total of 10 students in the municipality. Of the kindergarten students, 30.0% have a different mother language than the classroom language. The municipality had 2 primary classes and 40 students. Of the primary students, 2.5% were permanent or temporary residents of Switzerland (not citizens) and 17.5% have a different mother language than the classroom language. During the same year, there were 5 lower secondary classes with a total of 82 students. There were 3.7% who were permanent or temporary residents of Switzerland (not citizens) and 17.1% have a different mother language than the classroom language.

As of 2000, there were a total of 144 students attending any school in the municipality. Of those, 88 both lived and attended school in the municipality, while 56 students came from another municipality. During the same year, 16 residents attended schools outside the municipality.
