= Ernricus Pirhing =

German Lawyer

Ernricus Pirhing (born at Sigarthin, near Passau, 1606; died between 1678 and 1681) was a German Jesuit canon lawyer.

== Life ==
At the age of twenty-two he entered the Society of Jesus, where he gave instruction in the Sacred Sciences. He taught canon law and Scripture for twelve years at Dillingen, where he was still living in 1675.

== Works ==
His "Jus canonicum in V libros Decretalium distributum" (5 vols., Dillingen, 1674–77; 4 vols., Dillingen, 1722; 5 vols., Venice, 1759) maintains the classical divisions of the Corpus Juris, but gives too a complete and synthetic explanation of the canonical legislation of the matters which he treats.

He published also, under the form of theses, seven pamphlets on the titles of the first book of the Decretals, which were resumed in his "Jus Canonicum"; and an "Apologia" against two sermons of the Protestant Balduinus (Ingolstadt, 1652; Munich, 1653). After his death, one of his colleagues published a "Synopsis Pirhingana", or résumé of his "Jus Canonicum" (Dillingen, 1695; Venice, 1711).
