= College (Catholic canon law) =

Term in canon law for a corporation

A college, in the canon law of the Roman Catholic Church, is a collection (Latin: collegium) of persons united together for a common object so as to form one body. The members are consequently said to be incorporated, or to form a corporation.

== History ==
Colleges existed among the Romans and Greeks from the earliest times. The Roman laws required at least three persons for constituting a college. Legal incorporation was made, at least in some cases, by decrees of the Senate, edicts of the emperor, or by special laws. There were, however, general laws under which colleges could be formed by private persons, and if the authorities judged that the members had conformed to the letter and spirit of these laws, they had incontestable rights as collegia legitima; if the requisites were not adhered to they could be suppressed by administrative act.

The colleges could hold property in common and could sue and be sued. In case of failure this common property could be seized, but that of the individual members was not liable to seizure. The Roman collegium was never instituted as a corporation sole; still, when reduced to one member, that individual succeeded to all the rights of the corporation and could employ its name.

Colleges were formed among the ancient Romans for various purposes. Some of these had a religious object, as the college of the Arval Brothers, of the Augurs, etc.; others were for administrative purposes, as of quæstors or tribunes of the people; others again were trade unions or guilds, as the colleges of bakers or of carpenters.

The early Roman Christians are said to have sometimes held church property during times of persecution under the title of collegium. (Note: For the evidence of this, see H. Leclercq, Manuel d'Archéolog. Chrét. (Paris, 1907, I, 261-66). It is not admitted by Louis Duchesne, Hist. anc. de l'Eglise (Paris 1906, I).)

== Canon law ==
Most of the prescriptions of the ancient civil law were received into the law of the Roman Catholic Church and they are incorporated in the Corpus Juris Canonici. By canonists, a college has been defined as a collection of several rational bodies forming one representative body. Some authors consider "university" and "community" as synonymous terms with college, but others insist that there are points of difference. Thus, there are canonists who define university as a collection of bodies distinct from one another, but employing the same name specially conferred upon them. Pirhing remarks that a community of priests attached to the same church do not form a college unless they are members of one body whose head is a prelate elected by that body.

According to canon law three persons are required to form a college. Some authors maintained that two were sufficient for the purpose, because Pope Innocent, alluding to St. Matthew, xviii, 20, says that no presbyter is to be chosen for a church where two or three form the congregation, except by their canonical election. As congregation here evidently means college, these writers contend that two can therefore form a college. As a matter of fact, however, the pontiff is simply affirming that the right of election will remain with an already constituted college even though only two of its members remain after the death of the prelate. Pirhing gives as the reason why two cannot constitute a college, that though it be not necessary that the college actually have a head, yet it must be at least capable of giving itself a presiding officer, or rector of the college. If, then, there be only two members and one be constituted the head, the other can not form the body, for the body requires several members, and the head is distinct from the body. He does not mean to assert, however, that if a college be reduced to two members, it can not preserve its corporate rights. On the contrary, the canon law explicitly affirms that one surviving member can conserve the privileges of the corporate body, not for himself personally, but for the college. When a legally constituted college has been reduced to two members, one can elect the other as prelate. If the college be reduced to one member, it becomes a virtual, not an actual, corporation. The single remaining member can exercise the acts belonging to the college, and although he can not elect himself prelate, yet he can choose or nominate some other proper person to the prelacy. He may also commit the election to other persons, or even to one, as the bishop.

The ancient canonists, when stating that three constitute a college, give also the numbers requisite for other canonical bodies, thus: five are necessary to form a university, two a congregation, more than two a family, and ten a parish. Among conspicuous ecclesiastical colleges may be mentioned the College of Cardinals and collegiate and cathedral chapters. The name college is specially applied also to corporate educational bodies within the Church, as without it.

Before the Protestant Reformation, and even in the first years of Elizabeth I of England, the colleges of Oxford and Cambridge were always spoken of as ecclesiastical corporations. By English law they are now purely lay corporations.

== Apostolic Colleges ==
The title "Apostolic College" is applied in Rome to those institutions which are immediately subject to and controlled by the Holy See, and are consequently exempt from any other spiritual or temporal authority; the students are declared to be under the direct protection of the pope. Such institutions are, among others, the College of the Propaganda, and the Roman Colleges.

== See also ==
- Team of priests in solidum
- Titular church
