= Moutier District =

Coordinates: 47.2667°N 7.36667°E

Moutier District District de Moutier
- District
- Flag Coat of arms

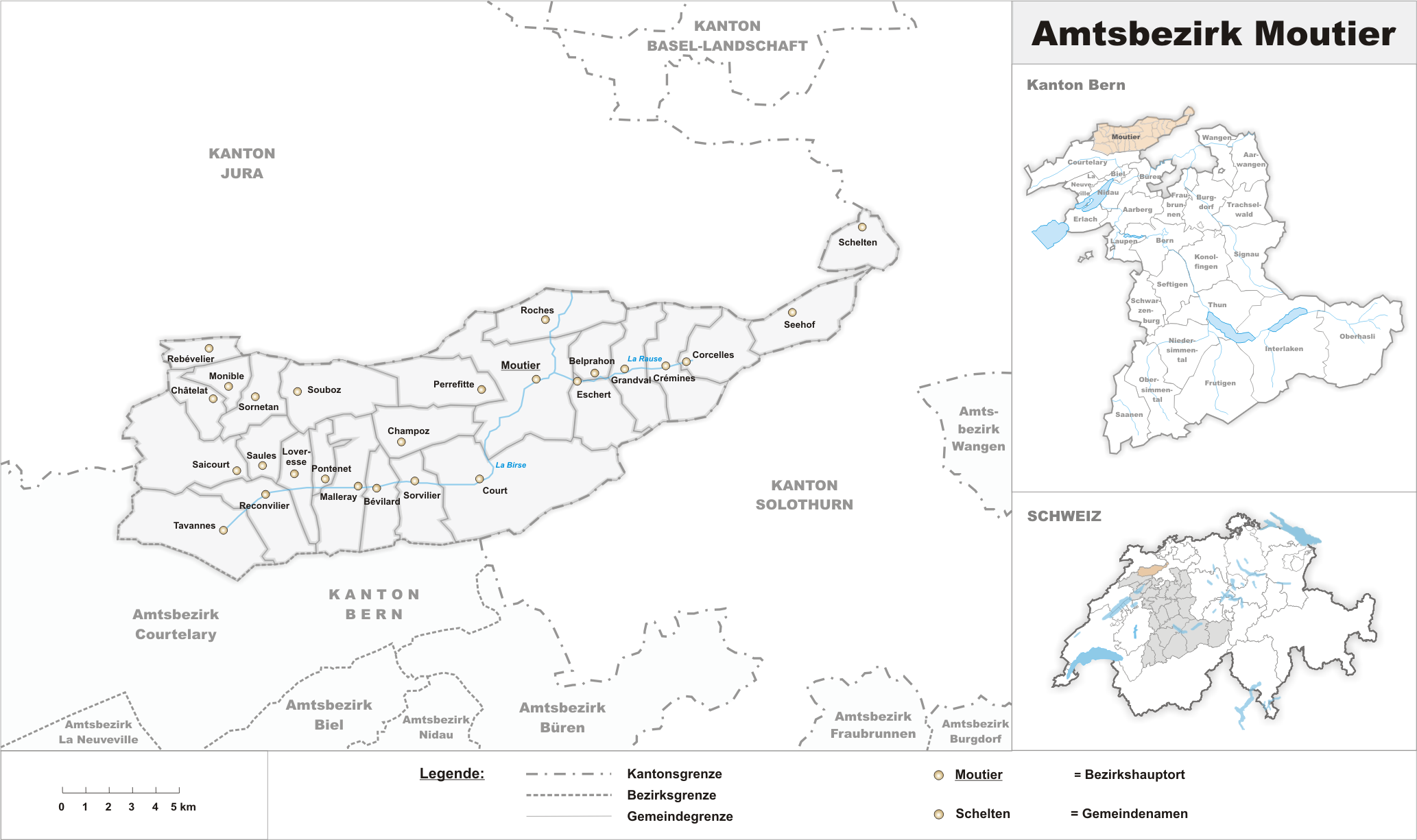
- Country: Switzerland
- Canton: Bern
- Capital: Moutier

Area
  - Total: 216 km^{2} (83 sq mi)

Population (2007)
  - Total: 22,954
  - Density: 106/km^{2} (275/sq mi)
- Time zone: UTC+1 (CET)
  - Summer (DST): UTC+2 (CEST)
- Municipalities: 26

Moutier District was one of the three French-speaking districts of the Bernese Jura in the canton of Bern with the seat being Moutier, the other two being Courtelary and La Neuveville. It had a population of about 23,098 in 2004. On 1 January 2010, the district lost its administrative power while being replaced by the Bernese Jura, whose administrative centre is Courtelary. Since 2010, it remains therefore a fully recognised district under the law and the Constitution (Art.3 al.2) of the Canton of Berne.

On 1 January 2026, the town of Moutier joined the canton of Jura. A Moutier District was created, with Moutier being the only municipality of the district. This measure is meant to be temporary, with long-term options still being debated.

== Municipalities in the former Bernese district of Moutier ==
Municipality	Population (Dec 2007)	Area (km^{2})
Belprahon	316	3.79
Bévilard	1700	5.63
Champoz	153	7.11
Châtelat	123	4.09
Corcelles BE	237	6.78
Court BE	1381	24.60
Crémines	551	9.35
Elay (Seehof)	82	8.42
Eschert	363	6.56
Grandval	340	8.21
Loveresse	324	4.64
Malleray	1914	10.35
Monible	37	3.39
Moutier	7462	19.53
Perrefitte	489	8.67
Pontenet	198	2.74
Rebévelier	51	3.52
Reconvilier	2227	8.23
Roches	227	8.97
Saicourt	577	13.75
Saules BE	155	4.25
Schelten (La Scheulte)	49	5.61
Seehof	72	8.4
Sornetan	130	5.62
Sorvilier	271	7.02
Souboz	129	10.63
Tavannes	3478	14.65

== Provisional district (2026) ==
Moutier District District de Moutier
- District
- Flag Coat of arms

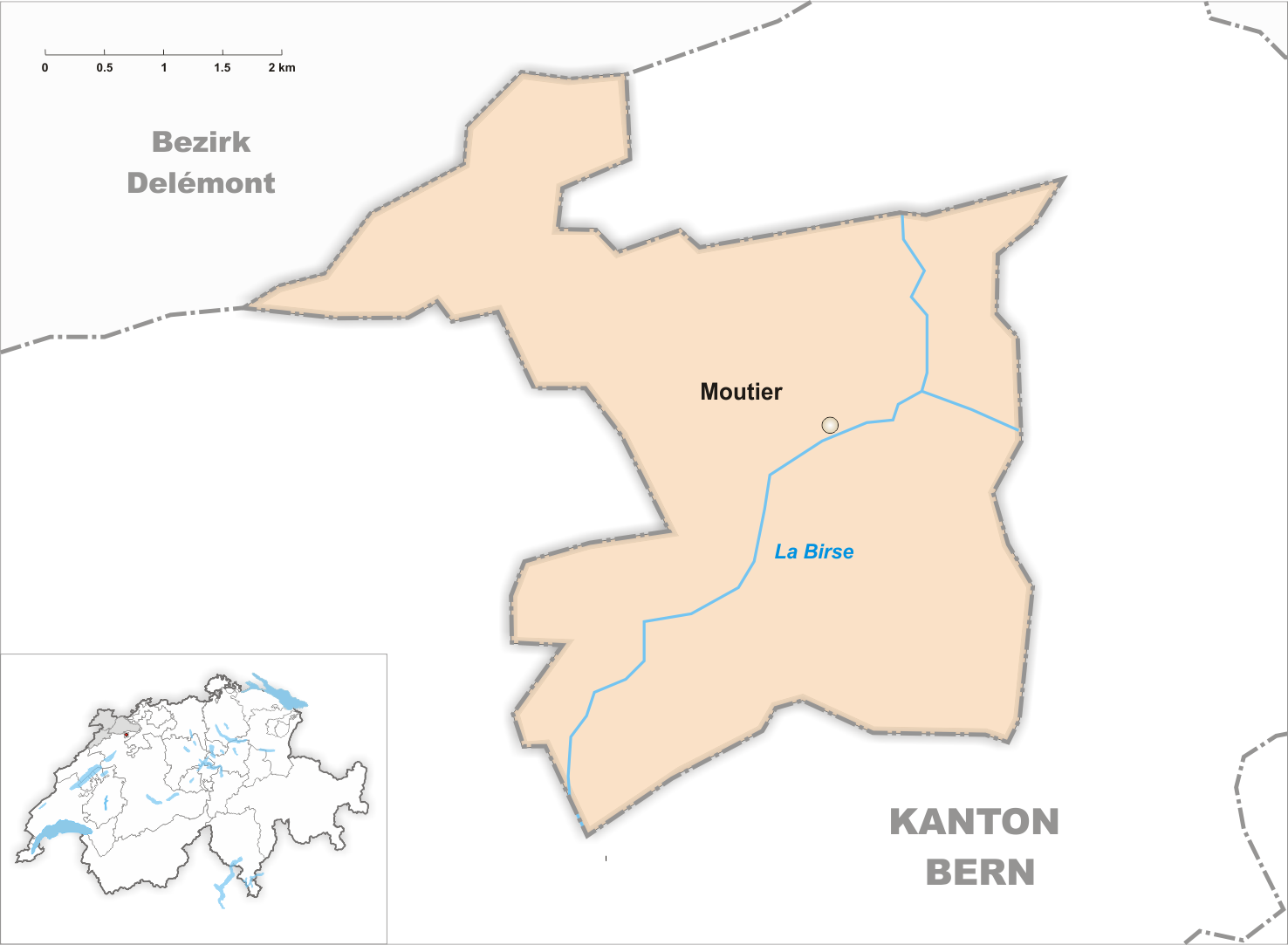
- Country: Switzerland
- Canton: Jura
- Capital: Moutier

Area
  - Total: 19 km^{2} (7.3 sq mi)

Population (December 2020)
  - Total: 7,348
  - Density: 390/km^{2} (1,000/sq mi)
- Time zone: UTC+1 (CET)
  - Summer (DST): UTC+2 (CEST)
- Municipalities: 1

On 1 January 2026, the town of Moutier was officially incorporated into the canton of Jura, which subsequently resulted in the creation of a new Moutier District, consisting only of the municipality of Moutier. The amendment to the cantonal constitution creating the district was approved by every municipality in Jura.

== Municipalities in the Jurassien district of Moutier ==
Municipality	Population (Dec 2011)	Area (km^{2})
Moutier	7480	19.53
