= Valbirse =

- Municipality
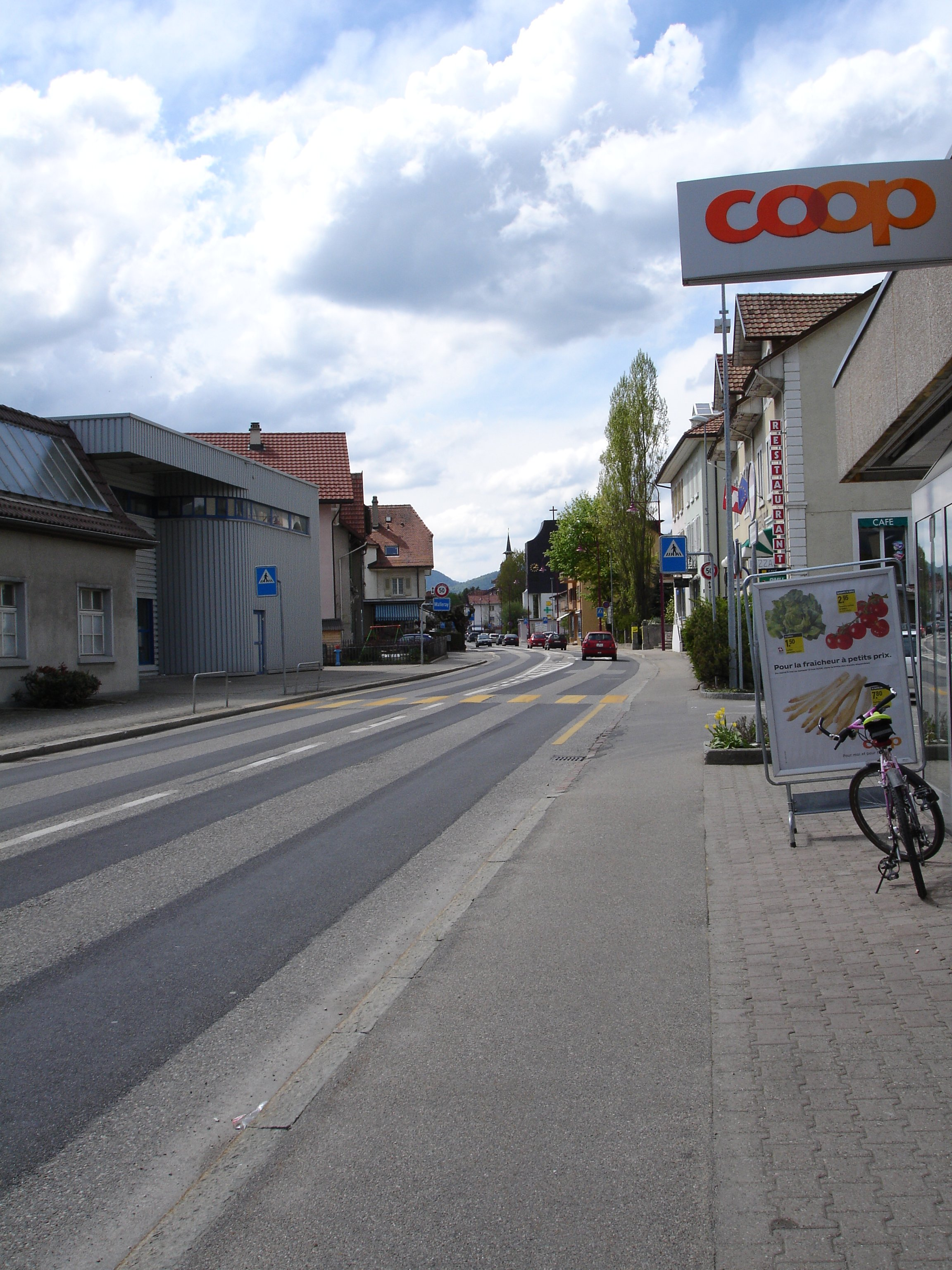
- Valbirse main road

- Flag Coat of arms
- Location of Valbirse
- Location within Switzerland Location within Canton of Bern
- Coordinates: 47°14′N 7°16′E
- Country: Switzerland
- Canton: Bern
- District: Jura bernois

Government
  - Executive: Conseil municipal with 7 members
  - Mayor: Maire; Jacques-Henri Jufer (as of 2026)
  - Parliament: Conseil général with 30 members

Area
  - Total: 18.67 km^{2} (7.21 sq mi)
- Elevation: 699 m (2,293 ft)

Population (Dec 2013)
  - Total: 3,919
  - Density: 209.9/km^{2} (543.7/sq mi)
- Time zone: UTC+01:00 (CET)
  - Summer (DST): UTC+02:00 (CEST)
- Postal code: 2733/2735
- SFOS number: 717
- ISO 3166 code: CH-BE
- Surrounded by: Reconvilier, Loveresse, Champoz, Péry-La Heutte
- Twin towns: Tar (Hungary)
- Website: https://www.valbirse.ch/

Valbirse is a municipality in the Jura bernois administrative district in the canton of Bern in Switzerland. It is located in the French-speaking Bernese Jura (Jura Bernois).

On 1 January 2015 the former municipalities of Bévilard, Malleray and Pontenet merged to form the new municipality of Valbirse.

== History ==
=== Bévilard ===
Bévilard is first mentioned in 1182 as Bevilar. In German it was known as Bewiler though this is not used currently.

Very little is known about the early history of the village. During the 13th and 14th centuries the noble Bévilard family appear in a few records. Throughout much of its existence, it was owned by the Provost of Moutier-Grandval Abbey. After the 1797 French victory and the Treaty of Campo Formio, Bévilard became part of the French Département of Haut-Rhin. After Napoleon's defeat and the Congress of Vienna, Bévilard was assigned to the Canton of Bern in 1815.

The village parish church of Saint-Georges was first mentioned in 1263. The current church building is from 1716. In 1531 the Protestant Reformation entered the village and the new faith was adopted. The church was the center of a parish that originally included Bévilard, Malleray and Pontenet. In the 18th century the municipality of Champoz joined the parish. In 1746 a filial church of the parish was established in Sornetan.

The village was generally agrarian until the Basel-Delémont-Biel railroad built a station between Bévilard and Malleray in 1877. The convenient link to the transportation network encouraged several precision machining and watch making factories to set up in the municipality. In 1882 the Hélios gear factory opened and was followed in 1915 Schäublin machining factory. The watch industry was a major source of income and led to a growing population in the municipality until the 1970s. Beginning in the 1970s, competition from cheaper electronic watches forced many Swiss watchmakers out of business and the population in Bévilard dropped.

=== Malleray ===
Malleray is first mentioned in 1179 as Malareia. The municipality was formerly known by its German name Mallaraya, however, that name is no longer used.

Very little is known about the early history of the village. In 1367, the Prince-Bishop of Basel, Johann von Vienne, sent troops to try to force Biel to break a burgrecht treaty that they had entered into with the city of Bern. At Malleray, the Basel troops encountered and were defeated by an army from Solothurn that was marching to support Bern against Basel. The noble de Malleray family appear in historic records during the 14th and 15th centuries. They may have been a cadet line of the local Tavannes family. Over the following centuries, the provost of Moutier-Grandval Abbey gradually acquired most of the rights and lands in the village. After the secularization of the Abbey following the adoption of the Protestant Reformation in Bern, during the end of the 16th century Malleray became part of a bailiwick under the diocese of Basel. After the 1797 French victory and the Treaty of Campo Formio, Malleray became part of the French Département of Mont-Terrible. Three years later, in 1800 it became part of the Département of Haut-Rhin. After Napoleon's defeat and the Congress of Vienna, Malleray was assigned to the Canton of Bern in 1815.

The watch making industry started in the village in 1846 and began to change it from an agrarian village into an industrial town. The construction of the Tavannes-Moutier railroad in 1874-77 increased the rate of change. The population grew rapidly as watch factory jobs brought new residents. Even today, about half of all jobs in Malleray are in precision industries.

=== Pontenet ===
Pontenet is first mentioned in 1359 as Pontenat.

By 1371 Bellelay Abbey was one of the major landholders in the village. In 1515 they granted their lands in the village to Grosjean Girod de Loveresse. During the Early Modern era it was administered by the provost of Moutier-Grandval for the Prince-Bishop of Basel. In 1750 the Birs river flooded and destroyed the village mill, sawmill and bridge over the river. After the 1797 French victory and the Treaty of Campo Formio, Pontenet became part of the French Department of Mont-Terrible. Three years later, in 1800 it became part of the Department of Haut-Rhin. After Napoleon's defeat and the Congress of Vienna, Pontenet was assigned to the Canton of Bern in 1815. Throughout its history it was part of the parish of Bévilard.

In 1876, the Tavannes-Court branch line was built off the main Biel-Sonceboz-Delémont-Basel railroad. However, it was over forty years later, in 1918, that the train finally stopped in Pontenet. A few small workshops developed along the road and railroad into town.

== Geography ==
The commune takes its name from the Birs River, which flows through it from southwest to northeast.

The former municipalities that now make up Valbirse have a total combined area of 18.68 km^{2} (7.21 sq mi).

== Demographics ==
The total population of Valbirse (as of December 2020) is 3,971.

== Transportation ==
The municipality has two railway stations, Malleray-Bévilard and Pontenet. Both are located on the Sonceboz-Sombeval–Moutier line and have regular service to Biel/Bienne and Moutier.

== Historic population ==
The historical population is given in the following chart:

== See also ==
- Sandoz watches
