= Sorvilier =

- Municipality
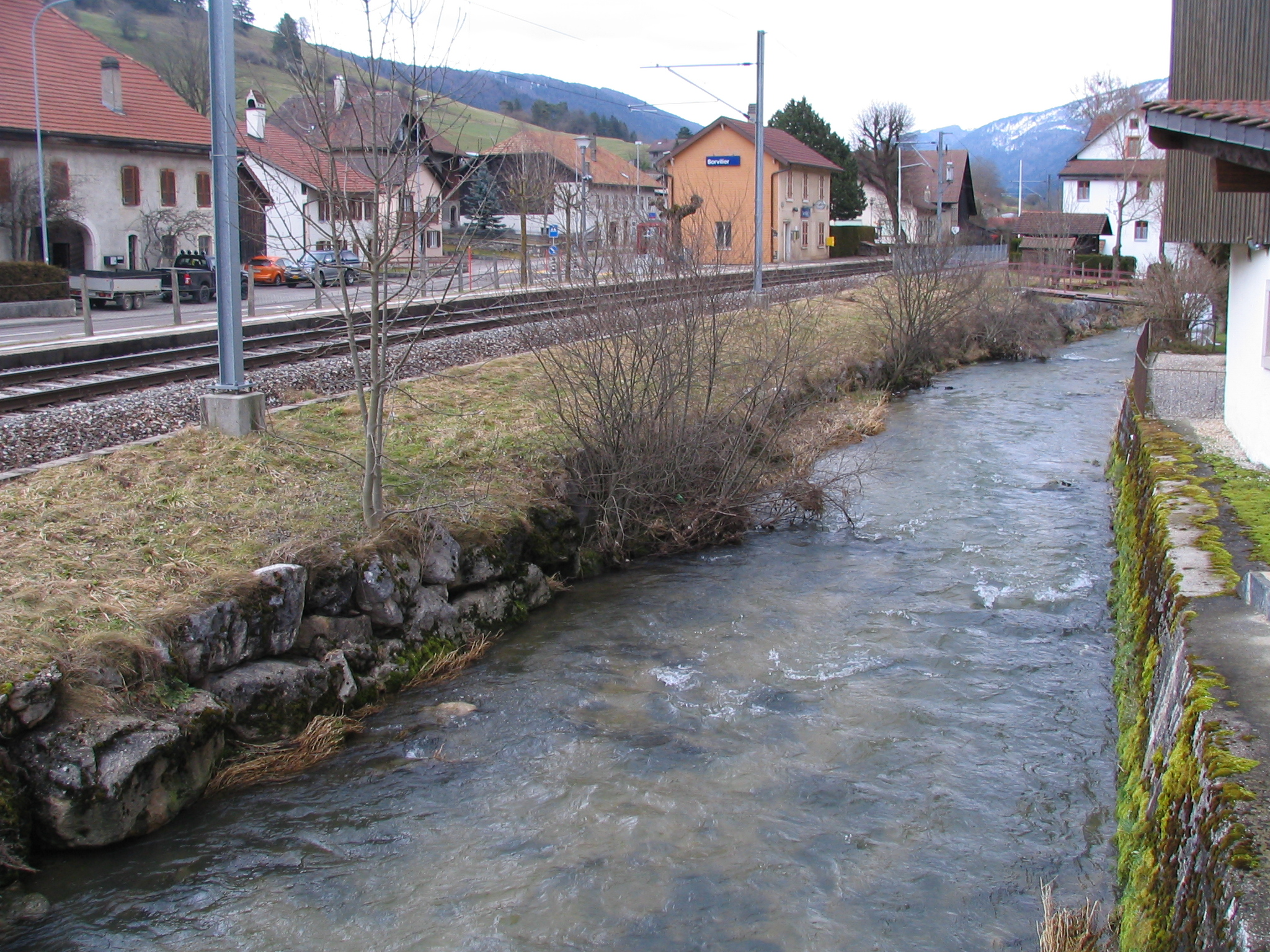
- The river Birs and the railroad station in Sorvilier

- Flag Coat of arms
- Location of Sorvilier
- Location within Switzerland Location within Canton of Bern
- Coordinates: 47°14′N 7°18′E
- Country: Switzerland
- Canton: Bern
- District: Jura bernois

Government
  - Executive: Conseil municipal with 5 members
  - Mayor: Maire; Florence Affolter (as of 2026)

Area
  - Total: 7.02 km^{2} (2.71 sq mi)
- Elevation: 681 m (2,234 ft)

Population (Dec 2011)
  - Total: 266
  - Density: 37.9/km^{2} (98.1/sq mi)
- Time zone: UTC+01:00 (CET)
  - Summer (DST): UTC+02:00 (CEST)
- Postal code: 2736
- SFOS number: 711
- ISO 3166 code: CH-BE
- Surrounded by: Bévilard, Champoz, Court BE, Romont, Péry
- Website: www.sorvilier.ch

Sorvilier (Frainc-Comtou: Sorvelie) is a municipality in the Jura bernois administrative district in the canton of Bern in Switzerland. It is located in the French-speaking Bernese Jura (Jura Bernois).

== History ==
Aerial view (1955)

Sorvilier is first mentioned in 1148 as Sorurvilier, though this comes from a 12th-century forgery. In 1179 it was mentioned as Sororviler. The municipality was formerly known by its German name Surbelen, however, that name is no longer used.

For most of its history Sorvilier was part of the district of Orval under the provost of Moutier-Grandval Abbey, which was part of the lands of the Prince-Bishop of Basel. In 1531, Sorvilier accepted the new faith of the Protestant Reformation. In 1773 a stone bridge was built over the river, connecting the village core with the left bank of the Birs river. After the 1797 French victory and the Treaty of Campo Formio, Sorvilier became part of the French Département of Mont-Terrible. Three years later, in 1800 it became part of the Département of Haut-Rhin. After Napoleon's defeat and the Congress of Vienna, Sorvilier was assigned to the Canton of Bern in 1815. The mid-19th century saw the establishment of the watch industry in the village. In 1877 the Delémont-Sonceboz-Biel railroad opened a station in Sorvilier and connected the growing watch industry with additional suppliers and customers. By 1900 about 100 workers produced watches and watch parts, while the village's population was only 438.

== Geography ==
Sorvilier has an area of 6.9 km^{2} (2.66 sq mi). As of 2012, a total of 3.15 km^{2} (1.22 mi^{2}) or 45.7% is used for agricultural purposes, while 3.37 km^{2} (1.30 mi^{2}) or 48.9% is forested. Of the rest of the land, 0.24 km^{2} (0.093 mi^{2}) or 3.5% is settled (buildings or roads), 0.05 km^{2} (12 acres) or 0.7% is either rivers or lakes and 0.03 km^{2} (7.4 acres) or 0.4% is unproductive land.

During the same year, housing and buildings made up 1.5% and transportation infrastructure made up 1.9%. Out of the forested land, 42.7% of the total land area is heavily forested and 6.2% is covered with orchards or small clusters of trees. Of the agricultural land, 10.4% is used for growing crops and 16.5% is pastures and 18.4% is used for alpine pastures. All the water in the municipality is flowing water.

The municipality is located in the Tavannes valley on both sides of the Birs river.

The municipalities of Bévilard, Court, Malleray, Pontenet and Sorvilier are considering a merger on 1 January 2015 into the new municipality of Valbirse.

On 31 December 2009 District de Moutier, the municipality's former district, was dissolved. On the following day, 1 January 2010, it joined the newly created Arrondissement administratif Jura bernois.

== Coat of arms ==
The blazon of the municipal coat of arms is Argent two Ears Gules slipped and leaved Vert issuant from a Mount of 3 Coupeaux of the last and in chief between those a Mullet of the second.

== Demographics ==
Sorvilier has a population (as of December 2020) of 283. As of 2010, 8.0% of the population are resident foreign nationals. Over the last 10 years (2001-2011) the population has changed at a rate of 1.1%. Migration accounted for 0.4%, while births and deaths accounted for 0.4%.

Most of the population (as of 2000) speaks French (246 or 90.4%) as their first language, German is the second most common (19 or 7.0%) and Albanian is the third (3 or 1.1%). There is 1 person who speaks Italian.

As of 2008, the population was 51.7% male and 48.3% female. The population was made up of 123 Swiss men (46.8% of the population) and 13 (4.9%) non-Swiss men. There were 119 Swiss women (45.2%) and 8 (3.0%) non-Swiss women. Of the population in the municipality, 95 or about 34.9% were born in Sorvilier and lived there in 2000. There were 103 or 37.9% who were born in the same canton, while 34 or 12.5% were born somewhere else in Switzerland, and 27 or 9.9% were born outside of Switzerland.

As of 2011, children and teenagers (0–19 years old) make up 19.9% of the population, while adults (20–64 years old) make up 60.9% and seniors (over 64 years old) make up 19.2%.

As of 2000, there were 105 people who were single and never married in the municipality. There were 136 married individuals, 17 widows or widowers and 14 individuals who are divorced.

As of 2010, there were 36 households that consist of only one person and 1 households with five or more people. In 2000, a total of 107 apartments (79.9% of the total) were permanently occupied, while 14 apartments (10.4%) were seasonally occupied and 13 apartments (9.7%) were empty. The vacancy rate for the municipality, in 2012, was 0.6%. In 2011, single family homes made up 45.4% of the total housing in the municipality.

The historical population is given in the following chart:

== Politics ==
In the 2011 federal election the most popular party was the Swiss People's Party (SVP) which received 30.9% of the vote. The next three most popular parties were the Social Democratic Party (SP) (21.5%), the Federal Democratic Union of Switzerland (EDU) (12.7%) and another local party (10.1%). In the federal election, a total of 84 votes were cast, and the voter turnout was 40.6%.

== Economy ==
As of 2011, Sorvilier had an unemployment rate of 1.42%. As of 2008, there were a total of 68 people employed in the municipality. Of these, there were 25 people employed in the primary economic sector and about 10 businesses involved in this sector. 13 people were employed in the secondary sector and there were 7 businesses in this sector. 30 people were employed in the tertiary sector, with 7 businesses in this sector. There were 148 residents of the municipality who were employed in some capacity, of which females made up 44.6% of the workforce.

In 2008 there were a total of 45 full-time equivalent jobs. The number of jobs in the primary sector was 15, all of which were in agriculture. The number of jobs in the secondary sector was 9 of which 8 were in manufacturing and 2 were in construction. The number of jobs in the tertiary sector was 21. In the tertiary sector; 3 or 14.3% were in wholesale or retail sales or the repair of motor vehicles, 2 or 9.5% were in a hotel or restaurant, 1 was a technical professional or scientist, 3 or 14.3% were in education and 10 or 47.6% were in health care.

In 2000, there were 16 workers who commuted into the municipality and 98 workers who commuted away. The municipality is a net exporter of workers, with about 6.1 workers leaving the municipality for every one entering. A total of 50 workers (75.8% of the 66 total workers in the municipality) both lived and worked in Sorvilier.

Of the working population, 10.8% used public transportation to get to work, and 64.2% used a private car.

In 2011 the average local and cantonal tax rate on a married resident, with two children, of Sorvilier making 150,000 CHF was 12.9%, while an unmarried resident's rate was 19%. For comparison, the rate for the entire canton in the same year, was 14.2% and 22.0%, while the nationwide rate was 12.3% and 21.1% respectively. In 2009 there were a total of 121 tax payers in the municipality. Of that total, 31 made over 75,000 CHF per year. There was one person who made between 15,000 and 20,000 per year. The greatest number of workers, 35, made between 50,000 and 75,000 CHF per year. The average income of the over 75,000 CHF group in Sorvilier was 100,132 CHF, while the average across all of Switzerland was 130,478 CHF.

In 2011 a total of 2.3% of the population received direct financial assistance from the government.

== Religion ==
From the 2000 census, 154 or 56.6% belonged to the Swiss Reformed Church, while 46 or 16.9% were Roman Catholic. Of the rest of the population, there was 1 member of an Orthodox church, and there were 18 individuals (or about 6.62% of the population) who belonged to another Christian church. There were 8 (or about 2.94% of the population) who were Islamic. There was 1 person who was Buddhist and 1 individual who belonged to another church. 34 (or about 12.50% of the population) belonged to no church, are agnostic or atheist, and 9 individuals (or about 3.31% of the population) did not answer the question.

== Education ==
In Sorvilier about 61.4% of the population have completed non-mandatory upper secondary education, and 7.1% have completed additional higher education (either university or a Fachhochschule). Of the 11 who had completed some form of tertiary schooling listed in the census, 63.6% were Swiss men, 18.2% were Swiss women.

The Canton of Bern school system provides one year of non-obligatory Kindergarten, followed by six years of Primary school. This is followed by three years of obligatory lower Secondary school where the students are separated according to ability and aptitude. Following the lower Secondary students may attend additional schooling or they may enter an apprenticeship.

During the 2011-12 school year, there were a total of 17 students attending classes in Sorvilier. There were no kindergarten classes in the municipality. The municipality had one primary class and 17 students. Of the primary students, 17.6% have a different mother language than the classroom language.

As of 2000, there were a total of 17 students attending any school in the municipality. All 17 both lived and attended school in the municipality, while 19 students from Sorvilier attended schools outside the municipality.

== Transportation ==
The municipality has a railway station, Sorvilier. The station is located on the Sonceboz-Sombeval–Moutier line and has regular service to Biel/Bienne and Moutier.
