= Court, Switzerland =

Court
- Municipality
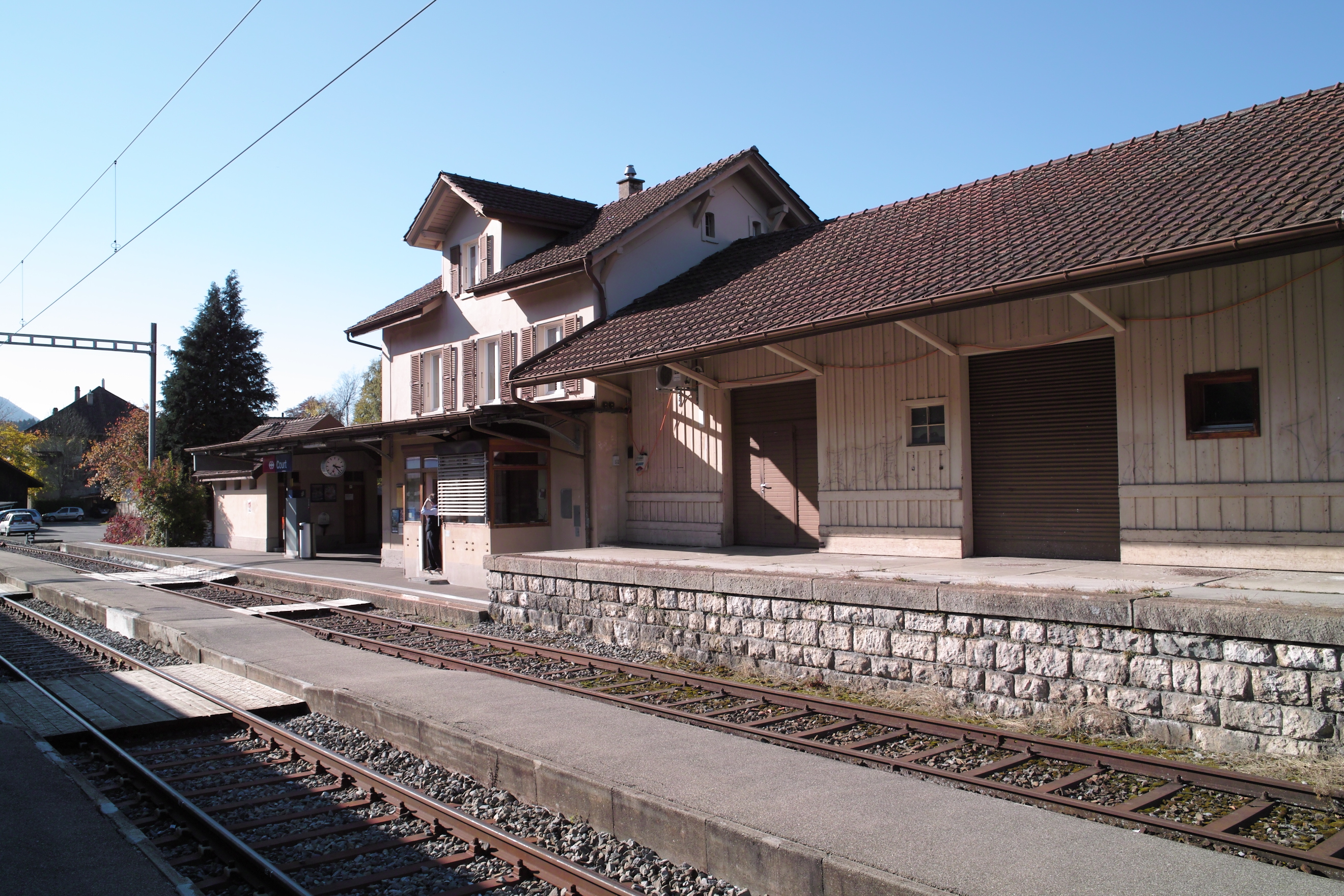
- Court railroad station

- Flag Coat of arms
- Location of Court
- Location within Switzerland Location within Canton of Bern
- Coordinates: 47°14′N 7°20′E
- Country: Switzerland
- Canton: Bern
- District: Jura bernois

Government
  - Mayor: Maire; Nathalie Schranz Ind.

Area
  - Total: 24.60 km^{2} (9.50 sq mi)
- Elevation: 666 m (2,185 ft)

Population (Dec 2011)
  - Total: 1,382
  - Density: 56.18/km^{2} (145.5/sq mi)
- Time zone: UTC+01:00 (CET)
  - Summer (DST): UTC+02:00 (CEST)
- Postal code: 2738
- SFOS number: 690
- ISO 3166 code: CH-BE
- Surrounded by: Romont, Sorvilier, Champoz, Moutier, Eschert, Gänsbrunnen, Selzach, Grenchen
- Website: www.court.ch

Court is a municipality in the Jura bernois administrative district in the canton of Bern in Switzerland. It is located in the French-speaking Bernese Jura (Jura Bernois).

== History ==
Aerial view (1947)

Court is first mentioned in 1148 as Cort.

Between the 12th and 15th centuries the village of Mévilier or Minvilier existed between Court and Champoz. During the 15th Mévilier village was abandoned for an unknown reason. For most of its history, Court was part of the district of Orval which was owned by the provost of Moutier-Grandval Abbey. After the 1797 French victory and the Treaty of Campo Formio, Court became part of the French Département of Mont-Terrible. Three years later, in 1800 it became part of the Département of Haut-Rhin. After Napoleon's defeat and the Congress of Vienna, Court was assigned to the Canton of Bern in 1815.

Originally, Court was part of the parish of Mévilier. By the 16th century it was part of the parish of Sorvilier. In 1531, Court adopted the new faith of the Protestant Reformation. The old parish church of Mévilier remained in operation as a filial church for Court until about 1715. Then the residents of Court attended a church in the village of Vélé, between Court and Sorvilier. Finally, in 1864 a church was built in Court.

During the Middle Ages there were sawmills, mines and smelters in the village. In 1658 there were four glass blowing shops in the village of le Chaluet. They remained in operation until 1738. Beginning at the end of the 18th century, pottery was produced in the municipality. The first major road through the Court Gorge in 1752 connected the village to the rest of the country and allowed it to grow. A railroad station of the Delémont-Sonceboz-Biel railroad was built in 1877. In 1911-16 a tunnel was built through the Jura Mountains which connected Court to Moutier and Grenchen. The excellent transportation links encouraged small factories to settle in Court. During the second half of the 19th century, engineering, watch-making and machining companies settled here. Today about two-thirds of the workers in the municipality work in the industrial sector, mostly in small companies.

== Geography ==
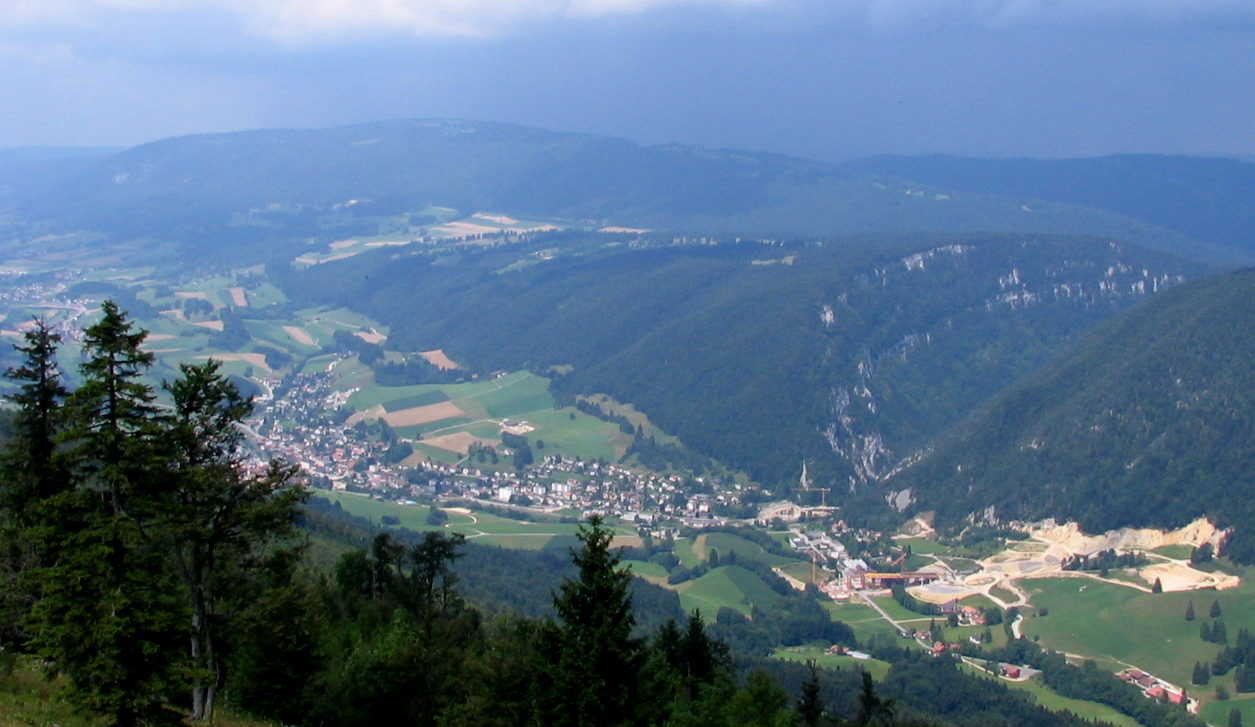
Court

Court has an area of 24.61 km^{2} (9.50 sq mi). As of 2012, a total of 8.44 km^{2} (3.26 mi^{2}) or 34.3% is used for agricultural purposes, while 14.76 km^{2} (5.70 mi^{2}) or 60.0% is forested. Of the rest of the land, 1.14 km^{2} (0.44 mi^{2}) or 4.6% is settled (buildings or roads), 0.03 km^{2} (7.4 acres) or 0.1% is either rivers or lakes and 0.21 km^{2} (0.081 mi^{2}) or 0.9% is unproductive land.

During the same year, housing and buildings made up 2.0% and transportation infrastructure made up 1.7%. Out of the forested land, 56.0% of the total land area is heavily forested and 3.9% is covered with orchards or small clusters of trees. Of the agricultural land, 4.1% is used for growing crops and 8.8% is pastures and 21.3% is used for alpine pastures. All the water in the municipality is flowing water.

It consists of the Court is a linear village in the eastern portion of the Vallée de Tavannes and along the entrance to the Court Canyon through which the Birs River runs. It also includes about a dozen isolated farm houses in le Chaluet, on Graitery, on Mont Girod and in Montoz.

The municipalities of Bévilard, Court, Malleray, Pontenet and Sorvilier are considering a merger on 1 January 2015 into the new municipality of Valbirse.

On 31 December 2009 District de Moutier, the municipality's former district, was dissolved. On the following day, 1 January 2010, it joined the newly created Arrondissement administratif Jura bernois.

== Coat of arms ==
The blazon of the municipal coat of arms is Azure a Horn Or ringed Argent and stringed Gules and a Chief of the first three pales Or.

== Demographics ==
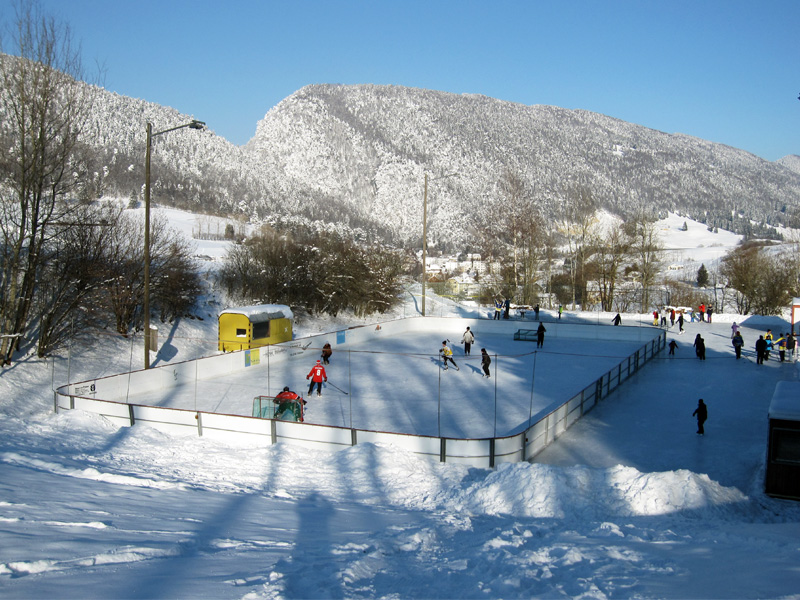
Playing ice hockey in Court in 2012

Court has a population (as of December 2020) of 1,417. As of 2010, 6.0% of the population are resident foreign nationals. Over the last 10 years (2001-2011) the population has changed at a rate of -0.8%. Migration accounted for -0.3%, while births and deaths accounted for -0.1%.

Most of the population (as of 2000) speaks French (1,202 or 89.1%) as their first language, German is the second most common (89 or 6.6%) and Portuguese is the third (14 or 1.0%). There are 13 people who speak Italian and 3 people who speak Romansh.

As of 2008, the population was 48.7% male and 51.3% female. The population was made up of 643 Swiss men (46.2% of the population) and 36 (2.6%) non-Swiss men. There were 667 Swiss women (47.9%) and 47 (3.4%) non-Swiss women. Of the population in the municipality, 630 or about 46.7% were born in Court and lived there in 2000. There were 343 or 25.4% who were born in the same canton, while 190 or 14.1% were born somewhere else in Switzerland, and 144 or 10.7% were born outside of Switzerland.

As of 2011, children and teenagers (0–19 years old) make up 23.2% of the population, while adults (20–64 years old) make up 56.9% and seniors (over 64 years old) make up 19.9%.

As of 2000, there were 527 people who were single and never married in the municipality. There were 656 married individuals, 112 widows or widowers and 54 individuals who are divorced.

As of 2010, there were 170 households that consist of only one person and 46 households with five or more people. In 2000, a total of 541 apartments (87.0% of the total) were permanently occupied, while 35 apartments (5.6%) were seasonally occupied and 46 apartments (7.4%) were empty. As of 2010, the construction rate of new housing units was 1.4 new units per 1000 residents. The vacancy rate for the municipality, in 2012, was 6.42%.

The historical population is given in the following chart:

== Politics ==
In the 2011 federal election the most popular party was the Swiss People's Party (SVP) which received 45.6% of the vote. The next three most popular parties were the Social Democratic Party (SP) (16.3%), another local party (11%) and the FDP.The Liberals (8.1%). In the federal election, a total of 367 votes were cast, and the voter turnout was 35.9%.

== Economy ==
As of 2011, Court had an unemployment rate of 1.75%. As of 2008, there were a total of 669 people employed in the municipality. Of these, there were 76 people employed in the primary economic sector and about 27 businesses involved in this sector. 432 people were employed in the secondary sector and there were 36 businesses in this sector. 161 people were employed in the tertiary sector, with 39 businesses in this sector. There were 675 residents of the municipality who were employed in some capacity, of which females made up 42.7% of the workforce.

In 2008 there were a total of 548 full-time equivalent jobs. The number of jobs in the primary sector was 55, of which 40 were in agriculture and 15 were in forestry or lumber production. The number of jobs in the secondary sector was 367 of which 350 or (95.4%) were in manufacturing and 17 (4.6%) were in construction. The number of jobs in the tertiary sector was 126. In the tertiary sector; 18 or 14.3% were in wholesale or retail sales or the repair of motor vehicles, 14 or 11.1% were in the movement and storage of goods, 21 or 16.7% were in a hotel or restaurant, 2 or 1.6% were in the information industry, 8 or 6.3% were technical professionals or scientists, 8 or 6.3% were in education and 21 or 16.7% were in health care.

In 2000, there were 376 workers who commuted into the municipality and 286 workers who commuted away. The municipality is a net importer of workers, with about 1.3 workers entering the municipality for every one leaving. A total of 389 workers (51.4% of the 757 total workers in the municipality) both lived and worked in Court. About 2.1% of the workforce coming into Court are coming from outside Switzerland. Of the working population, 5.5% used public transportation to get to work, and 56.1% used a private car.

In 2011 the average local and cantonal tax rate on a married resident, with two children, of Court making 150,000 CHF was 13.3%, while an unmarried resident's rate was 19.5%. For comparison, the rate for the entire canton in the same year, was 14.2% for married residents and 22.0% for single. The nationwide rate was 12.3% and 21.1% respectively. In 2009 there were a total of 590 tax payers in the municipality. Of that total, 185 made over 75,000 CHF per year. There were 5 people who made between 15,000 and 20,000 per year. The average income of the over 75,000 CHF group in Court was 114,484 CHF, while the average across all of Switzerland was 130,478 CHF.

== Religion ==
From the 2000 census, 714 or 52.9% belonged to the Swiss Reformed Church, while 273 or 20.2% were Roman Catholic. Of the rest of the population, there were 200 individuals (or about 14.83% of the population) who belonged to another Christian church. There were 22 (or about 1.63% of the population) who were Islamic. 98 (or about 7.26% of the population) belonged to no church, are agnostic or atheist, and 42 individuals (or about 3.11% of the population) did not answer the question.

== Education ==
In Court about 56.8% of the population have completed non-mandatory upper secondary education, and 9.1% have completed additional higher education (either university or a Fachhochschule). Of the 78 who had completed some form of tertiary schooling listed in the census, 50.0% were Swiss men, 35.9% were Swiss women, 9.0% were non-Swiss men.

The Canton of Bern school system provides one year of non-obligatory Kindergarten, followed by six years of Primary school. This is followed by three years of obligatory lower Secondary school where the students are separated according to ability and aptitude. Following the lower Secondary students may attend additional schooling or they may enter an apprenticeship.

During the 2011-12 school year, there were a total of 112 students attending classes in Court. There were 2 kindergarten classes with a total of 31 students in the municipality. Of the kindergarten students, 6.5% were permanent or temporary residents of Switzerland (not citizens) and 12.9% have a different mother language than the classroom language. The municipality had 4 primary classes and 81 students. Of the primary students, 4.9% were permanent or temporary residents of Switzerland (not citizens) and 7.4% have a different mother language than the classroom language.

As of 2000, there were a total of 101 students attending any school in the municipality. Of those, 101 both lived and attended school in the municipality, while 94 students from Court attended schools outside the municipality. During the same year, 94 residents attended schools outside the municipality.

== Transportation ==
The municipality has a railway station, Court. The station is located on the Sonceboz-Sombeval–Moutier line and has regular service to Biel/Bienne and Moutier.
