= Pontenet =

- Former municipality
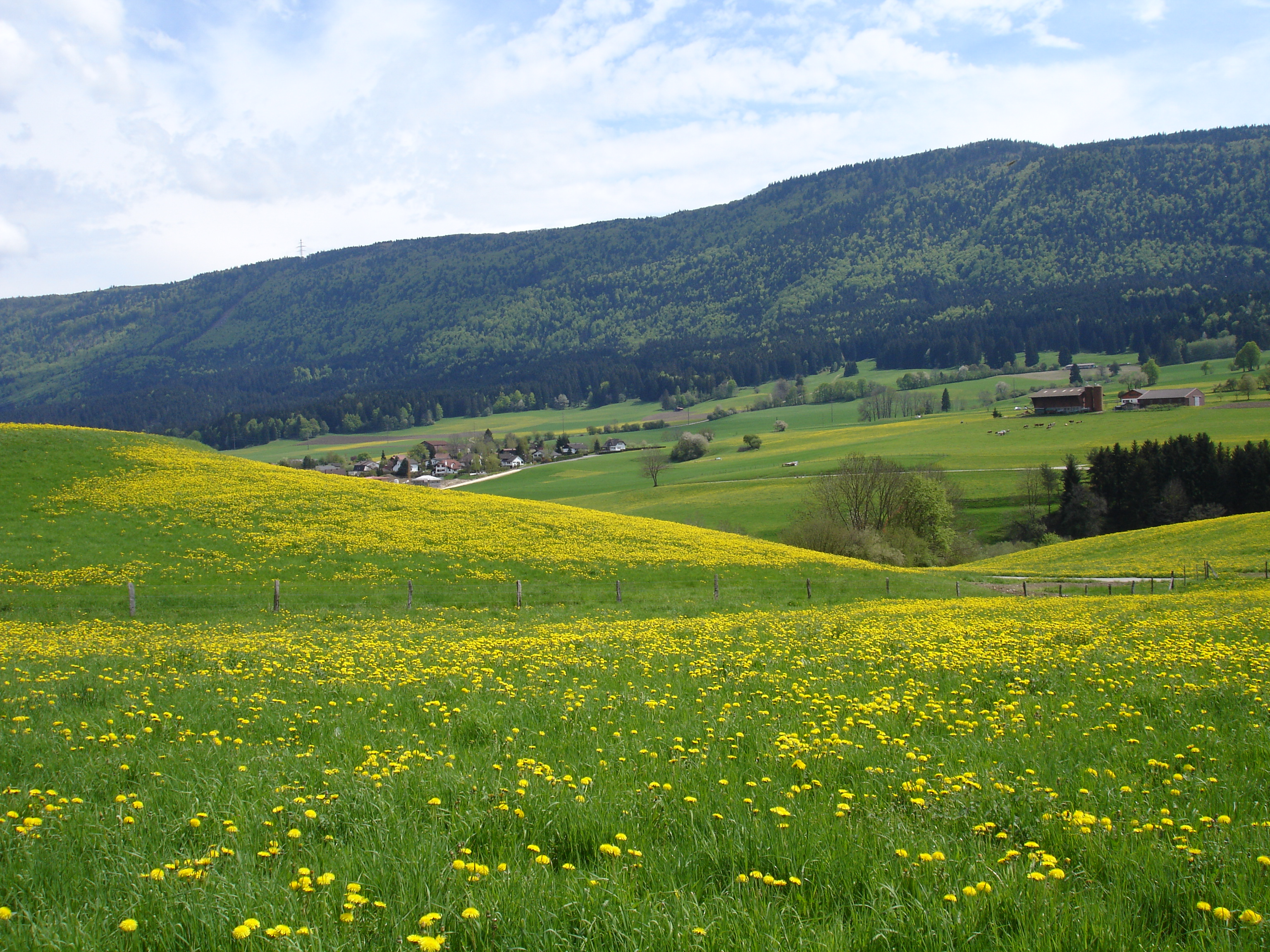
- Looking across the fields toward Pontenet village

- Flag Coat of arms
- Location of Pontenet
- Location within Switzerland Location within Canton of Bern
- Coordinates: 47°15′N 7°15′E
- Country: Switzerland
- Canton: Bern
- District: Jura bernois

Government
  - Mayor: Maire

Area
  - Total: 2.74 km^{2} (1.06 sq mi)
- Elevation: 741 m (2,431 ft)

Population (Dec 2011)
  - Total: 216
  - Density: 78.8/km^{2} (204/sq mi)
- Time zone: UTC+01:00 (CET)
  - Summer (DST): UTC+02:00 (CEST)
- Postal code: 2733
- SFOS number: 702
- ISO 3166 code: CH-BE
- Surrounded by: Loveresse, Souboz, Malleray
- Website: www.valbirse.ch

Pontenet is a municipality in the Jura bernois administrative district in the canton of Bern in Switzerland. It is located in the French-speaking Bernese Jura (Jura Bernois). On 1 January 2015 the former municipalities of Bévilard, Malleray and Pontenet merged to form the new municipality of Valbirse.

== History ==
Pontenet is first mentioned in 1359 as Pontenat.

By 1371 Bellelay Abbey was one of the major landholders in the village. In 1515 they granted their lands in the village to Grosjean Girod de Loveresse. During the Early Modern era it was administered by the provost of Moutier-Grandval for the Prince-Bishop of Basel. In 1750 the Birs river flooded and destroyed the village mill, sawmill and bridge over the river. After the 1797 French victory and the Treaty of Campo Formio, Pontenet became part of the French Département of Mont-Terrible. Three years later, in 1800 it became part of the Département of Haut-Rhin. After Napoleon's defeat and the Congress of Vienna, Pontenet was assigned to the Canton of Bern in 1815. Throughout its history it was part of the parish of Bévilard.

In 1876 the Tavannes-Court branch line was built off the main Biel-Sonceboz-Delémont-Basel railroad. However, it was over forty years later, in 1918, that the train finally stopped in Pontenet. A few small workshops developed along the road and railroad into town.

== Geography ==
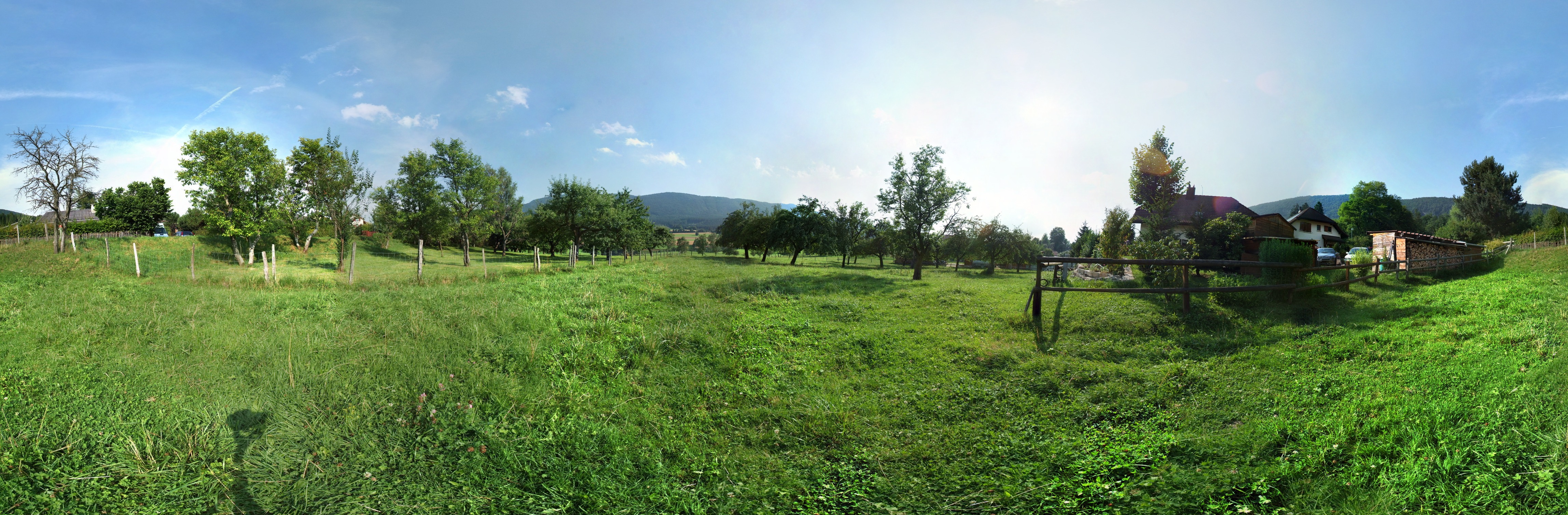
Panorama of fields outside Pontenet

Before the merger, Pontenet had a total area of 2.7 km^{2} (1.0 mi^{2}). As of 2012, a total of 1.32 km^{2} (0.51 mi^{2}) or 48.4% is used for agricultural purposes, while 1.21 km^{2} (0.47 mi^{2}) or 44.3% is forested. Of the rest of the land, 0.17 km^{2} (0.066 mi^{2}) or 6.2% is settled (buildings or roads).

During the same year, housing and buildings made up 4.0% and transportation infrastructure made up 1.5%. Out of the forested land, 38.5% of the total land area is heavily forested and 5.9% is covered with orchards or small clusters of trees. Of the agricultural land, 8.8% is used for growing crops and 12.8% is pastures, while 1.5% is used for orchards or vine crops and 25.3% is used for alpine pastures.

The municipality is located in the Tavannes valley, at the foot of Moron mountain.

On 31 December 2009 District de Moutier, the municipality's former district, was dissolved. On the following day, 1 January 2010, it joined the newly created Arrondissement administratif Jura bernois.

== Coat of arms ==
The blazon of the municipal coat of arms is Gules a Bridge Argent and a Mullet of the same. The bridge (French: pont) makes this an example of canting arms.

== Demographics ==
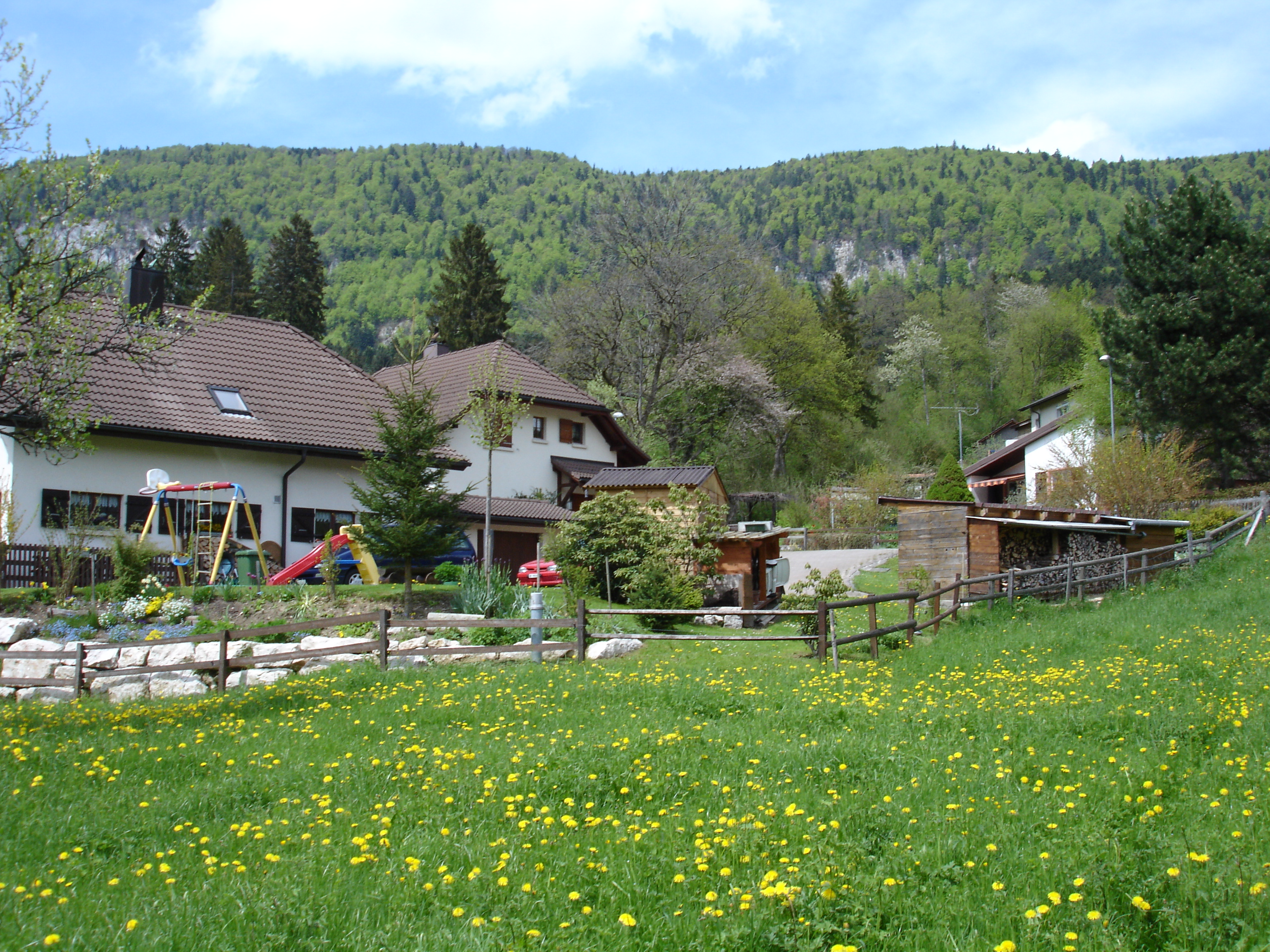
Houses in Pontenet municipality

Pontenet had a population (as of 2013) of 217. As of 2010, 9.6% of the population are resident foreign nationals. Over the last 10 years (2001–2011) the population has changed at a rate of 3.3%. Migration accounted for 2.9%, while births and deaths accounted for 0%.

Most of the population (as of 2000) speaks French (170 or 89.5%) as their first language, German is the second most common (18 or 9.5%) and Italian is the third (1 or 0.5%).

As of 2008, the population was 51.7% male and 48.3% female. The population was made up of 94 Swiss men (45.0% of the population) and 14 (6.7%) non-Swiss men. There were 95 Swiss women (45.5%) and 6 (2.9%) non-Swiss women. Of the population in the municipality, 53 or about 27.9% were born in Pontenet and lived there in 2000. There were 79 or 41.6% who were born in the same canton, while 37 or 19.5% were born somewhere else in Switzerland, and 15 or 7.9% were born outside of Switzerland.

As of 2011, children and teenagers (0–19 years old) make up 25% of the population, while adults (20–64 years old) make up 56% and seniors (over 64 years old) make up 19%.

As of 2000, there were 73 people who were single and never married in the municipality. There were 100 married individuals, 9 widows or widowers and 8 individuals who are divorced.

As of 2010, there were 26 households that consist of only one person and 6 households with five or more people. In 2000, a total of 77 apartments (79.4% of the total) were permanently occupied, while 14 apartments (14.4%) were seasonally occupied and 6 apartments (6.2%) were empty. As of 2010, the construction rate of new housing units was 4.8 new units per 1000 residents. In 2011, single family homes made up 65.4% of the total housing in the municipality.

The historical population is given in the following chart:

== Politics ==
In the 2011 federal election the most popular party was the Social Democratic Party (SP) which received 32.2% of the vote. The next three most popular parties were the Swiss People's Party (SVP) (26.2%), another local party (7.9%) and the Conservative Democratic Party (BDP) (6.4%). In the federal election, a total of 85 votes were cast, and the voter turnout was 55.2%.

== Economy ==
As of 2011, Pontenet had an unemployment rate of 1.28%. As of 2008, there were a total of 42 people employed in the municipality. Of these, there were 10 people employed in the primary economic sector and about 4 businesses involved in this sector. 9 people were employed in the secondary sector and there were 2 businesses in this sector. 23 people were employed in the tertiary sector, with 6 businesses in this sector. There were 95 residents of the municipality who were employed in some capacity, of which females made up 45.3% of the workforce.

In 2008 there were a total of 30 full-time equivalent jobs. The number of jobs in the primary sector was 6, all in agriculture. The number of jobs in the secondary sector was 8, all in manufacturing. The number of jobs in the tertiary sector was 16. In the tertiary sector; 13 or 81.3% were in wholesale or retail sales or the repair of motor vehicles while 2 or 12.5% were in education.

In 2000, there were 30 workers who commuted into the municipality and 73 workers who commuted away. The municipality is a net exporter of workers, with about 2.4 workers leaving the municipality for every one entering. A total of 22 workers (42.3% of the 52 total workers in the municipality) both lived and worked in Pontenet. Of the working population, 4.2% used public transportation to get to work, and 74.7% used a private car.

In 2011 the average local and cantonal tax rate on a married resident, with two children, of Pontenet making 150,000 CHF was 13.2%, while an unmarried resident's rate was 19.4%. For comparison, the rate for the entire canton in the same year, was 14.2% and 22.0%, while the nationwide rate was 12.3% and 21.1% respectively. In 2009 there were a total of 84 tax payers in the municipality. Of that total, 24 made over 75,000 CHF per year. The greatest number of workers, 30, made between 50,000 and 75,000 CHF per year. The average income of the over 75,000 CHF group in Pontenet was 121,983 CHF, while the average across all of Switzerland was 130,478 CHF. In 2011 a total of 1.4% of the population received direct financial assistance from the government.

== Religion ==
From the 2000 census, 117 or 61.6% belonged to the Swiss Reformed Church, while 38 or 20.0% were Roman Catholic. Of the rest of the population, there were 5 individuals (or about 2.63% of the population) who belonged to another Christian church. There was 1 individual who was Islamic. 25 (or about 13.16% of the population) belonged to no church, are agnostic or atheist, and 4 individuals (or about 2.11% of the population) did not answer the question.

== Education ==
In Pontenet about 55.9% of the population have completed non-mandatory upper secondary education, and 12.7% have completed additional higher education (either university or a Fachhochschule). Of the 15 who had completed some form of tertiary schooling listed in the census, 73.3% were Swiss men, 20.0% were Swiss women.

The Canton of Bern school system provides one year of non-obligatory Kindergarten, followed by six years of Primary school. This is followed by three years of obligatory lower Secondary school where the students are separated according to ability and aptitude. Following the lower Secondary students may attend additional schooling or they may enter an apprenticeship.

During the 2011–12 school year, there were a total of 17 students attending classes in Pontenet. There were no kindergarten classes in the municipality. The municipality had one primary class and 17 students. Of the primary students, 17.6% were permanent or temporary residents of Switzerland (not citizens) and 17.6% have a different mother language than the classroom language.

As of 2000, there were a total of 21 students attending any school in the municipality. Of those, 20 both lived and attended school in the municipality, while one student came from another municipality. During the same year, 10 residents attended schools outside the municipality.
