= Bévilard =

- Former municipality
- Flag Coat of arms
- Location of Bévilard
- Location within Switzerland Location within Canton of Bern
- Coordinates: 47°14′N 7°17′E
- Country: Switzerland
- Canton: Bern
- District: Jura bernois

Government
  - Mayor: Maire

Area
  - Total: 5.63 km^{2} (2.17 sq mi)
- Elevation: 691 m (2,267 ft)

Population (Dec 2011)
  - Total: 1,674
  - Density: 297/km^{2} (770/sq mi)
- Time zone: UTC+01:00 (CET)
  - Summer (DST): UTC+02:00 (CEST)
- Postal code: 2735
- SFOS number: 682
- ISO 3166 code: CH-BE
- Surrounded by: Malleray, Champoz, Sorvilier, Péry
- Website: www.valbirse.ch

Bévilard (Frainc-Comtou: Bévlaîd) is a municipality in the Jura bernois administrative district in the canton of Bern in Switzerland. It is located in the French-speaking Bernese Jura (Jura Bernois). On 1 January 2015 the former municipalities of Bévilard, Malleray and Pontenet merged to form the new municipality of Valbirse.

== History ==
Aerial view (1958)

Bévilard is first mentioned in 1182 as Bevilar. In German it was known as Bewiler though this is not used currently.

Very little is known about the early history of the village. During the 13th and 14th centuries the noble Bévilard family appear in a few records. Throughout much of its existence, it was owned by the Provost of Moutier-Grandval Abbey. After the 1797 French victory and the Treaty of Campo Formio, Bévilard became part of the French Département of Haut-Rhin. After Napoleon's defeat and the Congress of Vienna, Bévilard was assigned to the Canton of Bern in 1815.

The village parish church of Saint-Georges was first mentioned in 1263. The current church building is from 1716. In 1531 the Protestant Reformation entered the village and the new faith was adopted. The church was the center of a parish that originally included Bévilard, Malleray and Pontenet. In the 18th century the municipality of Champoz joined the parish. In 1746 a filial church of the parish was established in Sornetan.

The village was generally agrarian until the Basel-Delémont-Biel railroad built a station between Bévilard and Malleray in 1877. The convenient link to the transportation network encouraged several precision machining and watch making factories to set up in the municipality. In 1882 the Hélios gear factory opened and was followed in 1915 Schäublin machining factory. The watch industry was a major source of income and led to a growing population in the municipality until the 1970s. Beginning in the 1970s, competition from cheaper electronic watches forced many Swiss watchmakers out of business and the population in Bévilard dropped.

== Geography ==
Before the merger, Bévilard had a total area of 5.8 km^{2} (2.2 mi^{2}). As of 2012, a total of 2.31 km^{2} (0.89 mi^{2}) or 40.7% is used for agricultural purposes, while 2.75 km^{2} (1.06 mi^{2}) or 48.4% is forested. Of the rest of the land, 0.71 km^{2} (0.27 mi^{2}) or 12.5% is settled (buildings or roads), 0.01 km^{2} (2.5 acres) or 0.2% is either rivers or lakes.

During the same year, housing and buildings made up 7.4% and transportation infrastructure made up 3.5%. Out of the forested land, 40.7% of the total land area is heavily forested and 7.7% is covered with orchards or small clusters of trees. Of the agricultural land, 8.8% is used for growing crops, 12.7% is pastures and 18.7% is used for alpine pastures. All the water in the municipality is flowing water.

The municipality is located in the upper Birs River Valley. Over the years it and the village of Malleray have grown together into a single settled area.

On 31 December 2009 District de Moutier, the municipality's former district, was dissolved. On the following day, 1 January 2010, it joined the newly created Arrondissement administratif Jura bernois.

== Coat of arms ==
The blazon of the municipal coat of arms is Azure a Dagger Argent in bend hilted Or in chief.

== Demographics ==
Bévilard had a population (as of 2013) of 1,730. As of 2010, 15.3% of the population are resident foreign nationals. Over the last 10 years (2001-2011) the population has changed at a rate of -0.6%. Migration accounted for -0.2%, while births and deaths accounted for -0.8%.

Most of the population (as of 2000) speaks French (1,417 or 85.1%) as their first language, German is the second most common (99 or 5.9%) and Italian is the third (78 or 4.7%). There is 1 person who speaks Romansh.

As of 2008, the population was 49.9% male and 50.1% female. The population was made up of 694 Swiss men (41.2% of the population) and 146 (8.7%) non-Swiss men. There were 732 Swiss women (43.5%) and 112 (6.7%) non-Swiss women. Of the population in the municipality, 470 or about 28.2% were born in Bévilard and lived there in 2000. There were 619 or 37.2% who were born in the same canton, while 269 or 16.1% were born somewhere else in Switzerland, and 262 or 15.7% were born outside of Switzerland.

As of 2011, children and teenagers (0–19 years old) make up 20.1% of the population, while adults (20–64 years old) make up 58.7% and seniors (over 64 years old) make up 21.3%.

As of 2000, there were 589 people who were single and never married in the municipality. There were 884 married individuals, 125 widows or widowers and 68 individuals who are divorced.

As of 2010, there were 236 households that consist of only one person and 54 households with five or more people. In 2000, a total of 675 apartments (86.4% of the total) were permanently occupied, while 51 apartments (6.5%) were seasonally occupied and 55 apartments (7.0%) were empty. As of 2010, the construction rate of new housing units was 0.6 new units per 1000 residents. The vacancy rate for the municipality, in 2012, was 2.84%.

The historical population is given in the following chart:

== Politics ==
In the 2011 federal election the most popular party was the Swiss People's Party (SVP) which received 31.4% of the vote. The next three most popular parties were the Social Democratic Party (SP) (27.3%), the Federal Democratic Union of Switzerland (EDU) (8.8%) and the FDP.The Liberals (7.9%). In the federal election, a total of 482 votes were cast, and the voter turnout was 41.2%.

== Economy ==
As of 2011, Bévilard had an unemployment rate of 2.23%. As of 2008, there were a total of 788 people employed in the municipality. Of these, there were 16 people employed in the primary economic sector and about 7 businesses involved in this sector. 541 people were employed in the secondary sector and there were 20 businesses in this sector. 231 people were employed in the tertiary sector, with 42 businesses in this sector. There were 789 residents of the municipality who were employed in some capacity, of which females made up 37.6% of the workforce.

In 2008 there were a total of 694 full-time equivalent jobs. The number of jobs in the primary sector was 12, all of which were in agriculture. The number of jobs in the secondary sector was 511 of which 471 or (92.2%) were in manufacturing and 40 (7.8%) were in construction. The number of jobs in the tertiary sector was 171. In the tertiary sector; 55 or 32.2% were in wholesale or retail sales or the repair of motor vehicles, 15 or 8.8% were in a hotel or restaurant, 4 or 2.3% were in the information industry, 8 or 4.7% were the insurance or financial industry, 18 or 10.5% were technical professionals or scientists, 12 or 7.0% were in education and 6 or 3.5% were in health care.

In 2000, there were 379 workers who commuted into the municipality and 500 workers who commuted away. The municipality is a net exporter of workers, with about 1.3 workers leaving the municipality for every one entering. A total of 289 workers (43.5% of the 664 total workers in the municipality) both lived and worked in Bévilard. About 1.1% of the workforce coming into Bévilard are coming from outside Switzerland. Of the working population, 9.4% used public transportation to get to work, and 61.3% used a private car.

In 2011 the average local and cantonal tax rate on a married resident of Bévilard making 150,000 CHF was 13.6%, while an unmarried resident's rate was 20%. For comparison, the average rate for the entire canton in 2006 was 13.9% and the nationwide rate was 11.6%. In 2009 there were a total of 744 tax payers in the municipality. Of that total, 209 made over 75,000 CHF per year. There were 8 people who made between 15,000 and 20,000 per year. The average income of the over 75,000 CHF group in Bévilard was 108,391 CHF, while the average across all of Switzerland was 130,478 CHF.

== Religion ==
From the 2000 census, 743 or 44.6% belonged to the Swiss Reformed Church, while 484 or 29.1% were Roman Catholic. Of the rest of the population, there were 14 members of an Orthodox church (or about 0.84% of the population), there was 1 individual who belongs to the Christian Catholic Church, and there were 484 individuals (or about 29.05% of the population) who belonged to another Christian church. There were 41 (or about 2.46% of the population) who were Islamic. There were 2 individuals who belonged to another church. 98 (or about 5.88% of the population) belonged to no church, are agnostic or atheist, and 41 individuals (or about 2.46% of the population) did not answer the question.

== Education ==
In Bévilard about 49.4% of the population have completed non-mandatory upper secondary education, and 12.8% have completed additional higher education (either university or a Fachhochschule). Of the 132 who had completed some form of tertiary schooling listed in the census, 70.5% were Swiss men, 15.2% were Swiss women, 11.4% were non-Swiss men.

The Canton of Bern school system provides one year of non-obligatory Kindergarten, followed by six years of Primary school. This is followed by three years of obligatory lower Secondary school where the students are separated according to ability and aptitude. Following the lower Secondary students may attend additional schooling or they may enter an apprenticeship.

During the 2011-12 school year, there were a total of 131 students attending classes in Bévilard. There were 2 kindergarten classes with a total of 31 students in the municipality. Of the kindergarten students, 6.5% were permanent or temporary residents of Switzerland (not citizens) and 3.2% have a different mother language than the classroom language. The municipality had 6 primary classes and 100 students. Of the primary students, 21.0% were permanent or temporary residents of Switzerland (not citizens) and 14.0% have a different mother language than the classroom language.

As of 2000, there were a total of 180 students attending any school in the municipality. Of those, 175 both lived and attended school in the municipality, while 5 students came from another municipality. During the same year, 105 residents attended schools outside the municipality.
