= Champoz =

- Municipality
- Flag Coat of arms
- Location of Champoz
- Location within Switzerland Location within Canton of Bern
- Coordinates: 47°16′N 7°18′E
- Country: Switzerland
- Canton: Bern
- District: Jura bernois

Government
  - Mayor: Maire; Wesley Mercerat

Area
  - Total: 7.11 km^{2} (2.75 sq mi)
- Elevation: 849 m (2,785 ft)

Population (Dec 2011)
  - Total: 157
  - Density: 22.1/km^{2} (57.2/sq mi)
- Time zone: UTC+01:00 (CET)
  - Summer (DST): UTC+02:00 (CEST)
- Postal code: 2735
- SFOS number: 683
- ISO 3166 code: CH-BE
- Surrounded by: Bévilard, Malleray, Souboz, Perrefitte, Moutier, Court, Sorvilier
- Website: http://www.champoz.ch SFSO statistics

Champoz (French pronunciation: [ʃɑ̃po]) is a municipality in the Jura bernois administrative district in the canton of Bern in Switzerland. It is located in the French-speaking part of the canton in the Jura Mountains.

== History ==
Champoz was first mentioned in 1365 as Champo.

The Roman army built an observation post on the mountainside near the present day village. Very little is known about the early history of the village, but throughout its history it was owned by the bailiff of Malleray who was under the authority of the provost of Moutier-Grandval Abbey. In 1499, during the Swabian War, Imperial troops destroyed the village. Both before and after the Protestant Reformation in 1531 it was part of the parish of Chalières. This changed in 1746 when it became part of the Bévilard parish.

After the 1797 French victory and the Treaty of Campo Formio, Champoz became part of the French Département of Mont-Terrible. Three years later, in 1800 it became part of the Département of Haut-Rhin. After Napoleon's defeat and the Congress of Vienna, Champoz was assigned to the Canton of Bern in 1815.

The village is located in the mountains above the Tavannes valley. Because of its location, during the 19th century the roads, railroads and industrialization of the valley bypassed Champoz. Today, many residents still work in agriculture while others commute to jobs in the Tavannes valley.

== Geography ==
Aerial view (1958)

Champoz has an area of 7.17 km^{2} (2.77 sq mi). As of 2012, a total of 3.34 km^{2} (1.29 mi^{2}) or 46.5% is used for agricultural purposes, while 3.63 km^{2} (1.40 mi^{2}) or 50.6% is forested. Of the rest of the land, 0.21 km^{2} (0.081 mi^{2}) or 2.9% is settled (buildings or roads), 0.01 km^{2} (2.5 acres) or 0.1% is either rivers or lakes.

During the same year, housing and buildings made up 1.4% and transportation infrastructure made up 1.4%. Out of the forested land, 44.0% of the total land area is heavily forested and 6.5% is covered with orchards or small clusters of trees. Of the agricultural land, 11.4% is used for growing crops and 15.9% is pastures and 18.7% is used for alpine pastures. All the water in the municipality is in lakes.

The municipality is located in the Moutier district, on the southern slope of Moron mountain. It consists of the linear village of Champoz and part of the hamlet of Le Petit-Champoz.

On 31 December 2009 District de Moutier, the municipality's former district, was dissolved. On the following day, 1 January 2010, it joined the newly created Arrondissement administratif Jura bernois.

== Coat of arms ==
The blazon of the municipal coat of arms is Or issuant from a Mount Vert a Gentian Azure slipped and leaved of the second and on a Chief Gules fimbriated Vert a Semi Sun issuant Argent.

== Demographics ==
Champoz has a population (as of December 2020) of 174. As of 2010, 0.7% of the population are resident foreign nationals. Over the last 10 years (2001-2011) the population has changed at a rate of 2.6%. Migration accounted for 5.2%, while births and deaths accounted for 0.7%.

Most of the population (as of 2000) speaks French (137 or 90.7%) as their first language with the rest speaking German.

As of 2008, the population was 49.7% male and 50.3% female. The population was made up of 76 Swiss men (49.7% of the population) and (0.0%) non-Swiss men. There were 76 Swiss women (49.7%) and 1 (0.7%) non-Swiss women. Of the population in the municipality, 71 or about 47.0% were born in Champoz and lived there in 2000. There were 63 or 41.7% who were born in the same canton, while 12 or 7.9% were born somewhere else in Switzerland, and 5 or 3.3% were born outside of Switzerland.

As of 2011, children and teenagers (0–19 years old) make up 25.5% of the population, while adults (20–64 years old) make up 61.8% and seniors (over 64 years old) make up 12.7%.

As of 2000, there were 72 people who were single and never married in the municipality. There were 74 married individuals, 3 widows or widowers and 2 individuals who are divorced.

As of 2010, there were 10 households that consist of only one person and 10 households with five or more people. In 2000, a total of 46 apartments (66.7% of the total) were permanently occupied, while 18 apartments (26.1%) were seasonally occupied and 5 apartments (7.2%) were empty. The vacancy rate for the municipality, in 2012, was 2.35%.

The historical population is given in the following chart:

== Sights ==
The entire village of Champoz is designated as part of the Inventory of Swiss Heritage Sites.

== Politics ==
In the 2011 federal election the most popular party was the Swiss People's Party (SVP) which received 60.8% of the vote. The next three most popular parties were the Conservative Democratic Party (BDP) (8.6%), the Evangelical People's Party (EVP) (8%) and the Christian Social Party (CSP) (8%). In the federal election, a total of 80 votes were cast, and the voter turnout was 64.0%.

== Economy ==
As of 2011, Champoz had an unemployment rate of 1.79%. As of 2008, there were a total of 41 people employed in the municipality. Of these, there were 32 people employed in the primary economic sector and about 12 businesses involved in this sector. 3 people were employed in the secondary sector and there were 2 businesses in this sector. 6 people were employed in the tertiary sector, with 3 businesses in this sector. There were 65 residents of the municipality who were employed in some capacity, of which females made up 35.4% of the workforce.

In 2008 there were a total of 30 full-time equivalent jobs. The number of jobs in the primary sector was 21, all of which were in agriculture. The number of jobs in the secondary sector was 3 of which 1 was in manufacturing and 2 (66.7%) were in construction. The number of jobs in the tertiary sector was 6. In the tertiary sector; 2 or 33.3% were in wholesale or retail sales or the repair of motor vehicles, 2 or 33.3% were in a hotel or restaurant, 2 or 33.3% were in education.

In 2000, there were 11 workers who commuted into the municipality and 34 workers who commuted away. The municipality is a net exporter of workers, with about 3.1 workers leaving the municipality for every one entering. A total of 31 workers (73.8% of the 42 total workers in the municipality) both lived and worked in Champoz. Of the working population, 1.5% used public transportation to get to work, and 49.2% used a private car.

In 2011 the average local and cantonal tax rate on a married resident of Champoz making 150,000 CHF was 12.4%, while an unmarried resident's rate was 18.2%. For comparison, the average rate for the entire canton in 2006 was 13.9% and the nationwide rate was 11.6%. In 2009 there were a total of 56 tax payers in the municipality. Of that total, 20 made over 75,000 CHF per year. There was one person who made between 15,000 and 20,000 per year. The average income of the over 75,000 CHF group in Champoz was 133,815 CHF, while the average across all of Switzerland was 130,478 CHF.

== Religion ==
From the 2000 census, 75 or 49.7% belonged to the Swiss Reformed Church, while 8 or 5.3% were Roman Catholic. Of the rest of the population, there were 85 individuals (or about 56.29% of the population) who belonged to another Christian church. There were 1 individual who belonged to another church. 8 (or about 5.30% of the population) belonged to no church, are agnostic or atheist, and 16 individuals (or about 10.60% of the population) did not answer the question.

== Education ==
In Champoz about 64.5% of the population have completed non-mandatory upper secondary education, and 7.9% have completed additional higher education (either university or a Fachhochschule). Of the 7 who had completed some form of tertiary schooling listed in the census, 71.4% were Swiss men, 28.6% were Swiss women.

The Canton of Bern school system provides one year of non-obligatory Kindergarten, followed by six years of Primary school. This is followed by three years of obligatory lower Secondary school where the students are separated according to ability and aptitude. Following the lower Secondary students may attend additional schooling or they may enter an apprenticeship.

During the 2011–12 school year, there were a total of 12 students attending classes in Champoz. There were no kindergarten classes in the municipality. The municipality had one primary class and 12 students. Of the primary students, 8.3% have a different mother language than the classroom language.

As of 2000, there were a total of 38 students attending any school in the municipality. Of those, 27 both lived and attended school in the municipality, while 11 students came from another municipality. During the same year, 15 residents attended schools outside the municipality.
