= Birsköpfli =

Coordinates: 47.557°N 7.617°E

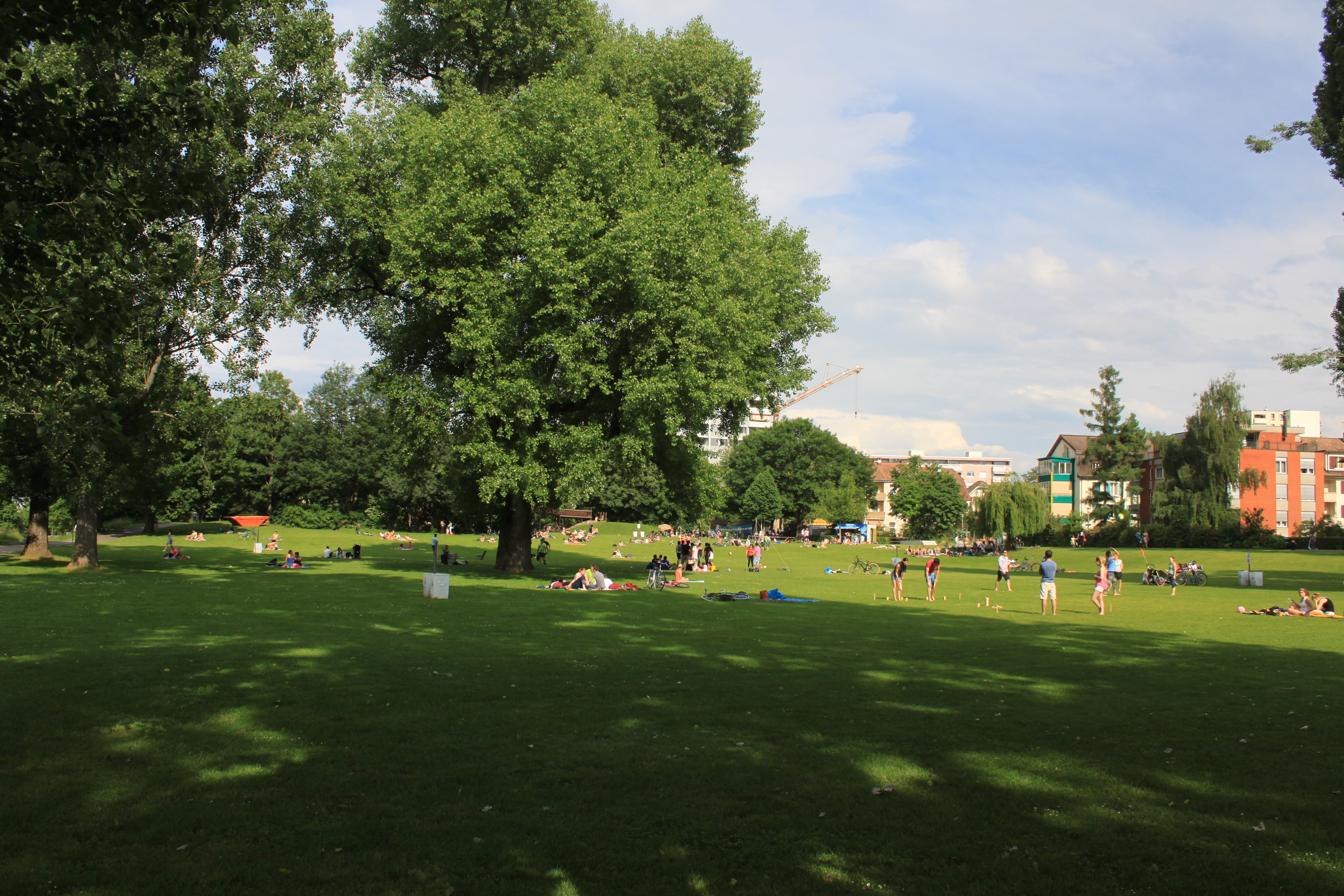
Birsköpfli

The Birsköpfli (also called Birskopf, German for Birs River Head) is a leisure and bathing area in the Swiss city of Basel and its neighbouring municipality Birsfelden. It is located at the confluence of the Birs river with the Rhine river.

Geographically, the Birsköpfli only means the area bounded by the Birs and the Rhine in the borough Breite; other boundaries are the Blackwood Bridge and the main road to Birsfelden. Along the Birs riverbanks there is a park with green meadows and a restaurant, the rest of the area is inhabited by allotments.

In common parlance the term "Birsköpfli" additionally includes the green meadows at the Rhine riverbanks in Birsfelden just east of the actual Birsköpfli. Due to the closeness to the city, the attractive location and the various leisure and sports possibilities the area is highly popular among locals.

== Birskopf Bridge ==
The Birskopf bridge (Birskopfsteg) connects the meadows at both Birs riverbanks and was constructed in 1963 as the first cable-stayed bridge in Switzerland. In 2007 the bridge was demolished due to a broken cable. A makeshift wooden bridge was built in 2008, and a permanent new bridge was opened in April 2012.
