= Moron (mountain) =

Mountain in Switzerland

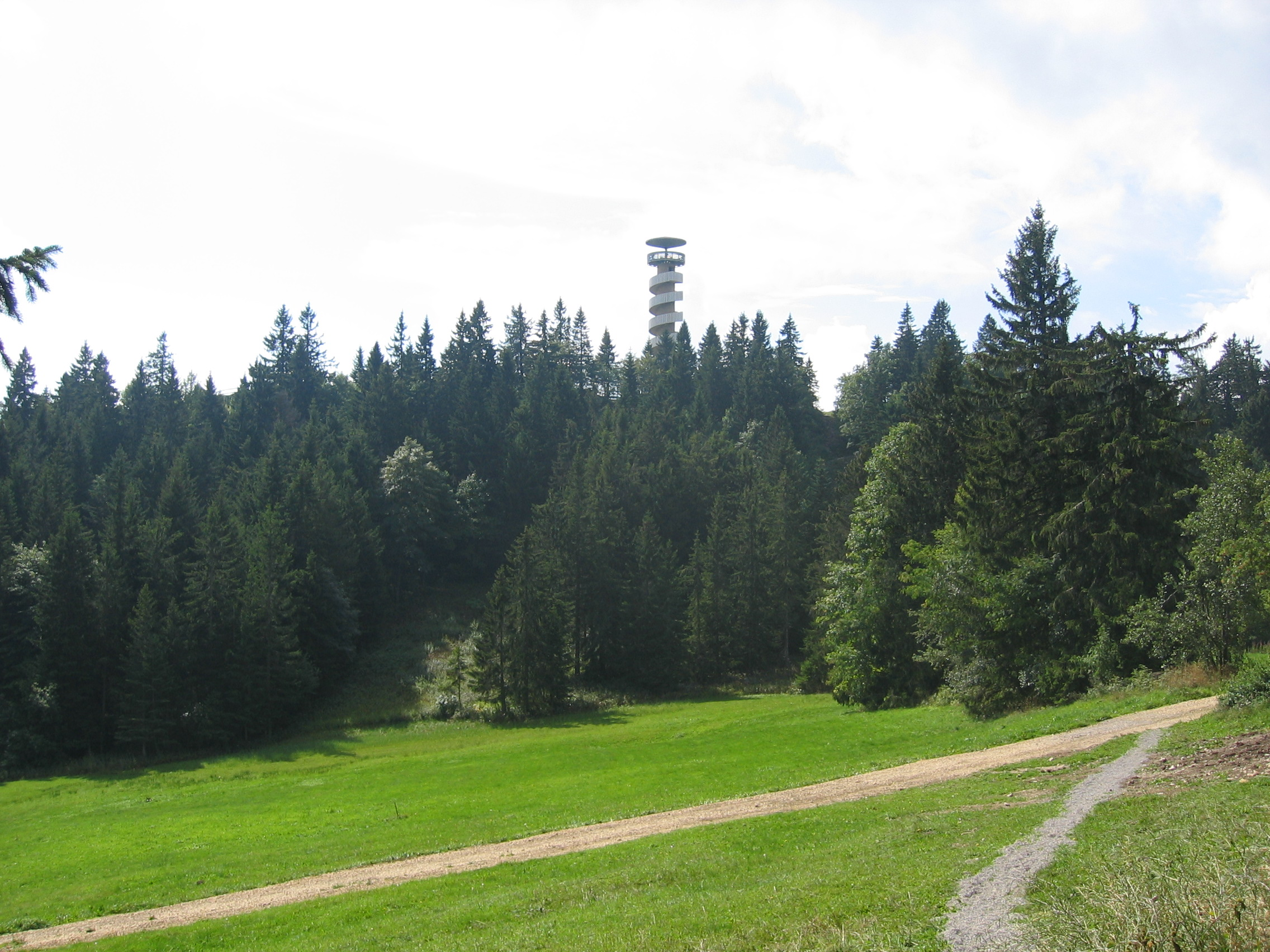
- View near the summit

Highest point
- Elevation: 1,337 m (4,386 ft)
- Prominence: 393 m (1,289 ft)
- Parent peak: Chasseral
- Coordinates: 47°15′45″N 7°15′49″E

Geography
- Location within Switzerland
- Location: Bern, Switzerland
- Parent range: Jura Mountains

The Moron (1,337 m) is a mountain of the Jura, located north of Malleray in the canton of Bern.

East of the summit is located a 30-metre-high (98 ft) observation tower designed by Mario Botta.
