= Sandoz (watch company) =

Swiss watch manufacturer

Sandoz is a Swiss watch brand, originally established in the late 19th century by Henri Sandoz near Tavannes, Switzerland. There are now many variations of the Sandoz name which are used by at least four different companies around the world.

== History ==
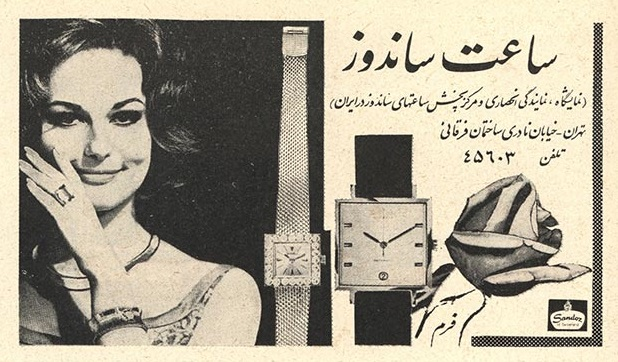
A 1968 magazine ad of Sandoz watches in Persian, Zan-e Rooz.

Henri Frédéric Sandoz (sometimes Frédéric Henri Sandoz), born in 1851, was a self-made man of Le Locle who in the 1870s founded Henri Sandoz & Cie., later producing complicated watches under the name of Cyma. In 1890, in partnership with two families named Schwob, Sandoz established a watchmaking firm at Malleray, near Tavannes, in the French-speaking Bernese Jura of Switzerland. Their new business was known as Tavannes Watch Co. By the time of the death of Sandoz on 18 March 1913, many watches were made under the name of Henri Sandoz & Fils. The enterprise occupied a 'model factory' employing one thousand workers and producing 2,500 watches a day. Sandoz was reported to have a paternalistic policy towards his workforce, exercising a fierce social control.

Other names used by the Tavannes company at various times include Tavannes-Cyma, Bijou Watch Co., Tacy Watch Co., and Lisca. After the death of Sandoz, the company he founded went on growing. By 1938, it was manufacturing four thousand items a day.

== Present day ==
Since 1971 the Sandoz brand name has been split into four main areas of production, due to its licences being leased or sold. This has led to four separate brands, Sandoz Singapore, Sandoz Hong Kong, Sandoz Swiss, and Sandoz Spain (Munreco). All of these produce watches under the Sandoz name, but each company has its own range of products. Sandoz Swiss manufactures high quality watches, while Sandoz Hong Kong and Sandoz Singapore manufacture cheaper watches of lower quality. Sandoz Hong Kong products are assembled in Hong Kong using Swiss movements from ETA SA.

== See also ==
- List of watch manufacturers
