= Malleray =

- Former municipality
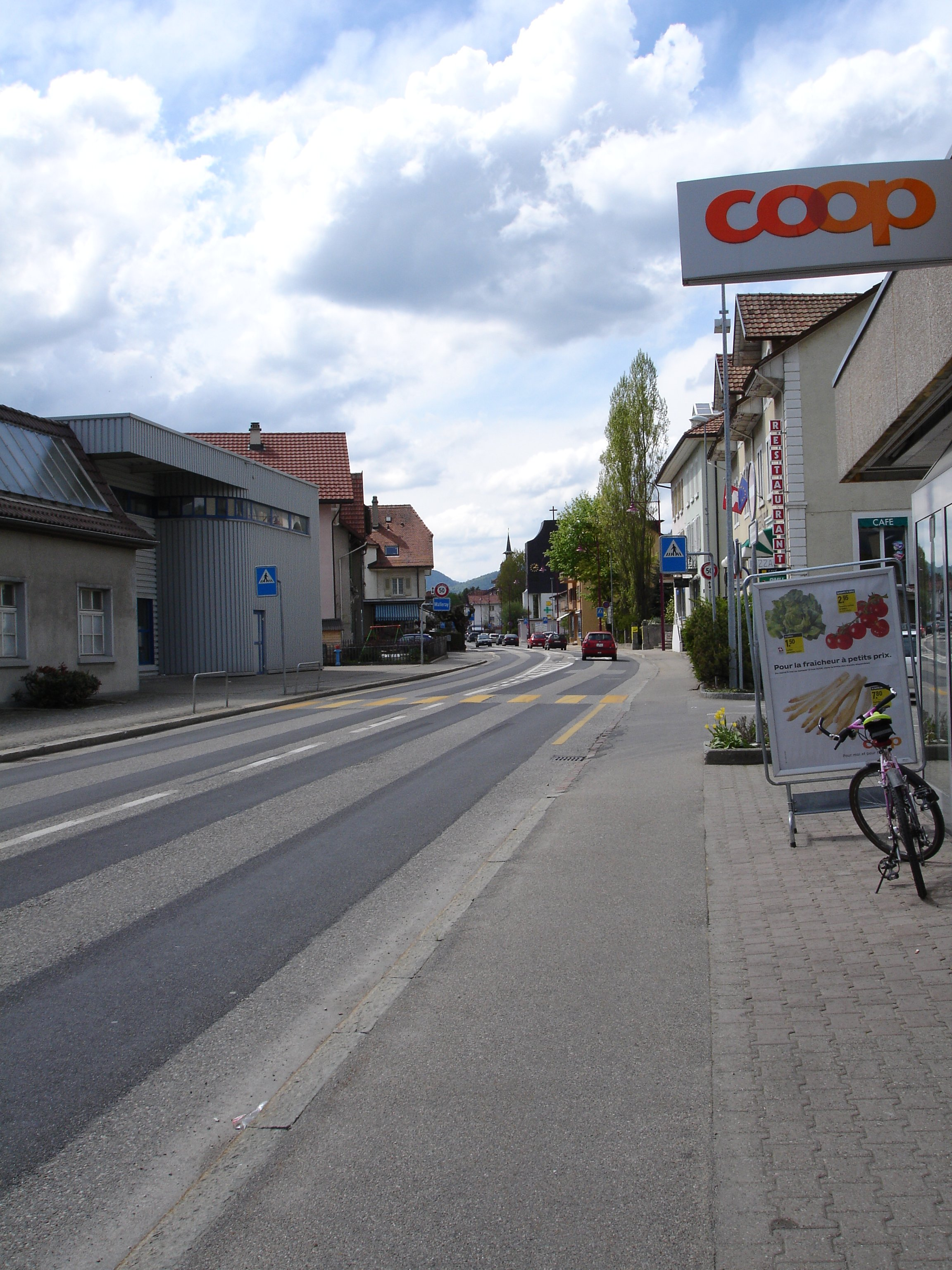
- Malleray village

- Flag Coat of arms
- Location of Malleray
- Location within Switzerland Location within Canton of Bern
- Coordinates: 47°14′N 7°16′E
- Country: Switzerland
- Canton: Bern
- District: Jura bernois

Government
  - Mayor: Maire

Area
  - Total: 10.35 km^{2} (4.00 sq mi)
- Elevation: 699 m (2,293 ft)

Population (Dec 2011)
  - Total: 1,970
  - Density: 190/km^{2} (493/sq mi)
- Time zone: UTC+01:00 (CET)
  - Summer (DST): UTC+02:00 (CEST)
- Postal code: 2735
- SFOS number: 697
- ISO 3166 code: CH-BE
- Surrounded by: Reconvilier, Loveresse, Pontenet, Souboz, Champoz, Bévilard, Péry
- Twin towns: Tar (Hungary)
- Website: www.valbirse.ch

Malleray is a municipality in the Jura bernois administrative district in the canton of Bern in Switzerland. It is located in the French-speaking Bernese Jura (Jura Bernois). On 1 January 2015 the former municipalities of Bévilard, Malleray and Pontenet merged to form the new municipality of Valbirse.

== History ==
Aerial view (1958)

Malleray is first mentioned in 1179 as Malareia. The municipality was formerly known by its German name Mallaraya, however, that name is no longer used.

Very little is known about the early history of the village. In 1367, the Prince-Bishop of Basel, Johann von Vienne, sent troops to try to force Biel to break a burgrecht treaty that they had entered into with the city of Bern. At Malleray, the Basel troops encountered and were defeated by an army from Solothurn that was marching to support Bern against Basel. The noble de Malleray family appear in historic records during the 14th and 15th centuries. They may have been a cadet line of the local Tavannes family. Over the following centuries, the provost of Moutier-Grandval Abbey gradually acquired most of the rights and lands in the village. After the secularization of the Abbey following the adoption of the Protestant Reformation in Bern, during the end of the 16th century Malleray became part of a bailiwick under the diocese of Basel. After the 1797 French victory and the Treaty of Campo Formio, Malleray became part of the French Département of Mont-Terrible. Three years later, in 1800 it became part of the Département of Haut-Rhin. After Napoleon's defeat and the Congress of Vienna, Malleray was assigned to the Canton of Bern in 1815.

The watch making industry started in the village in 1846 and began to change it from an agrarian village into an industrial town. The construction of the Tavannes-Moutier railroad in 1874-77 increased the rate of change. The population grew rapidly as watch factory jobs brought new residents. Even today, about half of all jobs in Malleray are in precision industries.

== Geography ==
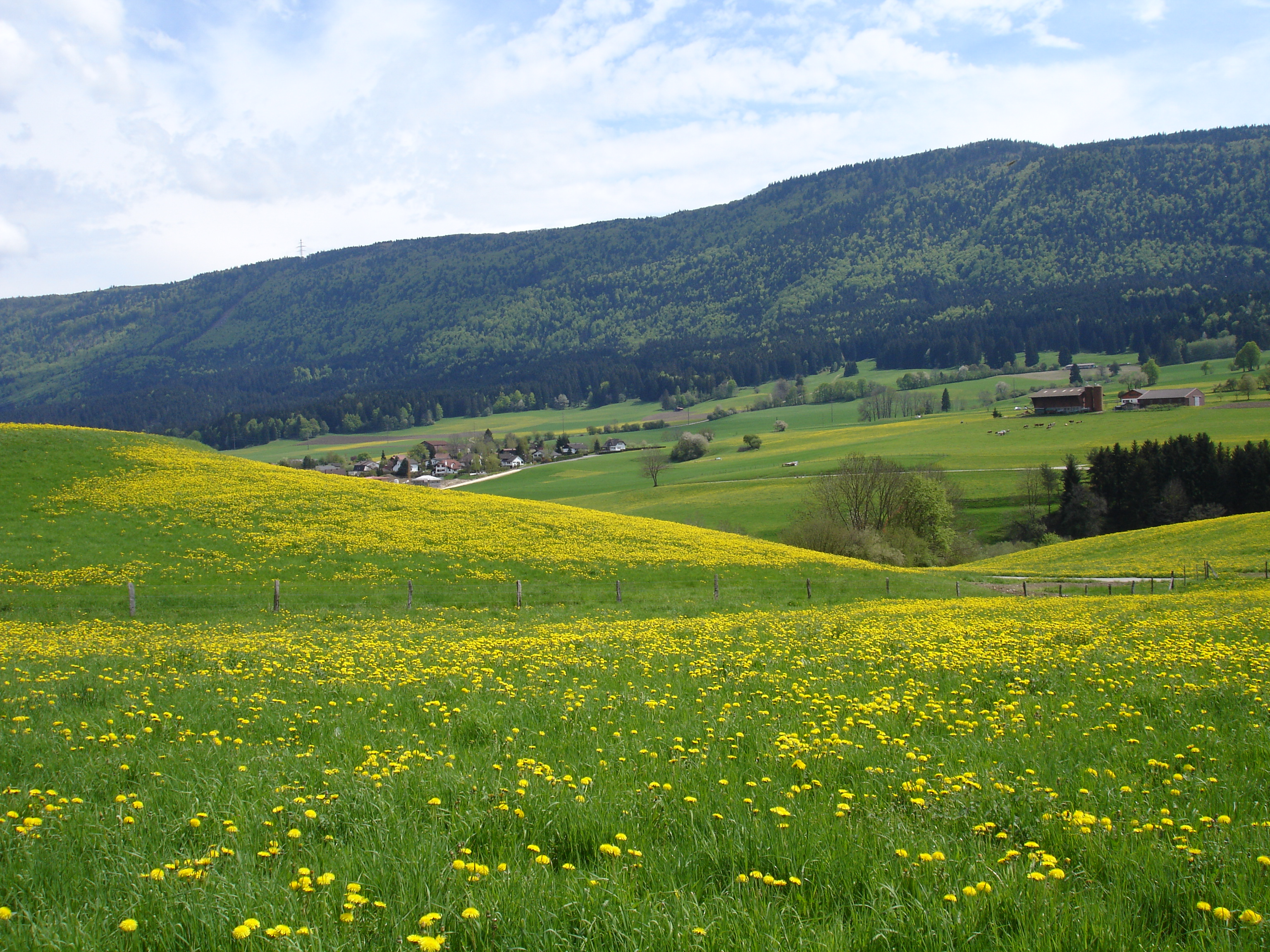
Malleray valley near the municipality

Before the merger, Malleray had a total area of 10.2 km^{2} (3.9 mi^{2}). As of 2012, a total of 4.88 km^{2} (1.88 mi^{2}) or 47.6% is used for agricultural purposes, while 4.37 km^{2} (1.69 mi^{2}) or 42.6% is forested. Of the rest of the land, 0.93 km^{2} (0.36 mi^{2}) or 9.1% is settled (buildings or roads), 0.02 km^{2} (4.9 acres) or 0.2% is either rivers or lakes.

During the same year, housing and buildings made up 5.5% and transportation infrastructure made up 2.5%. Out of the forested land, 37.6% of the total land area is heavily forested and 5.0% is covered with orchards or small clusters of trees. Of the agricultural land, 12.8% is used for growing crops and 11.7% is pastures and 22.8% is used for alpine pastures. All the water in the municipality is flowing water.

The municipality is located in the Vallée de Tavannes (Tavannes Valley) on the banks of the Birs River.

On 31 December 2009 District de Moutier, the municipality's former district, was dissolved. On the following day, 1 January 2010, it joined the newly created Arrondissement administratif Jura bernois.

== Coat of arms ==
The blazon of the municipal coat of arms is Azure a Rooster hardi crowing Or crested jelloped and langued Gules on a Mount of 3 Coupeaux Argent and in chief sinister a Mullet of Five of the last.

== Demographics ==
Malleray had a population (as of 2013) of 1,972. As of 2010, 18.8% of the population are resident foreign nationals. Over the last 10 years (2001-2011) the population has changed at a rate of 0.2%. Migration accounted for 0.1%, while births and deaths accounted for -0.2%.

Most of the population (as of 2000) speaks French (1,634 or 88.1%) as their first language, German is the second most common (81 or 4.4%) and Italian is the third (58 or 3.1%). There is 1 person who speaks Romansh.

As of 2008, the population was 48.8% male and 51.2% female. The population was made up of 759 Swiss men (38.6% of the population) and 201 (10.2%) non-Swiss men. There were 838 Swiss women (42.6%) and 169 (8.6%) non-Swiss women. Of the population in the municipality, 607 or about 32.7% were born in Malleray and lived there in 2000. There were 643 or 34.7% who were born in the same canton, while 265 or 14.3% were born somewhere else in Switzerland, and 299 or 16.1% were born outside of Switzerland.

As of 2011, children and teenagers (0–19 years old) make up 21.8% of the population, while adults (20–64 years old) make up 57.6% and seniors (over 64 years old) make up 20.7%.

As of 2000, there were 730 people who were single and never married in the municipality. There were 934 married individuals, 112 widows or widowers and 78 individuals who are divorced.

As of 2010, there were 235 households that consist of only one person and 55 households with five or more people. In 2000, a total of 757 apartments (83.4% of the total) were permanently occupied, while 82 apartments (9.0%) were seasonally occupied and 69 apartments (7.6%) were empty. As of 2010, the construction rate of new housing units was 0.5 new units per 1000 residents. The vacancy rate for the municipality, in 2012, was 3.1%. In 2011, single family homes made up 58.3% of the total housing in the municipality.

The historical population is given in the following chart:

== Politics ==
In the 2011 federal election the most popular party was the Swiss People's Party (SVP) which received 33.1% of the vote. The next three most popular parties were the Social Democratic Party (SP) (29.8%), the FDP.The Liberals (11.2%) and the Evangelical People's Party (EVP) (5.2%). In the federal election, a total of 521 votes were cast, and the voter turnout was 39.5%.

== Economy ==
As of 2011, Malleray had an unemployment rate of 2.49%. As of 2008, there were a total of 920 people employed in the municipality. Of these, there were 30 people employed in the primary economic sector and about 13 businesses involved in this sector. 513 people were employed in the secondary sector and there were 28 businesses in this sector. 377 people were employed in the tertiary sector, with 47 businesses in this sector. There were 936 residents of the municipality who were employed in some capacity, of which females made up 41.1% of the workforce.

In 2008 there were a total of 776 full-time equivalent jobs. The number of jobs in the primary sector was 19, all of which were in agriculture. The number of jobs in the secondary sector was 477 of which 399 or (83.6%) were in manufacturing and 77 (16.1%) were in construction. The number of jobs in the tertiary sector was 280. In the tertiary sector; 71 or 25.4% were in wholesale or retail sales or the repair of motor vehicles, 31 or 11.1% were in the movement and storage of goods, 5 or 1.8% were in a hotel or restaurant, 3 or 1.1% were the insurance or financial industry, 17 or 6.1% were technical professionals or scientists, 34 or 12.1% were in education and 97 or 34.6% were in health care.

In 2000, there were 365 workers who commuted into the municipality and 557 workers who commuted away. The municipality is a net exporter of workers, with about 1.5 workers leaving the municipality for every one entering. A total of 378 workers (50.9% of the 743 total workers in the municipality) both lived and worked in Malleray.

Of the working population, 9.6% used public transportation to get to work, and 57.3% used a private car.

In 2011 the average local and cantonal tax rate on a married resident, with two children, of Malleray making 150,000 CHF was 13.6%, while an unmarried resident's rate was 20%. For comparison, the rate for the entire canton in the same year, was 14.2% and 22.0%, while the nationwide rate was 12.3% and 21.1% respectively. In 2009 there were a total of 815 tax payers in the municipality. Of that total, 269 made over 75,000 CHF per year. There were 6 people who made between 15,000 and 20,000 per year. The average income of the over 75,000 CHF group in Malleray was 108,375 CHF, while the average across all of Switzerland was 130,478 CHF. In 2011 a total of 4.0% of the population received direct financial assistance from the government.

== Religion ==
From the 2000 census, 891 or 48.1% belonged to the Swiss Reformed Church, while 588 or 31.7% were Roman Catholic. Of the rest of the population, there were 12 members of an Orthodox church (or about 0.65% of the population), there was 1 individual who belongs to the Christian Catholic Church, and there were 137 individuals (or about 7.39% of the population) who belonged to another Christian church. There were 2 individuals (or about 0.11% of the population) who were Jewish, and 25 (or about 1.35% of the population) who were Islamic. There were 5 individuals who were Buddhist and 3 individuals who belonged to another church. 133 (or about 7.17% of the population) belonged to no church, are agnostic or atheist, and 57 individuals (or about 3.07% of the population) did not answer the question.

== Education ==
In Malleray about 52.6% of the population have completed non-mandatory upper secondary education, and 10.1% have completed additional higher education (either university or a Fachhochschule). Of the 119 who had completed some form of tertiary schooling listed in the census, 64.7% were Swiss men, 24.4% were Swiss women, 8.4% were non-Swiss men.

The Canton of Bern school system provides one year of non-obligatory Kindergarten, followed by six years of Primary school. This is followed by three years of obligatory lower Secondary school where the students are separated according to ability and aptitude. Following the lower Secondary students may attend additional schooling or they may enter an apprenticeship.

During the 2011–12 school year, there were a total of 386 students attending classes in Malleray. There were 3 kindergarten classes with a total of 54 students in the municipality. Of the kindergarten students, 18.5% were permanent or temporary residents of Switzerland (not citizens) and 16.7% have a different mother language than the classroom language. The municipality had 8 primary classes and 133 students. Of the primary students, 13.5% were permanent or temporary residents of Switzerland (not citizens) and 18.0% have a different mother language than the classroom language. During the same year, there were 11 lower secondary classes with a total of 199 students. There were 13.1% who were permanent or temporary residents of Switzerland (not citizens) and 12.6% have a different mother language than the classroom language.

As of 2000, there were a total of 417 students attending any school in the municipality. Of those, 256 both lived and attended school in the municipality, while 161 students came from another municipality. During the same year, 49 residents attended schools outside the municipality.

== See also ==
- Sandoz watches
