= Birs =

River in Switzerland

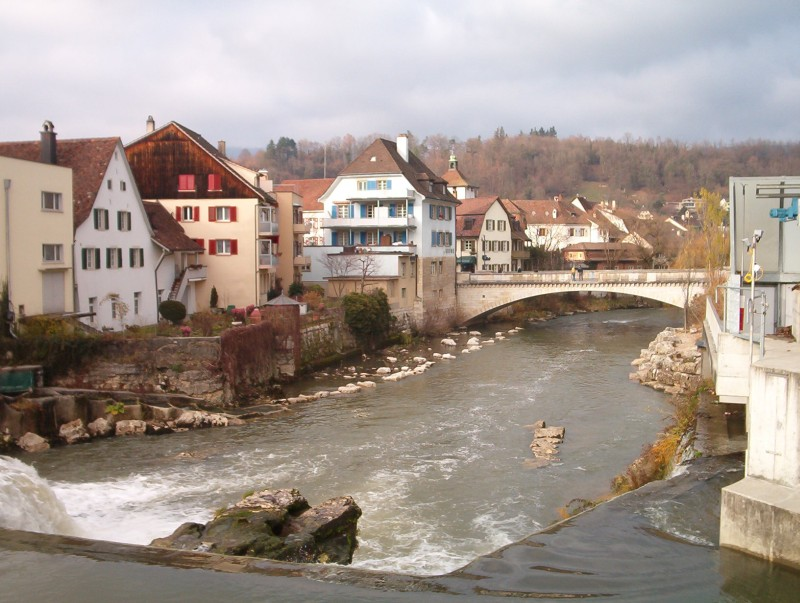
- The Birs in Laufen

Location
- Country: Switzerland

Physical characteristics
- Mouth: Rhine
  - coordinates: 47.5579°N 7.6177°E
- Length: 73 km (45 mi)

Basin features
- Progression: Rhine→ North Sea

The Birs (French: Birse) is a 73-kilometre (45 mi) long river in Switzerland that flows through the Jura Mountains and ends as a tributary to the Rhine between Basel and Birsfelden. It is the most important river of the Swiss Jura.

== Course ==
The Birs has its source in a spring near the Col de Pierre Pertuis at 762 metres (2,500 ft) above sea level a little southwest of Tavannes in the Jura bernois. It starts as a proper river; the large amount of water is the product of an extended underground river system.

The Birs runs through wider valleys (Vallée de Tavannes) and narrow gorges. Near Delémont, the capital of the canton of Jura, it joins the Sorne and the Scheulte. Between Soyhières and Liesberg, it leaves the French-speaking part of Switzerland, enters the canton of Basel-Landschaft and receives the Lützel from the left. In Laufen it forms a waterfall, which was the source of power and of the name of the city.

At the gorge of Angenstein, the river runs into the Birseck, the lowland by Aesch. Between Aesch and Dornach, the Birs is rich in fresh-water crabs, the native species of which are now threatened by the American red crab. Earlier, the Birs was polluted and dammed, but it has largely been restored to its original state.

The Reinacherheide is a wildlife preserve with 83 species of bird.

The mouth of the Birs was hardly settled until the 18th century. Today, the city of Birsfelden stands there. The lower stretches of the Birs form the border between Basel-Stadt and Basel-Landschaft. In 2004, it was restored from a concrete canal to a more natural river. Beavers have even been sighted along the river. The Birs also forms the border between the cities of Basel and Birsfelden. It flows into the Rhine at Birskopf after 73 kilometres (45 mi).

== See also ==
- Birsköpfli
- List of rivers of Switzerland

== Picture gallery ==
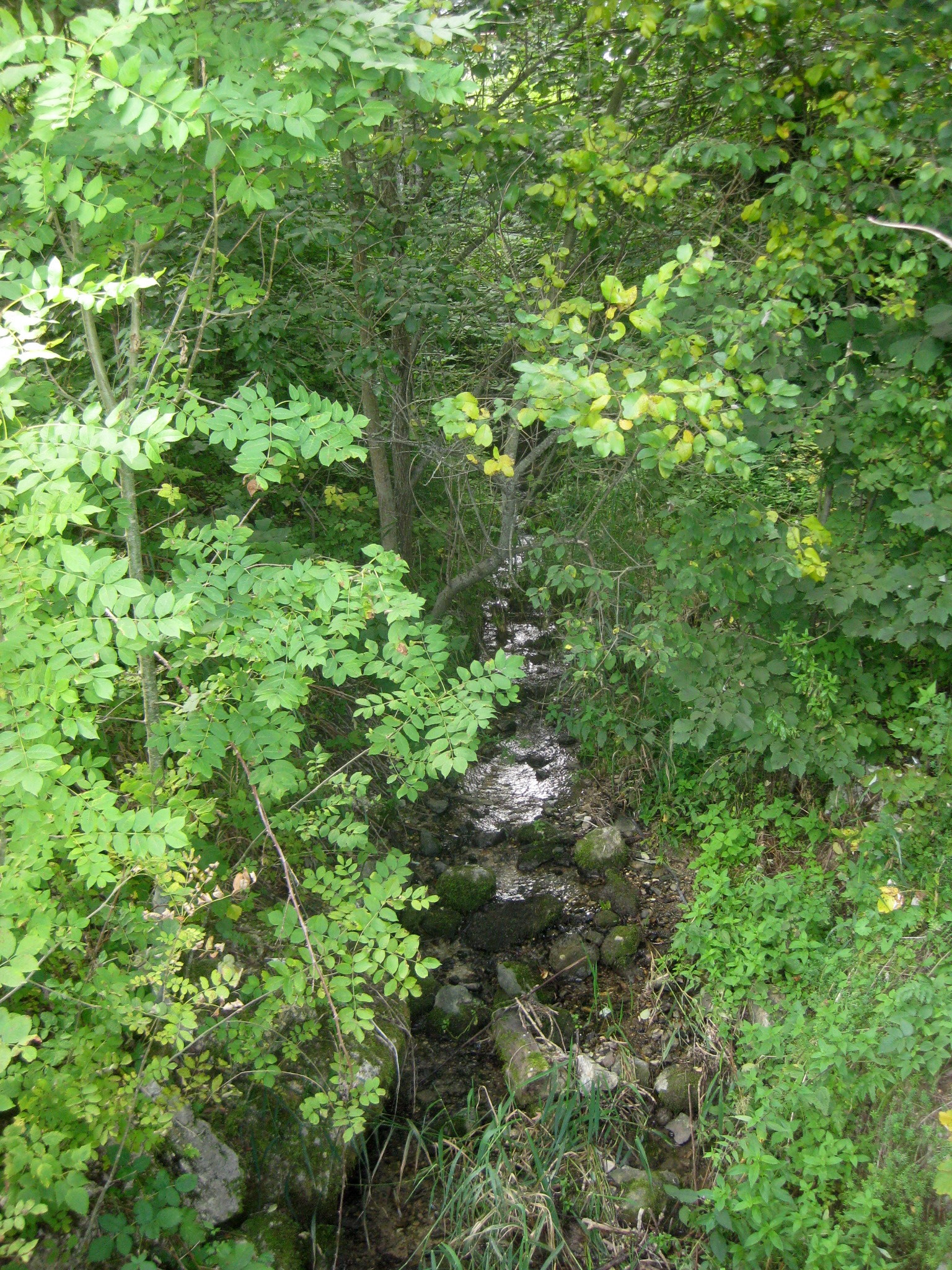
The Birs Source south of Tavannes

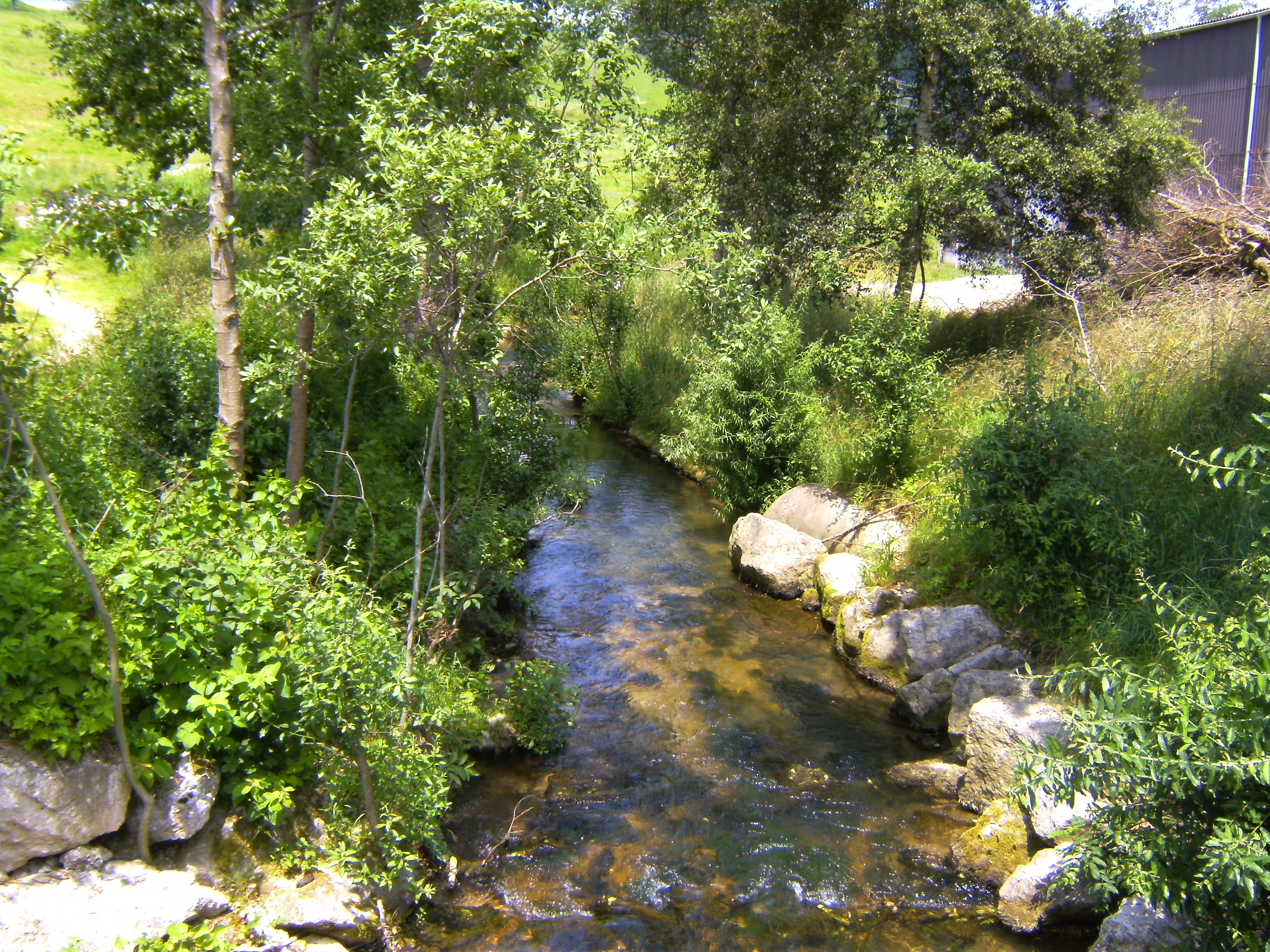
Headwaters of the Birs by Tavannes

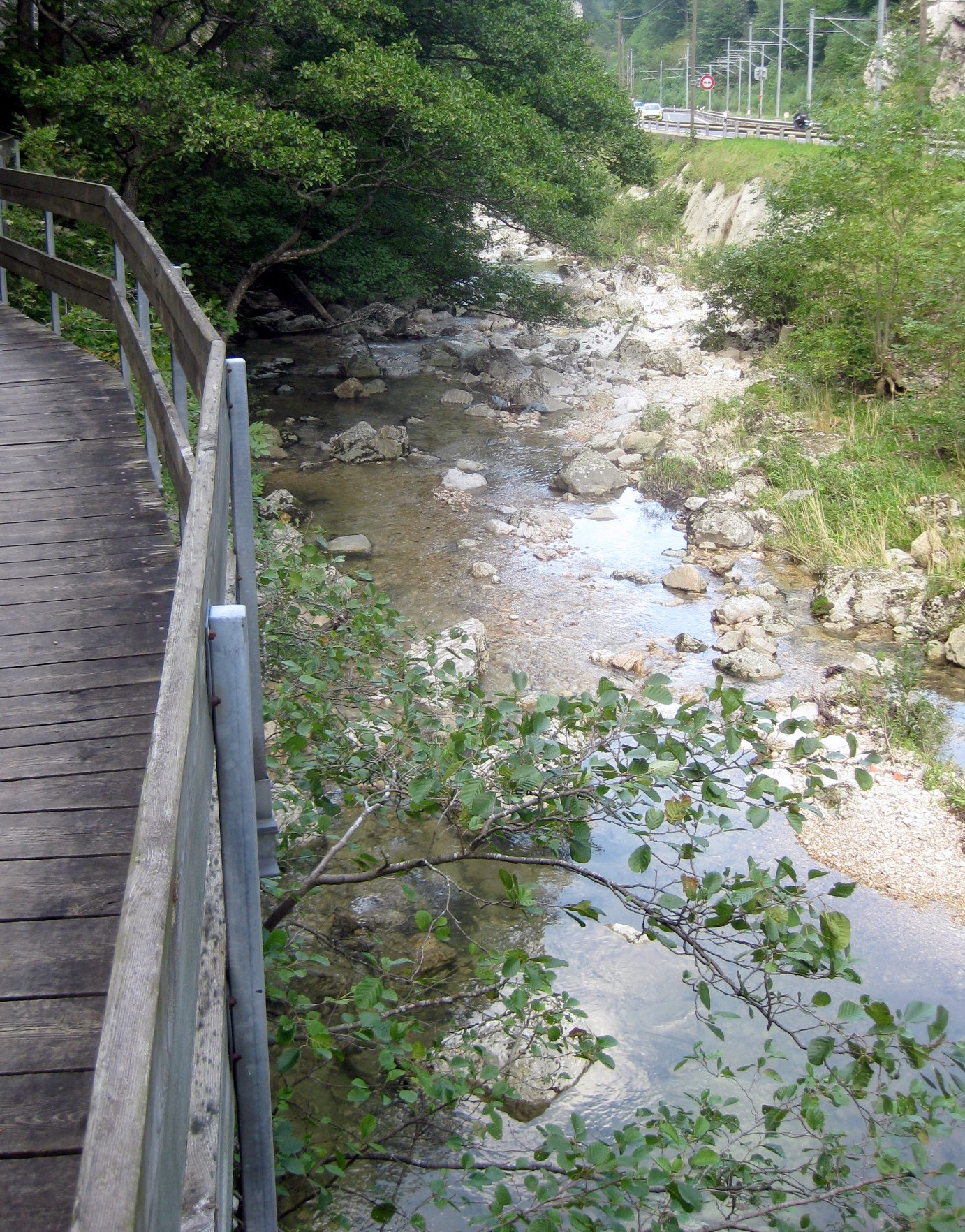
The Birs south of Court (Gorges de Court)

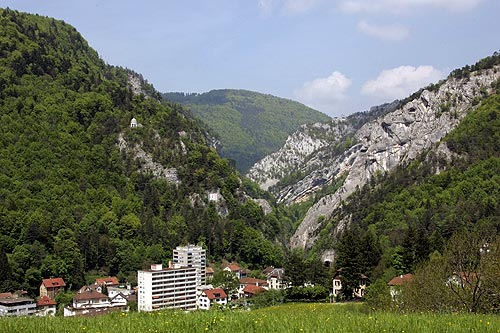
Gorges de Moutier

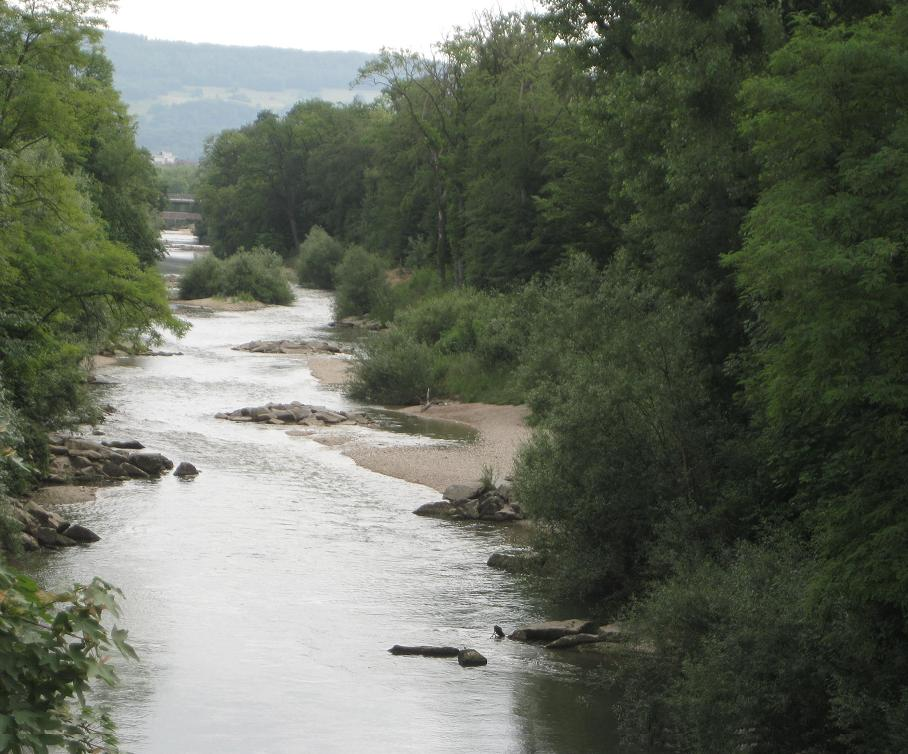
The restored Birs in Münchenstein

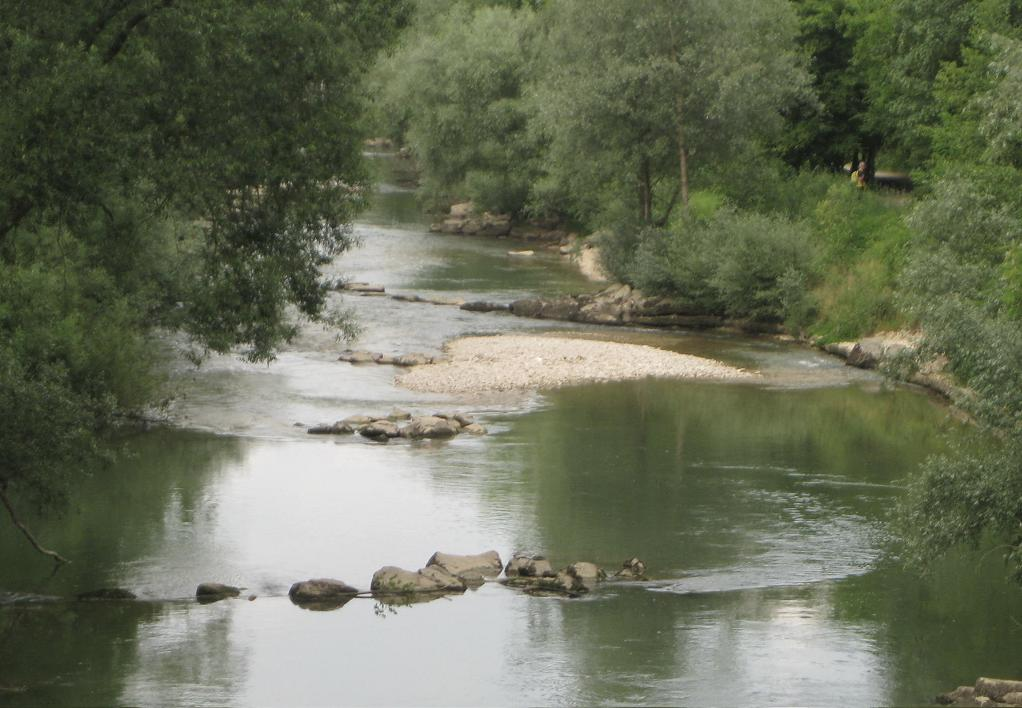
The Birs by the Elektra Birseck Münchenstein

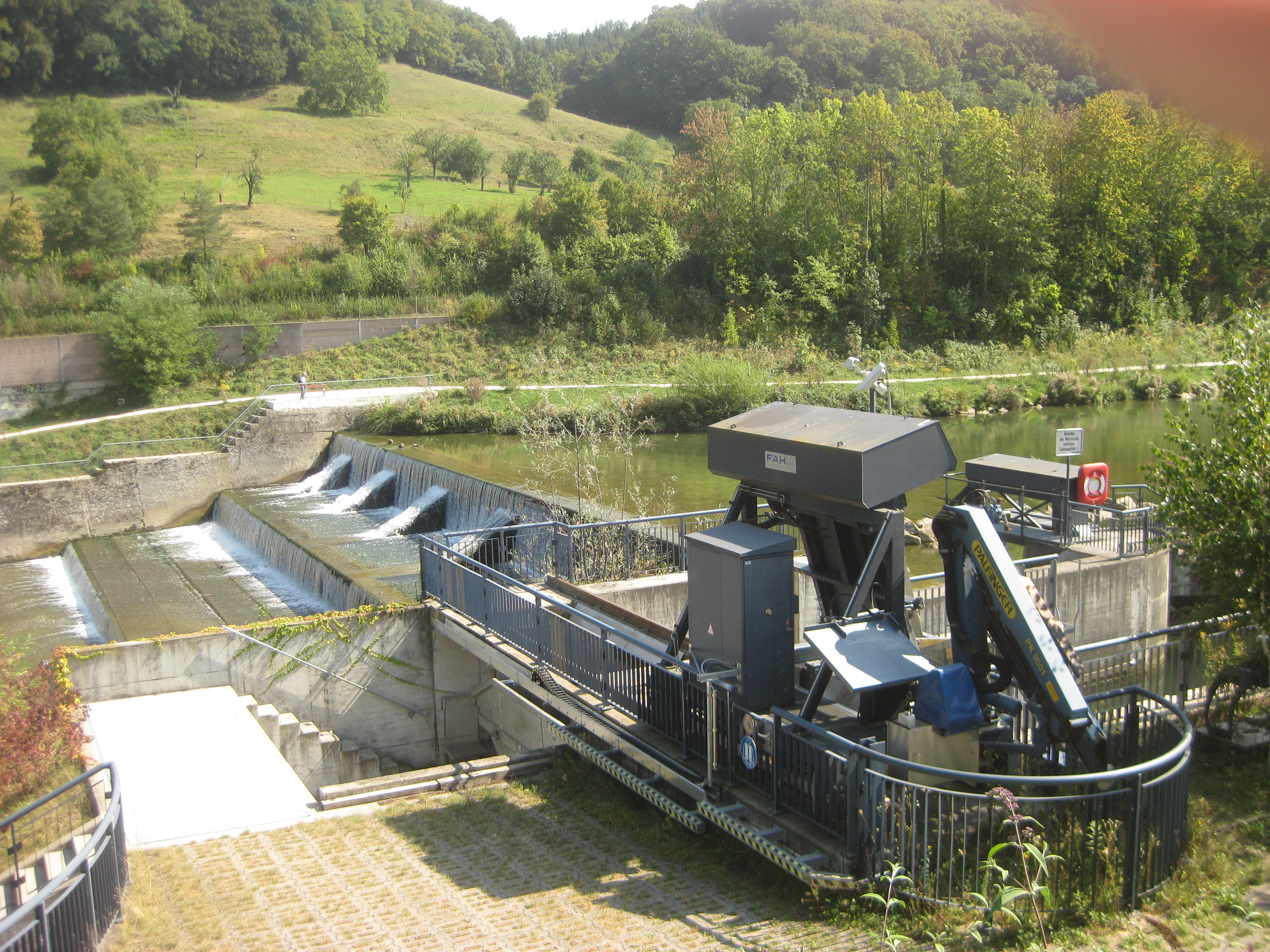
Birs waterfall in the Neue Welt, Münchenstein

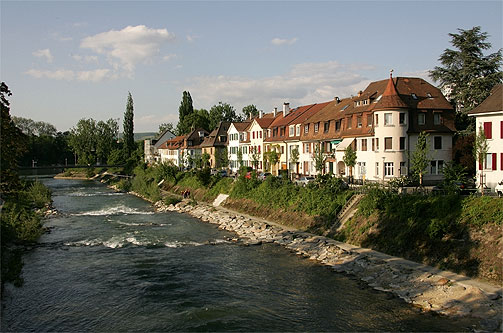
The Birs by Birsfelden

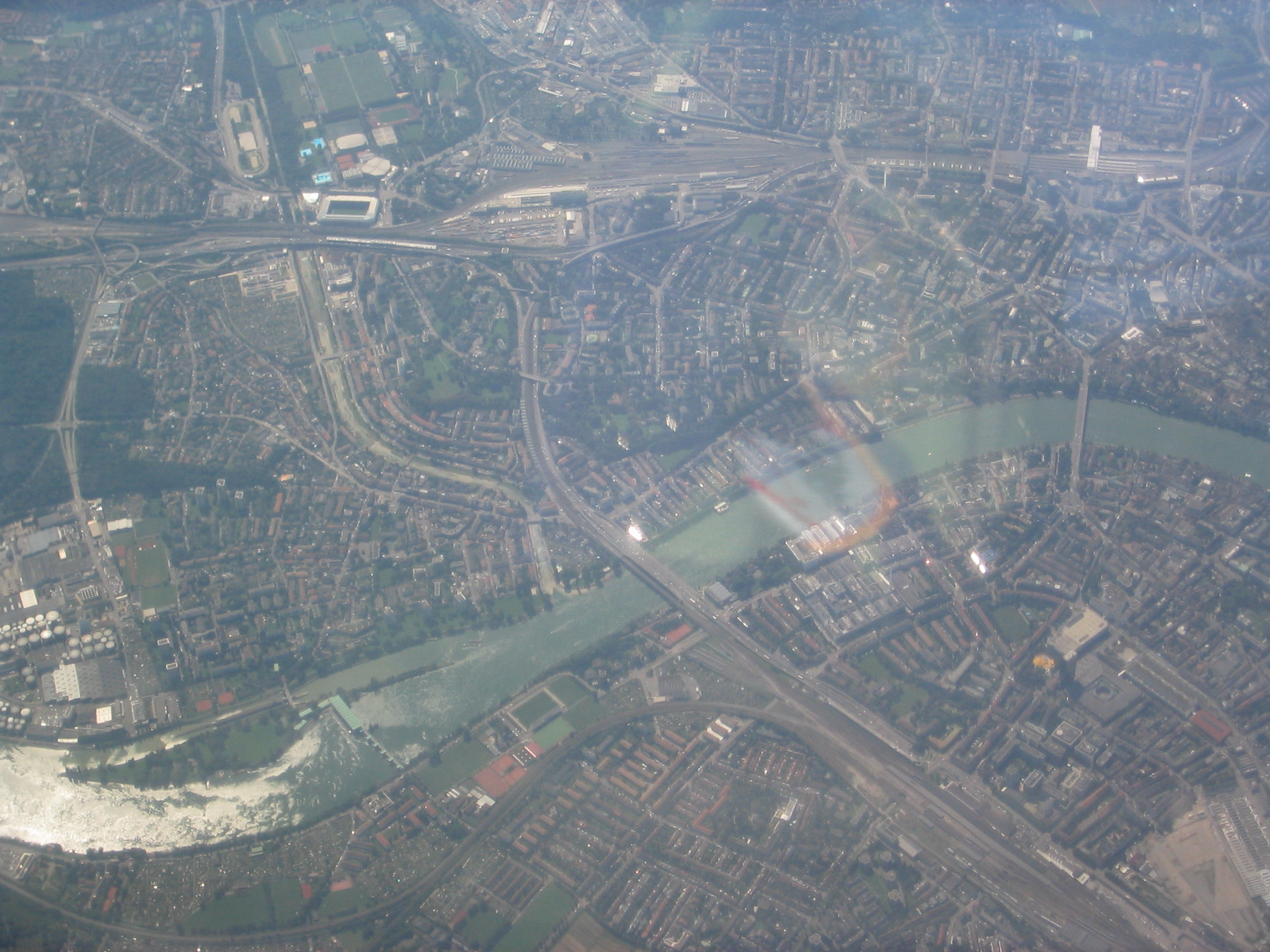
Aerial view of the Rhine, with Birs entering the Rhine
