= Campaigns of 1797 of the French Revolutionary Wars =

The French Revolutionary Wars continued from 1796, with France fighting the First Coalition.

On 14 February, British admiral Jervis met and defeated a Spanish fleet off Portugal at the Battle of Cape St. Vincent. This prevented the Spanish fleet from rendezvousing with the French, removing a threat of invasion to Britain. However, the British fleet was weakened over the rest of the year by the Spithead and Nore mutinies, which kept many ships in port through the summer.

On 22 February, a French invasion force consisting of 1,400 troops from the Légion Noire (The Black Legion) under the command of Irish American Colonel William Tate landed near Fishguard (Wales). They were met by a quickly assembled group of around 500 British reservists, militia, and sailors under the command of John Campbell, 1st Baron Cawdor. After brief clashes with the local civilian population and Lord Cawdor's forces on 23 February, Tate was forced into an unconditional surrender by 24 February.

In Italy, Napoleon's armies were laying siege to Mantua at the beginning of the year, and a second attempt by Austrians under Joseph Alvinczy to raise the siege was driven off at the Battle of Rivoli. Finally, on 2 February, Wurmser surrendered Mantua and 18,000 troops. The Papal forces sued for peace, which was granted at Tolentino on 19 February. Napoleon was now free to attack the Austrian heartland. He advanced directly toward Austria over the Julian Alps, sending Barthélemy Joubert to invade the Tyrol.

Archduke Charles of Austria hurried from the German front to defend Austria, but he was defeated at the Battle of Tagliamento on 16 March, and Napoleon proceeded into Austria, occupying Klagenfurt and preparing for a rendezvous with Joubert in front of Vienna. In Germany, the armies of Hoche and Moreau crossed the Rhine again in April after the previous year's failure. The victories of Napoleon had frightened the Austrians into making peace, and they concluded the Treaty of Leoben in April, ending hostilities. However, his absence from Italy had allowed the outbreak of the revolt known as the Veronese Easters on 17 April, which was put down eight days later.

Although Britain remained at war with France, this effectively ended the First Coalition. Austria later signed the Treaty of Campo Formio, ceding the Austrian Lombardy and the Austrian Netherlands to France and recognizing the French border at the Rhine. Austria and France also partitioned Venice between them.

Preceded by 1796	French Revolutionary Wars; 1797	Succeeded by 1798
