= A4 motorway (Switzerland) =

Motorway in Switzerland

Coordinates: 47.415384°N 8.574615°E

A4

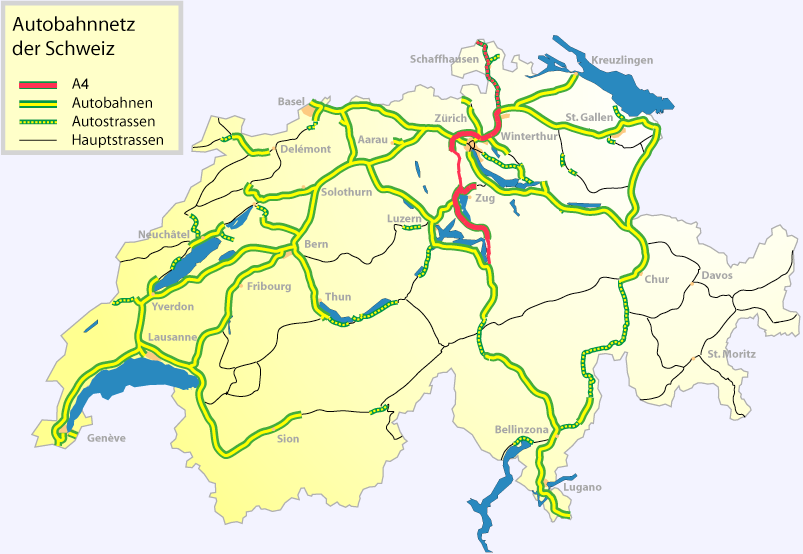
- Location of the A4 within Switzerland

Route information
- Length: 165 km (103 mi)

Location
- Country: Switzerland

Highway system
- Transport in Switzerland; Motorways

The A4 motorway in Switzerland begins from Schaffhausen, in northern Switzerland, and travels southward into central Switzerland.

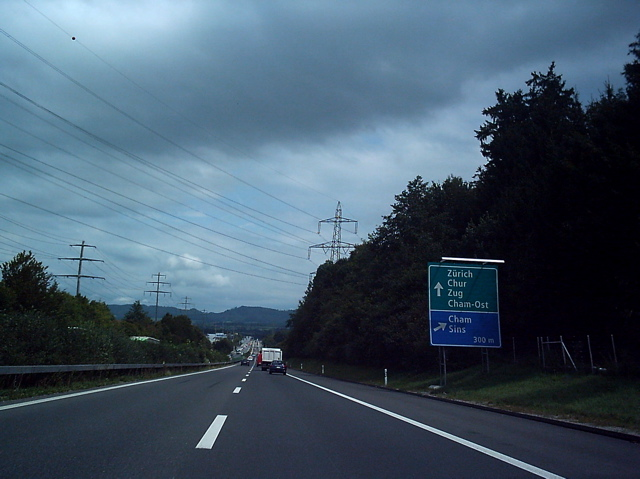
The A4 between Rotkreuz and Zug (August 2004 image)

The general route of A4 is: Bargen - Schaffhausen - Winterthur - Zürich - Central Switzerland.

== Route description ==
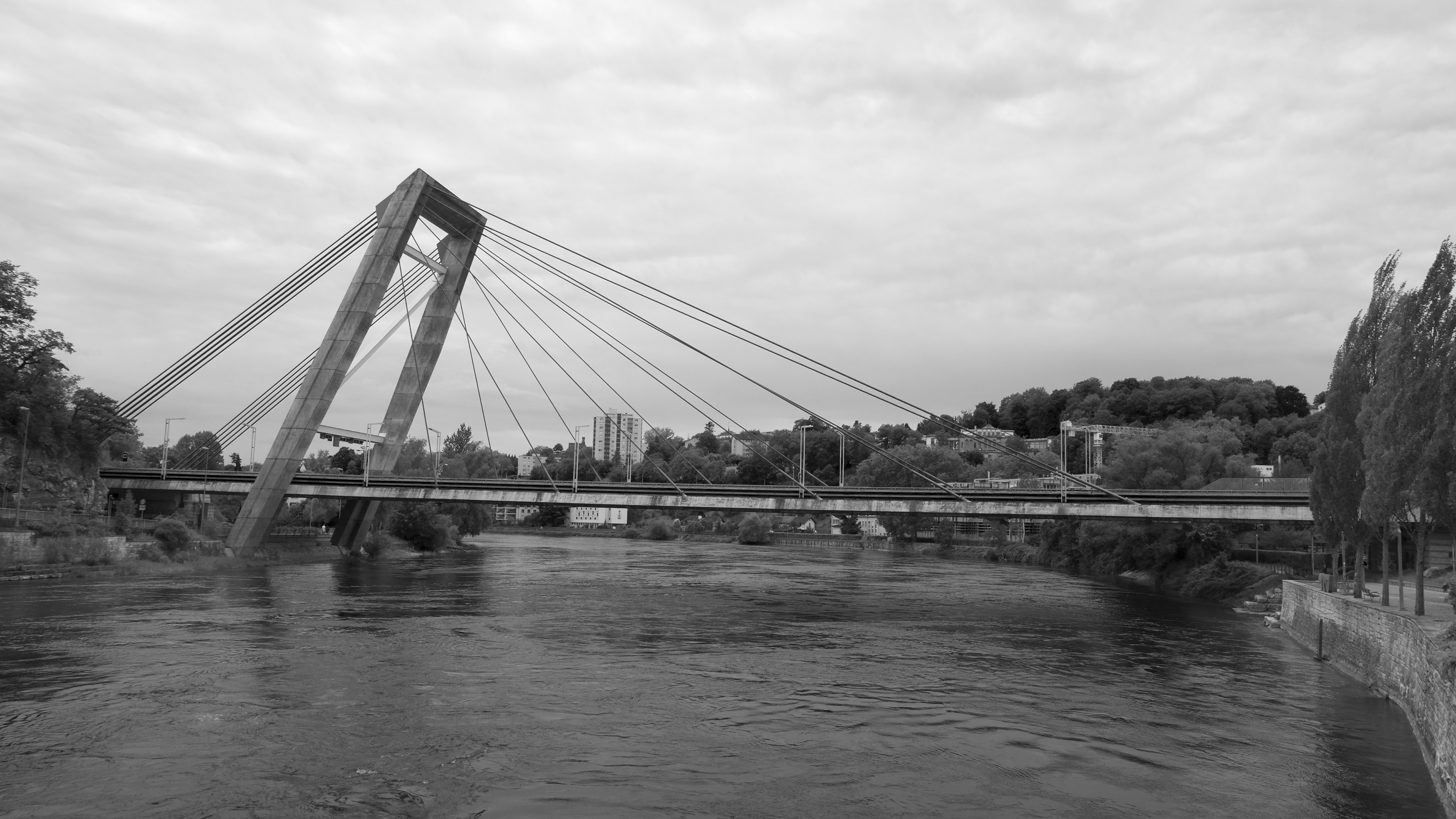
A4 motorway bridge over the Rhine at Schaffhausen.

The A4 starts out as an Autostrasse road at the border crossing Bargen / Neuhaus am Randen, at the border to Germany, crossing a suspension bridge at Schaffhausen over the Rhine, and continues through Zurich's wine country to Winterthur. Between Winterthur and Zurich, the A4 runs together with the developed A1 Autobahn (motorway). From Zurich the branching east from the A4 and the A1 via the so-called Nordring the motorway interchange Limmattal, the motorway runs from where the A4 and A3, since 4 May 2009, joined to the Western Bypass of Zurich; until May 2009 this section ended for the motorway junction Birmensdorf. In November 2009 the opening of the A4 in Knonaueramt between the branches of Zurich West is planned, at Blegi Cham. From Blegi, the A4 goes on to Schwyz and ends as an Autostrasse road at Brunnen.

The continuation of the N4 national road that leads from Brunnen to Altdorf in the canton of Uri, has the status of a third-class national highway, with the physical role of a main road. The tunnel opened in 2005, is again shown as Flüelen Bypass Highway; yet the connection to the A2, however, remained as a non-main road intersection.

== Expansion projects ==
=== Mini-Highway Flurlingen Andelfingen ===
On 20 October 2006, the Swiss Federal Department of Environment, Transport, Energy and Communications (DETEC) started a project to strengthen the implementation of the two-lane national highway between Flurlingen and Andelfingen, officially approved as a four-lane mini-freeway. The expansion will cost about 140 million Swiss francs. Thus the large volume of traffic is taken into account.

In the summer of 2007, construction work began on the mini-freeway. The completion and release of the developed part is planned for 20 October 2010.

=== Mini Highway Andelfingen branching Winterthur North ===
According to a media release from the Federal Roads Authority (Winterthur branch), for the year 2014/2015, the expansion of the previously two-lane section of Route Andelfingen to Winterthur North Branch, into a four-lane mini-freeway, is also officially approved.

=== Galgenbucktunnel ===
In May 2007, the Government of the Canton Schaffhausen presented the design project for the Galgenbuck-tunnel. The tunnel serves as a two-lane bypass the town of Neuhausen Rhine Falls. Currently, over 25,000 vehicles travel daily through Neuhausen. After commissioning, it will be only half the traffic. The tunnel has been listed since 1970 in the master plan.

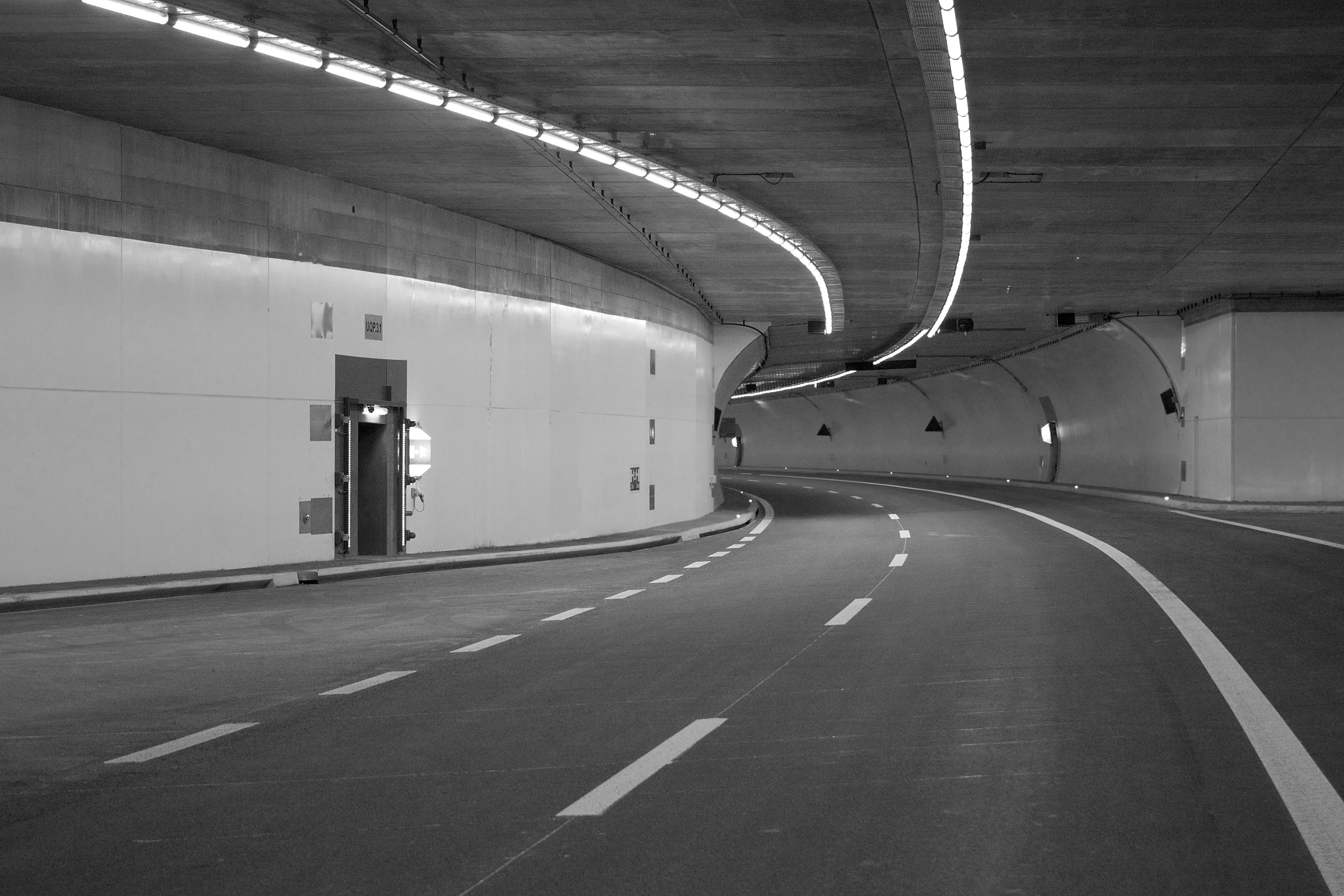
The Islisberg-tunnel inside, showing gradual slope.

From Schaffhausen south, the A4 will create a 1,138-metre (3,734 ft) long tunnel with a slope of 4.5 percent, through the Galgenbuck Klettgau to the main road into the 13th link with the A4 intersections. In the service duct beneath the roadway, an escape tunnel has been built. Since this law concerns the transformation of a motorway connection, the federal government provides, under the new system of financial and division of tasks between the Confederation and the cantons, the full costs of approximately CHF 175 million. Construction is planned for summer 2010, with entry into service in 2014.

== Reclassifying main road 15 as a national road ==
At the federal level, under the title "development of the national road network" (a revision of the WHO, "the Federal Decree") work has been performed on the national road network since 21 June 1960. During the consultation, the Federal Council in mid-2008 had invited the cantons to submit comments.

The so-called "New network decision" provides for the adjustment of the road network in the canton of Schaffhausen before the actual transit traffic. Ending on barges crossing the national highway 4 is obtained on the German side of any road performance, the transit traffic in the direction of Stuttgart, called on the cantonal main road 15 (J15), carried out through the border crossing Thayngen, and then removed from the German federal highway 34, which for Bundesautobahn 81 leads.

The main road 15 is, therefore, planned for 1 January 2010 from the junction to the border Mutzentäli Thayngen / Bietingen to be reclassified to the National Road, and the N4 today in return from the connector Schaffhausen Swiss border, to Bargen / Neuhaus am Randen, will be reclassified as the cantonal main road. The castling of the J15 shall be known N4/A4; the N4 is the new main road 4, while the old main road 4 can be in turn re-classified as the side street.

The Canton of Schaffhausen agreed in principle to the project, with the opinion on 15 September 2008 unanimously (69: 0 votes) adopted. Since the cantonal constitution in the case of the planned new recording of a main road into the national motorway network also requires a referendum for an opinion, this was held on 30 November 2008 and by 88.9% Yes votes (23,974: 2,988 votes) also confirmed.

Compared to the previous state, with the "new network" decision, the national motorway network in the canton of Schaffhausen, is approximately 7.2 kilometres (4.5 mi) shorter. The compensation-eligible main-road network has increased, however, due to the slightly longer course of the N4 towards the H4, and the inclusion of Klettgau Street (Hauptstrasse 13), as a longer total of 19.8 kilometres (12.3 mi).

The connections to the present main road number 15 are incorporated into the existing system of N4/A4. The future course is:

- Border-crossing Thayngen/Bietingen
- Rest station Schwyzerland
- Thayngen (1)
- Rest area Berg
- Kesslerloch (1a)
- Rest area Moos
- Schaffhausen Herblingen (2)
- Schaffhausen Schweizersbild (2a)
- Junction Mutzentäli (3)

== Junction list ==
Exits and structures

| B 27 | Germany |
| Autostrasse A4 |
| | Border-crossing at Oberbargen/Neuhaus am Randen |
| (1) | Bargen |
| (2) | Schaffhausen Schweizersbild |
| (3) | Junction Mutzentäli (T15) |
| (4) | Schaffhausen Nord |
| | Fäsenstaub-Tannerberg (1460 m) |
| (5) | Schaffhausen Süd |
| | Flurlingen/Cholfirst (1250 m) |
| (6) | Flurlingen |
| (7) | Uhwiesen |
| (8) | Benken |
| (9) | Trüllikon |
| (10) | Kleinandelfingen |
| (11) | Adlikon |
| (12) | Henggart |
| Autostrasse A4 |
| | End |
| (13) | Junction Winterthur Nord A 1 |
| (14) | Winterthur Wülflingen |
| (15) | Winterthur Töss |
| | Kempthal |
| (16) | Effretikon |
| | (Rest area) Baltenswil |
| (17) | Autobahnkreuz Brüttisellen A 53 |
| (18) | Wallisellen |
| (19) | Junction Zürich Ost A 1L |
| (20) | Junction Zürich Nord A 51 |
| | Stelzen (380 m) |
| (21) | Zürich Seebach |
| | (Reste area) Büsisee |
| (22) | Zürich Affoltern |
| | Gubrist (3230 m) |
| (23) | Weiningen |
| (24) | Autobahnkreuz Limmattal A 1 A 1H A 3 |
| (25) | Urdorf Nord |
| | Niederurdorf/Honeret (450 m) |
| (26) | Urdorf Süd |
| | Eggrain (480 m) |
| (27) | Uitikon |
| | Hafnerberg (1385 m) |
| (28) | Birmensdorf |
| | End |
| | Aescher (2160 m) - construction (2008) |
| (29) | Junction Zürich West A 3 - construction (2008/2009) |
| (30) | Wettswil - im Bau (2009) |
| | Islisberg (4950 m) - construction (2009) |
| (31) | Affoltern am Albis - construction (2009) |
| | Motorway end |
| | Knonau - provisorisch bis 2009 |
| (32) | Junction Blegi A 4A - in work (2009) |
| (33) | Cham |
| (34) | Junction Rütihof / Holzhäusern A 14 |
| (35) | Rotkreuz |
| (36) | Küssnacht |
| (37) | Arth |
| | Engiberg (263 m) |
| | Schönegg (197 m) |
| (38) | Goldau |
| (39) | Schwyz |
| (40) | Brunnen Nord |
| | Motorway end |
| Autostrasse A4 |
| | Mosi (1080 m) |
| (41) | Brunnen Süd |
| Autostrasse A4 |
| Hauptstrasse N4 (Axenstrasse) |
| Autostrasse A4 |
| (42) | Flüelen |
| | Umfahrung Flüelen (2600 m) |
| Autostrasse A4 |
| Hauptstrasse N4 |
| (44) | Junction Altdorf / Flüelen A 2 |
| A 2 |

Autobahn part A4a

| A 4 |
| (1) | Junction Blegi A 4 - construction (2009) |
| (2) | Zug |
| (3) | Baar |
| (4) | Walterswil / Sihlbrugg |
| | End |
