= N14 =

N14 may refer to:

== Roads ==
- N14 road (Belgium), a a national road in Belgium
- Route nationale 14, in France
- N14 road (Ireland)
- N14 expressway (Netherlands)
- N14 (South Africa)
- A14 motorway (Switzerland)
- Nebraska Highway 14, in the United States

== Vehicles ==
- LNER Class N14, a class of British steam locomotives
- Nissan Pulsar (N14), a Japanese automobile
- HMS Porpoise (N14), a submarine of the Royal Navy

== Other uses ==
- N14 (Long Island bus)
- BMW N14, an automobile engine
- Flying W Airport in Burlington County, New Jersey, United States
- Nitrogen-14, an isotope of nitrogen
- N14, a postcode district in the N postcode area

== See also ==
- 14N (disambiguation)
