= A1 motorway (Switzerland) =

Motorway in Switzerland

Coordinates: 47.031437°N 7.527266°E

A1

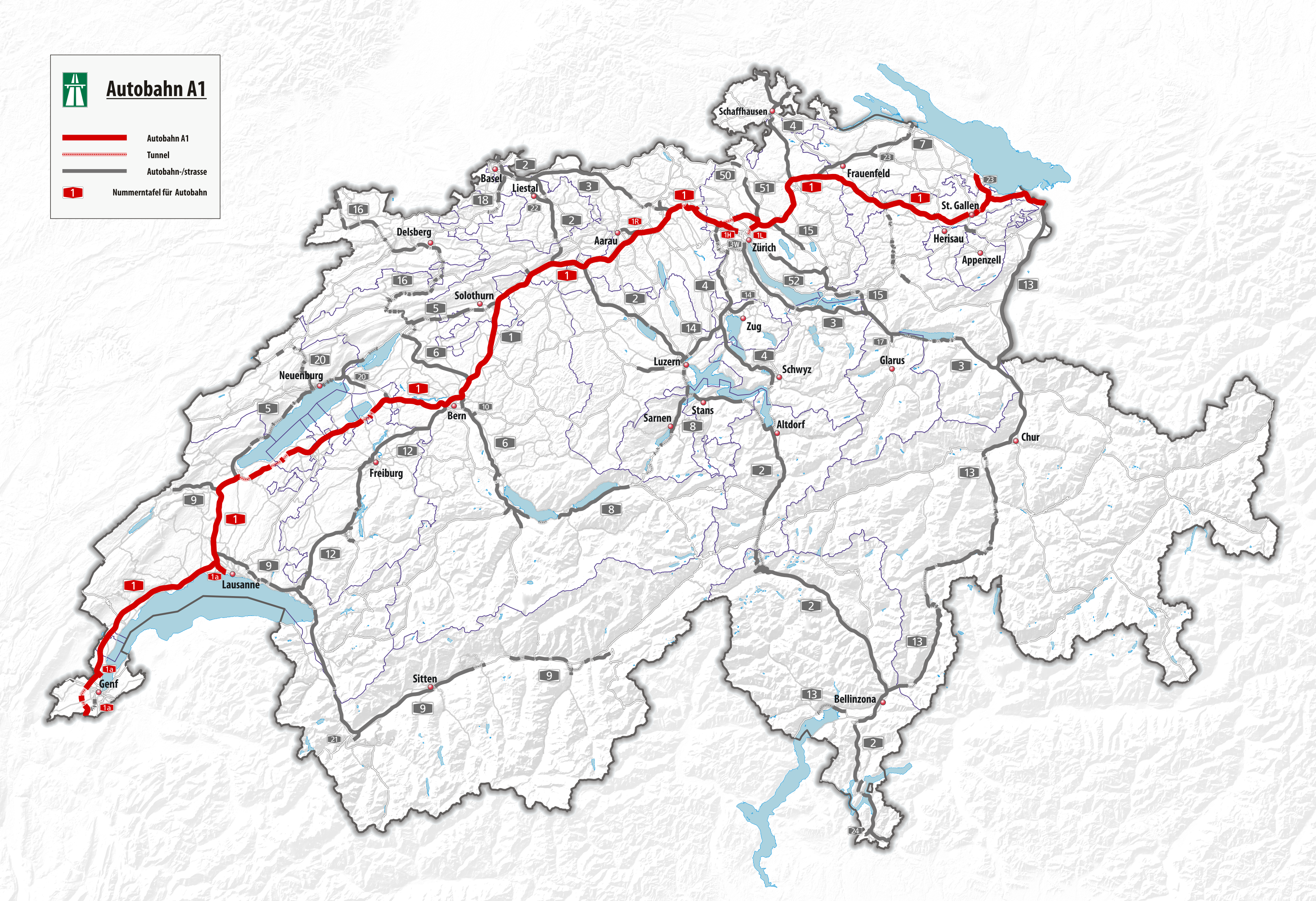
- Location of the A1 within Switzerland

Route information
- Part of E23 E25 E27 E35 E41 E60 E62
- Length: 410 km (250 mi)

Location
- Country: Switzerland

Highway system
- Transport in Switzerland; Motorways

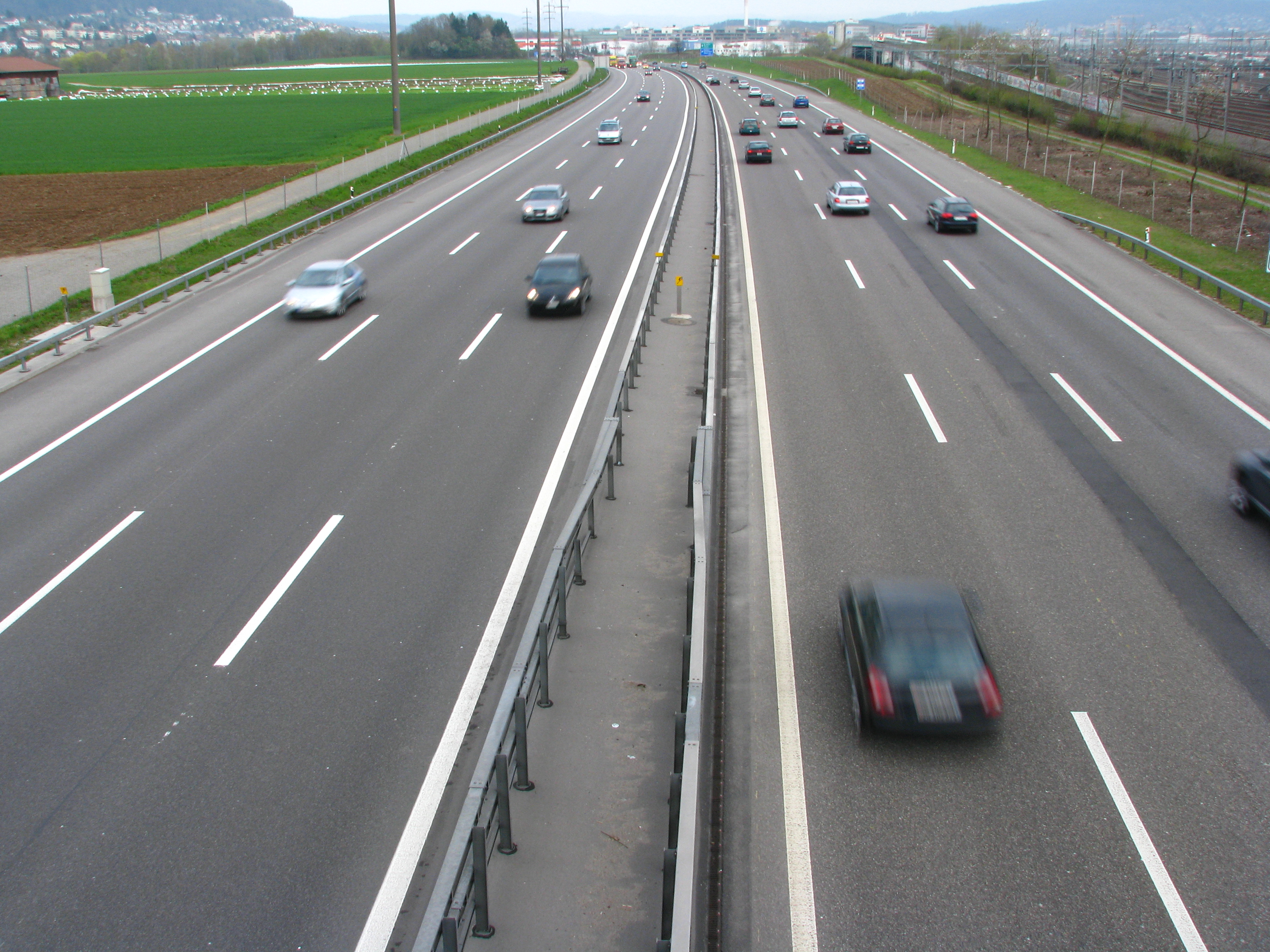
A1 between Oetwil an der Limmat and Spreitenbach in the Limmat Valley (April 2010)

The A1 is a motorway in Switzerland. It follows Switzerland's main east–west axis, from St. Margrethen in northeastern Switzerland's canton of St. Gallen through to Geneva in southwestern Switzerland. The motorway spans 383 km (240 mi). Besides the motorway's main route, it has several branches that are variously numbered A1a, A1h, A1l and A1.1. It was opened for the Swiss national exhibition of 1964.

After the construction of the third Baregg Tunnel tube, the traffic jams in this area were reduced, but the Gubrist Tunnel remains with the old capacity as a new point of heavy traffic. The A1 motorway is connected via a taxiway at the hangar 5 with the airfield of Payerne Air Base and can, if necessary, be used as a runway for takeoff and landing. However, this possibility has never been used since the construction of the highway.

== Exit list ==
Exits and buildings

A 41	France
	Border crossing at Bardonnex / Saint-Julien-en-Genevois
(1)	Fork Perly A 1A
(2)	Perly
	Confignon (1240 m)
(3)	Bernex
	Chèvres (400 m)
	Vernier (1900 m)
(4)	Vernier
(5)	Meyrin
(6)	Genève Aéroport
(7)	Genève Aéroport / Ferney
(8)	Versoix
(9)	Fork Le Vengeron A 1A
(10)	Coppet
	(rest area) Crans près Céligny
(11)	Nyon
(12)	Gland
	La côte
(13)	Rolle
(14)	Aubonne
	(rest area) Etoy
(15)	Morges Ouest
(16)	Morges Est
(17)	Fork Écublens A 1A
(18)	Lausanne Crissier
(19)	Fork Villars-Ste-Croix A 9
(20)	Cossonay
(21)	La Sarraz
	(rest area) Bavois
(22)	Chavornay
(23)	Fork Essert-Pittet A 9
(24)	Fork Yverdon A 5
(25)	Yverdon Sud
	Pomy (3000 m)
	Arrissoules (2987 m)
	Rose de la Broye
(26)	Estavayer-le-Lac
(27)	Payerne
(28)	Avenches
(29)	Murten
(30)	Kerzers
(31)	Mühleberg
(32)	Bern Brünnen
	Brünnen (510 m)
(33)	Bern Bethlehem
(34)	Fork Bern Weyermannshaus A 12
(35)	Bern Forsthaus
(36)	Bern Neufeld
	Felsenaubrücke
(37)	Fork Bern Wankdorf A 6
	Grauholz
(38)	Fork Schönbühl A 6
	(rest area)
(39)	Kirchberg
(40)	Kriegstetten
(41)	Fork Luterbach A 5
	Deitingen
(42)	Wangen
	(rest area) Oberbipp
(43)	Niederbipp
(44)	Oensingen
(45)	Fork Härkingen A 2
	Gunzgen
(46)	Rothrist
(47)	Fork Wiggertal A 2
(48)	Oftringen
	(rest area)
	Kölliken
(49)	Aarau West
(50)	Aarau Ost
	(rest area)
(51)	Lenzburg
	(rest area)
(52)	Mägenwil
(53)	Fork Birrfeld A 3
(54)	Baden West
	Baregg (1390 m)
(55)	Neuenhof
	Neuenhof
(56)	Wettingen Ost
	Würenlos / "Fressbalken"
(57)	Spreitenbach - planned
(58)	Dietikon
(59)	Autobahnkreuz Limmattal A 1H / A 3 / A 4
(60)	Weiningen
	Gubristtunnel (3230 m)
(61)	Zürich Affoltern
	(rest area) Büsisee
(62)	Zürich Seebach
	Stelzen (380 m)
(63)	Fork Zürich Nord A 51
(64)	Fork Zürich Ost A 1L
(65)	Wallisellen
(66)	Autobahnkreuz Brüttisellen A 53
	(rest area) Baltenswil
(67)	Effretikon
	Kempthal
(68)	Winterthur Töss
(69)	Winterthur Wülflingen
(70)	Fork Winterthur Nord A 4
(71)	Winterthur Ohringen
	Forrenberg
(72)	Oberwinterthur
(73)	Fork Winterthur Ost A 7
(74)	Attikon
	(rest area) Oberweiler
(75)	Matzingen
	(rest area) Hexentobel
(76)	Münchwilen
(76a)	Wil West - planned
(77)	Wil
	Thurau
(78)	Oberbüren-Uzwil
(79)	Gossau
	(rest area) Wildhus
(80)	St. Gallen Winkeln
	(rest area) Moosmüli
(81)	St. Gallen Kreuzbleiche
	Rosenberg (1440 m)
(82)	St. Gallen St. Fiden
	Stephanshorn (570 m)
(83)	St. Gallen Neudorf
(84)	Fork Meggenhus A 1.1
	(rest area)
(85)	Rheineck
	St. Margrethen
(86)	St. Margrethen (Fork to S18 - planned)
A 13

Autoroute part A1a (Genève)

A 1
(1)	Fork Perly A 1
;	(1)	Perly
(2)	Lancy Sud / Carouge
(3)	La Praille / Carouge
(4)	Etoile
end of autoroute
Genève Centre / Les Vernets

Autoroute part A1a (Genève Lac)

A 1
(1)	Fork Le Vengeron A 1
(2)	Genève Lac
	end of autoroute
	Genève Route de Meyrin

Autoroute part A1a (Lausanne)

A 1
(1)	Fork Écublens A 1
(2)	Lausanne Malley
(3)	Lausanne Maladière
	end of autoroute
	Lausanne Kreisel Maladière

Autobahn part A1h (A3)

A 3 / A 4
(1)	Autobahnkreuz Limmattal A 1 / A 3 / A 4
(2)	Zürich Altstetten
(3)	Hardturm
	end of autobahn
	Zürich Pfingstweidstrasse

Autobahn part A1l

Autostrasse A1l
(1)	Zürich Letten
	Milchbuck (1910 m)
Autostrasse A1l
	end of autobahn
(2)	Zürich Unterstrass
	Schöneich Tunnel
(3)	Zürich Schwamendingen
	Schöneich Tunnel
(4)	Zürich Aubrugg
(5)	Fork Zürich Ost A 1 / A 4
A 1 / A 4

Autobahn part A1.1

Autostrasse A1.1
(1)	Arbon West
(2)	Arbon Süd
Autostrasse A1.1
	end of autobahn
(3)	Rorschach
(4)	Fork Meggenhus A 1
A 1

== See also ==
- Transportation in Switzerland
