= Dany Gignoux =

Swiss photojournalist and photographer (1944–2025)

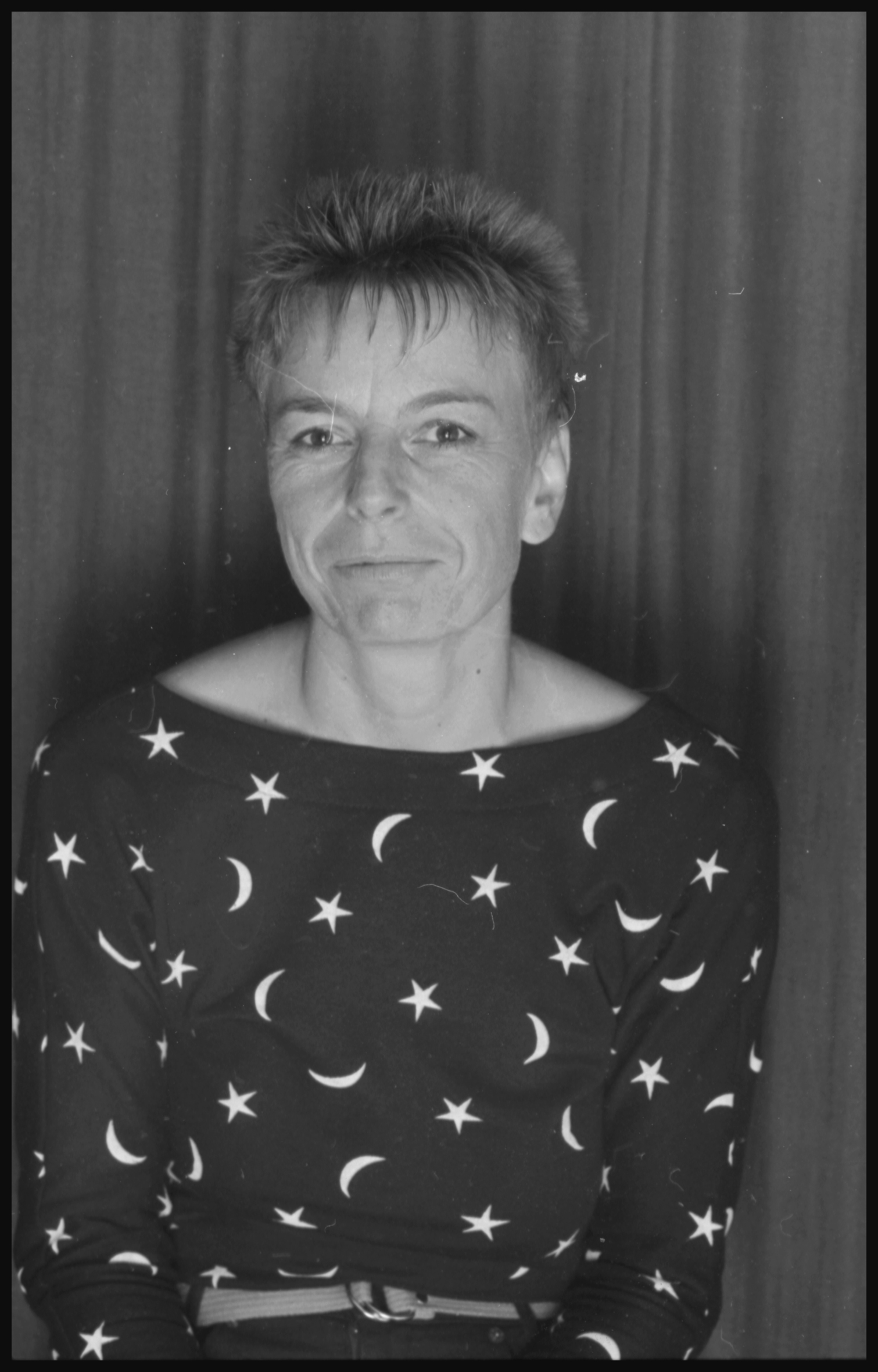
- Gignoux in 2020
- Born: Danielle Gignoux; 27 May 1944; Geneva, Switzerland
- Died: 11 August 2025 (aged 81); Plan-les-Ouates, Switzerland
- Occupations: Photojournalist; Photographer

Danielle Gignoux (27 May 1944 – 11 August 2025) was a Swiss photojournalist and photographer.

== Life and career ==
Born in Geneva on 27 May 1944, Gignoux attended language school, learning English and German. In 1967, she joined the International Federation of Red Cross and Red Crescent Societies and purchased her first camera, a Pentax. In 1973, she began collaborating with the French photo agency Gamma and began to cover folk and popular music in Switzerland, spiritualism in Brazil, and the lighthouses on the Île de Sein in France. From 1981 to 1982, she worked for the Swiss magazine L'Illustré, where she took photographs of concerts in Geneva, the new headquarters of the Association pour la musique improvisée, the Carnival of Basel, African migrants in Geneva, and tourists in Switzerland and Italy. She also covered the closure of the Café Monney in 1983.

In 1985, Gignoux took part in a new mission for the International Committee of the Red Cross in Ethiopia, in which she took photographs of refugee camps. From 1986 to 1987, she directed a program titled "La Suisse au fil du temps" Radio Télévision Suisse, which included coverage of St. Martin's Day and traditional Swiss butchery in the Bas-Valais. In 1989, she followed the troupe Mir Caravane during their tour around Europe.

Dany Gignoux died in Plan-les-Ouates on 11 August 2025, at the age of 81.
