= Arrissoules =

- Village
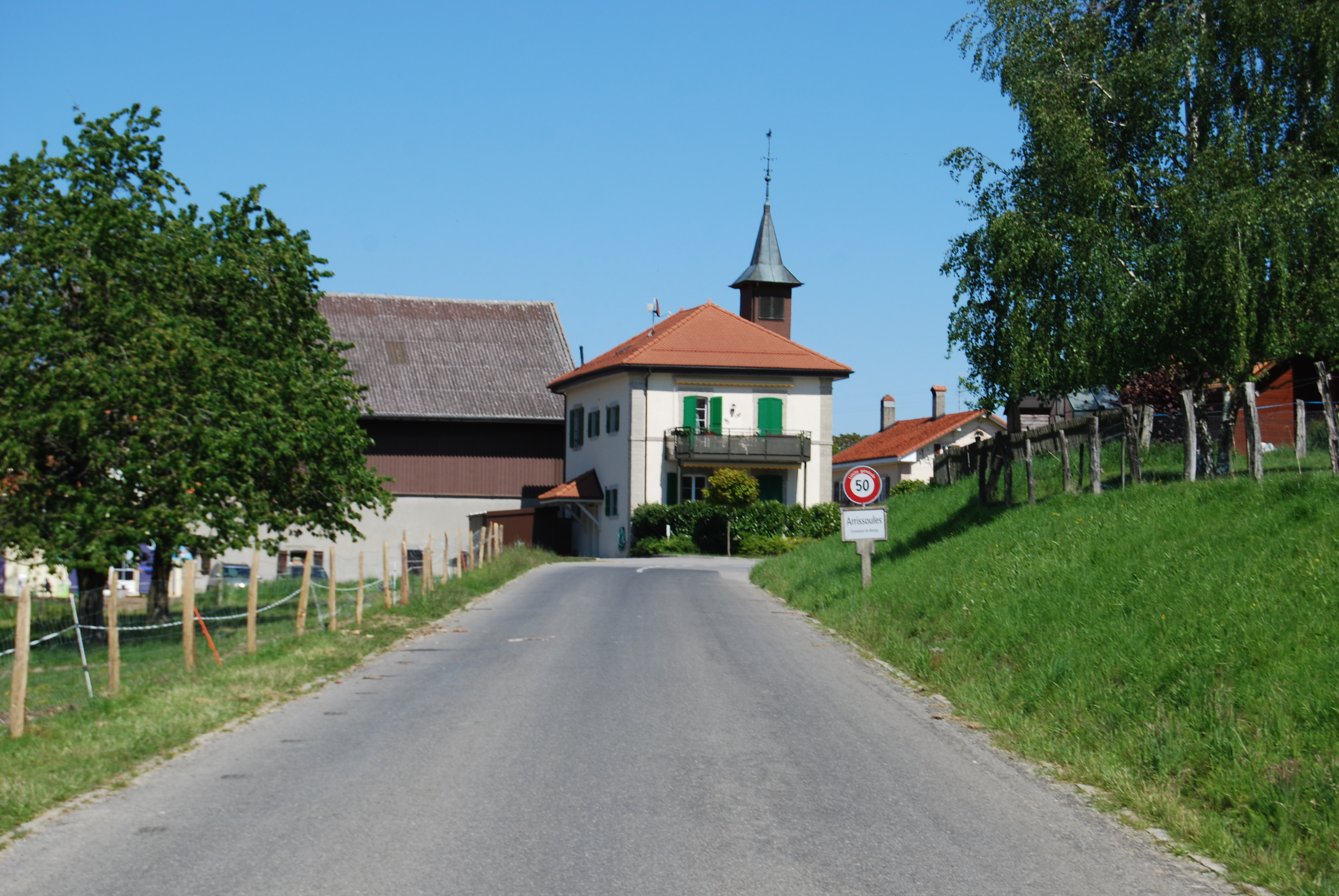
- Interactive map of Arrissoules
- Coordinates: 46°47′54″N 6°46′47″E
- Country: Switzerland
- Canton: Vaud
- District: Yverdon
- Time zone: UTC+1 (CET)
  - Summer (DST): UTC+2 (CEST)

Arrissoules is a village in the district of Yverdon of the Canton of Vaud, Switzerland.

The village was an independent municipality until it was incorporated into Rovray on January 1, 2005.

The Arrissoules Tunnel of the A1 motorway is located near the village.
