= Mosi Tunnel =

Motorway tunnel in Switzerland

Coordinates: 46°59′42″N 8°36′52″E

The Mosi Tunnel is a motorway tunnel in Switzerland which opened in 1964. It is situated on the A4 and also the main part of the bypass of Brunnen SZ which leads between Brunnen North and Brunnen South. The two lane tunnel (one lane for each direction) is 1100 metres long and links the motorway A4 with the Axenstrasse. It is the longest road tunnel in the Canton of Schwyz and will be until the Morschacher Tunnel opens between Brunnen North and Sisikon. Then the Mositunnel will lose its status as a motorway tunnel and will “only” be a main street tunnel.

== Security ==
Three dramatic crashes in 13 months and subpar results from an international tunnel test started many discussions about the security of the tunnel in 2007. A service tunnel was completed in 2016. Some drivers say that their windshield fogs up at the entrance to the north end of the tunnel.

== Accidents ==
In three car accidents during November 2007 and December 2008 three people died and at least three were injured. All the crashes happened the same way: A car driving from north to south goes into the other lane to pass and crashes into a lorry which goes out of control. In the first two cases, the following cars could brake or make way in time, but in the third accident in December 2008 the lorry crashed into another car and then into the wall.

== Measures ==
Some safety measures will soon be installed such as the painted midline which separates the two lanes getting new reflectors installed. Meanwhile, arrows which show the right direction to go have already been painted but they have been criticized by motorcyclists because of the danger of slipping on the painted sections when it is wet.
