= Schöneich Tunnel =

Road tunnel in Zürich, Switzerland

Coordinates: 47.4035°N 8.5564°E

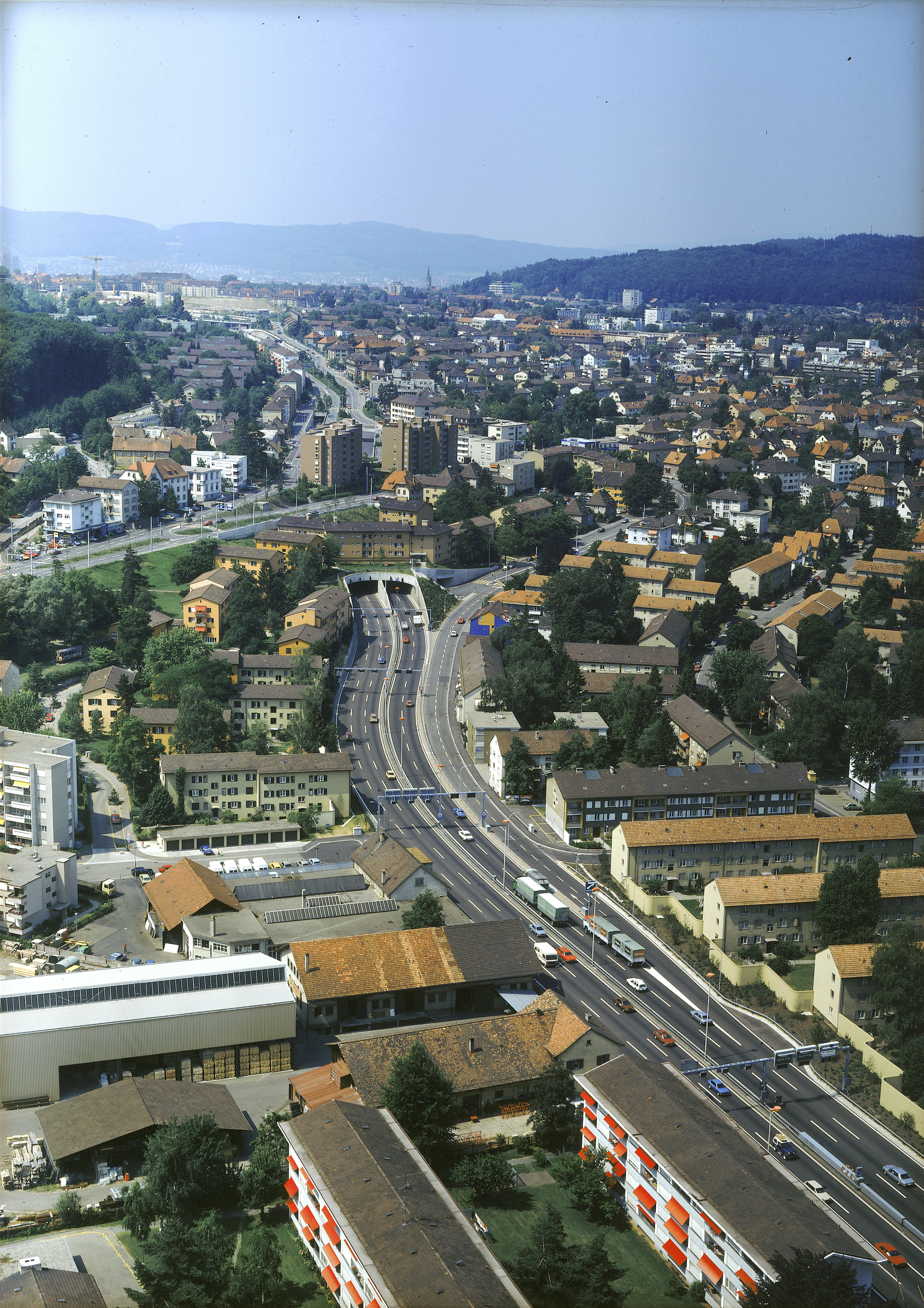
Aerial view of Schöneich Tunnel before the extension as seen from southwest (1982)

The Schöneich Tunnel is a motorway tunnel in Switzerland, and forms part of the A1L motorway in the city of Zurich between Zurich Schwamendingen and the Letten Tunnel.

Opened to traffic on 20 August 1980, the tunnel was originally around 750 m (2,460 ft) long. The tunnel was extended as part of the project Einhausung Schwamendingen, by another 940 m (3,080 ft), bringing its length to a total of 1.7 km (1.1 mi). This extension was completed in 2024. The tram lines 7 and 9 run in a dedicated tram tunnel below the tunnel.
