= Baregg Tunnel =

Motorway tunnel near the city of Baden in Swiss canton of Aargau

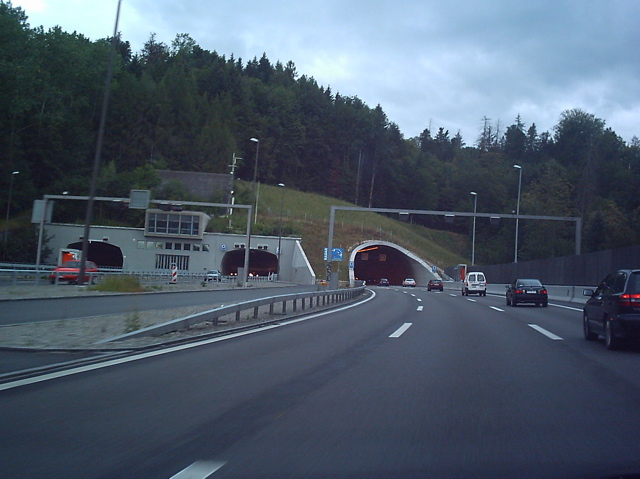
- west portal (2004)
- Interactive map of Baregg Tunnel

Overview
- Location: Baden, Aargau, Switzerland
- Coordinates: 47°27′36″N 8°17′54″E
- Status: Active
- Route: A1 motorway

Operation
- Opened: 1970 (first two bores); 2003 (third bore)
- Character: road

Technical
- Length: 1,390 metres (4,560 ft) (first two bores); 1,148 metres (3,766 ft) (third bore)
- No. of lanes: 7

The Baregg Tunnel is a motorway tunnel near the city of Baden in Swiss canton of Aargau, which forms part of the A1 motorway between western Switzerland and Zürich. The tunnel comprises three bores through Baregg, built at two different times. The first two bores, each carrying two traffic lanes, were opened in 1970 and are 1,390 metres (4,560 ft) long. The third bore, carrying three traffic lanes, was opened in 2003 and is 1,148 metres (3,766 ft) long.

Since the opening of the third bore, the four lanes of the original two bores are used for eastbound traffic, whilst the new bore's three lanes are used for westbound traffic.

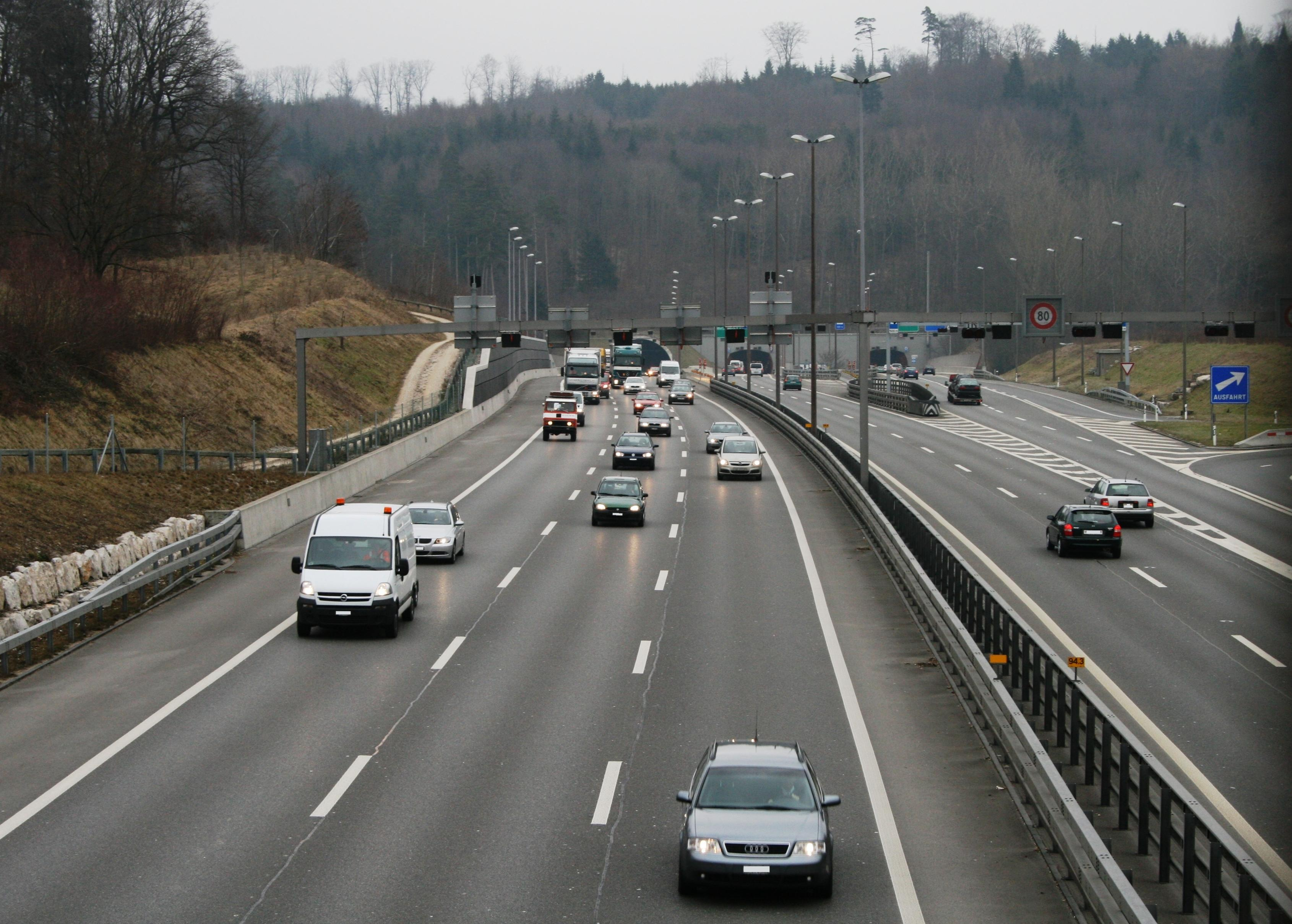
A1 at west portal (2008)

A1 under construction (1969)
