= Saconnex d'Arve =

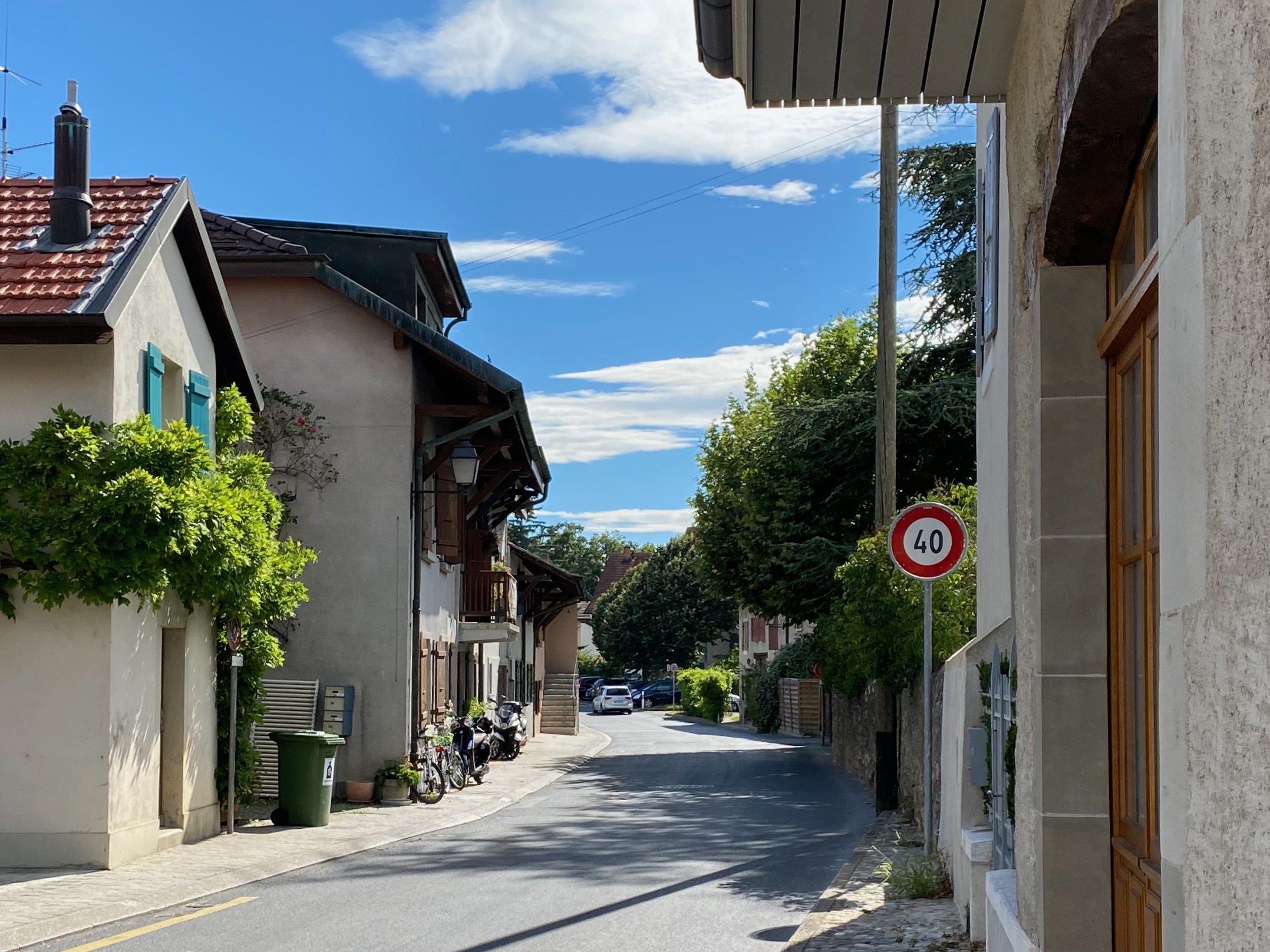
Route de Saconnex-d'Arve, in 2020

Saconnex d'Arve is a hamlet in the municipality of Plan-les-Ouates in the Canton of Geneva, Switzerland. It is divided in two, Saconnex d'Arve Dessous and Saconnex d'Arve Dessus.

== History ==
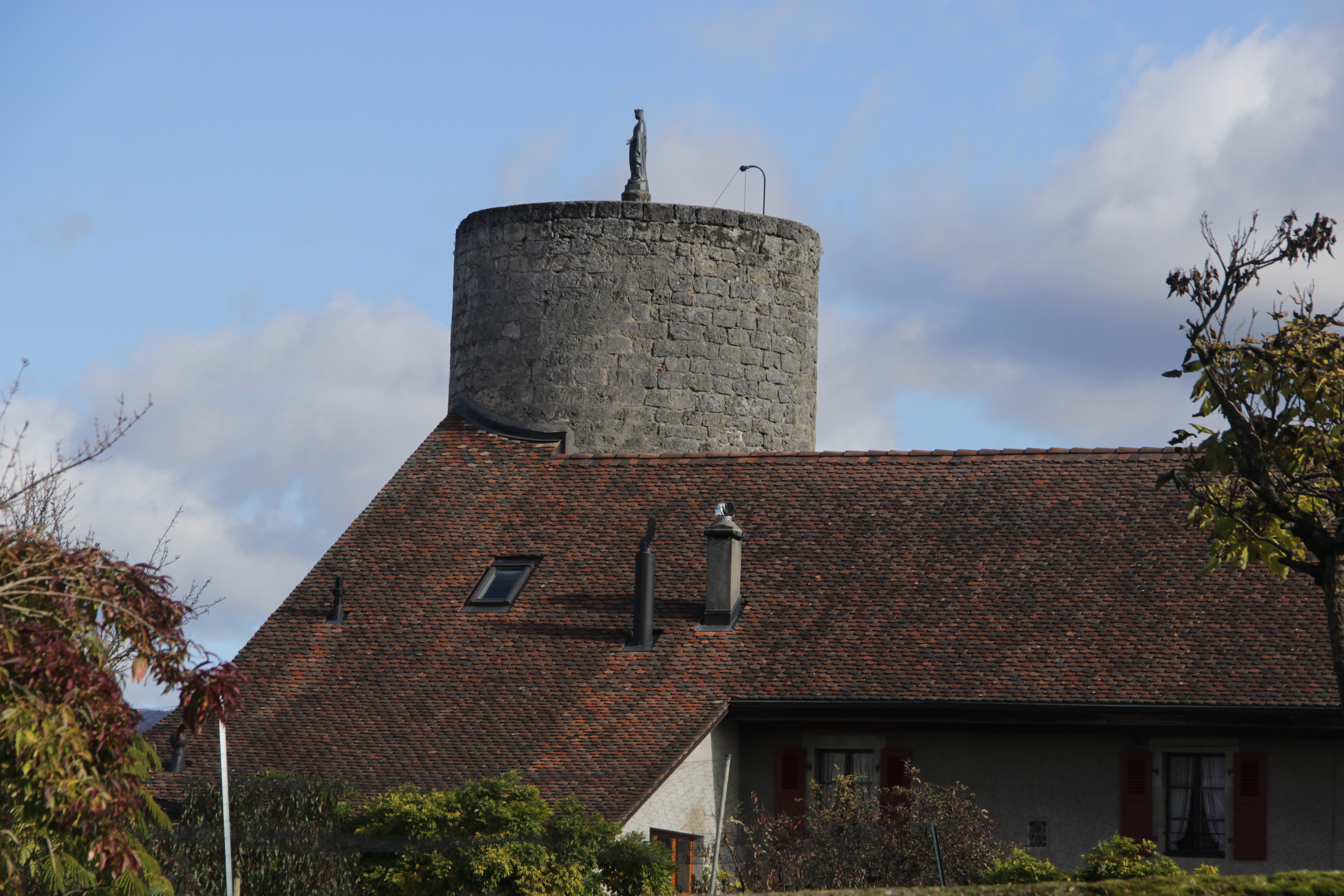
What remains of the old castle in Saconnex d'Arve

The hamlet is named after the de Sacconay family, who lived in the area beginning in the 12th century, settling on the right bank of the Rhône river. A castle was built in the area by Amadeus II from 1299–1301, at La Tour. In 1536, the hamlet was looted by Bernese troops, and it was later occupied by Savoy.

The castle and its connected fiefdom then changed hands repeatedly, and in 1544 the castle was ceded to Genevan bourgeois Hugues Vandel by its previous owner Marin de Ternier, following a legal conflict. Following Vandel's acquiring of the castle, it and the surrounding area were named Saconnex-Vandel. It was converted into a county in 1652. The castle was largely destroyed in 1590 at the order of the Geneva Council. At the beginning of the 21st century there was only one tower of the castle left. A statue of the Virgin Mary was placed on its top towards the end of the 18th century.

The hamlet is the origin place of the Order of the Solar Temple, a religious group which would later become notorious for mass suicides in the 1990s. Starting in the 1970s, for about 15 years, the hamlet was home to the Golden Way Foundation and later the OTS. Members at the Saconnex d'Arve location lived cut off from the rest of the world and secluded from the rest of the town.

== Geography ==
It is a hamlet within the Plan-les-Ouates municipality in the Canton of Geneva. It is located on the left bank of the Rhône. It has two parts, Saconnex-Dessus and Saconnex-Dessous.

== Education ==
The hamlet had a primary school until it was closed in 2015. At the time of its closure it had existed for over 100 years. It had 22 students, and would have only had 12 students at the start of the school year. Students from the hamlet thereafter went to schools in the surrounding area.
