= Arrissoules Tunnel =

Road tunnel in Switzerland

- Interactive map of Arrissoules Tunnel

Overview
- Location: Fribourg/Vaud, Switzerland
- Coordinates: 46.796°N 6.781°E
- Status: Active
- Route: A1 motorway

Operation
- Opened: 2000
- Character: road

Technical
- Length: 2,987 metres (9,800 ft)

Arissoules Tunnel (French: Tunnel d'Arrissoules) is a motorway tunnel in the Swiss cantons of Fribourg and Vaud, near the village of Arrissoules. The tunnel forms part of the A1 motorway from Geneva to St. Margrethen. It is 2,987 metres (9,800 ft) long, and was opened in 2000.
