= 14N =

14N may refer to:

- Gnome-Rhône 14N, a World War II French 14-cylinder two-row air-cooled radial engine
- Kodak DCS Pro 14n, a 2002 professional F-mount digital SLR camera
- Nitrogen-14 (^{14}N), an isotope of nitrogen

== See also ==
- N14 (disambiguation)
