= A2 motorway (Switzerland) =

Motorway in Switzerland

A2

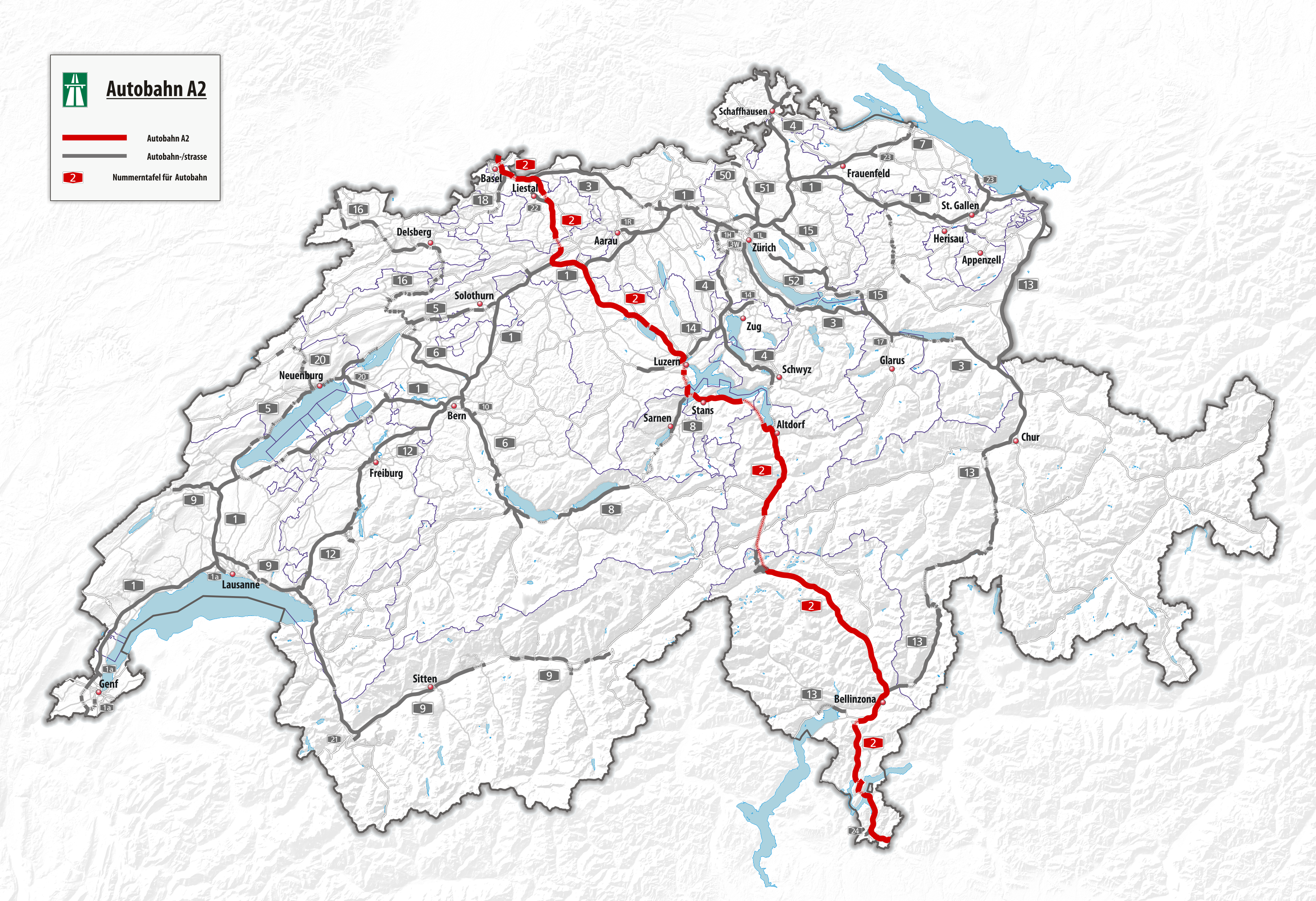
- Location of the A2 within Switzerland

Route information
- Part of E35

Major junctions
- North end: A5 at German border
- A1 A8; A13 A14
- South end: A9 at Italian border

Location
- Country: Switzerland

Highway system
- Transport in Switzerland; Motorways

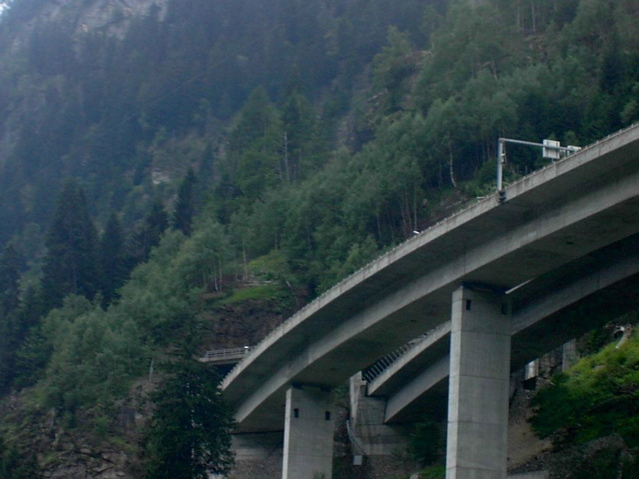
The A2 motorway in Ticino, suspended over viaducts

The A2 (the Gotthard Motorway, Italian: Autostrada del San Gottardo, German: Gotthard-Autobahn) is a motorway in Switzerland. It forms Switzerland's main north–south axis from Basel to Chiasso, meandering with a slight drift toward the east. It lies on the Gotthard axis and crosses the Alps. Opened in 1955 under the name "Road Lucerne-south", A2 is one of the busiest motorways in Switzerland.

The A2 motorway leaves Basel heading south toward Olten, Sursee, Luzern, Stans, Altdorf, Erstfeld, Göschenen, Airolo, Biasca, Bellinzona, Lugano and reaches Chiasso. It intersects with the A1, A8, A13 and A14 motorways.

The St. Gotthard Tunnel lies at the heart of the motorway and makes up its culminating point. With a maximum elevation of 1,175 metres (3,855 ft) at the tunnel's highest point, the A2 motorway has the lowest maximum elevation of any direct north–south road through the Alps. Traffic jams stretching for kilometres on end are frequently found on both entrances of the tunnel, but more frequently on the northern flank. The difficulty with driving through the St. Gotthard tunnel is that it is a motorway tunnel with one lane per direction, but without a central reservation. So far, The Swiss government has decided to upgrade the second tunnel into a full road tunnel in order to allow for the necessary reconstruction of the first road tunnel. Once the works on the first tunnel are finished, the Swiss government plans to operate one single lane in each tunnel (northbound traffic in the newly constructed tunnel, southbound traffic in the renovated one) in order to maintain the current tunnel overall capacity, in compliance with the Swiss constitutional norm that forbids a further growth of the traffic capacity across the Alps. The reconstruction would have lasted for several years in any variant – one variant would push the traffic over the mountain pass, another proposed to load the vehicles onto trains with a new terminal, a third would close the tunnel for several months every year over time range of a decade. All of these have their drawbacks and the usage of the second tunnel was chosen as the best option to allow for the reconstruction. Further usage of both tunnels was subject to a popular referendum that was held in February 2016, where it was approved. The actual upgrade mining of the second road tunnel would last from 2020 to 2027 at a cost of 2.7 billion francs for the whole project including the following reconstruction of the first tunnel.

Near Lucerne, this motorway passes through the Sonnenberg Tunnel, which until recently was the world's largest nuclear blast shelter.

== List of Exits ==
Listed are exits heading south as of Basel
Symbols: ↗ = exit (↘ = exit only; → = only when heading for Chiasso; ← = only when heading for Basel); ⇆ = main interchange; S = service area

=== Canton of Basel-Stadt ===
Border with Germany (German A 5)

- ⇆ 1: (Basel Wiese interchange with motorway heading for France)
- ↗ 2: (←) Basel Bad Bahnhof
- ↗ 3: Basel Wettstein
- ↗ 4: Basel Breite, Birsfelden
- ↗ 5: Basel City
- ⇆ 6: (Hagnau interchange with J18 (Switzerland)) Zürich, Delémont
- ↗ 7: Pratteln, Schweizerhalle, Auhafen, Augst
- S Pratteln

=== Canton of Basel Landschaft ===
- ↗ 8: Liestal
- ↗ 9: (Augst interchange with A3)
- ↗ 10: Arisdorf
- ↗ 11: Sissach
- ↗ 12: Diegten
- ↗ 13: (←) Eptingen

=== Canton of Solothurn ===
- ↗ 14: Egerkingen

=== Canton of Aargau ===
- ⇆ 15: (Härkingen interchange with A1)
- ↗ 16: Rothrist

=== Canton of Lucerne ===
- ⇆ 17: (Wiggertal interchange with A1)
- ↗ 18: Reiden
- ↗ 19: Dagmersellen
- ↗ 20: Sursee
- ↗ 21: Sempach
- ↗ 22: Rothenburg (planned)
- ↗ 23: Emmen, Switzerland Nord
- ⇆ 24: (Rotsee interchange with A14)
- ↗ 25: Emmen Süd
- ↗ 26: (→) Luzern Zentrum
- ↗ 27: Luzern - Kriens
- ↗ 28: Luzern - Horw

=== Canton of Nidwalden ===
- ↗ 29: (→) Hergiswil
- ↗ 30: (→) Lopper (planned)
- ↗ 29: (←) Hergiswil
- ↗ 31: (→) Stansstad
- ↗ 32: Stans Nord
- ↗ 33: Stans Süd
- ↗ 34: Buochs
- ↗ 35: Beckenried

=== Canton of Uri ===
- ↗ 36: Altdorf
- ↗ 37: Erstfeld
- ↗ 38: Amsteg
- ↗ 39: Wassen
- ↗ 40: Göschenen

=== Canton of Ticino ===
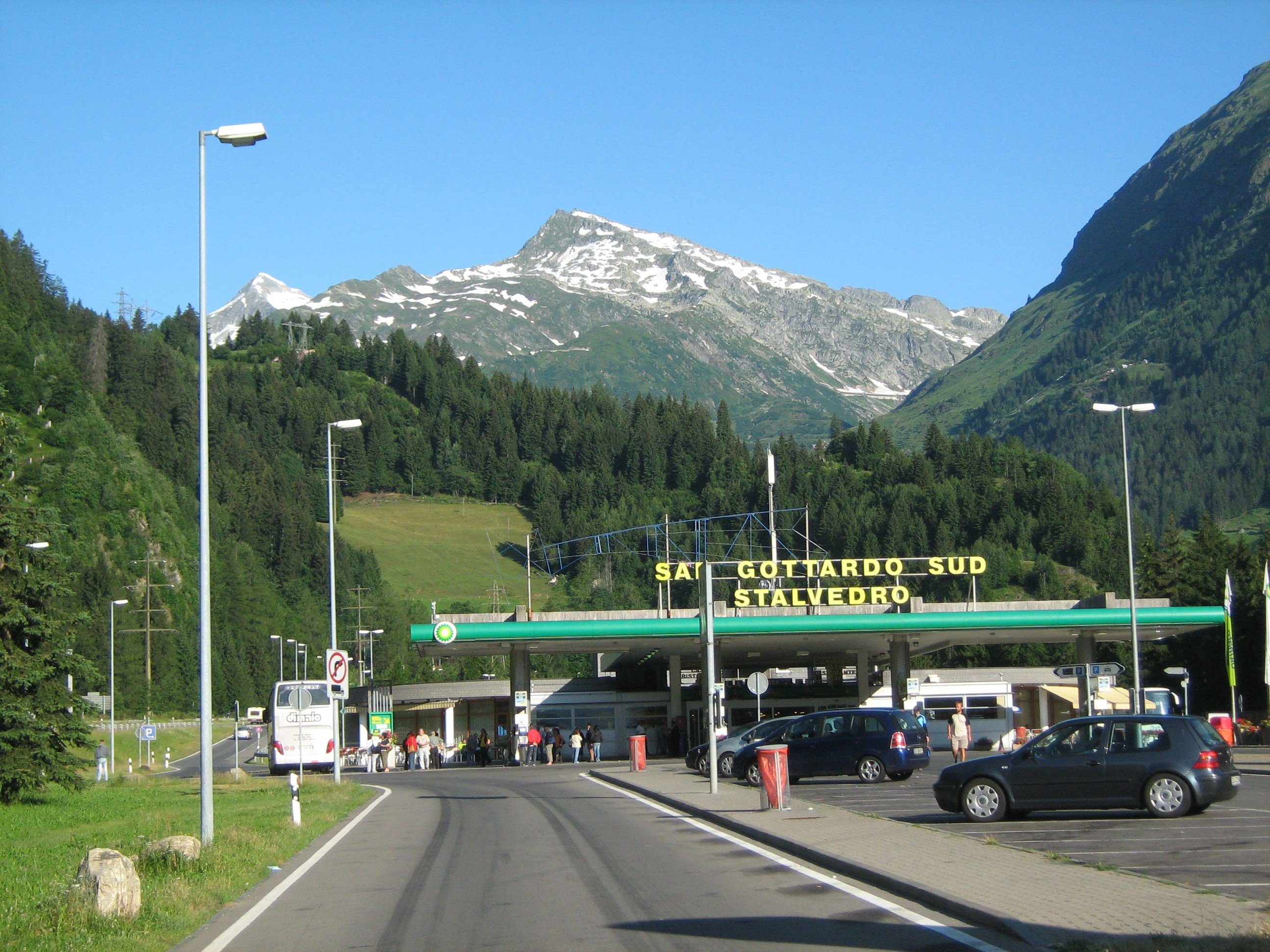
Service area Stalvedro in Ticino.

- ↗ 41: Airolo
- S Stalvedro
- ↗ 42: Quinto
- ↗ 43: Faido
- ↗ 44: Biasca
- ⇆ 45: (Interchange with A13 to Chur) Bellinzona Nord
- S Bellinzona
- ↗ 46: Bellinzona Centro (planned)
- ⇆ 47: (Interchange with A13 to Locarno) Bellinzona Sud
- ↗ 48: Rivera
- ↗ 49: Lugano Nord
- ↗ 50: Lugano Sud
- ↗ 51: Melide, Bissone, Morcote, Campione d'Italia
- ↗ 52: Mendrisio
- S Coldrerio
- ↗ 53: Chiasso
- ↗ 54: Chiasso Centro

Border with Italy (Italian Autostrada A9)
