= Perly-Certoux =

- Municipality
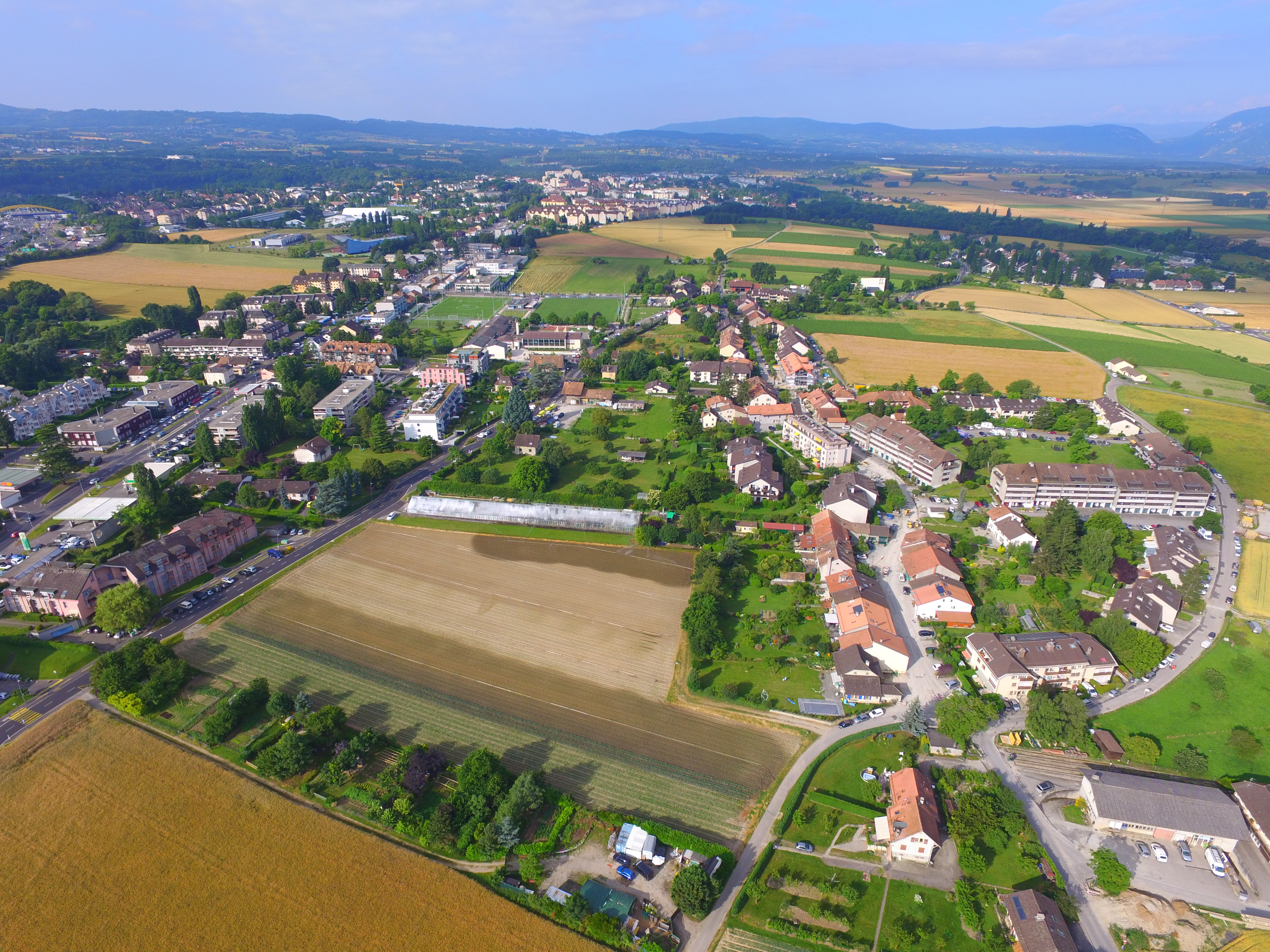
- Aerial view of Perly-Certoux in 2016

- Flag Coat of arms
- Location of Perly-Certoux
- Location within Switzerland Location within Canton of Geneva
- Coordinates: 46°09′N 06°05′E
- Country: Switzerland
- Canton: Geneva
- District: n.a.

Government
  - Mayor: Maire; Fernand Savigny

Area
  - Total: 2.53 km^{2} (0.98 sq mi)
- Elevation: 439 m (1,440 ft)

Population (December 2020)
  - Total: 3,127
  - Density: 1,240/km^{2} (3,200/sq mi)
- Time zone: UTC+01:00 (CET)
  - Summer (DST): UTC+02:00 (CEST)
- Postal code: 1258
- SFOS number: 6632
- ISO 3166 code: CH-GE
- Surrounded by: Bardonnex, Bernex, Confignon, Plan-les-Ouates, Saint-Julien-en-Genevois (FR-74), Soral
- Website: www.perly-certoux.ch

Perly-Certoux is a municipality of the canton of Geneva in Switzerland.

== History ==
Perly is first mentioned in 1124 as de Perliaco. Certoux was mentioned in 1537 as Sartoux.

== Geography ==
Perly-Certoux has an area, as of 2009, of 2.53 square kilometers (0.98 sq mi). Of this area, 1.78 km^{2} (0.69 sq mi) or 70.4% is used for agricultural purposes, while 0.08 km^{2} (0.031 sq mi) or 3.2% is forested. Of the rest of the land, 0.68 km^{2} (0.26 sq mi) or 26.9% is settled (buildings or roads), 0.01 km^{2} (2.5 acres) or 0.4% is either rivers or lakes.

Of the built up area, industrial buildings made up 1.6% of the total area while housing and buildings made up 12.3% and transportation infrastructure made up 10.7%. while parks, green belts and sports fields made up 2.0%. Out of the forested land, 2.0% of the total land area is heavily forested and 1.2% is covered with orchards or small clusters of trees. Of the agricultural land, 51.4% is used for growing crops and 4.7% is pastures, while 14.2% is used for orchards or vine crops. All the water in the municipality is flowing water.

The municipality is located on the left bank of the Rhone river. It consists of the villages of Perly and Certoux.

== Demographics ==
Largest groups of foreign residents 2013
Nationality	Amount	% total (population)
Portugal	219	7.1
France	174	5.7
Italy	109	3.6
Spain	46	1.5
UK	25	0.8
Brazil	23	0.8
Belgium	15	0.5
Germany	14	0.5
Kosovo	12	0.4
Algeria	12	0.4

Perly-Certoux has a population (as of December 2020) of 3,127. As of 2008, 23.9% of the population are resident foreign nationals. Over the last 10 years (1999–2009 ) the population has changed at a rate of 4.7%. It has changed at a rate of -4.9% due to migration and at a rate of 9.8% due to births and deaths.

Most of the population (as of 2000) speaks French (2,403 or 86.4%), with Italian being second most common (89 or 3.2%) and German being third (84 or 3.0%). There is 1 person who speaks Romansh.

As of 2008, the gender distribution of the population was 49.0% male and 51.0% female. The population was made up of 1,031 Swiss men (35.4% of the population) and 397 (13.6%) non-Swiss men. There were 1,126 Swiss women (38.7%) and 358 (12.3%) non-Swiss women. Of the population in the municipality 500 or about 18.0% were born in Perly-Certoux and lived there in 2000. There were 934 or 33.6% who were born in the same canton, while 434 or 15.6% were born somewhere else in Switzerland, and 811 or 29.2% were born outside of Switzerland.

In 2008 there were 24 live births to Swiss citizens and 5 births to non-Swiss citizens, and in same time span there were 7 deaths of Swiss citizens and 7 non-Swiss citizen deaths. Ignoring immigration and emigration, the population of Swiss citizens increased by 17 while the foreign population decreased by 2. There were 15 Swiss men and 16 Swiss women who emigrated from Switzerland. At the same time, there were 6 non-Swiss men and 1 non-Swiss woman who immigrated from another country to Switzerland. The total Swiss population change in 2008 (from all sources, including moves across municipal borders) was a decrease of 15 and the non-Swiss population decreased by 2 people. This represents a population growth rate of -0.6%.

The age distribution of the population (as of 2000) is children and teenagers (0–19 years old) make up 23.7% of the population, while adults (20–64 years old) make up 67.8% and seniors (over 64 years old) make up 8.5%.

As of 2000, there were 1,208 people who were single and never married in the municipality. There were 1,302 married individuals, 97 widows or widowers and 175 individuals who are divorced.

As of 2000, there were 1,152 private households in the municipality, and an average of 2.3 persons per household. There were 340 households that consist of only one person and 52 households with five or more people. Out of a total of 1,192 households that answered this question, 28.5% were households made up of just one person and there were 3 adults who lived with their parents. Of the rest of the households, there are 302 married couples without children, 381 married couples with children There were 106 single parents with a child or children. There were 20 households that were made up of unrelated people and 40 households that were made up of some sort of institution or another collective housing.

In 2000 there were 133 single family homes (or 41.6% of the total) out of a total of 320 inhabited buildings. There were 89 multi-family buildings (27.8%), along with 72 multi-purpose buildings that were mostly used for housing (22.5%) and 26 other use buildings (commercial or industrial) that also had some housing (8.1%). Of the single family homes 33 were built before 1919, while 2 were built between 1990 and 2000. The greatest number of single family homes (38) were built between 1971 and 1980. The most multi-family homes (27) were built between 1971 and 1980 and the next most (18) were built between 1961 and 1970.

In 2000 there were 1,252 apartments in the municipality. The most common apartment size was 3 rooms of which there were 382. There were 132 single room apartments and 250 apartments with five or more rooms. Of these apartments, a total of 1,054 apartments (84.2% of the total) were permanently occupied, while 176 apartments (14.1%) were seasonally occupied and 22 apartments (1.8%) were empty. As of 2009, the construction rate of new housing units was 0.7 new units per 1000 residents. The vacancy rate for the municipality, in 2010, was 0%.

The historical population is given in the following chart:

== Politics ==
In the 2007 federal election the most popular party was the SVP which received 21.6% of the vote. The next three most popular parties were the SP (18.45%), the Green Party (15.81%) and the LPS Party (13.51%). In the federal election, a total of 727 votes were cast, and the voter turnout was 44.2%.

In the 2009 Grand Conseil election, there were a total of 1,636 registered voters of which 654 (40.0%) voted. The most popular party in the municipality for this election was the Libéral with 17.1% of the ballots. In the canton-wide election they received the highest proportion of votes. The second most popular party was the MCG (with 15.6%), they were third in the canton-wide election, while the third most popular party was the Les Verts (with 14.7%), they were second in the canton-wide election.

For the 2009 Conseil d'État election, there were a total of 1,628 registered voters of which 749 (46.0%) voted.

In 2011, all the municipalities held local elections, and in Perly-Certoux there were 17 spots open on the municipal council. There were a total of 2,075 registered voters of which 862 (41.5%) voted. Out of the 862 votes, there were 10 blank votes, 6 null or unreadable votes and 92 votes with a name that was not on the list.

== Economy ==
As of 2010, Perly-Certoux had an unemployment rate of 5%. As of 2008, there were 33 people employed in the primary economic sector and about 8 businesses involved in this sector. 564 people were employed in the secondary sector and there were 35 businesses in this sector. 641 people were employed in the tertiary sector, with 99 businesses in this sector. There were 1,557 residents of the municipality who were employed in some capacity, of which females made up 45.0% of the workforce.

In 2008 the total number of full-time equivalent jobs was 1,167. The number of jobs in the primary sector was 27, all of which were in agriculture. The number of jobs in the secondary sector was 552 of which 418 or (75.7%) were in manufacturing and 134 (24.3%) were in construction. The number of jobs in the tertiary sector was 588. In the tertiary sector; 185 or 31.5% were in wholesale or retail sales or the repair of motor vehicles, 11 or 1.9% were in the movement and storage of goods, 29 or 4.9% were in a hotel or restaurant, 176 or 29.9% were in the information industry, 4 or 0.7% were the insurance or financial industry, 123 or 20.9% were technical professionals or scientists, 22 or 3.7% were in education and 14 or 2.4% were in health care.

In 2000, there were 721 workers who commuted into the municipality and 1,346 workers who commuted away. The municipality is a net exporter of workers, with about 1.9 workers leaving the municipality for every one entering. About 19.8% of the workforce coming into Perly-Certoux are coming from outside Switzerland, while 0.0% of the locals commute out of Switzerland for work. Of the working population, 16.2% used public transportation to get to work, and 68.1% used a private car.

== Religion ==
From the 2000 census, 1,293 or 46.5% were Roman Catholic, while 506 or 18.2% belonged to the Swiss Reformed Church. Of the rest of the population, there were 11 members of an Orthodox church (or about 0.40% of the population), there were 2 individuals (or about 0.07% of the population) who belonged to the Christian Catholic Church, and there were 32 individuals (or about 1.15% of the population) who belonged to another Christian church. There were 4 individuals (or about 0.14% of the population) who were Jewish, and 55 (or about 1.98% of the population) who were Islamic. There were 3 individuals who were Buddhist and 2 individuals who belonged to another church. 655 (or about 23.54% of the population) belonged to no church, are agnostic or atheist, and 219 individuals (or about 7.87% of the population) did not answer the question.

== Education ==
In Perly-Certoux about 1,048 or (37.7%) of the population have completed non-mandatory upper secondary education, and 521 or (18.7%) have completed additional higher education (either university or a Fachhochschule). Of the 521 who completed tertiary schooling, 42.4% were Swiss men, 36.5% were Swiss women, 14.0% were non-Swiss men and 7.1% were non-Swiss women.

During the 2009-2010 school year there were a total of 594 students in the Perly-Certoux school system. The education system in the Canton of Geneva allows young children to attend two years of non-obligatory Kindergarten. During that school year, there were 48 children who were in a pre-kindergarten class. The canton's school system provides two years of non-mandatory kindergarten and requires students to attend six years of primary school, with some of the children attending smaller, specialized classes. In Perly-Certoux there were 84 students in kindergarten or primary school and 7 students were in the special, smaller classes. The secondary school program consists of three lower, obligatory years of schooling, followed by three to five years of optional, advanced schools. There were 84 lower secondary students who attended school in Perly-Certoux. There were 136 upper secondary students from the municipality along with 32 students who were in a professional, non-university track program. An additional 25 students attended a private school.

As of 2000, there were 34 students in Perly-Certoux who came from another municipality, while 265 residents attended schools outside the municipality.
