= Plan-les-Ouates =

- Municipality
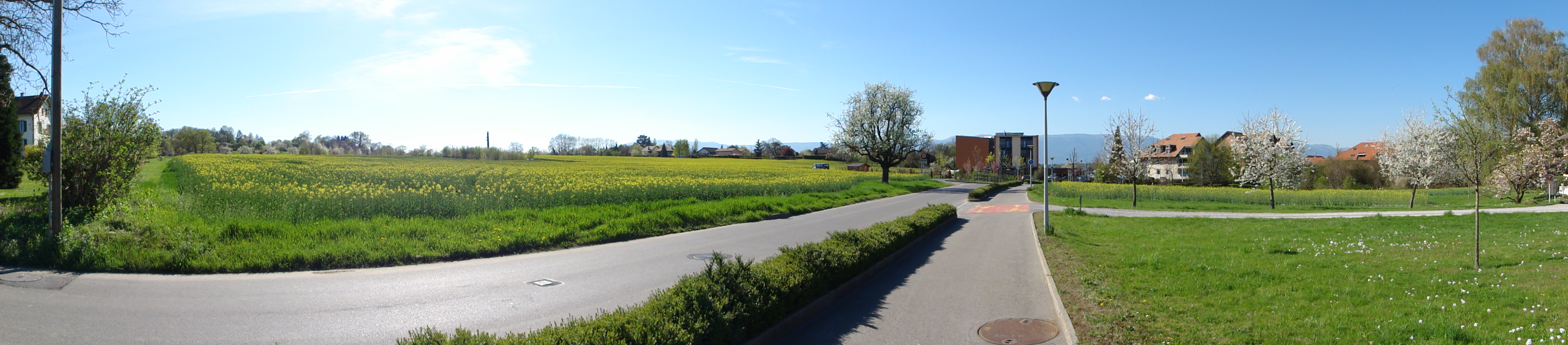

- Flag Coat of arms
- Location of Plan-les-Ouates
- Location within Switzerland Location within Canton of Geneva
- Coordinates: 46°10′N 06°07′E
- Country: Switzerland
- Canton: Geneva
- District: n.a.

Government
  - Mayor: Maire; Xavier Magnin

Area
  - Total: 5.86 km^{2} (2.26 sq mi)
- Elevation: 405 m (1,329 ft)

Population (December 2020)
  - Total: 10,601
  - Density: 1,810/km^{2} (4,690/sq mi)
- Time zone: UTC+01:00 (CET)
  - Summer (DST): UTC+02:00 (CEST)
- Postal code: 1228
- SFOS number: 6633
- ISO 3166 code: CH-GE
- Surrounded by: Bardonnex, Carouge, Confignon, Lancy, Onex, Perly-Certoux, Troinex
- Twin towns: Villefranche-sur-Mer (France), Birsfelden (Switzerland)
- Website: www.plan-les-ouates.ch

Plan-les-Ouates (French pronunciation: [plɑ̃ le wat]) is a municipality of the canton of Geneva in Switzerland.

== History ==
Plan-les-Ouates is first mentioned in 1537 as Plan-des-Vuattes. In 1851 it became an independent municipality when the municipality of Compesières dissolved itself and the municipalities of Bardonnex and Plan-les-Ouates were formed.

== Geography ==
Plan-les-Ouates has an area, as of 2009, of 5.86 square kilometers (2.26 sq mi). Of this area, 2.58 km^{2} (1.00 sq mi) or 44.0% is used for agricultural purposes, while 0.21 km^{2} (0.081 sq mi) or 3.6% is forested. Of the rest of the land, 2.99 km^{2} (1.15 sq mi) or 51.0% is settled (buildings or roads) and 0.03 km^{2} (7.4 acres) or 0.5% is unproductive land.

Of the built up area, industrial buildings made up 9.6% of the total area while housing and buildings made up 24.9% and transportation infrastructure made up 12.5%. Power and water infrastructure as well as other special developed areas made up 1.9% of the area while parks, green belts and sports fields made up 2.2%. Out of the forested land, 2.2% of the total land area is heavily forested and 1.4% is covered with orchards or small clusters of trees. Of the agricultural land, 30.2% is used for growing crops and 4.3% is pastures, while 9.6% is used for orchards or vine crops.

The municipality is located on the left bank of the Rhone river. It consists of the village of Plan-les-Ouates and the hamlets of Arare and Saconnex d'Arve.

The municipality of Plan-les-Ouates consists of the sub-sections or villages of ZIPLO, Les Cherpines, Les Voirets, Plan-les-Ouates - village, Le Sapey, Bois d'Humilly, Drize - La Chapelle, Saconnex d'Arve - Dessus, Champ-Gredin, Arare - Plein-Vent, Arare - La Gravière.

== Demographics ==
Largest groups of foreign residents 2013
Nationality	Amount	% total (population)
France	432	4.2
Portugal	408	4.0
Italy	318	3.1
Spain	184	1.8
Kosovo	104	1.0
Germany	85	0.8
UK	62	0.6
Belgium	53	0.5
Brazil	47	0.5
Serbia	45	0.4
Turkey	42	0.4
Netherlands	41	0.4
DR Congo	38	0.4
USA	34	0.3
Morocco	29	0.3

Plan-les-Ouates has a population (as of December 2020) of 10,601. As of 2008, 24.3% of the population are resident foreign nationals. Over the last 10 years (1999–2009 ) the population has changed at a rate of 58.5%. It has changed at a rate of 46.6% due to migration and at a rate of 11.3% due to births and deaths.

Most of the population (as of 2000) speaks French (5,890 or 86.6%), with German being second most common (286 or 4.2%) and Italian being third (151 or 2.2%). There is 1 person who speaks Romansh.

As of 2008, the gender distribution of the population was 48.6% male and 51.4% female. The population was made up of 3,638 Swiss men (36.1% of the population) and 1,258 (12.5%) non-Swiss men. There were 3,989 Swiss women (39.6%) and 1,182 (11.7%) non-Swiss women. Of the population in the municipality 1,129 or about 16.6% were born in Plan-les-Ouates and lived there in 2000. There were 2,547 or 37.4% who were born in the same canton, while 1,072 or 15.8% were born somewhere else in Switzerland, and 1,831 or 26.9% were born outside of Switzerland.

In 2008 there were 81 live births to Swiss citizens and 24 births to non-Swiss citizens, and in same time span there were 26 deaths of Swiss citizens and 3 non-Swiss citizen deaths. Ignoring immigration and emigration, the population of Swiss citizens increased by 55 while the foreign population increased by 21. There were 16 Swiss men and 34 Swiss women who emigrated from Switzerland. At the same time, there were 64 non-Swiss men and 41 non-Swiss women who immigrated from another country to Switzerland. The total Swiss population change in 2008 (from all sources, including moves across municipal borders) was an increase of 143 and the non-Swiss population increased by 106 people. This represents a population growth rate of 2.6%.

The age distribution of the population (as of 2000) is children and teenagers (0–19 years old) make up 28% of the population, while adults (20–64 years old) make up 61.4% and seniors (over 64 years old) make up 10.6%.

As of 2000, there were 2,902 people who were single and never married in the municipality. There were 3,273 married individuals, 235 widows or widowers and 394 individuals who are divorced.

As of 2000, there were 2,563 private households in the municipality, and an average of 2.6 persons per household. There were 641 households that consist of only one person and 199 households with five or more people. Out of a total of 2,633 households that answered this question, 24.3% were households made up of just one person and there were 19 adults who lived with their parents. Of the rest of the households, there are 642 married couples without children, 1,011 married couples with children There were 218 single parents with a child or children. There were 32 households that were made up of unrelated people and 70 households that were made up of some sort of institution or another collective housing.

In 2000 there were 993 single family homes (or 74.2% of the total) out of a total of 1,339 inhabited buildings. There were 201 multi-family buildings (15.0%), along with 102 multi-purpose buildings that were mostly used for housing (7.6%) and 43 other use buildings (commercial or industrial) that also had some housing (3.2%). Of the single family homes 99 were built before 1919, while 135 were built between 1990 and 2000. The greatest number of single family homes (237) were built between 1971 and 1980. The most multi-family homes (43) were built before 1919 and the next most (30) were built between 1996 and 2000.

In 2000 there were 2,640 apartments in the municipality. The most common apartment size was 4 rooms of which there were 812. There were 153 single room apartments and 877 apartments with five or more rooms. Of these apartments, a total of 2,382 apartments (90.2% of the total) were permanently occupied, while 225 apartments (8.5%) were seasonally occupied and 33 apartments (1.3%) were empty. As of 2009, the construction rate of new housing units was 1.6 new units per 1000 residents. The vacancy rate for the municipality, in 2010, was 0.11%.

The historical population is given in the following chart:

== Heritage sites of national significance ==
The Forte D’Arare House, the Patek Philippe SA Archives and the Vacheron Constantin Archives are listed as Swiss heritage site of national significance.

== Twin towns ==
Plan-les-Ouates is twinned with:

Sângeorgiu de Pădure, Romania	Villefranche sur Mer, France

== Politics ==
In the 2007 federal election the most popular party was the SVP which received 21.03% of the vote. The next three most popular parties were the Green Party (17.34%), the SP (15.91%) and the CVP (14.28%). In the federal election, a total of 2,594 votes were cast, and the voter turnout was 50.4%.

In the 2009 Grand Conseil election, there were a total of 5,361 registered voters of which 2,325 (43.4%) voted. The most popular party in the municipality for this election was the Les Verts with 15.4% of the ballots. In the canton-wide election they received the second highest proportion of votes. The second most popular party was the MCG (with 15.1%), they were third in the canton-wide election, while the third most popular party was the Libéral (with 13.5%), they were first in the canton-wide election.

For the 2009 Conseil d'Etat election, there were a total of 5,359 registered voters of which 2,690 (50.2%) voted.

In 2011, all the municipalities held local elections, and in Plan-les-Ouates there were 25 spots open on the municipal council. There were a total of 6,684 registered voters of which 2,927 (43.8%) voted. Out of the 2,927 votes, there were 9 blank votes, 21 null or unreadable votes and 312 votes with a name that was not on the list.

== Economy ==
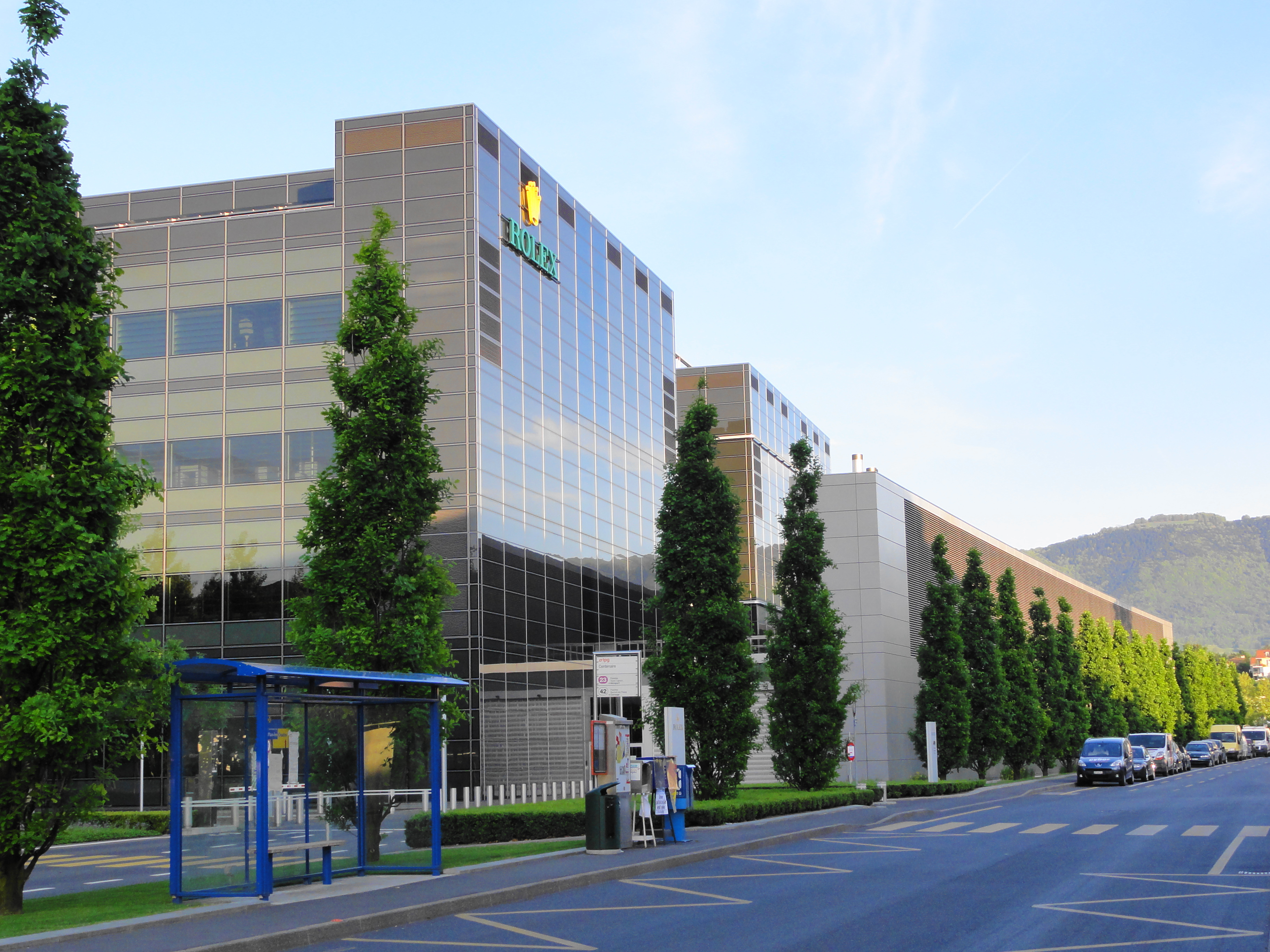
Rolex - Plan-les-Ouates

As of 2010, Plan-les-Ouates had an unemployment rate of 6.4%. As of 2008, there were 104 people employed in the primary economic sector and about 16 businesses involved in this sector. 7,209 people were employed in the secondary sector and there were 154 businesses in this sector. 4,290 people were employed in the tertiary sector, with 409 businesses in this sector. There were 3,395 residents of the municipality who were employed in some capacity, of which females made up 44.5% of the workforce.

In 2008 the total number of full-time equivalent jobs was 10,801. The number of jobs in the primary sector was 94, all of which were in agriculture. The number of jobs in the secondary sector was 7,043 of which 6,079 or (86.3%) were in manufacturing and 964 (13.7%) were in construction. The number of jobs in the tertiary sector was 3,664. In the tertiary sector; 1,217 or 33.2% were in wholesale or retail sales or the repair of motor vehicles, 235 or 6.4% were in the movement and storage of goods, 156 or 4.3% were in a hotel or restaurant, 392 or 10.7% were in the information industry, 81 or 2.2% were the insurance or financial industry, 613 or 16.7% were technical professionals or scientists, 233 or 6.4% were in education and 341 or 9.3% were in health care.

In 2000, there were 6,986 workers who commuted into the municipality and 2,800 workers who commuted away. The municipality is a net importer of workers, with about 2.5 workers entering the municipality for every one leaving. About 22.9% of the workforce coming into Plan-les-Ouates are coming from outside Switzerland, while 0.0% of the locals commute out of Switzerland for work. Of the working population, 18.7% used public transportation to get to work, and 59.6% used a private car.

== Religion ==
From the 2000 census, 3,027 or 44.5% were Roman Catholic, while 1,268 or 18.6% belonged to the Swiss Reformed Church. Of the rest of the population, there were 58 members of an Orthodox church (or about 0.85% of the population), there were 17 individuals (or about 0.25% of the population) who belonged to the Christian Catholic Church, and there were 120 individuals (or about 1.76% of the population) who belonged to another Christian church. There were 19 individuals (or about 0.28% of the population) who were Jewish, and 97 (or about 1.43% of the population) who were Islamic. There were 9 individuals who were Buddhist, 5 individuals who were Hindu and 11 individuals who belonged to another church. 1,707 (or about 25.09% of the population) belonged to no church, are agnostic or atheist, and 466 individuals (or about 6.85% of the population) did not answer the question.

== Education ==
In Plan-les-Ouates about 2,246 or (33.0%) of the population have completed non-mandatory upper secondary education, and 1,437 or (21.1%) have completed additional higher education (either university or a Fachhochschule). Of the 1,437 who completed tertiary schooling, 43.8% were Swiss men, 33.3% were Swiss women, 14.0% were non-Swiss men and 9.0% were non-Swiss women.

During the 2009-2010 school year there were a total of 2,716 students in the Plan-les-Ouates school system. The education system in the Canton of Geneva allows young children to attend two years of non-obligatory Kindergarten. During that school year, there were 272 children who were in a pre-kindergarten class. The canton's school system provides two years of non-mandatory kindergarten and requires students to attend six years of primary school, with some of the children attending smaller, specialized classes. In Plan-les-Ouates there were 428 students in kindergarten or primary school and 48 students were in the special, smaller classes. The secondary school program consists of three lower, obligatory years of schooling, followed by three to five years of optional, advanced schools. There were 428 lower secondary students who attended school in Plan-les-Ouates. There were 561 upper secondary students from the municipality along with 100 students who were in a professional, non-university track program. An additional 154 students attended a private school.

As of 2000, there were 151 students in Plan-les-Ouates who came from another municipality, while 814 residents attended schools outside the municipality.

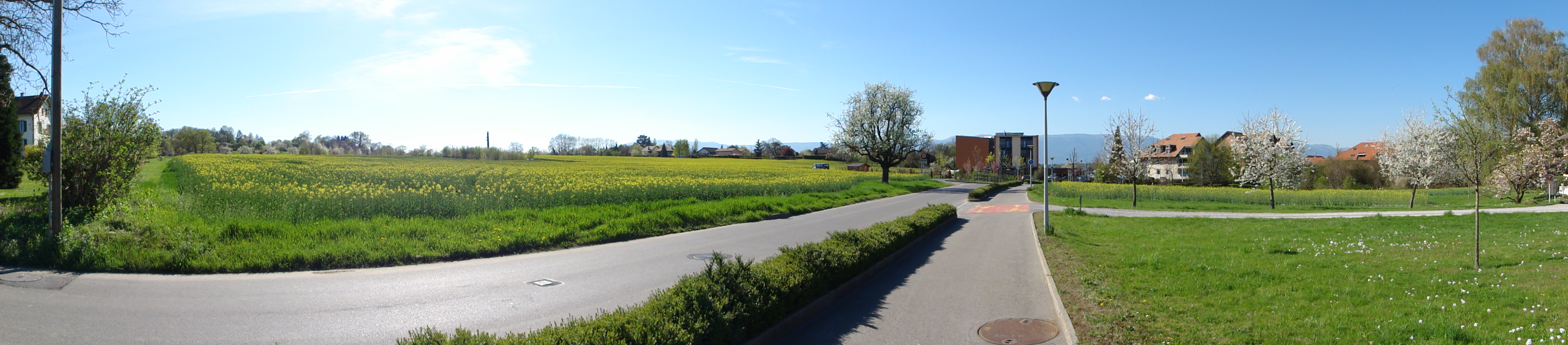
Plan-les-Ouates
