= A14 motorway (Switzerland) =

Motorway in Switzerland

Coordinates: 47.117343°N 8.360392°E

Route of the A14

Basic data
Total Length: ~20 km (12 mi)
Junctions

| A2 |
| (1) | Junction Rotsee A2 |
| (2) | Emmen Süd |
| | Rathausen (300 m) |
| (3) | Buchrain - planned |
| | Reuss |
| (4) | Gisikon |
| | Reussbrücke |
| | Reuss |
| (5) | Junction Rütihof / Rotkreuz A4 |
| A4 |

The A14 motorway, an Autobahn in central Switzerland, is a divided highway connecting the A2 with the A4, within the Canton of Lucerne.

The A14 is congruent with the National Road N14 and part of the main traffic artery between the Innerschweitz and the metropolitan area Zürich. It runs mostly along the Reuss (river), which it twice crosses. The second bridge on the Reuss is the second highest bridge in the Canton of Zug.
