= Gubrist Tunnel =

Road tunnel in Switzerland

Coordinates: 47°25′26″N 8°28′58″E

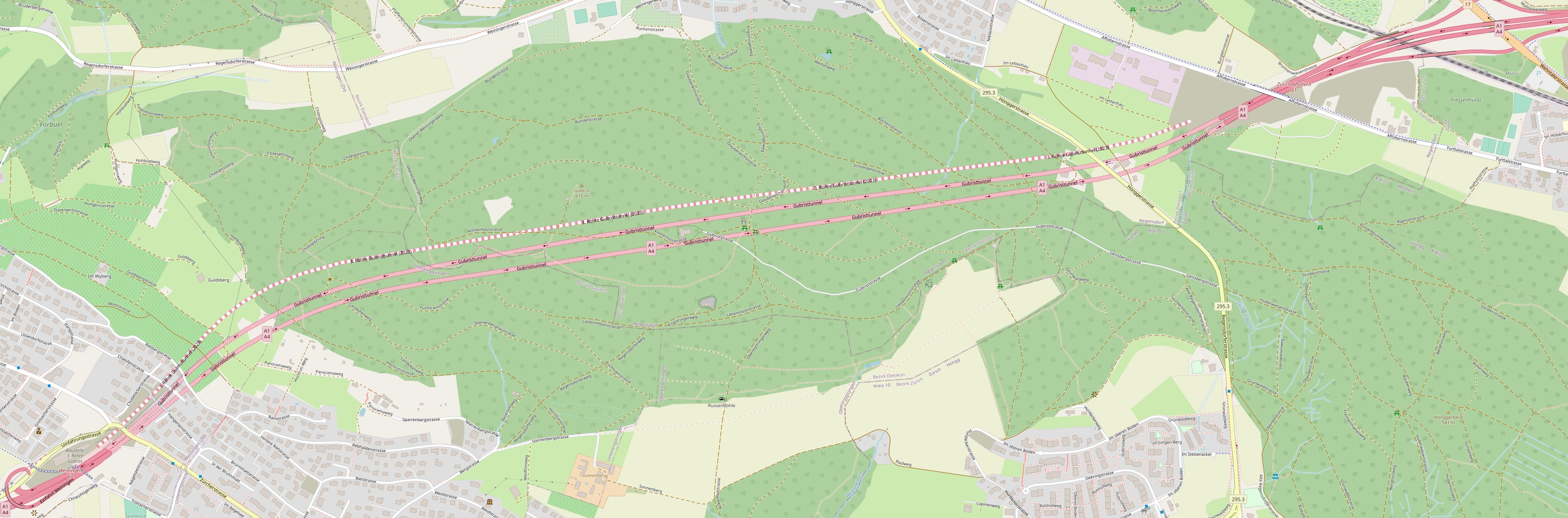
Map of Gubrist Tunnel in 2022 showing its two open tubes and the third, built, but not opened (2022)

The Gubrist Tunnel is a motorway tunnel in Switzerland. It lies to the north-west of the city of Zürich, and forms part of the A1 motorway, on its northern ring section around Zürich. The tunnel was completed in 1985, and is 3,273 metres (10,738 ft) in length.

The tunnel is named after the hill of Gubrist, which is nearby. In 1990, 63,000 cars used this tunnel daily; in 2014, that number had risen to 106,000, and in 2023, the tunnel conveyed 120,000 cars per day.

The tunnel forms part of the 'A1 Nordumfahrung' renovation plan covering the western entrance, the Gubrist Tunnel itself, and a further 10 kilometres (6.2 mi) of motorway west of the tunnel. The project will expand the motorway approaching the tunnel from its original four lanes (two in each direction) to six lanes (three in each direction). The major junctions immediately east (the Weiningen junction) and west (the Affoltern junction) of the tunnel will also be modernised. The project will cost in total 1.55 billion Swiss francs. Work started in 2014 and was scheduled to take nine years; in July 2023, the third tube was inaugurated. Construction was hampered by the COVID-19 pandemic. In addition, the nearby village of Weiningen fiercely opposed the plans and successfully appealed to the Federal Court for the tunnel to include a 100-metre (330 ft) fence at the end to mitigate the noise and pollution.

In 2012, the Gubrist Tunnel was rated as 'sufficient' (German: ausreichend) in a test of tunnel safety undertaken by the Touring Club Suisse and was the second-worst tunnel in the test.
