= Bardonnex =

- Municipality
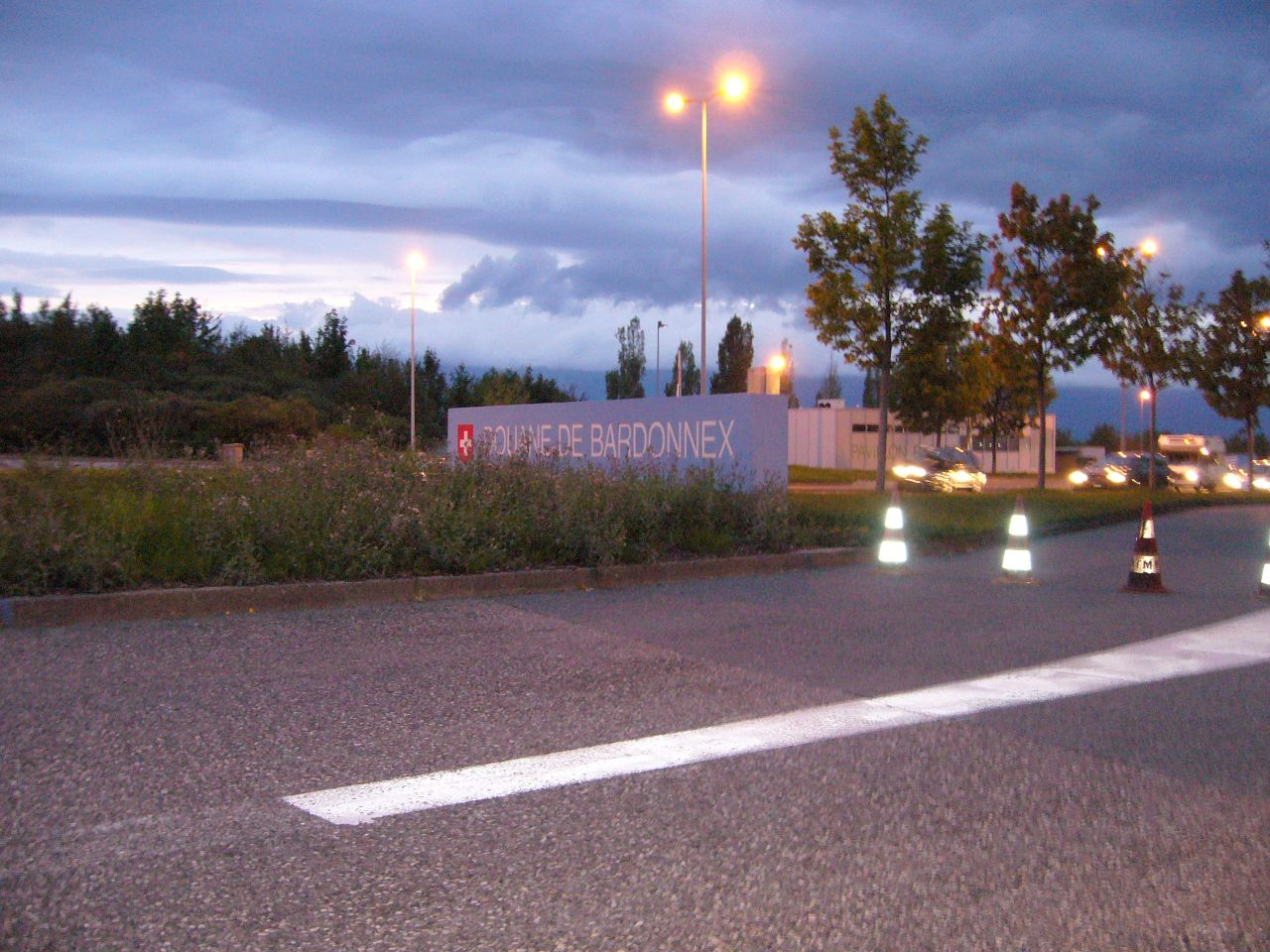

- Coat of arms
- Location of Bardonnex
- Location within Switzerland Location within Canton of Geneva
- Coordinates: 46°08′N 06°06′E
- Country: Switzerland
- Canton: Geneva
- District: n.a.

Government
  - Mayor: Maire

Area
  - Total: 5.00 km^{2} (1.93 sq mi)
- Elevation: 476 m (1,562 ft)

Population (December 2020)
  - Total: 2,396
  - Density: 479/km^{2} (1,240/sq mi)
- Time zone: UTC+01:00 (CET)
  - Summer (DST): UTC+02:00 (CEST)
- Postal code: 1257
- SFOS number: 6605
- ISO 3166 code: CH-GE
- Surrounded by: Archamps (FR-74), Bossey (FR-74), Collonges-sous-Salève (FR-74), Perly-Certoux, Plan-les-Ouates, Saint-Julien-en-Genevois (FR-74), Troinex
- Website: www.bardonnex.ch

Bardonnex is a municipality in the canton of Geneva in Switzerland.

== History ==
Bardonnex is first mentioned in 1153 as Bardonacum.

== Geography ==
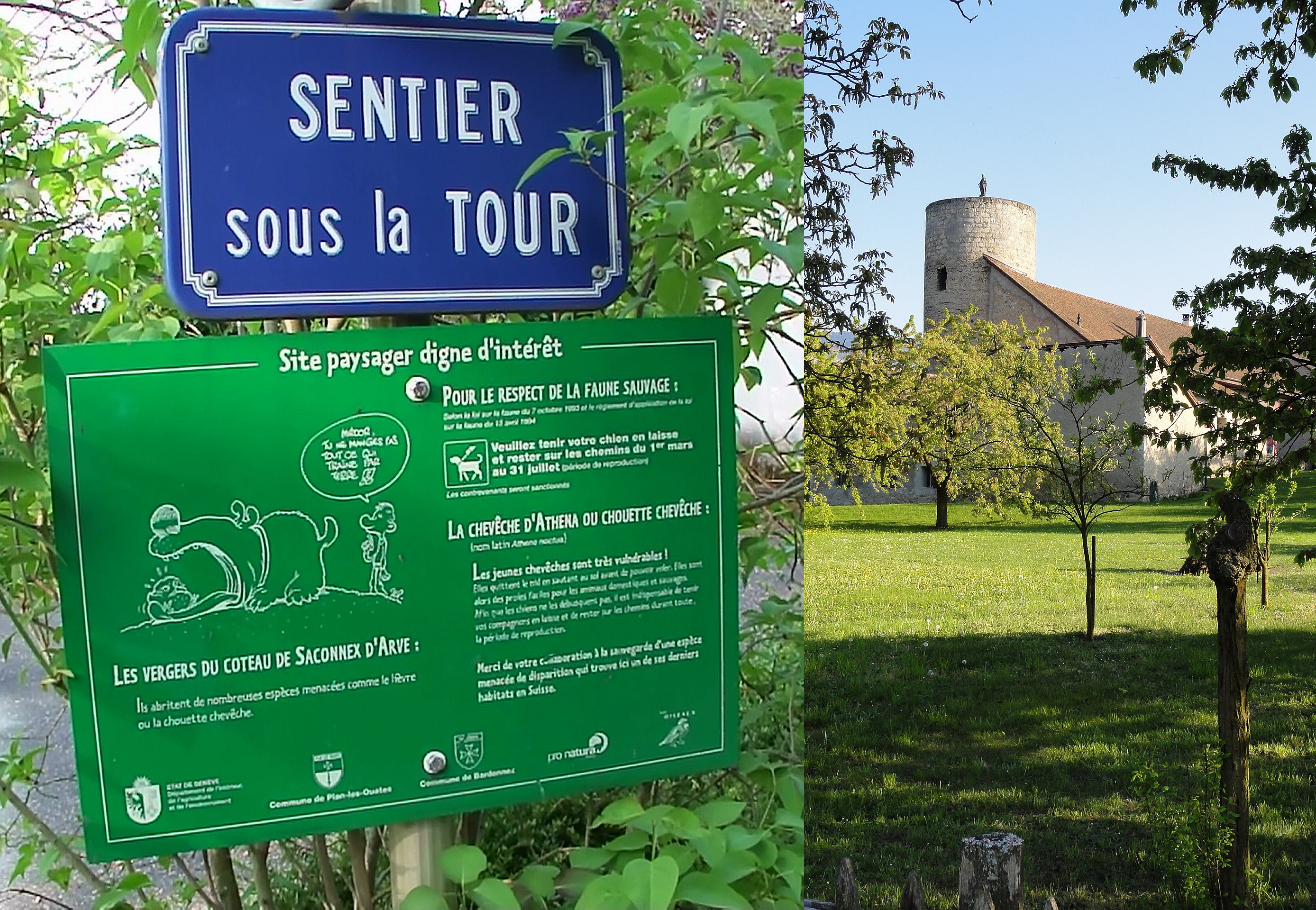
Sentier sous la Tour 46° 9' 37.8" N, 6° 7' 33" E

Bardonnex has an area, as of 2009, of 5 square kilometers (1.9 sq mi). Of this area, 3.68 km^{2} (1.42 sq mi) or 73.6% is used for agricultural purposes, while 0.17 km^{2} (0.066 sq mi) or 3.4% is forested. Of the rest of the land, 1.18 km^{2} (0.46 sq mi) or 23.6% is settled (buildings or roads).

Of the built up area, industrial buildings made up 1.6% of the total area while housing and buildings made up 9.6% and transportation infrastructure made up 7.4%. Power and water infrastructure as well as other special developed areas made up 3.8% of the area while parks, green belts and sports fields made up 1.2%. Out of the forested land, 0.8% of the total land area is heavily forested and 2.6% is covered with orchards or small clusters of trees. Of the agricultural land, 54.8% is used for growing crops and 4.6% is pastures, while 14.2% is used for orchards or vine crops.

The municipality is located in the south of the Canton, on the Swiss-French border. It consists of the village of Bardonnex and the hamlets of Charrot, Croix-de-Rozon (Border Crossing), Compesières, Landecy, La Mure and Cugny. In 1851 the community of Compesières was divided by the municipalities of Bardonnex and Plan-les-Ouates.

The municipality of Bardonnex consists of the sub-sections or villages of Ravières, Compesières, Surpierre, La Croix-de-Rozon, Landecy, Charrot and Bardonnex - village.

== Coat of arms ==
The blazon of the municipal coat of arms is Gules a Maltese Cross Argent. This comes from the Order of St John which had a commandery here starting in the 13th century.

== Demographics ==
Largest groups of foreign residents 2013
Nationality	Amount	% total (population)
France	118	5.3
Portugal	95	4.3
Italy	61	2.7
Spain	35	1.6
UK	31	1.4
Kosovo	30	1.3
Colombia	15	0.7
USA	14	0.6
Belgium	13	0.6
Germany	12	0.5

Bardonnex has a population (as of December 2020) of 2,396. As of 2008, 21.8% of the population are resident foreign nationals. Over the last 10 years (1999–2009 ) the population has changed at a rate of 5.8%. It has changed at a rate of -1.1% due to migration and at a rate of 6.1% due to births and deaths.

Most of the population (as of 2000) speaks French (1,788 or 85.4%), with Portuguese being second most common (76 or 3.6%) and English being third (63 or 3.0%). There is 1 person who speaks Romansh.

As of 2008, the gender distribution of the population was 49.7% male and 50.3% female. The population was made up of 816 Swiss men (37.0% of the population) and 281 (12.7%) non-Swiss men. There were 857 Swiss women (38.8%) and 252 (11.4%) non-Swiss women. Of the population in the municipality 477 or about 22.8% were born in Bardonnex and lived there in 2000. There were 650 or 31.0% who were born in the same canton, while 281 or 13.4% were born somewhere else in Switzerland, and 611 or 29.2% were born outside of Switzerland.

In 2008 there were 24 live births to Swiss citizens and 4 births to non-Swiss citizens, and in same time span there were 12 deaths of Swiss citizens and 3 non-Swiss citizen deaths. Ignoring immigration and emigration, the population of Swiss citizens increased by 12 while the foreign population increased by 1. There were 5 Swiss men and 10 Swiss women who emigrated from Switzerland. At the same time, there were 19 non-Swiss men and 6 non-Swiss women who immigrated from another country to Switzerland. The total Swiss population change in 2008 (from all sources, including moves across municipal borders) was an increase of 17 and the non-Swiss population increased by 18 people. This represents a population growth rate of 1.6%. The age distribution of the population (as of 2000) is children and teenagers (0–19 years old) make up 26% of the population, while adults (20–64 years old) make up 64.9% and seniors (over 64 years old) make up 9.2%.

As of 2000, there were 887 people who were single and never married in the municipality. There were 1,024 married individuals, 61 widows or widowers and 122 individuals who are divorced.

As of 2000, there were 803 private households in the municipality, and an average of 2.5 persons per household. There were 210 households that consist of only one person and 48 households with five or more people. Out of a total of 835 households that answered this question, 25.1% were households made up of just one person and there were 4 adults who lived with their parents. Of the rest of the households, there are 203 married couples without children, 305 married couples with children There were 69 single parents with a child or children. There were 12 households that were made up of unrelated people and 32 households that were made up of some sort of institution or another collective housing.

In 2000 there were 202 single family homes (or 55.8% of the total) out of a total of 362 inhabited buildings. There were 72 multi-family buildings (19.9%), along with 70 multi-purpose buildings that were mostly used for housing (19.3%) and 18 other use buildings (commercial or industrial) that also had some housing (5.0%). Of the single family homes 80 were built before 1919, while 25 were built between 1990 and 2000.

In 2000 there were 846 apartments in the municipality. The most common apartment size was 4 rooms of which there were 262. There were 38 single room apartments and 255 apartments with five or more rooms. Of these apartments, a total of 749 apartments (88.5% of the total) were permanently occupied, while 72 apartments (8.5%) were seasonally occupied and 25 apartments (3.0%) were empty. As of 2009, the construction rate of new housing units was 3.2 new units per 1000 residents. The vacancy rate for the municipality, in 2010, was 0.56%.

The historical population is given in the following chart:

== Heritage sites of national significance ==
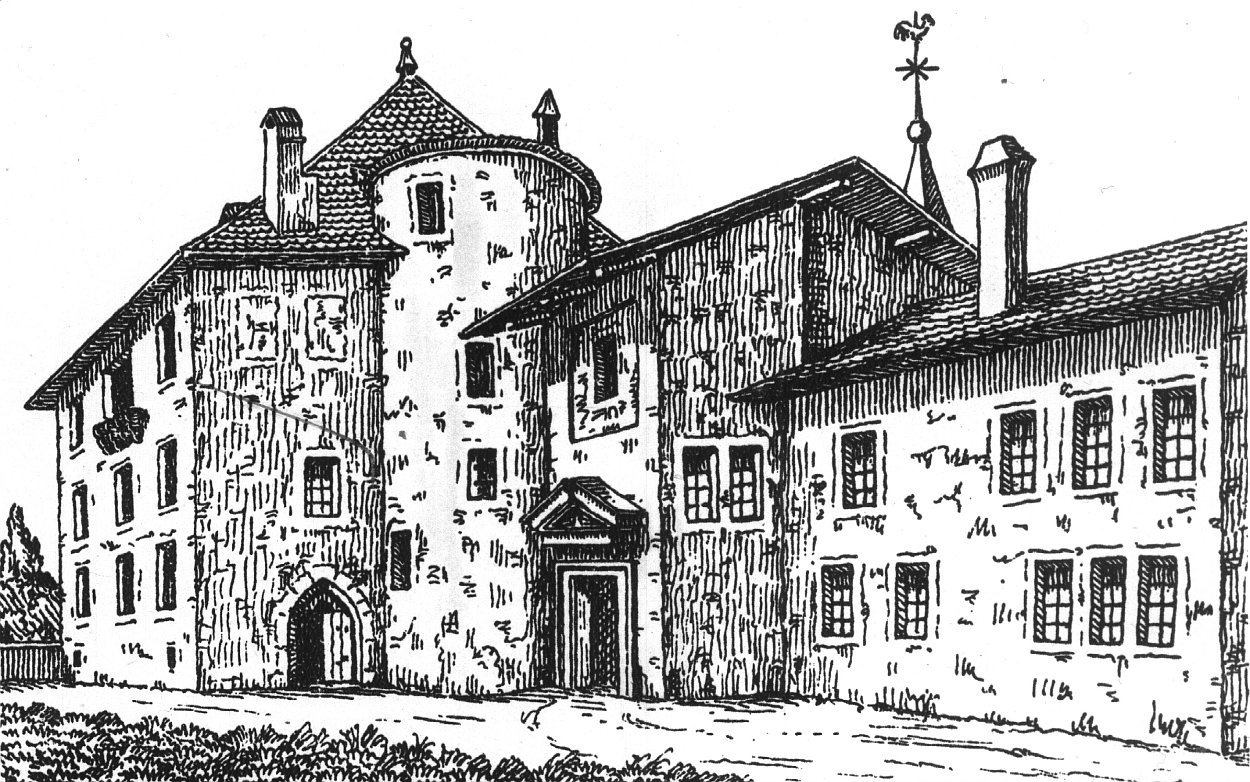
Compesières in 1840

The Compesières Commandry and the museum of the Order of Malta and the Domaine Micheli in Landecy are listed as Swiss heritage site of national significance. The village of Landecy and the Compesières site are part of the Inventory of Swiss Heritage Sites.

== Politics ==
In the 2007 federal election the most popular party was the CVP which received 23.48% of the vote. The next three most popular parties were the SVP (18.26%), the Green Party (16.03%) and the SP (11.17%). In the federal election, a total of 740 votes were cast, and the voter turnout was 56.8%.

In the 2009 Grand Conseil election, there were a total of 1,320 registered voters of which 689 (52.2%) voted. The most popular party in the municipality for this election was the PDC with 18.8% of the ballots. In the canton-wide election they received the fifth highest proportion of votes. The second most popular party was the MCG (with 18.6%), they were third in the canton-wide election, while the third most popular party was the Les Verts (with 13.5%), they were second in the canton-wide election.

For the 2009 Conseil d'État election, there were a total of 1,318 registered voters of which 772 (58.6%) voted.

In 2011, all the municipalities held local elections, and in Bardonnex there were 17 spots open on the municipal council. There were a total of 1,548 registered voters of which 865 (55.9%) voted. Out of the 865 votes, there were 11 blank votes, 1 null or unreadable votes and 91 votes with a name that was not on the list.

== Economy ==
As of 2010, Bardonnex had an unemployment rate of 4.7%. As of 2008, there were 88 people employed in the primary economic sector and about 18 businesses involved in this sector. 139 people were employed in the secondary sector and there were 20 businesses in this sector. 204 people were employed in the tertiary sector, with 50 businesses in this sector. There were 1,122 residents of the municipality who were employed in some capacity, of which females made up 45.0% of the workforce.

In 2008 the total number of full-time equivalent jobs was 384. The number of jobs in the primary sector was 75, all of which were in agriculture. The number of jobs in the secondary sector was 133 of which 88 or (66.2%) were in manufacturing and 45 (33.8%) were in construction. The number of jobs in the tertiary sector was 176. In the tertiary sector; 19 or 10.8% were in wholesale or retail sales or the repair of motor vehicles, 26 or 14.8% were in the movement and storage of goods, 23 or 13.1% were in a hotel or restaurant, 2 or 1.1% were in the information industry, 1 was the insurance or financial industry, 22 or 12.5% were technical professionals or scientists, 11 or 6.3% were in education and 2 or 1.1% were in health care.

In 2000, there were 292 workers who commuted into the municipality and 929 workers who commuted away. The municipality is a net exporter of workers, with about 3.2 workers leaving the municipality for every one entering. About 15.1% of the workforce coming into Bardonnex are coming from outside Switzerland, while 0.2% of the locals commute out of Switzerland for work. Of the working population, 16.5% used public transportation to get to work, and 63.6% used a private car.

== Religion ==
From the 2000 census, 937 or 44.7% were Roman Catholic, while 335 or 16.0% belonged to the Swiss Reformed Church. Of the rest of the population, there were 10 members of an Orthodox church (or about 0.48% of the population), and there were 46 individuals (or about 2.20% of the population) who belonged to another Christian church. There were 5 individuals (or about 0.24% of the population) who were Jewish, and 26 (or about 1.24% of the population) who were Islamic. There were 2 individuals who were Buddhist and 4 individuals who belonged to another church. 561 (or about 26.79% of the population) belonged to no church, are agnostic or atheist, and 168 individuals (or about 8.02% of the population) did not answer the question.

== Education ==
In Bardonnex about 643 or (30.7%) of the population have completed non-mandatory upper secondary education, and 435 or (20.8%) have completed additional higher education (either university or a Fachhochschule). Of the 435 who completed tertiary schooling, 41.4% were Swiss men, 38.2% were Swiss women, 13.1% were non-Swiss men and 7.4% were non-Swiss women.

During the 2009–2010 school year there were a total of 443 students in the Bardonnex school system. The education system in the Canton of Geneva allows young children to attend two years of non-obligatory Kindergarten. During that school year, there were 34 children who were in a pre-kindergarten class. The canton's school system provides two years of non-mandatory kindergarten and requires students to attend six years of primary school, with some of the children attending smaller, specialized classes. In Bardonnex there were 66 students in kindergarten or primary school and 4 students were in the special, smaller classes. The secondary school program consists of three lower, obligatory years of schooling, followed by three to five years of optional, advanced schools. There were 66 lower secondary students who attended school in Bardonnex. There were 119 upper secondary students from the municipality along with 11 students who were in a professional, non-university track program. An additional 58 students attended a private school.

As of 2000, there were 13 students in Bardonnex who came from another municipality, while 206 residents attended schools outside the municipality.
