= Zehender =

Zehender is a surname. Notable people with the surname include:

- August Zehender (1903–1945), German World War II officer
- Daniel Zehender (died 1500), Roman Catholic prelate
- Gabriel Zehender, German painter and printer
- Marquard Zehender (1542 – 1610 or 1611), Bernese politician
- Marquard Zehender (1581 – c. 1638), Bernese politician
- Samuel Zehender (1529–1564), Bernese soldier and politician
- Carl Wilhelm von Zehender (1819–1916), German ophthalmologist

== See also ==
- Zehender family
