= Marquard Zehender =

Marquard Zehender may refer to:

- Marquard Zehender (politician, born 1542) (1542 – 1610 or 1611), Bernese politician and bailiff of Nyon, Aigle, and Lausanne
- Marquard Zehender (politician, born 1581) (1581 – c. 1638), Bernese politician and treasurer of the French-speaking lands (Welschseckelmeister), son of the above
