= A16 motorway (Switzerland) =

Motorway in Switzerland

Coordinates: 47.366692°N 7.185168°E

A16

- Location of the A16 in Switzerland

Route information
- Length: 84 km (52 mi)

Location
- Country: Switzerland

Highway system
- Transport in Switzerland; Motorways

The A16, a motorway in north-central Switzerland, is a divided freeway connecting the border to France to the A5 motorway, 84 kilometres (52 mi) to the south on the Swiss Plateau.

The A16 motorway is a long, winding corridor that crosses the Jura Mountains from the Canton of Jura through part of the Bernese Jura area, to the flat part of the canton of Bern on the Swiss Plateau. Therefore, it is called Transjurane. It is congruent with the National Highway N16 and following its anticipated completion around 2020–2030, it will connect the French motorway network with the rest of the Swiss national road network. The extension provides for both four-lane standard (highway) and two-lane sections of "express roads" (Autostrasse). In 2014, there were approximately 71 km (84%) of roadway in operation, other sections were under construction or in planning.

== Route description ==
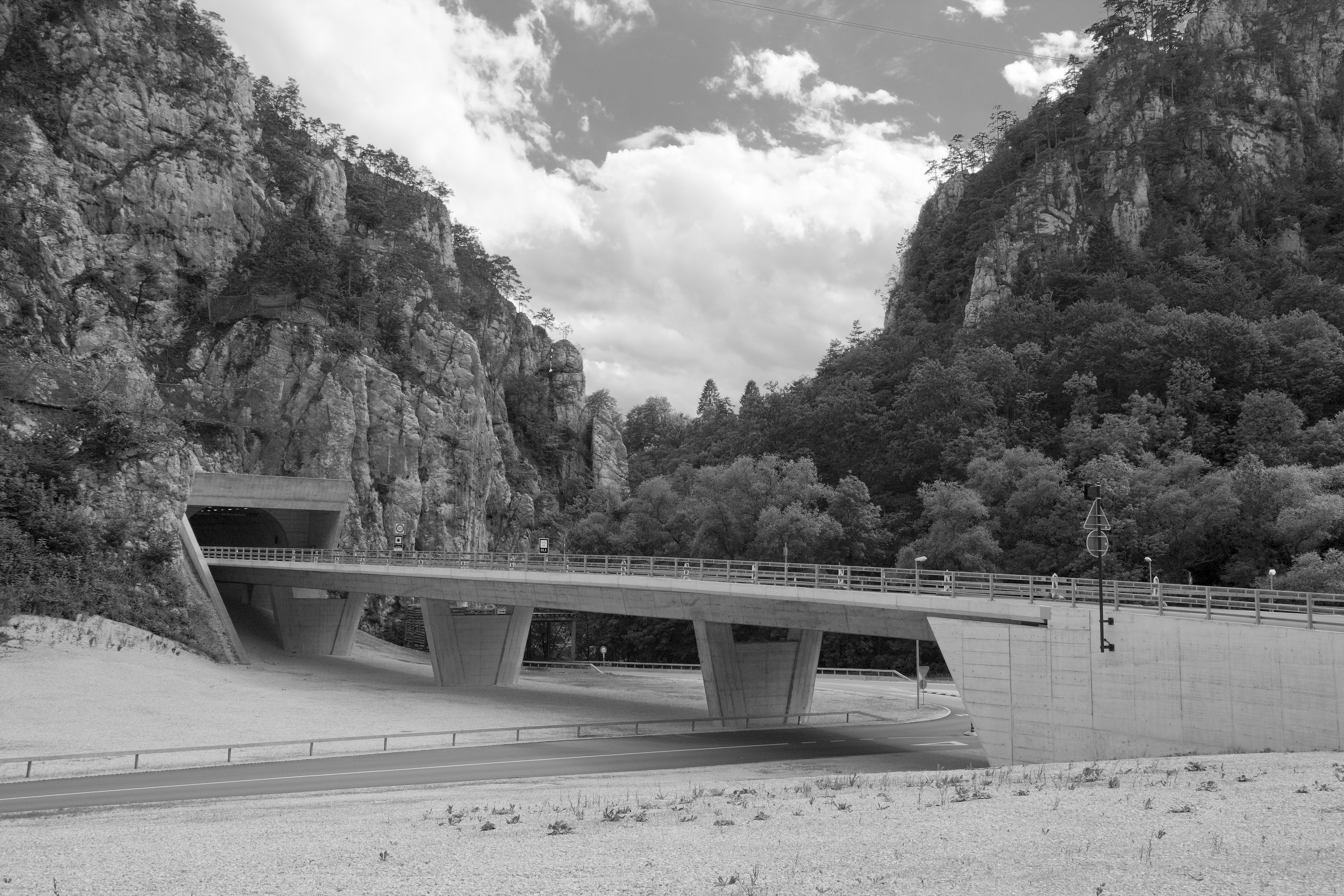
Bridge Choindez

The A16 starts at Boncourt in the Ajoie at the border between Switzerland and France. It runs south across the Ajoie plateau to Porrentruy, where it veers to the east. It crosses the northern Jura chains in Saint-Ursanne through two long tunnels, and reaches Glovelier, on the plateau of Delémont. After bypassing that city, the A16 turns south again, and follows the course of the Birse via Moutier and Court until Tavannes. Upon crossing Col de Pierre Pertuis through tunnels, the A16 follows the valley of the Suze (German:Schüss). It divides itself into a double lane road with separate downhill and uphill traffic on either side of the gorge of Taubenloch. It then reaches, the level of the Swiss Plateau east of Biel/Bienne, connecting to the A5.

== Status of construction ==
The following sections are in operation:

- Biel (Bözingenfeld) - La Heutte: Applies from entering Biel-North officially as a third-class national highway, because the section also supports bicycles and tractors. In each direction two lanes are almost continuously present. The running carriageway is separated, one on the west, the other on the eastern valley slope, the latter being largely the main track in use since 1965.
- La Heutte - Tavannes: route with standard highway, opened November 1997.
- Delémont - Porrentruy: Narrow highway with emergency stopping bays but without paved emergency lane; the tunnels of Mont Terri and Mont Russelin have one lane in each direction. The opening of the route took place in November 1998, with bypasses of Delémont and Porrentruy (each with standard highway) in September 2005.
- Moutier-North opened up to Choindez (Canton boundary BE / JU), November 2007.
- Court - Moutier-Nord: Motorway standard section Moutier-Sud to Moutier-Nord opened in November 2011. Mostly one lane in each direction remainder opened in November 2013.
- Porrentruy-Ouest - Bure: One lane each direction will be created initially; four-lane opened August 2014.
- Bure - Boncourt: Opened November 2011.
- Tavannes - Loveresse: The two-lane stretch opened November 2012.
- Loveresse - Court: With a 4.5 km stretch of standard highway, opened in April 2017.
- District boundary BE / JU - Delémont-Est: This two-lane section was initially scheduled to open in 2016.

Because of the current financial constraints, the Swiss Federal Government can postpone most of the works on new sections. The connection of the A16 to the A36 motorway in France (Mulhouse - Dijon) between Montbéliard and Belfort is to be completed within a time horizon of 2025–2030.

== Costs ==
Along its course, the A16 had many engineering structures, mainly tunnels but also some bridges. Therefore, the A16 was one of the most expensive road projects in Switzerland. For the whole line, a total cost of 5.6 billion Swiss francs is estimated.

== Tunnels ==
Because of the difficult terrain in the area of the Jura Mountains, the construction of numerous tunnels was necessary to pass underneath the various Jura chains. The main tunnels (from north to south) with a length of more than 1 kilometre (0.62 mi) are:

- Tunnel de Bure (3,027 metres or 9,931 feet)
- Tunnel du Banné (1,086 metres or 3,563 feet, Bypass Porrentruy)
- Tunnel de la Perche (1,027 metres or 3,369 feet, Bypass Porrentruy)
- Tunnel du Mont Terri (4,068 metres or 13,346 feet)
- Tunnel du Mont Russelin (3,550 metres or 11,650 feet)
- Tunnel de Choindez (3,200 metres or 10,500 feet, Bypass Schlucht von Choindez)
- Tunnel du Raimeux (3,211 metres or 10,535 feet, Bypass der Gorges de Moutier)
- Tunnel de Moutier (1,191 metres or 3,907 feet, Bypass Moutier)
- Tunnel de Graitery (2,420 metres or 7,940 feet, Bypass Schlucht von Court)
- Tunnel Sous le Mont (1,210 metres or 3,970 feet, Bypass Tavannes)
- Tunnel de Pierre Pertuis (2,208 metres or 7,244 feet)

There are 16 more tunnels that are less than 1 kilometre (0.62 mi) in length and were partly excavated in open pits. Some tunnels have been built to protect the residents of nearby villages and hamlets from the noise emissions.

== History ==
The A16 was not one from the start to the national motorway network in Switzerland, although there were initial projects of Jura rapid-traverse between Biel and Belfort, as early as 1964. The inclusion of the A16 in the plan of the national road network came in 1984, after the population had approved construction in the Canton of Jura, with a large majority (71%). The highway should be the favored new project of the Jura and the Ajoie. The efficient transport corridor is to ensure, after completion, a much faster connection to the rest of Switzerland. Flora Ruchat-Roncati and Renato Salvi of ETH Zurich won the competition to design the highway in 1988.

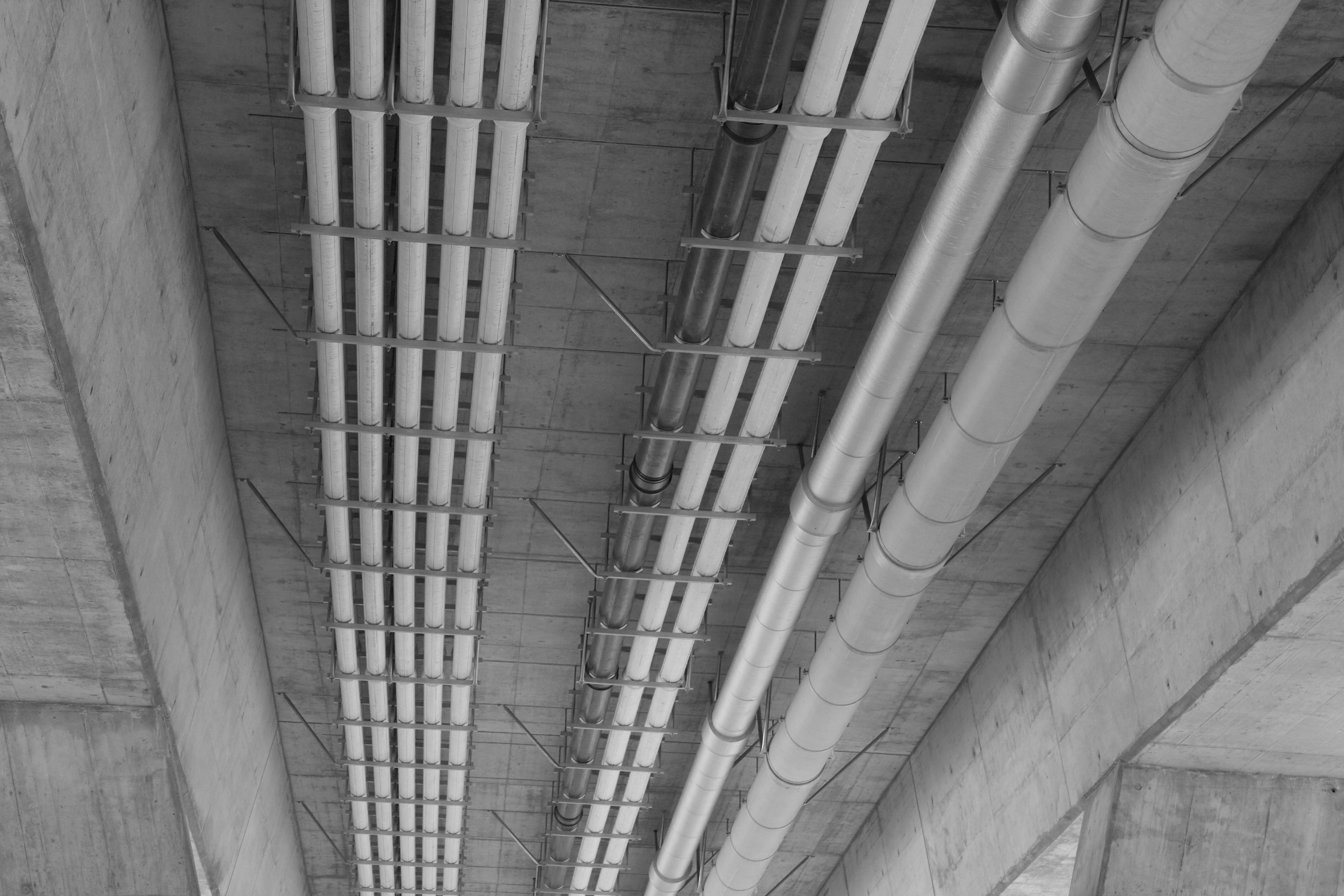
Factory bundle of pipes under the highway bridge at Choindez

Even after entering the national motorway network, there was the part of environmentalists strong opposition to the project. In the context of the so-called Clover Initiative, the construction of the A16 should be submitted to the entire Swiss population to vote. Due to the high acceptance of the project in the affected regions, the request was withdrawn before a vote on other controversial motorway cuts (in April 1990).

== Paleontology ==
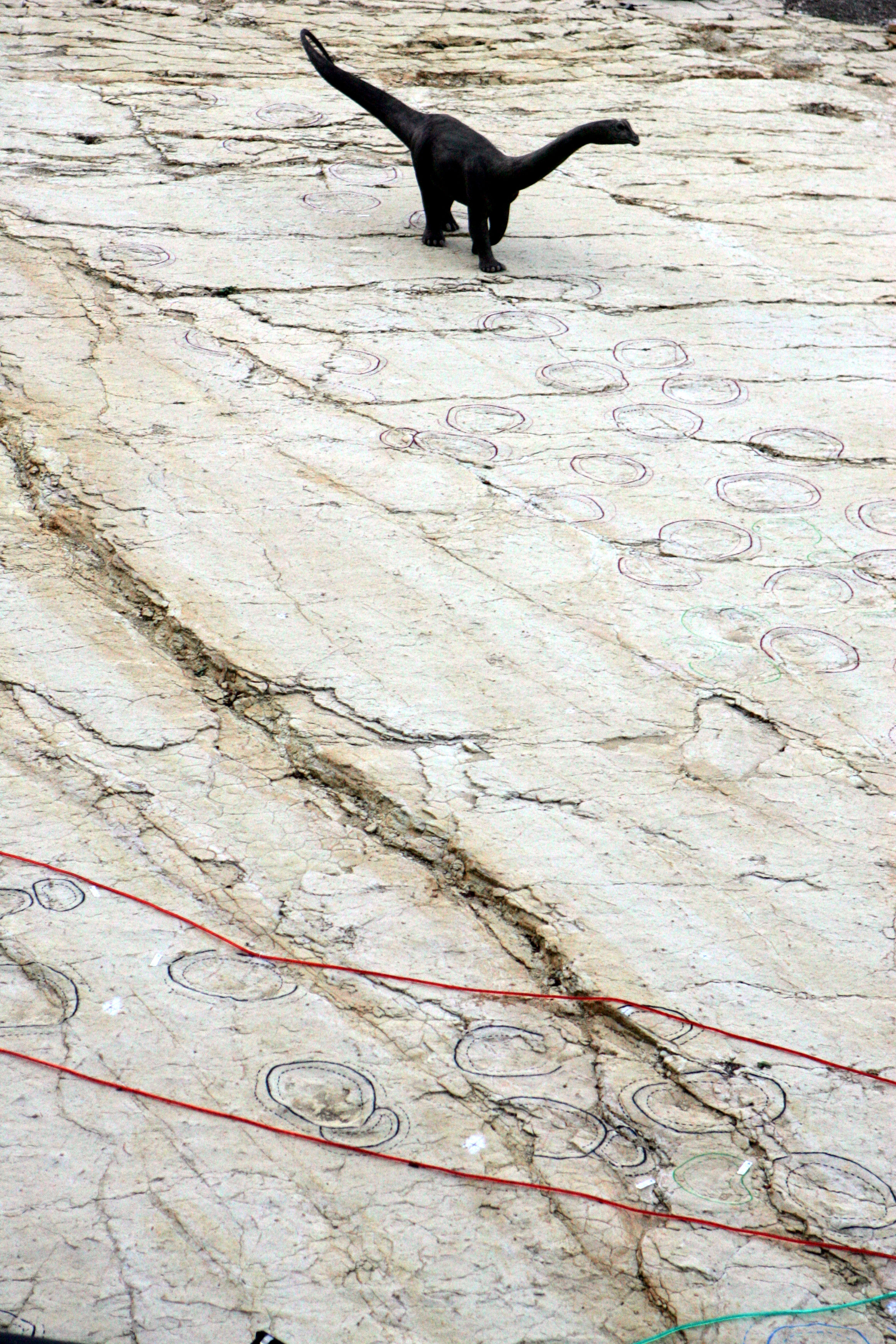

During the construction work on the A16, in the vicinity of Courtedoux, workers found a slab with about 500 footprints of dinosaurs, which used to live in the area about 150 million years ago.

== Junction list ==
Junctions

N19	France
Motorway A16
	Border Delle/Boncourt
(1)	Boncourt
	Tunnel
(2)	Bure
(3)	Chevenez
(4)	Porrentruy-Ouest
(5)	Porrentruy-Est
(6)	Courgenay
	Tunnel du Mont Terri (4100 m)
(7)	Saint-Ursanne
	Tunnel du Mont-Russelin (3600 m)
(8)	Glovelier
(9)	Bassecourt
(10)	Delémont-Ouest
(11)	Delémont-Est
Autobahn end	(until 2012)
Autostrasse
	Tunnel - in work until 2012
(12)	Choindez - in work until 2012
Autostrassen end	(until 2012)
Autostrassen end	(until 2008)
Autobahn
(13)	Moutier-Nord - in work until 2008
	Tunnel - in work until 2008
(14)	Moutier-Sud - in work until 2008
Autobahn end	(from 2008 to 2011)
Autostrasse
	Tunnel - planned until 2011
(15)	Court - planned until 2011
Autobahn
	Tunnel - planned until 2015
	Tunnel - planned until 2015
(16)	Loveresse
Autostrasse
	Tunnel - planned until 2011
Autobahn
Autobahn end	(until 2011)
(17)	Tavannes
	Tunnel de Pierre Pertuis (2100 m)
(18)	Sonceboz
(18)	Sonceboz
(19)	La Heutte
Autobahn end
Hauptstrasse N6
	Strassenteilung
	östl. Strasse:
(20)	Péry
(21)	Zone Industrielle
(22)	Frinvillier
	westl. Strasse:
(22)	Frinvillier
	Zusammenkunft der beiden Strassen
Autobahn end
(23)	Biel/Bienne
(24)	Junction Kreisel Bözingenfeld
A5
