= Speed limits in Switzerland =

The general speed limit in Switzerland is 80 km/h (50 mph) outside and 50 km/h (31 mph) inside build-up areas. These limits were introduced in 1984 to protect the environment. On the motorways of Switzerland the limit is 120 km/h (75 mph). The limit on the similar autostrassen is 100 km/h (62 mph). There are lower limits for trucks and vehicles with trailers.

== History ==
Sign „Richtgeschwindigkeit“ (advisory speed limit), used 1965-1973

Here is a timeline of speed limits: All limits are in km/h.

Year of introduction	City	Highways (rural)	Expressways (Autostrassen)	Motorways (Autobahnen)
1904	10 km/h	30 km/h	-	
1914	18 km/h	40 km/h	-	
1932	limits abolished		-	
June 1, 1959	60 km/h	none (Richtgeschwindigkeit since summer 1966)		
January 1, 1973	60 km/h	100 km/h (may be raised to 120 km/h by Cantons)		none (advisory speed limit)
November 17, 1973	60 km/h	100 km/h (may be raised to 120 km/h by Cantons)		100 km/h
March 14, 1974	60 km/h	100 km/h (may be raised to 120 km/h by Cantons)		130 km/h
January 1, 1977	60 km/h	100 km/h		130 km/h
January 1, 1984	50 km/h	80 km/h	80 km/h (Note: Like before, there was no special default limit set for autostrasses, but most of them had a posted speed limit of 100 km/h.) de facto 100 km/h	120 km/h
December 20, 1989	50 km/h	80 km/h	de jure 100 km/h	120 km/h

== See also ==
- Road Traffic Act (Switzerland)
