= EasyDriver =

Swiss driving license software

- Developers: Furrer & Partner AG (sold to Pixelpark AG in 2000); Verlag Heinrich Vogel
- Release: 1993
- Operating system: Microsoft Windows
- Type: driving license
- Website: easydriver.ch

EasyDriver is a popular Swiss driving license software introduced in 1993. Originally produced by Furrer & Partner AG (later sold to Pixelpark AG in 2000), since it passed into the hands of the German company it has also been published by Verlag Heinrich Vogel. It was initially distributed on floppy disk and later on CD-ROM. This program offers a series of questions and answers for the driving theory test, games, animations, exercises, a dictionary with all Swiss road signs, and is available in four languages: German, French, Italian, English. A driving theory manual in each language is also included in the software package. Recently EasyDriver is also a website for driving schools.
