= Rüfenacht =

Locality enclosed in the municipality of Worb, Switzerland

Coordinates: 46.92968°N 7.53121°E

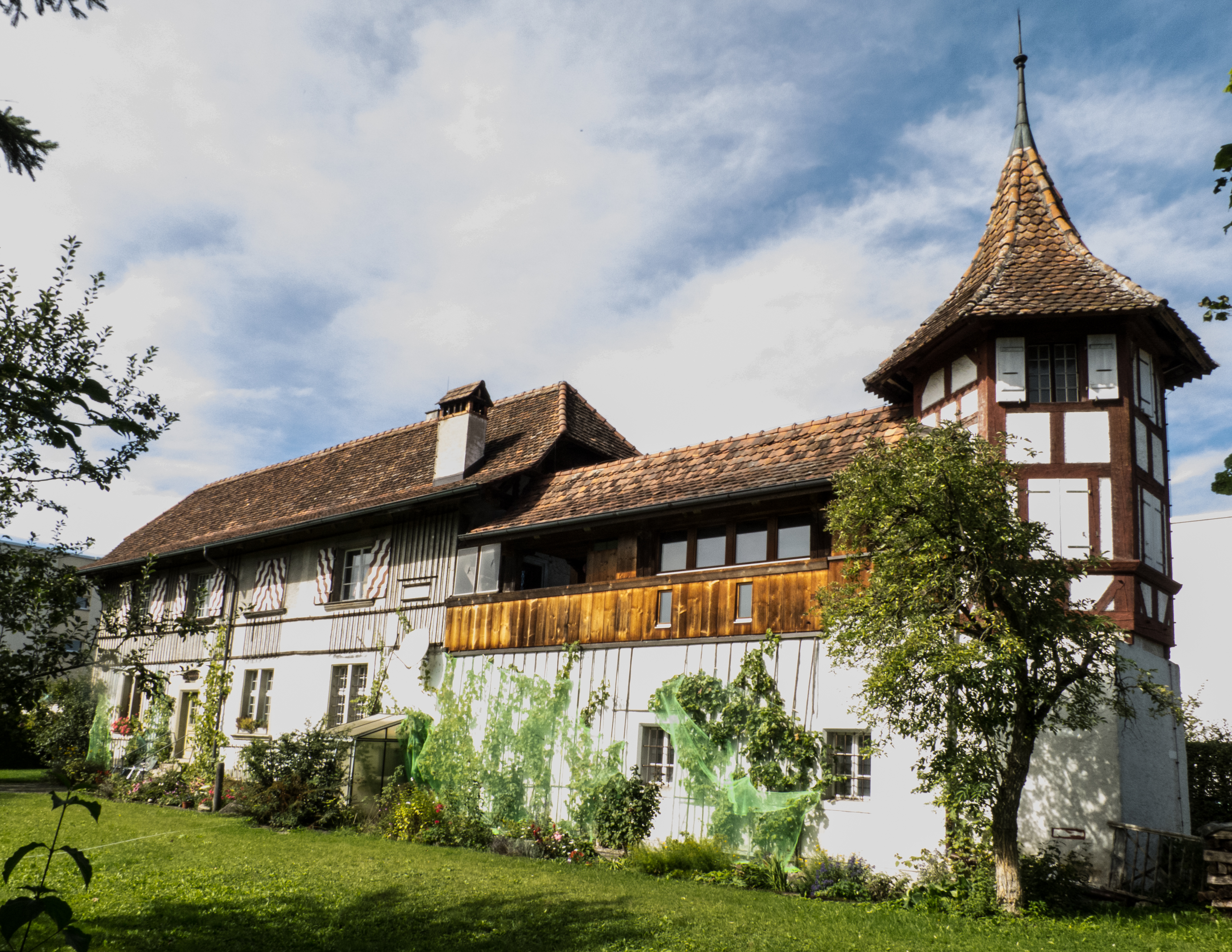
Rüfenacht

Rüfenacht is a locality in the municipality of Worb in the district of Konolfingen in the canton of Bern, Switzerland. It was originally an agricultural village whose farms practiced communal grain cultivation and shared common land and forests. During the 20th century, improved transport connections and population growth led to its growth a suburb of Bern.

== History ==
Rüfenacht was first recorded in 1240 under the name Ruivennacho and was a small agricultural settlement on the Dentenberg between the valleys of the Worble and the Aare. In the Middle Ages several monasteries, including Frienisberg, Engelberg and Interlaken, held property in the village.

The farms of Rüfenacht practiced communal grain cultivation and jointly used common land and forests. Fields were cultivated in large open areas known as Zelgen with set crops and rules for farm work. Forests were also used jointly as sources of timber and firewood and as pasture for livestock.

At an unknown date the lower court of Rüfenacht came under the authority of the city of Bern and was administered together with nearby Vielbringen until 1798 as part of Bern’s municipal court system. Rüfenacht and Vielbringen formed a quarter of the parish of Worb and between 1834 and 1920 constituted a municipal district within the municipality of Worb. Rüfenacht had six farmsteads while Vielbringen had five tenant farms.

Marquard Zehender, a Bernese patrician, acquired land in Rüfenacht in the late 16th century and later created a small landed estate. Around 1650 the Zehender family built a hunting lodge in Rüfenacht as a country residence.

Its location and proximity to Bern led to the expansion of the village during the 20th century. After the Second World War the population increased significantly. Many homes were built between 1960 and 1980, and Rüfenacht became a suburb of Bern.
