= Saules, Switzerland =

Saules
- Municipality
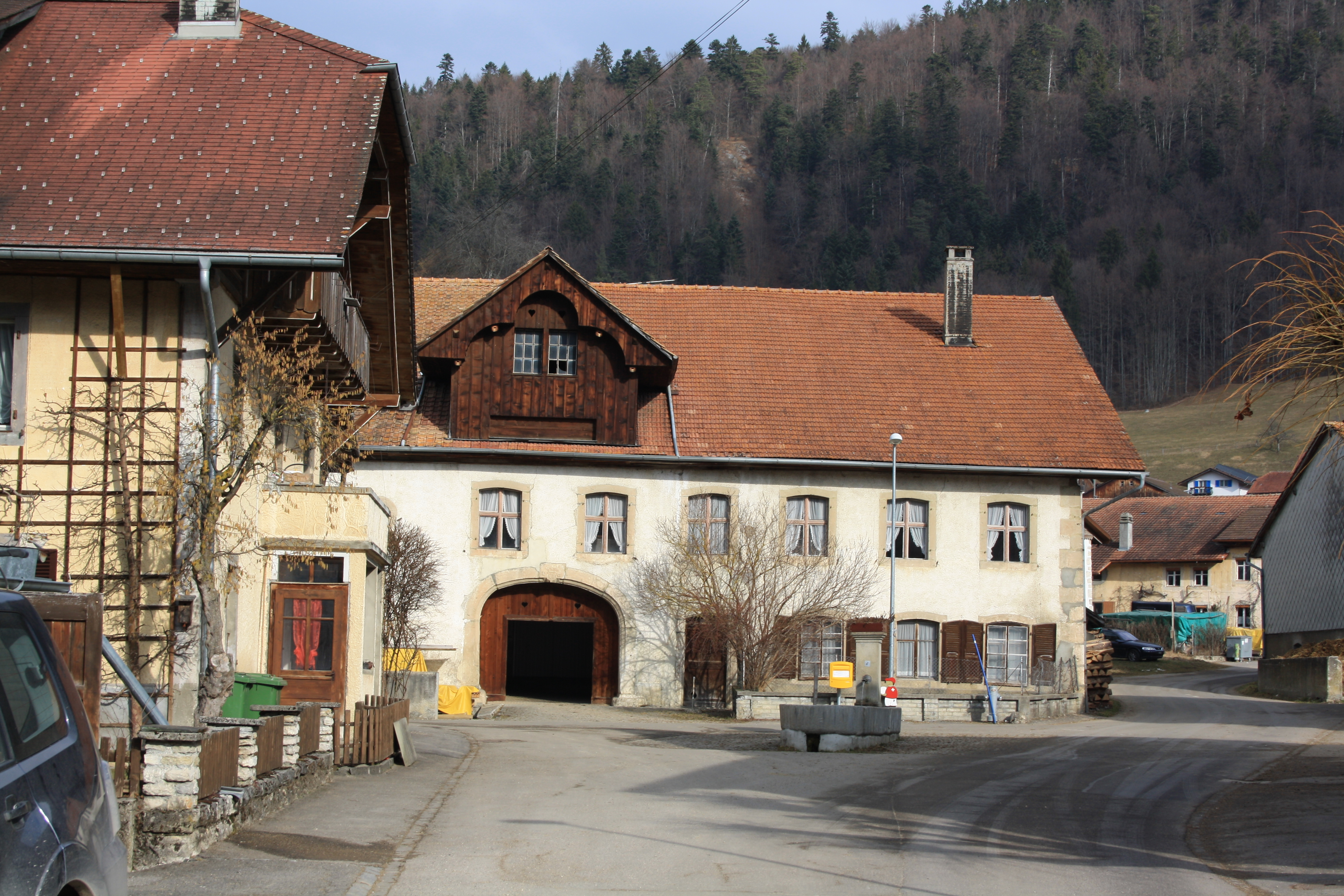
- Saules village

- Flag Coat of arms
- Location of Saules
- Location within Switzerland Location within Canton of Bern
- Coordinates: 47°15′N 07°13′E
- Country: Switzerland
- Canton: Bern
- District: Jura bernois

Government
  - Mayor: Maire

Area
  - Total: 4.25 km^{2} (1.64 sq mi)
- Elevation: 743 m (2,438 ft)

Population (Dec 2011)
  - Total: 153
  - Density: 36.0/km^{2} (93.2/sq mi)
- Time zone: UTC+01:00 (CET)
  - Summer (DST): UTC+02:00 (CEST)
- Postal code: 2732
- SFOS number: 707
- ISO 3166 code: CH-BE
- Surrounded by: Reconvilier, Saicourt, Sornetan, Souboz, Loveresse
- Website: https://saules-be.ch/ SFSO statistics

Saules (French pronunciation: [sol]) is a municipality in the Jura bernois administrative district in the canton of Bern in Switzerland. It is located in the French-speaking Bernese Jura (Jura Bernois).

== Geography ==
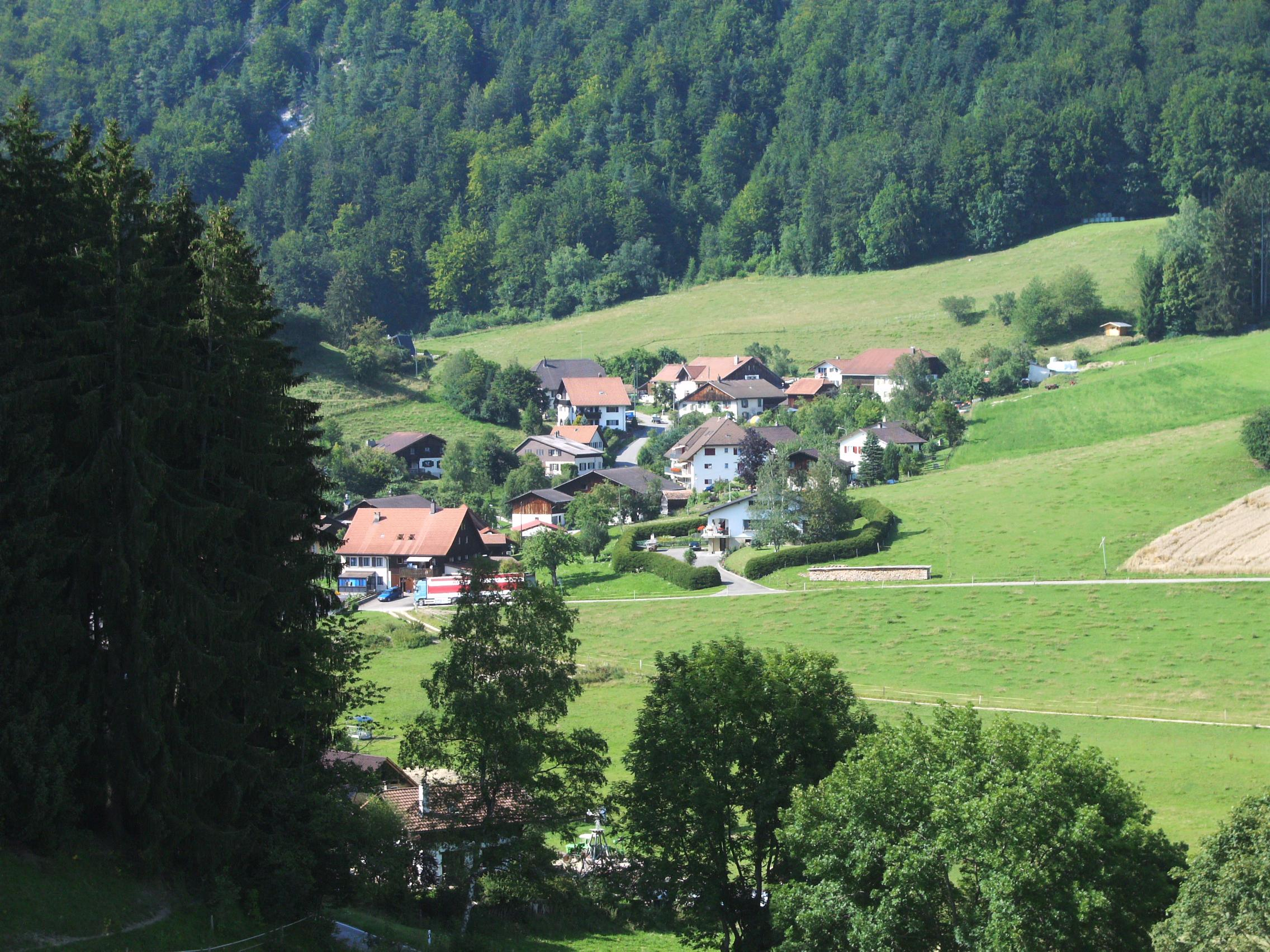
Saules village

Saules has an area of 4.28 km^{2} (1.65 sq mi). As of 2012, a total of 1.84 km^{2} (0.71 mi^{2}) or 43.0% is used for agricultural purposes, while 2.25 km^{2} (0.87 mi^{2}) or 52.6% is forested. Of the rest of the land, 0.16 km^{2} (0.062 mi^{2}) or 3.7% is settled (buildings or roads) and 0.01 km^{2} (2.5 acres) or 0.2% is unproductive land.

During the same year, housing and buildings made up 2.6% and transportation infrastructure made up 1.2%. Out of the forested land, 46.7% of the total land area is heavily forested and 5.8% is covered with orchards or small clusters of trees. Of the agricultural land, 2.6% is used for growing crops and 31.5% is pastures and 8.9% is used for alpine pastures.

The municipality is located in the Trame valley near Reconvilier.

On 31 December 2009 District de Moutier, the municipality's former district, was dissolved. On the following day, 1 January 2010, it joined the newly created Arrondissement administratif Jura bernois.

== Coat of arms ==
The blazon of the municipal coat of arms is Argent three Ears Gules in saltire and palewise.

== Demographics ==
Saules has a population (as of December 2020) of 147. As of 2010, 0.7% of the population are resident foreign nationals. Over the last 10 years (2001-2011) the population has changed at a rate of 2%. Migration accounted for 0.7%, while births and deaths accounted for 1.3%.

Most of the population (as of 2000) speaks French (150 or 91.5%) as their first language, German is the second most common (13 or 7.9%) and Albanian is the third (1 or 0.6%).

As of 2008, the population was 48.7% male and 51.3% female. The population was made up of 73 Swiss men (48.7% of the population). There were 76 Swiss women (50.7%) and 1 (0.7%) non-Swiss women. Of the population in the municipality, 75 or about 45.7% were born in Saules and lived there in 2000. There were 61 or 37.2% who were born in the same canton, while 17 or 10.4% were born somewhere else in Switzerland, and 9 or 5.5% were born outside of Switzerland.

As of 2011, children and teenagers (0–19 years old) make up 26.1% of the population, while adults (20–64 years old) make up 54.2% and seniors (over 64 years old) make up 19.6%.

As of 2000, there were 64 people who were single and never married in the municipality. There were 83 married individuals, 10 widows or widowers and 7 individuals who are divorced.

As of 2010, there were 19 households that consist of only one person and 7 households with five or more people. In 2000, a total of 64 apartments (71.9% of the total) were permanently occupied, while 21 apartments (23.6%) were seasonally occupied and 4 apartments (4.5%) were empty. The vacancy rate for the municipality, in 2012, was 2.17%. In 2011, single family homes made up 68.5% of the total housing in the municipality.

The historical population is given in the following chart:

== Politics ==
In the 2011 federal election the most popular party was the Swiss People's Party (SVP) which received 59.1% of the vote. The next three most popular parties were the Social Democratic Party (SP) (9%), the Green Party (6.3%) and the Evangelical People's Party (EVP) (6.2%). In the federal election, a total of 73 votes were cast, and the voter turnout was 59.8%.

== Economy ==
As of 2011, Saules had an unemployment rate of 1.23%. As of 2008, there were a total of 32 people employed in the municipality. Of these, there were 20 people employed in the primary economic sector and about 7 businesses involved in this sector. 7 people were employed in the secondary sector and there were 3 businesses in this sector. 5 people were employed in the tertiary sector, with 2 businesses in this sector. There were 91 residents of the municipality who were employed in some capacity, of which females made up 35.2% of the workforce.

In 2008 there were a total of 21 full-time equivalent jobs. The number of jobs in the primary sector was 11, all of which were in agriculture. The number of jobs in the secondary sector was 6 of which 5 were in manufacturing and 1 was in construction. The number of jobs in the tertiary sector was 4, with 3 in wholesale or retail sales or the repair of motor vehicles and 1 in the movement and storage of goods.

In 2000, there were 4 workers who commuted into the municipality and 63 workers who commuted away. The municipality is a net exporter of workers, with about 15.8 workers leaving the municipality for every one entering. A total of 28 workers (87.5% of the 32 total workers in the municipality) both lived and worked in Saules.

Of the working population, 9.9% used public transportation to get to work, and 58.2% used a private car.

In 2011 the average local and cantonal tax rate on a married resident, with two children, of Saules making 150,000 CHF was 13%, while an unmarried resident's rate was 19.1%. For comparison, the rate for the entire canton in the same year, was 14.2% and 22.0%, while the nationwide rate was 12.3% and 21.1% respectively. In 2009 there were a total of 59 tax payers in the municipality. Of that total, 21 made over 75,000 CHF per year. The average income of the over 75,000 CHF group in Saules was 91,757 CHF, while the average across all of Switzerland was 130,478 CHF.

== Religion ==
From the 2000 census, 102 or 62.2% belonged to the Swiss Reformed Church, while 10 or 6.1% were Roman Catholic. Of the rest of the population, there were 34 individuals (or about 20.73% of the population) who belonged to another Christian church. There was 1 individual who was Islamic. 7 (or about 4.27% of the population) belonged to no church, are agnostic or atheist, and 10 individuals (or about 6.10% of the population) did not answer the question.

== Education ==
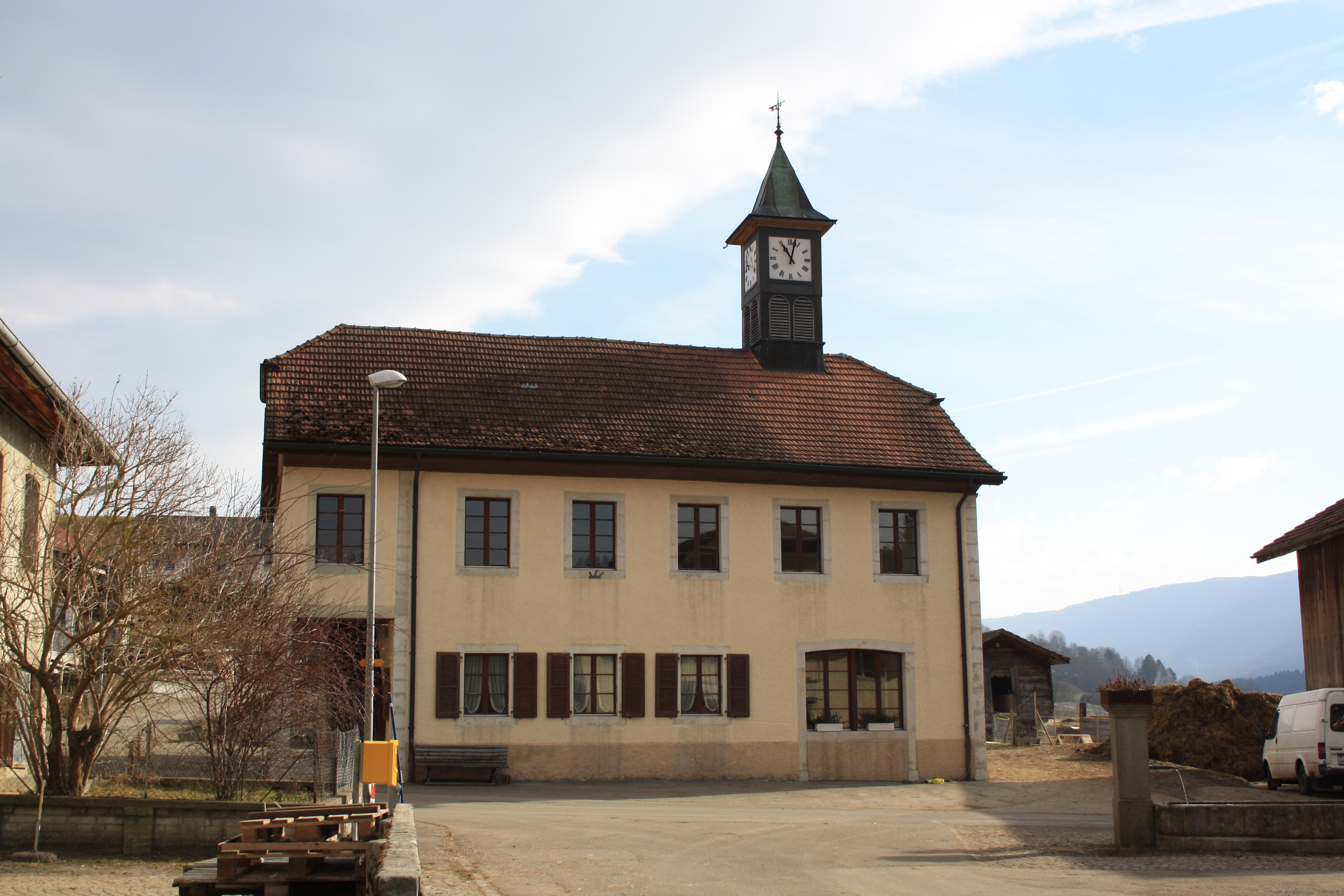
The old schoolhouse of Saules

In Saules about 46.1% of the population have completed non-mandatory upper secondary education, and 10.1% have completed additional higher education (either university or a Fachhochschule). Of the 9 who had completed some form of tertiary schooling listed in the census, 88.9% were Swiss men.

As of 2000, there were no students attending any school in the municipality, but 19 students attended schools outside the municipality.
