= Road Traffic Act (Switzerland) =

Swiss federal law

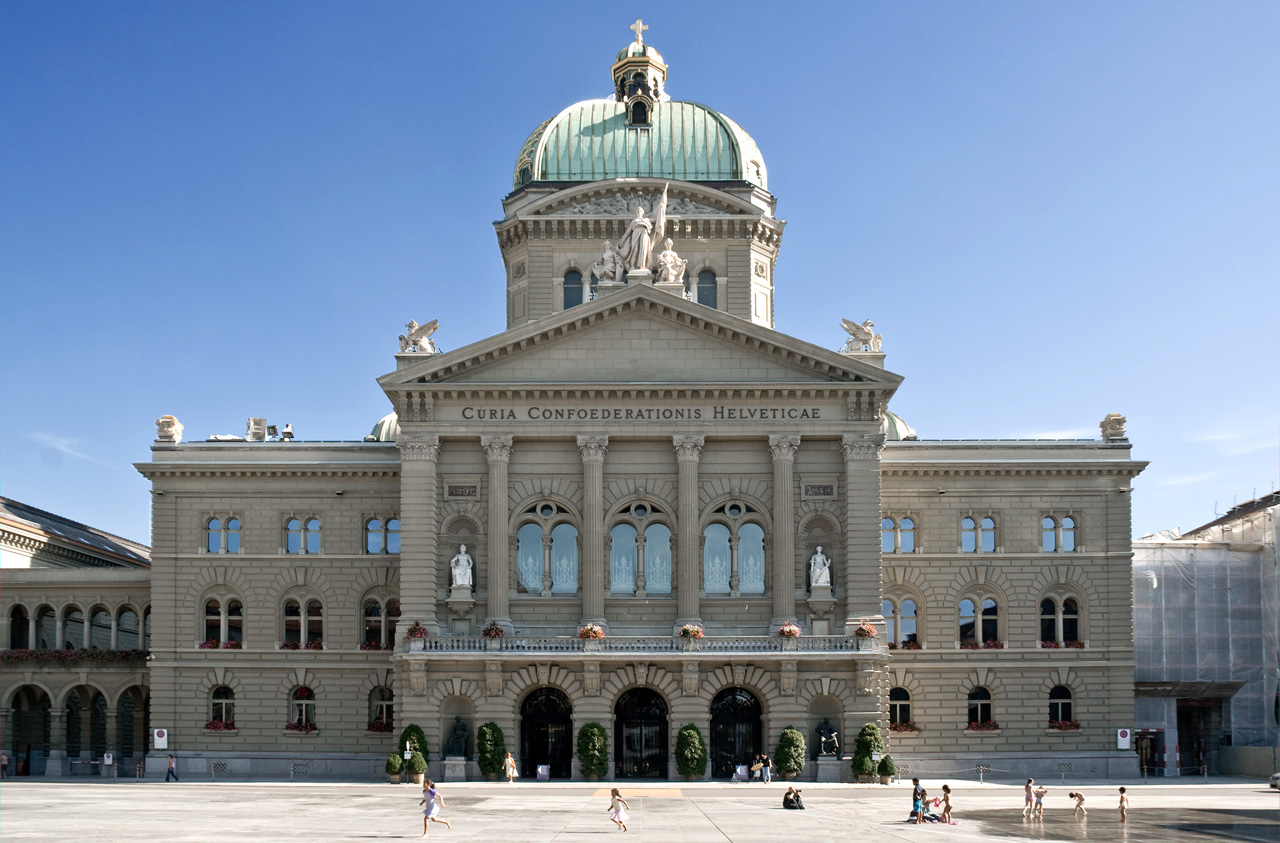

Federal Assembly of Switzerland
- Long title: SR 741.01
- Territorial extent: Switzerland
- Enacted by: Federal Assembly of Switzerland
- Enacted: 19 December 1958
- Commenced: 1 October 1959
- Status: Current legislation

The Road Traffic Act (Note: German: Strassenverkehrsgesetz, SVG; French: Loi fédérale sur la circulation routière, LCR; Italian: Legge federale sulla circolazione stradale, LCStr) is a Swiss federal law that governs traffic on public roads in Switzerland.

It was adopted on 19 December 1958 by the Federal Assembly and came into force on 1 October 1959. Its legal basis comes from art. 82 (Road Transport) of the Federal Constitution.

The law is supplemented by the Ordinance on Road Traffic Regulations. (Note: German: Verkehrsregelnverordnung, VRV; French: Ordonnance sur les règles de la circulation routière, OCR; Italian: Ordinanza sulle norme della circolazione stradale, ONC)

== History ==
The cantons had harmonised motor vehicle and bicycle traffic in the intercantonal agreements of 13 June 1904, 7 April 1914 and 29 December 1921. By 1925, all cantons except Obwalden, Nidwalden, Glarus, Zug and Graubünden had joined the agreement. In 1932, road traffic became a federal matter and the Federal Act on Motor Vehicle and Bicycle Traffic was introduced. It abolished the intercantonal agreements and contradictory cantonal provisions became ineffective.

In 1959, due to the increase in traffic density and mobility, the road traffic law was comprehensively revised, resulting in the Road Traffic Act that is in force today.

== See also ==
- Road signs in Switzerland and Liechtenstein
- Seat belt legislation#Switzerland
- Speed limits in Switzerland
- Traffic code
