= Flora Ruchat-Roncati =

Swiss architect and professor

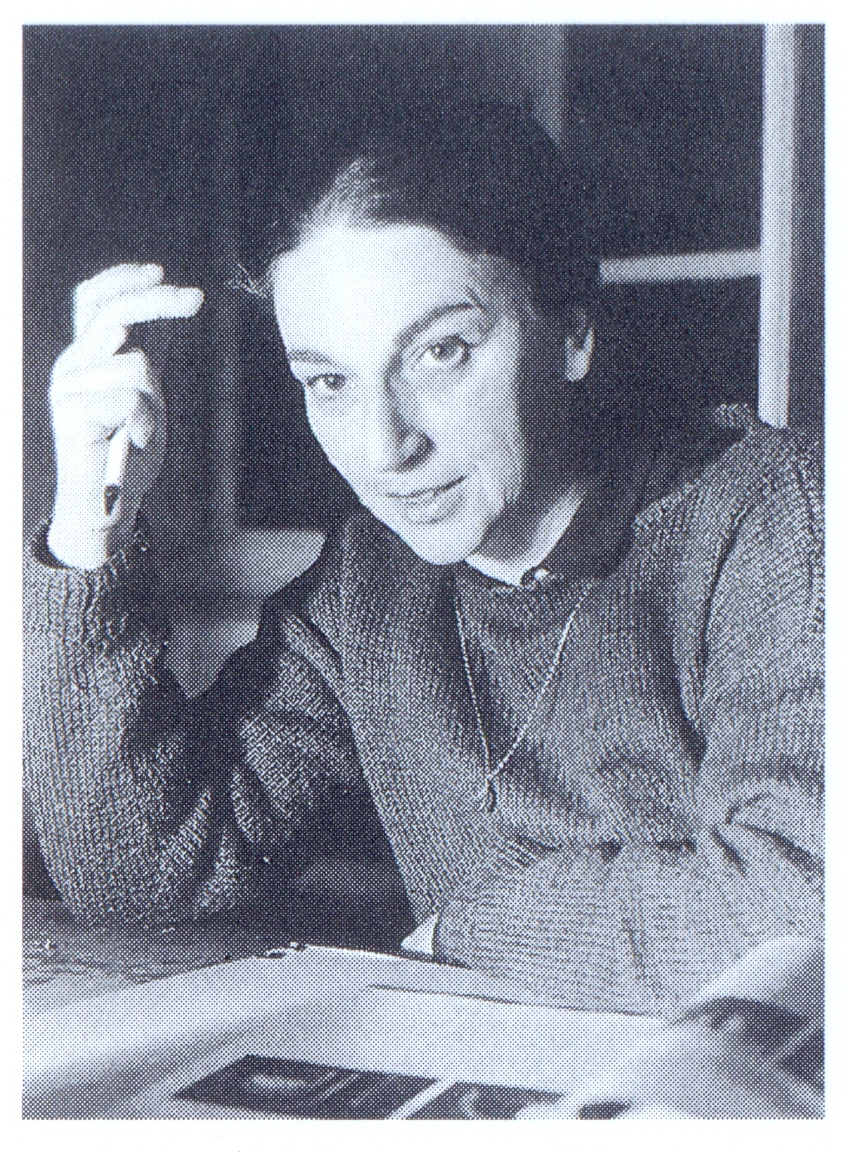
Swiss architect and university person, Flora Ruchat-Roncati

Flora Ruchat-Roncati (1937–2012) was a Swiss architect and professor. She was from Ticino, and became a pioneering figure in the Ticinese School of architecture, which was influential in the mid-1970s, mixing the sensitivity to the traditional with modernism.

She graduated from the ETH Zurich in 1954, and became the first woman professor and chair of Architecture and Design in 1985.

She was co-winner, with her assistant Renato Salvi, of a competition to design the Transjurane highway in 1988. The highway joins the Swiss and French road networks through the Jura mountains and involves many tunnels. Eleven of the tunnels are over a kilometre long.
