= Samuel Zehender =

Swiss soldier and politician (1529–1564)

- Born: 28 October 1529
- Died: December 1564 (aged 35); Bern, Switzerland
- Occupations: Soldier; politician
- Spouse: Anna Löwensprung (m. 1557)
- Relatives: Marquard Zehender (brother)

Samuel Zehender (28 October 1529 – December 1564) was a Bernese soldier and politician. He served in the Papal Swiss Guard and in French mercenary service, then became clerk of the consistory and a member of the Grand Council of Bern. He left a Memorial with notes on his travels and on the proceedings of the Grand Council.

== Biography ==
Samuel Zehender was a member of the Zehender family. He was the son of Hans Ulrich, a bailiff (Landvogt), and Christina Zum Bach, and the brother of Marquard Zehender. In 1557 he married Anna Löwensprung, daughter of Lux, a member of the Small Council.

From 1550 to 1553 Zehender served in the Papal Swiss Guard, and from 1554 to 1555 in French mercenary service. From 1557 he was clerk of the consistory (Chorgerichtsschreiber), and from 1558 a member of the Grand Council of Bern. He left a Memorial with notes on his travels and on the proceedings of the Grand Council. He died of plague in Bern in December 1564. His brother Marquard succeeded him as clerk of the consistory.

== Works ==
- Memorial 1543–1564, manuscript (Burgerbibliothek Bern)
- Excerpts from the Memorial in Archiv des Historischen Vereins des Kantons Bern, 5, 1863, 16–104

== Bibliography ==
- S. Kirchberger, I. Steiger, Bernisches Staatsbuch, 6, 814 (manuscript, undated, Burgerbibliothek Bern)
- M. Sulser, Der Stadtschreiber Peter Cyro und die bernische Kanzlei zur Zeit der Reformation, 1922, 148–154
- B. von Rodt, Genealogien burgerlicher Geschlechter der Stadt Bern, 6, 397 (manuscript, 1950, Burgerbibliothek Bern)
