= Motorways of Switzerland =

Swiss motorways sign (max 120 km/h)

Swiss expressways sign (max 100 km/h)

Switzerland has a two-class highway system: motorways with separated roads for oncoming traffic and a standard maximal speed limit of 120 kilometres per hour (75 mph), and expressways often with oncoming traffic and a standard maximal speed limit of 100 kilometres per hour (62 mph).

Autobahnen in German, autoroutes in French, autostrade in Italian, autostradas in Romansch are the local names of the national motorways of Switzerland. Two of the most important freeways are the A1, running from St. Margrethen in northeastern Switzerland's canton of St. Gallen through to Geneva in southwestern Switzerland, and the A2, running from Basel in northwestern Switzerland to Chiasso in southern Switzerland's canton of Ticino, on the border with Italy.

Autostrassen in German, semi-autoroutes in French, semiautostrade in Italian, autovias in Romansch are the local names of the national expressways.

Motorways and expressways are restricted to motorized vehicles that can attain a speed of at least 80 km/h (50 mph) (VRV/ORC/ONC Art. 35 1).

For the usage of any motorways or expressways the purchase of a motorway sticker ("vignette") to be put on the car's windshield is mandatory.

== Network map ==
Interactive map of Motorways of Switzerland

== History ==
A short stretch of autobahn around the Lucerne area in 1955 created Switzerland's first autobahn. For Expo 1964, an autoroute was built between Lausanne and Geneva. The Bern-Lenzburg autobahn was inaugurated in 1967.

== Current density ==
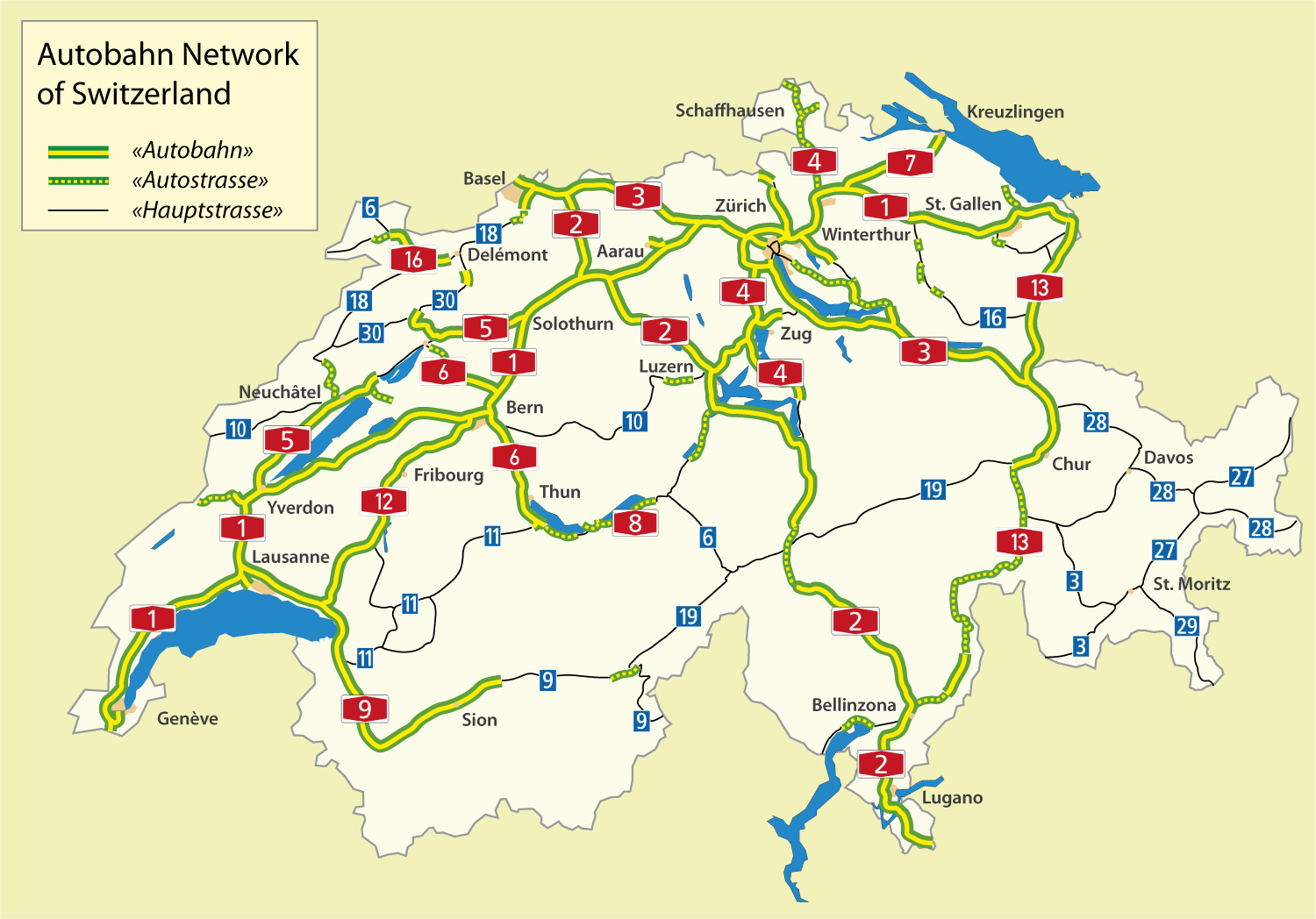
Map of the Swiss autobahn network

The Swiss autobahn/autoroute network has a total length (as of April 2012) of 1,763.6 kilometres (1,095.9 miles), of the planned 1,893.5 kilometres (1,176.6 miles), and has, by an area of 41,290 km^{2}, also one of the highest motorway densities in the world with many tunnels. There are 200 tunnels with a total length of 220 kilometres (140 miles).

The Swiss autobahn/autoroute network has not yet been completed; priority has been given to the most important routes, especially the north-south and the west-east axis.

Swiss autobahns/autoroutes very often have an emergency lane except in tunnels. Some newly built autobahn sections, like the lone section crossing the Jura Mountains region in the north-western part of Switzerland, have only emergency bays.

== Toll requirements ==
The Swiss autobahn/autoroute system requires the purchase of a vignette (toll sticker) — which costs 40 Swiss francs — for one calendar year in order to use its roadways, for both passenger cars and trucks. The Swiss vignette is offered only as an annual toll sticker. Trucks also have to pay a toll based on the tonnage and the distance.

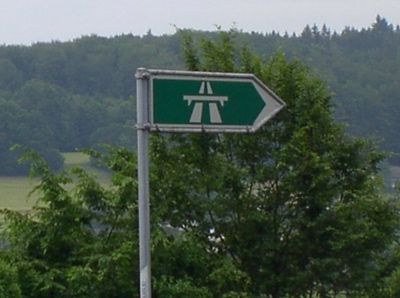
A direction sign to a nearby motorway

The cantons abandoned the right to raise road and bridge tolls to the Confederation, and the only way of funding the road system is partly through the vignette, the motor tax for every registered vehicle and mainly through the federal taxes levied on each liter of gasoline, diesel fuel, etc.

Tolls for the use of particular roads, tunnels or bridges cannot be raised according to the Swiss constitution and so even the use of cost-intensive pieces of infrastructure such as the Gotthard Road Tunnel is financed by the entire system. The only exceptions are the Munt la Schera and Great St Bernard tunnels and the train shuttles carrying road vehicles.

== List of Autobahnen/Autoroutes/Autostrade ==
Note: Portions in italics indicate missing parts or routes under construction or projection.

- A1 St. Margrethen (Austrian border) - St. Gallen - Winterthur - Zürich (North Ring) - Aarau - Olten - Bern - Murten - Avenches - Payerne - Estavayer-le-Lac - Yverdon-les-Bains - Lausanne - Nyon - Geneva - Bardonnex (French border)
- A2 Basel (German border) - Olten - Luzern - Altdorf UR - Gotthard - Bellinzona - Lugano - Chiasso (Italian border)
- A3 Basel (French border) - Augst - Brugg - Zürich (West Ring) - Thalwil - Pfäffikon - Ziegelbrücke - Sargans
- A4 Thayngen / Bargen (German border) - Schaffhausen - Winterthur - Zürich (North & West Ring) - Cham - Brunnen - Altdorf
- A5 Luterbach - Solothurn - Biel/Bienne - (Nidau) - La Neuveville - Neuchâtel - Yverdon
- A6 Lyss - Bern-Schönbühl - Thun - Spiez
- A7 Kreuzlingen (German border) - Weinfelden - Frauenfeld - Winterthur
- A8 Hergiswil - Sarnen - (Sachseln - Brünig Pass - Brienzwiler) - Interlaken - Spiez
- A9 Vallorbe (French border) - Chavornay / Villars-Sainte-Croix - Vevey - Sion - Sierre - (Visp) - Brig
- A10 Muri bei Bern - Rüfenacht
- A12 Bern - Fribourg - Bulle - Vevey
- A13 St. Margrethen (Austrian border) - Buchs SG - Sargans - Landquart - Chur - Thusis - San Bernardino - Bellinzona
- A14 Luzern - Cham - Zug - Baar
- A15 Brüttisellen - Uster - (Wetzikon) - Hinwil - Reichenburg ("Zürcher Oberlandautobahn")
- A16 Boncourt (French border) - Porrentruy - Delémont - Moutier - Biel/Bienne ("Transjurane")
- A17 Näfels - Niederurnen
- A18 Basel - Reinach BL
- A20 Le Locle - La Chaux-de-Fonds - Neuchâtel - Ins
- A21 Bypass Martigny
- A22 Pratteln - Sissach
- A23 Müllheim - Eschikofen - (Weinfelden - Amriswil) - Arbon - Rorschach ("Bodensee-Thurtalstrasse")
- A24 Mendrisio - Stabio
- A25 Herisau - Gossau SG
- A50 Rheinsfelden ZH - Glattfelden (bypass Glattfelden)
- A51 Bülach - Zürich Airport - Zürich-North ("Flughafenautobahn")
- A52 Zumikon - Hinwil ("Forchstrasse")

== Military significance ==
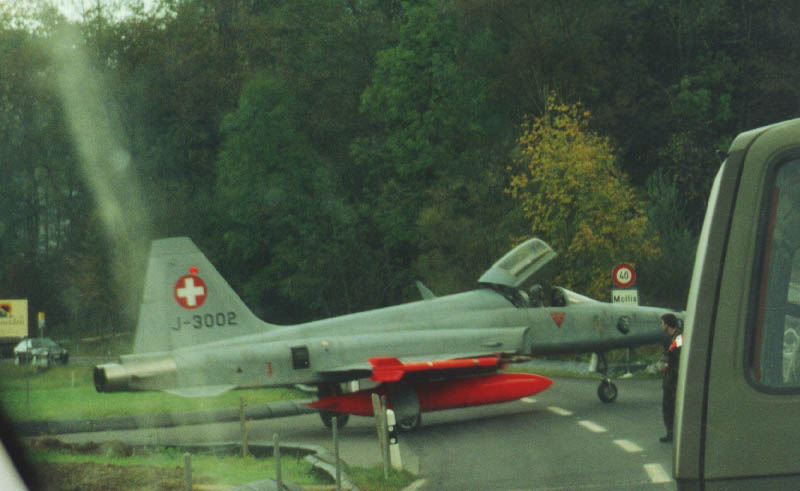
A Swiss Air Force F-5E Tiger II crossing a road between the runway and a hardened aircraft shelter in Mollis airfield in 1999.

When planning the motorway network, the demands of the Air Force were taken into consideration by planning the motorways so they could be used as alternate runways (highway strips). Various stretches of motorway were constructed with straight sections of about 2 km length. The guardrails were replaced by steel cables and could be removed if necessary within a few hours. After cleaning the roadways, painting the runway markings, and setting up wireless connections, such a motorway section could be used as a runway.

The last example of a "runway" was Highway A1 - section Murten - be Payerne, opened in the 1990s, parallel to the runway of the airbase in Payerne.

The use of aircraft was occasionally tested by the WK-units (FLPL Dept.). The section in Oensingen was used on 16 September 1970 from 12-15 o'clock for a military exercise, which was characteristic of the Cold War. The level of secrecy was accordingly high. All unnecessary notices were therefore to be avoided, but many spectators were present, and the media reported it.

The aviators and airport Regiment 3 with the DH-112 Venom performed exercises, which placed great demands on the infrastructure and the skill of the pilots. The exercise was successful, which served as a lesson for other landing and takeoff exercises in other sections of the Swiss motorway network, the last time in 1991 Tessin.

| Date | Exercise name | Place | Motorway | Truppe | Remark |
|---|---|---|---|---|---|
| 16 September 1970 | «U STRADA» | Oensingen | N1 | Flpl Abt 9 | Alpnach Air Base : 12 de Havilland Venom |
| 26 September 1974 | «U STRADA» | Münsingen | N6 | Flpl Abt 12 & 13 | Flugplatz Interlaken : de Havilland Venom, Meiringen air base : Hawker Hunter |
| 28 September 1977 | «U NOLA» | Flums | N13 | Flpl Abt 9 | Alpnach Air Base : Hawker Hunter |
| 1 June 1978 | «U NOSTA» | Alpnach | N8 | Flpl Abt 9 | Alpnach Air Base : Hawker Hunter |
| 6 May 1980 | «U ABEX» | Aigle-Bex | N9 | Flpl Rgt 1 | Raron, Turtmann and Sion Airport : 36 Hawker Hunter |
| 24 March 1982 | «U TAUTO» | Münsingen | N6 | Flpl Rgt 2 | Meiringen air base: Hawker Hunter F-5 Tiger Interlaken Hawker Hunter |
| 15 October 1985 | «U TAUTO» | Flums | N13 | Flpl Abt 8 | Ambri Airport : Hawker Hunter, Alpnach : F-5 Tiger, Mollis : Hawker Hunter |
| 29 September 1988 | «U TUTTI» | Alpnach | N8 | Flpl Abt 9 | Alpnach Air Base : F-5 Tiger |
| 16 November 1988 | «U NOSTASIO» | Sion | N9 | Flpl Abt 4 | Sion Airport : start of F-5 Tiger |
| 14 November 1991 | «U STRADA» | Lodrino | N2 | Flpl Abt 8 | Ambri Airport : Hawker Hunter, Alpnach Air Base : F-5 Tiger II, Mollis : Hawker Hunter |
| 5 June 2024 | «ALPHA UNO» | Payerne | N1 | Flst 17 | Payerne Air Base: F/A-18 |

Never tested following motorway sections:

- Stans A2, Short for emergency starting of Dassault Mirage III with JATO rockets.

With the end of the Cold War and the restructuring of the Swiss Army objects are continuously released from the inventory of military infrastructure, including various national roads buildings. With the reform of the army in 1995, the concept of highway-airfields was abandoned until recently.

Another discontinued double use of motorways is the Sonnenberg Tunnel the A2 near Lucerne. Originally designed as the largest civilian shelter of Switzerland and one of the largest in the world and subject to annual functionality tests until 2005, due to increasing maintenance costs its use as a civil defense shelter has been greatly reduced. Previously it accommodated 17,000 people, today it has a capacity of 2,000.

The Gotthard road tunnel was also dismissed from the inventory of strategic buildings. After a devastating fire accident in 2001 and the subsequent renovation of the blocked section, explosives stored in a side chamber in the interior of the tunnel were removed during the reconstruction.

An exercise of landings and take-offs called "Alpha Uno" on the Payerne A1 section of the motorway was performed on 5 June 2024.

== See also ==
- Autostrasse
- Road signs in Switzerland
- List of controlled-access highway systems
- Evolution of motorway construction in European nations
