= Loveresse =

- Municipality
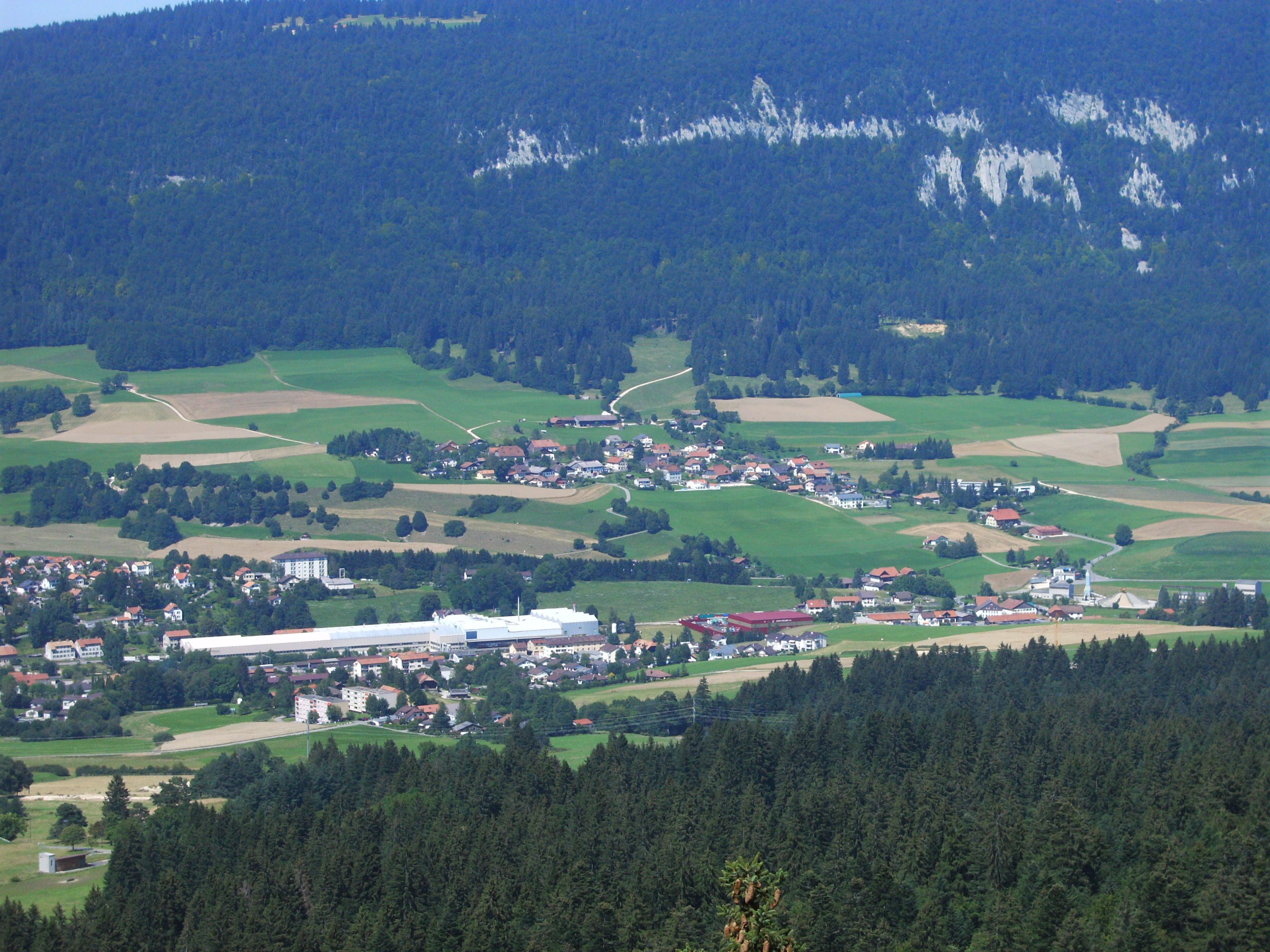
- Loveresse village (center) and surrounding municipalities

- Flag Coat of arms
- Location of Loveresse
- Location within Switzerland Location within Canton of Bern
- Coordinates: 47°15′N 7°14′E
- Country: Switzerland
- Canton: Bern
- District: Jura bernois

Government
  - Mayor: Maire; Martin Schlappach

Area
  - Total: 4.64 km^{2} (1.79 sq mi)
- Elevation: 761 m (2,497 ft)

Population (Dec 2011)
  - Total: 315
  - Density: 67.9/km^{2} (176/sq mi)
- Time zone: UTC+01:00 (CET)
  - Summer (DST): UTC+02:00 (CEST)
- Postal code: 2732
- SFOS number: 696
- ISO 3166 code: CH-BE
- Surrounded by: Reconvilier, Saules, Souboz, Pontenet, Malleray
- Website: www.loveresse.ch

Loveresse is a municipality in the Jura bernois administrative district in the canton of Bern in Switzerland. It is located in the French-speaking Bernese Jura (Jura Bernois).

== History ==
Loveresse is first mentioned in 1148 as de Loveresce though this document is probably a late 12th-century forgery. In 1225 it was mentioned as Loverasse.

In the 12th century both Bellelay Abbey and the college of canons of Moutier-Grandval Abbey owned lands or rights in Loveresse. During the second half of the 13th century, Bellelay Abbey expanded their holdings in the village and became the main landowner there. In 1404 the Prince-Bishop of Basel granted extensive rights to Loveresse in a bid to attract settlers. The village church was part of the parish of Tavannes-Chaindon. When the parish converted to the new faith of the Protestant Reformation, Loveresse also converted. It remained part of the parish until 1928 when it joined the Reconvilier parish.

By the beginning of the Early Modern era, the village was owned by the provost of Moutier-Grandval. After the 1797 French victory and the Treaty of Campo Formio, Loveresse became part of the French Département of Mont-Terrible. Three years later, in 1800 it became part of the Département of Haut-Rhin. After Napoleon's defeat and the Congress of Vienna, Loveresse was assigned to the Canton of Bern in 1815.

In the late 19th century, several watch manufactures established shops in Loveresse. However, none of them survived the worldwide Great Depression. In 1906 the Canton of Bern purchased the hospice in the Vallée de Tavannes. It was converted into a girls' boarding school. In 1975 the building was converted into a clinic for the Bellelay region, and it was used in that capacity until 1987. After 1987 it was used as an agricultural training school, the Centre de formation et de vulgarisation agricole du Bernese Jura.

== Geography ==
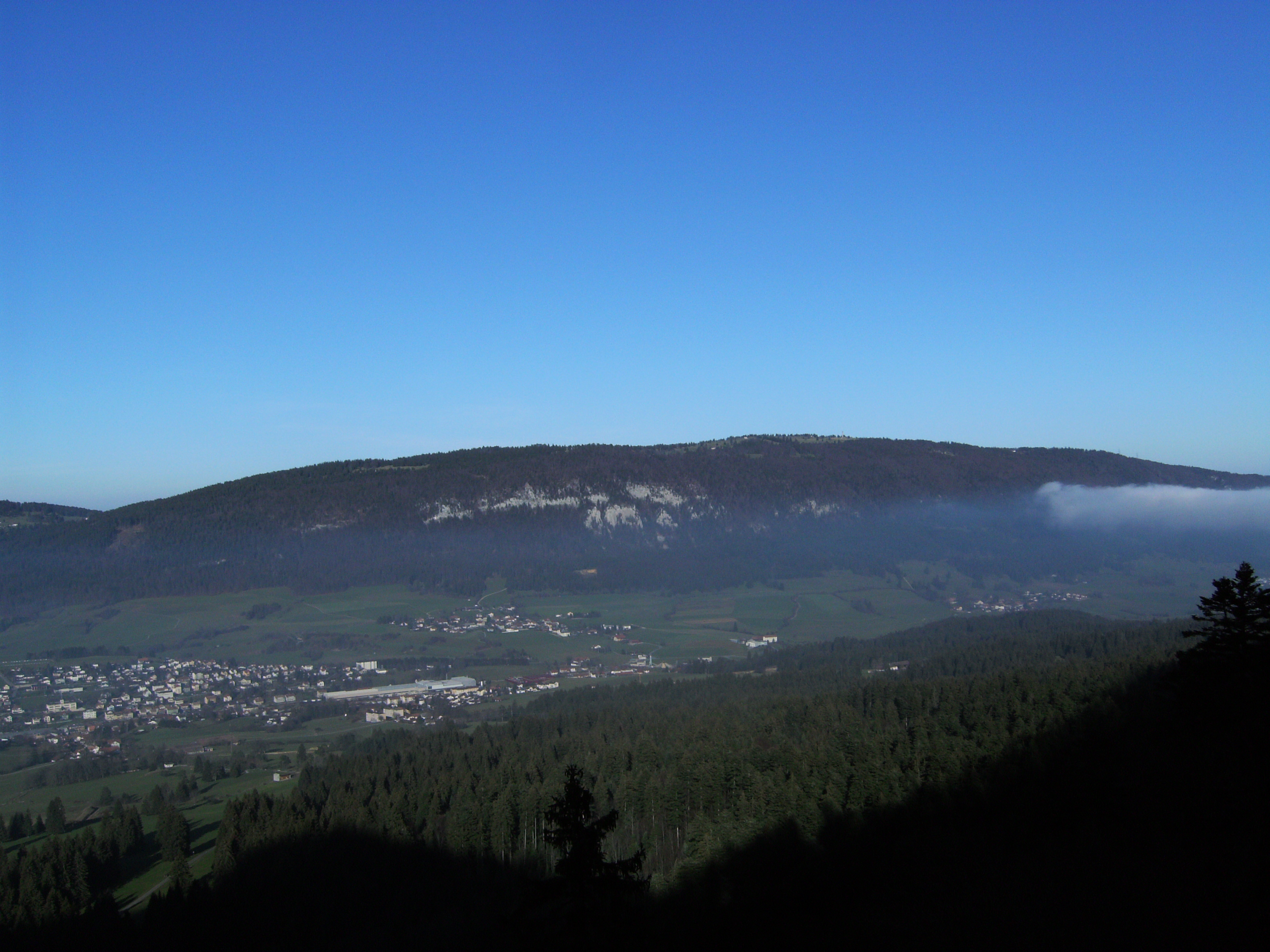
Moron mountain and the surrounding villages, including Loveresse in the center under the cliff face.

Loveresse has an area of 4.69 km^{2} (1.81 sq mi). As of 2012, a total of 2.2 km^{2} (0.85 mi^{2}) or 46.6% is used for agricultural purposes, while 2.27 km^{2} (0.88 mi^{2}) or 48.1% is forested. Of the rest of the land, 0.26 km^{2} (0.10 mi^{2}) or 5.5% is settled (buildings or roads), 0.01 km^{2} (2.5 acres) or 0.2% is either rivers or lakes and 0.04 km^{2} (9.9 acres) or 0.8% is unproductive land.

During the same year, housing and buildings made up 2.3% and transportation infrastructure made up 2.1%. Out of the forested land, 41.5% of the total land area is heavily forested and 6.6% is covered with orchards or small clusters of trees. Of the agricultural land, 13.6% is used for growing crops and 11.7% is pastures and 21.2% is used for alpine pastures. All the water in the municipality is flowing water.

The municipality is located on the southern slope of Moron Hill in the Vallée de Tavannes (Tavannes Valley).

On 31 December 2009 District de Moutier, the municipality's former district, was dissolved. On the following day, 1 January 2010, it joined the newly created Arrondissement administratif Jura bernois.

== Coat of arms ==
The blazon of the municipal coat of arms is Gules on a Bar Argent a Rose of the first barbed and seeded proper.

== Demographics ==
Loveresse has a population (as of December 2020) of 349. As of 2010, 6.3% of the population are resident foreign nationals. Over the last 10 years (2001-2011) the population has changed at a rate of -0.3%. Migration accounted for -0.9%, while births and deaths accounted for 0%.

Most of the population (as of 2000) speaks French (287 or 86.2%) as their first language, German is the second most common (43 or 12.9%) and Italian is the third (1 or 0.3%).

As of 2008, the population was 48.4% male and 51.6% female. The population was made up of 140 Swiss men (44.3% of the population) and 13 (4.1%) non-Swiss men. There were 156 Swiss women (49.4%) and 7 (2.2%) non-Swiss women. Of the population in the municipality, 95 or about 28.5% were born in Loveresse and lived there in 2000. There were 149 or 44.7% who were born in the same canton, while 57 or 17.1% were born somewhere else in Switzerland, and 24 or 7.2% were born outside of Switzerland.

As of 2011, children and teenagers (0–19 years old) make up 20.6% of the population, while adults (20–64 years old) make up 59.7% and seniors (over 64 years old) make up 19.7%.

As of 2000, there were 133 people who were single and never married in the municipality. There were 172 married individuals, 19 widows or widowers and 9 individuals who are divorced.

As of 2010, there were 30 households that consist of only one person and 6 households with five or more people. In 2000, a total of 115 apartments (85.2% of the total) were permanently occupied, while 7 apartments (5.2%) were seasonally occupied and 13 apartments (9.6%) were empty. In 2011, single family homes made up 64.9% of the total housing in the municipality.

The historical population is given in the following chart:

== Politics ==
In the 2011 federal election the most popular party was the Swiss People's Party (SVP) which received 35% of the vote. The next three most popular parties were the Social Democratic Party (SP) (22.8%), the Federal Democratic Union of Switzerland (EDU) (10.6%) and another local party (6.1%). In the federal election, a total of 113 votes were cast, and the voter turnout was 45.7%.

== Economy ==
As of 2011, Loveresse had an unemployment rate of 0.83%. As of 2008, there were a total of 160 people employed in the municipality. Of these, there were 23 people employed in the primary economic sector and about 6 businesses involved in this sector. 51 people were employed in the secondary sector and there were 3 businesses in this sector. 86 people were employed in the tertiary sector, with 15 businesses in this sector. There were 163 residents of the municipality who were employed in some capacity, of which females made up 44.2% of the workforce.

In 2008 there were a total of 124 full-time equivalent jobs. The number of jobs in the primary sector was 15, all of which were in agriculture. The number of jobs in the secondary sector was 50 of which 48 or (96.0%) were in manufacturing The number of jobs in the tertiary sector was 59. In the tertiary sector; 12 or 20.3% were in wholesale or retail sales or the repair of motor vehicles, 2 or 3.4% were in the movement and storage of goods, 11 or 18.6% were in a hotel or restaurant, 2 or 3.4% were in the information industry, 8 or 13.6% were technical professionals or scientists, 2 or 3.4% were in education and 18 or 30.5% were in health care.

In 2000, there were 84 workers who commuted into the municipality and 112 workers who commuted away. The municipality is a net exporter of workers, with about 1.3 workers leaving the municipality for every one entering. A total of 51 workers (37.8% of the 135 total workers in the municipality) both lived and worked in Loveresse. Of the working population, 5.5% used public transportation to get to work, and 68.7% used a private car.

In 2011 the average local and cantonal tax rate on a married resident, with two children, of Loveresse making 150,000 CHF was 13.2%, while an unmarried resident's rate was 19.4%. For comparison, the rate for the entire canton in the same year, was 14.2% and 22.0%, while the nationwide rate was 12.3% and 21.1% respectively. In 2009 there were a total of 127 tax payers in the municipality. Of that total, 44 made over 75,000 CHF per year. There was one person who made between 15,000 and 20,000 per year. The greatest number of workers, 46, made between 50 and 75 thousand CHF per year. The average income of the over 75,000 CHF group in Loveresse was 100,718 CHF, while the average across all of Switzerland was 130,478 CHF. In 2011 a total of 1.6% of the population received direct financial assistance from the government.

== Religion ==
From the 2000 census, 170 or 51.1% belonged to the Swiss Reformed Church, while 57 or 17.1% were Roman Catholic. Of the rest of the population, there were 56 individuals (or about 16.82% of the population) who belonged to another Christian church. 33 (or about 9.91% of the population) belonged to no church, are agnostic or atheist, and 17 individuals (or about 5.11% of the population) did not answer the question.

== Education ==
In Loveresse about 62.5% of the population have completed non-mandatory upper secondary education, and 13.6% have completed additional higher education (either university or a Fachhochschule). Of the 27 who had completed some form of tertiary schooling listed in the census, 59.3% were Swiss men, 22.2% were Swiss women.

The Canton of Bern school system provides one year of non-obligatory Kindergarten, followed by six years of Primary school. This is followed by three years of obligatory lower Secondary school where the students are separated according to ability and aptitude. Following the lower Secondary students may attend additional schooling or they may enter an apprenticeship.

During the 2011–12 school year, there were a total of 21 students attending classes in Loveresse. There were no kindergarten classes and one primary class with 21 students. Of the primary students, 4.8% have a different mother language than the classroom language.

As of 2000, there were a total of 36 students attending any school in the municipality. Of those, 35 both lived and attended school in the municipality, while one student came from another municipality. During the same year, 19 residents attended schools outside the municipality.
