= A5 motorway (Switzerland) =

Road

A5

Location
- Country: Switzerland

Highway system
- Transport in Switzerland; Motorways

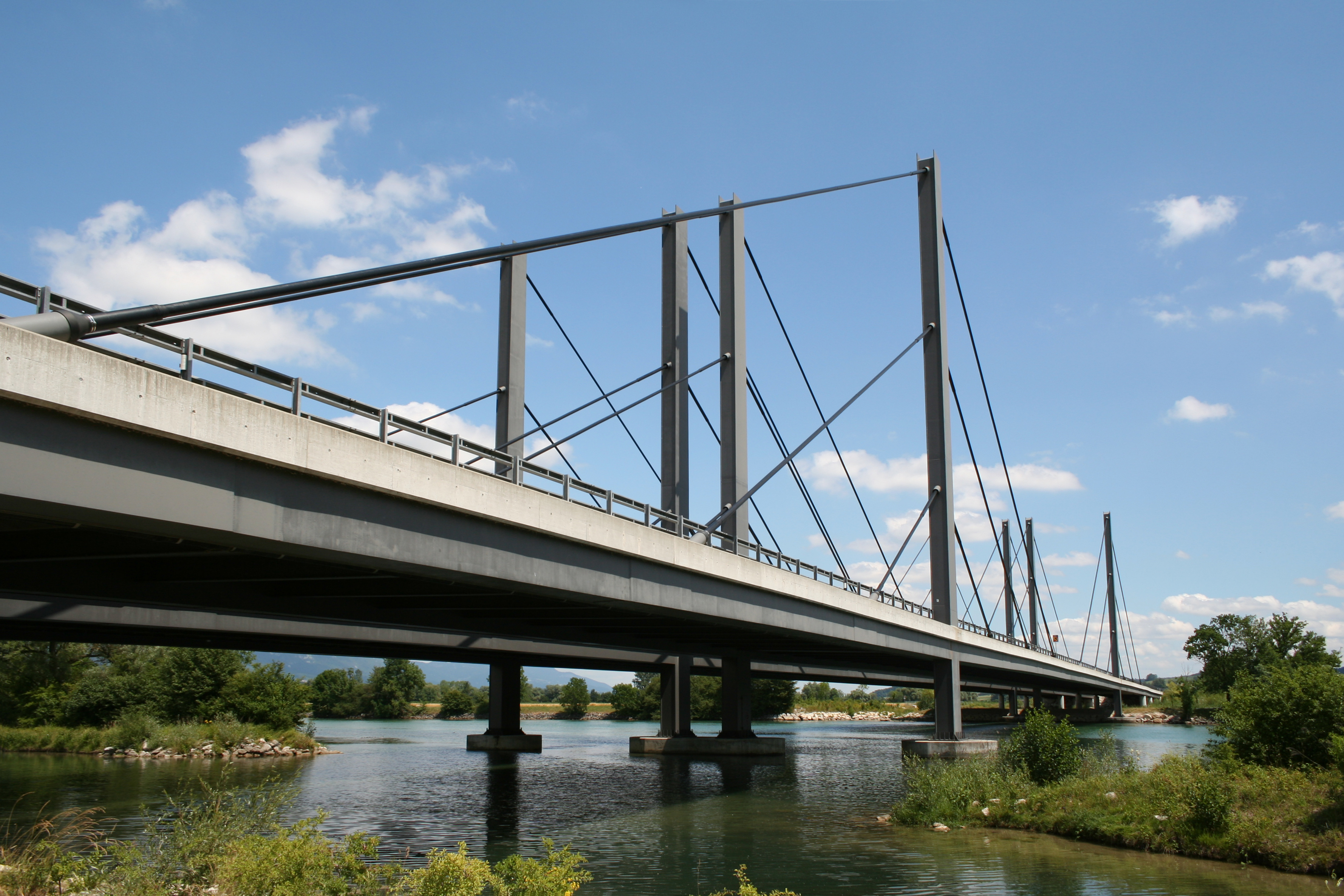
Bridge of the highway A5 over the Aare river. Municipalities Grenchen and Arch, Switzerland

The A5 is a Swiss autobahn (motorway) connecting Luterbach, Solothurn, Biel/Bienne, La Neuveville, Neuchâtel, and Yverdon. It branches off to the northeast before Solothurn from the Swiss motorway A1, passes through Biel and Neuchâtel to Yverdon-les-Bains in the southwest, where it rejoins the A1.

== Road ==
The A5 Swiss motorway is approximately 100 km long. It leads along the southeastern side of the Jura Mountains in an arc from southwest to northeast.
