= Road signs in Switzerland and Liechtenstein =

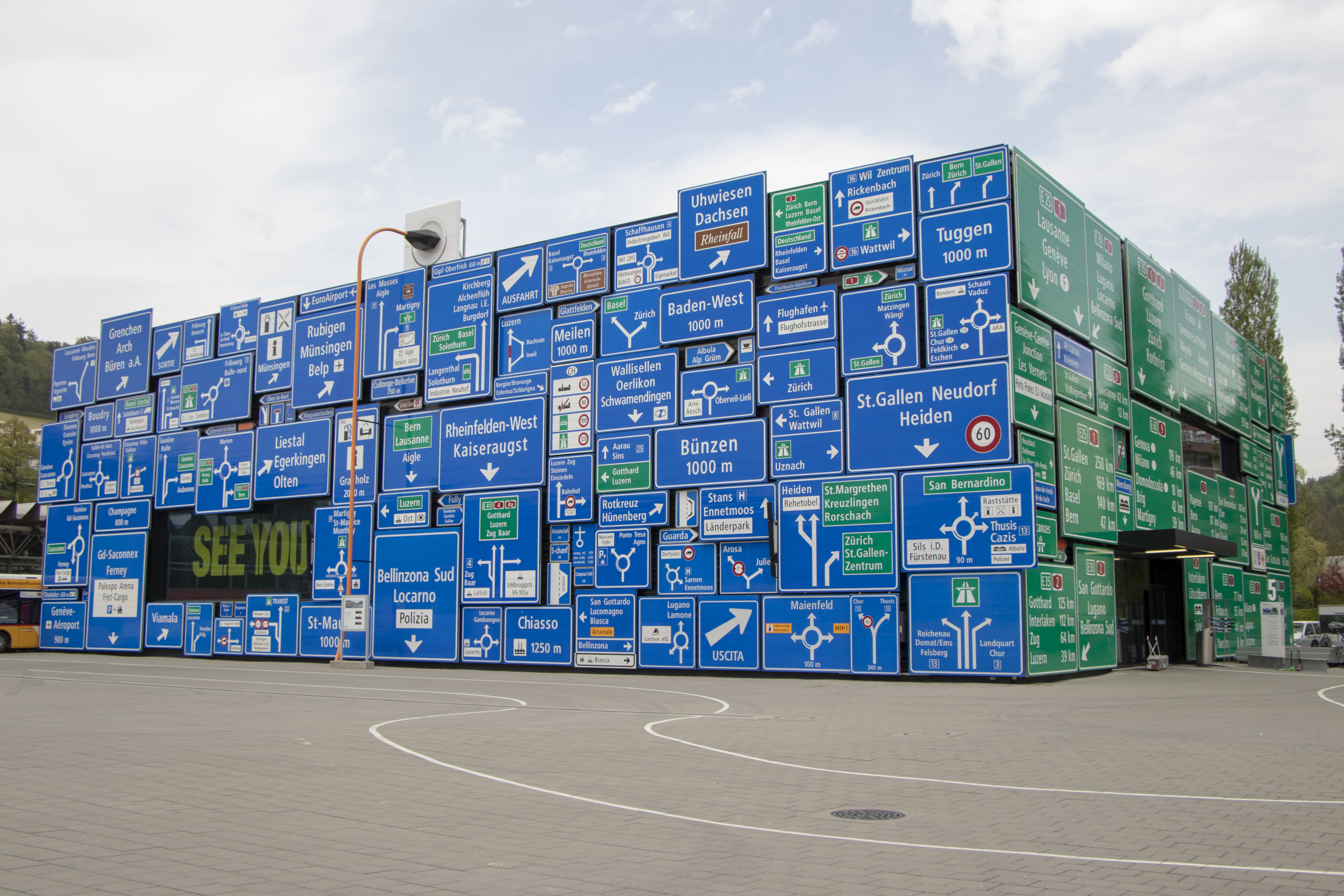
Numerous Swiss direction signs form the façade of the Road Transport Hall at the Swiss Transport Museum

Road signs in Switzerland and Liechtenstein largely conform to the 1968 Vienna Convention on Road Signs and Signals. Switzerland signed the Vienna Convention on Road Signs and Signals on November 8, 1968 and ratified it on December 11, 1991. On March 2, 2020 Liechtenstein acceded to the Convention.

Although Switzerland is not a member of the European Union, the road signs largely follow the general European conventions concerning the use of shape and color to indicate their function. However, this is only a general pattern, as there are several exceptions.

== Regulation ==
In Switzerland, each canton is responsible for the management and placement of its road signs and complementary panels and they use the whichever of the four official languages of Switzerland is appropriate. In Liechtenstein, German is used.

Distances and other measurements are displayed in metric units in all cases.

In 2003, the ASTRA-Frutiger font replaced the SNV font, which is still used in Liechtenstein.

== Legal basis ==
The Swiss road signs are defined in the Road Signs Act, which is based on several laws and ordinances. Liechtenstein largely follows the legislation of Switzerland. The principal law for road signs in Switzerland is the Road Signs Act (German: Signalisationsverordnung (SSV), French: Ordonnance du sur la signalisation routière (OSR), Italian: Ordinanza sulla segnaletica stradale (OSStr)). In Liechtenstein, it is the Road Signalling Ordinance (German: Strassensignalisationsverordnung (SSV)). The major laws are:

=== Laws of Switzerland ===
Titles in three national languages
SR/RS No.	Title	de	fr	it	ref
741.21	Road Signs Act	Signalisationsverordnung vom 5. September 1979 (SSV)	Ordonnance du 5 septembre 1979 sur la signalisation routière (OSR)	Ordinanza del 5 settembre 1979 sulla segnaletica stradale (OSStr)	
741.01	Road Traffic Act	Strassenverkehrsgesetz vom 19. Dezember 1958 (SVG)	Loi fédérale du 19 décembre 1958 sur la circulation routière (LCR)	Legge federale del 19 dicembre 1958 sulla circolazione stradale (LCStr)	
741.11	Road Traffic Rules Act	Verkehrsregelnverordnung vom 13. November 1962 (VRV)	Ordonnance du 13 novembre 1962 sur les règles de la circulation routière (OCR)	Ordinanza del 13 novembre 1962 sulle norme della circolazione stradale (ONC)	
725.111	National Roads Act	Nationalstrassenverordnung vom 7. November 2007 (NSV)	Ordonnance sur les routes nationales du 7 novembre 2007 (ORN)	Ordinanza sulle strade nazionali del 7 novembre 2007 (OSN)	

=== Laws of Liechtenstein ===
No.	Title	de	ref
741.21	Road Signs Act	Strassensignalisationsverordnung (SSV) vom 27. Dezember 1979, LGBl. 1978 Nr. 18	
	Road Traffic Law	Strassenverkehrsgesetz (SVG) vom 30. Juni 1978, LGBl. 1978 Nr. 18	
	Road Traffic Rules Act	Verkehrsregelnverordnung (VRV) vom 1. August 1978, LGBl. 1978 Nr. 19	

== Currently valid signs ==
=== Warning signs ===
1.01 Bend to right

1.02 Bend to left

1.03 Double bend, first to right

1.04 Double bend, first to left

1.05 Slippery road (Note: Panel 5.13 can be added, if there is black ice or slippery snow on road.)

1.06 Uneven road

1.07 Road narrows on both sides (Note: Panel 5.15 can be added to indicate the width of the lane/road.)

1.08 Road narrows on right

1.09 Road narrows on left

1.10 Steep gradient downwards

1.11 Steep gradient upwards

1.12 Loose chippings

1.13a Danger of falling rocks from the right

1.14 Roadworks

1.15 Level crossing with a railway with barrier or gate (Note: Panel 5.12 can be added, if regulated by turn signals.)

1.16 Railway level crossing with a railway without gate or barrier (Switzerland only)

1.18 Tramway (Switzerland only) (Note: In Chur, warning of street-running trains.)

1.22 Pedestrian crossing ahead (Note: Often panel 5.01 is added.)

1.23 Presence of children

1.24 Wild animals crossing

1.24.a Animals on road

1.25 Animals on road

1.26 Two-way traffic

1.27 Traffic lights

1.28 Airport

1.30 Other dangers (Note: Additional information will be added below the sign, e.g. panel 5.16.)

1.31 Congestion

1.32 Bicycle traffic/crossing

=== Regulatory signs ===
==== Prohibitory signs ====
2.01 Prohibition of all vehicular traffic in both directions

2.02 No entry for vehicular traffic

2.03 Prohibition of motor vehicles (on three or more wheels except for solo motorcycles, mopeds, and bicycles)

2.04 Prohibition of motorcycles

2.05 Prohibition of bicycles and mopeds

2.06 Prohibition of mopeds

2.07 Prohibition of large goods vehicles (total weight is larger than 3.5 t)

2.08 Prohibition of buses

2.09 Prohibition of trailers (of any kind, except for agricultural trailers)

2.09.1 Prohibition of trailers with exception for saddle and center axle trailers

2.10.1 Prohibition of vehicles carrying dangerous goods

2.11 Prohibition of vehicles carrying water pollutants

2.12 Prohibition of animals

2.13 Prohibition of motor vehicles and motorcycles

2.14 Prohibition of motor vehicles, motorcycles, and mopeds

2.15 Prohibition of pedestrians (Note: Includes any kind of vehicle-like transport means, e.g. rollerblades, skateboards, scooters, etc.)

2.15.1 Prohibition of skiing

2.15.2 Prohibition of sledging

2.15.3 Prohibition of any kind of vehicle-like transport means (such as rollerblades, scooters, skateboards, etc.)

2.16 Maximum weight (gross weight limit)

2.17 Axle weight (upper limit, axles closer than 1 meter apart count as one axle)

2.18 Maximum width

2.19 Maximum height

2.20 Maximum length (total length, including trailers)

==== Mandatory signs ====
2.30 Maximum speed limit

2.30.1 Generally valid speed limit within densely built-up areas; German variant

2.30.1 French variant

2.30.1 Italian variant

2.30.1 Romansh variant

2.31 Minimum speed limit

2.32 Must turn right

2.33 Must turn left

2.34 Circumvent the obstacle on the right side

2.35 Circumvent the obstacle on the left side

2.36 Must continue straight ahead

2.37 Must turn right ahead (on motorways: must change to the right road)

2.38 Must turn left ahead (on motorways: must change to the left road)

2.39 Must turn right or left

2.40 Must continue straight ahead or turn right

2.41 Must continue straight ahead or turn left

2.41.1 Roundabout

2.41.2 Mandatory direction for vehicles with dangerous goods

2.42 No right turn

2.43 No left turn

2.44 No overtaking

2.45 No overtaking by lorries

2.46 No U-turns (Note: If valid for a distance, then additional length information is shown below the sign with panel 5.03.)

2.47 Minimum distance between large goods vehicles required

2.48 Snow chains required

2.49 No stopping (Note: Often panels 5.04, 5.05, 5.06, 5.07, or 5.10 are added.)

2.50 No parking (Note: Often panels 5.04, 5.05, 5.06, 5.07, or 5.11 are added.)

2.51 Customs (Note: Stop requested, except if no control is carried out, then speed limit is 20 km/h.)

2.51 Latin languages variant

2.52 Police – must stop

2.52 Latin languages variant

2.53 End of maximum speed limit

2.53.1 End of generally valid speed limit – German variant

2.53.1 French variant

2.53.1 Italian variant

2.53.1 Romansh variant

2.54 End of minimum speed

2.55 End of no overtaking restriction

2.56 End of no overtaking by lorries restriction

2.56.1 End of part prohibition e.g. for lorries or buses (on lanes)

2.57 End of snow chain requirements

2.58 End of previous restriction(s)

2.59.1a Start of area with a 30 km/h speed limit

2.59.1e Start of area with generally applicable parking restrictions (here with applicable time constraints; Italian variant)

2.59.1c Start of parking area

2.59.2a End of area with particular speed limit

2.59.2e End of area with generally applicable parking restrictions (Italian variant)

2.59.2c End of parking area

2.59.3a Start of pedestrian area only (German variant)

2.59.3b Start of pedestrian area only (Italian variant) (Note: If driving is exceptionally allowed then pedestrians and users of vehicle-like transport means have priority)

2.59.4a End of pedestrian area (German variant)

2.59.4b End of pedestrian area (Italian variant)

2.59.5a Start of home zone (German variant) (Note: Pedestrians and users of vehicle-like transport means, such as rollerblades, scooters, skateboards, etc., are allowed to use the entire street and have priority; parking only allowed at designated places.)

2.59.5b Start of home zone (Italian variant)

2.59.6a End of home zone (German variant)

2.59.6b End of home zone (Italian variant)

2.60 Bicycle path (also applies to mopeds)

2.60.1 End of bicycle path

2.61 Pedestrian path

2.62 Bridleway

2.63 Segregated and mandatory bicycle lane on the left and pedestrian lane on the right

2.63.1 Shared bicycle and pedestrian path

2.64 Exclusive public bus/transport lane

2.65 Mandatory electric indicators above lanes (blocked lane, open lane, change to lane to the right)

=== Priority signs ===
3.01 Stop (Note: Panels 5.01 and/or 5.09 can be added.)

3.02 Give way (Note: Panels 5.01 and/or 5.09 can be added.)

3.03 Principal road with priority (Note: Panel 5.09 can be added.)

3.04 End of principal road

3.05 Crossing with a road without priority ahead

3.06 Crossroad with priority to the right rule

3.09 Give way to oncoming traffic

3.10 Priority over oncoming traffic

3.20 Level crossing with double flashing lights (Switzerland variant)

3.21 Level crossing with single flashing light (Switzerland variant)

3.22 Track level crossing (Switzerland variant)

3.24 Track level crossing (vertical, Switzerland variant)

=== Indication signs ===
==== Indication signs ====
4.01 Motorway

4.02 End of motorway

4.03 Expressway

4.04 End of expressway

4.05 Mountain postal road (Note: Priority given to public transport, such as postal bus; pay special attention to the specific three-tone-horn of the postal bus approaching hairpin bends and wait before the bend; traffic users must follow instructions given by public transport drivers.)

4.06 End of mountain postal road

4.07 Tunnel (Note: Length of tunnel can be indicated using sign 5.03.)

4.07a Tunnel ahead with distance to tunnel entrance

4.08 One-way street

4.08.1 One-way street with oncoming bicycle traffic

4.09 Dead end

4.09a Dead end, except for bicycles and pedestrians

4.10 Water protection area

4.11 Pedestrian crossing location

4.12 Pedestrian underpass (mandatory)

4.13 Pedestrian overpass (mandatory)

4.15 Passing place

4.16 Breakdown place for accidental vehicles (Note: Panels 5.57 and 5.58 can be added.)

4.17 Parking allowed (Note: Panel 5.14 can be added to indicate an exclusive parking space for handicapped people.)

4.18 Parking with parking disc

4.20 Paid parking

4.21 Parking garage

4.23 Distance and direction for particular kinds of vehicles

4.24 Escape lane

4.25 Park and ride

4.25 Indoor park and ride

4.25 Park and ride with access to train

... with access to tram

... with access to bus

==== Direction signs ====
4.27 Entry of town/village on main road

4.27 Entry of town/village on main road in Liechtenstein

4.28 End of town/village on main road (Note: Mentions next village/town above the line and distance to next major place(s) below.))

4.28 End of town/village on main road in Liechtenstein

4.29 Entry of town/village on minor road (Note: After this sign, the generally valid speed limit within a densely built-up area automatically applies.)

4.29 Entry of town/village on minor road in Liechtenstein

4.30 End of town/village on minor road

4.30 End of town/village on minor road in Liechtenstein

4.31 Signpost to destination via motor-/expressway route

4.32 Signpost to destination via main route

4.33 Signpost to destination via minor route

4.34 Detour to destination to be followed

4.34.1 (Ongoing) detour (for all destinations)

4.35 Signpost in table format (indicating direction to Zürich on main route, to Basel via motor-/expressway, and to Luzern on minor route)

4.36 Announcement of junction on main road, or on minor road connecting main roads

4.37 Announcement of junction on minor road

4.38 Announcement of junction on main road with two lanes

4.39 Announcement of junction on minor road with two separated lanes

4.40 Announcement of junction on main road with restriction for the left route (here: maximal width)

4.41 Lane routing on main road

4.42 Lane routing on minor road

4.45 Signpost for particular vehicle types (here: lorries) (Note: Often announced with panel 4.23.)

4.46 Signpost to parking place (Note: Panels 5.20–5.32 can be added.)

4.46.1 Signpost to park and ride

4.47 Signpost to campsite

4.48 Signpost to caravan site

4.49 Signpost to a company, exhibitions and others (usually found in industrial zones)

4.50.1 Recommended path for bicycles

4.50.3 Recommended track for mountain bikes

4.50.4 Recommended path for vehicle-like transport means, such as rollerblades, scooters, skateboards etc.

4.50.5 Signpost indicating directions for a particular type (here for bicycles)

4.50.6 Signpost indicating directions for different types

4.51.1 Signpost indicating direction for particularly named/numbered route

4.51.1 Routing information for bicycle path

4.51.1 Routing information for mountain bike track

4.51.2 Announcement of a turn for a particular type (here: vehicle-like transport means)

4.51.4 End route of a particular type (here for mountain bike route)

4.52 Routing information

4.53 Announcement of a detour

4.54 Announcement of roundabout on main road

4.55 Announcement of a branching road with a dangerous situation or restrictions (here: side road to the left 50 m ahead with the warning of the presence of a gated level crossing right after the turn)

===== Numbering =====
4.56 European route number

4.57 Main road number

4.58 Motor-/expressway number

4.59 Number for exits

4.59.1 Number for junctions

===== Motorways and expressways =====
4.60 First announcement of next exit

4.61 Second announcement of next exit

4.62 Start of exit

4.63 Exit sign (in German)

4.63 Exit sign (in French)

4.63 Exit sign (in Italian)

4.64 Junction board

4.65 Distance board

4.66 Announcement of junction

4.67 First information about junction ahead

4.68 Second information about junction ahead

4.69 Routing information above lane

4.70 Direction to the next emergency call pillar

4.71 Distance to police station (in German)

4.71 Distance to police station (in French)

4.71 Distance to police station (in Italian)

4.72 Kilometer sign

4.73 Hectometer sign

4.75 Information about road condition of passes and ski resorts

4.76 Advance information about road condition and requirements of certain destinations

4.77 Information about routing of lanes (reducing from three to two lanes – two lanes from the right join the one lane – left lane is derouted to the other side of the motorway)

4.77.1 Lane with restriction (here: maximal speed limit)

4.77.2 Use of hard shoulder permitted

===== Service signs =====
4.79 First aid

4.80 Roadside assistance

4.81 Telephone

4.82 Petrol/gas station (panels 5.01 and/or 5.17 are often added)

4.83 Hotel-Motel

4.84 Restaurant

4.85 Buffet or confectionery

4.79 Campsite

4.80 Caravan site

4.88 Information Center

4.89 Youth hostel

4.90 Local radio information with MHz frequency for road condition and traffic information channel

4.91 Church services (here: Romansh variant)

4.92 Fire extinguisher

4.93 Generally valid speed limits for different categories of roads in Switzerland

4.94 Emergency exit distances

4.95 Emergency exit

=== Supplementary panels ===
All signs can be combined with 1 or more supplementary panels. If a supplementary panel is accompanied by the words ausgenommen / excepté / eccettuato (excluding) or gestattet / autorisé / permesso (permitted), it means that the indicated kind of transport (e.g. bicycles (panel 5.31) or tanks (panel 5.37)) is excluded from the regulation of the main sign.

Panel 5.31 for bicycles also applies to mopeds with a designed maximum speed of 20km/h.

Generally applicable supplementary panels

5.01 Distance (to which the meaning of a sign applies)

5.02 Distance and direction

5.03 Range of validity (the range for which a danger, regulation, restriction, or an indication is valid)

5.04 Repetition (of an already valid regulation, restriction, or an indication; continues before and after the sign)

5.05 Start panel (indicates the start of a regulation for static traffic)

5.06 End panel (indicates the end of a regulation for static traffic)

5.07 Direction indicator
Supplementary panels for particular signs

5.09 Indication of the routing of a principal road (aka a road with priority)

5.10 Indicates exceptions of prohibition of stopping

5.11 Indicates exceptions of prohibition of parking

5.12 Turn signal (Switzerland only)

5.13 Black ice on road (or slippery snow on road)

5.14 Handicapped people

5.15 Width of lane/road

5.16 Shooting noise

5.17 Distance to second next petrol/gas station (Switzerland only)
Kinds of transport means

5.20 Light motor cars

5.21 Heavy motor cars

5.22 Large goods vehicles (lorries; total weight is larger than 3.5 t)

5.23 Lorries with trailer

5.24 Articulated lorries

5.25 Bus

5.26 Trailer

5.27 Caravan/Living trailer

5.28 Mobile motor home

5.29 Motor bikes

5.30 Mopeds

5.31 Bicycle

5.32 Mountain bikes

5.33 Bicycle pushing

5.34 Pedestrians

5.35 Trams or streetways

5.36 Tractors

5.37 Tanks

5.38 Groomers

5.39 Cross-country skiing

5.40 Skiing

5.41 Sledging

5.50 Airplanes/Airfield

5.51 Car transfer on train (Switzerland only)

5.52 Car transfer on ferry (Switzerland only)
Special panels

5.53 Industrial and commercial area

5.54 Customs declaration only with Sichtdeklaration / dédouanement à vue / dichiarazione a vista (combined with 2.01 on lanes: only for vehicles of this type)

5.55 S-Traffic (combined with the term ausgenommen / Excepté / eccettuato (excluding) and below the sign 2.07 indicates an exception for vehicles with corresponding signs attached to them)

5.56 Hospital with emergency department (emergency department open 24 hours)

5.57 Emergency phone

5.58 Fire extinguisher

=== Road markings ===
A number of road markings are used in Switzerland and Liechtenstein. The road markings themselves give instructions to drivers, but they may at times also be accompanied by signs giving the same or additional instructions.

6.01 Security strip (white, solid)	Designates centre of carriageway or border of lanes. Crossing, traversing, or passing over it by vehicles is not permitted.
6.02 Double security strip (white, solid)	Separates driving directions on roads with 3 or more lanes (or expressways). Crossing, traversing, or passing over it by vehicles is not permitted.
6.03 Directing strip (white, broken)	Designates either centre of carriageway on two-lane roads, or separates lanes. Crossing, traversing, passing over for overtaking is allowed.
6.04 Double strip (combination of a security strip and a directing strip on either side of the security strip)	Crossing, passing, or traversing, or starting an overtaking manoeuvre, is allowed only from the side with the broken directing strip.
6.05 Advance warning strip (white, closely broken)	Announces either security or double strips. Any overtaking manoeuvres must be completed.
6.06 Pre-selecting arrows (white)	Indicates permitted manoeuvres from each lane for a junction; the chosen direction is compulsory (corresponds to 2.31–2.36, see also 4.43). Yellow arrows indicate directions for public transport only and their permitted manoeuvres can differ.
6.07 Pull arrows (white, arranged obliquely)	Orders to leave the lane in the indicated direction.
6.08 Bus lane (yellow, solid or broken strips; BUS text in yellow)	Indicates lanes exclusive to public transport. Any exceptions to this may be indicated with the use of supplementary panels under sign 2.64. It is permitted to cross the line if the yellow strip is broken.
6.10 Stop line (white, wide, solid)	Traffic must stop at this line. Always accompanied by a stop sign. It may also be used at traffic lights (though traffic need not stop when the light is green), level crossings and on lanes for turn off traffic. Stop lines are yellow if exclusively addressed to bicycles and mopeds (e.g. on bicycle paths and lanes; see also 6.26)
6.11 Stop text (white)	May appear alongside a stop line
6.12 Longitudinal strip (white, solid)	May appear alongside a stop line
6.13 Give way line (white, small triangles in a row)	Traffic must give way at this line. Always accompanied by a give way sign. Can be combined with traffic lights (though traffic need not stop while traffic lights are working. Give way lines are yellow if exclusively addressed to bicycles and mopeds (e.g. on bicycle paths and lanes)
6.14 Announcement of give way line (white, large triangle)	May announce the give way line on main roads and important minor roads
6.15 Border strip (white, solid)	Designates the edge of a carriageway
6.16 Guidestrip (white, broken)	Visually guides traffic through a junction. They may continue stop or waiting lines, separating the side road from the main road (see example 1), or indicate the course of the principal road in cases of a turn in the principal road at a crossing (see example 2). Guidestrips do not appear on side roads with valid priority to the right rule.
Example 1	Visually guides traffic through a junction. They may continue stop or waiting lines, separating the side road from the main road (see example 1), or indicate the course of the principal road in cases of a turn in the principal road at a crossing (see example 2). Guidestrips do not appear on side roads with valid priority to the right rule.
Example 2	Visually guides traffic through a junction. They may continue stop or waiting lines, separating the side road from the main road (see example 1), or indicate the course of the principal road in cases of a turn in the principal road at a crossing (see example 2). Guidestrips do not appear on side roads with valid priority to the right rule.
6.17 Pedestrian crossing (longitudinal, wide, yellow; on cobble stones if need be white)	
6.18 Prohibition of stopping strip	Stopping voluntarily is prohibited.
6.19 Pedestrian area (yellow, two longitudinal strips on each side connected by bias bindings)	Area marked on roads for use by pedestrians only
6.20 Restricted area (white, shaded and framed)	Visually guides traffic; crossing, traversing, or passing is strictly prohibited.
6.21 Zigzag lines (yellow)	Designate public bus stop area. Parking is prohibited. It can be used to pick up or drop off passengers, but only if public traffic is in no way obstructed.
6.22 Prohibition of parking strip (yellow, longitudinal strip broken with diagonal crosses)	
6.23 Prohibition of parking area (yellow, framed, diagonally crossed)	Exclusive parking for designated traffic users, indicated by the word TAXI or a license plate number. If labelled, it can be used to pick up or drop off passengers, but only if valid traffic user is in no way obstructed.
Parking (usually marked by white, blue, red, or yellow solid strips)	Parking spaces can be signposted (see 4.17–4.21) and/or marked by white (parking free, unless signposted with 4.20; or 4.18), blue, or red solid strips (sometimes only indicated by partial markings); blue markings indicate Blue Zone parking spaces with mandatory use of parking disc/card; red markings indicate Red Zone parking spaces (exist only in a few cantons); yellow parking spaces are reserved for private or special purposes (prohibited to the general public). In areas with parking markings, it is prohibited to park anywhere else; only parking spaces of appropriate size for the relevant vehicle type, whether bicycle/moped, motorbike, car, bus (indicated by word CAR) or lorries should be used. Blue Zones can be indicated by a thick white-blue crossline at the start and a thick blue-white crossline at the end of the zone.
6.25 Prohibition of stopping strip (yellow, longitudinal solid strip with endings)	Voluntarily stopping is prohibited
6.26 Extended bicycle lane (waiting area placed in front of stop line with an additional yellow stop line and a bicycle icon in front of the white stop line)	During red traffic light bicycles and mopeds are allowed to wait in front of first motor vehicle and next to each other, motor vehicles must stop in front of the white stop line; when traffic light becomes green, motor vehicles must show patience and give way to bicycles and mopeds in front of them in order to let them clear the crossing first.
6.30 Guide post, right	Placed on the right-hand side of the carriageway, facing the driver on the right. It can also appear on the left-hand side of the carriageway on roads with either separated directions or without oncoming traffic.
6.31 Guide post, left	Placed on the left-hand side of the carriageway, facing the driver on the right.

=== Traffic lights ===
Working traffic light signals (not turned off or not flashing yellow) take precedence over priority signs, road markings, and general road rules. A yellow flashing traffic light signals a need for special caution, and the general road rules, priority signs, and road markings must be applied and followed (including in particular stop signs or give way signs and all other priority signs, as well as direction indications). White traffic lights are addressed to public transport only.

Traffic signals containing direction indications apply only for the (lane with) corresponding direction(s) – traffic is required to follow the indicated direction. All traffic light rules apply to bicycles and mopeds as well, but can be exclusively addressed to them by showing a bicycle icon.

General signals
7.0.1	Usual vertical composition (red to the top)
7.0.2	Horizontal composition (red to the left)
7.1 Stop	Valid for all road users unless accompanied by additional traffic lights addressed to particular road users (e.g. bicycles and mopeds); motor vehicles must stop in front of the stop line. Flashing red lights are only used at level crossings and have the same meaning.
7.2 Yellow and red light together	An indication to be ready to start again and to wait for the green light. Drivers must give way to any bicycles/mopeds in front of the vehicle in the case of an extended bicycle lane.
7.3 Green light	Traffic may proceed. Turning vehicles must give way both to oncoming traffic and to people crossing on side roads, who are usually permitted to cross the side at the same time.
7.4 Yellow light (not flashing)	Appears after the green light. Vehicles must stop, if it is possible to do so in a reasonable manner.
Signals containing a direction indication
7.10 Red light with direction indication	
7.11 Yellow light with direction indication	
7.12 Green arrow	Traffic may proceed, following the indicated direction(s).
7.13 Direction panel	Alternative version.
7.14.1 Green arrow to the left with additional flashing yellow	Permits traffic to turn to the left. Turning vehicles must give way both to oncoming traffic and to people crossing on side roads, who are usually permitted to cross the side at the same time.
7.14.2 Green arrow to the right with additional flashing yellow	Permits traffic to turn to the right. Turning vehicles must give way to people crossing on side roads, who are usually permitted to cross the side at the same time.
Signals that apply exclusively to bicycles and mopeds
7.20	
7.20.1	Alternative version with a bicycle icon on the panel.
7.21	Direction panel exclusively addressed to bicycles and mopeds.
7.21.1	Alternative version with a bicycle icon on the panel.

=== Police instruction signs ===
==== Blue Zone parking disc ====
When parking in a Blue Zone, it is mandatory to set and display a blue parking disc with the time of arrival according to the Blue Zone Rules. Parking in a blue zone space is limited to 1 hour unless otherwise indicated. No part of a parked vehicle, including bumpers, may protrude outside the marked parking space.

Blue disks are available in various places, such as police stations, hotels, tourist offices, newsstands, the local Gemeinde/Town hall, garages and gas stations.

==== Blue Zone parking rules ====
===== From Monday to Saturday =====
The disc must be set to the exact time, or to the next half-hour mark if the exact time is not printed on the disc.

Arrival time	Parking allowed
8:00 to 11:29 a.m.	For 1 hour after set time (half-an-hour accurate)
11:30 a.m. to 1:29 p.m.	Until 2:30 p.m.
1:30 to 5:59 p.m.	For 1 hour after set time (half-an-hour accurate)
6:00 p.m. to 7:59 a.m.	Until 9:00 a.m.
7:00 p.m. to 7:59 a.m.	Blue disc not needed if vehicle removed by 8:00 a.m.

From 6:00 p.m. Saturday to 7:59 a.m. Monday, blue-zone parking is free and no blue disc is needed, if not otherwise indicated.

In blue zones marked with a 4-digit area code, parking is free for those with a valid parking permit for that specific area code. For those without the corresponding parking permit, regular Blue Zone parking rules apply.

== Historic signs ==
=== 1932 road signs ===
Urban area

Direction sign

Advance direction sign

=== 1963 road signs ===
Tunnel

Other dangers

Hospital

=== 1979 road signs ===
Stop (according to the previous law)

Stop

== See also ==
- Comparison of European road signs
