= Zehender family =

Patrician family of Bern, Switzerland

The Zehender family (also von Zehender) was a patrician family of the city of Bern. It descended from Niklaus (died 1378), a councillor of Aarau, and bore the particle von from 1862. Until the second half of the 17th century it was one of the families with the most members in Bern's Grand Council. The family died out in the male line with the ophthalmologist Karl Wilhelm (1819–1916).

== History ==
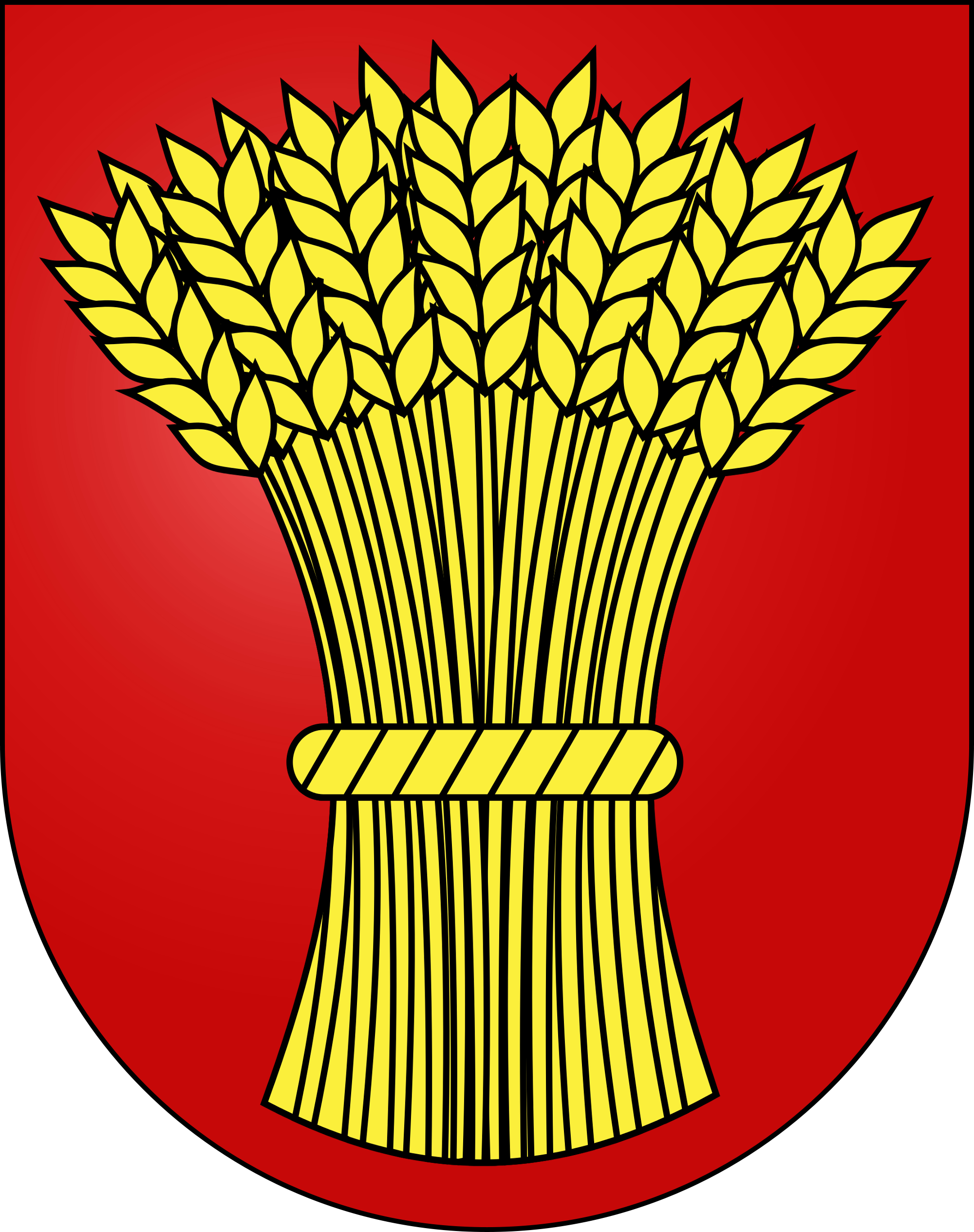
Coat of arms of the Zehender family

The family goes back to Niklaus (died 1378), a member of the council of Aarau. After it had provided three Schultheissen (chief magistrates) in Aarau, Hans Ulrich (1501–1545) acquired citizenship of Bern (Burgerrecht) and membership rights (Stubenrecht) in the Mittellöwen guild in 1528, and in 1531 he entered the Grand Council of Bern. Until the 18th century the family branched out widely, and until the second half of the 17th century it was one of the families with the most members in the Grand Council. Three members of the family rose from the Grand Council to the Small Council, among them Marquard and his son Marquard.

In the 16th century the Zehenders held the lordship of Daillens, and in the first half of the 17th century they were co-lords of Worb. Anton (1609–1679) held the lordships of Syens, Rossens, Bussy, and Combremont in the bailiwick of Moudon, as well as Rosières in the Val-de-Travers; these lordships passed down in the family until the beginning of the 18th century.

From the end of the 17th century the family was increasingly pushed out of the Grand Council, without leaving it entirely. The Zehenders now worked more often as clerks or pastors, and turned above all to French and imperial mercenary service, and later to Dutch and Sardinian service. The few craftsmen in the family were mainly goldsmiths. As the family was pushed out of the Grand Council, the circle into which the Zehenders married shifted in the 18th century from the ruling to the non-ruling burghers of Bern. In the 19th century some members of the family emigrated to England and the United States, but they left no male descendants. The family died out in the male line with the ophthalmologist Karl Wilhelm (1819–1916).

== Bibliography ==
- B. von Rodt, Genealogien burgerlicher Geschlechter der Stadt Bern, 6, 392–434 (manuscript, 1950, Burgerbibliothek Bern)
- Schweizerisches Geschlechterbuch, 2, 611–618
