= Carl Wilhelm von Zehender =

German ophthalmologist (1819–1916)

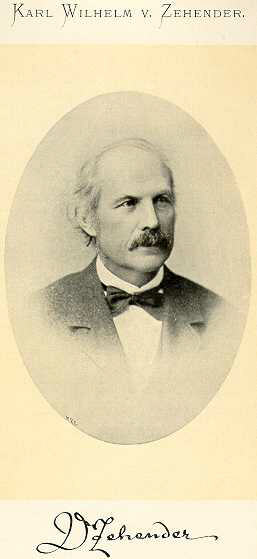
Carl Wilhelm von Zehender (1819=1916)

Carl Wilhelm von Zehender (21 May 1819 – 19 December 1916) was a German ophthalmologist born in Bremen.

He studied medicine at the universities of Göttingen, Jena and Kiel, receiving his doctorate in 1845. He studied ophthalmology in Paris as a pupil of Louis-Auguste Desmarres, then furthered his education in Prague, Vienna and Berlin. He worked at an ophthalmic practice in Neustrelitz, and in 1862 was named a professor of ophthalmology at the University of Bern. From 1866 to 1889 he was a professor of ophthalmology at the University of Rostock (rector 1875/76), then afterwards he relocated to Munich, where he remained until 1907. He died in Rostock in 1916 at the age of 97.

Zehender is considered a pioneer of ophthalmic microsurgery, as in 1886 he introduced the practice of using a compound binocular vision instrument for ophthalmologic examination.

He was a founder and editor (1863–1899) of the ophthalmic journal Klinische Monatsblaetter fur Augenheilkunde, and was instrumental in the creation of the Heidelberger Ophthalmologische Gesellschaft, which was predecessor to the Deutsche Ophthalmologische Gesellschaft.
