= Marquard Zehender (politician, born 1581) =

Swiss politician (1581 – c. 1638)

- Baptised: 22 March 1581; Bern
- Died: before 19 February 1638
- Occupation: Politician
- Spouses: Elisabeth Wurstemberger (m. 1601) Anna von Diesbach (m. 1622)
- Father: Marquard Zehender

Marquard Zehender (baptized 22 March 1581 – before 19 February 1638) was a Bernese politician. He was a member of the Small Council of Bern and bailiff of Landshut and Lausanne, and from 1635 he was treasurer of the French-speaking lands (Welschseckelmeister) and commander-in-chief of Vaud.

== Biography ==
Marquard Zehender was a member of the Zehender family. He was the son of Marquard Zehender. In 1601 he married Elisabeth Wurstemberger, daughter of Hans Rudolf, a bailiff and baron of Vesancy in the Pays de Gex. In 1622 he married, secondly, Anna von Diesbach, daughter of Niklaus, a member of the Small Council and lord of Diessbach.

Zehender spent periods of study in Heidelberg, Bremen, and Oxford. From 1604 he was a member of the Grand Council of Bern. He was bailiff (Landvogt) of Landshut from 1610 to 1616, became a member of the Small Council in 1620, and was bailiff of Lausanne from 1624 to 1630. From 1634 to 1637 he was salt director (Salzdirektor), and from 1635 treasurer of the French-speaking lands and commander-in-chief of Vaud (Oberkommandant der Waadt). He was several times an envoy to the Federal Diet (Tagsatzung).

== Bibliography ==
- S. Kirchberger, I. Steiger, Bernisches Staatsbuch, 6, 815 (manuscript, undated, Burgerbibliothek Bern)
- B. von Rodt, Genealogien burgerlicher Geschlechter der Stadt Bern, 6, 399 (manuscript, 1950, Burgerbibliothek Bern)
