= Marquard Zehender (politician, born 1542) =

Swiss politician (1542 – 1610 or 1611)

- Born: 1542
- Died: 1610 or 1611 probably Bern
- Occupation: Politician
- Spouse: Magdalena Herbort (m. 1564)
- Children: Marquard Zehender
- Relatives: Samuel Zehender (brother)

Marquard Zehender (born 1542; died 1610 or 1611) was a Bernese politician. He was a member of the Small Council of Bern, bailiff of Nyon, Aigle, and Lausanne, and several times an envoy to the Federal Diet and to France and Savoy.

== Biography ==
Marquard Zehender was a member of the Zehender family. He was the son of Hans Ulrich, a bailiff, and Christina Zum Bach. In 1564 he married Magdalena Herbort, daughter of Beat, a cloth merchant and bailiff. His son of the same name, Marquard, also rose to the Small Council.

From 1564 Zehender was clerk of the consistory (Chorgerichtsschreiber), succeeding his late brother Samuel, and from 1565 he was a member of the Grand Council of Bern. He was bailiff (Landvogt) of Nyon from 1572 to 1578 and became a member of the Small Council in 1580. In 1582 he was the council's master of the arsenal (Zeugherr), from 1583 to 1585 bailiff of Aigle, in 1588 the council's collector of the Böspfennig (Böspfenniger), and from 1588 to 1594 bailiff of Lausanne. He was several times an envoy to the Federal Diet (Tagsatzung) and to France and Savoy. He died in 1610 or 1611, probably in Bern.

== Bibliography ==
- I. Steiger, S. Kirchberger, Bernisches Staatsbuch, 6, 815 (manuscript, undated, Burgerbibliothek Bern)
- M. Sulser, Der Stadtschreiber Peter Cyro und die bernische Kanzlei zur Zeit der Reformation, 1922, 174–176
- B. von Rodt, Genealogien burgerlicher Geschlechter der Stadt Bern, 6, 397 (manuscript, 1950, Burgerbibliothek Bern)
