= La Neuveville District =

Coordinates: 47.05°N 7.08333°E

La Neuveville District District de La Neuveville
- District
- Flag Coat of arms

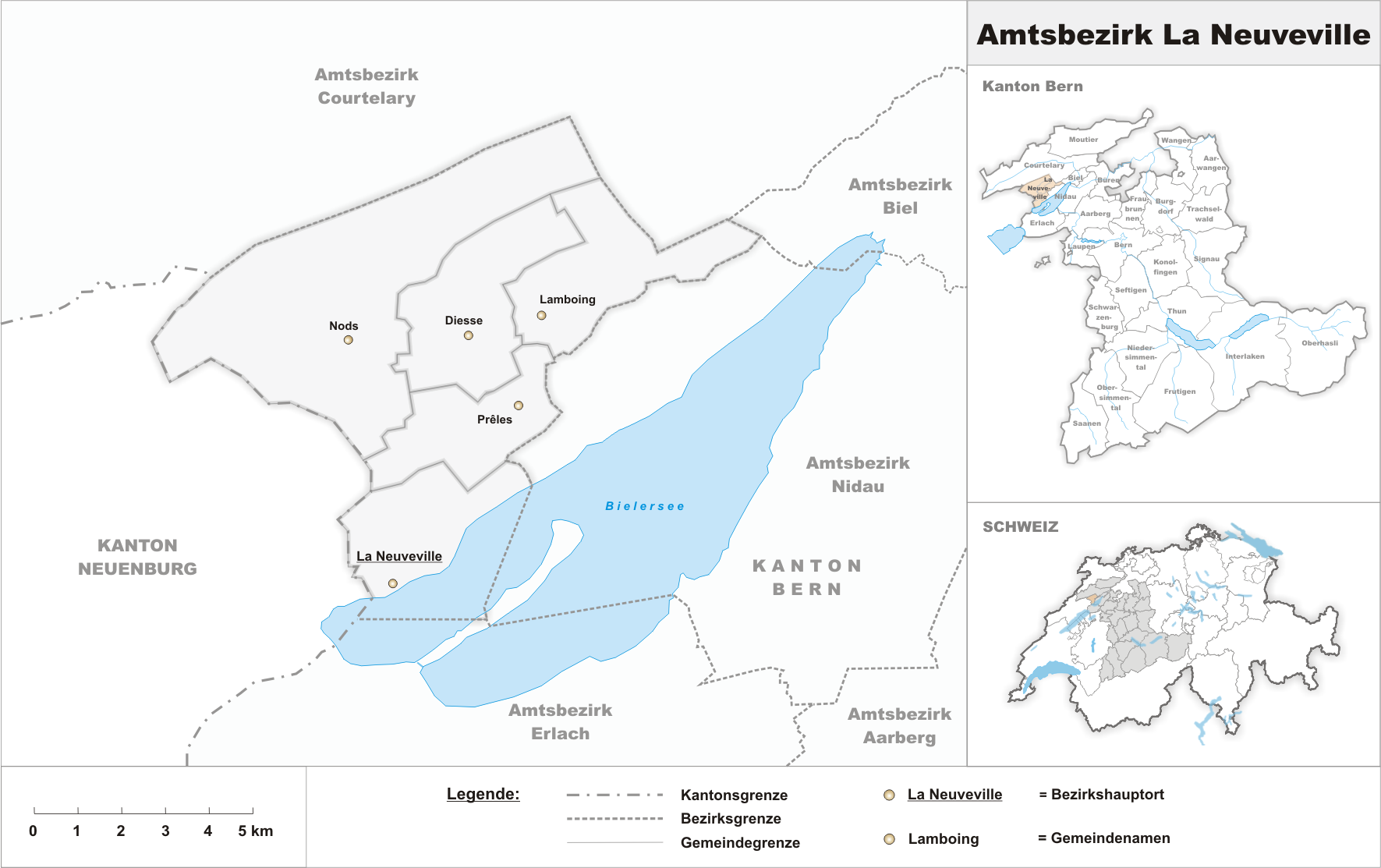
- Country: Switzerland
- Canton: Bern
- Capital: La Neuveville

Area
  - Total: 59 km^{2} (23 sq mi)

Population (2007)
  - Total: 6,140
  - Density: 100/km^{2} (270/sq mi)
- Time zone: UTC+1 (CET)
  - Summer (DST): UTC+2 (CEST)
- Municipalities: 5

La Neuveville District is one of three French-speaking districts of the Bernese Jura in the canton of Bern with the seat being La Neuveville, the other two being Courtelary and Moutier. It had a population of about 6,083 in 2004.

From 1 January 2010, the district lost its administrative power while being replaced by the Bernese Jura administrative district, whose administrative centre is Courtelary.

Since 2010, it remains therefore a fully recognised district under the law and the Constitution (Art.3 al.2) of the Canton of Berne.

Municipalities	Population (2007)	Area (km^{2})
Diesse	421	9.44
Lamboing	668	9.10
La Neuveville	3457	6.80
Nods BE	727	26.70
Prêles	867	6.98
