= Plateau de Diesse =

- Municipality
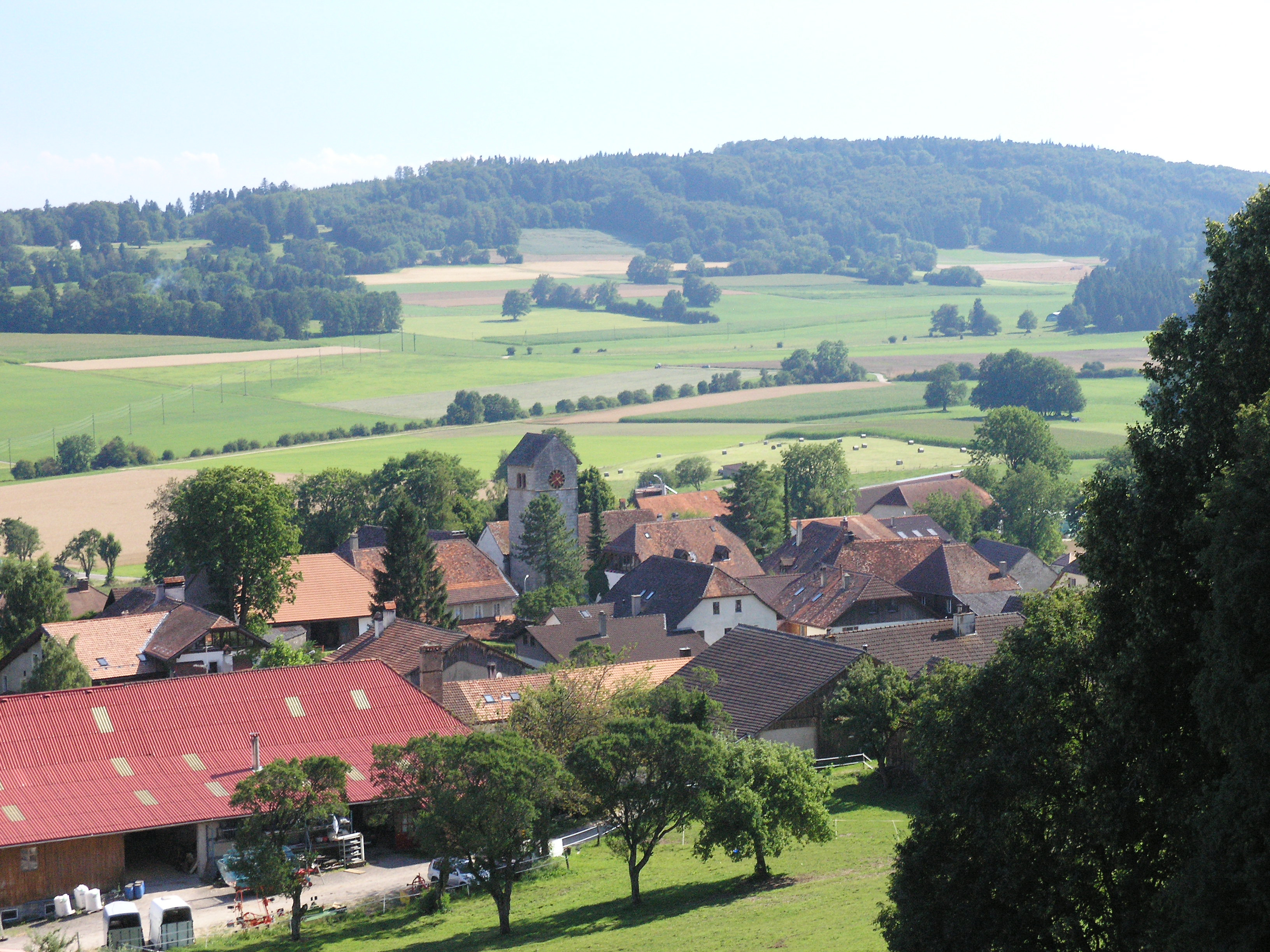
- Diesse village and the surrounding plateau

- Flag Coat of arms
- Location of Plateau de Diesse
- Location within Switzerland Location within Canton of Bern
- Coordinates: 47°7′N 7°7′E
- Country: Switzerland
- Canton: Bern
- District: Jura bernois

Government
  - Mayor: Maire; Catherine Favre Alves

Area
  - Total: 25.55 km^{2} (9.86 sq mi)

Population (Dec 2012)
  - Total: 2,053
  - Density: 80.35/km^{2} (208.1/sq mi)
- Time zone: UTC+01:00 (CET)
  - Summer (DST): UTC+02:00 (CEST)
- Postal code: 2515-17
- SFOS number: 726
- ISO 3166 code: CH-BE
- Surrounded by: Nods, Twann-Tüscherz, Evilard, Orvin, Ligerz, La Neuveville, Lignières (NE)
- Website: www.leplateaudediesse.ch

Plateau de Diesse (French pronunciation: [plato də djɛs]) is a municipality in the Jura bernois administrative district in the canton of Bern in Switzerland, located in the French-speaking Bernese Jura (Jura Bernois). On 1 January 2014 the former municipalities of Diesse, Lamboing and Prêles merged into the municipality of Plateau de Diesse.

== History ==
=== Diesse ===
Diesse is first mentioned in 1178 as Diesse. In German it was known as Tess though this is no longer commonly used.

The parish church of Diesse was first mentioned in 1185. Beginning in 1530 the Protestant Reformation gradually gained power until the parish switched to the new faith in 1554. Until 1798, Diesse was the capital of the district of Tessenberg. Following the 1798 French invasion, Diesse became part of France, where it remained until the Congress of Vienna returned it to Bern. The village school was built in 1850–56. The village's population slowly declined until the 1980s, when commuters to the surrounding towns began to move into Diesse.

=== Lamboing ===
Lamboing is first mentioned in 1179 as Lamboens though this document is thought to be a forgery from the late 12th Century. In 1235 it was mentioned as Lamboens.

The noble de Lamboing family was first mentioned in a document from 1255. But very little is known about this family. In 1423 the de Vaumarcus family were given the village as a fief, which they held until 1509. In that year the village was acquired by the Prince-Bishopric of Basel who ruled over the village for almost three centuries. After the 1798 French invasion, Lamboing became part of the French Département of Mont-Terrible. Three years later, in 1800 it became part of the Département of Haut-Rhin. After Napoleon's defeat and the Congress of Vienna, Lamboing was assigned to the Canton of Bern in 1815. A village school house was built in 1863. During the late 19th century a watchmaker's workshop opened in the village. It was acquired by the Ebauches SA company in 1926 and continued making components for watches until 1981. Beginning in the 1970s the village's population began to grow as commuters settled in Lamboing.

It has always been part of the parish of Diesse. When Diesse converted to the new faith of the Protestant Reformation between 1530 and 1554, Lamboing converted as well.

=== Prêles ===
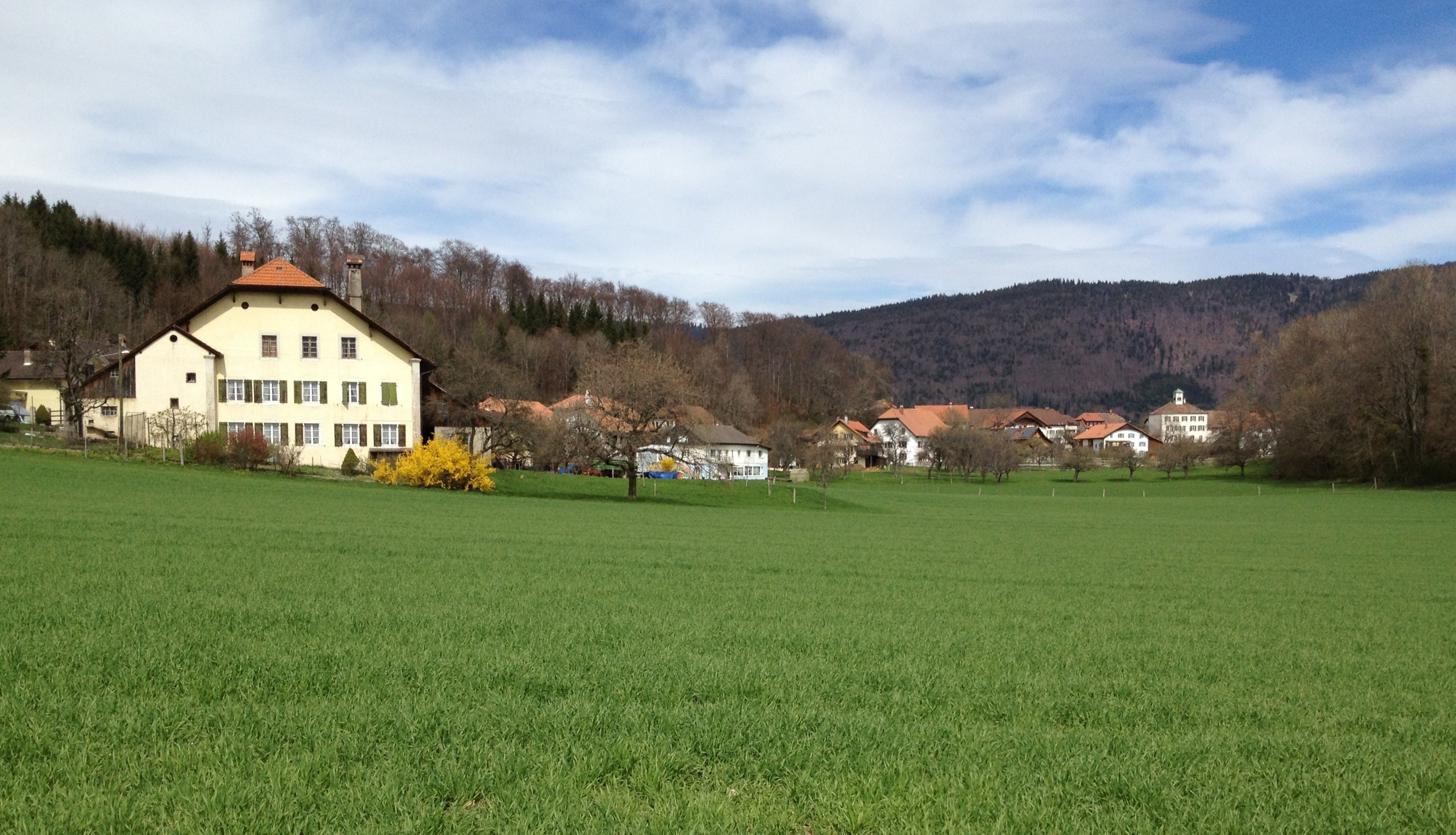
Prêles village

Prêles is first mentioned in 1179 as Prales though this document is believed to be a 12th-century forgery. In 1185 it was mentioned as Preles and it used to be known by its German name Prägelz.

Beginning in the 12th century the noble de Perls family first appears in records. The family existed for several centuries before vanishing from records in the 15th century. Throughout its history the village was part of the Herrschaft of Tessenberg (Diesse). The major landowners in the village included the collegiate church of Saint-Imier and Erlach Abbey. It was part of the parish of Diesse and accepted the Protestant Reformation along with the rest of the parish between 1530 and 1554.

After the 1798 French invasion, Prêles became part of the French Département of Mont-Terrible. Three years later, in 1800 it became part of the Département of Haut-Rhin. After Napoleon's defeat and the Congress of Vienna, Prêles was assigned to the Canton of Bern in 1815. Initially it was part of the District of Erlach but in 1846 it became part of the La Neuveville District.

The construction of a cable railway between Ligerz and Prêles in 1912 turned it into a minor tourist destination. Until the 1950s agriculture was the most important industry in the village. Today many residents commute to jobs in Biel or La Neuveville. In the past decades a number of new houses were built for the growing commuter population.

== Geography ==
The former municipalities that now make up Plateau de Diesse have a total combined area of 25.55 km^{2} (9.86 sq mi).

== Demographics ==
The total population of Plateau de Diesse (as of December 2020) is 2,056.

== Historic population ==
The historical population is given in the following chart:

== Sights ==
The entire village of Diesse is designated as part of the Inventory of Swiss Heritage Sites.
