= Ligerz railway station =

Former railway station in Ligerz, Bern, Switzerland

Ligerz
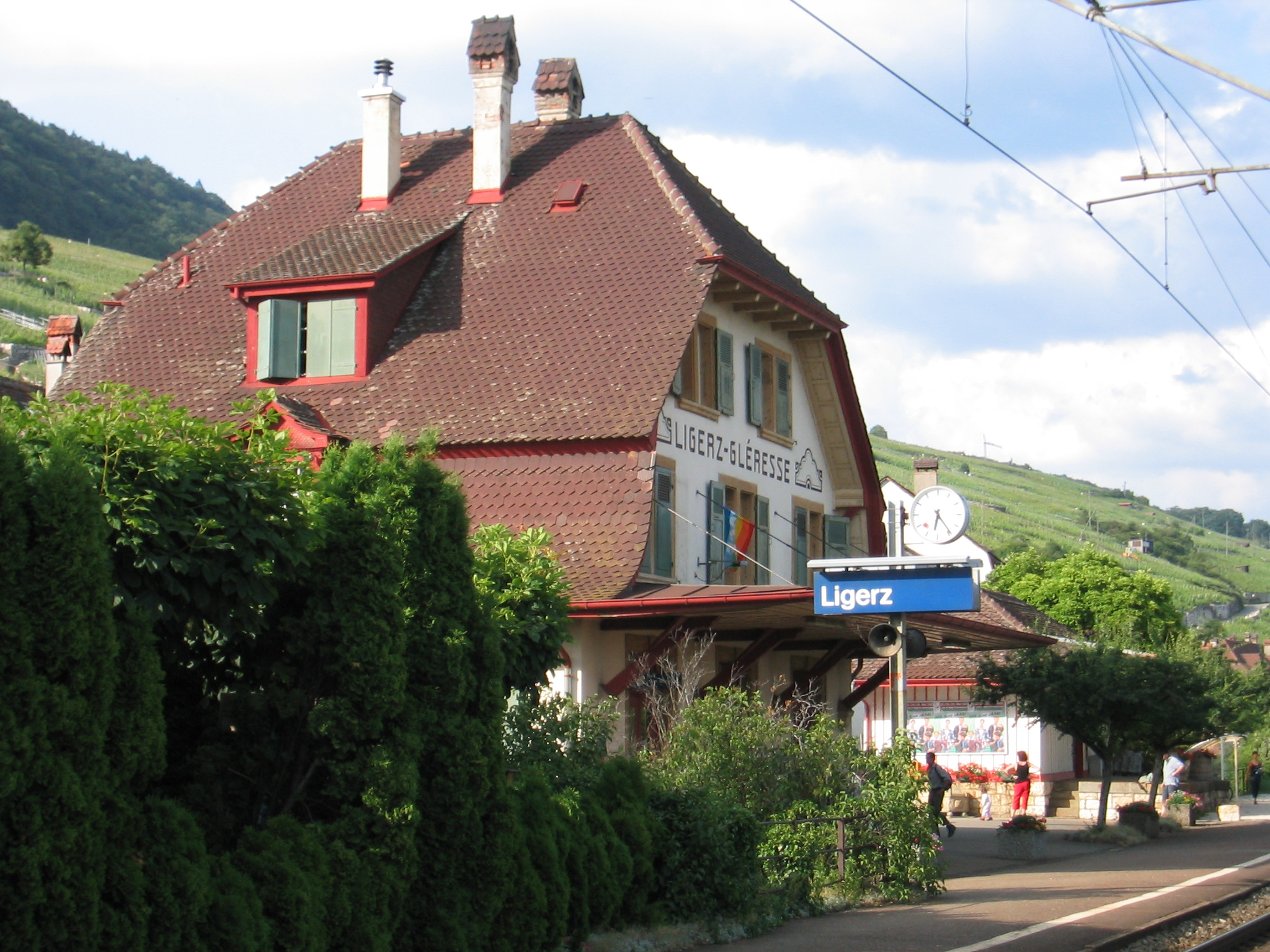
- The station building in 2003

General information
- Location: Ligerz; Switzerland
- Coordinates: 47°05′02″N 7°08′07″E
- Elevation: 433 m (1,421 ft)
- Owner: Swiss Federal Railways
- Line: Jura Foot line
- Distance: 94.0 km (58.4 mi) from Lausanne
- Platforms: 1 side platform
- Tracks: 1
- Connections: BSG ferries on Lake Biel; Vinifuni Ligerz–Prêles funicular to Prêles; PostAuto AG bus line

Construction
- Cycle facilities: Yes (10 spaces)
- Accessible: No

Other information
- Station code: 8504227 (LIG)
Location

Ligerz railway station (German: Bahnhof Ligerz, French: Gare de Gléresse) is a closed railway station in the municipality of Ligerz, in the Swiss canton of Bern. It is an intermediate stop on the standard gauge Jura Foot line of Swiss Federal Railways. The station closed in December 2024 as part of the building of the Ligerz Tunnel, scheduled to open in 2029. A regular bus service was introduced between La Neuveville and Twann due to the closure of the station.

It is located next to Ligerz (Talstation), the lower station of the funicular Vinifuni Ligerz–Prêles, and Ligerz (Schiff), the landing stage for passenger ships of Lake Biel.
