= Tüscherz-Alfermée =

- Former municipality
- Flag Coat of arms
- Location of Tüscherz-Alfermée
- Location within Switzerland Location within Canton of Bern
- Coordinates: 47°6′N 7°11′E
- Country: Switzerland
- Canton: Bern
- District: Nidau

Area
  - Total: 3.3 km^{2} (1.3 sq mi)
- Elevation: 444 m (1,457 ft)

Population (December 2007)
  - Total: 309
  - Density: 94/km^{2} (240/sq mi)
- Time zone: UTC+01:00 (CET)
  - Summer (DST): UTC+02:00 (CEST)
- Postal code: 2512
- SFOS number: 752
- ISO 3166 code: CH-BE
- Surrounded by: Biel/Bienne, Ipsach, Lamboing, Evilard, Nidau, Sutz-Lattrigen, Twann
- Website: SFSO statistics

Tüscherz-Alfermée, Daucher-Alfermée in French, was a municipality in the district of Nidau in the Swiss canton of Bern. On 1 January 2010 the municipalities of Tüscherz-Alfermée and Twann merged into the municipality of Twann-Tüscherz.

== History ==
Tüscherz is first mentioned in 1230 as Tusschiers. In 1267 it was mentioned as Tuschers. Alfermée is first mentioned in 1276 as Alphermme.

Tüscherz and Alfermée were part of the lands of the Counts of Neuchatel-Nidau, until 1388 when the counts died out and the land was acquired by Bern. Originally it was part of the parish of Sutz which was located on the opposite side of the lake. The priest at Sutz allowed the Mass to be read in the chapel above Tüscherz. After the Protestant Reformation the chapel was closed, but it remained part of the Sutz parish until the parish was dissolved in 1876. Tüscherz and Alfermée then became part of the parish of Twann. In 2010 the parishes of Twann / Tüscherz-Alfermée and Ligerz merged to become the Pilgerweg Bielersee parish.

Viticulture and fishing dominated the villages, because there was little land for growing grain. Some of the residents even rented fields across the lake in Sutz. Many of the vineyards were owned by monasteries, hospitals and lower nobility or burghers of Bern, Biel/Bienne and Nidau. Several vineyard estates were owned by St. Urban's Abbey, including the Schünen estate which was bought in 1256 and later abandoned and the Convalet estate which was owned by the Abbey until 1848. In the 18th century it was expanded into a large manor house but it was demolished in 1859. The Biel/Bienne road (built in 1838), the Biel-Neuchatel railroad (built 1860) and the A5 motorway (1973) isolate the villages from the lake. The lower village of Alfermée was built on land won from the lake after the Jura water correction in 1868-91 but was demolished in 1969 to clear land for the motorway. Until 1973 the primary school was located in the municipality, then it relocated to Twann. The vineyards are still an important industry, though now about two-thirds of the working population commute to Biel/Bienne for work.

== Geography ==
Tüscherz-Alfermée has an area of 3.3 km^{2} (1.3 sq mi). Of this area, 6.3% is used for agricultural purposes, while 84.9% is forested. Of the rest of the land, 7.2% is settled (buildings or roads) and the remainder (1.5%) is non-productive (rivers, glaciers or mountains).

== Demographics ==
Tüscherz-Alfermée has a population (as of 2007) of 309, of which 8.4% are foreign nationals. Over the last 10 years the population has grown at a rate of 11.2%. Most of the population (as of 2000) speaks German (87.3%), with French being second most common (9.5%) and Portuguese being third (1.4%).

In the 2007 election the most popular party was the FDP which received 30% of the vote. The next three most popular parties were the SVP (28.5%), the SPS (22%) and the Green Party (6.6%).

The age distribution of the population (as of 2000) is children and teenagers (0–19 years old) make up 15.5% of the population, while adults (20–64 years old) make up 60.8% and seniors (over 64 years old) make up 23.7%. The entire Swiss population is generally well educated. In Tüscherz-Alfermée about 75.8% of the population (between age 25-64) have completed either non-mandatory upper secondary education or additional higher education (either University or a Fachhochschule).

Tüscherz-Alfermée has an unemployment rate of 1.58%. As of 2005, there were 33 people employed in the primary economic sector and about 14 businesses involved in this sector. 6 people are employed in the secondary sector and there are 2 businesses in this sector. 20 people are employed in the tertiary sector, with 7 businesses in this sector. The historical population is given in the following table:

year	population
764	165
1850	262
1880	385
1900	309
1941	248
1950	304
