= Prêles =

- Former municipality
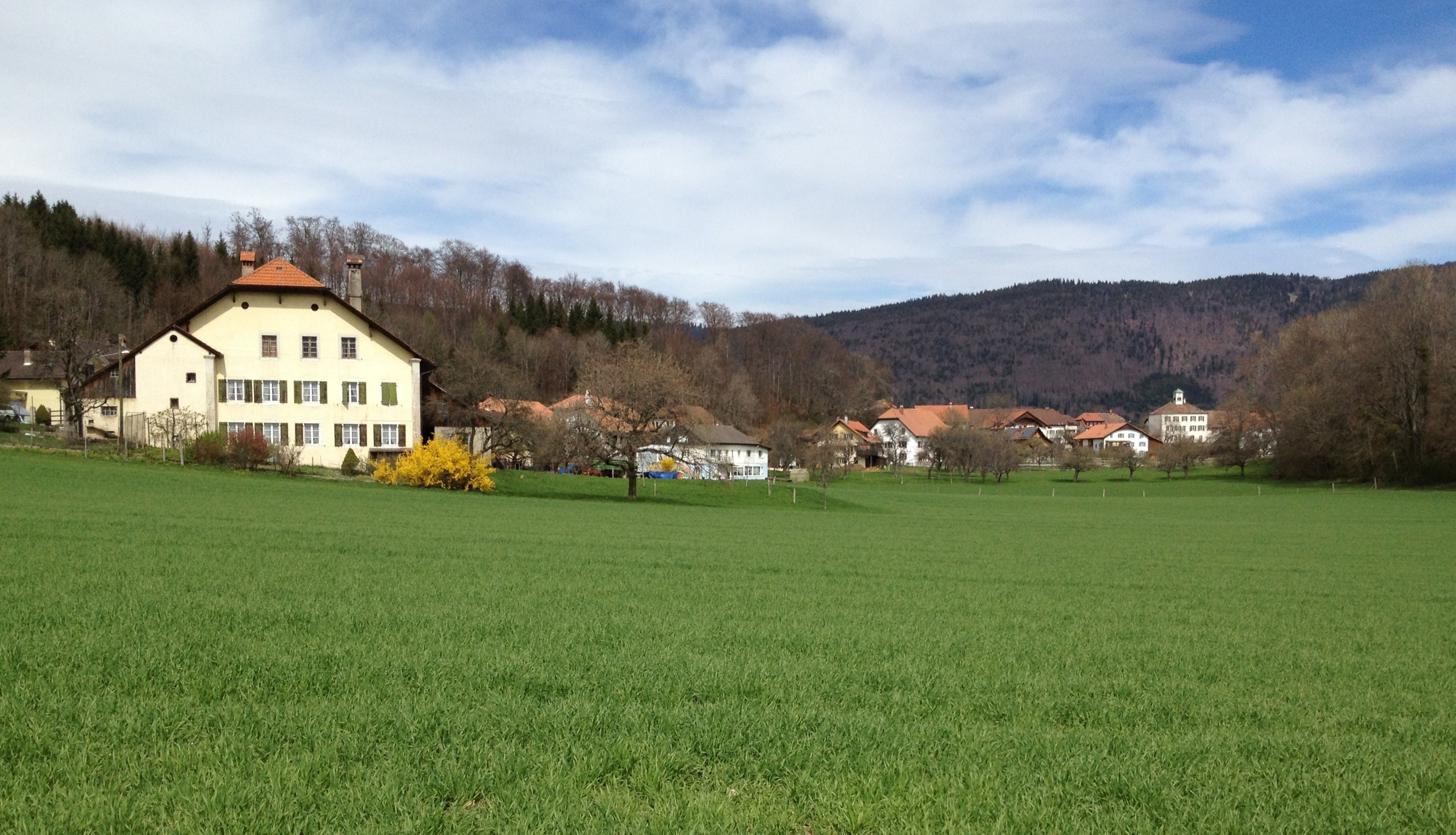
- Prêles village

- Flag Coat of arms
- Location of Prêles
- Location within Switzerland Location within Canton of Bern
- Coordinates: 47°6′N 7°8′E
- Country: Switzerland
- Canton: Bern
- District: Jura bernois

Area
  - Total: 6.98 km^{2} (2.69 sq mi)
- Elevation: 822 m (2,697 ft)

Population (Dec 2011)
  - Total: 908
  - Density: 130/km^{2} (337/sq mi)
- Time zone: UTC+01:00 (CET)
  - Summer (DST): UTC+02:00 (CEST)
- Postal code: 2515
- SFOS number: 725
- ISO 3166 code: CH-BE
- Surrounded by: Nods, Diesse, Lamboing, Twann, Ligerz, La Neuveville, Lignières (NE)
- Website: www.preles.ch

Prêles (French pronunciation: [pʁɛl]; German name: Prägelz) is a former municipality in the Jura bernois administrative district in the canton of Bern in Switzerland, located in the French-speaking Bernese Jura (Jura Bernois).

The proposed merger of the municipalities of Diesse, Lamboing, Nods and Prêles into the new municipality of Le Plateau de Diesse was rejected by voters. However, on 1 January 2014 the former municipalities of Prêles, Diesse and Lamboing merged into the new municipality of Plateau de Diesse.

== History ==
Prêles is first mentioned in 1179 as Prales though this document is believed to be a 12th-century forgery. In 1185 it was mentioned as Preles and it used to be known by its German name Prägelz.

Beginning in the 12th century the noble de Perls family first appears in records. The family existed for several centuries before vanishing from records in the 15th century. Throughout its history the village was part of the Herrschaft of Tessenberg (Diesse). The major landowners in the village included the collegiate church of Saint-Imier and Erlach Abbey. It was part of the parish of Diesse and accepted the Protestant Reformation along with the rest of the parish between 1530 and 1554.

After the 1798 French invasion, Prêles became part of the French Département of Mont-Terrible. Three years later, in 1800 it became part of the Département of Haut-Rhin. After Napoleon's defeat and the Congress of Vienna, Prêles was assigned to the Canton of Bern in 1815. Initially it was part of the District of Erlach but in 1846 it became part of the La Neuveville District.

The construction of a cable railway between Ligerz and Prêles in 1912 turned it into a minor tourist destination. Until the 1950s agriculture was the most important industry in the village. Today many residents commute to jobs in Biel or La Neuveville. In the past decades a number of new houses were built for the growing commuter population.

== Geography ==
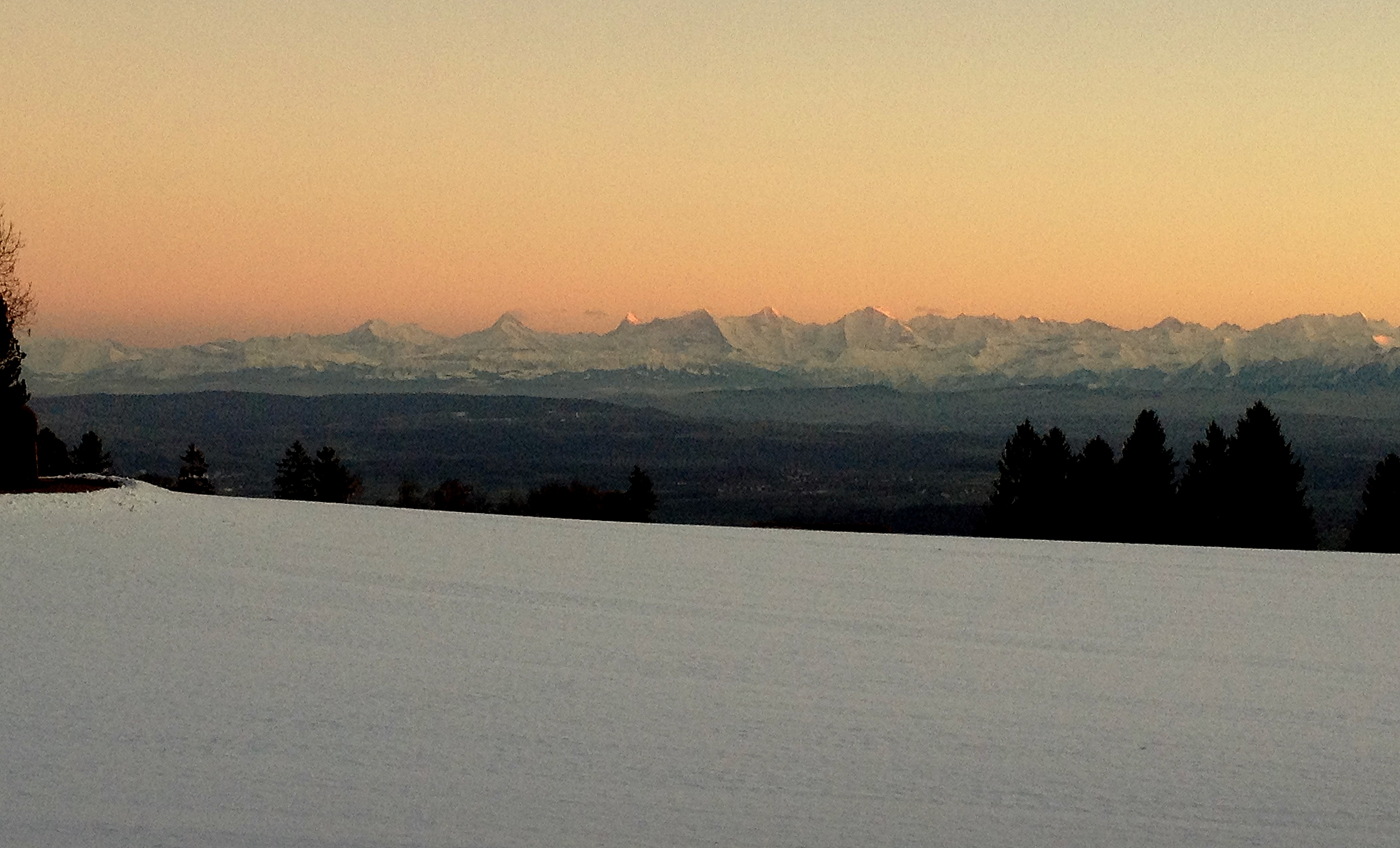
View of the Bernese Alps from Prêles

Before the merger, Prêles had a total area of 7.0 km^{2} (2.7 mi^{2}). As of 2012, a total of 4.37 km^{2} (1.69 mi^{2}) or 62.8% is used for agricultural purposes, while 1.89 km^{2} (0.73 mi^{2}) or 27.2% is forested. Of the rest of the land, 0.73 km^{2} (0.28 mi^{2}) or 10.5% is settled (buildings or roads) and 0.02 km^{2} (4.9 acres) or 0.3% is unproductive land.

During the same year, housing and buildings made up 6.0% and transportation infrastructure made up 2.7%. while parks, green belts and sports fields made up 1.6%. Out of the forested land, 23.1% of the total land area is heavily forested and 4.0% is covered with orchards or small clusters of trees. Of the agricultural land, 37.4% is used for growing crops and 23.1% is pastures and 1.7% is used for alpine pastures.

The former municipality is located on the Plateau de Diesse. It consists of the village of Prêles and the hamlet of Châtillon.

On 31 December 2009 District de la Neuveville, the municipality's former district, was dissolved. On the following day, 1 January 2010, it joined the newly created Arrondissement administratif Jura bernois.

== Coat of arms ==
The blazon of the municipal coat of arms is Or a Cauldron Sable. The cauldron refers to the local pitch industry which has largely vanished.

== Demographics ==
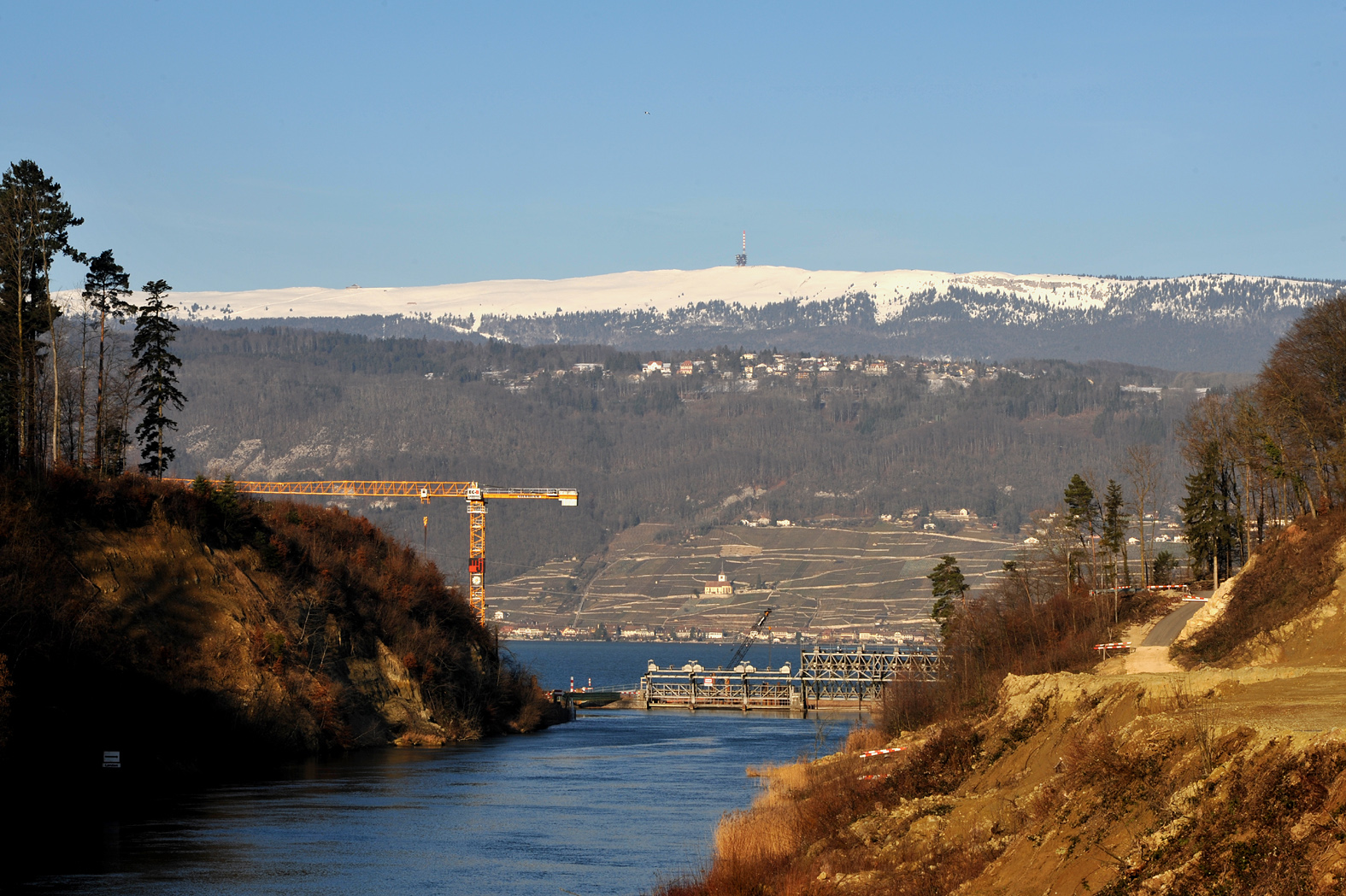
The Hagneck canal of the Aare river. The village Prêles is visible on the hill above the river and below the Chasseral peak.

Prêles had a population (as of 2011) of 908. As of 2010, 8.8% of the population are resident foreign nationals. Over the last 10 years (2001-2011) the population has changed at a rate of 0.1%. Migration accounted for 0.1%, while births and deaths accounted for 0.6%.

Most of the population (as of 2000) speaks French (580 or 65.5%) as their first language, German is the second most common (270 or 30.5%) and Italian is the third (8 or 0.9%).

As of 2008, the population was 49.6% male and 50.4% female. The population was made up of 409 Swiss men (45.1% of the population) and 41 (4.5%) non-Swiss men. There were 418 Swiss women (46.1%) and 39 (4.3%) non-Swiss women. Of the population in the municipality, 214 or about 24.2% were born in Prêles and lived there in 2000. There were 317 or 35.8% who were born in the same canton, while 219 or 24.7% were born somewhere else in Switzerland, and 104 or 11.7% were born outside of Switzerland.

As of 2011, children and teenagers (0–19 years old) make up 22.2% of the population, while adults (20–64 years old) make up 56.8% and seniors (over 64 years old) make up 20.9%.

As of 2000, there were 359 people who were single and never married in the municipality. There were 440 married individuals, 50 widows or widowers and 37 individuals who are divorced.

As of 2010, there were 85 households that consist of only one person and 24 households with five or more people. In 2000, a total of 320 apartments (80.8% of the total) were permanently occupied, while 58 apartments (14.6%) were seasonally occupied and 18 apartments (4.5%) were empty. As of 2010, the construction rate of new housing units was 7.7 new units per 1000 residents. The vacancy rate for the municipality, in 2012, was 1.35%.

The historical population is given in the following chart:

== Politics ==
In the 2011 federal election the most popular party was the Social Democratic Party (SP) which received 27% of the vote. The next three most popular parties were the Swiss People's Party (SVP) (23.7%), the Green Party (14.3%) and the FDP.The Liberals (11.6%). In the federal election, a total of 268 votes were cast, and the voter turnout was 39.4%.

== Economy ==
As of 2011, Prêles had an unemployment rate of 1.67%. As of 2008, there were a total of 242 people employed in the municipality. Of these, there were 43 people employed in the primary economic sector and about 9 businesses involved in this sector. 30 people were employed in the secondary sector and there were 3 businesses in this sector. 169 people were employed in the tertiary sector, with 22 businesses in this sector. There were 415 residents of the municipality who were employed in some capacity, of which females made up 38.6% of the workforce.

In 2008 there were a total of 176 full-time equivalent jobs. The number of jobs in the primary sector was 21, all of which were in agriculture. The number of jobs in the secondary sector was 29 of which 19 or (65.5%) were in manufacturing and 10 (34.5%) were in construction. The number of jobs in the tertiary sector was 126. In the tertiary sector; 5 or 4.0% were in wholesale or retail sales or the repair of motor vehicles, 3 or 2.4% were in the movement and storage of goods, 8 or 6.3% were in a hotel or restaurant, 12 or 9.5% were technical professionals or scientists, and 6 or 4.8% were in health care.

In 2000, there were 92 workers who commuted into the municipality and 285 workers who commuted away. The municipality is a net exporter of workers, with about 3.1 workers leaving the municipality for every one entering. A total of 130 workers (58.6% of the 222 total workers in the municipality) both lived and worked in Prêles.

Of the working population, 6.3% used public transportation to get to work, and 73.3% used a private car.

In 2011 the average local and cantonal tax rate on a married resident of Prêles making 150,000 CHF was 13%, while an unmarried resident's rate was 19.2%. For comparison, the average rate for the entire canton in 2006 was 13.9% and the nationwide rate was 11.6%. In 2009 there were a total of 362 tax payers in the municipality. Of that total, 143 made over 75 thousand CHF per year. There was one person who made between 15 and 20 thousand per year. The average income of the over 75,000 CHF group in Prêles was 120,221 CHF, while the average across all of Switzerland was 130,478 CHF.

Vinifuni Ligerz–Prêles, a funicular, links to Ligerz railway station.

== Religion ==
From the 2000 census, 509 or 57.4% belonged to the Swiss Reformed Church, while 159 or 17.9% were Roman Catholic. Of the rest of the population, there were 5 members of an Orthodox church (or about 0.56% of the population), and there were 97 individuals (or about 10.95% of the population) who belonged to another Christian church. There were 11 (or about 1.24% of the population) who were Islamic. There was 1 person who was Hindu. 117 (or about 13.21% of the population) belonged to no church, are agnostic or atheist, and 35 individuals (or about 3.95% of the population) did not answer the question.

== Education ==
In Prêles about 51% of the population have completed non-mandatory upper secondary education, and 28.3% have completed additional higher education (either university or a Fachhochschule). Of the 149 who had completed some form of tertiary schooling listed in the census, 69.8% were Swiss men, 26.2% were Swiss women.

The Canton of Bern school system provides one year of non-obligatory Kindergarten, followed by six years of Primary school. This is followed by three years of obligatory lower Secondary school where the students are separated according to ability and aptitude. Following the lower Secondary students may attend additional schooling or they may enter an apprenticeship.

During the 2011-12 school year, there were a total of 30 students attending classes in Prêles. There were no kindergarten classes in the municipality. The municipality had 2 primary classes and 30 students. Of the primary students, 10.0% were permanent or temporary residents of Switzerland (not citizens) and 6.7% have a different mother language than the classroom language.

As of 2000, there were a total of 58 students attending any school in the municipality. Of those, 41 both lived and attended school in the municipality, while 17 students came from another municipality. During the same year, 128 residents attended schools outside the municipality.
