= Lamboing =

- Former municipality
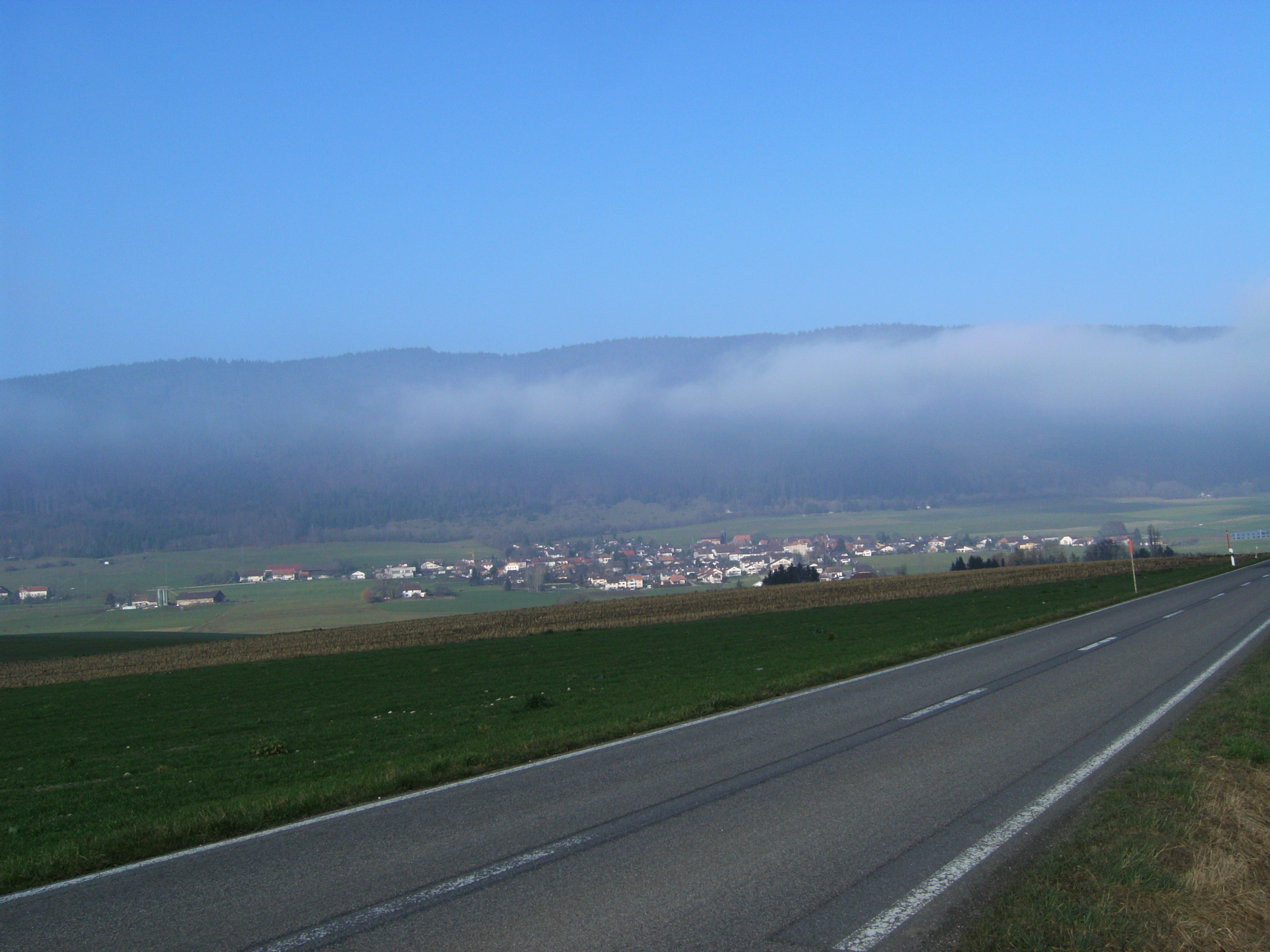
- Lamboing village and surrounding fields

- Flag Coat of arms
- Location of Lamboing
- Location within Switzerland Location within Canton of Bern
- Coordinates: 47°7′N 7°9′E
- Country: Switzerland
- Canton: Bern
- District: Jura bernois

Area
  - Total: 9.1 km^{2} (3.5 sq mi)
- Elevation: 820 m (2,690 ft)

Population (Dec 2011)
  - Total: 680
  - Density: 75/km^{2} (190/sq mi)
- Time zone: UTC+01:00 (CET)
  - Summer (DST): UTC+02:00 (CEST)
- Postal code: 2516
- SFOS number: 722
- ISO 3166 code: CH-BE
- Surrounded by: Nods, Diesse, Prêles, Twann, Tüscherz-Alfermée, Evilard, Orvin
- Website: www.lamboing.ch

Lamboing (French pronunciation: [lɑ̃bwˈɛ̃]) is a municipality in the Jura bernois administrative district in the canton of Bern in Switzerland, located in the French-speaking Bernese Jura (Jura Bernois).

The proposed merger of the municipalities of Diesse, Lamboing, Nods and Prêles into the new municipality of Le Plateau de Diesse was rejected by voters. However, on 1 January 2014 the former municipalities of Lamboing, Diesse and Prêles merged into the new municipality of Plateau de Diesse.

== History ==
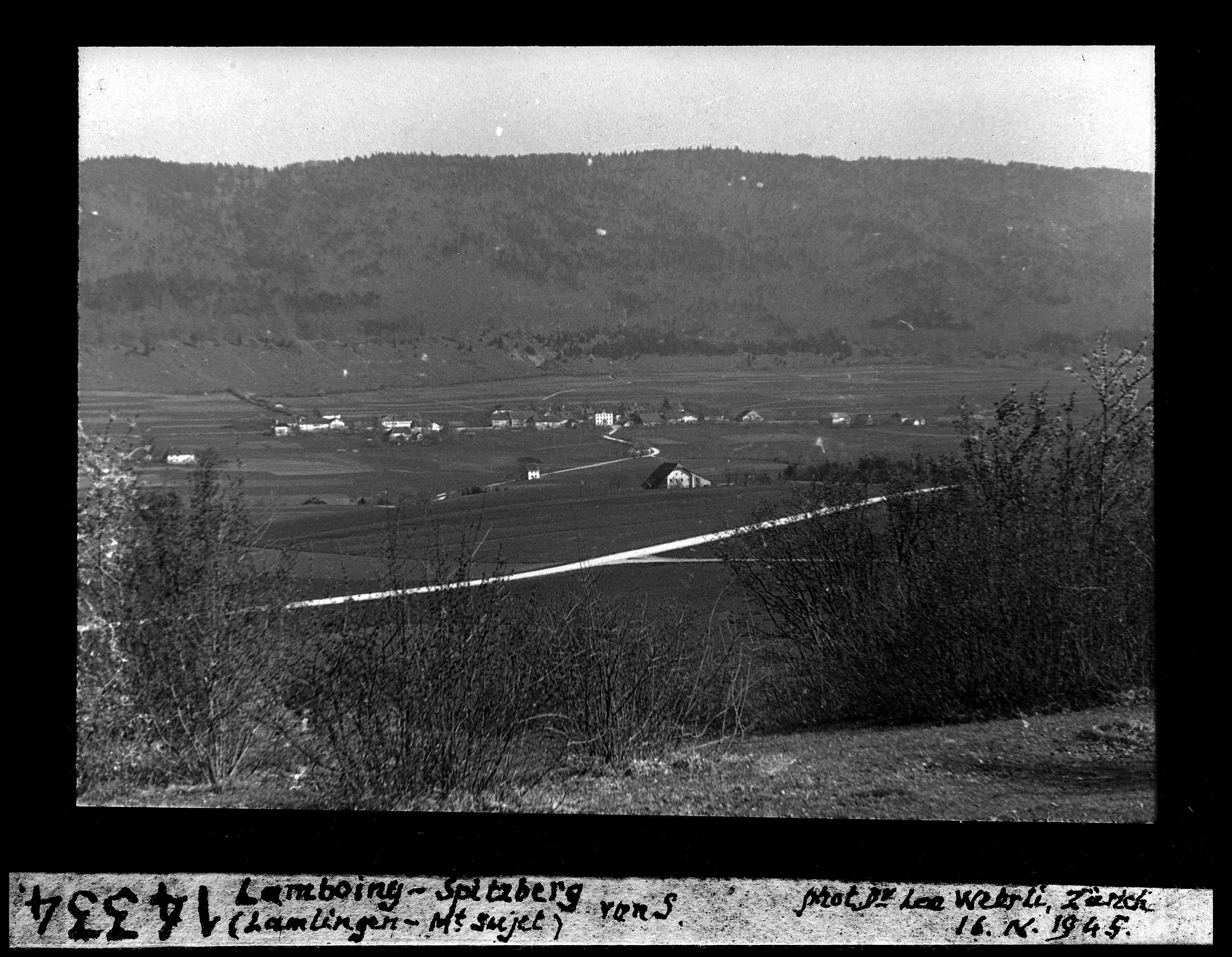
View with Mt. Sujet by Leo Wehrli (1945)

Lamboing is first mentioned in 1179 as Lamboens though this document is thought to be a forgery from the late 12th Century. In 1235 it was mentioned as Lamboens.

The noble de Lamboing family was first mentioned in a document from 1255. But very little is known about this family. In 1423 the de Vaumarcus family were given the village as a fief, which they held until 1509. In that year the village was acquired by the Prince-Bishopric of Basel who ruled over the village for almost three centuries. After the 1798 French invasion, Lamboing became part of the French Département of Mont-Terrible. Three years later, in 1800 it became part of the Département of Haut-Rhin. After Napoleon's defeat and the Congress of Vienna, Lamboing was assigned to the Canton of Bern in 1815. A village school house was built in 1863. During the late 19th century a watchmaker's workshop opened in the village. It was acquired by the Ebauches SA company in 1926 and continued making components for watches until 1981. Beginning in the 1970s the village's population began to grow as commuters settled in Lamboing.

It has always been part of the parish of Diesse. When Diesse converted to the new faith of the Protestant Reformation between 1530 and 1554, Lamboing converted as well.

== Geography ==
Before the merger, Lamboing had a total area of 9.1 km^{2} (3.5 mi^{2}). As of 2012, a total of 3.56 km^{2} (1.37 mi^{2}) or 39.1% is used for agricultural purposes, while 4.93 km^{2} (1.90 mi^{2}) or 54.1% is forested. Of the rest of the land, 0.61 km^{2} (0.24 mi^{2}) or 6.7% is settled (buildings or roads).

During the same year, housing and buildings made up 3.2% and transportation infrastructure made up 2.9%. Out of the forested land, 50.5% of the total land area is heavily forested and 3.6% is covered with orchards or small clusters of trees. Of the agricultural land, 19.3% is used for growing crops and 9.9% is pastures and 9.1% is used for alpine pastures.

The former municipality is located on the Plateau de Diesse. It consists of the village of Lamboing and the hamlets of Les Moulins, Derrière-la-Chaux and Magglingen.

On 31 December 2009 District de la Neuveville, the municipality's former district, was dissolved. On the following day, 1 January 2010, it joined the newly created Arrondissement administratif Jura bernois.

== Coat of arms ==
The blazon of the municipal coat of arms is Azure a Chevron embowed between three Crosses Couped Argent and a Mount of 3 Coupeaux of the same.

== Demographics ==
Lamboing had a population (as of 2011) of 680. As of 2010, 5.8% of the population are resident foreign nationals. Over the last 10 years (2001-2011) the population has changed at a rate of 0.9%. Migration accounted for 0.4%, while births and deaths accounted for 0.4%.

Most of the population (as of 2000) speaks French (545 or 84.2%) as their first language, German is the second most common (80 or 12.4%) and Portuguese is the third (6 or 0.9%). There are 4 people who speak Italian and 2 people who speak Romansh.

As of 2008, the population was 49.7% male and 50.3% female. The population was made up of 320 Swiss men (47.5% of the population) and 15 (2.2%) non-Swiss men. There were 315 Swiss women (46.7%) and 24 (3.6%) non-Swiss women. Of the population in the municipality, 226 or about 34.9% were born in Lamboing and lived there in 2000. There were 208 or 32.1% who were born in the same canton, while 145 or 22.4% were born somewhere else in Switzerland, and 48 or 7.4% were born outside of Switzerland.

As of 2011, children and teenagers (0–19 years old) make up 21.6% of the population, while adults (20–64 years old) make up 60.4% and seniors (over 64 years old) make up 17.9%.

As of 2000, there were 260 people who were single and never married in the municipality. There were 327 married individuals, 34 widows or widowers and 26 individuals who are divorced.

As of 2010, there were 88 households that consist of only one person and 17 households with five or more people. In 2000, a total of 251 apartments (76.3% of the total) were permanently occupied, while 66 apartments (20.1%) were seasonally occupied and 12 apartments (3.6%) were empty. As of 2010, the construction rate of new housing units was 1.5 new units per 1000 residents.

The historical population is given in the following chart:

== Politics ==
In the 2011 federal election the most popular party was the Social Democratic Party (SP) which received 26.4% of the vote. The next two most popular parties were the Swiss People's Party (SVP) (26.2%), and the FDP.The Liberals (15.5%) . In the federal election, a total of 193 votes were cast, and the voter turnout was 37.0%.

== Economy ==
As of 2011, Lamboing had an unemployment rate of 2.2%. As of 2008, there were a total of 109 people employed in the municipality. Of these, there were 31 people employed in the primary economic sector and about 12 businesses involved in this sector. 26 people were employed in the secondary sector and there were 6 businesses in this sector. 52 people were employed in the tertiary sector, with 13 businesses in this sector. There were 335 residents of the municipality who were employed in some capacity, of which females made up 43.3% of the workforce.

In 2008 there were a total of 86 full-time equivalent jobs. The number of jobs in the primary sector was 21, of which 19 were in agriculture and 2 were in forestry or lumber production. The number of jobs in the secondary sector was 23 of which 9 or (39.1%) were in manufacturing and 14 (60.9%) were in construction. The number of jobs in the tertiary sector was 42. In the tertiary sector; 22 or 52.4% were in wholesale or retail sales or the repair of motor vehicles, 8 or 19.0% were in the movement and storage of goods, 6 or 14.3% were in a hotel or restaurant, and 3 or 7.1% were technical professionals or scientists.

In 2000, there were 42 workers who commuted into the municipality and 246 workers who commuted away. The municipality is a net exporter of workers, with about 5.9 workers leaving the municipality for every one entering. A total of 89 workers (67.9% of the 131 total workers in the municipality) both lived and worked in Lamboing. Of the working population, 4.8% used public transportation to get to work, and 71.9% used a private car.

In 2011 the average local and cantonal tax rate on a married resident of Lamboing making 150,000 CHF was 13.3%, while an unmarried resident's rate was 19.5%. For comparison, the average rate for the entire canton in 2006 was 13.9% and the nationwide rate was 11.6%. In 2009 there were a total of 294 tax payers in the municipality. Of that total, 93 made over 75 thousand CHF per year. There were 4 people who made between 15 and 20 thousand per year. The greatest number of workers, 99, made between 50 and 75 thousand CHF per year. The average income of the over 75,000 CHF group in Lamboing was 110,018 CHF, while the average across all of Switzerland was 130,478 CHF.

== Religion ==
From the 2000 census, 394 or 60.9% belonged to the Swiss Reformed Church, while 121 or 18.7% were Roman Catholic. Of the rest of the population, there were 2 members of an Orthodox church (or about 0.31% of the population), there was 1 individual who belongs to the Christian Catholic Church, and there were 18 individuals (or about 2.78% of the population) who belonged to another Christian church. There were 2 (or about 0.31% of the population) who were Islamic. 87 (or about 13.45% of the population) belonged to no church, are agnostic or atheist, and 31 individuals (or about 4.79% of the population) did not answer the question.

== Education ==
In Lamboing about 55.7% of the population have completed non-mandatory upper secondary education, and 14.6% have completed additional higher education (either university or a Fachhochschule). Of the 58 who had completed some form of tertiary schooling listed in the census, 69.0% were Swiss men, 22.4% were Swiss women.

The Canton of Bern school system provides one year of non-obligatory Kindergarten, followed by six years of Primary school. This is followed by three years of obligatory lower Secondary school where the students are separated according to ability and aptitude. Following the lower Secondary students may attend additional schooling or they may enter an apprenticeship.

During the 2011-12 school year, there were a total of 62 students attending classes in Lamboing. There was one kindergarten class with a total of 24 students in the municipality. Of the kindergarten students, 4.2% were permanent or temporary residents of Switzerland (not citizens) and 4.2% have a different mother language than the classroom language. The municipality had 3 primary classes and 38 students. Of the primary students, 7.9% were permanent or temporary residents of Switzerland (not citizens) and 7.9% have a different mother language than the classroom language.

As of 2000, there were a total of 64 students attending any school in the municipality. Of those, 29 both lived and attended school in the municipality while 35 students came from another municipality. During the same year, 92 residents attended schools outside the municipality.
