= Twann =

- Former municipality
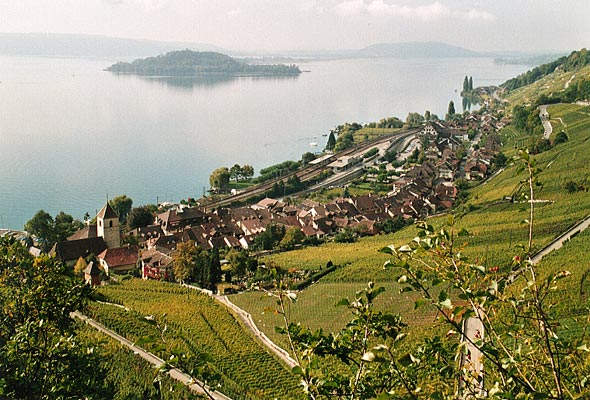
- Lake Biel, St. Petersinsel and Twann

- Flag Coat of arms
- Location of Twann
- Location within Switzerland Location within Canton of Bern
- Coordinates: 47°5′N 7°9′E
- Country: Switzerland
- Canton: Bern
- District: Nidau

Area
  - Total: 9.1 km^{2} (3.5 sq mi)
- Elevation: 434 m (1,424 ft)

Population (December 2007)
  - Total: 818
  - Density: 90/km^{2} (230/sq mi)
- Time zone: UTC+01:00 (CET)
  - Summer (DST): UTC+02:00 (CEST)
- Postal code: 2513
- SFOS number: 753
- ISO 3166 code: CH-BE
- Surrounded by: Erlach, Hagneck, Lamboing, La Neuveville, Ligerz, Lüscherz, Mörigen, Prêles, Sutz-Lattrigen, Täuffelen, Tüscherz-Alfermée, Vinelz
- Website: SFSO statistics

Twann (French: Douanne [dwan]) was a municipality in the district of Nidau in the canton of Bern in Switzerland. On 1 January 2010 the municipalities of Tüscherz-Alfermée and Twann merged into the municipality of Twann-Tüscherz.

== History ==
Twann is first mentioned in 1185 as Duana. In 1225 it was mentioned as Tuanna.

Just outside the Twann train station is a large and well preserved neolithic lakeside settlement. It was discovered in the mid 19th century and in 1974-76 about 10% of the total site was excavated. Almost 20 different village existed at the site between 3838 and 2976 BC. The longest a single village was inhabited was only 24 years. The small huts (7 m × 4 m [23 ft × 13 ft]) were only temporary and most had to be repaired after less than four years and replaced after sixteen. The huts stood in serried ranks either longitudinally or transversely oriented to the lake. The hut floors had a layer of peat to keep them dry and a clay hearth in the center. The residents used hoes, sticks and simple plows to raise grain which was eaten as a porridge or bread. They raised domestic cattle, sheep and goats constantly and hunted animals, mostly red deer, as needed. They often fished in the lake. They wore clothes made of woven flax and bark fibers. An incised ceramic vessel shows trade links to Valais and a rock crystal shows that they traded with other alpine villages. About half of their flint tools came from local flint sources, while the rest of the flint from distant regions including southern Germany, the southern Rhone Valley and Champagne. One copper knife blade was also discovered at the site.

The other prehistoric sites include a Roman cremation grave in Rogget, early medieval finds in Gaicht and a burial ground in Gauchete.

The settlement of Rogget northeast of Wingreis was first mentioned in 1235. During the 14th century it was abandoned, probably due to a massive rock slide.

During the Middle Ages Twann was the capital of the Herrschaft of the Lords of Twann. In 1250, however, their line died out and it was inherited by the Baron de Diesse. Shortly thereafter it went to the Vaumarcus family and then the Bolligen family. The Bolligens held Twann until 1422 when they sold it to the Bernese Schultheiss Rudolf Hofmeister. He established it as a Twingrecht or lower jurisdiction with a judge in 1426. Rights over parts of the village were held by a number of different nobles, but by 1470 the right to hold a court in Twann was split between Bern and the Prince-Bishopric of Basel.

The village church of St. Martin was first mentioned in 1228 and belonged to the diocese of Lausanne. The first church was built in the 9th or 10th century. This building was replaced in the 13th century and again in the 15th century. The current appearance of the church comes from Abraham Dünz the Elder's renovation in 1666-67. In 1237 Kuno von Twann gave the right to appoint the village priest to the Münchenbuchsee Commandery. During the Reformation, the Commandery was dissolved and in 1528 control over the church went to Bern.

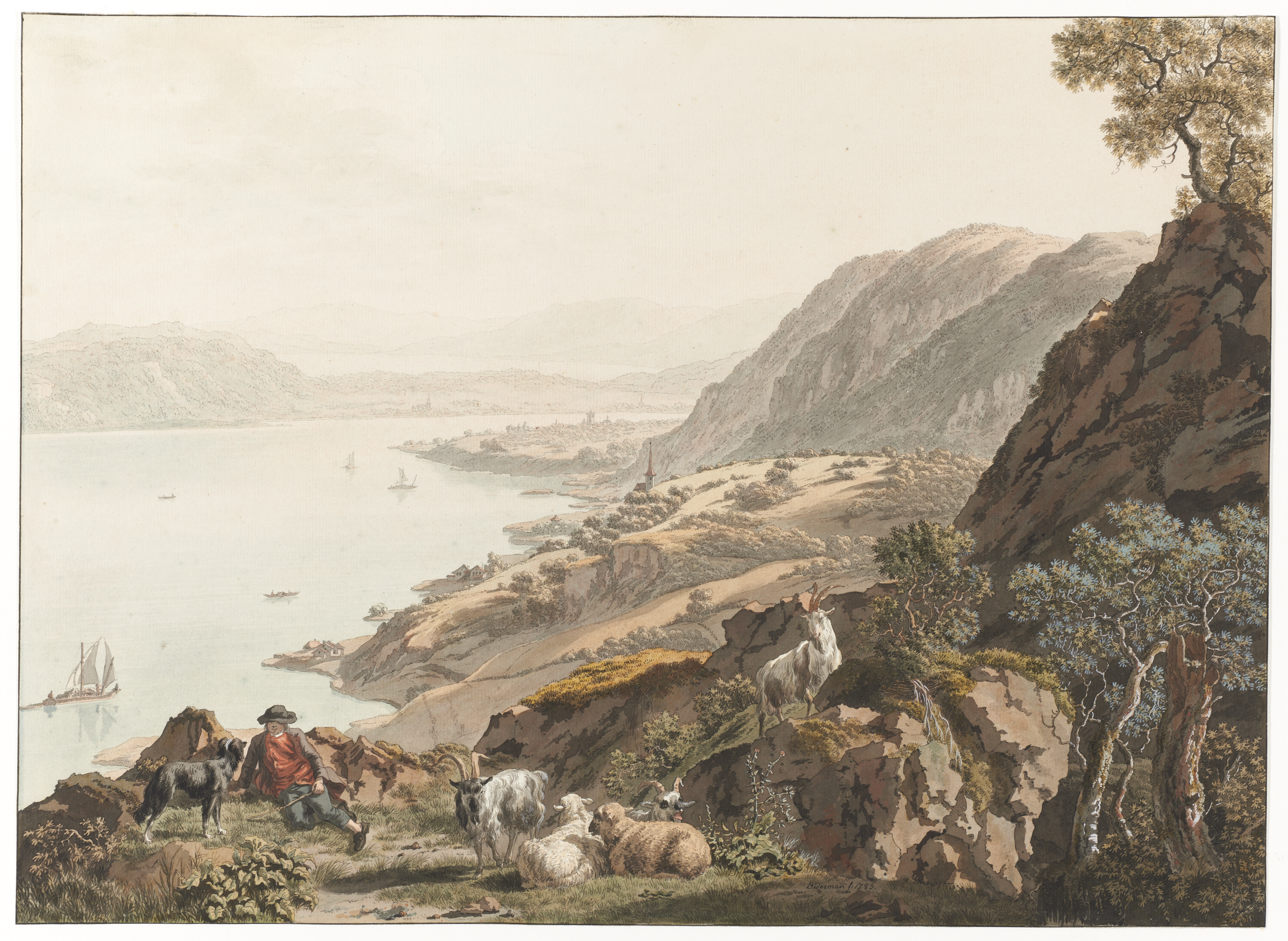
Watercolor depicting Twann and Lake Biel by Johann Jakob Biedermann, 1785, from the archives of the Swiss National Library

The local economy was based on viticulture, fishing and animal husbandry. Weekly markets allowed the residents to buy any grain that they needed. Many of the vineyards were owned by Bernese nobles or by Engelberg Abbey, Münchenbuchsee Commandery and Fraubrunnen Abbey. After the Reformation, the monastery vineyards were acquired by Bern and leased out to local farmers. In Wingreis, the Rebhaus Thormanngut, a vineyard manor house, was built in the 16th century for Bernese patricians.

For most of the history of Twann, the main transportation mode was by ship. The first road that connected Twann to Biel was built in 1835-38. About twenty years later it was followed by the Biel-Neuchatel railway line in 1858-60. The expansion of the railway and the highway, in 1969-78, separated the village completely from the lake. While viticulture is still important to the village, tourism, a shipyard and a construction company are also important parts of the local economy. In 1977-80 a vacation village was built on the Twannberg. It was sold and converted into a hotel in 2009.

== Geography ==
Twann has an area of 9.1 km^{2} (3.5 sq mi). Of this area, 29.3% is used for agricultural purposes, while 60% is forested. Of the rest of the land, 6.9% is settled (buildings or roads) and the remainder (3.9%) is non-productive (rivers, glaciers or mountains).

== Demographics ==
year	population
1764	464
1850	865
1880	976
1900	854
1941	735
1950	886

Twann has a population (as of 2007) of 818, of which 9.2% are foreign nationals. Over the last 10 years the population has decreased at a rate of -0.4%. Most of the population (as of 2000) speaks German (86.9%), with French being second most common ( 6.0%) and Portuguese being third ( 1.7%).

In the 2007 election the most popular party was the SVP which received 31.9% of the vote. The next three most popular parties were the FDP (23.5%), the SPS (20.6%) and the Green Party (16.8%).

The age distribution of the population (as of 2000) is children and teenagers (0–19 years old) make up 22.4% of the population, while adults (20–64 years old) make up 62.1% and seniors (over 64 years old) make up 15.5%. The entire Swiss population is generally well educated. In Twann about 80.5% of the population (between age 25-64) have completed either non-mandatory upper secondary education or additional higher education (either University or a Fachhochschule).

Twann has an unemployment rate of 0.87%. As of 2005, there were 125 people employed in the primary economic sector and about 46 businesses involved in this sector. 36 people are employed in the secondary sector and there are 14 businesses in this sector. 244 people are employed in the tertiary sector, with 32 businesses in this sector.
