= Diesse =

- Former municipality
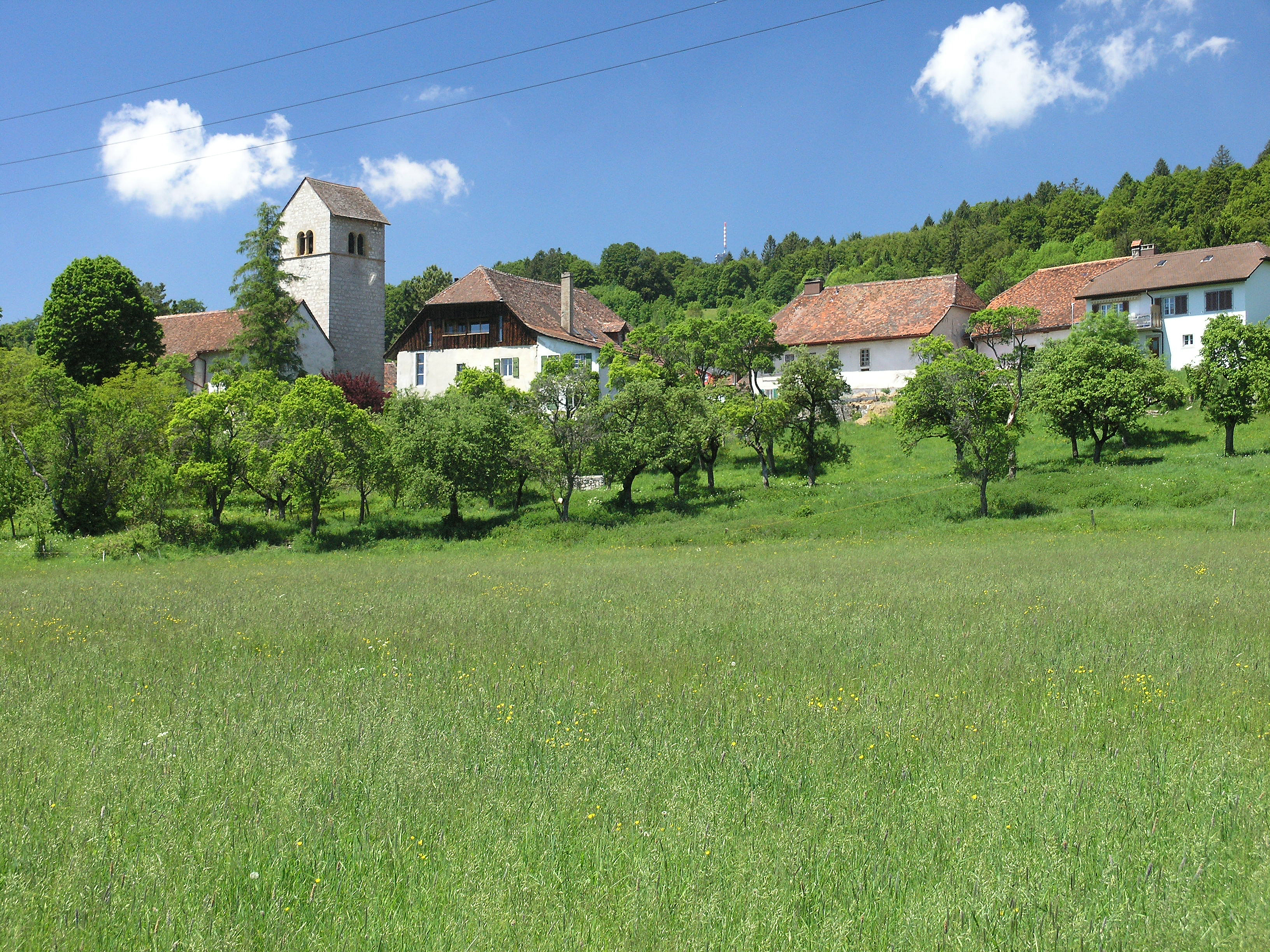
- View from the Chasseral toward Diesse village and Nods

- Flag Coat of arms
- Location of Diesse
- Location within Switzerland Location within Canton of Bern
- Coordinates: 47°7′N 7°7′E
- Country: Switzerland
- Canton: Bern
- District: Jura bernois

Area
  - Total: 9.48 km^{2} (3.66 sq mi)
- Elevation: 838 m (2,749 ft)

Population (Dec 2011)
  - Total: 436
  - Density: 46.0/km^{2} (119/sq mi)
- Time zone: UTC+01:00 (CET)
  - Summer (DST): UTC+02:00 (CEST)
- Postal code: 2517
- SFOS number: 721
- ISO 3166 code: CH-BE
- Surrounded by: Prêles, Lamboing, Nods
- Website: www.diesse.ch

Diesse (French pronunciation: [djɛs]) is a former municipality in the Jura bernois administrative district in the canton of Bern in Switzerland, located in the French-speaking Bernese Jura (Jura Bernois).

The proposed merger of the municipalities of Diesse, Lamboing, Nods, and Prêles into the new municipality of Le Plateau de Diesse was rejected by voters. However, on 1 January 2014 the former municipalities of Diesse, Lamboing, and Prêles merged into the new municipality of Plateau de Diesse.

== History ==
Diesse is first mentioned in 1178 as Diesse. In German it was known as Tess though this name is no longer commonly used.

The parish church of Diesse was first mentioned in 1185. Beginning in 1530 the Protestant Reformation gradually gained power until the parish switched to the new faith in 1554. Until 1798, Diesse was the capital of the district of Tessenberg. Following the 1798 French invasion, Diesse became part of France and remained so until the Congress of Vienna returned it to Bern. The village school was built in 1850-56. The village's population slowly declined until the 1980s, when commuters to the surrounding towns began to move into Diesse.

== Geography ==
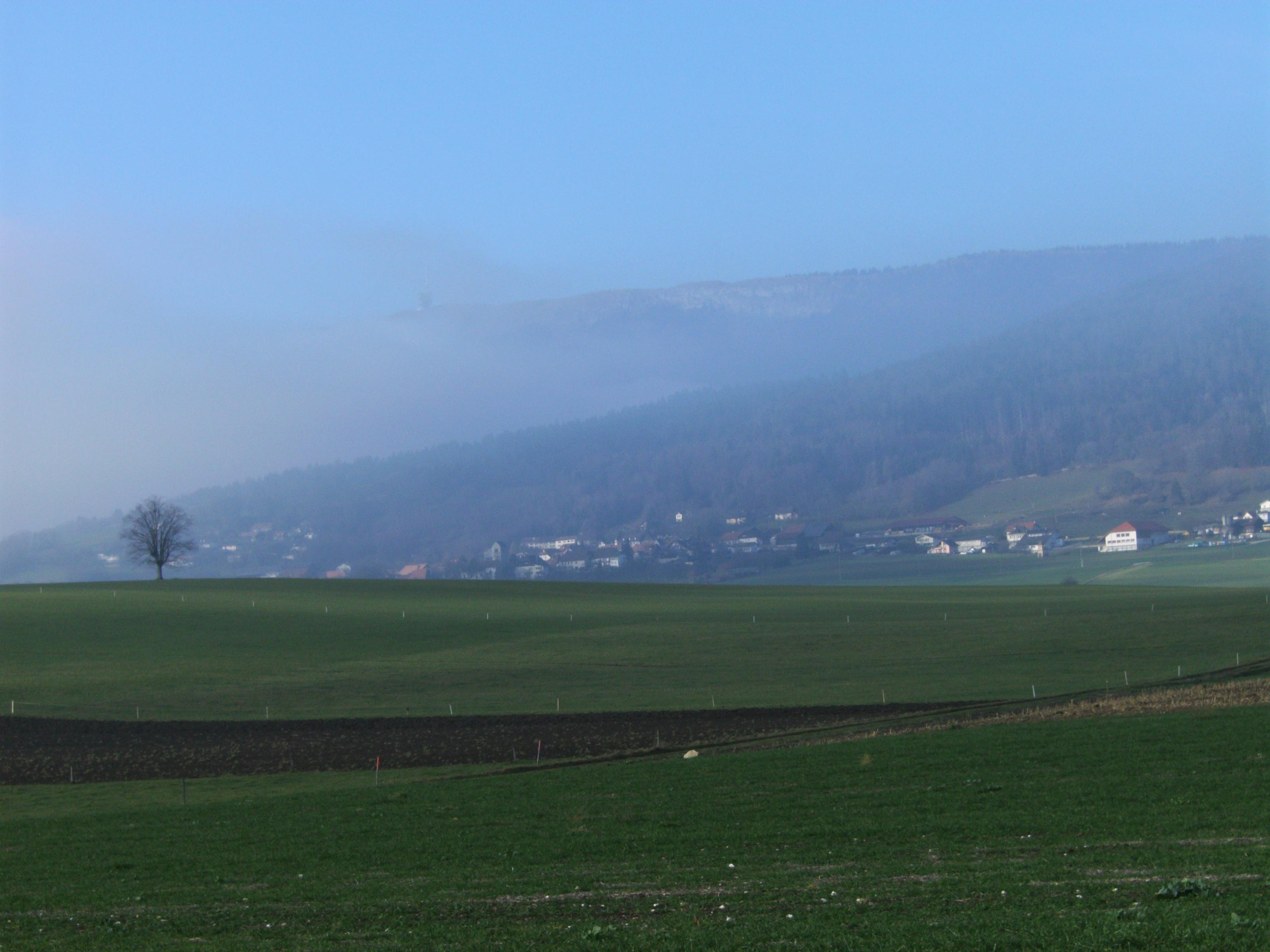
Fields and fog around the village of Diesse

Aerial view (1949)

Before the merger, Diesse had a total area of 9.5 km^{2} (3.7 mi^{2}). As of 2012, a total of 4.54 km^{2} (1.75 mi^{2}) or 47.9% is used for agricultural purposes, while 4.47 km^{2} (1.73 mi^{2}) or 47.2% is forested. Of the rest of the land, 0.43 km^{2} (0.17 mi^{2}) or 4.5% is settled (buildings or roads), and 0.01 km^{2} (2.5 acres) or 0.1% is unproductive land.

During the same year, housing and buildings made up 1.5%, and transportation infrastructure made up 2.3%. Out of the forested land, 43.0% of the total land area is heavily forested, and 4.1% is covered with orchards or small clusters of trees. Of the agricultural land, 21.9% is used for growing crops, 10.5% is pastureland, and 15.2% is used for alpine pasture.

The former municipality is located on the plateau de Diesse.

On 31 December 2009 District de la Neuveville, the municipality's former district, was dissolved. On the following day, 1 January 2010, it joined the newly created Arrondissement administratif Jura bernois.

== Coat of arms ==
The blazon of the municipal coat of arms is Gules five Linden leaves of the same on a Saltire Argent.

== Demographics ==
As of 2011 Diesse had a population of 436. As of 2010, 9.0% of the population were resident foreign nationals. Over the past ten years (2001-2011) the population has changed at a rate of -1.8%. Migration accounted for -2.9%, while births and deaths accounted for 0.9%.

Most of the population (as of 2000) speaks French (370 or 88.3%) as their first language, German is the second most common (40 or 9.5%), and Spanish is the third (5 or 1.2%).

As of 2008, the population was 48.6% male and 51.4% female. The population was made up of 196 Swiss men (44.1% of the population) and 20 (4.5%) non-Swiss men. There were 208 Swiss women (46.8%) and 20 (4.5%) non-Swiss women. Of the population in the municipality 136, or about 32.5%, were born in Diesse and lived there in 2000. There were 153, or 36.5%, who were born in the same canton, while 78, or 18.6%, were born elsewhere in Switzerland and 30, or 7.2%, were born outside of Switzerland.

As of 2011, children and teenagers (0–19 years old) make up 22% of the population, while adults (20–64 years old) make up 63.8% and seniors (over 64 years old) make up 14.2%.

As of 2000, there were 169 people who were single and never married in the municipality. There were 207 married individuals, 24 widows or widowers and 19 individuals who are divorced.

As of 2010, there were 53 households that consisted of only one person and 11 households with five or more people. In 2000, a total of 157 apartments (87.2% of the total) were permanently occupied, while 14 apartments (7.8%) were seasonally occupied and nine apartments (5.0%) were empty. As of 2010, the construction rate of new housing units was 6.8 new units per 1000 residents. The vacancy rate for the municipality, in 2011, was 0.94%.

The historical population is given in the following chart:

== Sights ==
The entire village of Diesse is designated as part of the Inventory of Swiss Heritage Sites.

== Politics ==
In the 2011 federal election the most popular party was the Green Party, which received 24.9% of the vote. The next three most popular parties were the Swiss People's Party (SVP) (21.7%), the Social Democratic Party (SP) (17.7%), and the FDP.The Liberals (11.4%). In the federal election, a total of 132 votes were cast, and the voter turnout was 40.5%.

== Economy ==
As of 2011, Diesse had an unemployment rate of 2.32%. As of 2008, there were a total of 117 people employed in the municipality. Of these, there were 25 people employed in the primary economic sector and about 11 businesses involved in this sector. Twenty-eight people were employed in the secondary sector and there were nine businesses in this sector. Sixty-four people were employed in the tertiary sector, with 11 businesses in this sector. There were 207 residents of the municipality who were employed in some capacity, of which females made up 44.9% of the workforce.

In 2008 there were a total of 100 full-time equivalent jobs. The number of jobs in the primary sector was 23, of which 19 were in agriculture and three were in forestry or lumber production. The number of jobs in the secondary sector was 24, of which 12 were in manufacturing and 12 were in construction. The number of jobs in the tertiary sector was 53. In the tertiary sector 25, or 47.2%, were in wholesale or retail sales or the repair of motor vehicles, two, or 3.8% were in a hotel or restaurant, one was in the information industry, one was a technical professional or scientist, 19, or 35.8%, were in education.

In 2000, there were 57 workers who commuted into the municipality and 143 workers who commuted away. The municipality is a net exporter of workers, with about 2.5 workers leaving the municipality for every one entering. A total of 64 workers (52.9% of the 121 total workers in the municipality) both lived and worked in Diesse.

Of the working population, 4.8% used public transportation to get to work, and 69.6% used a private car.

In 2011 the average local and cantonal tax rate on a married resident of Diesse making 150,000 CHF was 13.3%, while an unmarried resident's rate was 19.5%. For comparison, the average rate for the entire canton in 2006 was 13.9%, and the nationwide rate was 11.6%. In 2009 there was a total of 186 taxpayers in the municipality. Of that total, 57 made over 75,000 CHF per year. There was one person who made between 15,000 and 20,000 per year. The average income of the over-75,000 CHF group in Diesse was 110,275 CHF, while the average across all of Switzerland was 130,478 CHF.

== Religion ==
From the 2000 census 276, or 65.9%, belonged to the Swiss Reformed Church while 58, or 13.8%, were Roman Catholic. Of the rest of the population, there was one member of an Orthodox church, and there were 30 individuals (or about 7.16% of the population) who belonged to another Christian church. Forty-five (or about 10.74% of the population) belonged to no church, are agnostic or atheist, and 24 individuals (or about 5.73% of the population) did not answer the question.

== Education ==
In Diesse about 56.6% of the population have completed non-mandatory upper secondary education, and 17.5% have completed additional higher education (either university or a Fachhochschule). Of the 42 who had completed some form of tertiary schooling listed in the census, 61.9% were Swiss men, and 28.6% were Swiss women.

The Canton of Bern school system provides one year of non-obligatory Kindergarten, followed by six years of Primary school. This is followed by three years of obligatory lower Secondary school where the students are separated according to ability and aptitude. Following the lower Secondary, students may attend additional schooling or they may enter an apprenticeship.

During the 2011-12 school year, there was a total of 86 students attending classes in Diesse. There were two kindergarten classes with a total of 32 students in the municipality. Of the kindergarten students, 6.3% were permanent or temporary residents of Switzerland (not citizens), and 3.1% had a different mother tongue than the classroom language. The municipality had three primary classes and 54 students. Of the primary students, 1.9% were permanent or temporary residents of Switzerland (not citizens) and 7.4% had a different mother tongue than the classroom language.

As of 2000, there was a total of 111 students attending any school in the municipality. Of those, 34 both lived and attended school in the municipality, while 77 students came from another municipality. During the same year, 51 residents attended schools outside the municipality.
