= Nods, Switzerland =

Nods
- Municipality
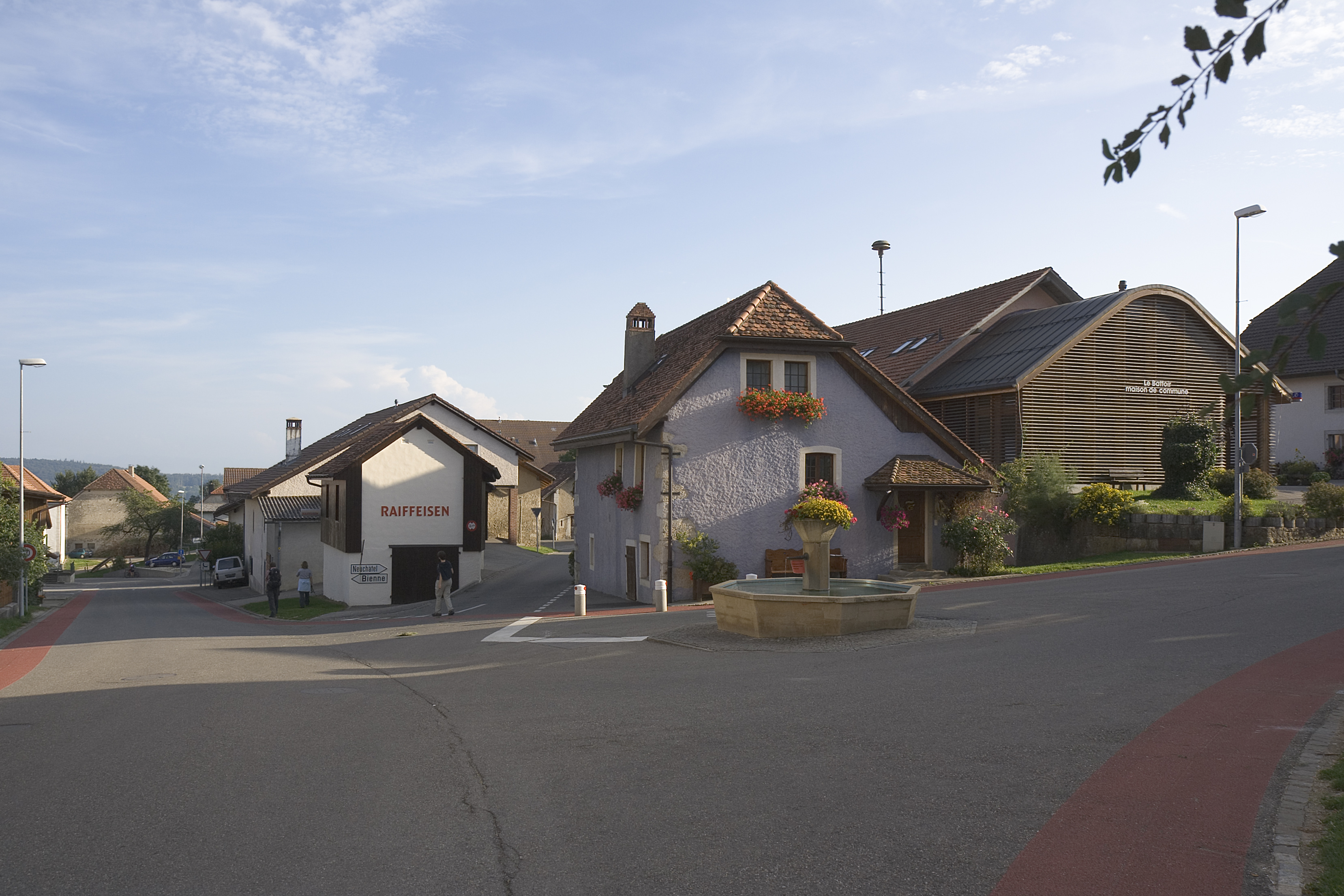
- Nods village square

- Flag Coat of arms
- Location of Nods
- Location within Switzerland Location within Canton of Bern
- Coordinates: 47°7′N 7°5′E
- Country: Switzerland
- Canton: Bern
- District: Jura bernois

Government
  - Mayor: Maire; Mary-Claude Bayard

Area
  - Total: 26.7 km^{2} (10.3 sq mi)
- Elevation: 885 m (2,904 ft)

Population (Dec 2011)
  - Total: 734
  - Density: 27.5/km^{2} (71.2/sq mi)
- Time zone: UTC+01:00 (CET)
  - Summer (DST): UTC+02:00 (CEST)
- Postal code: 2518
- SFOS number: 724
- ISO 3166 code: CH-BE
- Surrounded by: Plateau de Diesse, Orvin, Corgémont, Cortébert, Courtelary, Cormoret, Villeret, Val-de-Ruz (NE), Lignières (NE)
- Website: www.nods.ch

Nods (French pronunciation: [no]) is a municipality in the Jura bernois administrative district in the canton of Bern in Switzerland, located in the French-speaking Bernese Jura (Jura Bernois).

== History ==
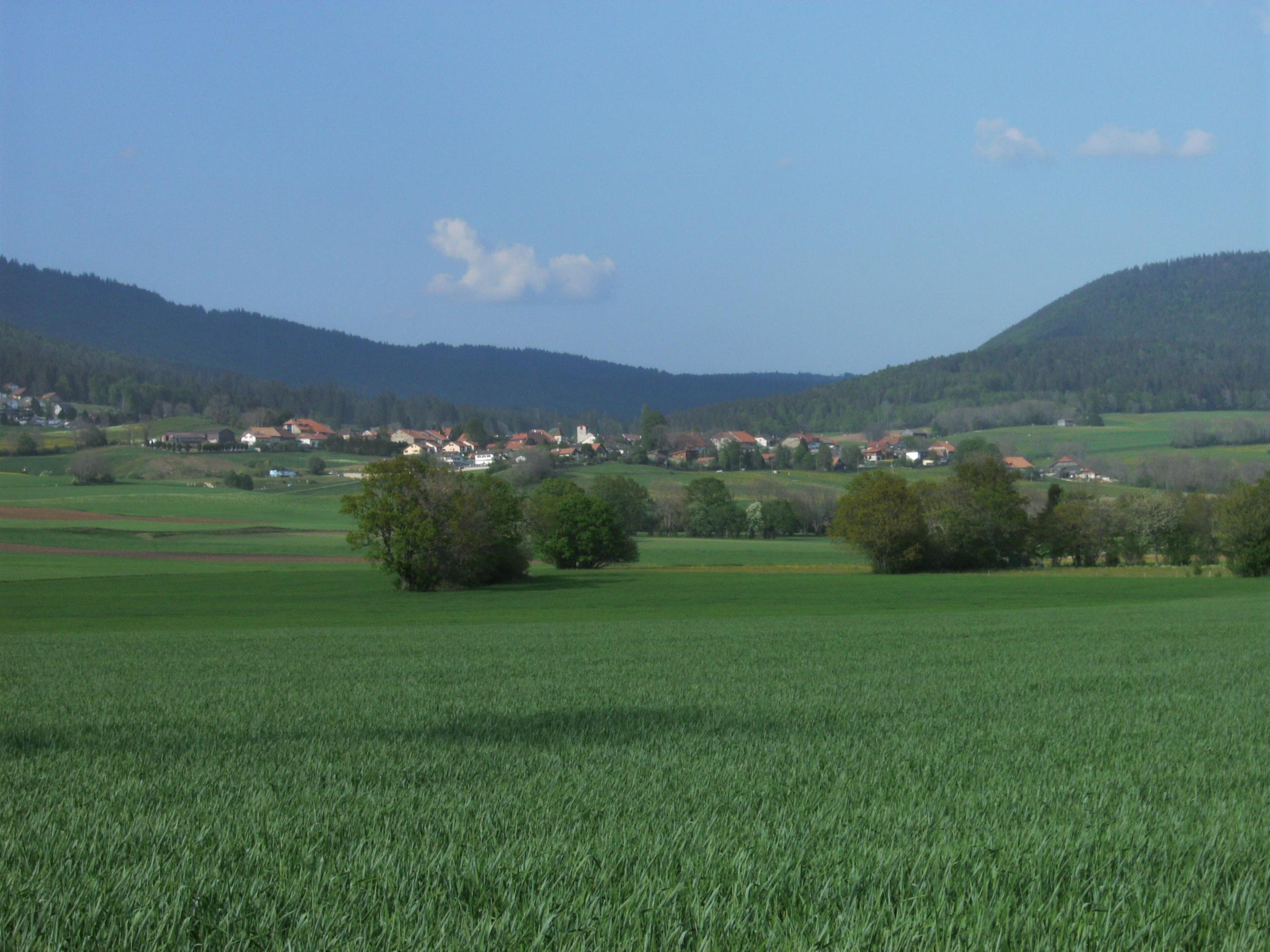
The fields outside Nods. The village is still generally rural and agrarian.

Nods is first mentioned in 1255 as Nos. The municipality was formerly known by its German name Nos, however, that name is no longer used.

The noble de Nods family first appears in the historical record in the thirteenth century and vanishes again in the fifteenth century. The village was located along the border between several competing powers. During the thirteenth century it was owned by the Counts of Neuchâtel, then by the city of Bern and then by the Bishop of Basel. It then remained under the authority of the Prince-Bishop for centuries. During the Protestant Reformation in the sixteenth century, preachers of the new faith came to convert the residents of Nods. However, they encountered serious resistance from the villagers. The village was finally converted after Bern forced the villagers to adopt the new faith. Those families that wished to remain Catholic were forced to move to Le Landeron and Cressier in Neuchâtel. Both before and after the Reformation, Nods was part of the parish of Diesse, until 1708 when it became an independent parish.

After the 1797 French victory and the Treaty of Campo Formio, Nods became part of the French Département of Mont-Terrible. Three years later, in 1800 it became part of the Département of Haut-Rhin. After Napoleon's defeat and the Congress of Vienna, it was assigned to the Canton of Bern in 1815. Initially part of the district of Erlach, in 1846 it transferred to the La Neuveville District.

The village church was built in 1639. The current building was built on the same site in 1835.

The village economy was traditionally based on agriculture, animal husbandry and cheese production. Beginning in 1963 a chair lift to the Chasseral peak provided a small tourism industry until it closed in 1993. In the 1970s a small machine shop provided about ten industrial jobs in the village. The new development of Bois-Châtel was built in the 1980s.

== Geography ==
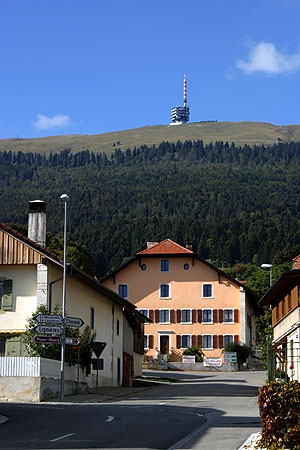
Nods village with the Chasseral peak in the background

Nods has an area of 26.61 km^{2} (10.27 sq mi). As of 2012, a total of 11.99 km^{2} (4.63 mi^{2}) or 45.0% is used for agricultural purposes, while 13.75 km^{2} (5.31 mi^{2}) or 51.6% is forested. Of the rest of the land, 0.8 km^{2} (0.31 mi^{2}) or 3.0% is settled (buildings or roads), 0.01 km^{2} (2.5 acres) or 0.0% is either rivers or lakes and 0.08 km^{2} (20 acres) or 0.3% is unproductive land.

During the same year, housing and buildings made up 1.4% and transportation infrastructure made up 1.4%. Out of the forested land, 47.4% of the total land area is heavily forested and 4.3% is covered with orchards or small clusters of trees. Of the agricultural land, 15.9% is used for growing crops and 11.6% is pastures and 17.4% is used for alpine pastures. All the water in the municipality is flowing water.

The municipality is located on the Plateau de Diesse at the foot of the Chasseral peak. It consists of the village of Nods and the hamlets of Les Combes and La Praye.

On 31 December 2009 District de la Neuveville, the municipality's former district, was dissolved. On the following day, 1 January 2010, it joined the newly created Arrondissement administratif Jura bernois.

== Coat of arms ==
The blazon of the municipal coat of arms is Or a Ploughshare Sable between two Plough-knives of the same all with points to the base.

== Demographics ==
Nods has a population (as of December 2020) of 788. As of 2010, 6.2% of the population are resident foreign nationals. Over the last ten years (2001-2011) the population has changed at a rate of -1.6%. Migration accounted for -0.9%, while births and deaths accounted for -0.4%.

Most of the population (as of 2000) speaks French (568 or 85.0%) as their first language, German is the second most common (82 or 12.3%) and Portuguese is the third (7 or 1.0%). There are three people who speak Italian.

As of 2008, the population was 53.1% male and 46.9% female. The population was made up of 368 Swiss men (49.3% of the population) and 28 (3.8%) non-Swiss men. There were 332 Swiss women (44.5%) and 18 (2.4%) non-Swiss women. Of the population in the municipality, 247 or about 37.0% were born in Nods and lived there in 2000. There were 208 or 31.1% who were born in the same canton, while 135 or 20.2% were born somewhere else in Switzerland, and 55 or 8.2% were born outside of Switzerland.

As of 2011, children and teenagers (0–19 years old) make up 26.3% of the population, while adults (20–64 years old) make up 57.4% and seniors (over 64 years old) make up 16.3%.

As of 2000, there were 272 people who were single and never married in the municipality. There were 320 married individuals, 29 widows or widowers and 47 individuals who are divorced.

As of 2010, there were 87 households that consist of only one person and 31 households with five or more people. In 2000, a total of 256 apartments (74.9% of the total) were permanently occupied, while 66 apartments (19.3%) were seasonally occupied and 20 apartments (5.8%) were empty. As of 2010, the construction rate of new housing units was 1.3 new units per 1000 residents. The vacancy rate for the municipality, in 2012, was 0.51%.

The historical population is given in the following chart:

== Sights ==
The entire village of Nods is designated as part of the Inventory of Swiss Heritage Sites.

== Politics ==
In the 2011 federal election the most popular party was the Swiss People's Party (SVP) which received 28.9% of the vote. The next three most popular parties were the Social Democratic Party (SP) (23.6%), the FDP.The Liberals (13.9%) and the Green Party (8.9%). In the federal election, a total of 190 votes were cast, and the voter turnout was 36.0%.

== Economy ==
As of 2011, Nods had an unemployment rate of 1.96%. As of 2008, there were a total of 140 people employed in the municipality. Of these, there were 58 people employed in the primary economic sector and about 25 businesses involved in this sector. 35 people were employed in the secondary sector and there were 7 businesses in this sector. 47 people were employed in the tertiary sector, with 17 businesses in this sector. There were 338 residents of the municipality who were employed in some capacity, of which females made up 43.2% of the workforce.

In 2008 there were a total of 111 full-time equivalent jobs. The number of jobs in the primary sector was 42, of which 39 were in agriculture and 3 were in forestry or lumber production. The number of jobs in the secondary sector was 29 of which 24 or (82.8%) were in manufacturing and 5 (17.2%) were in construction. The number of jobs in the tertiary sector was 40. In the tertiary sector; 8 or 20.0% were in wholesale or retail sales or the repair of motor vehicles, 7 or 17.5% were in the movement and storage of goods, 12 or 30.0% were in a hotel or restaurant, 1 was the insurance or financial industry, 3 or 7.5% were technical professionals or scientists, 2 or 5.0% were in education.

In 2000, there were 27 workers who commuted into the municipality and 222 workers who commuted away. The municipality is a net exporter of workers, with about 8.2 workers leaving the municipality for every one entering. A total of 116 workers (81.1% of the 143 total workers in the municipality) both lived and worked in Nods. Of the working population, 4.4% used public transportation to get to work, and 68.6% used a private car.

In 2011 the average local and cantonal tax rate on a married resident of Nods making 150,000 CHF was 12.5%, while an unmarried resident's rate was 18.3%. For comparison, the average rate for the entire canton in 2006 was 13.9% and the nationwide rate was 11.6%. In 2009 there were a total of 317 tax payers in the municipality. Of that total, 123 made over 75 thousand CHF per year. There were 4 people who made between 15 and 20 thousand per year. The average income of the over 75,000 CHF group in Nods was 113,503 CHF, while the average across all of Switzerland was 130,478 CHF.

== Religion ==
From the 2000 census, 448 or 67.1% belonged to the Swiss Reformed Church, while 77 or 11.5% were Roman Catholic. Of the rest of the population, there were 2 members of an Orthodox church (or about 0.30% of the population), and there were 20 individuals (or about 2.99% of the population) who belonged to another Christian church. There was 1 individual who was Islamic. 106 (or about 15.87% of the population) belonged to no church, are agnostic or atheist, and 24 individuals (or about 3.59% of the population) did not answer the question.

== Education ==
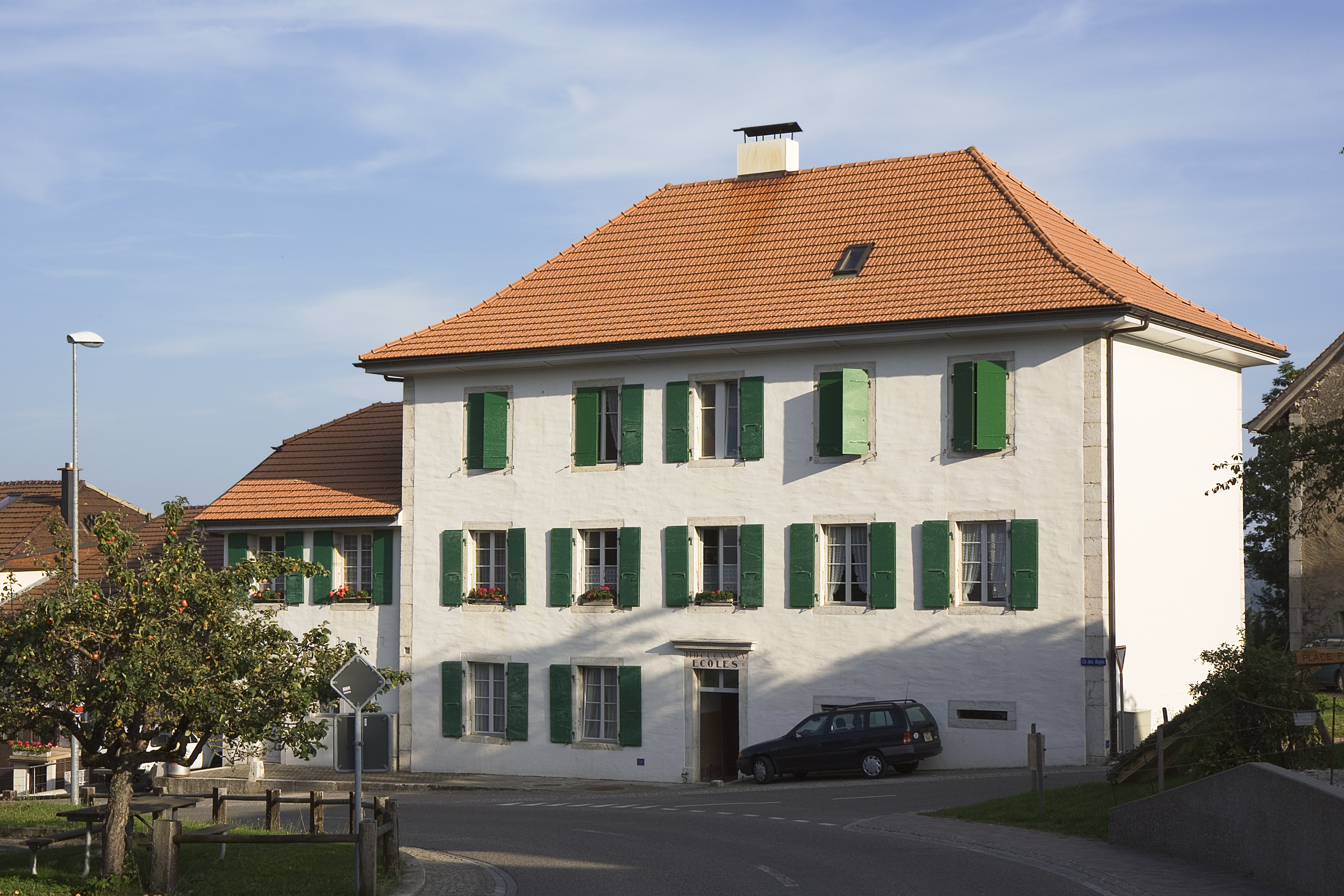
The school building at Nods

In Nods about 54.2% of the population have completed non-mandatory upper secondary education, and 19.1% have completed additional higher education (either university or a Fachhochschule). Of the 77 who had completed some form of tertiary schooling listed in the census, 63.6% were Swiss men, 31.2% were Swiss women.

The Canton of Bern school system provides one year of non-obligatory Kindergarten, followed by six years of Primary school. This is followed by three years of obligatory lower Secondary school where the students are separated according to ability and aptitude. Following the lower Secondary students may attend additional schooling or they may enter an apprenticeship.

During the 2011-12 school year, there were a total of 62 students attending classes in Nods. There were no kindergarten classes in the municipality. The municipality had 3 primary classes and 62 students. Of the primary students, 1.6% were permanent or temporary residents of Switzerland (not citizens) and 16.1% have a different mother language than the classroom language.

As of 2000, there were a total of 67 students attending any school in the municipality. Of those, 21 both lived and attended school in the municipality, while 46 students came from another municipality. During the same year, 92 residents attended schools outside the municipality.
