= Cormoret railway station =

Railway station in Cormoret, Bern, Switzerland

Cormoret
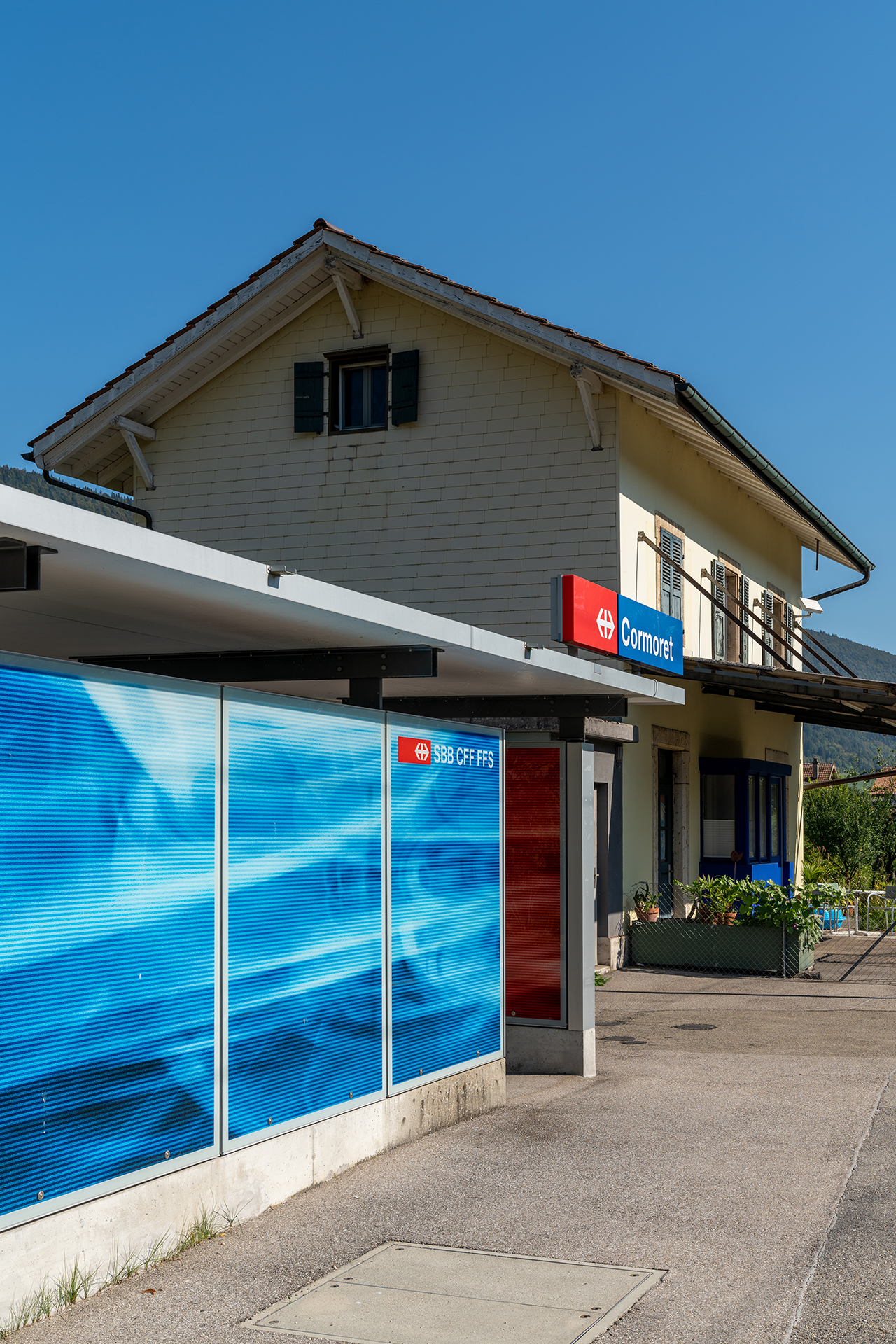
- The station building in 2018

General information
- Location: Cormoret; Switzerland
- Coordinates: 47°10′23″N 7°03′15″E
- Elevation: 710 m (2,330 ft)
- Owner: Swiss Federal Railways
- Line: Biel/Bienne–La Chaux-de-Fonds line
- Distance: 57.6 km (35.8 mi) from Bern
- Platforms: 1 side platform
- Tracks: 1
- Train operators: Swiss Federal Railways

Construction
- Parking: 4
- Accessible: No

Other information
- Station code: 8504308 (CORM)
- Fare zone: 66 (Onde Verte); 323 (Libero)

Passengers
- 2023: 80 per weekday (SBB)

Services
Preceding station	SBB CFF FFS	Following station
Villeret towards La Chaux-de-Fonds	R41	Courtelary towards Biel/Bienne
Location

Cormoret railway station (French: Gare de Cormoret) is a railway station in the municipality of Cormoret, in the Swiss canton of Bern. It is an intermediate stop on the standard gauge Biel/Bienne–La Chaux-de-Fonds line of Swiss Federal Railways.

== Services ==
As of the December 2023 timetable change, the following services stop at Cormoret:

- Regio: hourly service between La Chaux-de-Fonds and Biel/Bienne.
