= Villeret railway station =

Railway station in Villeret, Switzerland

Villeret
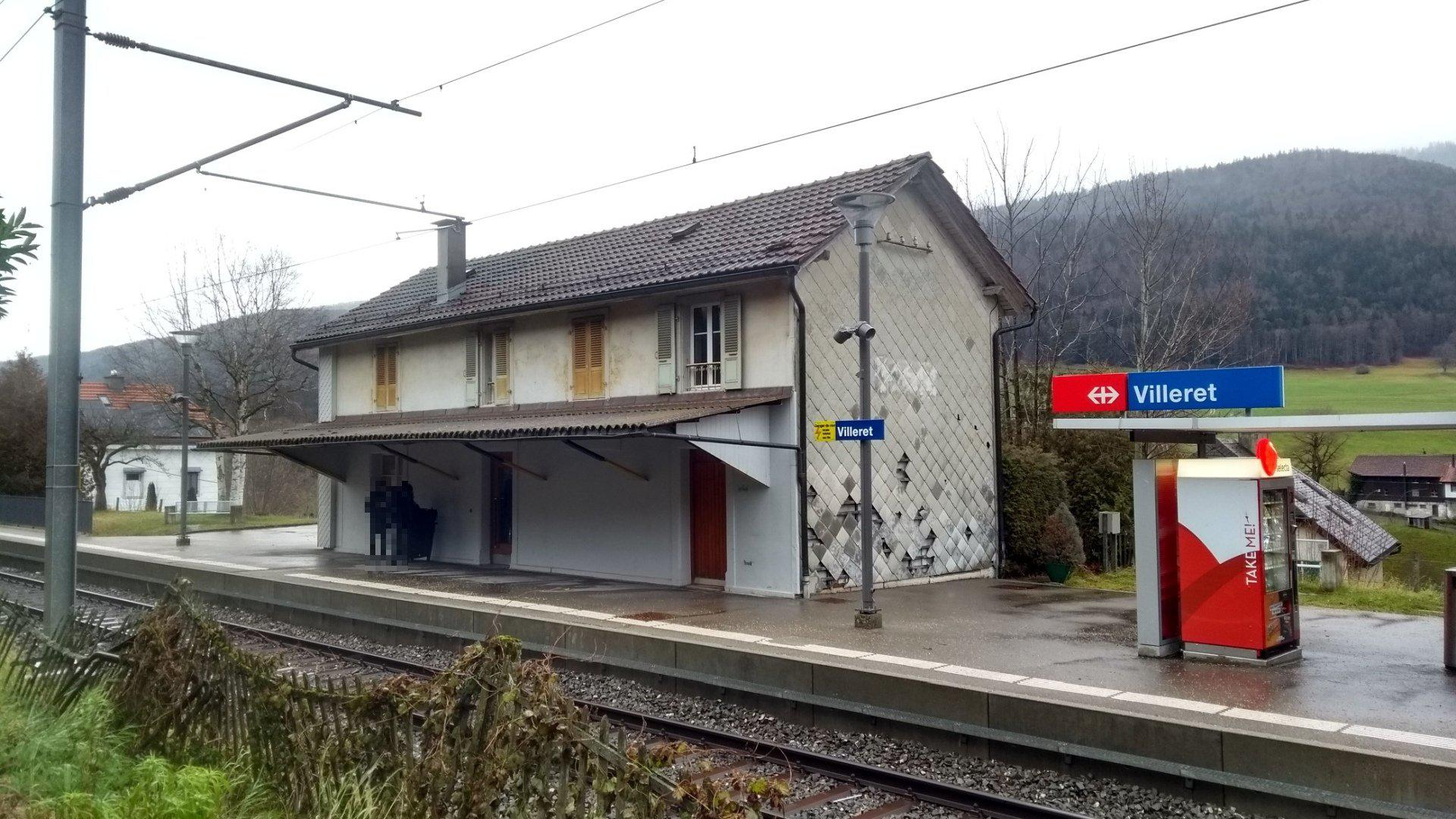
- The station in 2018

General information
- Location: Villeret; Switzerland
- Coordinates: 47°09′37″N 7°01′11″E
- Elevation: 763 m (2,503 ft)
- Owner: Swiss Federal Railways
- Line: Biel/Bienne–La Chaux-de-Fonds line
- Distance: 60.6 km (37.7 mi) from Bern
- Platforms: 1 side platform
- Tracks: 1
- Train operators: Swiss Federal Railways

Construction
- Accessible: Yes

Other information
- Station code: 8504309 (VT)
- Fare zone: 66 (Onde Verte); 323 (Libero)

Passengers
- 2023: 130 per weekday (SBB)

Services
Preceding station	SBB CFF FFS	Following station
St-Imier towards La Chaux-de-Fonds	R41	Cormoret towards Biel/Bienne
Location

Villeret railway station (French: Gare de Villeret) is a railway station in the municipality of Villeret, in the Swiss canton of Bern. It is an intermediate stop on the standard gauge Biel/Bienne–La Chaux-de-Fonds line of Swiss Federal Railways.

== Services ==
As of the December 2023 timetable change, the following services stop at Villeret:

- Regio: hourly service between La Chaux-de-Fonds and Biel/Bienne.
