= RJB =

RJB may refer to:

- Radio Jura bernois, Swiss radio broadcaster
- Rajbiraj Airport, Nepal, IATA airport code
- Ring junger Bünde, an umbrella organisation for German youth associations
- RJB Mining, a British coal company which became UK Coal
- RJ Balaji, Indian radio jockey, actor and filmmaker
