= Sonvilier railway station =

Railway station in Sonvilier, Switzerland

Sonvilier
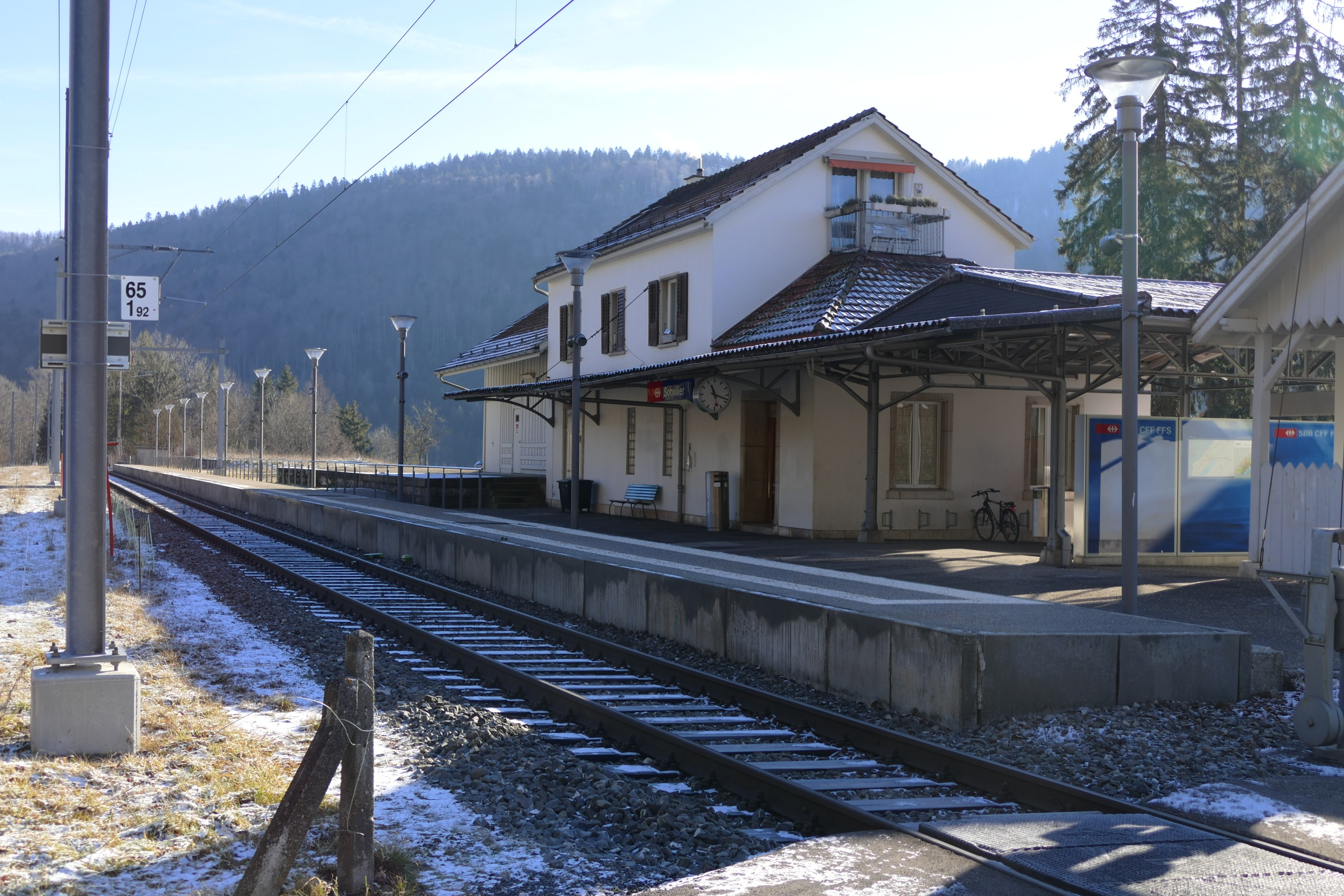
- The station in 2019

General information
- Location: Sonvilier; Switzerland
- Coordinates: 47°08′29″N 6°58′10″E
- Elevation: 836 m (2,743 ft)
- Owner: Swiss Federal Railways
- Line: Biel/Bienne–La Chaux-de-Fonds line
- Distance: 65.2 km (40.5 mi) from Bern
- Platforms: 1 side platform
- Tracks: 1
- Train operators: Swiss Federal Railways

Construction
- Accessible: Yes

Other information
- Station code: 8504311 (SV)
- Fare zone: 31 (Onde Verte); 324 (Libero)

Passengers
- 2023: 190 per weekday (SBB)

Services
Preceding station	SBB CFF FFS	Following station
Renan BE towards La Chaux-de-Fonds	R41	St-Imier towards Biel/Bienne
Location

Sonvilier railway station (French: Gare de Sonvilier) is a railway station in the municipality of Sonvilier, in the Swiss canton of Bern. It is an intermediate stop on the standard gauge Biel/Bienne–La Chaux-de-Fonds line of Swiss Federal Railways.

The station is situated in the Vallon de Saint-Imier, in the French-speaking part of the canton of Bern. It serves the municipality of Sonvilier and provides connections to the regional centres of Biel/Bienne and La Chaux-de-Fonds.

The railway line through Sonvilier was opened in 1859 and forms part of the historic railway connection between Biel/Bienne and La Chaux-de-Fonds. The line was electrified in 1934.

Sonvilier is an intermediate stop on the line. The station has a single track and one side platform. Regional passenger services connect the station with Biel/Bienne and La Chaux-de-Fonds, generally providing an approximately hourly service in both directions.

The station is located close to the centre of Sonvilier and serves as an important public transport connection for the municipality and surrounding area. Parking is available at the station through the SBB P+Rail facility.

== Services ==
As of the December 2023 timetable change, the following services stop at Sonvilier:

- Regio: hourly service between La Chaux-de-Fonds and Biel/Bienne.

The following regional services serve Sonvilier:

Regional trains towards Biel/Bienne.

Regional trains towards La Chaux-de-Fonds.

== Station layout ==
Sonvilier railway station consists of a single platform serving the railway line. The station is situated on the single-track section of the Biel/Bienne–La Chaux-de-Fonds route.
