= Villeret, Switzerland =

Villeret
- Municipality
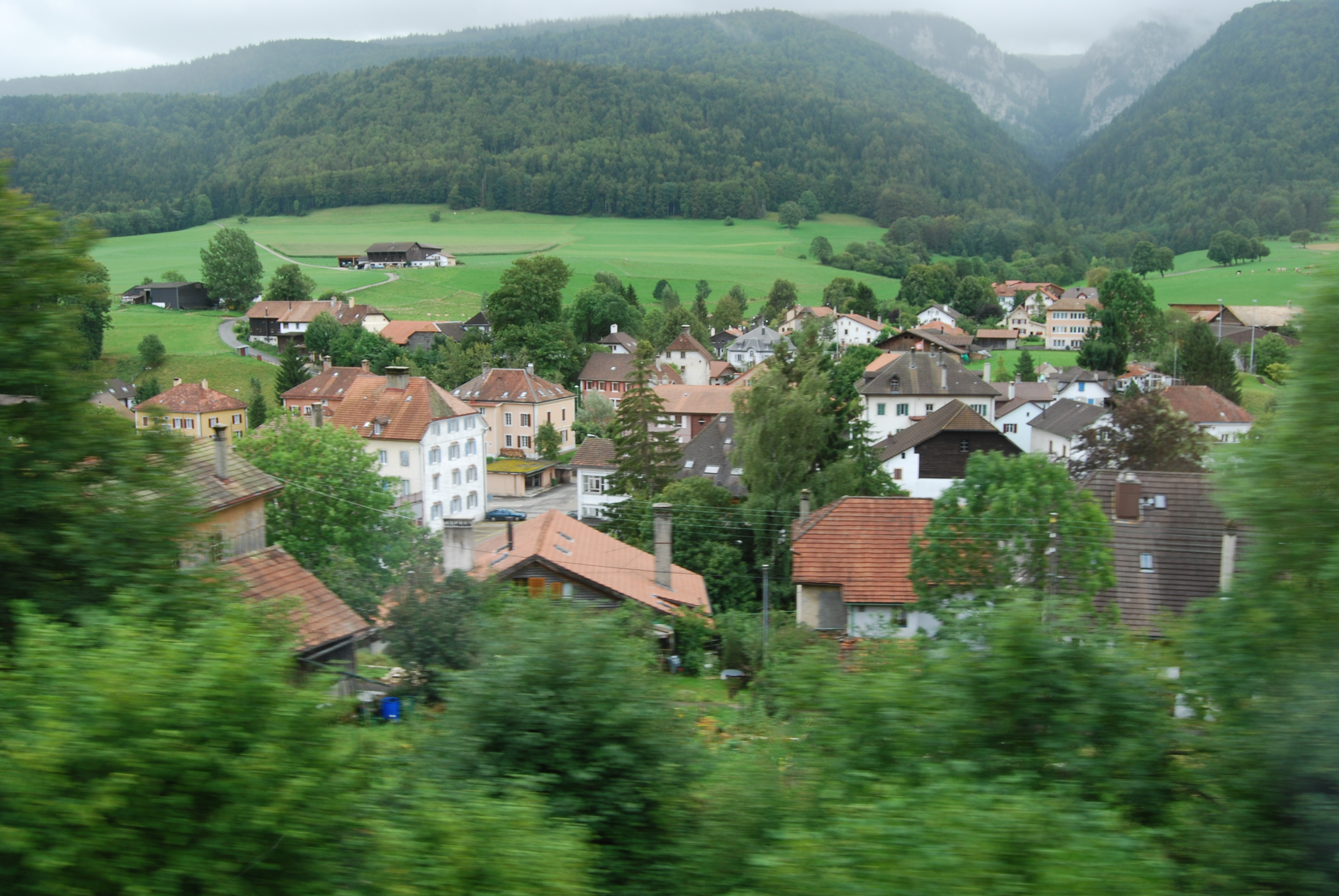

- Flag Coat of arms
- Location of Villeret
- Location within Switzerland Location within Canton of Bern
- Coordinates: 47°10′N 7°1′E
- Country: Switzerland
- Canton: Bern
- District: Jura bernois

Government
  - Executive: Conseil municipal with 7 members
  - Mayor: Maire; Dave von Kaenel (as of 2026)

Area
  - Total: 16.22 km^{2} (6.26 sq mi)
- Elevation: 740 m (2,430 ft)

Population (Dec 2011)
  - Total: 890
  - Density: 55/km^{2} (140/sq mi)
- Time zone: UTC+01:00 (CET)
  - Summer (DST): UTC+02:00 (CEST)
- Postal code: 2613
- SFOS number: 448
- ISO 3166 code: CH-BE
- Surrounded by: Saint-Imier, Nods, Cormoret, Les Breuleux, Muriaux, Villiers
- Twin towns: Louzac-Saint-André (France)
- Website: www.villeret.ch

Villeret (French pronunciation: [vilʁɛ]) is a municipality in the Jura bernois administrative district in the canton of Bern in Switzerland. It is located in the French-speaking Bernese Jura (Jura Bernois).

== History ==
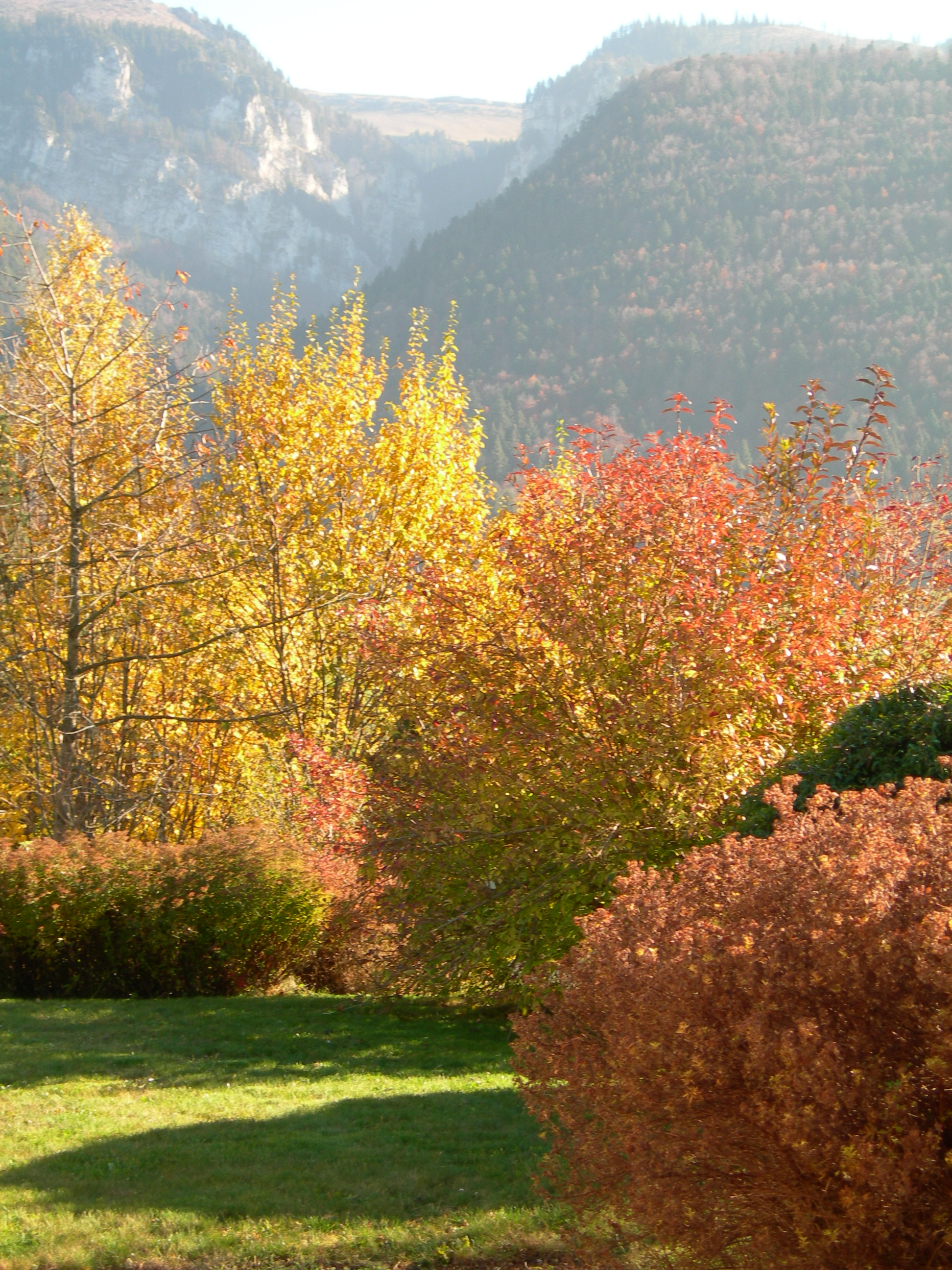
Fall in the Combe-Grède/Chasseral nature reserve

Aerial view (1950)

Villeret is first mentioned in 1390 as Villeret.

During the Late Middle Ages and the Early Modern Era it was part of the seigniory of Erguel under the Prince-Bishop of Basel. After the 1797 French victory and the Treaty of Campo Formio, Villeret became part of the French Département of Mont-Terrible. Three years later, in 1800 it became part of the Département of Haut-Rhin. After Napoleon's defeat and the Congress of Vienna, Villeret was assigned to the Canton of Bern in 1815. In 1932 the Combe-Grède/Chasseral nature reserve was established in the municipal borders.

The village was part of the parish of Saint-Imier until 1951, when it separated to form an independent parish. The village Reformed church was built in 1936-37.

During the mid-18th century a number of forges, mills, sawmills and hammermills were built along the Suze river. The numerous mills and available water power attracted many blacksmiths, nailsmiths and locksmiths to the village. In 1725, the watch industry first entered the village and the craftsmen began producing watch parts. Starting in 1735, watchmaking moguls such as the Blancpain family built houses, infrastructure, factories and public areas to attract skilled craftsmen to Villeret. The completion of the Biel-Les Convers railroad in 1874 caused another population boom, which had reached its zenith by 1910. The financial crises of the 1930s and 1970s devastated the watch industry. The industry began to recover in 1993 when Cartier decided to open to factory in Villeret. This was followed in 2000 by the Straumann dental implants and instruments factory. However, in 2003, Cartier closed their factory. In 2005, the manufacturing sector makes up almost three-fourths of all jobs in the municipality.

== Geography ==
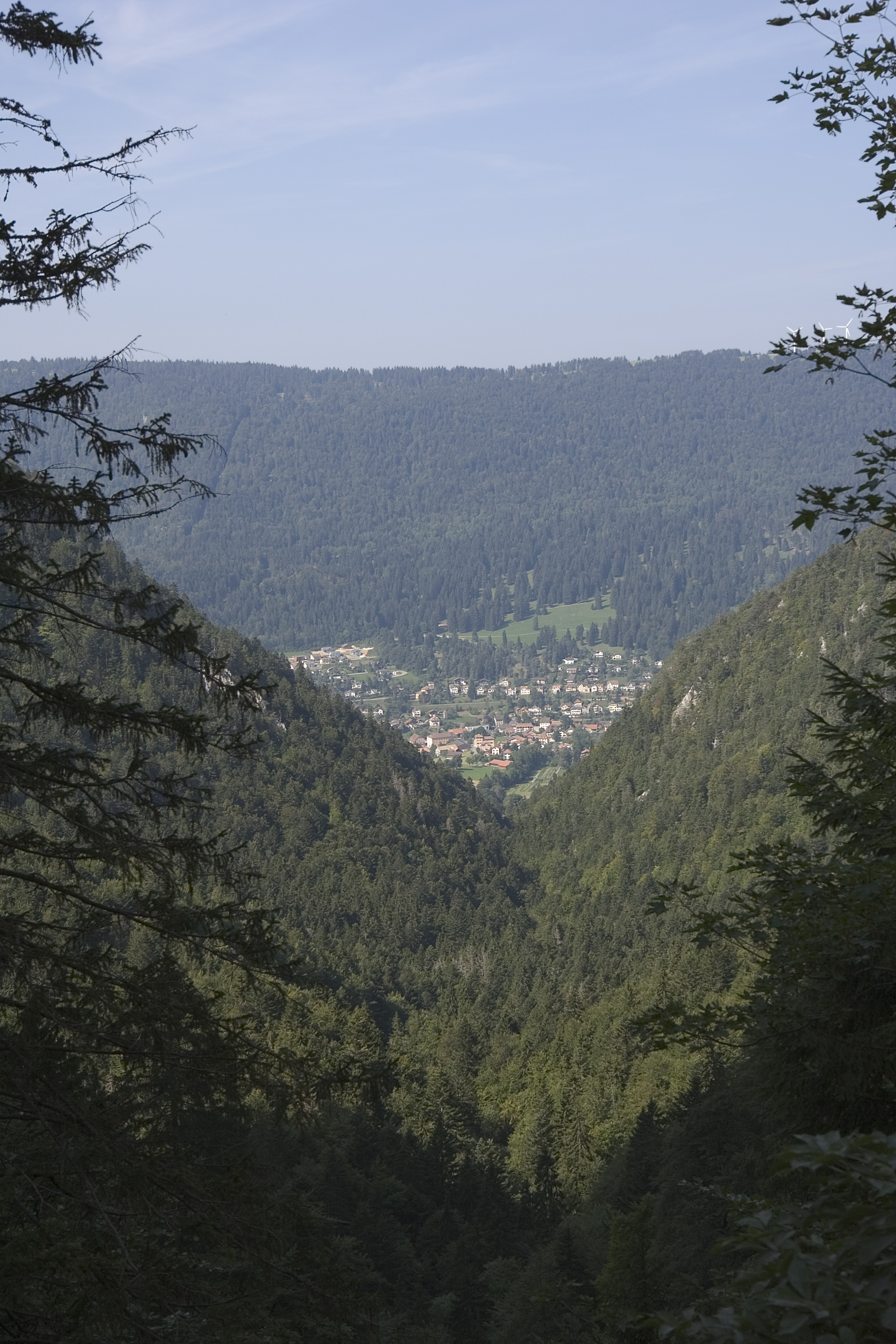
Villeret as seen through the Combe Grède

Villeret has an area of 16.24 km^{2} (6.27 sq mi). Of this area, 7.37 km^{2} (2.85 mi^{2}) or 45.4% is used for agricultural purposes, while 8.11 km^{2} (3.13 mi^{2}) or 49.9% is forested. Of the rest of the land, 0.65 km^{2} (0.25 mi^{2}) or 4.0% is settled (buildings or roads), 0.01 km^{2} (2.5 acres) or 0.1% is either rivers or lakes and 0.12 km^{2} (30 acres) or 0.7% is unproductive land.

Of the built up area, housing and buildings made up 1.7% and transportation infrastructure made up 1.8%. Out of the forested land, 45.1% of the total land area is heavily forested and 4.8% is covered with orchards or small clusters of trees. Of the agricultural land, 6.3% is used for growing crops and 12.4% is pastures and 26.6% is used for alpine pastures. All the water in the municipality is flowing water.

The municipality is located in the Bernese Jura at the foot of Mount Chasseral.

On 31 December 2009 District de Courtelary, the municipality's former district, was dissolved. On the following day, 1 January 2010, it joined the newly created Arrondissement administratif Jura bernois.

== Coat of arms ==
The blazon of the municipal coat of arms is Gules on a Bend Argent three Trefoils downpointing Vert all within a Border Or.

== Demographics ==
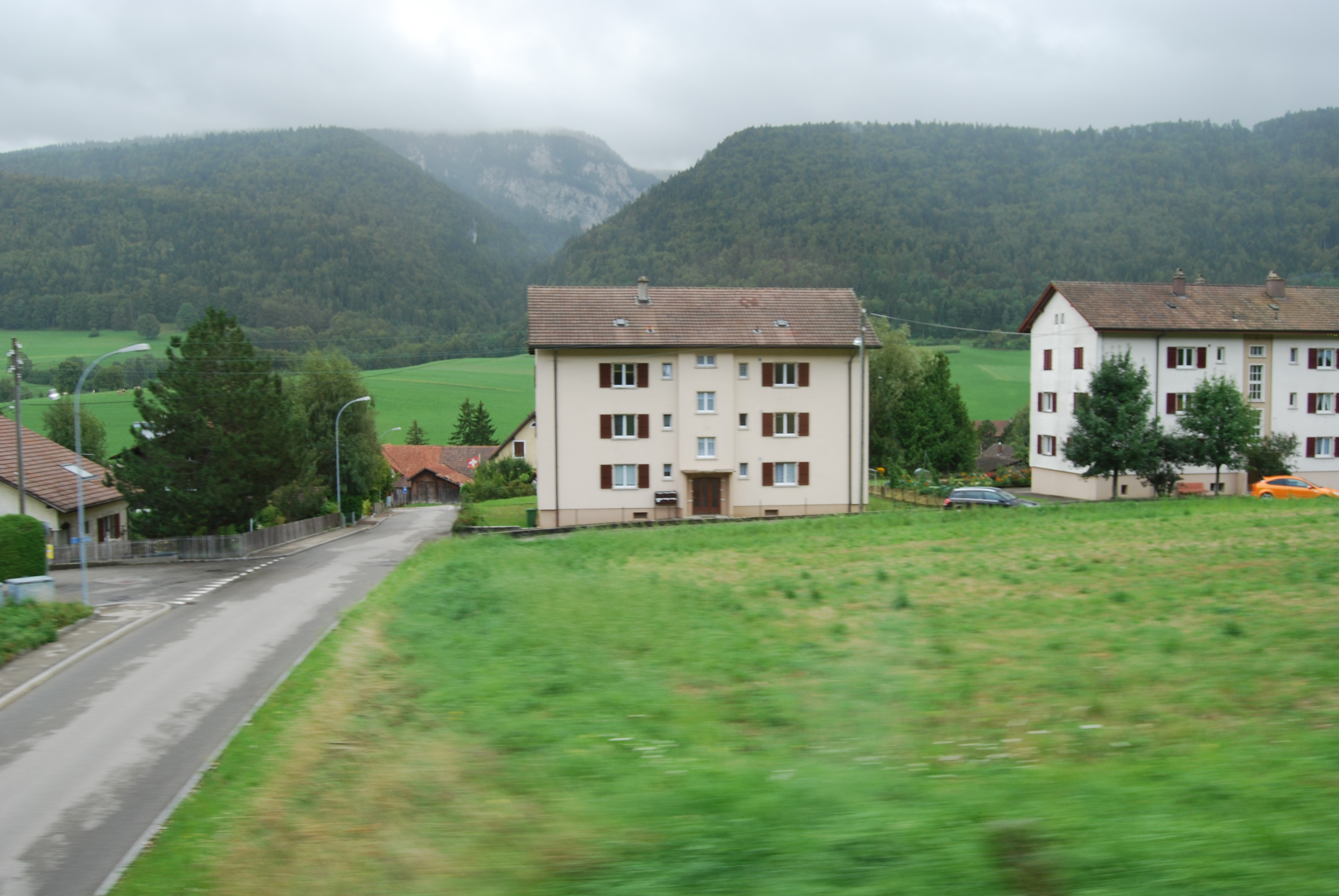
Small apartment buildings in Villeret

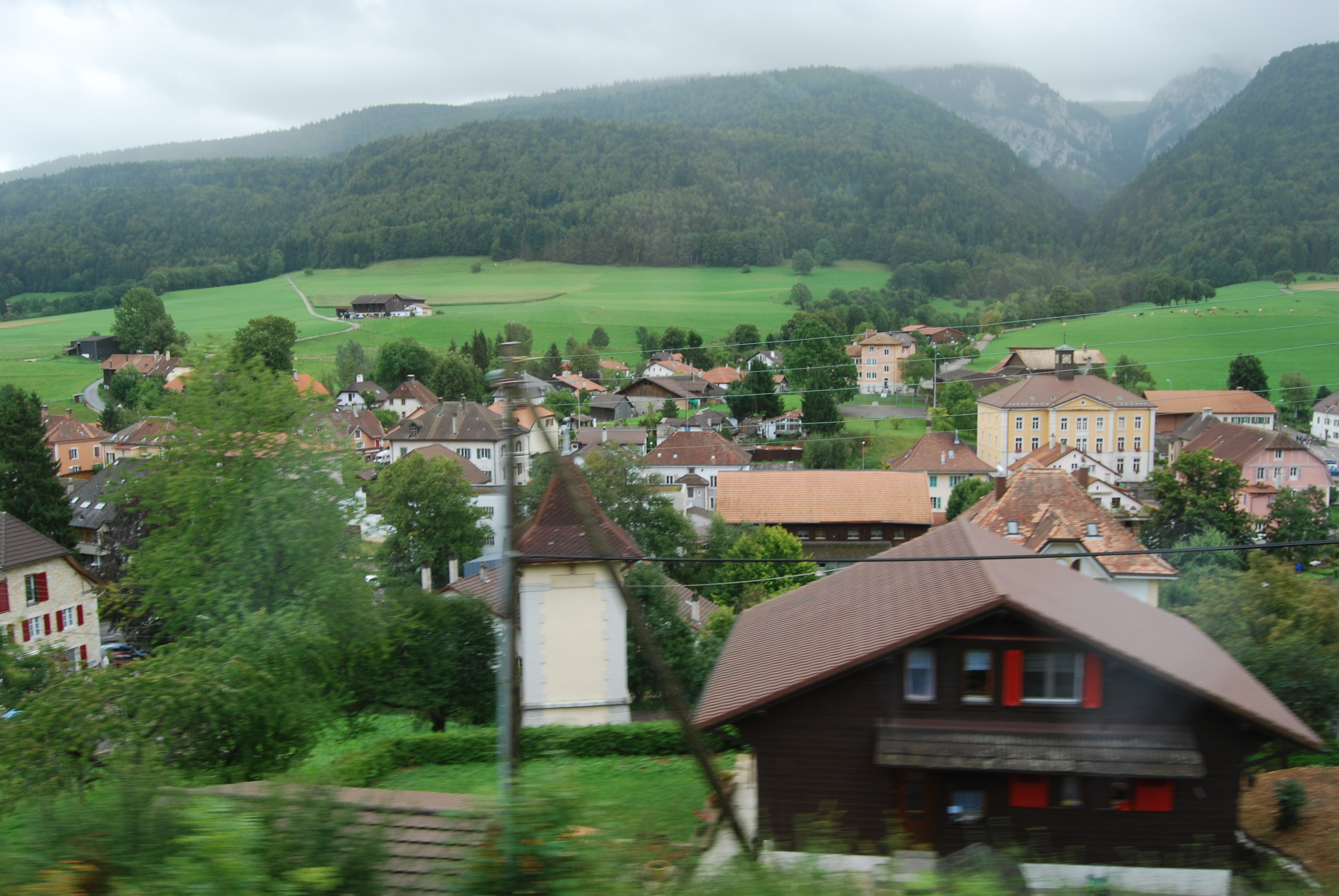
Villeret village

Villeret has a population (as of December 2020) of 941. As of 2010, 9.6% of the population are resident foreign nationals. Over the last 10 years (2000-2010) the population has changed at a rate of -3.3%. Migration accounted for -3.1%, while births and deaths accounted for -0.9%.

Most of the population (as of 2000) speaks French (749 or 83.1%) as their first language, German is the second most common (102 or 11.3%) and Albanian is the third (22 or 2.4%). There are 14 people who speak Italian and 1 person who speaks Romansh.

As of 2008, the population was 49.5% male and 50.5% female. The population was made up of 395 Swiss men (44.5% of the population) and 44 (5.0%) non-Swiss men. There were 407 Swiss women (45.9%) and 41 (4.6%) non-Swiss women. Of the population in the municipality, 217 or about 24.1% were born in Villeret and lived there in 2000. There were 296 or 32.9% who were born in the same canton, while 215 or 23.9% were born somewhere else in Switzerland, and 120 or 13.3% were born outside of Switzerland.

As of 2010, children and teenagers (0–19 years old) make up 21.1% of the population, while adults (20–64 years old) make up 58.9% and seniors (over 64 years old) make up 20.1%.

As of 2000, there were 347 people who were single and never married in the municipality. There were 457 married individuals, 51 widows or widowers and 46 individuals who are divorced.

As of 2000, there were 124 households that consist of only one person and 28 households with five or more people. In 2000, a total of 375 apartments (84.5% of the total) were permanently occupied, while 33 apartments (7.4%) were seasonally occupied and 36 apartments (8.1%) were empty. As of 2010, the construction rate of new housing units was 1.1 new units per 1000 residents. The vacancy rate for the municipality, in 2011, was 4%.

The historical population is given in the following chart:

== Politics ==
In the 2011 federal election the most popular party was the Swiss People's Party (SVP) which received 26.8% of the vote. The next three most popular parties were the Social Democratic Party (SP) (25.9%), the Green Party (11.8%) and the FDP.The Liberals (11.1%). In the federal election, a total of 234 votes were cast, and the voter turnout was 36.4%.

== Economy ==
As of 2011, Villeret had an unemployment rate of 2.58%. As of 2008, there were a total of 749 people employed in the municipality. Of these, there were 40 people employed in the primary economic sector and about 13 businesses involved in this sector. 635 people were employed in the secondary sector and there were 15 businesses in this sector. 74 people were employed in the tertiary sector, with 29 businesses in this sector. There were 443 residents of the municipality who were employed in some capacity, of which females made up 44.2% of the workforce.

In 2008 there were a total of 703 full-time equivalent jobs. The number of jobs in the primary sector was 30, all of which were in agriculture. The number of jobs in the secondary sector was 614 of which 607 or (98.9%) were in manufacturing and 5 (0.8%) were in construction. The number of jobs in the tertiary sector was 59. In the tertiary sector; 14 or 23.7% were in wholesale or retail sales or the repair of motor vehicles, 8 or 13.6% were in the movement and storage of goods, 11 or 18.6% were in a hotel or restaurant, 7 or 11.9% were technical professionals or scientists, 10 or 16.9% were in education.

In 2000, there were 371 workers who commuted into the municipality and 318 workers who commuted away. The municipality is a net importer of workers, with about 1.2 workers entering the municipality for every one leaving. About 12.9% of the workforce coming into Villeret are coming from outside Switzerland. Of the working population, 10.8% used public transportation to get to work, and 61.6% used a private car.

== Religion ==
From the 2000 census, 160 or 17.8% were Roman Catholic, while 432 or 47.9% belonged to the Swiss Reformed Church. Of the rest of the population, there were 2 members of an Orthodox church (or about 0.22% of the population), there was 1 individual who belongs to the Christian Catholic Church, and there were 88 individuals (or about 9.77% of the population) who belonged to another Christian church. There were 37 (or about 4.11% of the population) who were Islamic. There was 1 person who was Buddhist. 174 (or about 19.31% of the population) belonged to no church, are agnostic or atheist, and 50 individuals (or about 5.55% of the population) did not answer the question.

== Education ==
In Villeret about 318 or (35.3%) of the population have completed non-mandatory upper secondary education, and 116 or (12.9%) have completed additional higher education (either university or a Fachhochschule). Of the 116 who completed tertiary schooling, 62.1% were Swiss men, 16.4% were Swiss women, 9.5% were non-Swiss men and 12.1% were non-Swiss women.

The Canton of Bern school system provides one year of non-obligatory Kindergarten, followed by six years of Primary school. This is followed by three years of obligatory lower Secondary school where the students are separated according to ability and aptitude. Following the lower Secondary students may attend additional schooling or they may enter an apprenticeship.

During the 2010-11 school year, there were a total of 95 students attending classes in Villeret. There was one kindergarten class with a total of 17 students in the municipality. Of the kindergarten students, 5.9% were permanent or temporary residents of Switzerland (not citizens). The municipality had 4 primary classes and 78 students. Of the primary students, 7.7% were permanent or temporary residents of Switzerland (not citizens) and 10.3% have a different mother language than the classroom language. As of 2000, there were 38 students in Villeret who came from another municipality, while 82 residents attended schools outside the municipality.

Villeret is home to the Bibliothèque communale et scolaire du Soleil library. The library has (as of 2008) 6,001 books or other media, and loaned out 3,500 items in the same year. It was open a total of 160 days with average of 4 hours per week during that year.

== Transportation ==
The municipality has a railway station, Villeret. The station is located on the Biel/Bienne–La Chaux-de-Fonds line and has hourly service to Biel/Bienne and La Chaux-de-Fonds.
