= Renan BE railway station =

Railway station in Renan, Switzerland

Renan BE
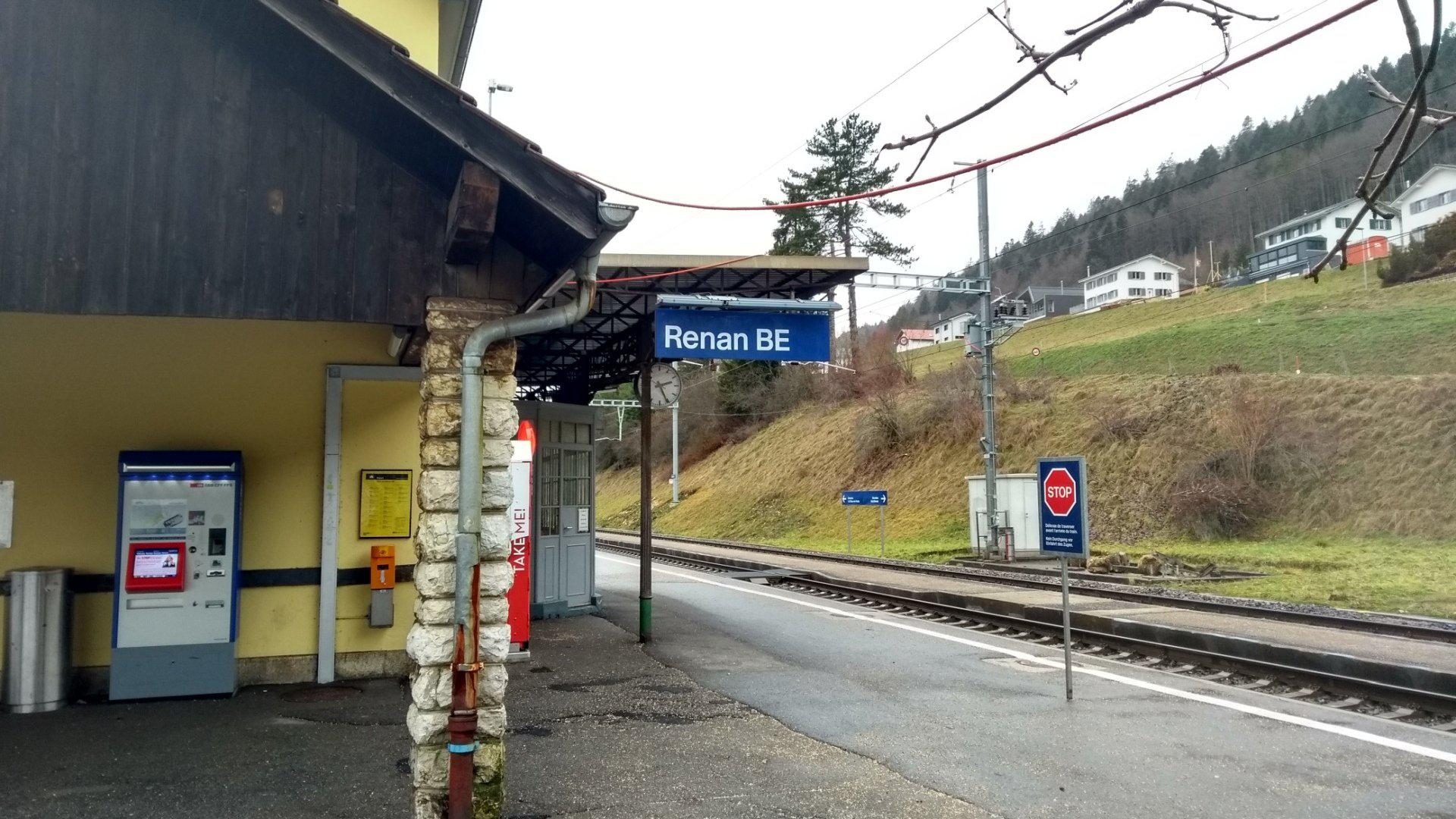
- The station platform in 2018

General information
- Location: Renan; Switzerland
- Coordinates: 47°07′33″N 6°55′31″E
- Elevation: 907 m (2,976 ft)
- Owner: Swiss Federal Railways
- Line: Biel/Bienne–La Chaux-de-Fonds line
- Distance: 69.0 km (42.9 mi) from Bern
- Platforms: 2
- Tracks: 2
- Train operators: Swiss Federal Railways

Construction
- Parking: 8
- Cycle facilities: 6
- Accessible: Yes

Other information
- Station code: 8504312 (RE)
- Fare zone: 21 and 31 (Onde Verte); 324 (Libero)

Passengers
- 2023: 230 per weekday (SBB)

Services
Preceding station	SBB CFF FFS	Following station
La Chaux-de-Fonds Terminus	R41	Sonvilier towards Biel/Bienne
Location

Renan BE railway station (French: Gare de Renan BE) is a railway station in the municipality of Renan, in the Swiss canton of Bern. It is an intermediate stop on the standard gauge Biel/Bienne–La Chaux-de-Fonds line of Swiss Federal Railways.

== Services ==
As of the December 2023 timetable change, the following services stop at Renan BE:

- Regio: hourly service between La Chaux-de-Fonds and Biel/Bienne.
