= Camille Bloch =

Swiss chocolate company

Company logo of Camille Bloch

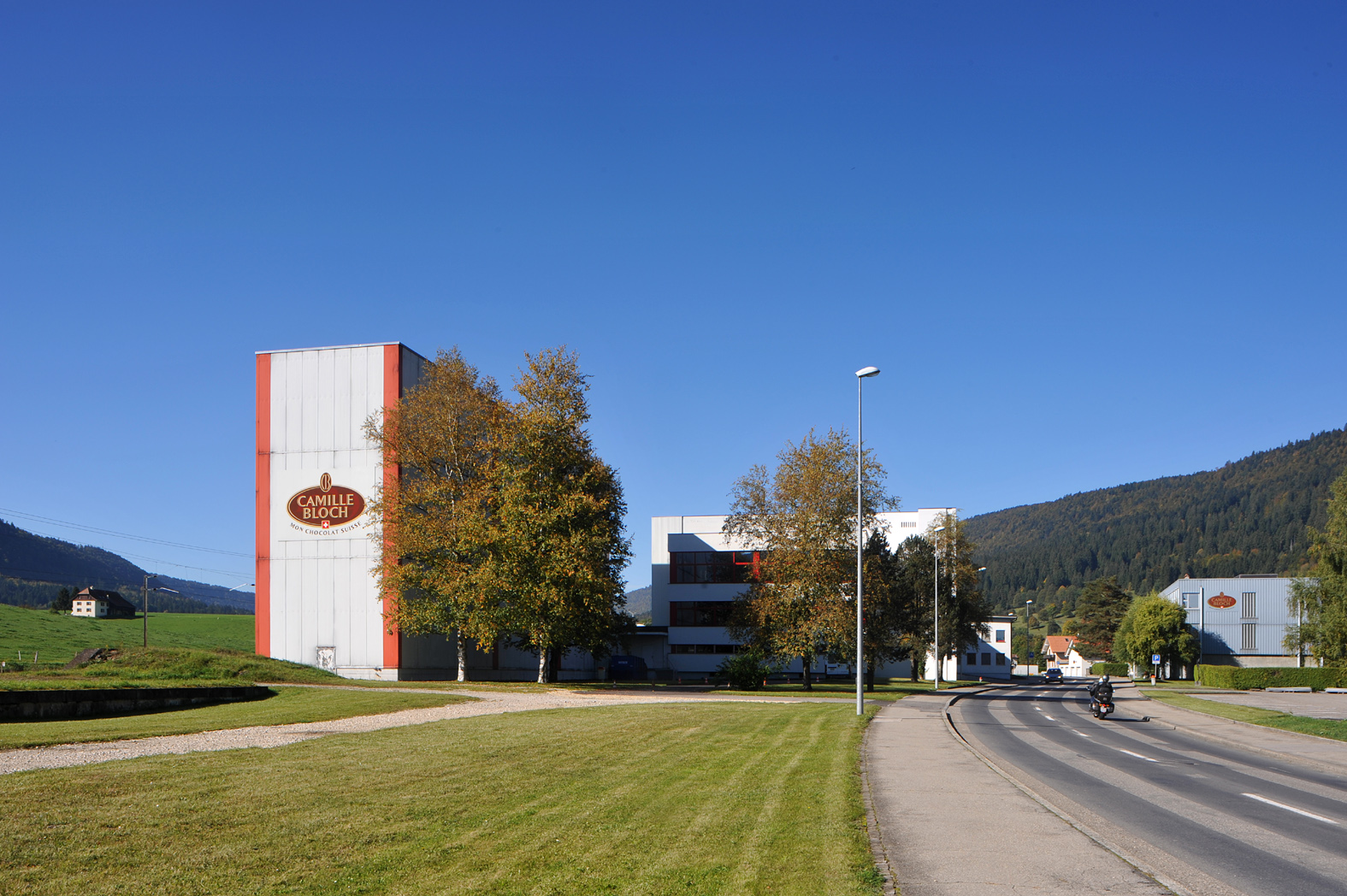
Production (left) and administrative headquarters (rights)

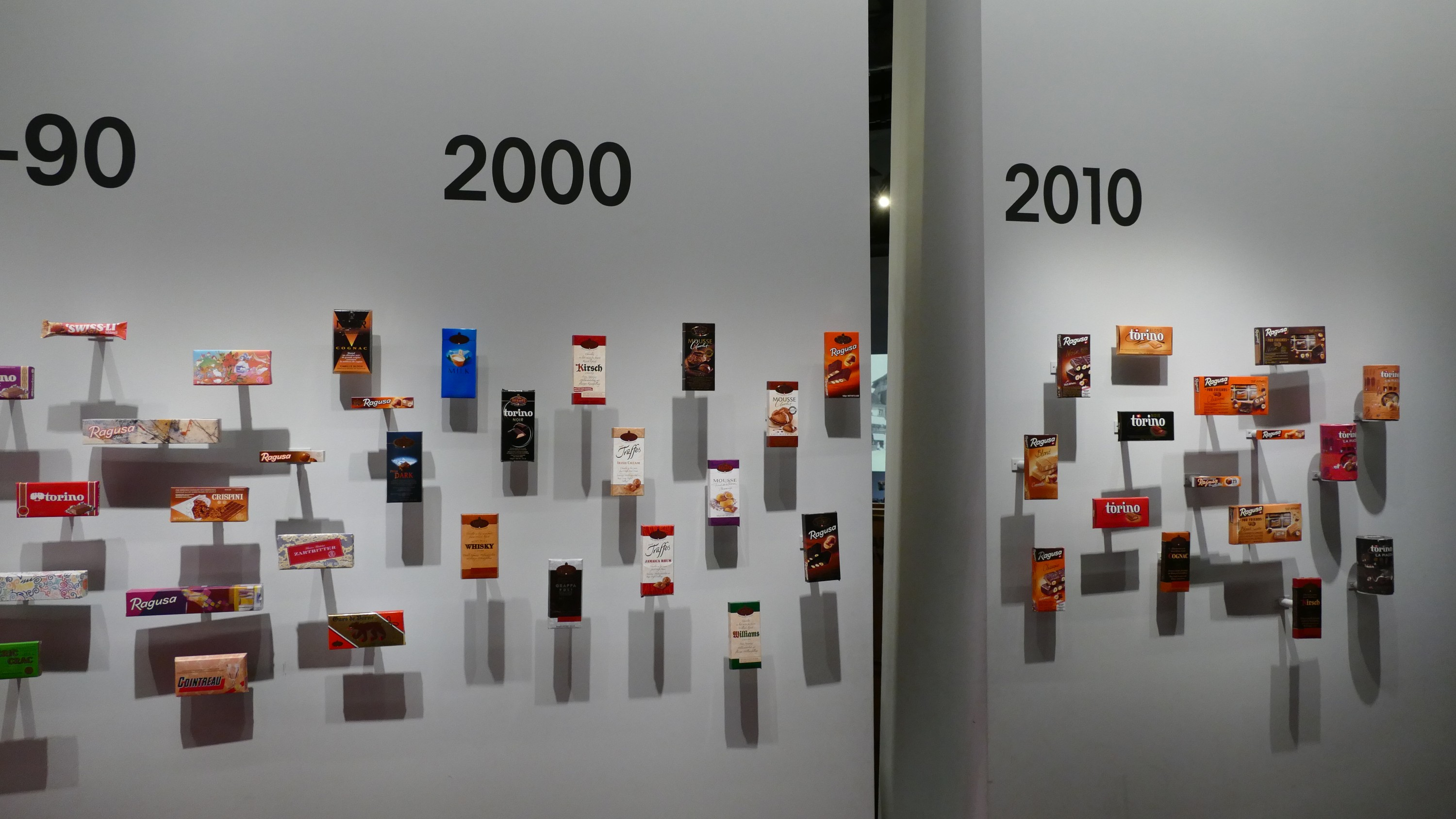
Chocolate bars displayed in the factory museum

Camille Bloch is a Swiss chocolate producer based in Courtelary. It was founded in 1929 in Bern by Camille Bloch (1891 - 1970), a Bernese chocolatier, then moved to Courtelary in the Bernese Jura where production has been since 1935. The family business employed 180 people and in 2016, Camille Bloch produced about 3,500 tons of chocolate, generating sales of around 60 million francs.

The well-known product from Camille Bloch chocolate is the Ragusa since 1942, and the Torino, which are the two main chocolate bars produced by Camille Bloch. The former is essentially a rectangular gianduja bar, including whole hazelnuts and coated on two sides. The latter is a round chocolate bar, with an almond and hazelnut praline filling. Both Ragusa and Torino are made in both individual and 100 g bar formats, and in classic (milk), dark and caramelised white versions. Camille Bloch also produces several liquor-filled chocolates.

== History ==
The company was founded in 1926 by Camille Bloch in Bern under the name "Chocolats et Bonbons Fins Camille Bloch" and entered the commercial register in 1929 as a stock corporation. In 1935 the move to Courtelary and the name change to "Chocolats Camille Bloch SA" took place. After Camille Bloch's death in 1970, his son Rolf Bloch took over the head of the company. In 1997 Rolf Bloch's two sons took over the operational business. Daniel Bloch took over the office of managing director and has been president of the board since 2005, Stéphane Bloch became the sales and marketing manager, board of directors and foundation president.

In 2004 the book “Camille Bloch - 75 years of sweet delights” appeared for the 75th anniversary. In 2017, a visitor centre was opened, which, according to the managing director Daniel Bloch, counted over 100,000 visitors in the first year. In addition, in 2018 the company acquired land in Georgia to grow hazelnuts in-house.

Chocolats Camille Bloch SA has been producing its chocolate specialities completely from the roasting of the cocoa beans, hazelnuts, almonds to finished bars or the table in its only production facility in Courtelary, Switzerland.

== Products ==
The company's most successful product is the Ragusa chocolate bar, which was invented in 1942 as a result of the shortage of chocolate in World War II. The bar contains a hazelnut filling sandwiched between two chocolate layers. According to the managing director Daniel Bloch, the bar accounts for over 50 percent of sales. A variant of 60 percent cocoa content was launched in 2008 under the name “Ragusa Noir”. In 2014 “Ragusa Blond” appeared in which light coloured chocolate and light praline cream were used.

In addition to Ragusa, there are other chocolate brands, such as the Torino brand and the Camille Bloch brand. Since 2020, the company has also been selling pan-coated hazelnuts and almonds under the “So Nuts” brand.
