= St-Imier railway station =

Railway station in Saint-Imier, Switzerland

St-Imier
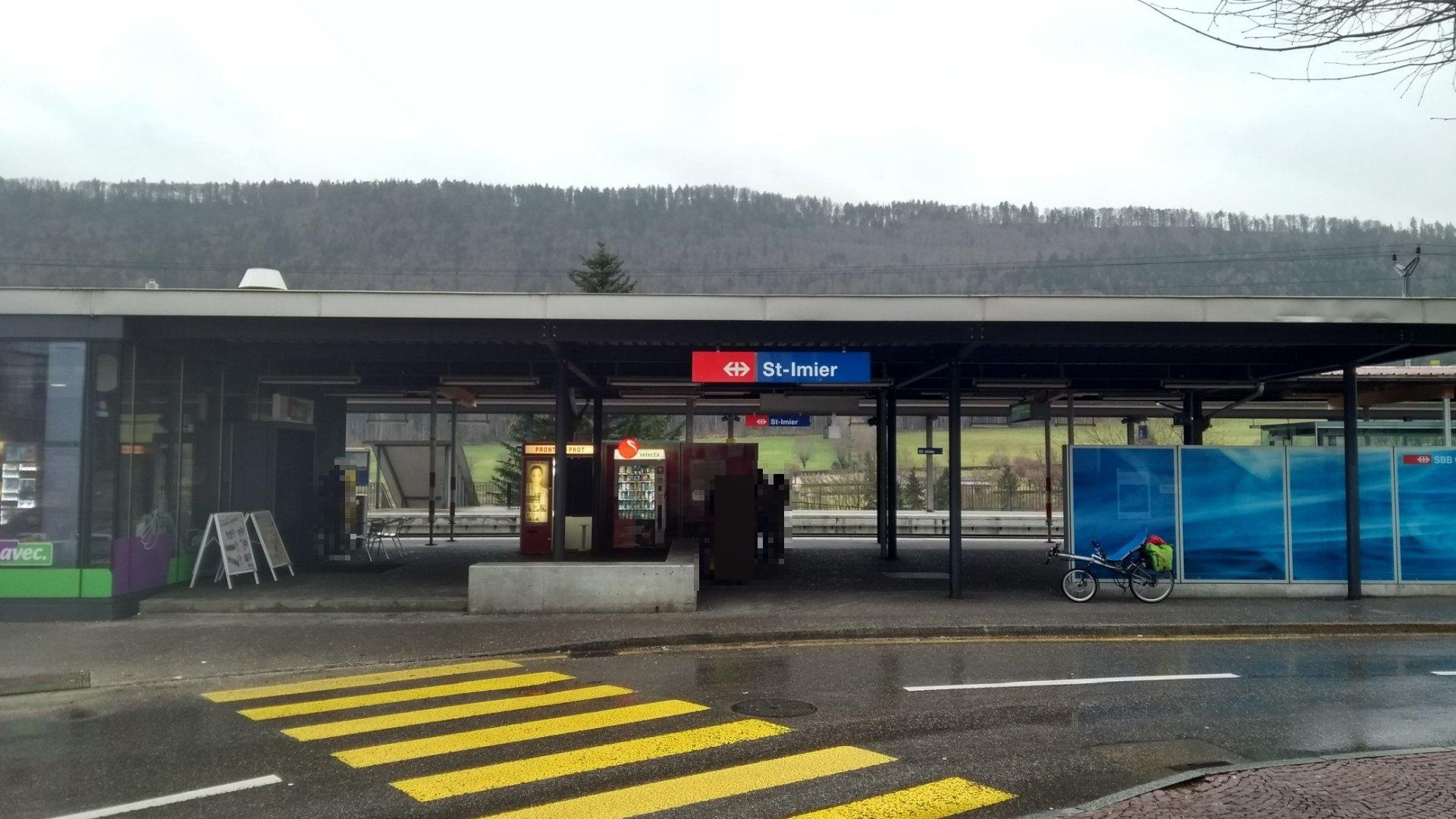
- The station platform in 2018

General information
- Location: Saint-Imier; Switzerland
- Coordinates: 47°09′06″N 7°00′04″E
- Elevation: 793 m (2,602 ft)
- Owner: Swiss Federal Railways
- Line: Biel/Bienne–La Chaux-de-Fonds line
- Distance: 62.4 km (38.8 mi) from Bern
- Platforms: 2 side platforms
- Tracks: 3
- Train operators: Swiss Federal Railways
- Connections: Chemins de fer du Jura buses

Construction
- Parking: 26
- Cycle facilities: 14
- Accessible: Yes

Other information
- Station code: 8504310 (STI)
- Fare zone: 31 and 66 (Onde Verte); 323 and 324 (Libero)

Passengers
- 2023: 2'300 per weekday (SBB)

Services
Preceding station	SBB CFF FFS	Following station
La Chaux-de-Fonds Terminus	RE4	Courtelary towards Biel/Bienne
Sonvilier towards La Chaux-de-Fonds	R41	Villeret towards Biel/Bienne
Location

St-Imier railway station (French: Gare de St-Imier) is a railway station in the municipality of Saint-Imier, in the Swiss canton of Bern. It is an intermediate stop on the standard gauge Biel/Bienne–La Chaux-de-Fonds line of Swiss Federal Railways.

St-Imier (funiculaire), the lower station of Funiculaire Saint-Imier-Mont-Soleil, is about 800 m away.

== Services ==
As of the December 2023 timetable change, the following services stop at St-Imier:

- RegioExpress: hourly service between La Chaux-de-Fonds and Biel/Bienne.
- Regio: hourly service between La Chaux-de-Fonds and Biel/Bienne.
