= Courtelary railway station =

Railway station in Courtelary, Switzerland

Courtelary
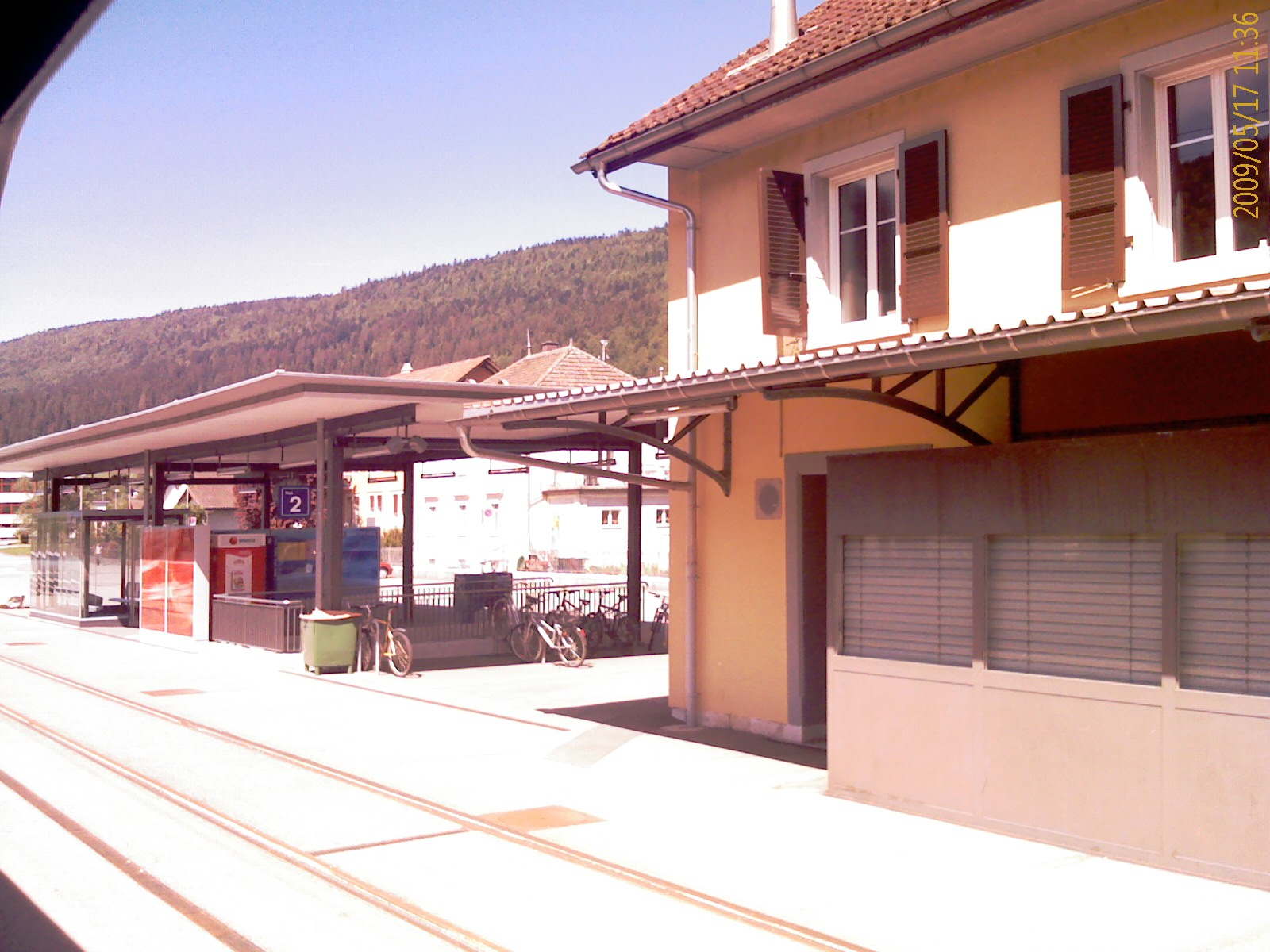
- The station in 2009

General information
- Location: Courtelary; Switzerland
- Coordinates: 47°10′32″N 7°04′08″E
- Elevation: 701 m (2,300 ft)
- Owner: Swiss Federal Railways
- Line: Biel/Bienne–La Chaux-de-Fonds line
- Distance: 56.5 km (35.1 mi) from Bern
- Platforms: 2 side platforms
- Tracks: 2
- Train operators: Swiss Federal Railways

Construction
- Parking: 19
- Cycle facilities: 9
- Accessible: Partly

Other information
- Station code: 8504307 (CTY)
- Fare zone: 66 (Onde Verte); 323 (Libero)

Passengers
- 2023: 590 per weekday (SBB)

Services
Preceding station	SBB CFF FFS	Following station
St-Imier towards La Chaux-de-Fonds	RE4	Sonceboz-Sombeval towards Biel/Bienne
Cormoret towards La Chaux-de-Fonds	R41	Cortébert towards Biel/Bienne
Location

Courtelary railway station (French: Gare de Courtelary) is a railway station in the municipality of Courtelary, in the Swiss canton of Bern. It is an intermediate stop on the standard gauge Biel/Bienne–La Chaux-de-Fonds line of Swiss Federal Railways.

== Services ==
As of the December 2023 timetable change, the following services stop at Courtelary:

- RegioExpress: hourly service between La Chaux-de-Fonds and Biel/Bienne.
- Regio: hourly service between La Chaux-de-Fonds and Biel/Bienne.
