= Clientis Caisse d'Epargne CEC =

Clientis Caisse d’Epargne CEC
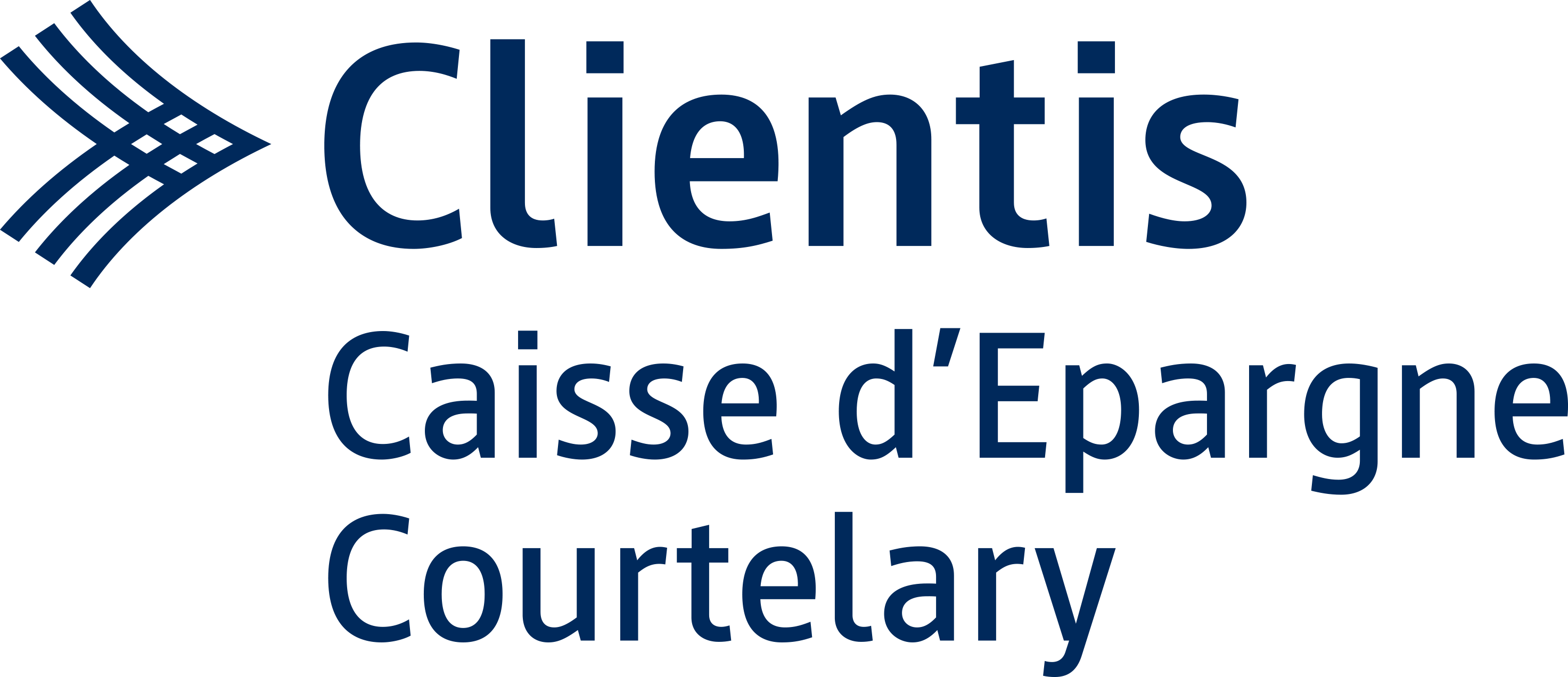
- Native name: Clientis Caisse d'Epargne CEC SA
- Industry: Bank
- Founded: 27 November 1829; 196 years ago
- Headquarters: Grand-Rue 45, 2608 Courtelary, Switzerland
- Key people: Rémy Defilippis (CEO)
- Website: cec.clientis.ch

Clientis Caisse d’Epargne CEC is a Swiss regional bank located in Courtelary, canton of Bern. Other bank offices are in Saint-Imier, Sonceboz, Tramelan and La Chaux-de-Fonds.

The Caisse d'Epargne du Courtelary District was founded in 1829 on the initiative of Charles Ferdinand Morel. He was a priest in Corgémont and wanted to support the local population as well as the economic development of the region.

The business area has traditionally been in retail banking, mortgage banking, private banking and banking with small and medium enterprises.

Clientis Caisse d'Epargne CEC is an independent regional bank of the RBA holding company.
