= Cormoret =

- Municipality
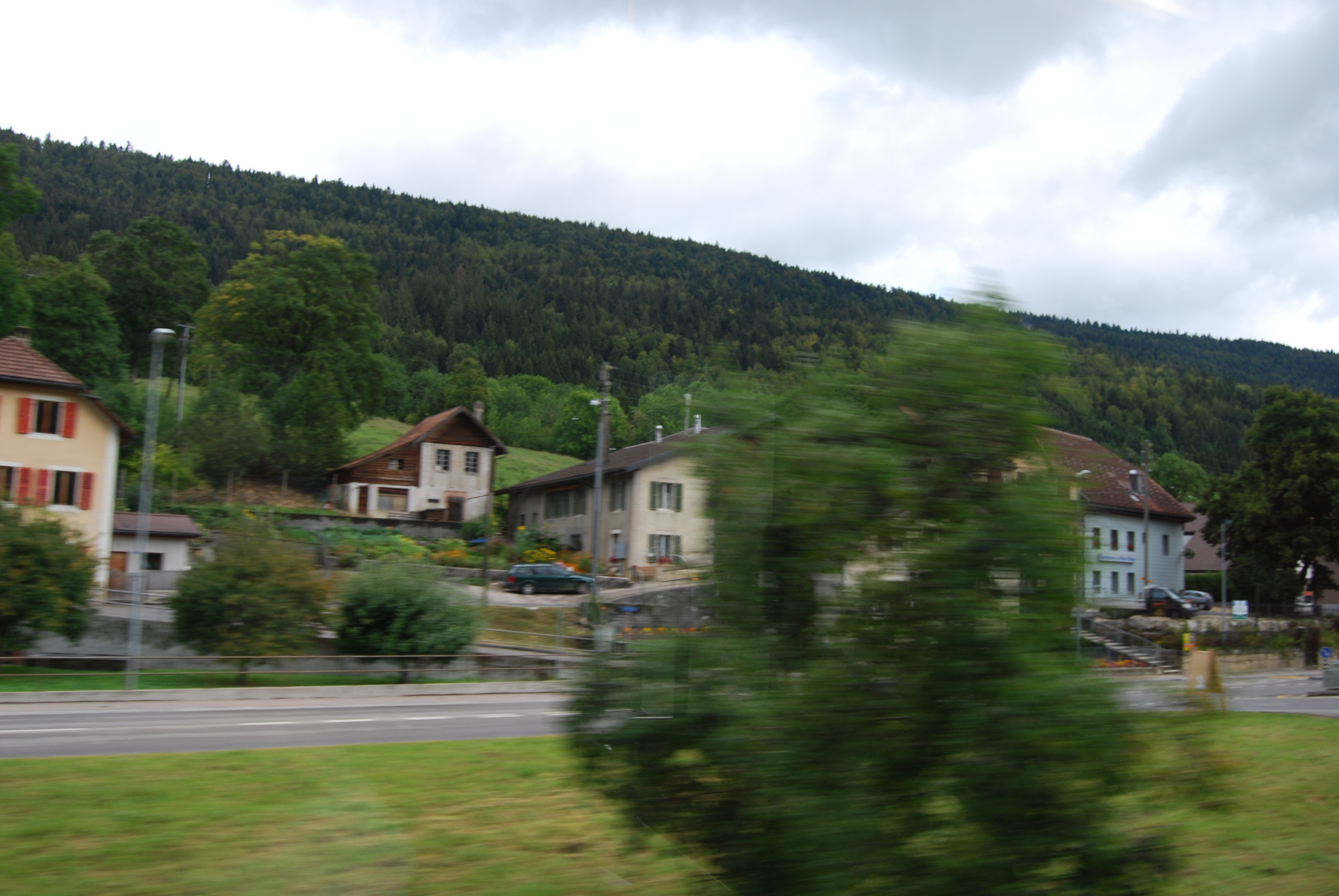

- Flag Coat of arms
- Location of Cormoret
- Location within Switzerland Location within Canton of Bern
- Coordinates: 47°11′N 7°3′E
- Country: Switzerland
- Canton: Bern
- District: Jura bernois

Government
  - Mayor: Maire; Gérard Py

Area
  - Total: 13.43 km^{2} (5.19 sq mi)
- Elevation: 706 m (2,316 ft)

Population (December 2020)
  - Total: 494
  - Density: 36.8/km^{2} (95.3/sq mi)
- Time zone: UTC+01:00 (CET)
  - Summer (DST): UTC+02:00 (CEST)
- Postal code: 2612
- SFOS number: 432
- ISO 3166 code: CH-BE
- Surrounded by: Villeret, Nods, Courtelary, Les Breuleux (JU)
- Website: www.cormoret.ch

Cormoret is a municipality in the Jura bernois administrative district in the canton of Bern in Switzerland. It is located in the French-speaking part of the canton in the Jura Mountains.

== History ==
Aerial view (1949)

Cormoret is first mentioned in 1178. By the end of the 12th Century Cormoret was owned by the town of Saint-Imier. In 1317 Rodolphe IV., count of Neuchâtel granted the village and inhabitants to Jean Compagnet de Courtelary, under the authority of the Prince-Bishop of Basel. Cormoret belonged to the Barony of Erguel. In 1530 the village adopted the Reformed faith.

A fire destroyed part of the town in 1795, but about thirty buildings from the 16th to 19th century still remain in the village. Several water powered mills from the same period also still exist, though many of them were converted into factories in the 19th century. The local economy was built on agriculture and starting in the 19th century on watch manufacturing. The last watch part factory in the village closed in 1983. In 1885 Cormoret built the first public lighting system in Switzerland. The village's train station was built in 1890.

== Geography ==
Cormoret has an area of 13.48 km^{2} (5.20 sq mi). Of this area, 7.31 km^{2} (2.82 mi^{2}) or 54.2% is used for agricultural purposes, while 5.7 km^{2} (2.2 mi^{2}) or 42.3% is forested. Of the rest of the land, 0.45 km^{2} (0.17 mi^{2}) or 3.3% is settled (buildings or roads), 0.03 km^{2} (7.4 acres) or 0.2% is either rivers or lakes and 0.02 km^{2} (4.9 acres) or 0.1% is unproductive land.

Of the built up area, housing and buildings made up 1.4% and transportation infrastructure made up 1.7%. Out of the forested land, 36.8% of the total land area is heavily forested and 5.5% is covered with orchards or small clusters of trees. Of the agricultural land, 8.5% is used for growing crops and 9.6% is pastures and 36.0% is used for alpine pastures. All the water in the municipality is flowing water.

On 31 December 2009 District de Courtelary, the municipality's former district, was dissolved. On the following day, 1 January 2010, it joined the newly created Arrondissement administratif Jura bernois.

== Coat of arms ==
The blazon of the municipal coat of arms is Or two Pales Azure and overall on a Bend Argent three Mullets of Five Gules.

== Demographics ==
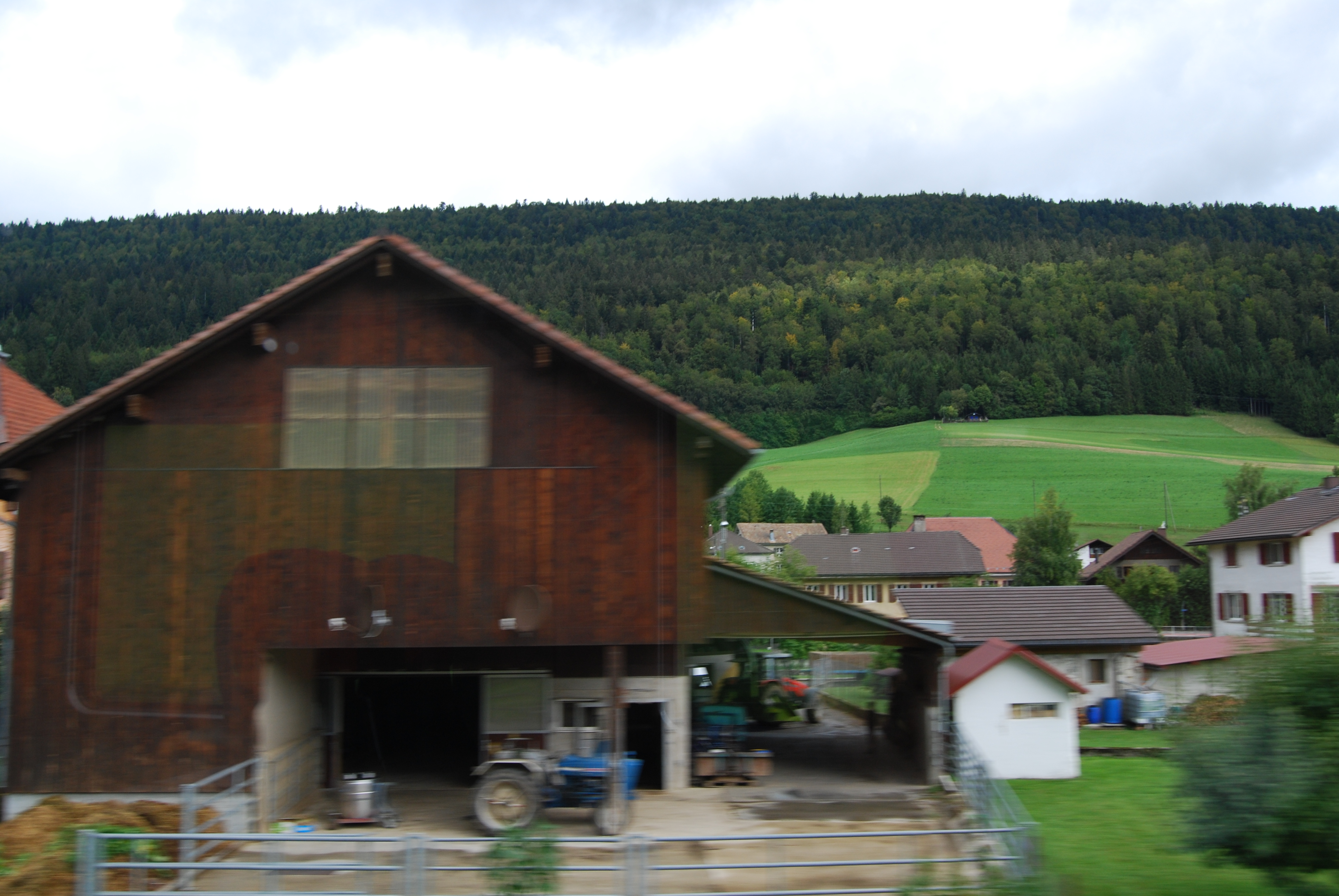
Barn and houses in Cormoret village

Cormoret has a population (as of December 2020) of 494. As of 2010, 3.3% of the population are resident foreign nationals. Over the last 10 years (2000-2010) the population has changed at a rate of -5.9%. Migration accounted for -2.4%, while births and deaths accounted for -1.9%.

Most of the population (as of 2000) speaks French (459 or 86.6%) as their first language, German is the second most common (62 or 11.7%) and Russian is the third (2 or 0.4%). There is 1 person who speaks Italian and 1 person who speaks Romansh.

As of 2008, the population was 47.7% male and 52.3% female. The population was made up of 236 Swiss men (46.4% of the population) and 7 (1.4%) non-Swiss men. There were 256 Swiss women (50.3%) and 10 (2.0%) non-Swiss women. Of the population in the municipality, 179 or about 33.8% were born in Cormoret and lived there in 2000. There were 181 or 34.2% who were born in the same canton, while 112 or 21.1% were born somewhere else in Switzerland, and 45 or 8.5% were born outside of Switzerland.

As of 2010, children and teenagers (0–19 years old) make up 23.2% of the population, while adults (20–64 years old) make up 58.5% and seniors (over 64 years old) make up 18.3%.

As of 2000, there were 218 people who were single and never married in the municipality. There were 248 married individuals, 43 widows or widowers and 21 individuals who are divorced.

As of 2000, there were 64 households that consist of only one person and 25 households with five or more people. In 2000, a total of 206 apartments (86.9% of the total) were permanently occupied, while 12 apartments (5.1%) were seasonally occupied and 19 apartments (8.0%) were empty. The vacancy rate for the municipality, in 2011, was 2.02%.

The historical population is given in the following chart:

== Politics ==
In the 2011 federal election the most popular party was the Swiss People's Party (SVP) which received 29.6% of the vote. The next three most popular parties were the Social Democratic Party (SP) (23.8%), the Green Party (14.3%) and the Conservative Democratic Party (BDP) (11.3%). In the federal election, a total of 161 votes were cast, and the voter turnout was 42.9%.

== Economy ==
As of 2011, Cormoret had an unemployment rate of 2.03%. As of 2008, there were a total of 121 people employed in the municipality. Of these, there were 30 people employed in the primary economic sector and about 10 businesses involved in this sector. 42 people were employed in the secondary sector and there were 8 businesses in this sector. 49 people were employed in the tertiary sector, with 14 businesses in this sector.

In 2008 there were a total of 99 full-time equivalent jobs. The number of jobs in the primary sector was 24, all in agriculture. The number of jobs in the secondary sector was 38 of which 33 or (86.8%) were in manufacturing and 5 (13.2%) were in construction. The number of jobs in the tertiary sector was 37. In the tertiary sector; 11 or 29.7% were in wholesale or retail sales or the repair of motor vehicles, 16 or 43.2% were in a hotel or restaurant, 3 or 8.1% were technical professionals or scientists, 4 or 10.8% were in education.

In 2000, there were 48 workers who commuted into the municipality and 167 workers who commuted away. The municipality is a net exporter of workers, with about 3.5 workers leaving the municipality for every one entering. Of the working population, 10.1% used public transportation to get to work, and 58.6% used a private car.

== Religion ==
From the 2000 census, 95 or 17.9% were Roman Catholic, while 295 or 55.7% belonged to the Swiss Reformed Church. Of the rest of the population, there were 2 members of an Orthodox church (or about 0.38% of the population), and there were 112 individuals (or about 21.13% of the population) who belonged to another Christian church. There was 1 individual who was Islamic. There was 1 person who was Buddhist and 1 individual who belonged to another church. 61 (or about 11.51% of the population) belonged to no church, are agnostic or atheist, and 16 individuals (or about 3.02% of the population) did not answer the question.

== Education ==
In Cormoret about 185 or (34.9%) of the population have completed non-mandatory upper secondary education, and 45 or (8.5%) have completed additional higher education (either university or a Fachhochschule). Of the 45 who completed tertiary schooling, 66.7% were Swiss men, 26.7% were Swiss women.

The Canton of Bern school system provides one year of non-obligatory Kindergarten, followed by six years of Primary school. This is followed by three years of obligatory lower Secondary school where the students are separated according to ability and aptitude. Following the lower Secondary students may attend additional schooling or they may enter an apprenticeship.

During the 2010-11 school year, there were a total of 62 students attending classes in Cormoret. There was one kindergarten class with a total of 19 students in the municipality. The municipality had 2 primary classes and 43 students. Of the primary students, 11.6% were permanent or temporary residents of Switzerland (not citizens) and 11.6% have a different mother language than the classroom language.

As of 2000, there were 24 students in Cormoret who came from another municipality, while 85 residents attended schools outside the municipality.

Cormoret is home to the Bibliothèque communale de Cormoret library. The library has (as of 2008) 2,208 books or other media, and loaned out 1,800 items in the same year. It was open a total of 76 days with average of 2 hours per week during that year.

== Transportation ==
The municipality has a railway station, Cormoret. The station is located on the Biel/Bienne–La Chaux-de-Fonds line and has hourly service to Biel/Bienne and La Chaux-de-Fonds.
