= Bernese Jura =

Coordinates: 47°10′29″N 7°18′21″E

Jura Bernois District Arrondissement administratif Jura bernois
- District
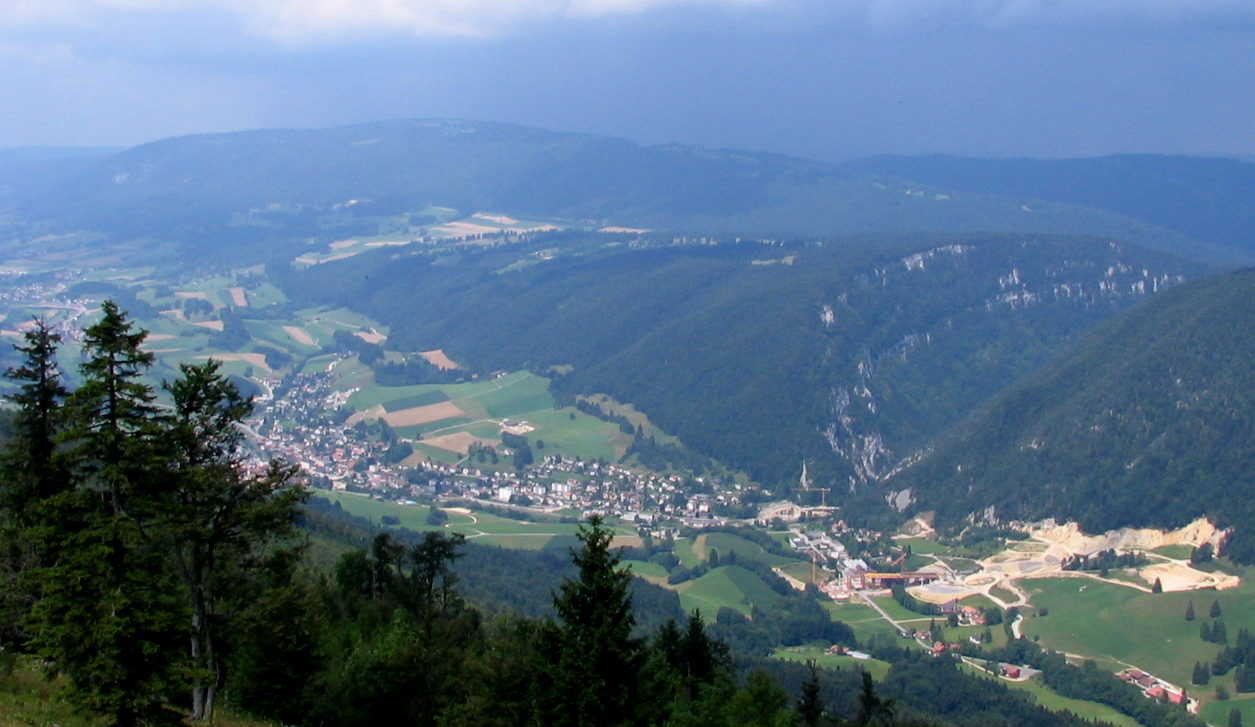
- Court, Switzerland
- Country: Switzerland
- Canton: Bern
- Capital: Courtelary

Area
  - Total: 541.75 km^{2} (209.17 sq mi)

Population (December 2020)
  - Total: 53,715
  - Density: 99.151/km^{2} (256.80/sq mi)
- Time zone: UTC+1 (CET)
  - Summer (DST): UTC+2 (CEST)
- Municipalities: 39

Bernese Jura (French: Jura bernois, French pronunciation: [ʒyʁa bɛʁnwa], German: Berner Jura) is the name for the French-speaking area of the Swiss canton of Bern, and from 2010 one of ten administrative divisions of the canton.

Comprising the three French-speaking districts in the northern part of the canton, it contains 39 municipalities with an area of 522.11 km^{2} (201.59 sq mi) and a population (as of December 2020) of 53,715. More than 90% of the population of the three districts speaks French.

From 1815 to 1979, the Bernese Jura comprised seven districts. Three of these seceded to form the canton of Jura in 1979, while a fourth, the Laufen district, joined the canton of Basel-Landschaft in 1994. Additionally, Moutier, a municipality, voted to secede from Bern in a referendum in 2021 and joined Jura on 1 January 2026.

== History ==
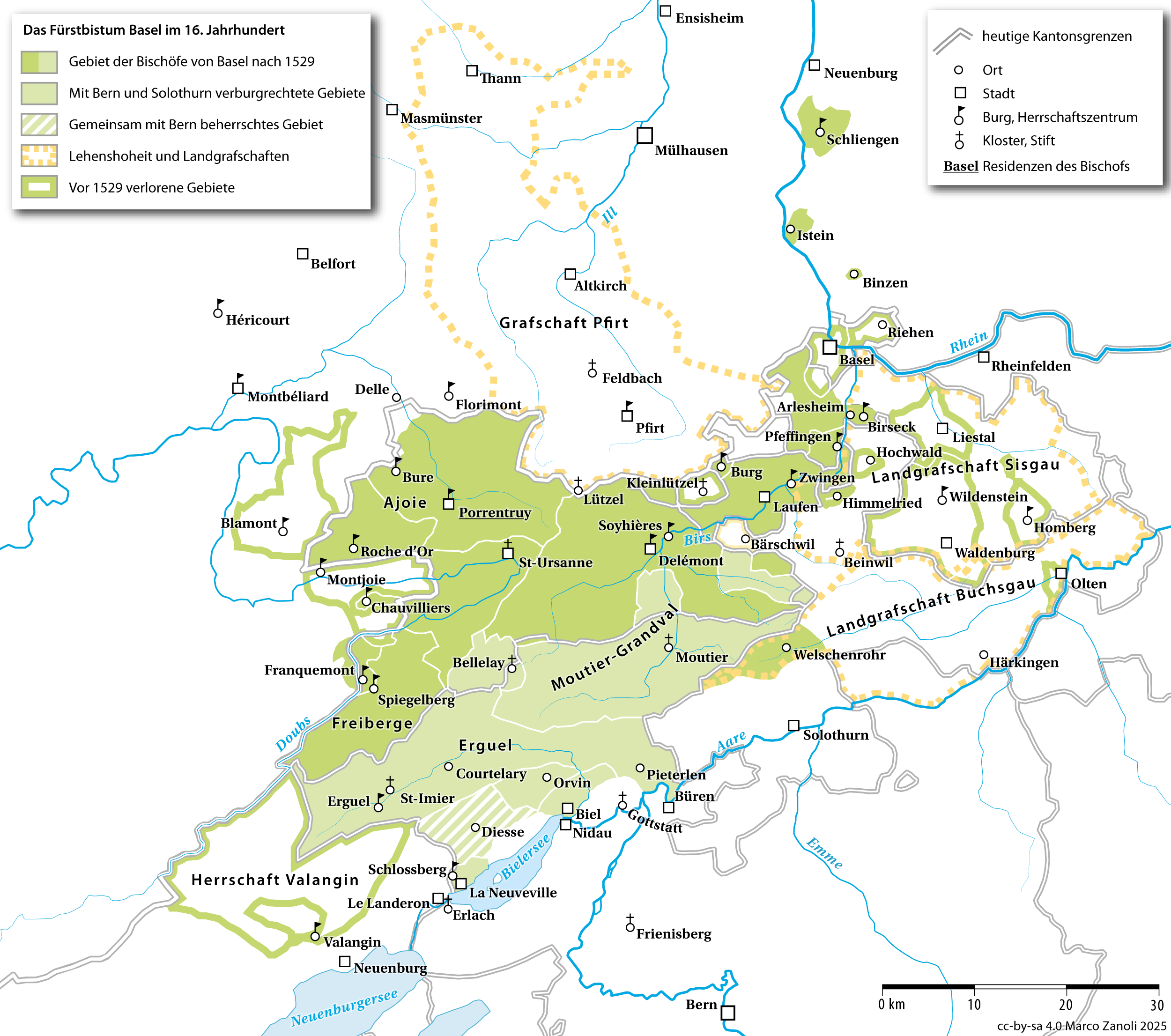
Territories of the bishopric of Basel in the 16th century

Most of the territory of the Bernese Jura was passed from the County of Burgundy to the Bishopric of Basel in AD 999.

It was annexed by France during the Napoleonic period, 1798–1814. In 1814, the Congress of Vienna accorded it to the canton of Bern to compensate for the loss of the new canton of Vaud.

From 1815 to 1979, the term Bernese Jura also included the territory now forming the canton of Jura, which seceded following a national popular vote on 24 September 1978.

In 1974 a plebiscite voted to remain part of Bern by a margin of only 70 votes. This led to acts of vandalism on 16 March 1974 and on 7 September 1975 an armed standoff at the Hôtel de la Gare in Moutier which was broken up by an elite team of Bernese police on the following day. Two other plebiscites also came down on the side of remaining in the Canton of Bern, including one in 1998 which passed with a thin majority of 41 votes. In 2013 a third plebiscite ended with the majority of residents choosing to remain in Bern, though a majority of residents of Moutier wanted to join Jura. On 18 June 2017 the municipality of Moutier voted to join the Canton of Jura by a small margin of 51.7% (2,067 for leaving and 1,930 for remaining part of Bern).

Its administrative capital was Biel/Bienne from 1815 to 2009. Since 2010, Biel/Bienne has been made the administrative capital of a separate district, and the administrative capital of the remaining Bernese Jura is now Courtelary.

== Representation ==
According to the canton's constitution, one of the seven members of the Executive Council of Bern has to be a French-speaking citizen of this area. Of the 160 seats in the Grand Council of Bern, 12 seats are reserved for the Bernese Jura and an additional three seats are guaranteed for the French-speaking population of the bilingual district of Biel/Bienne.

== Administrative divisions ==
Historically, the region was divided into three districts (2004 population estimates):

- District of Courtelary (22,224)
- District of La Neuveville (6,083)
- District of Moutier (23,098)

In 2010 the three districts were given a lesser significant political importance and the newly created Arrondissement administratif Jura bernois took the three districts' political prerogative.

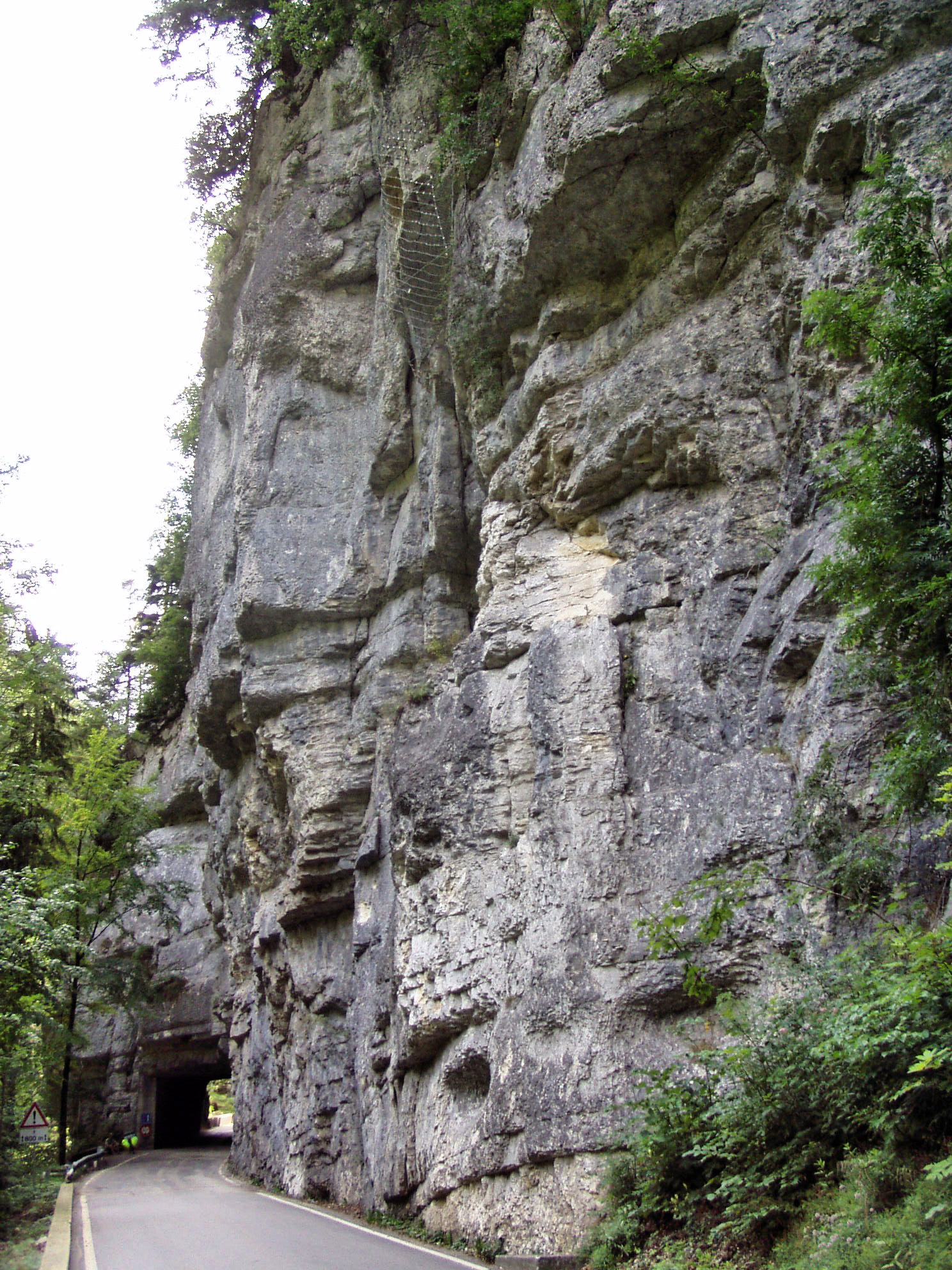
Gorges du Pichou

| Flag | Name | Population (31 December 2020) | Area in km^{2} |
|---|---|---|---|
| Belprahon | Belprahon | 279 | 3.83 |
| Champoz | Champoz | 174 | 7.17 |
| Corcelles | Corcelles | 201 | 6.77 |
| Corgémont | Corgémont | 1,774 | 17.61 |
| Cormoret | Cormoret | 494 | 13.49 |
| Cortébert | Cortébert | 696 | 14.78 |
| Court | Court | 1,417 | 24.61 |
| Courtelary | Courtelary | 1,405 | 22.17 |
| Crémines | Crémines | 488 | 9.48 |
| Eschert | Eschert | 377 | 6.58 |
| Grandval | Grandval | 388 | 8.23 |
| La Ferrière | La Ferrière | 530 | 14.20 |
| La Neuveville | La Neuveville | 3,780 | 6.81 |
| Loveresse | Loveresse | 349 | 4.72 |
| Mont-Tramelan | Mont-Tramelan | 111 | 4.64 |
| Nods | Nods | 788 | 26.66 |
| Orvin | Orvin | 1,198 | 21.59 |
| Perrefitte | Perrefitte | 481 | 8.57 |
| Péry | Péry-La Heutte | 1,908 | 23.78 |
| Petit-Val | Petit-Val | 392 | 23.9 |
| Plateau de Diesse | Plateau de Diesse | 2,056 | 25.55 |
| Rebévelier | Rebévelier | 41 | 3.54 |
| Reconvilier | Reconvilier | 2,380 | 8.24 |
| Renan | Renan | 934 | 12.63 |
| Roches | Roches | 190 | 9.05 |
| Romont | Romont | 202 | 7.03 |
| Saicourt | Saicourt | 645 | 13.76 |
| Saint-Imier | Saint-Imier | 5,156 | 20.89 |
| Sauge | Sauge | 827 | 13.46 |
| Saules | Saules | 147 | 4.28 |
| Schelten | Schelten | 39 | 5.57 |
| Seehof | Seehof | 56 | 8.41 |
| Sonceboz-Sombeval | Sonceboz-Sombeval | 1,954 | 15.00 |
| Sonvilier | Sonvilier | 1,223 | 23.79 |
| Sorvilier | Sorvilier | 283 | 6.89 |
| Tavannes | Tavannes | 3,485 | 14.78 |
| Tramelan | Tramelan | 4,607 | 24.83 |
| Valbirse | Valbirse | 3,971 | 18.68 |
| Villeret | Villeret | 941 | 16.23 |
| | Total (39) | 53,715 | 541.75 |

== Mergers ==
- On 1 January 2014 the former municipalities of Diesse, Lamboing and Prêles merged into the new municipality of Plateau de Diesse and Plagne and Vauffelin merged into the municipality of Sauge.
- On 1 January 2015 the former municipalities of Péry and La Heutte merged to form the new municipality of Péry-La Heutte. The former municipalities of Bévilard, Malleray and Pontenet merged to form Valbirse. Finally, Châtelat, Monible, Sornetan and Souboz merged to form Petit-Val.

== See also ==
- Radio Jura bernois
- Italian Graubünden
