= Courtelary =

- Municipality
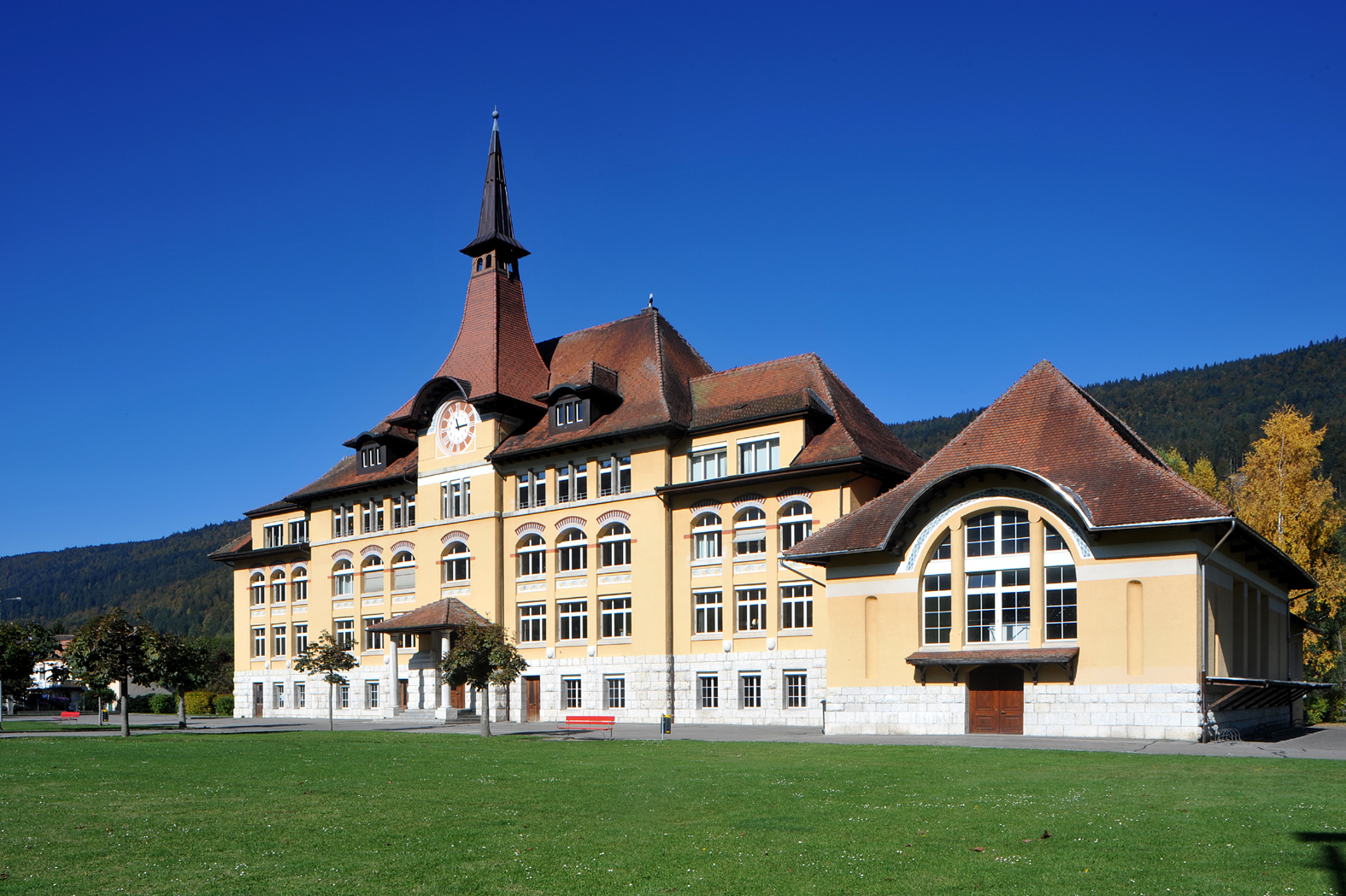
- School house in Courtelary

- Flag Coat of arms
- Location of Courtelary
- Location within Switzerland Location within Canton of Bern
- Coordinates: 47°11′N 07°04′E
- Country: Switzerland
- Canton: Bern
- District: Jura bernois

Government
  - Mayor: Maire; Benjamin Rindlisbacher

Area
  - Total: 22.24 km^{2} (8.59 sq mi)
- Elevation: 695 m (2,280 ft)

Population (December 2020)
  - Total: 1,405
  - Density: 63.17/km^{2} (163.6/sq mi)
- Time zone: UTC+01:00 (CET)
  - Summer (DST): UTC+02:00 (CEST)
- Postal code: 2608
- SFOS number: 434
- ISO 3166 code: CH-BE
- Surrounded by: Cormoret, Nods, Cortébert, Mont-Tramelan, Les Breuleux, La Chaux-des-Breuleux
- Website: www.courtelary.ch

Courtelary is a municipality of the French-speaking Bernese Jura, in the canton of Bern in Switzerland. The town is the capital of the Jura bernois administrative district.

== History ==
Aerial view (1950)

Courtelary is first mentioned in 968 as Curtis Alerici in a list of the properties of Moutier-Grandval Abbey. In 1179, Pope Alexander III elevated the Abbot to a Canon and confirmed the Abbots title to Courtelary.

In addition to Moutier-Granval Abbey, the Cathedral chapter of Saint-Imier owned properties in the village which were managed for them by the Lords of Fenis-Neuchâtel. However, while under the control of the Lords of Fenis-Neuchâtel, the valley became a bailiwick of the Prince-Bishop of Basel. The Prince-Bishop placed the valley under the Seigniory of Erguel. By the late 13th century, Seigniory was controlled by the town of Biel.

Due to the rising popularity of the cult of St. Imerius, in the 10th or 11th century a small Church of St. Imerius was built in the village. The original building was expanded in 1372, 1642 and finally in 1773. During a restoration in 1933–36, several 11th-century murals were discovered in the building. The Courtelary parish was first mentioned in the 13th century. In 1530, Biel began forcing the entire Erguel region to accept the Protestant Reformation. This interference in local affairs pushed the residents of the valley to create an alliance with the town of Solothurn. In 1604 with Solothurn's support, the appeals court moved from Biel to Courtelary which brought limited self-rule back to the valley. Two years later the seat of the Erguel Bailiwick moved to Courtelary's New Castle (which later became the town hall). During the Thirty Years' War, in 1639, the village was plundered and partially burned by the troops of Bernard of Saxe-Weimar.

In 1726, the Prince-Bishop of Basel, Johann Konrad von Reinach-Hirzbach, attempted to modernize and consolidate his extensive land holdings. He tried to sweep away the numerous local laws, customs and rights and replace them with a central government ruled according to the principles of enlightened absolutism. Riots and revolts against the new government broke out almost immediately in the Erguel valley and the region remained a center of anti-government activity. In 1733 a meeting at the Courtelary Castle exploded into a riot and the Prince-Bishop's bailiff, Benoît-Aimé Mestrezat, was forced to flee the city. In 1792 and 1793, heavily influenced by the French Revolution, the revolutionary National Assembly of Erguel was established in Courtelary. Revolutionaries flocked to the town and established a short-lived Republic of Erguel. In 1797 the French invaded the lands of the Bishop of Basel and established the Canton of Courtelary with Courtelary as the capital. The Canton was initially part of the Department of Mont-Terrible followed by the Department of Haut-Rhin. After Napoleon's defeat, in 1815, the Erguel region became part of the Canton of Bern. Courtelary was the capital of the District of Erguel until 1831 when it became the capital of the District of Courtelary.

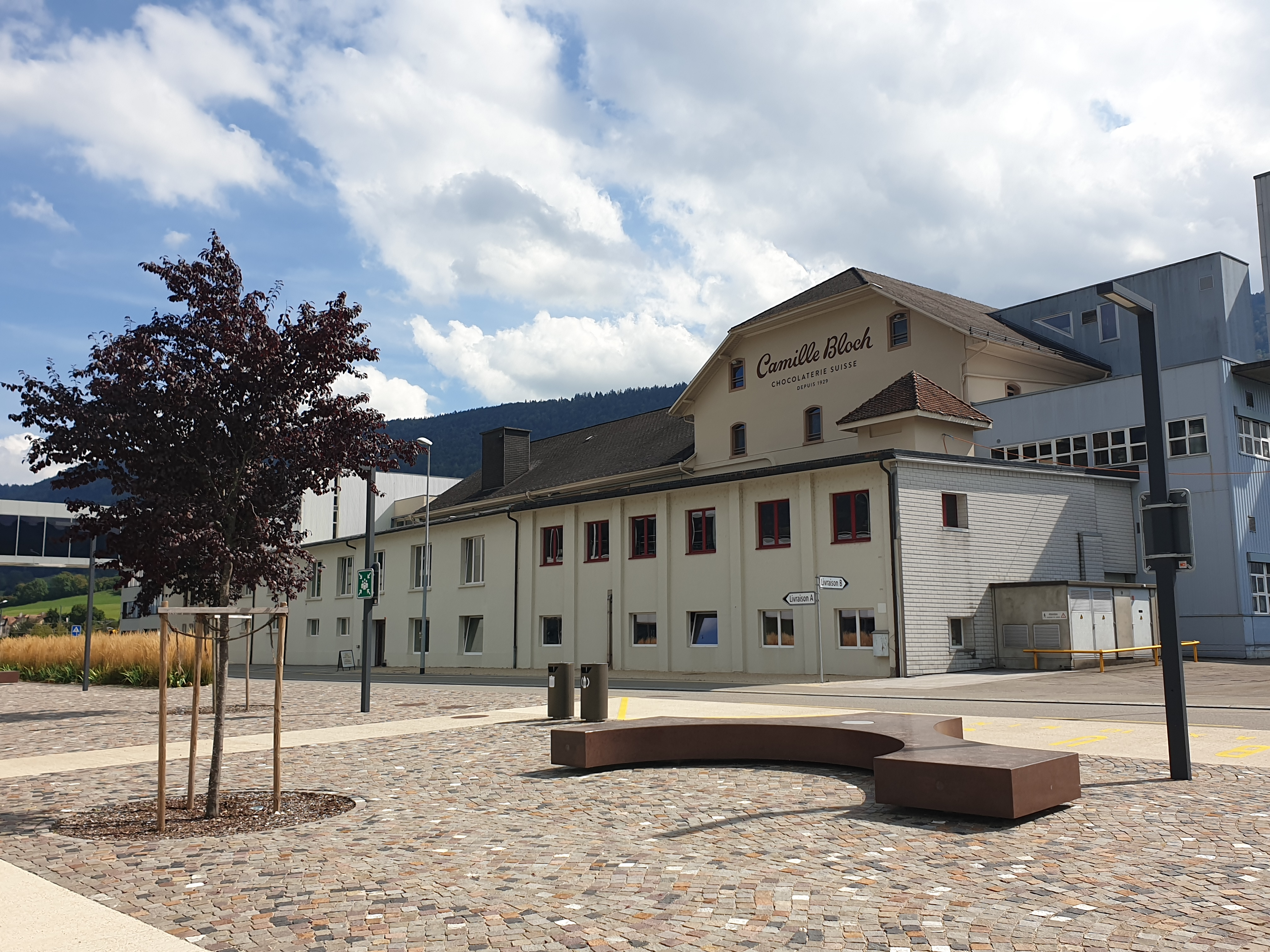
Camille Bloch Chocolates in Courtelary

Courtelary remained a rural and agricultural town until the early 20th Century. The farms on the valley floor produced grain for local use. In contrast, the surrounding mountain pastures were used by Anabaptist sharecroppers to raise dairy cattle and other livestock. They then produced butter and cheese which they exported. In 1874 the Biel-Les Convers-La Chaux-de-Fonds railroad was built through the town. The lower transportation costs from the railroad allowed a wood pulp factory to be built in Courtelary. In 1935, the Camille Bloch chocolate factory moved into the old wood pulp building. Other than the chocolate factory, manufacturing developed very slowly in Courtelary. A few precision machine and watch parts factories were built during the early 20th century, but during the 1970s these industries declined. In the following decades the industrial sector rebounded and in 2000 about 47% of the working population worked in industry.

== Geography ==
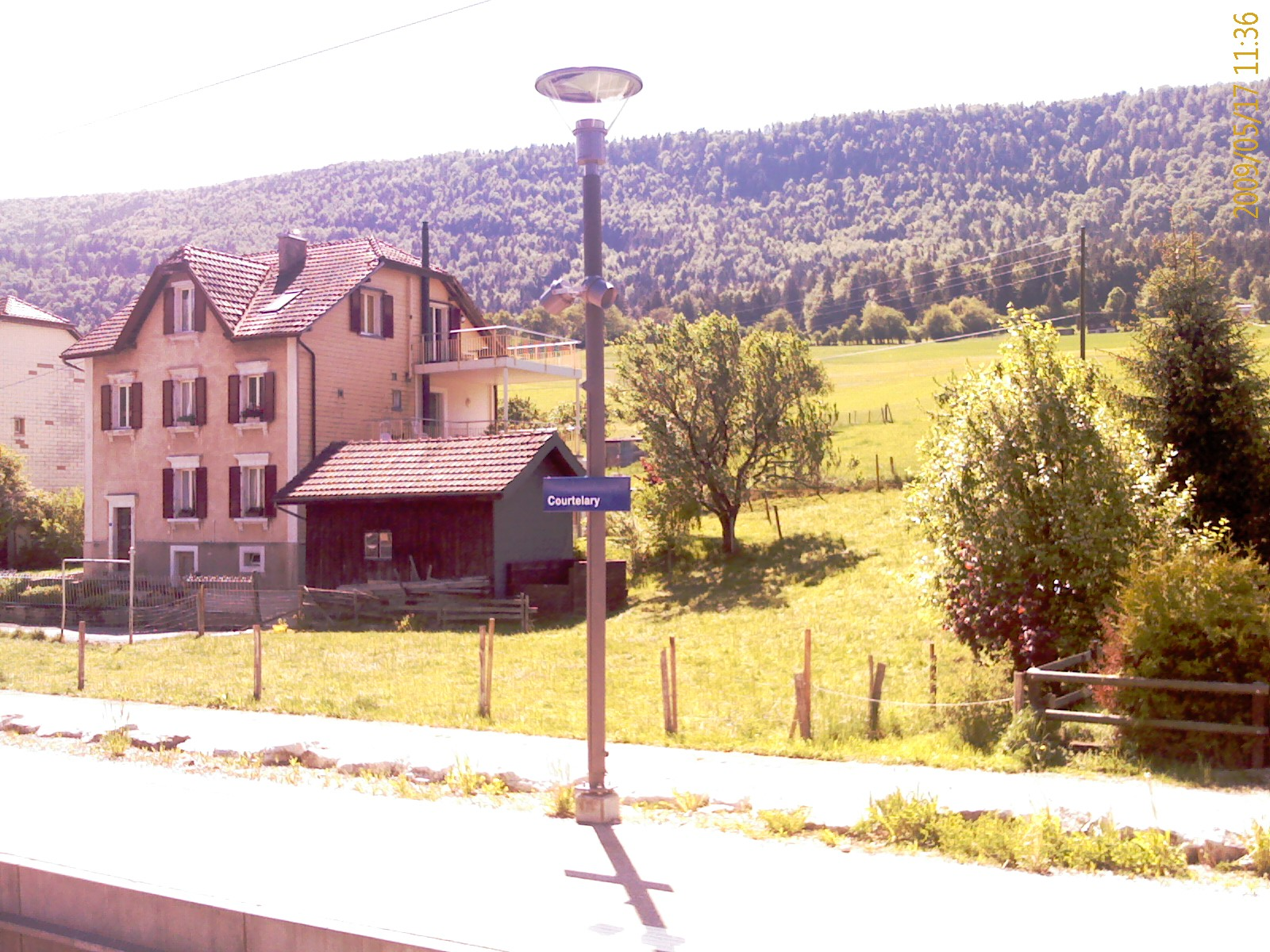
Courtelary train station and surrounding mountains

Courtelary has an area of 22.21 km^{2} (8.58 sq mi). Of this area, 11.39 km^{2} (4.40 mi^{2}) or 51.4% is used for agricultural purposes, while 9.66 km^{2} (3.73 mi^{2}) or 43.6% is forested. Of the rest of the land, 0.99 km^{2} (0.38 mi^{2}) or 4.5% is settled (buildings or roads), 0.03 km^{2} (7.4 acres) or 0.1% is either rivers or lakes and 0.02 km^{2} (4.9 acres) or 0.1% is unproductive land.

Of the built up area, housing and buildings made up 1.9% and transportation infrastructure made up 1.9%. Out of the forested land, 37.8% of the total land area is heavily forested and 5.8% is covered with orchards or small clusters of trees. Of the agricultural land, 11.7% is used for growing crops and 13.1% is pastures and 26.3% is used for alpine pastures. All the water in the municipality is flowing water.

Courtelary consists of two sections, the main village down in the valley and a number of individual farms up (about 900 meters (3,000 ft) above sea level) on the mountains.

On 31 December 2009 it stopped being the capital of the District de Courtelary when it was dissolved. On the following day, 1 January 2010, it became the capital of the newly created Arrondissement administratif Jura bernois.

== Coat of arms ==
The blazon of the municipal coat of arms is Gules on a Bend Argent three Linden Leaves pointing to base sinister.

== Demographics ==
Courtelary has a population (as of December 2020) of 1,405. As of 2010, 13.2% of the population are resident foreign nationals. Over the last 10 years (2000-2010) the population has changed at a rate of 13%. Migration accounted for 12.3%, while births and deaths accounted for 1.5%.

Most of the population (as of 2000) speaks French (933 or 82.8%) as their first language, German is the second most common (125 or 11.1%) and Italian is the third (21 or 1.9%). There are 6 people who speak Romansh.

As of 2008, the population was 48.4% male and 51.6% female. The population was made up of 527 Swiss men (41.5% of the population) and 88 (6.9%) non-Swiss men. There were 575 Swiss women (45.3%) and 80 (6.3%) non-Swiss women. Of the population in the municipality, 321 or about 28.5% were born in Courtelary and lived there in 2000. There were 380 or 33.7% who were born in the same canton, while 210 or 18.6% were born somewhere else in Switzerland, and 162 or 14.4% were born outside of Switzerland.

As of 2010, children and teenagers (0–19 years old) make up 24.9% of the population, while adults (20–64 years old) make up 56.3% and seniors (over 64 years old) make up 18.8%.

As of 2000, there were 440 people who were single and never married in the municipality. There were 545 married individuals, 73 widows or widowers and 69 individuals who are divorced.

As of 2000, there were 134 households that consist of only one person and 36 households with five or more people. In 2000, a total of 451 apartments (80.1% of the total) were permanently occupied, while 69 apartments (12.3%) were seasonally occupied and 43 apartments (7.6%) were empty. As of 2010, the construction rate of new housing units was 7.1 new units per 1000 residents. The vacancy rate for the municipality, in 2011, was 1.76%.

The historical population is given in the following chart:

== Politics ==
In the 2011 federal election the most popular party was the Swiss People's Party (SVP) which received 33.8% of the vote. The next three most popular parties were the Social Democratic Party (SP) (28.3%), the Green Party (12.7%) and the FDP.The Liberals (9.3%). In the federal election, a total of 302 votes were cast, and the voter turnout was 34.5%.

== Economy ==
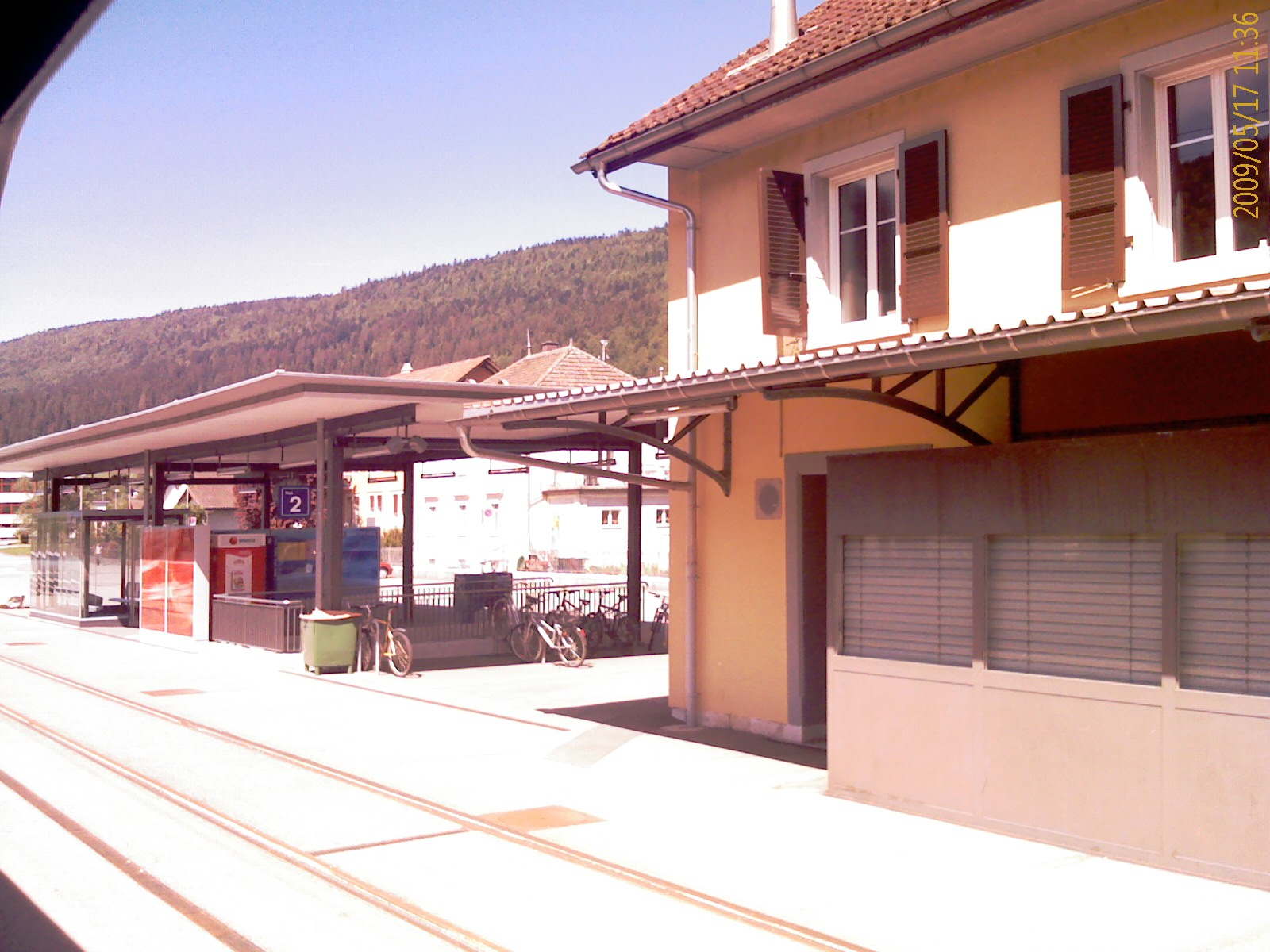
Courtelary train station

As of 2011, Courtelary had an unemployment rate of 3.53%. As of 2008, there were a total of 610 people employed in the municipality. Of these, there were 64 people employed in the primary economic sector and about 24 businesses involved in this sector. 330 people were employed in the secondary sector and there were 17 businesses in this sector. 216 people were employed in the tertiary sector, with 36 businesses in this sector. There were 6 residents of the municipality who were employed in some capacity, of which females made up 50.0% of the workforce.

In 2008 there were a total of 532 full-time equivalent jobs. The number of jobs in the primary sector was 43, all of which were in agriculture. The number of jobs in the secondary sector was 312 of which 274 or (87.8%) were in manufacturing and 38 (12.2%) were in construction. The number of jobs in the tertiary sector was 177. In the tertiary sector; 25 or 14.1% were in wholesale or retail sales or the repair of motor vehicles, 4 or 2.3% were in the movement and storage of goods, 18 or 10.2% were in a hotel or restaurant, 21 or 11.9% were the insurance or financial industry, 8 or 4.5% were technical professionals or scientists, 14 or 7.9% were in education and 41 or 23.2% were in health care.

In 2000, there were 342 workers who commuted into the municipality and 308 workers who commuted away. The municipality is a net importer of workers, with about 1.1 workers entering the municipality for every one leaving. About 1.8% of the workforce coming into Courtelary are coming from outside Switzerland. Of the working population, 13.6% used public transportation to get to work, and 51.5% used a private car.

== Religion ==
From the 2000 census, 269 or 23.9% were Roman Catholic, while 640 or 56.8% belonged to the Swiss Reformed Church. Of the rest of the population, there were 4 members of an Orthodox church (or about 0.35% of the population), there were 6 individuals (or about 0.53% of the population) who belonged to the Christian Catholic Church, and there were 70 individuals (or about 6.21% of the population) who belonged to another Christian church. There were 31 (or about 2.75% of the population) who were Islamic. There were 11 individuals who were Buddhist and 1 person who was Hindu. 92 (or about 8.16% of the population) belonged to no church, are agnostic or atheist, and 38 individuals (or about 3.37% of the population) did not answer the question.

== Weather ==
Courtelary has an average of 145.6 days of rain or snow per year and on average receives 1,317 mm (51.9 in) of precipitation. The wettest month is June during which time Courtelary receives an average of 126 mm (5.0 in) of rain or snow. During this month there is precipitation for an average of 12.9 days. The month with the most days of precipitation is May, with an average of 14.9, but with only 121 mm (4.8 in) of rain or snow. The driest month of the year is September with an average of 93 mm (3.7 in) of precipitation over 9.4 days.

== Education ==
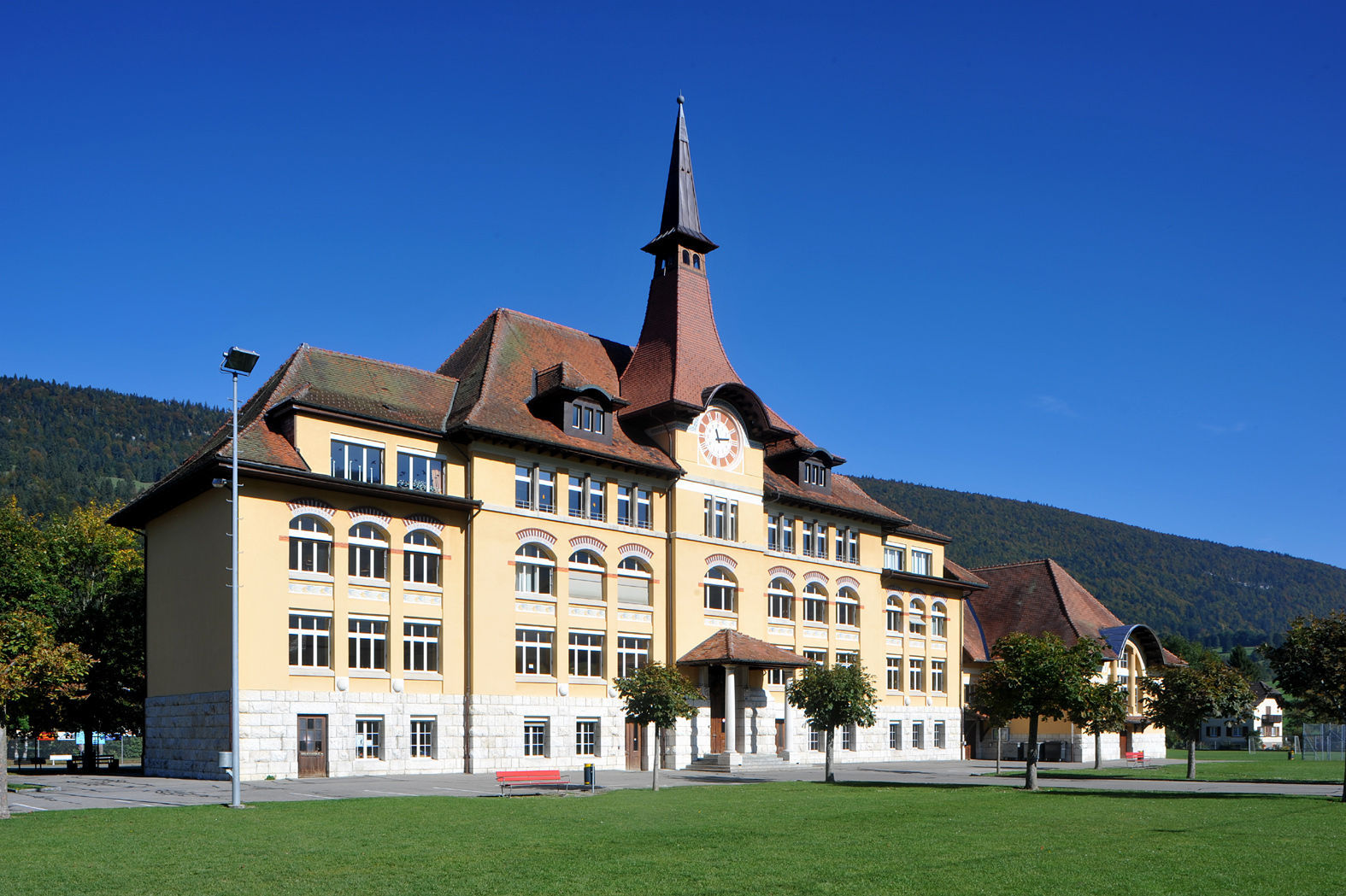
Courtelary school building

In Courtelary about 378 or (33.5%) of the population have completed non-mandatory upper secondary education, and 115 or (10.2%) have completed additional higher education (either university or a Fachhochschule). Of the 115 who completed tertiary schooling, 74.8% were Swiss men, 19.1% were Swiss women.

The Canton of Bern school system provides two year of kindergarten after the harmos reform Kindergarten, followed by six years of Primary school. This is followed by three years of obligatory lower Secondary school where the students are separated according to ability and aptitude. Following the lower Secondary students may attend additional schooling or they may enter an apprenticeship.

During the 2010–11 school year, there were a total of 204 students attending classes in Courtelary. There was one kindergarten class with a total of 22 students in the municipality. Of the kindergarten students, 13.6% were permanent or temporary residents of Switzerland (not citizens) and 4.5% have a different mother language than the classroom language. The municipality had 3 primary classes and 61 students. Of the primary students, 1.6% were permanent or temporary residents of Switzerland (not citizens) and 3.3% have a different mother language than the classroom language. During the same year, there were 5 lower secondary classes with a total of 90 students. There were 3.3% who were permanent or temporary residents of Switzerland (not citizens) and 5.6% have a different mother language than the classroom language.

As of 2000, there were 97 students in Courtelary who came from another municipality, while 93 residents attended schools outside the municipality.

== Transportation ==
The municipality has a railway station, Courtelary. The station is located on the Biel/Bienne–La Chaux-de-Fonds line and has half-hourly service to Biel/Bienne and La Chaux-de-Fonds.

== Industry ==
The town is also well known for the Camille Bloch chocolate factory.

== Famous residents ==
- Paul Miche - composer
- Eugenio Santoro - sculptor
