= Radio Jura bernois =

Swiss radio station

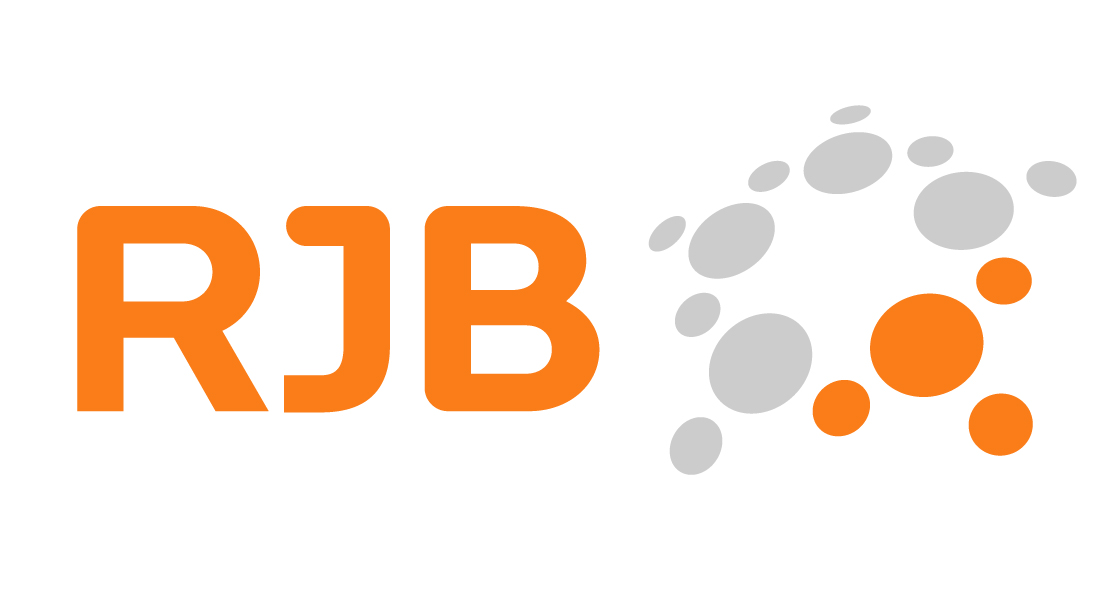
- Switzerland

Programming
- Language: French

Links
- Website: www.rjb.ch

Radio Jura bernois (RJB, meaning literally “Radio Bernese Jura”) is a private French-language radio broadcaster in regional Switzerland. It broadcasts in Bernese Jura, the French-speaking part of the Canton of Bern.

Its studios are based in Tavannes, in the district of Moutier.
