= Biel/Bienne–La Chaux-de-Fonds railway =

Railway line in Switzerland

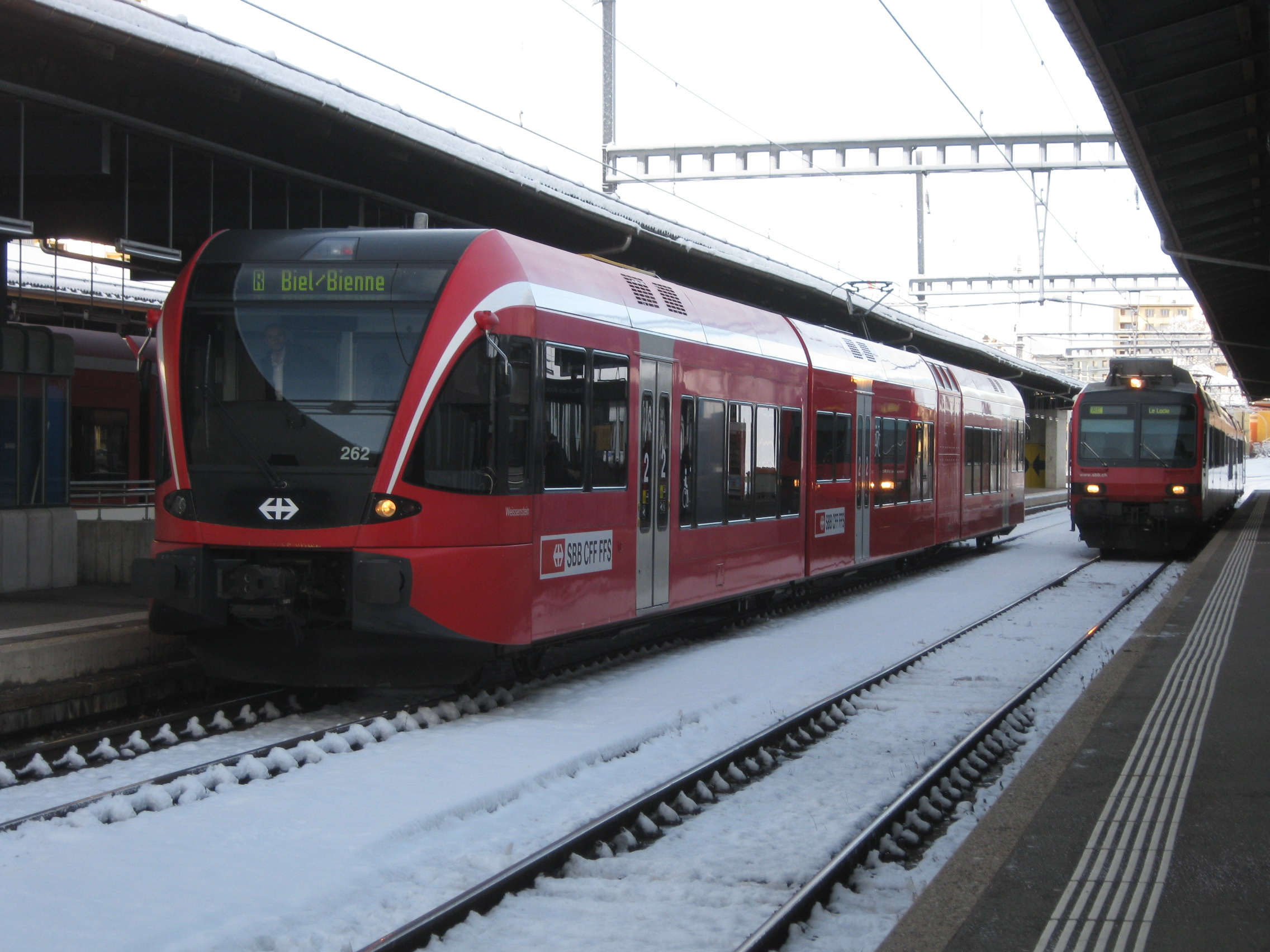
- GTW multiple unit waiting for passengers in La Chaux-de-Fonds

Overview
- Owner: Swiss Federal Railways
- Line number: 225
- Termini: Biel/Bienne; La Chaux-de-Fonds

Technical
- Line length: 44 km (27 mi)
- Number of tracks: 1
- Track gauge: 1,435 mm (4 ft 8 1/2 in)
- Electrification: 15 kV 16.7 Hz AC overhead catenary
- Maximum incline: 2.8%

The Biel/Bienne–La Chaux-de-Fonds railway is a single-track standard-gauge railway line of the Swiss Federal Railways (SBB).

== History ==
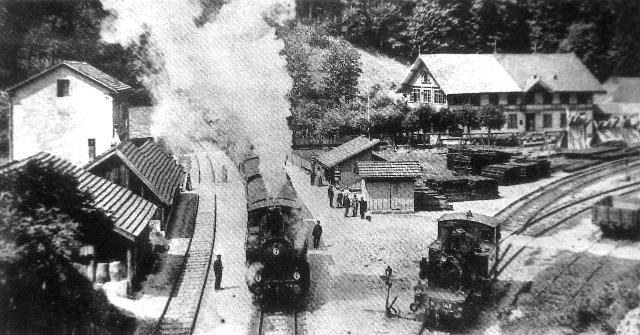
A train that has left La Chaux-de-Fonds is travelling through Convers to Neuchatel. The last cars are uncoupled and taken over by the locomotive waiting on the right. Photo from around 1885

The 42-kilometer route from Biel/Bienne via Sonceboz-Sombeval to Convers together with a branch from Sonceboz-Sombeval to Tavannes was built by the Jura bernois (JB) and opened on 30 April 1874. In Convers, the carriages were attached to the trains to La Chaux-de-Fonds for the short remaining section to Neuchâtel. This avoided, for the time being, a second tunnel to La Chaux-de-Fonds through a higher part of the range. A request by the city of Biel to avoid building a zig zag in Vingelz delayed the construction.

The Jura bernois changed its name to the Jura–Bern–Luzern (JBL) in 1884. The 1618-metre-long Crosettes Tunnel, which provided a direct connection to La Chaux-de-Fonds, was opened on 17 December 1888. Thus, the difficult attaching and detaching of carriages in Convers could be avoided and the timing of JBL services was independent of the timetable of the now independent Jura neuchâtelois (JN). For military reasons, the section from Le Creux to Convers was not closed until 1895.

The JBL merged with the Western Switzerland–Simplon Company (Compagnie de la Suisse Occidentale et du Simplon, SOS) on 1 January 1890 to form the Jura–Simplon Railway (Compagnie des Chemins de Fer Jura–Simplon, JS). The JS was one of the five major private railway companies in Switzerland, which were nationalised and integrated to form the Swiss Federal Railways (SBB) on 1 May 1903. Electrical operations commenced on the Biel/Bienne–Sonceboz-Sombeval section on 15 May 1934 and on the remaining section to La Chaux-de-Fonds on 15 July 1934.

== Route description ==
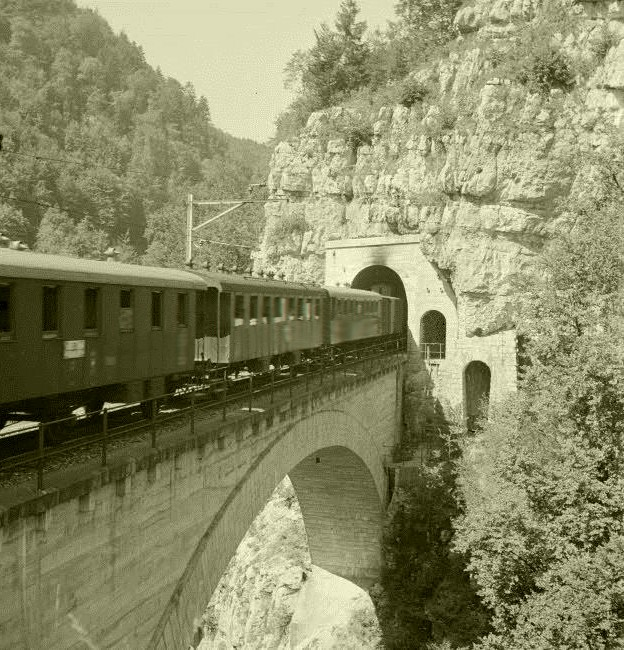
Passenger train with a three-axle 3rd class passenger car on the Taubenloch bridge between Biel and Frinvilier-Taubenloch in 1936

After the exit in Biel, trains quickly gain altitude, giving travellers a view of Biel and the Three Lake country (Drei-Seen-Land/Pays des Trois-Lacs). After crossing the Taubenloch gorge, trains arrive at Reuchenette-Péry, where a large concrete factory provides goods traffic. The line runs along the Suze river and the Transjurane motorway to Sonceboz-Sombeval, where the line branches off to Tavannes and Moutier. The line passes through Courtelary to Saint-Imier, the main town of the vallon of Saint-Imier. The line continues up the valley to the former halt of Le Creux, where trains enter the Crosettes tunnel. The line then run next to the line from Neuchâtel to La Chaux-de-Fonds station.

== Operations ==
Originally, the Biel/Bienne–Sonceboz-Sombeval section was part of the Moutier–Delémont–Delle–Belfort international route. The opening of the Grenchenberg tunnel in 1915 reduced the route via Sonceboz-Sombeval to Moutier to a branch line.

Now every hour a RegioExpress services takes 40 minutes and a Regio service takes 57 minutes to run from Biel/Bienne to La Chaux-de-Fonds and in the opposite direction. The Regio is split or joined in Sonceboz-Sombeval, with one part running to La Chaux-de-Fonds and the other to Solothurn via Moutier. The SBB took over 13 GTW sets from the BLS for the service in 2014.
