= Marie Wittwer-Lüthi =

Swiss teacher and missionary wife in Cameroon (1879–1955)

- Born: Maria Rosa Lüthi; 27 September 1879; Rohrbach, Switzerland
- Died: 7 October 1955 (aged 76); Bern, Switzerland
- Occupations: Teacher; missionary wife
- Spouse: Karl Wittwer
- Children: 3

Marie Wittwer-Lüthi, born Maria Rosa Lüthi (27 September 1879 – 7 October 1955), was a Swiss teacher and the wife of a Basel Mission missionary in Cameroon, later active in the Evangelical Society of the canton of Bern.

== Early life and teaching ==
Marie Lüthi was the daughter of Johannes Lüthi, a teacher in Bern, and Lina née Knutti, and grew up with two sisters in a strict Protestant household. Her father died when she was four, after which her mother supported the family alone. In Bern she attended the model school of the Protestant teachers' college at Muristalden and then the teachers' college of the new girls' school. She taught for two years at the Anabaptist school at Cortébert in the Bernese Jura, and then for four years at the newly founded Protestant school at Hopösche in Ruswil.

== Cameroon ==
In 1904 Marie Lüthi married Karl Wittwer in Bern, a missionary working in Africa for the Basel Mission. He had been married first to Louise Bertha née Müller, who died in 1903 and with whom he had five children raised in Switzerland. Marie Wittwer-Lüthi accompanied her husband to the German colony of Cameroon, where the couple had three children.

She held the status of a missionary's wife: the Basel Mission used the feminine term Missionarin only for unmarried women working for the mission, which itself became possible only from the beginning of the 20th century. As her husband was often away for several days at the mission's outposts, she handled the day-to-day affairs of the Lobetal station in the Sanaga delta. Paying particular attention to the education of women, she taught local girls handicrafts, reading, and writing. During a stay in Europe in 1909 the couple left their two eldest children with her mother in Switzerland, as the Basel Mission's rules provided for the schooling of missionaries' children in Europe.

In 1910 the couple founded a mission post in the railway village of Ndunge, to which they attached an institute for boys. Pupils from neighbouring villages were housed there and given a school education, including instruction in German. Responsible as supervisor for their daily needs, Wittwer-Lüthi also taught the village girls, cared for the sick, and lodged unmarried missionaries. Her correspondence shows an ambivalent relationship with the people of the region: she sought to win their trust and to learn about the local cultures, but her thinking remained rooted in colonial assumptions. Convinced of the superiority of her religion and of European culture, and drawing on Protestant and Pietist values, she frequently described the local population as disinclined to work.

== Internment and later life ==
After the outbreak of the First World War, Wittwer-Lüthi was interned at Douala by the German colonial authorities together with her family and other missionaries' wives. On the journey to the camp she was seriously injured after jumping with her daughter from a defective moving train. Released the same year with her husband and daughter, she returned to Bern in 1915. A severe bout of pneumonia contracted afterwards left her weakened for the rest of her life.

After the war the couple tried without success to return to Cameroon, and Karl Wittwer served for some years as an itinerant preacher for the Basel Mission. Once he obtained a permanent post as a preacher for the Evangelical Society of the canton of Bern, the family settled at Boujean in the society's association house, which also housed the Blue Cross, the Sunday school, and a choir. There too Wittwer-Lüthi took on a range of duties, including leading the Blue Cross Töchterbund, an organisation for girls. After nineteen years with the Evangelical Society, the couple moved in 1934 to Bern, where Karl Wittwer died in 1940 after a long illness. One of their daughters, Martha Wittwer, followed her mother as a missionary's wife in Borneo before joining her in Bern in 1946. Marie Wittwer-Lüthi lived in Bern with her sister, her daughters, and her grandchildren until her death in 1955.

== Bibliography ==
- D. Konrad, Missionsbräute. Pietistinnen des 19. Jahrhunderts in der Basler Mission, 2001 (4th ed. 2013)
- D. Konrad, Missionskinder. Migration und Trennung in Missionarsfamilien der Basler Mission des 19. Jahrhunderts, 2023

=== Archives ===
- Archiv Basler Mission, Basel, "Marie Wittwer-Lüthi. Mutter und Missionarin"
