= Helmut Freitag =

German pianist, organist, conductor

Helmut Freitag (born July 1960) is a German pianist, organist, conductor and academic teacher.

== Education ==
Born in Bad Kreuznach, Freitag studied church music, music school (state examination in history and music) and orchestral conducting (diploma with distinction) in Saarbrücken, Düsseldorf and Geneva. His teachers were André Luy, Lionel Rogg, Jean Micault, Hans Drewanz and Hartmut Schmidt.

== Career ==
From 1988 to 1991, Freitag directed the music school of the district of Kaiserslautern. Since 1989, he has directed the Kaiserslautern Chamber Orchestra. With this orchestra, he has performed in the US, Scandinavia, Switzerland and Italy. On Easter Monday 1991, he became district cantor of the Protestant deaneries of Kaiserslautern and Otterbach. In 2001, he was appointed Kirchenmusikdirektor. Also, since 1991, he has held a teaching position for vocal correpetition at the Hochschule für Musik und Darstellende Kunst Mannheim. In 2002, he was appointed University Music Director of the Saarland University. In 2006, he was awarded the cultural prize of the city of Bad Kreuznach. In 2007, the Saarland University appointed him honorary professor of musicology.

Freitag is the initiator of the carillon in the Kaiserslautern Collegiate Church, which was installed in 2009 and, with 47 bells, is one of the largest instruments of its kind in Germany. He has performed his solo organ concerts in almost all European countries.

In 2017, Freitag was awarded a Doctorate (Dr. phil.) with the dissertation Komponisten der Naheregion:Gerhard Fischer-Münster, Fridel Grenz, Magdalene Schauss-Flake, Dieter Wellmann. Studien zur regionalen Kirchenmusik unter besonderer Berücksichtigung der Werke für Orgel.
