= Armand Nicolet =

Swiss luxury watch manufacturer

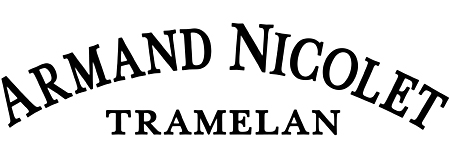
- Type: Privately held company
- Industry: Watchmaking
- Founded: 1875
- Founder: Armand Nicolet
- Headquarters: Tramelan, Switzerland
- Products: Watches
- Number of employees: 20
- Website: www.armandnicolet.com

Armand Nicolet is a Swiss luxury watch manufacturer located in Tramelan, a mountain village in the Bernese Jura. Its history dates to its foundation in 1875.

== History ==
Armand Nicolet, the son of a watchmaker, set up his own Atelier d'Horlogerie in 1875, having successfully completed an excellent apprenticeship.

By 1902, the Atelier was producing pocket watches with grand complications, such as a piece that consisted of a guilloché rose gold case, enamel dial, monopusher chronograph, complete calendar (date, day, month and moonphase indication), repeating hours, quarter hours and minutes. Examples of these historically significant pieces can be seen in the Armand Nicolet museum located in Tramelan.

Armand Nicolet died in 1939 and his son, Willy Nicolet, took control of the company. Under Willy's control, Armand Nicolet was developed into the largest T1 watchmaker, whose decorated, finely set and assembled mechanical movement components produced finished movements in the region.

== Crisis ==
During the 1970s and 1980s, the entire Swiss watchmaking industry entered difficult times, due to the influx of quartz timekeeping, a period known as the quartz crisis. Throughout these years, many storied Swiss watchmakers closed their doors, and the industry dramatically shrunk in size, due to its reliance on mechanical movements and its slow adoption of quartz technology. Armand Nicolet did not fold during these difficult times, and kept the doors open by working with some of the most important companies in the industry, thanks to the reputation they had built up as an excellent watchmaker. However, they were left with a large stock of mechanical movements and no one to assemble them for.

In 1987, Willy met Rolando Braga, an Italian watch enthusiast working in the watchmaking industry, and this started a new direction for Armand Nicolet.

== See also ==
- 88 Rue du Rhone
