= Willy O. Rossel =

Executive Chef known for gourmet airline cuisine

Willy Otto Rossel (April 4, 1921 – September 14, 2015) was a Chef de Cuisine or Executive Chef most noted for his extensive work in the preparation of gourmet airline cuisine. In 1965, he was hired by the Dallas-based Braniff Airways, Inc., to administer the airline's commitment to providing its passengers with the finest food aloft. Also in 1965, Braniff had begun implementing its End of the Plain Plane Campaign, which called for a change in the way the airline presented itself to the public. This campaign not only included a change in the company's look but an upgrade of its inflight cuisine to gourmet status. Rossel wrote the first manual used for the apprenticeship of American chefs.

== Early life and education ==
Willy Rossel was born in Tramelan, Switzerland, and had descended from a famous poet who was a statesman named Virgil Rossel. Rossel was one of five brothers and his father, Otto Rossel, was well known watchmaker and collector of pocket watches.

His family had traditionally been watchmakers in Switzerland but Rossel left his family home in Tramelan at the age of 16 to pursue his love for cooking. His first job was as a cook at a small restaurant in Vien, Switzerland. During World War II, Rossel served as a private in the Swiss Army and as a cook.

He received his initial culinary arts training in Zürich, followed by London, Paris, Rome and Venice.

== Early career ==
Early career endeavors found Rossel as Sous Chef at the famed Savoy Hotel in London, the Excelsior in Florence, Italy, and the Hôtel Ritz Paris. He served as Executive Chef at Tower Isle Hotel in Jamaica, and the Caribe Hilton Hotel in Puerto Rico. Chef Rossel moved to the United States in 1952, and assumed the position of Sous Chef and then Executive Chef at the New Yorker Restaurant and finally The Roosevelt Hotel (Manhattan) in New York City and then Executive Chef at the prestigious Hampshire House on Central Park South.

== Executive chef ==
In 1957, Rossel was named Executive Chef at the Hotel Manhattan and then in 1958, accepted the position of Executive Chef at the new highrise Dallas Sheraton Hotel. Rossel opened several Sheraton Hotels for them and acting as Sheraton's Consulting Chef. He negotiated to remain in Dallas even while consulting and opening new Sheraton hotels. He designed the cuisine and served as Executive Chef at Ports of Call Restaurant at the top of the Dallas Sheraton Hotel and also established the cuisine at the famed Chaparral Club in the Sheraton Dallas Hotel, which featured White Glove Service. Here, Rossel crafted the menus and trained the serving staff with an exactness not normally found in hotel dining. Rossel was employed at the Sheraton when he was approached by Braniff and accepted the position of Executive Chef with Braniff International.

== Highest culinary honor ==
Rossel received the nation's highest honor for a chef, when he assumed the Presidency of American Culinary Federation in 1962. When Rossel was hired as Braniff's Executive Chef he was only 44 years old but had 25 years of culinary experience.

In 1962, Rossel was appointed President of the American Culinary Federation. This presidential appointment is the highest honor that can be bestowed on a Chef in the United States. Rossel was appointed at the 1962 Convention of the Federation which was held in his hometown of Dallas, Texas. The Federation was in dire financial straits when Rossel assumed the Presidency. Rossel asked for $25 USD contributions from the membership and over 120 members responded which allowed the organization to continue forward.

Rossel formed an Advisory Committee with the help of several administrators in the culinary business. The committee was able to obtain a grant of $10,000 USD from the Statler Foundation and the proceeds were used to create a new series of manuals for on-the-job-training for chefs. This was the first manual created that was for the apprenticeship of American Chefs and has remained in use ever since.

In 1963, Rossel traveled to the American Institute of Chefs convention, which was being held in Cleveland, Ohio. The chef hoped to get AIC membership to agree to merge with the American Culinary Federation. This was a successful venture and talks and an eventual merger came to fruition in 1965. Rossel served as the Federation's President until 1965, when he was succeeded by Chef John Bandera.

== Culinary Olympics United States Team Captain ==
In 1964, Rossel acted as Captain of the United States team of chefs who took part in and won the International Culinary Olympics held in Frankfurt, Germany. His US team was awarded 7 gold medals. Rossel took another team to the 1980 International Culinary Olympics, repeating a success that American chefs seldom achieve.

== Braniff Airways Executive Chef ==
On November 5, 1965, Braniff International appointed Willy O. Rossel as the airline's Executive Chef. The appointment of an Executive Chef was as a result of the overhaul of Braniff's image and its desire to ensure that its inflight meal service was second-to-none in the industry. Braniff Vice President of Customer Services John Kersey announced the appointment of Rossel in Dallas. Rossel was responsible for directing the preparation of all meals for all flights throughout the Braniff system.

On November 6, 1965, Braniff International presented to the public and media the carrier's revolutionary new look and promotion campaign dubbed End of the Plain Plane created by the New York advertising think tank of Jack Tinker and Partners. The new image for Braniff was created under the guidance of advertising maven Mary Wells. A strategic part of the new campaign was to improve Braniff's already exemplary Silver and Gold inflight service. To achieve this task, the carrier announced the appointment of Rossel.

=== Braniff Inflight Service Before Rossel ===
Braniff Airways already had a long history of distinguished inflight service, first introduced in 1935 on a new 10-passenger Lockheed L-10 Electra twin-engine aircraft. The inflight cuisine, a box luncheonette that featured cold sandwiches, was handed out by the CoPilot.

In 1937, service levels were enhanced with the arrival of 14-passenger twin-engine aircraft which required an attendant to be on board. Braniff touted Southwestern Hospitality on Wings in advertising that announced the new Hostesses who served sandwiches and beverages on trays rather than in boxes.

In 1956, Braniff International Airways introduced an elegant inflight service experience appropriately named Silver Service. In First Class, real silver trays and serviceware were used. The following year, a similar service, Gold Service, was implemented on South American routes traveling to and from the US Mainland and Latin America.

=== Braniff International Board of Chefs ===
With the arrival of Rossel in November 1965, Braniff International began a new era of providing the absolute finest onboard service and cuisine for its customers who were predominantly business travelers. In 1966, a Braniff International Board of Chefs was created and headed by Rossel. The Board consisted of Chefs from four of the most prestigious restaurant establishments in the world and included Roger Piaget of La Pavilion of Peru; Alex Cardini, Cardini's of Mexico City; Federico Buecker of The German Club in Buenos Aires, Argentina, and from the Alexander Girard designed restaurant, La Fonda del Sol, New York, came Felix Meir.

The chefs were asked to "prepare airline food that will taste as good as the food you serve in your own celebrated restaurants." Braniff International declared war on soggy toast, overcooked steak, and cold hors d'oeuvres, which were just a few of the delicacies that had plagued airline chefs of the past. It was a massive success with a further improvement of Braniff's already exemplary fare. Once again, advertising was aimed at Braniff's chief customer, the male business traveler, which stated that the airline was committed to Our Battle For Men's Stomachs.

=== Braniff Ultra Service ===
Rossel remained with Braniff until 1980, and oversaw the introduction of the Braniff International's Ultra Service inflight airline service program on all Braniff International flights beginning in 1977.

Ultra Service was part of the airline's new Elegance Campaign that was announced in late 1976, and introduced in February 1977. The new Ultra Service received critical acclaim from restaurant and culinary critics.

== Pan Am Executive Chef ==
In 1982, Rossel was appointed Executive Chef and Food Service Director at Pan American World Airways, in Miami, Florida. Pan Am's Chairman was Charles Edward Acker who was the former President of Braniff Airways until 1975. Former Braniff President Harding Lawrence was also consulting for Pan Am and his wife Mary Wells Lawrence, whose advertising firm Wells Rich Greene served as Pan Am's agency. Several of these Pan Am executives had previously worked with Rossel during his tenure at Braniff.

Once again, the chef was responsible for overseeing the planning and preparation for every meal served throughout Pan Am's global system. Chef Rossel retired from Pan Am in 1985.

After Pan Am, he continued his airline career at Wien Air Alaska, as Executive Chef for the airline. Rossel consulted for several airlines during the remainder of the 1990s. In addition to Braniff International, Pan Am and Wien Air Alaska, Chef Rossel also consulted on culinary matters with Air Florida, Continental Airlines, American Airlines, Canadian Pacific Airlines, and United Airlines.

== Personal life ==
He was Head Historian for American Culinary Federation, until 2013. Rossel donated the archives of his life's work to Auburn University in March 2001.

Rossel continued to cook throughout his 80s and 90s. He moved to Edinburg, Texas. In 2015 he was diagnosed with pancreatic cancer and died in September 2015.
