= Corgémont =

- Municipality
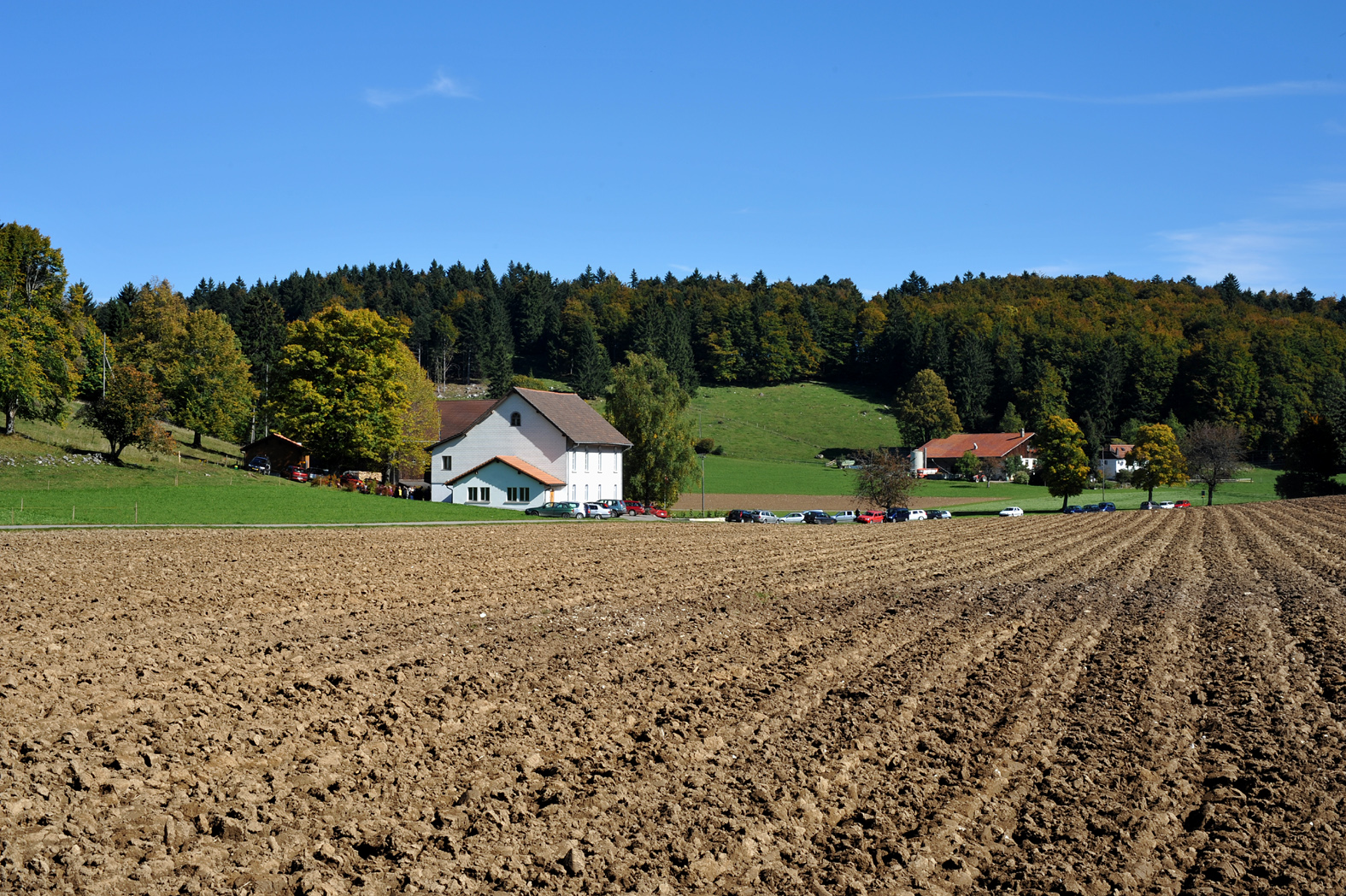
- Mennonite library north of Corgémont

- Flag Coat of arms
- Location of Corgémont
- Location within Switzerland Location within Canton of Bern
- Coordinates: 47°12′N 7°9′E
- Country: Switzerland
- Canton: Bern
- District: Jura bernois

Government
  - Mayor: Maire; Michel Tschan SVP/UDC

Area
  - Total: 17.6 km^{2} (6.8 sq mi)
- Elevation: 663 m (2,175 ft)

Population (December 2020)
  - Total: 1,774
  - Density: 101/km^{2} (261/sq mi)
- Time zone: UTC+01:00 (CET)
  - Summer (DST): UTC+02:00 (CEST)
- Postal code: 2606
- SFOS number: 431
- ISO 3166 code: CH-BE
- Surrounded by: Tramelan, Mont-Tramelan, Cortébert, Nods, Orvin, Sonceboz-Sombeval, Tavannes
- Website: www.corgemont.ch

Corgémont is a municipality in the Jura bernois administrative district in the canton of Bern in Switzerland. It is located in the French-speaking part of the canton in the Jura Mountains.

== History ==
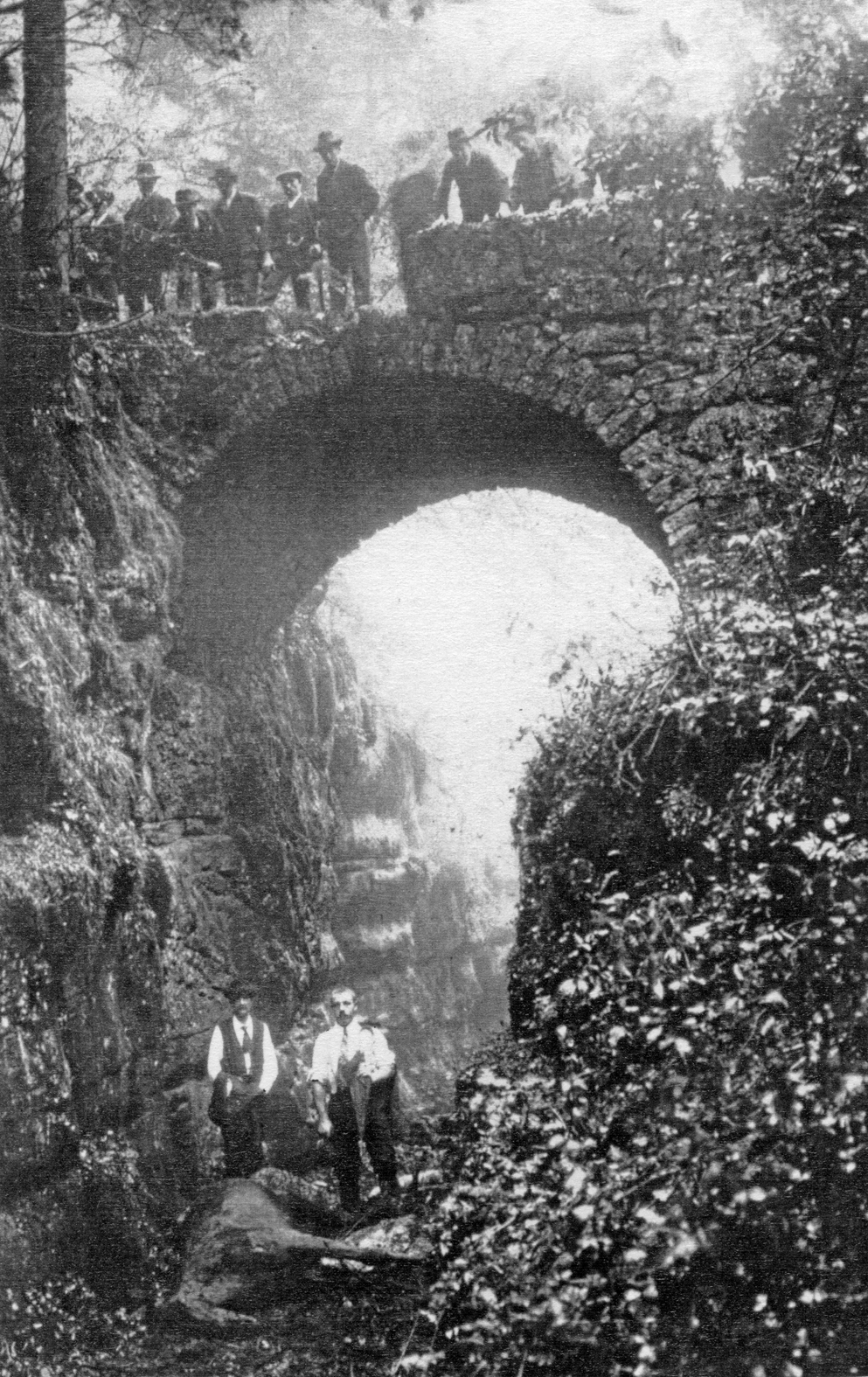
The Anabaptist bridge south of Corgémont in 1918. This is the only surviving picture of the intact bridge

Aerial view from 1200 m by Walter Mittelholzer (1930)

Corgémont was first mentioned in 1178 as Coriamont. In 1179 Pope Alexander III confirmed the rights of the Abbey of Moutier-Grandval to their property in Corgémont. From the 12th to 15th century much of the village was owned by the noble family de Corgémont (also known as de Chalmé), who had received the property from the Prince-Bishop of Basel. Later this property was transferred to the Family d'Asuel. Corgémont belonged to the Barony of Erguel which was under the Prince-Bishops. In 1530 Biel introduced the Reformation to Corgémont.

== Geography ==
Corgémont has an area of 17.66 km^{2} (6.82 sq mi). Of this area, 9.88 km^{2} (3.81 mi^{2}) or 55.9% is used for agricultural purposes, while 6.64 km^{2} (2.56 mi^{2}) or 37.6% is forested. Of the rest of the land, 1.1 km^{2} (0.42 mi^{2}) or 6.2% is settled (buildings or roads), 0.03 km^{2} (7.4 acres) or 0.2% is either rivers or lakes and 0.00 km^{2} (0 acres) or 0.0% is unproductive land.

Of the built up area, housing and buildings made up 3.0% and transportation infrastructure made up 2.2%. Out of the forested land, 31.8% of the total land area is heavily forested and 5.8% is covered with orchards or small clusters of trees. Of the agricultural land, 12.0% is used for growing crops and 18.6% is pastures and 25.0% is used for alpine pastures. All the water in the municipality is flowing water.

On 31 December 2009 District de Courtelary, the municipality's former district, was dissolved. On the following day, 1 January 2010, it joined the newly created Arrondissement administratif Jura bernois.

== Coat of arms ==
The blazon of the municipal coat of arms is Gules a Guidon Argent.

== Demographics ==
Corgémont has a population (as of December 2020) of 1,774. As of 2010, 11.4% of the population are resident foreign nationals. Over the last 10 years (2000–2010) the population has changed at a rate of 1.6%. Migration accounted for 2.5%, while births and deaths accounted for -0.7%.

Most of the population (as of 2000) speaks French (1,157 or 77.5%) as their first language, German is the second most common (241 or 16.1%) and Italian is the third (50 or 3.3%). There are 3 people who speak Romansh.

As of 2008, the population was 49.8% male and 50.2% female. The population was made up of 676 Swiss men (43.7% of the population) and 95 (6.1%) non-Swiss men. There were 696 Swiss women (45.0%) and 81 (5.2%) non-Swiss women. Of the population in the municipality, 446 or about 29.9% were born in Corgémont and lived there in 2000. There were 577 or 38.6% who were born in the same canton, while 239 or 16.0% were born somewhere else in Switzerland, and 184 or 12.3% were born outside of Switzerland.

As of 2010, children and teenagers (0–19 years old) make up 23.2% of the population, while adults (20–64 years old) make up 57.8% and seniors (over 64 years old) make up 19.1%.

As of 2000, there were 567 people who were single and never married in the municipality. There were 768 married individuals, 83 widows or widowers and 75 individuals who are divorced.

As of 2000, there were 141 households that consist of only one person and 38 households with five or more people. In 2000, a total of 585 apartments (84.3% of the total) were permanently occupied, while 70 apartments (10.1%) were seasonally occupied and 39 apartments (5.6%) were empty. As of 2010, the construction rate of new housing units was 0.6 new units per 1000 residents. The vacancy rate for the municipality, in 2011, was 1.6%.

The historical population is given in the following chart:

== Heritage sites of national significance ==
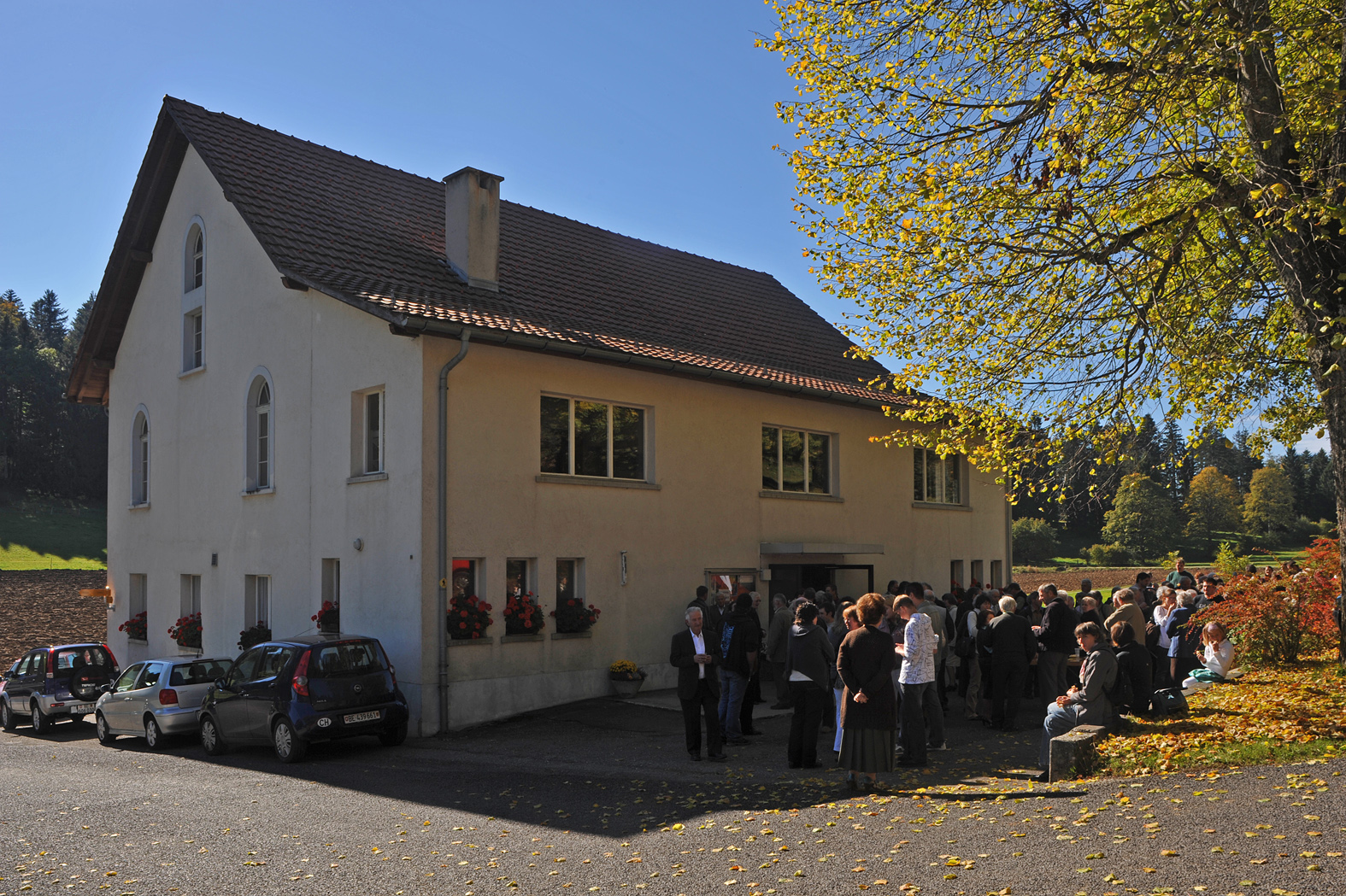
The Bibliothèque De La Conférence Mennonite Suisse

The Bibliothèque De La Conférence Mennonite Suisse is listed as a Swiss heritage site of national significance.

== Politics ==
In the 2011 federal election the most popular party was the Swiss People's Party (SVP) which received 35.8% of the vote. The next three most popular parties were the Social Democratic Party (SP) (22%), the Green Party (11.5%) and the FDP.The Liberals (10.5%). In the federal election, a total of 470 votes were cast, and the voter turnout was 42.8%.

== Economy ==
As of 2011, Corgémont had an unemployment rate of 2.64%. As of 2008, there were a total of 579 people employed in the municipality. Of these, there were 84 people employed in the primary economic sector and about 28 businesses involved in this sector. 212 people were employed in the secondary sector and there were 26 businesses in this sector. 283 people were employed in the tertiary sector, with 44 businesses in this sector. There were 5 residents of the municipality who were employed in some capacity, of which females made up 20.0% of the workforce.

In 2008 there were a total of 485 full-time equivalent jobs. The number of jobs in the primary sector was 55, of which 54 were in agriculture and 1 was in forestry or lumber production. The number of jobs in the secondary sector was 195 of which 164 or (84.1%) were in manufacturing and 31 (15.9%) were in construction. The number of jobs in the tertiary sector was 235. In the tertiary sector; 36 or 15.3% were in wholesale or retail sales or the repair of motor vehicles, 11 or 4.7% were in the movement and storage of goods, 8 or 3.4% were in a hotel or restaurant, 5 or 2.1% were in the information industry, 6 or 2.6% were technical professionals or scientists, 23 or 9.8% were in education and 34 or 14.5% were in health care.

In 2000, there were 210 workers who commuted into the municipality and 454 workers who commuted away. The municipality is a net exporter of workers, with about 2.2 workers leaving the municipality for every one entering. About 2.4% of the workforce coming into Corgémont are coming from outside Switzerland. Of the working population, 12.7% used public transportation to get to work, and 59.9% used a private car.

== Religion ==
From the 2000 census, 340 or 22.8% were Roman Catholic, while 798 or 53.4% belonged to the Swiss Reformed Church. Of the rest of the population, there were 5 members of an Orthodox church (or about 0.33% of the population), there were 2 individuals (or about 0.13% of the population) who belonged to the Christian Catholic Church, and there were 232 individuals (or about 15.54% of the population) who belonged to another Christian church. There were 40 (or about 2.68% of the population) who were Islamic. There were 2 individuals who were Buddhist. 139 (or about 9.31% of the population) belonged to no church, are agnostic or atheist, and 50 individuals (or about 3.35% of the population) did not answer the question.

== Education ==
In Corgémont about 580 or (38.8%) of the population have completed non-mandatory upper secondary education, and 126 or (8.4%) have completed additional higher education (either university or a Fachhochschule). Of the 126 who completed tertiary schooling, 63.5% were Swiss men, 25.4% were Swiss women, 7.1% were non-Swiss men and 4.0% were non-Swiss women.

The Canton of Bern school system provides one year of non-obligatory Kindergarten, followed by six years of Primary school. This is followed by three years of obligatory lower Secondary school where the students are separated according to ability and aptitude. Following the lower Secondary students may attend additional schooling or they may enter an apprenticeship.

During the 2010–11 school year, there were a total of 331 students attending classes in Corgémont. There were 2 kindergarten classes with a total of 42 students in the municipality. Of the kindergarten students, 7.1% were permanent or temporary residents of Switzerland (not citizens) and 16.7% have a different mother language than the classroom language. The municipality had 6 primary classes and 86 students. Of the primary students, 14.0% were permanent or temporary residents of Switzerland (not citizens) and 18.6% have a different mother language than the classroom language. During the same year, there were 11 lower secondary classes with a total of 203 students. There were 13.8% who were permanent or temporary residents of Switzerland (not citizens) and 18.2% have a different mother language than the classroom language.

As of 2000, there were 135 students in Corgémont who came from another municipality, while 60 residents attended schools outside the municipality.

== Transportation ==
The municipality has a railway station, Corgémont. The station is located on the Biel/Bienne–La Chaux-de-Fonds line and has hourly service to Biel/Bienne and La Chaux-de-Fonds.
