= André Ramseyer =

Swiss sculptor (1914-2007)

- Born: 31 January 1914; Tramelan, Switzerland
- Died: 15 January 2007 (aged 92); Neuchâtel, Switzerland
- Known for: Sculpture
- Spouse: Jacqueline Marcelle Maeder

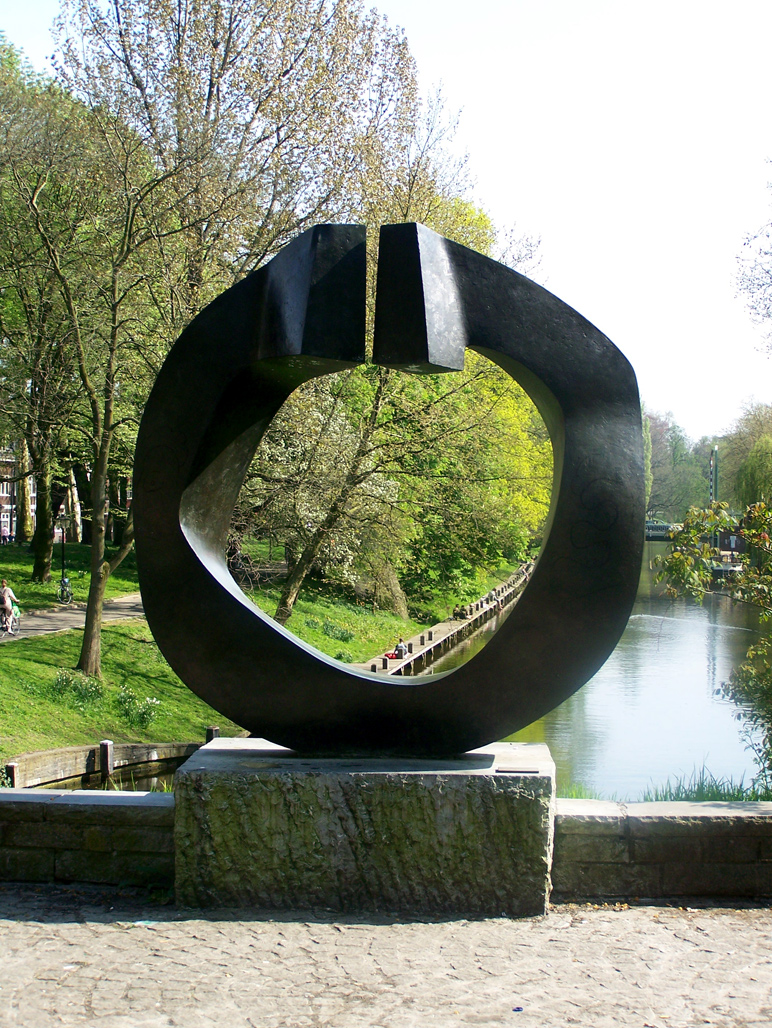
Grand Astre (1966), installed in Utrecht in 1974

André Ramseyer (31 January 1914 – 15 January 2007) was a Swiss sculptor known for monumental works. After a brief figurative period, his work developed towards abstraction, with circular forms, open space and light becoming prominent features. His sculptures were installed in public locations in Switzerland and abroad. He received an award at the International Sculpture Exhibition in Carrara in 1957 and the Jean Arp Prize in Biel in 1966.

== Biography ==
André Ramseyer was born on 31 January 1914 in Tramelan. He obtained a teaching qualification in 1932 and studied at the art school in La Chaux-de-Fonds from 1932 to 1935. During these years, he also spent time in Paris and Florence. In 1936, he qualified to teach art.

Ramseyer married Jacqueline Marcelle Maeder in 1941. He moved to Neuchâtel in 1943 and taught drawing and art history there until 1970. In 1949, he returned to Paris, where he worked in the studio of sculptor Ossip Zadkine. In later life, declining strength led Ramseyer to devote more attention to writing poetry. He died in Neuchâtel on 15 January 2007.

== Work ==
Ramseyer was known for monumental sculpture in French-speaking Switzerland. After a brief figurative period, which included Baigneuse (1948), his sculpture became increasingly abstract and pared down, as seen in Constellation (1960) and Escale (1962). Henry Moore was an important influence on his approach to open space and light in sculpture.

Circular and curved shapes became a defining feature of Ramseyer’s sculpture. He adapted the circle into forms such as ellipses, spirals and waves, combining visual movement with stability. As his work developed, he increasingly incorporated openings and light into the overall design.

From 1938, Ramseyer took part in numerous solo and group exhibitions. By 2004, more than fifty of his works had been placed in school grounds and other public locations in Switzerland. His sculptures could also be found in Italy, the United States, the Netherlands and Saudi Arabia. He received an award at the International Sculpture Exhibition in Carrara in 1957, followed in 1966 by the Jean Arp Prize and an award from the Musée des beaux-arts de La Chaux-de-Fonds. In 1975, he received the prize of the Institut neuchâtelois.

Ramseyer’s work is held in collections including the Swiss Federal Art Collection in Bern and the Musée d’art du Valais in Sion. The Centre Pompidou in Paris also holds one of his sculptures. His public sculptures include Consolation (1954) in Biel, Eurythmie (1955) at the Swiss Embassy in Washington, D.C., Constellation (1960) at the University of Neuchâtel and Évasion (1990) in the courtyard of Neuchâtel Castle.

== Legacy ==
In November 2022, his two children donated about twenty sculptures, around one hundred two-dimensional works and an archival binder to the Fondation Ateliers d'Artiste in Saint-Maurice.

== Gallery ==
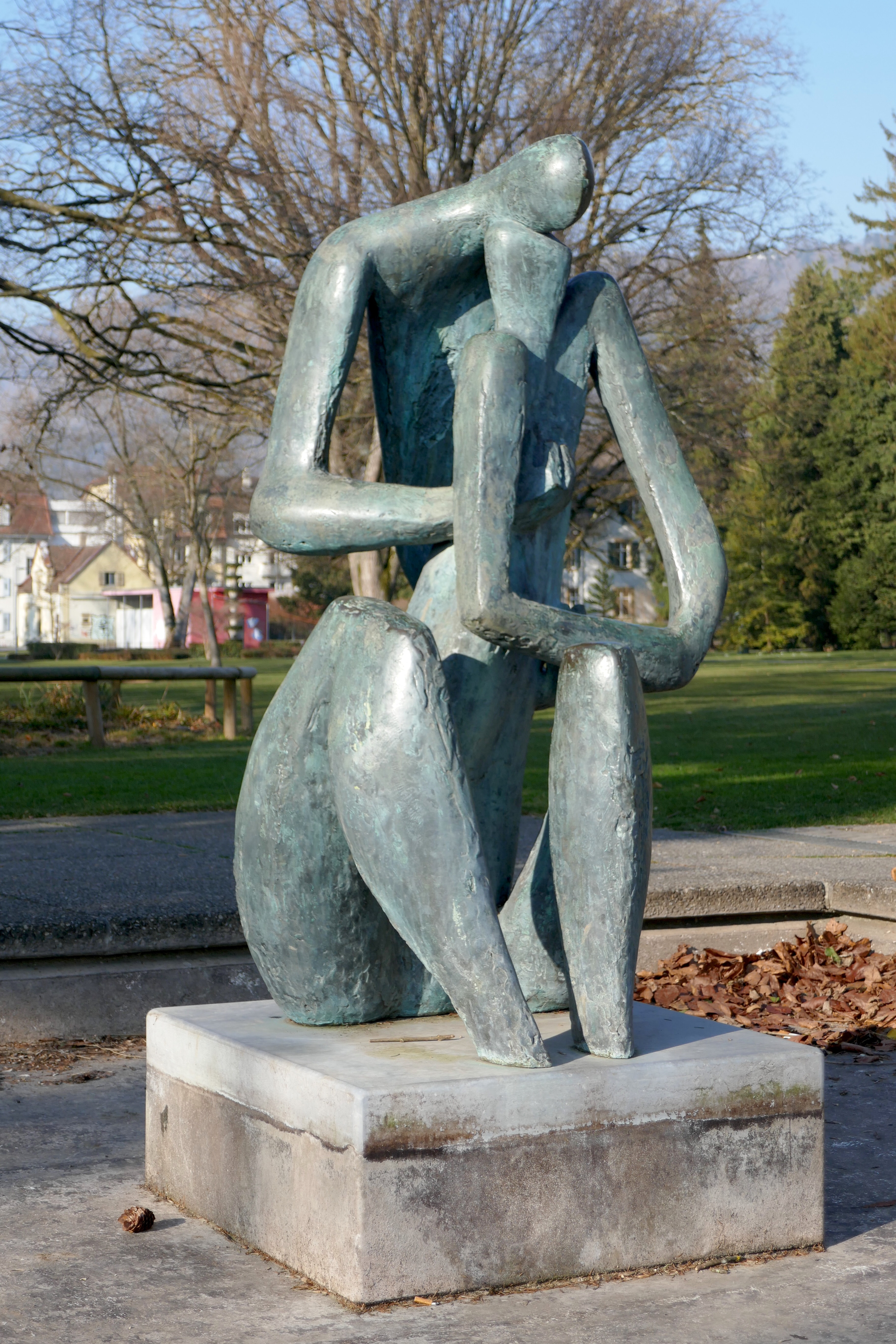
Consolation (1954), municipal park, Biel

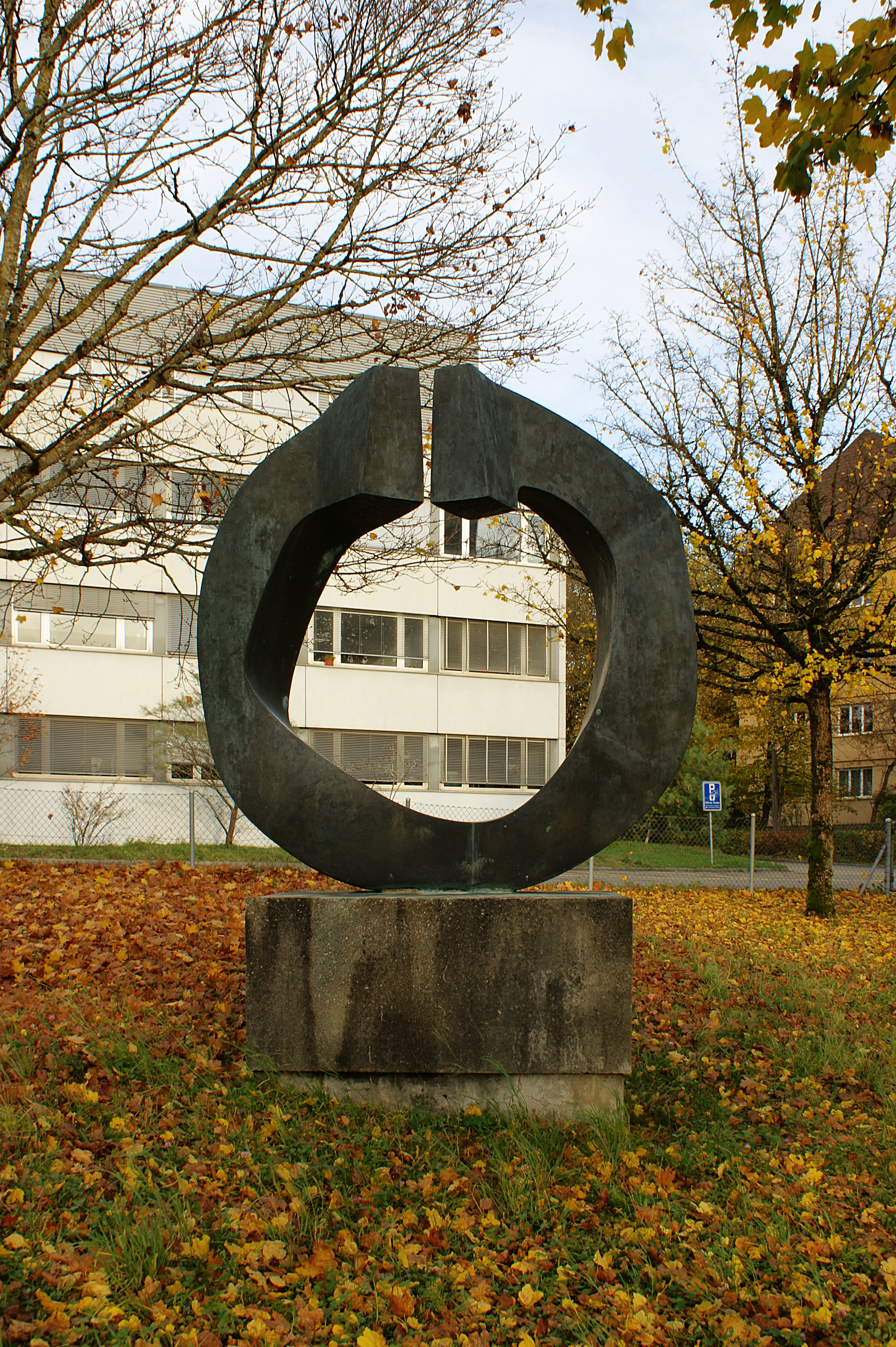
Grand Astre 1/3 (1966), Bern

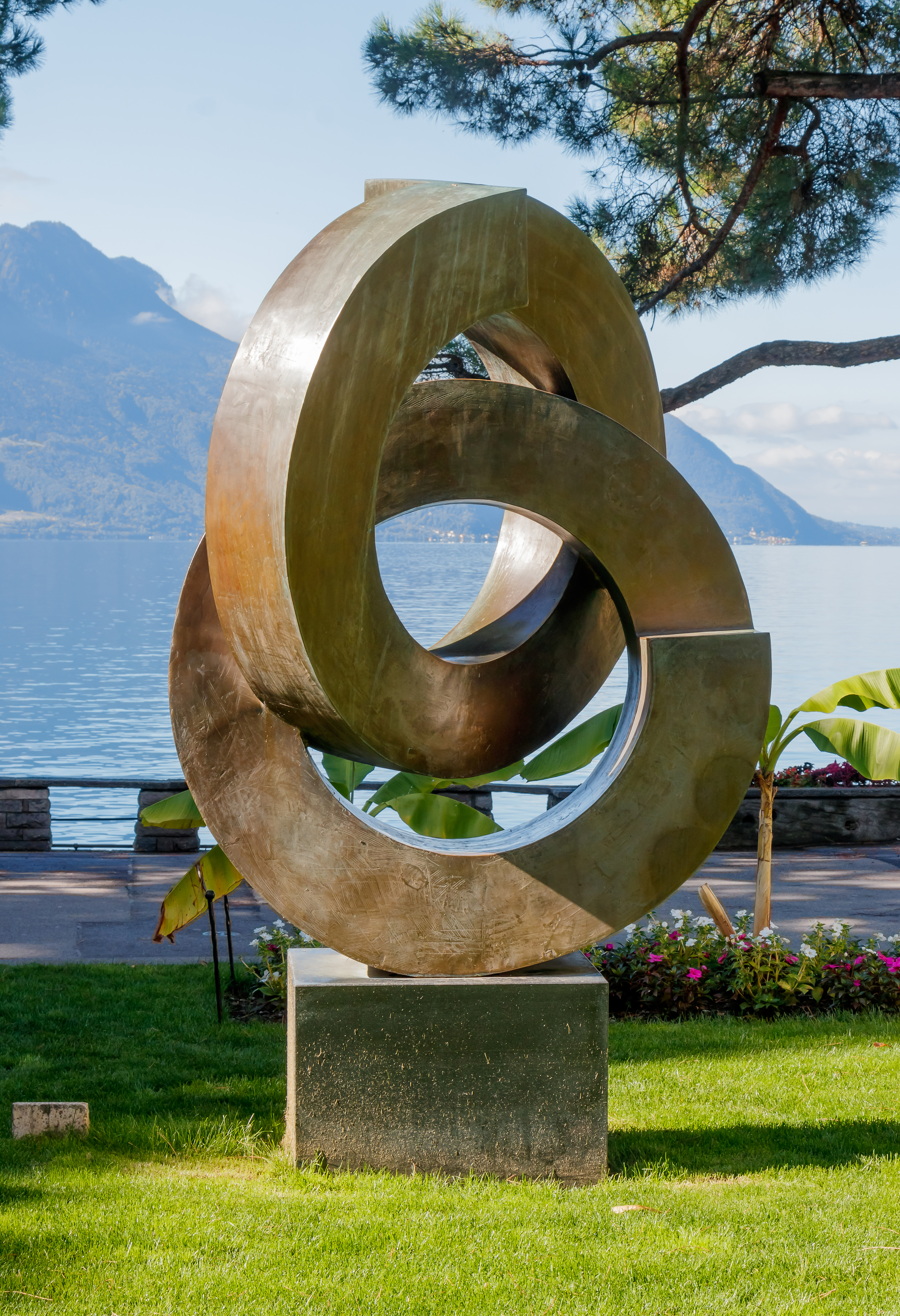
Plenitude (1985), Montreux
