= Cortébert railway station =

Railway station in Cortébert, Bern, Switzerland

Cortébert
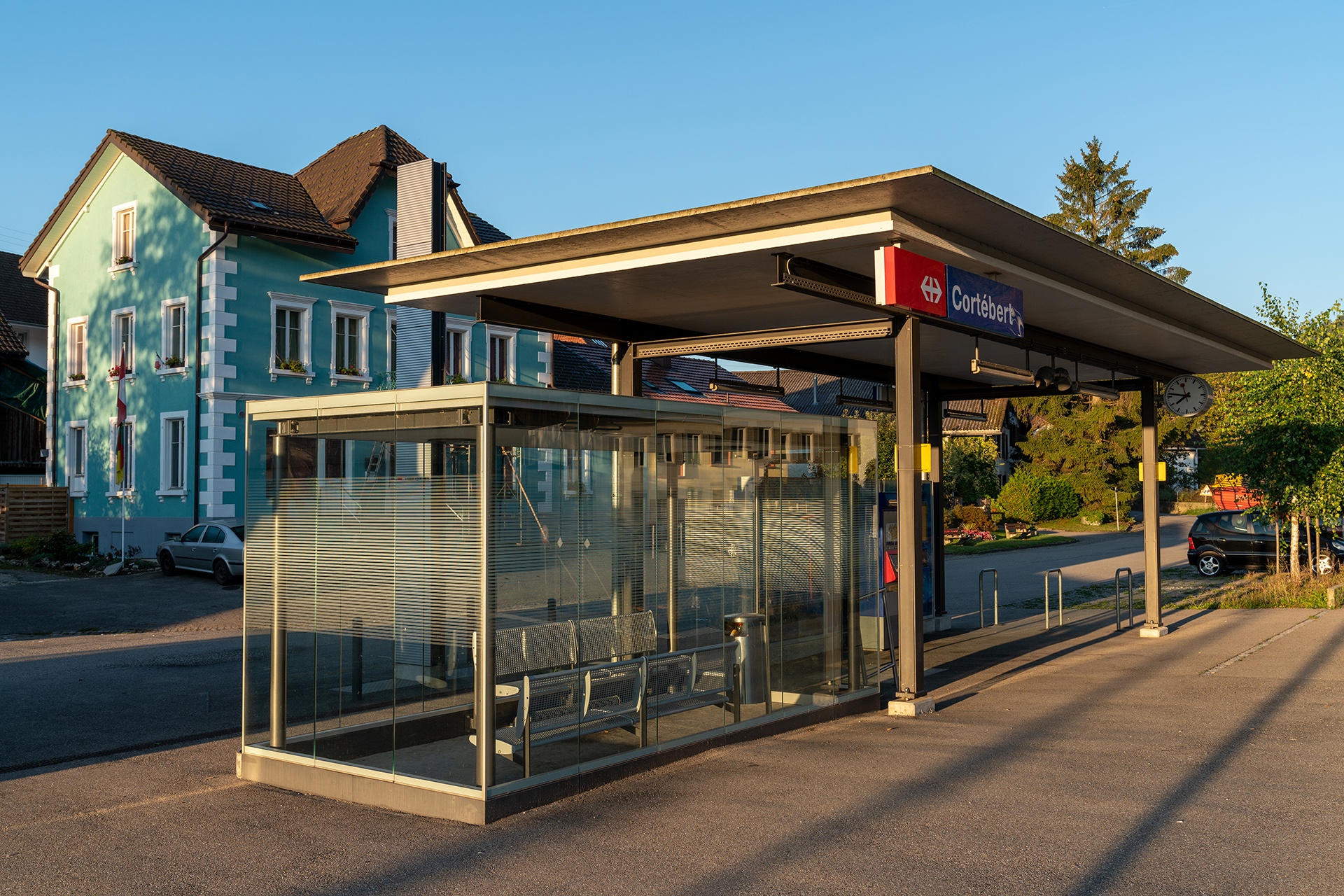
- The station platform in 2018

General information
- Location: Cortébert; Switzerland
- Coordinates: 47°11′22″N 7°06′26″E
- Elevation: 677 m (2,221 ft)
- Owner: Swiss Federal Railways
- Line: Biel/Bienne–La Chaux-de-Fonds line
- Distance: 53.1 km (33.0 mi) from Bern
- Platforms: 1 side platform
- Tracks: 1
- Train operators: Swiss Federal Railways

Construction
- Parking: 18

Other information
- Station code: 8504306 (CO)
- Fare zone: 322 (Libero)

Passengers
- 2023: 160 per weekday (SBB)

Services
Preceding station	SBB CFF FFS	Following station
Courtelary towards La Chaux-de-Fonds	R41	Corgémont towards Biel/Bienne
Location

Cortébert railway station (French: Gare de Cortébert) is a railway station in the municipality of Cortébert, in the Swiss canton of Bern. It is an intermediate stop on the standard gauge Biel/Bienne–La Chaux-de-Fonds line of Swiss Federal Railways.

== Services ==
As of the December 2023 timetable change, the following services stop at Cortébert:

- Regio: hourly service between La Chaux-de-Fonds and Biel/Bienne.
