= Mont-Tramelan =

- Municipality
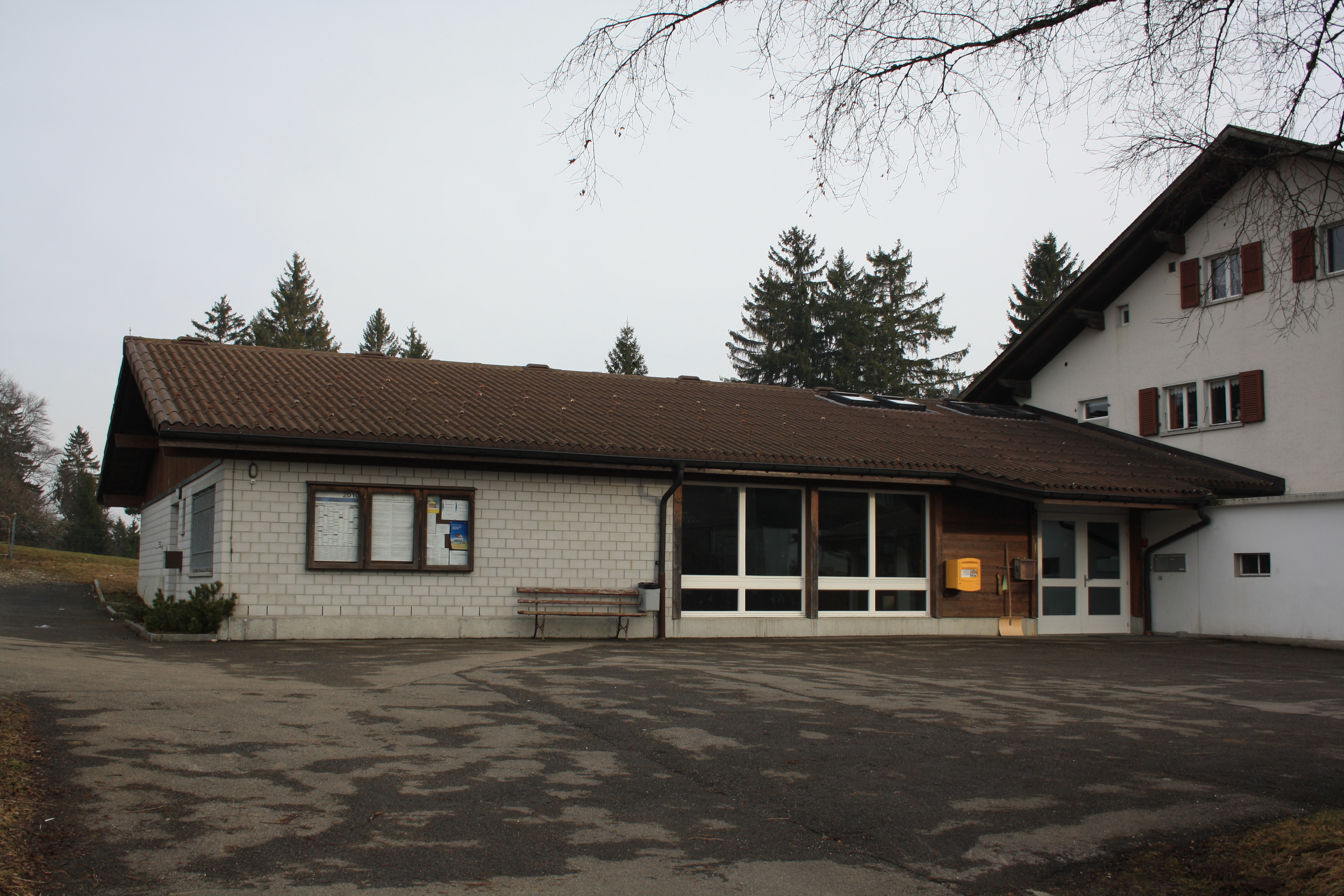
- Mont-Tramelan village school house

- Flag Coat of arms
- Location of Mont-Tramelan
- Location within Switzerland Location within Canton of Bern
- Coordinates: 47°13′N 7°3′E
- Country: Switzerland
- Canton: Bern
- District: Jura bernois

Government
  - Mayor: Maire; Bruno Gerber

Area
  - Total: 4.64 km^{2} (1.79 sq mi)
- Elevation: 1,060 m (3,480 ft)

Population (December 2020)
  - Total: 111
  - Density: 23.9/km^{2} (62.0/sq mi)
- Time zone: UTC+01:00 (CET)
  - Summer (DST): UTC+02:00 (CEST)
- Postal code: 2713
- SFOS number: 437
- ISO 3166 code: CH-BE
- Surrounded by: Courtelary, Cortébert, Corgémont, Tramelan, Tavannes, Saicourt, La Chaux-des-Breuleux
- Website: https://www.mont-tramelan.ch/

Mont-Tramelan (French pronunciation: [mɔ̃ tʁamlɑ̃]) is a municipality in the Jura bernois administrative district in the canton of Bern in Switzerland. It is located in the French-speaking Bernese Jura (Jura Bernois). While the majority of the population speaks German, the German form of the municipality name, Tramlingen-Berg, is no longer used. Even though it is in the French-speaking part of the canton of Bern, there is a German public school.

== History ==
Around 1570 the Prince-Bishop of Basel allowed Anabaptist refugees from the Emmental to settle in the seigniory of Erguel, including in the area that would become Mont-Tramelan. The farms in the area were part of the parish of Tramelan, which adopted the Reformed faith in 1530. At the beginning of the 17th Century, a family from Neuchâtel founded the community which was known as Montagnes de la paroisse de Tramelan. The earliest record of the community is from 1647 when it was known simply as la Montagne. In 1685 it was acknowledged by the Bishop. Following the 1798 French invasion, Mont-Tramelan became a commune under French rule. It remained under French authority until 1814 and in following year became part of the Canton of Bern.

During the 19th century, the watch making industry flourished in the French-speaking Jura region. The majority of the francophone families of Mont-Tramelan abandoned their farms and moved to the nearby watch making towns, leaving a German-speaking majority in the villages. In 1897, the formerly private Baptist school in the village became a German-speaking public school for the municipality. A new German speaking school was built in 1953. In 1942, German became the official municipal language. This decision created a German-speaking enclave in a French-speaking district at a time when the Jurassic separatism movement was beginning to grow.

In 1938 Mont-Tramelan joined the Syndicat des eaux Franches-Montagnes which built a pump station at Cortébert to supply water to the municipalities and farms of the region. Agriculture is still the main source of income of the population.

== Geography ==
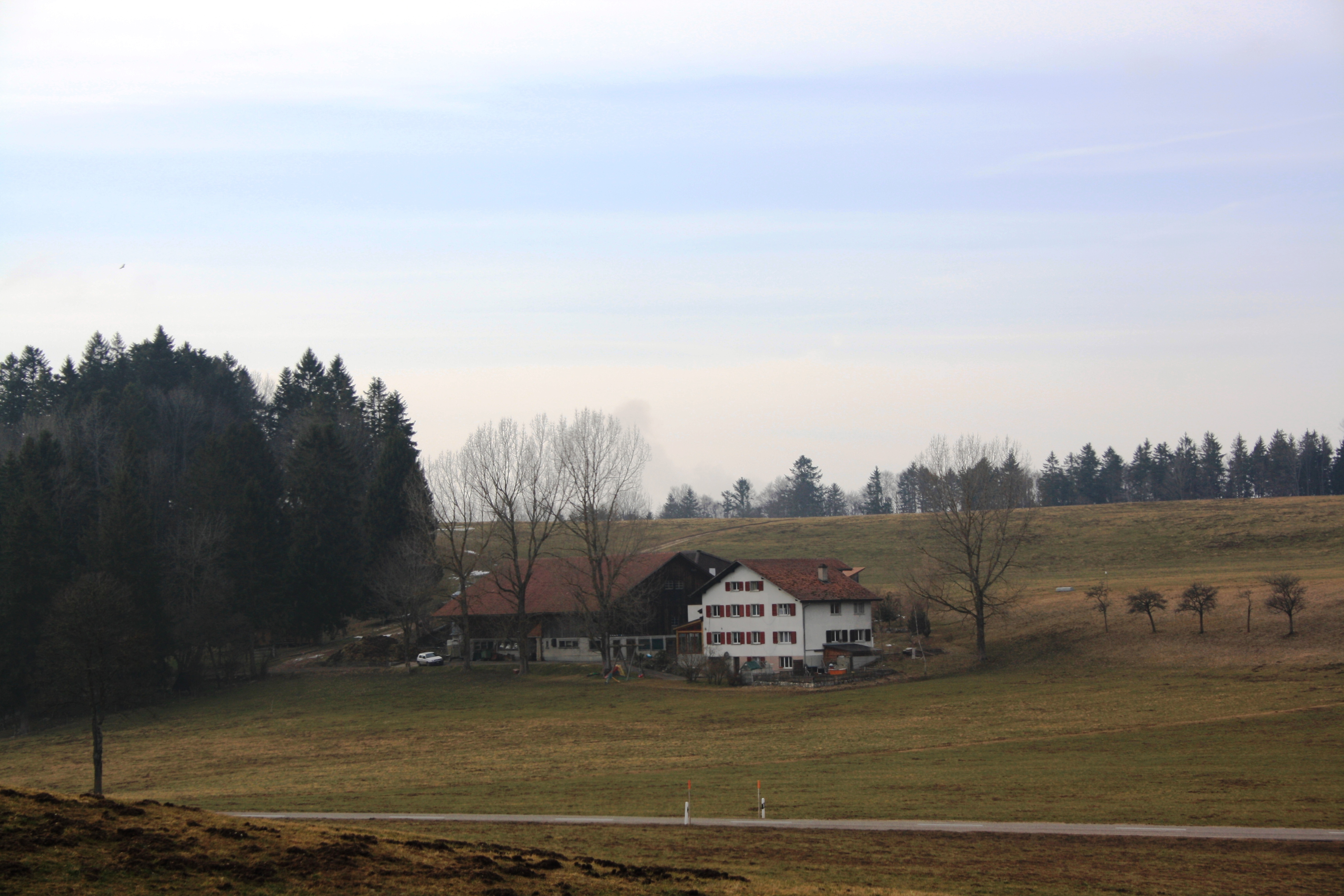
Farm and countryside in Mont-Tramelan

Mont-Tramelan has an area of 4.64 km^{2} (1.79 sq mi). Of this area, 2.78 km^{2} (1.07 mi^{2}) or 60.0% is used for agricultural purposes, while 1.76 km^{2} (0.68 mi^{2}) or 38.0% is forested. Of the rest of the land, 0.13 km^{2} (32 acres) or 2.8% is settled (buildings or roads).

Of the built up area, housing and buildings made up 1.1% and transportation infrastructure made up 1.7%. Out of the forested land, 29.4% of the total land area is heavily forested and 8.6% is covered with orchards or small clusters of trees. Of the agricultural land, 4.8% is used for growing crops and 52.1% is pastures and 3.0% is used for alpine pastures.

It consists of several scattered settlements (Les Fontaines, La Paule und Les Places) which are all about 1,000 meters (3,300 ft) above sea level.

On 31 December 2009 District de Courtelary, the municipality's former district, was dissolved. On the following day, 1 January 2010, it joined the newly created Arrondissement administratif Jura bernois.

== Coat of arms ==
The blazon of the municipal coat of arms is Gules on a Bend sinister Argent three Linden Leaves of the first issuant from chief and a Mount of 3 Coupeaux of the second.

== Demographics ==
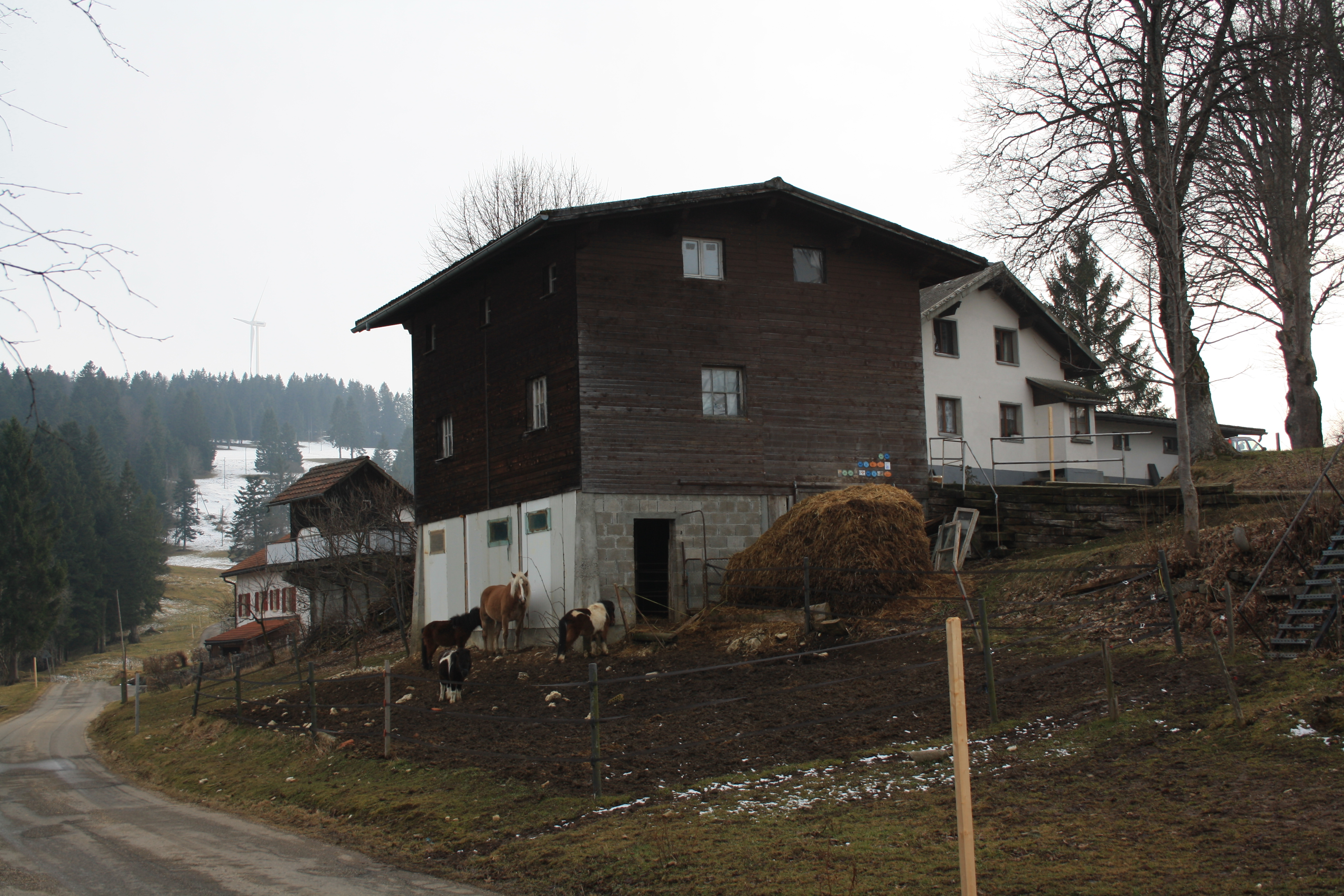
A farm in Mont-Tramelan. Tha majority of the population still works in agriculture.

Mont-Tramelan has a population (as of December 2020) of 111. As of 2010, 0.8% of the population are resident foreign nationals. Over the last 10 years (2000-2010) the population has changed at a rate of -6.2%. Migration accounted for -4.7%, while births and deaths accounted for -1.6%.

Most of the population (as of 2000) speaks German (82 or 70.7%) as their first language, French is the second most common (30 or 25.9%) and Serbo-Croatian is the third (3 or 2.6%).

As of 2008, the population was 46.7% male and 53.3% female. The population was made up of 55 Swiss men (45.8% of the population) and 1 (0.8%) non-Swiss man. There were 64 Swiss women (53.3%) and (0.0%) non-Swiss women. Of the population in the municipality, 62 or about 53.4% were born in Mont-Tramelan and lived there in 2000. There were 38 or 32.8% who were born in the same canton, while 6 or 5.2% were born somewhere else in Switzerland, and 10 or 8.6% were born outside of Switzerland.

As of 2010, children and teenagers (0–19 years old) make up 27.5% of the population, while adults (20–64 years old) make up 52.5% and seniors (over 64 years old) make up 20%.

As of 2000, there were 45 people who were single and never married in the municipality. There were 65 married individuals, 6 widows or widowers and individuals who are divorced.

As of 2000, there were 7 households that consist of only one person and 5 households with five or more people. In 2000, a total of 41 apartments (82.0% of the total) were permanently occupied, while 8 apartments (16.0%) were seasonally occupied and one apartment was empty.

The historical population is given in the following chart:

== Politics ==
In the 2011 federal election, the most popular party was the Swiss People's Party (SVP) which received 36.4% of the vote. The next three most popular parties were the Evangelical People's Party (EVP) and the Christian Social Party (CSP) (both with 24.1%) and the Conservative Democratic Party (BDP) (13.7%). In the federal election, a total of 63 votes were cast, and the voter turnout was 60.6%.

== Economy ==
As of 2011, Mont-Tramelan had an unemployment rate of 0.38%. As of 2008, there were a total of 56 people employed in the municipality. Of these, there were 49 people employed in the primary economic sector and about 14 businesses involved in this sector. 1 person was employed in the secondary sector and there was 1 business in this sector. 6 people were employed in the tertiary sector, with 2 businesses in this sector.

In 2008 there were a total of 33 full-time equivalent jobs. The number of jobs in the primary sector was 28, all of which were in agriculture. The number of jobs in the secondary sector was 1, in manufacturing. The number of jobs in the tertiary sector was 4. In the tertiary sector; 1 was in a hotel or restaurant and 2 were in education.

In 2000, there were 3 workers who commuted into the municipality and 22 workers who commuted away. The municipality is a net exporter of workers, with about 7.3 workers leaving the municipality for every one entering. Of the working population, 1.6% used public transportation to get to work, and 31.3% used a private car.

== Religion ==
From the 2000 census, eight residents (or 6.9%) were Roman Catholic, while 30 or 25.9% belonged to the Swiss Reformed Church. Of the rest of the population, there were four members of an Orthodox church (or about 3.45% of the population), and there were 16 individuals (or about 13.79% of the population) who belonged to another Christian church. Seven people (or about 6.03% of the population) belonged to no church, were agnostic or atheist, and one individual (or about 0.86% of the population) did not answer the question.

== Education ==
In Mont-Tramelan about 42 or (36.2%) of the population have completed non-mandatory upper secondary education, and 11 or (9.5%) have completed additional higher education (either university or a Fachhochschule). Of the 11 who completed tertiary schooling, 63.6% were Swiss men, 27.3% were Swiss women.

The Canton of Bern school system provides one year of non-obligatory Kindergarten, followed by six years of Primary school. This is followed by three years of obligatory lower Secondary school where the students are separated according to ability and aptitude. Following the lower Secondary students may attend additional schooling or they may enter an apprenticeship.

Even though the municipality is in a French-speaking district, the municipal school is German speaking. During the 2010–11 school year, there were a total of 23 students attending classes in Mont-Tramelan. There were no kindergarten classes in the municipality. The municipality had one primary class and 16 students. Of the primary students 12.5% do not speak German as their mother language. During the same year, there was one lower secondary class with a total of 7 students of which 14.3% do not speak German as their mother language.

As of 2000, there were 4 students in Mont-Tramelan who came from another municipality, while 11 residents attended schools outside the municipality.
