= Corgémont railway station =

Railway station in Corgémont, Bern, Switzerland

Corgémont
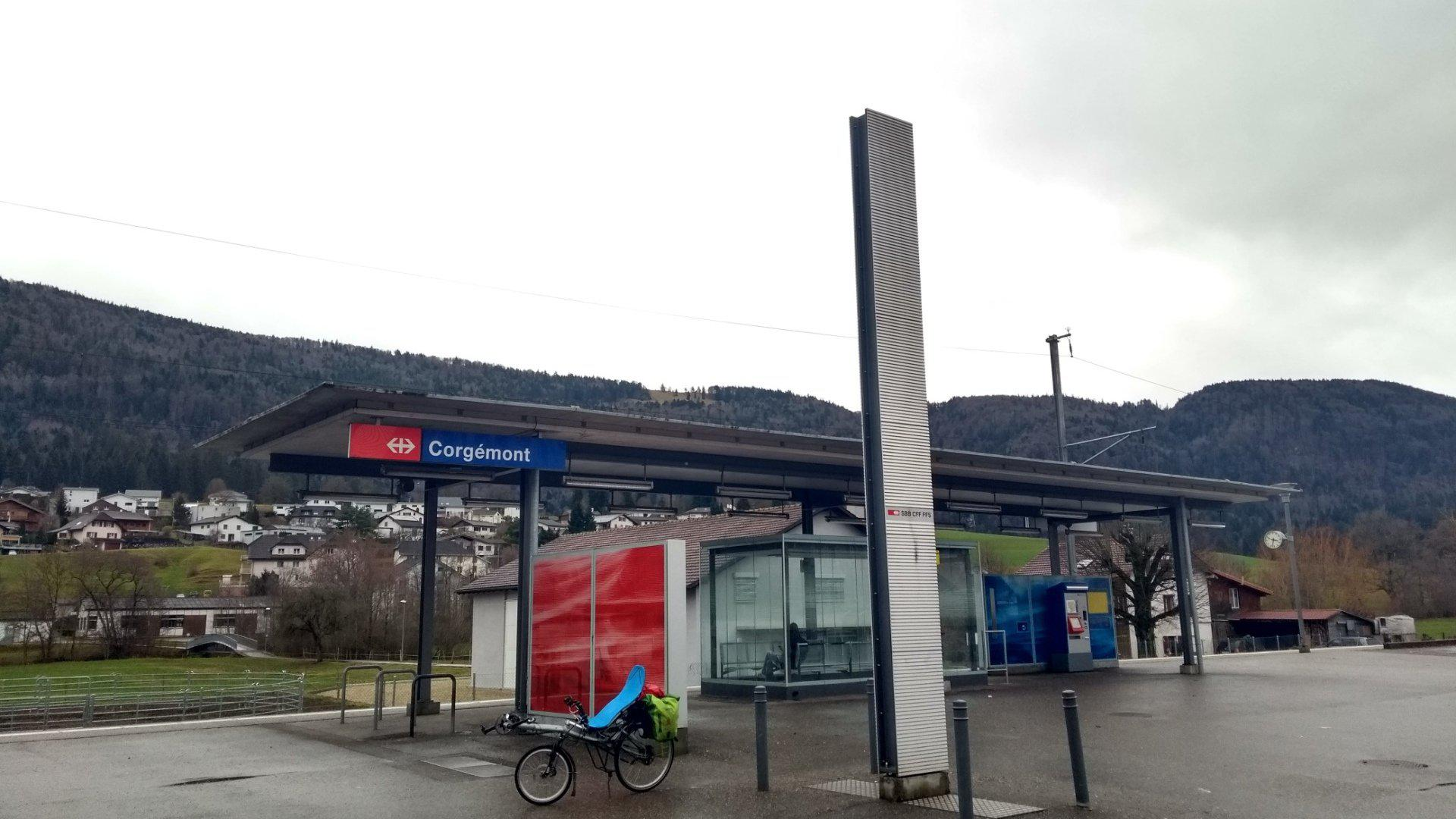
- The station platform in 2018

General information
- Location: Corgémont; Switzerland
- Coordinates: 47°11′36″N 7°08′41″E
- Elevation: 660 m (2,170 ft)
- Owner: Swiss Federal Railways
- Line: Biel/Bienne–La Chaux-de-Fonds line
- Distance: 50.2 km (31.2 mi) from Bern
- Platforms: 1 side platform
- Tracks: 1
- Train operators: Swiss Federal Railways

Construction
- Parking: 5
- Accessible: Yes

Other information
- Station code: 8504305 (COG)
- Fare zone: 322 (Libero)

Passengers
- 2023: 490 per weekday (SBB)

Services
Preceding station	SBB CFF FFS	Following station
Cortébert towards La Chaux-de-Fonds	R41	Sonceboz-Sombeval towards Biel/Bienne
Location

Corgémont railway station (French: Gare de Corgémont) is a railway station in the municipality of Corgémont, in the Swiss canton of Bern. It is an intermediate stop on the standard gauge Biel/Bienne–La Chaux-de-Fonds line of Swiss Federal Railways.

== Services ==
As of the December 2023 timetable change, the following services stop at Corgémont:

- Regio: hourly service between La Chaux-de-Fonds and Biel/Bienne.
