= 88 Rue du Rhone =

Swiss watchmaker

- Industry: Watchmaking
- Founded: 2012
- Founder: Pierre and Elie Bernheim
- Defunct: 2020
- Fate: Bankruptcy
- Headquarters: Geneva, Switzerland
- Key people: Pierre Bernheim
- Products: Wristwatches, timing devices/systems, contemporary accessories, Swiss made accessible watches
- Owner: My Maracujá Sàrl
- Website: 88rdr.com

88 Rue du Rhone was an independent brand of Swiss made watches, launched in 2012 by Elie and Pierre Bernheim, grandsons of the Swiss watchmaker Raymond Weil. As of 2020, the watchmaker was no longer in business after being declared bankrupt in November 2016.

The name "Rue du Rhone" was inspired from Geneva's street Rue du Rhône as well as the Rhône that runs through the heart of the city.

== Watch collections ==
88 Rue du Rhone launched its first collection, Double 8 Origin, in 2012, featuring 100 Quartz, Automatic and Chronograph timepieces that range from 29 to 45 mm (1.1 to 1.8 in).

== Promotional activities ==
In 2014, 88 Rue du Rhone was the official watch partner for the Miami International Film Festival.

88 Rue du Rhone was the Official Watch & Timing Partner of the British Academy of Film and Television Arts (BAFTA) and the Miami International Film Festival (MIFF).

88 Rue du Rhone also sponsored the inaugural Past Forward BAFTA Art Exhibition.
