= André Luy =

Swiss organist

André Luy (12 January 1927 – 6 April 2005) was a Swiss classical organist.

== Life ==
Born in Tramelan, Luy attended school in Saint-Imier. After studying at the conservatories of Neuchâtel and Geneva, he was organist at La Chaux-de-Fonds, then at Saint-Imier and Morges.

In 1957, he became organist at the Lausanne Cathedral. He was honorary organist of Lausanne Cathedral from 1992 to 2005.

Luy has given hundreds of recitals and concerts in Europe as well as in North Africa and Japan. He has made several recordings as a soloist or as a partner of the famous trumpet player Maurice André.

Luy also taught at the conservatoire de Lausanne and the Hochschule für Musik Saar on Sarrebruck. He was Doctor honoris causa of the Université de Lausanne. He had notably collaborated with the choirs of Radio Suisse Romande and Pro Arte as well as with the Ensemble vocal et instrumental de Lausanne.

Luy died in Lutry aged 78.
