= Cortébert =

- Municipality
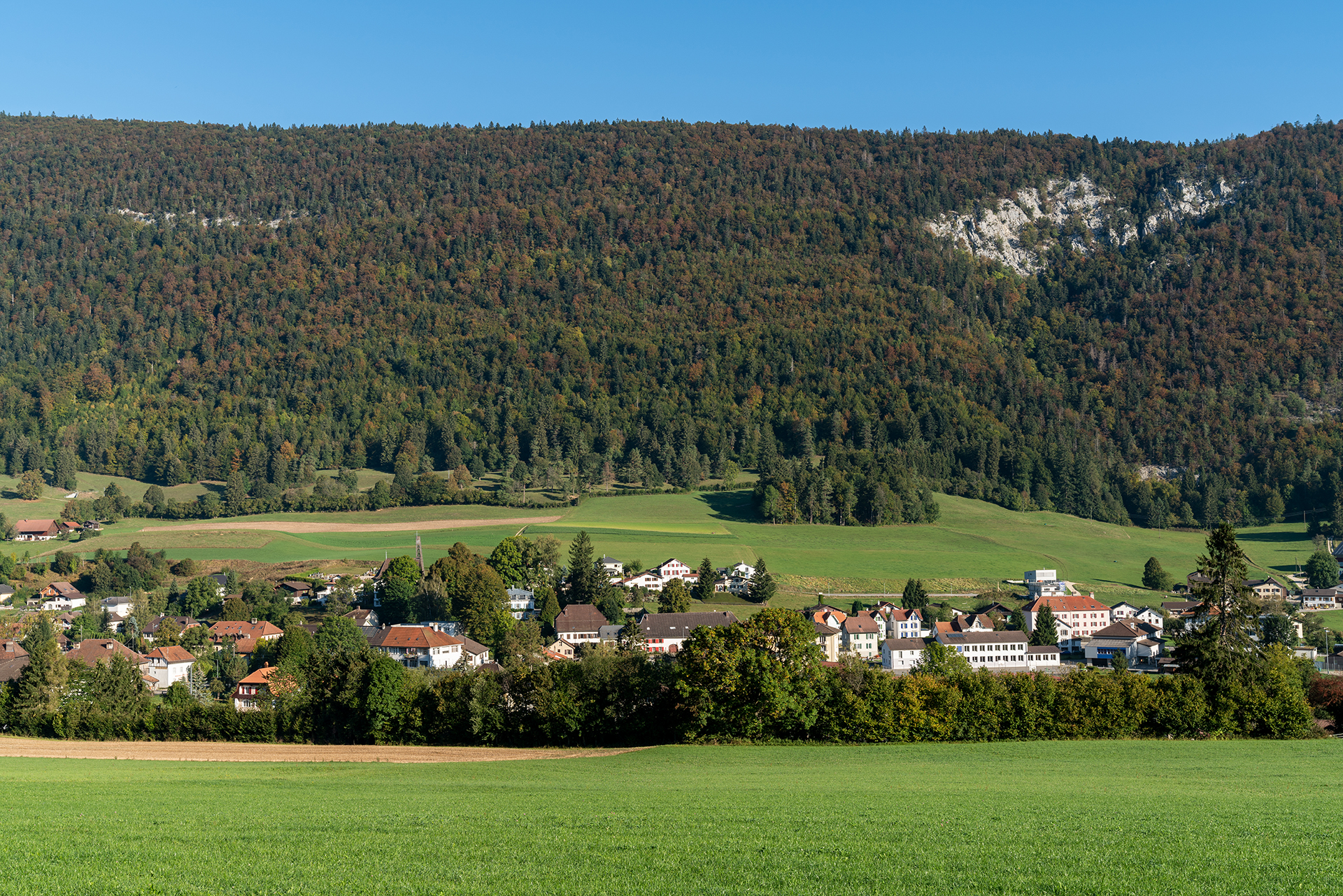

- Flag Coat of arms
- Location of Cortébert
- Location within Switzerland Location within Canton of Bern
- Coordinates: 47°11′N 7°6′E
- Country: Switzerland
- Canton: Bern
- District: Jura bernois

Government
  - Mayor: Maire; Nicolas Bürgi

Area
  - Total: 14.78 km^{2} (5.71 sq mi)
- Elevation: 680 m (2,230 ft)

Population (December 2020)
  - Total: 696
  - Density: 47.1/km^{2} (122/sq mi)
- Time zone: UTC+01:00 (CET)
  - Summer (DST): UTC+02:00 (CEST)
- Postal code: 2607
- SFOS number: 433
- ISO 3166 code: CH-BE
- Surrounded by: Courtelary, Mont-Tramelan, Corgémont, Nods.
- Website: www.cortebert.ch

Cortébert is a municipality in the Jura bernois administrative district in the canton of Bern in Switzerland. It is located in the French-speaking part of the canton in the Jura Mountains.

== History ==
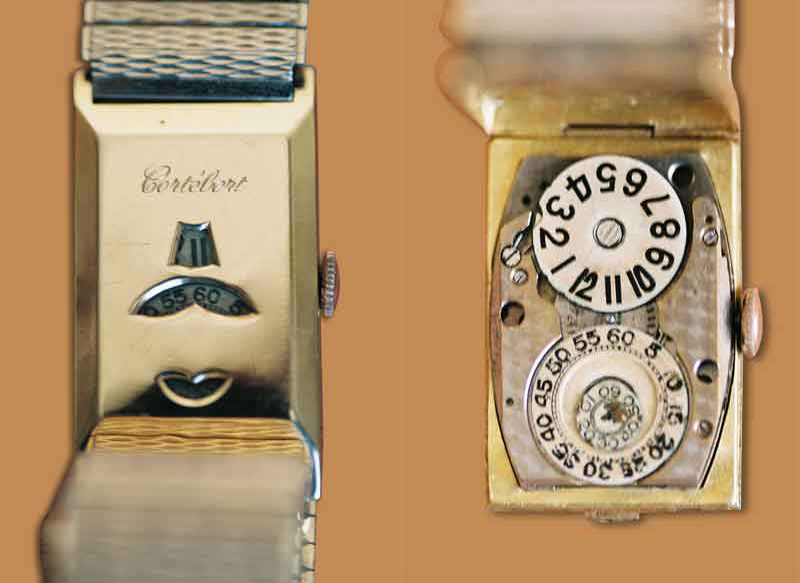
Cortébert jumphour wristwatch from the 1920s

Cortébert is first mentioned in 1178 as Cortaibert.

In 1179 the cathedral chapters of Saint-Imier and Moutier-Grandval are listed as major land owners in Cortébert. The Seignory of Erguel held the village as a fief for the Diocese of Basel.

In 1530 Biel introduced the Protestant Reformation into the parish of Corgémont which included the village of Cortébert.

During the Early Modern era the village had a successful agricultural and small scale handicraft economy. A number of houses and workshops were built during the 16th through 19th century, many of which still exist in the center of the village. In 1865, the watch manufacturer Raiguel Juillard et Cie opened a factory in the village. It was later renamed Cortébert Watch & Co. The watch factory changed the entire socio-economic structure of the village. A village school opened in 1872, though it and the municipal archives were both destroyed in a fire in 1959. A train station opened in 1874, followed by a Reformed chapel in 1902. In 1938 a pumping station was built in the municipality which provided water to the villages in the Franches-Montagnes plateau. However, in the 1930s, during the Great Depression, demand for watches plummeted which devastated the municipal economy. Cortébert Watch struggled to remain in operation until 1962 when it finally closed. In the 1990s, a new industrial and shopping zone was created in the west of the village.

== Geography ==
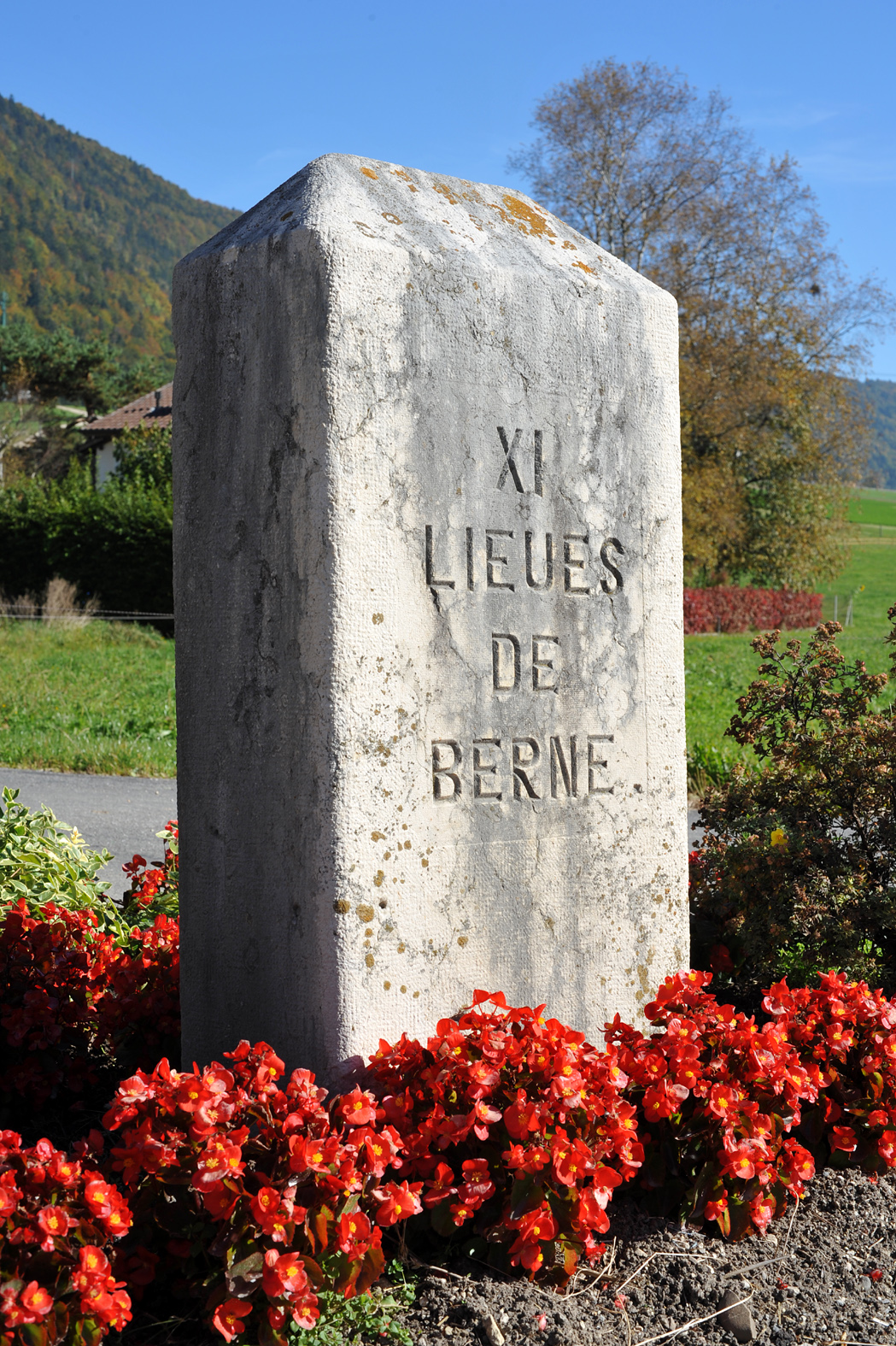
Mileage stone in Cortébert, "Eleven hours from Bern"

Aerial view by Walter Mittelholzer (1925)

Cortébert has an area of 14.76 km^{2} (5.70 sq mi). Of this area, 7.28 km^{2} (2.81 mi^{2}) or 49.3% is used for agricultural purposes, while 7.05 km^{2} (2.72 mi^{2}) or 47.7% is forested. Of the rest of the land, 0.47 km^{2} (0.18 mi^{2}) or 3.2% is settled (buildings or roads) and 0.02 km^{2} (4.9 acres) or 0.1% is unproductive land.

Of the built up area, housing and buildings made up 1.4% and transportation infrastructure made up 1.4%. Out of the forested land, 42.2% of the total land area is heavily forested and 5.5% is covered with orchards or small clusters of trees. Of the agricultural land, 13.3% is used for growing crops and 9.1% is pastures and 26.8% is used for alpine pastures.

It consists of the village of Cortébert and the hamlet of Prés de Cortébert.

On 31 December 2009 District de Courtelary, the municipality's former district, was dissolved. On the following day, 1 January 2010, it joined the newly created Arrondissement administratif Jura bernois.

== Coat of arms ==
The blazon of the municipal coat of arms is Argent on a Bend wavy Azure a Trout of the first. The trout symbolizes the numerous fish of the nearby Suze river.

== Demographics ==
Cortébert has a population (as of December 2020) of 696. As of 2010, 10.8% of the population are resident foreign nationals. Over the last 10 years (2000–2010) the population has changed at a rate of -2.9%. Migration accounted for -4.8%, while births and deaths accounted for 2.6%.

Most of the population (as of 2000) speaks French (527 or 73.8%) as their first language, German is the second most common (133 or 18.6%) and Italian is the third (23 or 3.2%). There is 1 person who speaks Romansh.

As of 2008, the population was 51.8% male and 48.2% female. The population was made up of 322 Swiss men (45.8% of the population) and 42 (6.0%) non-Swiss men. There were 305 Swiss women (43.4%) and 34 (4.8%) non-Swiss women. Of the population in the municipality, 206 or about 28.9% were born in Cortébert and lived there in 2000. There were 228 or 31.9% who were born in the same canton, while 124 or 17.4% were born somewhere else in Switzerland, and 125 or 17.5% were born outside of Switzerland.

As of 2010, children and teenagers (0–19 years old) make up 22.2% of the population, while adults (20–64 years old) make up 60.7% and seniors (over 64 years old) make up 17.1%.

As of 2000, there were 299 people who were single and never married in the municipality. There were 336 married individuals, 39 widows or widowers and 40 individuals who are divorced.

As of 2000, there were 87 households that consist of only one person and 25 households with five or more people. In 2000, a total of 286 apartments (84.4% of the total) were permanently occupied, while 31 apartments (9.1%) were seasonally occupied and 22 apartments (6.5%) were empty. The vacancy rate for the municipality, in 2011, was 4.14%.

The historical population is given in the following chart:

== Sights ==
The entire village of Cortébert is designated as part of the Inventory of Swiss Heritage Sites.

== Politics ==
In the 2011 federal election the most popular party was the Swiss People's Party (SVP) which received 35.2% of the vote. The next three most popular parties were the Social Democratic Party (SP) (23.3%), the Green Party (10.8%) and the FDP.The Liberals (7.9%). In the federal election, a total of 178 votes were cast, and the voter turnout was 35.7%.

== Economy ==
As of 2011, Cortébert had an unemployment rate of 2.2%. As of 2008, there were a total of 186 people employed in the municipality. Of these, there were 50 people employed in the primary economic sector and about 18 businesses involved in this sector. 50 people were employed in the secondary sector and there were 8 businesses in this sector. 86 people were employed in the tertiary sector, with 22 businesses in this sector.

In 2008 there were a total of 135 full-time equivalent jobs. The number of jobs in the primary sector was 29, all of which were in agriculture. The number of jobs in the secondary sector was 46 of which 33 or (71.7%) were in manufacturing and 14 (30.4%) were in construction. The number of jobs in the tertiary sector was 60. In the tertiary sector; 16 or 26.7% were in wholesale or retail sales or the repair of motor vehicles, 3 or 5.0% were in the movement and storage of goods, 14 or 23.3% were in a hotel or restaurant, 1 was in the information industry, 5 or 8.3% were in education and 17 or 28.3% were in health care.

In 2000, there were 32 workers who commuted into the municipality and 272 workers who commuted away. The municipality is a net exporter of workers, with about 8.5 workers leaving the municipality for every one entering. Of the working population, 17.1% used public transportation to get to work, and 58.1% used a private car.

== Religion ==
From the 2000 census, 186 or 26.1% were Roman Catholic, while 361 or 50.6% belonged to the Swiss Reformed Church. Of the rest of the population, there were 2 members of an Orthodox church (or about 0.28% of the population), there were 4 individuals (or about 0.56% of the population) who belonged to the Christian Catholic Church, and there were 69 individuals (or about 9.66% of the population) who belonged to another Christian church. There were 24 (or about 3.36% of the population) who were Islamic. There were 6 individuals who were Buddhist and 1 individual who belonged to another church. 74 (or about 10.36% of the population) belonged to no church, are agnostic or atheist, and 21 individuals (or about 2.94% of the population) did not answer the question.

== Education ==
In Cortébert about 262 or (36.7%) of the population have completed non-mandatory upper secondary education, and 52 or (7.3%) have completed additional higher education (either university or a Fachhochschule). Of the 52 who completed tertiary schooling, 59.6% were Swiss men, 26.9% were Swiss women.

The Canton of Bern school system provides one year of non-obligatory Kindergarten, followed by six years of Primary school. This is followed by three years of obligatory lower Secondary school where the students are separated according to ability and aptitude. Following the lower Secondary students may attend additional schooling or they may enter an apprenticeship.

During the 2010–11 school year, there were a total of 61 students attending classes in Cortébert. There was one kindergarten class with a total of 9 students in the municipality. Of the kindergarten students, and 22.2% have a different mother language than the classroom language. The municipality had 3 primary classes and 51 students. Of the primary students, 3.9% were permanent or temporary residents of Switzerland (not citizens) and 35.3% have a different mother language than the classroom language. During the same year, there was one lower secondary class with a total of one student. and 100.0% have a different mother language than the classroom language.

As of 2000, there were 2 students in Cortébert who came from another municipality, while 45 residents attended schools outside the municipality.

Cortébert is home to the Bibliothèque communale de Cortébert library. The library has (as of 2008) 1,849 books or other media, and loaned out 1,518 items in the same year. It was open a total of 38 days with average of 1 hours per week during that year.

== Transportation ==
The municipality has a railway station, Cortébert. The station is located on the Biel/Bienne–La Chaux-de-Fonds line and has hourly service to Biel/Bienne and La Chaux-de-Fonds.
