= Dimier =

Dimier is a surname. Notable people with the surname include:

- Abel Dimier (1794–1864), French sculptor
- Aurelia Dimier (1827–?), French ballet dancer
- Louis Dimier (1865–1943), French art historian and royalist
- Yves Dimier (born 1969), French alpine skier
