= List of members of the Federal Assembly from the Canton of Neuchâtel =

Coat of Arms

This is a list of members of both houses of the Federal Assembly from the Canton of Neuchatel.

== Members of the Council of States ==
Councillor (Party)	Election	Councillor (Party)
Charles Louis Jeanrenaud; Free Democratic Party; 1848–1854	Appointed	Gonzalve A. H. Petitpierre; Free Democratic Party; 1848–1853
Charles Louis Jeanrenaud; Free Democratic Party; 1848–1854	Appointed	Aimé Challandes; Free Democratic Party; 1853–1854
Aimé Humbert-Droz; Free Democratic Party; 1854–1856	Appointed	D. Frédéric Verdan; Free Democratic Party; 1854–1855
Aimé Humbert-Droz; Free Democratic Party; 1854–1856	Appointed	Auguste Lambelet; Free Democratic Party; 1855–1856
Louis Denzler; Indépendant (rad.diss.) (GE); 1856–1856	Appointed	Jules Philippin; Free Democratic Party; 1856–1860
Aimé Humbert-Droz; Free Democratic Party; 1857–1860	Appointed	Jules Philippin; Free Democratic Party; 1856–1860
Louis Denzler; Indépendant (rad.diss.) (GE); 1860–1865	Appointed	Aimé Humbert-Droz; Free Democratic Party; 1860–1862
Louis Denzler; Indépendant (rad.diss.) (GE); 1860–1865	Appointed	Ariste Lesquereux; Free Democratic Party; 1862–1863
Louis Denzler; Indépendant (rad.diss.) (GE); 1860–1865	Appointed	Louis H. Brandt; Free Democratic Party; 1863–1864
Louis Denzler; Indépendant (rad.diss.) (GE); 1860–1865	Appointed	Henri-Pierre Jacottet; Liberal Party; 1864–1865
Victor Eugène Borel; Free Democratic Party; 1865–1872	Appointed	Aimé Humbert-Droz; Free Democratic Party; 1865–1866
Victor Eugène Borel; Free Democratic Party; 1865–1872	Appointed	P. J. Edouard Desor; Free Democratic Party; 1866–1867
Victor Eugène Borel; Free Democratic Party; 1865–1872	Appointed	Augste G. A. Cornaz; Free Democratic Party; 1867–1868
Victor Eugène Borel; Free Democratic Party; 1865–1872	Appointed	P. J. Edouard Desor; Free Democratic Party; 1868–1869
Victor Eugène Borel; Free Democratic Party; 1865–1872	Appointed	Jules Grandjean; Free Democratic Party; 1869–1871
Victor Eugène Borel; Free Democratic Party; 1865–1872	Appointed	Fritz Berthoud; Free Democratic Party; 1871–1872
Numa Droz; Free Democratic Party; 1872–1875	Appointed	Marcelin Jeanrenaud; Free Democratic Party; 1872–1874
Numa Droz; Free Democratic Party; 1872–1875	Appointed	P. Gustave Virchaux; Free Democratic Party; 1874–1875
A. Frédéric E. Soguel; Free Democratic Party; 1875–1876	Appointed	P. Gustave Virchaux; Free Democratic Party; 1874–1875
Augste G. A. Cornaz; Free Democratic Party; 1876–1893	Appointed	Henri Morel; Free Democratic Party; 1876–1880
Augste G. A. Cornaz; Free Democratic Party; 1876–1893	Appointed	Auguste Alb. Leuba; Free Democratic Party; 1880–1881
Augste G. A. Cornaz; Free Democratic Party; 1876–1893	Appointed	Louis Alex. Martin; Free Democratic Party; 1881–1883
Augste G. A. Cornaz; Free Democratic Party; 1876–1893	Appointed	Jean Ed. Berthoud; Free Democratic Party; 1883–1889
Augste G. A. Cornaz; Free Democratic Party; 1876–1893	Appointed	J. Arnold Robert; Free Democratic Party; 1889–1913
Frédéric A. Monnier; Free Democratic Party; 1893–1896	Appointed	J. Arnold Robert; Free Democratic Party; 1889–1913
Jean Ed. Berthoud; Free Democratic Party; 1896–1908	Appointed	J. Arnold Robert; Free Democratic Party; 1889–1913
Auguste H. Pettavel; Free Democratic Party; 1908–1921	Appointed	J. Arnold Robert; Free Democratic Party; 1889–1913
Auguste H. Pettavel; Free Democratic Party; 1908–1921	Appointed	Paul Robert; Liberal Party; 1913–1916
Auguste H. Pettavel; Free Democratic Party; 1908–1921	Appointed	H. Pierre de Meuron; Liberal Party; 1916–1934
Ernest Béguin; Free Democratic Party; 1921–1942	Appointed	H. Pierre de Meuron; Liberal Party; 1916–1934
Ernest Béguin; Free Democratic Party; 1921–1942	Appointed	Marcel de Coulon; Liberal Party; 1934–1945
Max Petitpierre; Free Democratic Party; 1942–1944	Appointed	Marcel de Coulon; Liberal Party; 1934–1945
Jean-Louis Barrelet; Free Democratic Party; 1945–1969	Appointed	Fritz Henry Eymann; Social Democratic Party; 1945–1949
Jean-Louis Barrelet; Free Democratic Party; 1945–1969	Appointed	Sydney de Coulon; Liberal Party; 1949–1963
Jean-Louis Barrelet; Free Democratic Party; 1945–1969	1951	Sydney de Coulon; Liberal Party; 1949–1963
Jean-Louis Barrelet; Free Democratic Party; 1945–1969	1955	Sydney de Coulon; Liberal Party; 1949–1963
Jean-Louis Barrelet; Free Democratic Party; 1945–1969	1959	Sydney de Coulon; Liberal Party; 1949–1963
Jean-Louis Barrelet; Free Democratic Party; 1945–1969	1963	Blaise Clerc; Liberal Party; 1963–1971
Jean-Louis Barrelet; Free Democratic Party; 1945–1969	1967	Blaise Clerc; Liberal Party; 1963–1971
Carlos Grosjean; Free Democratic Party; 1969–1979	1969	Blaise Clerc; Liberal Party; 1963–1971
Carlos Grosjean; Free Democratic Party; 1969–1979	1971	Pierre Aubert; Social Democratic Party; 1971–1977
Carlos Grosjean; Free Democratic Party; 1969–1979	1975	Pierre Aubert; Social Democratic Party; 1971–1977
Carlos Grosjean; Free Democratic Party; 1969–1979	1978	René Meylan; Social Democratic Party; 1978–1987
Jean-François Aubert; Liberal Party; 1979–1987	1979	René Meylan; Social Democratic Party; 1978–1987
Jean-François Aubert; Liberal Party; 1979–1987	1983	René Meylan; Social Democratic Party; 1978–1987
Jean Cavadini; Liberal Party; 1987–1999	1987	Thierry Béguin; Free Democratic Party; 1987–1999
Jean Cavadini; Liberal Party; 1987–1999	1991	Thierry Béguin; Free Democratic Party; 1987–1999
Jean Cavadini; Liberal Party; 1987–1999	1995	Thierry Béguin; Free Democratic Party; 1987–1999
Jean Studer; Social Democratic Party; 1999–2005	1999	Michèle-Irène Berger; Free Democratic Party; 1999–2003
Jean Studer; Social Democratic Party; 1999–2005	2003	Gisèle Ory; Social Democratic Party; 2003–2009
Pierre Bonhôte; Social Democratic Party; 2005–2007	2005	Gisèle Ory; Social Democratic Party; 2003–2009
Didier Burkhalter; Free Democratic Party; 2007–2009; FDP.The Liberals; 2009-2019	2007	Gisèle Ory; Social Democratic Party; 2003–2009
Didier Burkhalter; Free Democratic Party; 2007–2009; FDP.The Liberals; 2009-2019	2009	Gisèle Ory; Social Democratic Party; 2003–2009
Didier Burkhalter; Free Democratic Party; 2007–2009; FDP.The Liberals; 2009-2019	2010	Raphaël Comte; FDP.The Liberals; 2010–2019
Didier Burkhalter; Free Democratic Party; 2007–2009; FDP.The Liberals; 2009-2019	2011	Raphaël Comte; FDP.The Liberals; 2010–2019
Didier Burkhalter; Free Democratic Party; 2007–2009; FDP.The Liberals; 2009-2019	2015	Raphaël Comte; FDP.The Liberals; 2010–2019
Céline Vara; Green Party; 2019–present	2019	Phillippe Bauer; FDP.The Liberals; 2019–present
Céline Vara; Green Party; 2019–present	2023	Baptiste Hurni; Social Democratic Party; 2023–present

== Members of the National Council ==
Election	Councillor (Party)	Councillor (Party)	Councillor (Party)	Councillor (Party)	Councillor (Party)	Councillor (Party)	Councillor (Party)	Councillor (Party)
1848	L. Eugène Favre (FDP/PRD)	Frédéric Lambelet (FDP/PRD)	Jules Matthey (FDP/PRD)	3 seats 1848–1851				
1849	L. Eugène Favre (FDP/PRD)	Frédéric Lambelet (FDP/PRD)	Amédor Humbert (FDP/PRD)	3 seats 1848–1851				
1851	Frédéric A. Courvoisier (FDP/PRD)	Frédéric Lambelet (FDP/PRD)	J. Auguste Rougemont (FDP/PRD)	P. Hugues Thomas (FDP/PRD)	4 seats 1851–1872			
1854	Charles-Jules Matthey (FDP/PRD)	Alexis Marie Piaget (FDP/PRD)	Frédéric Auguste Zuberbühler (FDP/PRD)	P. Hugues Thomas (FDP/PRD)	4 seats 1851–1872			
1855	Charles-Jules Matthey (FDP/PRD)	Alexis Marie Piaget (FDP/PRD)	Frédéric Auguste Zuberbühler (FDP/PRD)	Frédéric Lambelet (FDP/PRD)	4 seats 1851–1872			
1857	Henri Grandjean (FDP/PRD)	Alexis Marie Piaget (FDP/PRD)	Gustave-Albert Irlet (FDP/PRD)	Louis Constant Lambelet (Liberal)	4 seats 1851–1872			
1860	Ami Girard (FDP/PRD)	Alexis Marie Piaget (FDP/PRD)	Louis Grandpierre (FDP/PRD)	Jules Philippin (FDP/PRD)	4 seats 1851–1872			
1863	Ami Girard (FDP/PRD)	Alexis Marie Piaget (FDP/PRD)	Louis Grandpierre (FDP/PRD)	Jules Philippin (FDP/PRD)	4 seats 1851–1872			
1866	Ami Girard (FDP/PRD)	Alexis Marie Piaget (FDP/PRD)	Henri Grandjean (FDP/PRD)	Jules Philippin (FDP/PRD)	4 seats 1851–1872			
1869	P. J. Edouard Desor (FDP/PRD)	Louis Constant Lambelet (Liberal)	Zélim Perret (FDP/PRD)	Jules Philippin (FDP/PRD)	4 seats 1851–1872			
1872	P. J. Edouard Desor (FDP/PRD)	Louis Constant Lambelet (Liberal)	Zélim Perret (FDP/PRD)	Jules Philippin (FDP/PRD)	Fritz Berthoud (FDP/PRD)	5 seats 1872–1902		
1875	P. J. Edouard Desor (FDP/PRD)	Louis Constant Lambelet (Liberal)	J. Fritz Rüsser (FDP/PRD)	Jules Philippin (FDP/PRD)	Fritz Berthoud (FDP/PRD)	5 seats 1872–1902		
1878	L. Arnold Grosjean (FDP/PRD)	Louis Constant Lambelet (Liberal)	Louis Alex. Martin (FDP/PRD)	Jules Philippin (FDP/PRD)	Charles Alfred Petitpierre (FDP/PRD)	5 seats 1872–1902		
1880	L. Arnold Grosjean (FDP/PRD)	Louis Constant Lambelet (Liberal)	Louis Alex. Martin (FDP/PRD)	Jules Philippin (FDP/PRD)	Henri Morel (FDP/PRD)	5 seats 1872–1902		
1881	L. Arnold Grosjean (FDP/PRD)	Auguste Alb. Leuba (FDP/PRD)	Charles Emile Tissot (FDP/PRD)	Jules Philippin (FDP/PRD)	Henri Morel (FDP/PRD)	5 seats 1872–1902		
1883	L. Arnold Grosjean (FDP/PRD)	Auguste Alb. Leuba (FDP/PRD)	Charles Emile Tissot (FDP/PRD)	H. Robert Comtesse (FDP/PRD)	Henri Morel (FDP/PRD)	5 seats 1872–1902		
1884	L. Arnold Grosjean (FDP/PRD)	Louis Edouard Coulin (FDP/PRD)	Charles Emile Tissot (FDP/PRD)	H. Robert Comtesse (FDP/PRD)	Henri Morel (FDP/PRD)	5 seats 1872–1902		
1885	L. Arnold Grosjean (FDP/PRD)	Henri-Louis Henry (FDP/PRD)	Charles Emile Tissot (FDP/PRD)	H. Robert Comtesse (FDP/PRD)	Henri Morel (FDP/PRD)	5 seats 1872–1902		
1887	L. Arnold Grosjean (FDP/PRD)	Henri-Louis Henry (FDP/PRD)	Charles Emile Tissot (FDP/PRD)	H. Robert Comtesse (FDP/PRD)	Henri Morel (FDP/PRD)	5 seats 1872–1902		
1888	L. Arnold Grosjean (FDP/PRD)	Paul-Louis Ducommun (FDP/PRD)	Charles Emile Tissot (FDP/PRD)	H. Robert Comtesse (FDP/PRD)	Alfred Jeanhenry (FDP/PRD)	5 seats 1872–1902		
1890	L. Arnold Grosjean (FDP/PRD)	Paul-Louis Ducommun (FDP/PRD)	Charles Emile Tissot (FDP/PRD)	H. Robert Comtesse (FDP/PRD)	Alfred Jeanhenry (FDP/PRD)	5 seats 1872–1902		
1891	L. Arnold Grosjean (FDP/PRD)	Louis Alex. Martin (FDP/PRD)	Charles Emile Tissot (FDP/PRD)	H. Robert Comtesse (FDP/PRD)	Alfred Jeanhenry (FDP/PRD)	5 seats 1872–1902		
1893	Donatien Ph. A. A. Fer (FDP/PRD)	Louis Alex. Martin (FDP/PRD)	Charles Emile Tissot (FDP/PRD)	H. Robert Comtesse (FDP/PRD)	Alfred Jeanhenry (FDP/PRD)	5 seats 1872–1902		
1895	Jules Aug. Calame (LPS/PLS)	Louis Alex. Martin (FDP/PRD)	Charles Emile Tissot (FDP/PRD)	H. Robert Comtesse (FDP/PRD)	Alfred Jeanhenry (FDP/PRD)	5 seats 1872–1902		
1896	Jules Aug. Calame (LPS/PLS)	Louis Alex. Martin (FDP/PRD)	Charles Emile Tissot (FDP/PRD)	H. Robert Comtesse (FDP/PRD)	Alfred Jeanhenry (FDP/PRD)	5 seats 1872–1902		
1899	Jules Aug. Calame (LPS/PLS)	Louis Alex. Martin (FDP/PRD)	J. Albert Piguet (FDP/PRD)	H. Robert Comtesse (FDP/PRD)	Alfred Jeanhenry (FDP/PRD)	5 seats 1872–1902		
1900	Jules Aug. Calame (LPS/PLS)	Louis Alex. Martin (FDP/PRD)	J. Albert Piguet (FDP/PRD)	Paul E. Mosimann (FDP/PRD)	Alfred Jeanhenry (FDP/PRD)	5 seats 1872–1902		
1902	Jules Aug. Calame (LPS/PLS)	Louis Alex. Martin (FDP/PRD)	J. Albert Piguet (FDP/PRD)	Paul E. Mosimann (FDP/PRD)	F. F. Louis Perrier (FDP/PRD)	A. Frédéric E. Soguel (FDP/PRD)	6 seats 1902–1911	
1904	Jules Aug. Calame (LPS/PLS)	Louis Alex. Martin (FDP/PRD)	J. Albert Piguet (FDP/PRD)	Paul E. Mosimann (FDP/PRD)	F. F. Louis Perrier (FDP/PRD)	Henri W. Calame (FDP/PRD)	6 seats 1902–1911	
1905	Jules Aug. Calame (LPS/PLS)	Louis Alex. Martin (FDP/PRD)	J. Albert Piguet (FDP/PRD)	Paul E. Mosimann (FDP/PRD)	F. F. Louis Perrier (FDP/PRD)	Henri W. Calame (FDP/PRD)	6 seats 1902–1911	
1908	Jules Aug. Calame (LPS/PLS)	Louis Alex. Martin (FDP/PRD)	J. Albert Piguet (FDP/PRD)	Paul E. Mosimann (FDP/PRD)	F. F. Louis Perrier (FDP/PRD)	Henri W. Calame (FDP/PRD)	6 seats 1902–1911	
1911	Jules Aug. Calame (LPS/PLS)	Louis Alex. Martin (FDP/PRD)	J. Albert Piguet (FDP/PRD)	Paul E. Mosimann (FDP/PRD)	F. F. Louis Perrier (FDP/PRD)	Henri W. Calame (FDP/PRD)	Charles-Théophile Naine (SP/PS)	7 seats 1911–1922
1912	S. A. Eugène Bonhôte (LPS/PLS)	Louis Alex. Martin (FDP/PRD)	J. Albert Piguet (FDP/PRD)	Paul E. Mosimann (FDP/PRD)	Ernest-Paul Graber (SP/PS)	Henri W. Calame (FDP/PRD)	Charles-Théophile Naine (SP/PS)	7 seats 1911–1922
1913	S. A. Eugène Bonhôte (LPS/PLS)	F. Auguste Leuba (FDP/PRD)	J. Albert Piguet (FDP/PRD)	Paul E. Mosimann (FDP/PRD)	Ernest-Paul Graber (SP/PS)	Henri W. Calame (FDP/PRD)	Charles-Théophile Naine (SP/PS)	7 seats 1911–1922
1914	S. A. Eugène Bonhôte (LPS/PLS)	F. Auguste Leuba (FDP/PRD)	J. Albert Piguet (FDP/PRD)	Paul E. Mosimann (FDP/PRD)	Ernest-Paul Graber (SP/PS)	Henri W. Calame (FDP/PRD)	Charles-Théophile Naine (SP/PS)	7 seats 1911–1922
1917	S. A. Eugène Bonhôte (LPS/PLS)	F. Auguste Leuba (FDP/PRD)	Otto A. de Dardel (LPS/PLS)	Paul E. Mosimann (FDP/PRD)	Ernest-Paul Graber (SP/PS)	Henri W. Calame (FDP/PRD)	Charles-Théophile Naine (SP/PS)	7 seats 1911–1922
1919	S. A. Eugène Bonhôte (LPS/PLS)	Philippe-Henri Berger (SP/PS)	Otto A. de Dardel (LPS/PLS)	Paul E. Mosimann (FDP/PRD)	Ernest-Paul Graber (SP/PS)	Henri W. Calame (FDP/PRD)	Fritz Henry Eymann (SP/PS)	7 seats 1911–1922
1922	S. A. Eugène Bonhôte (LPS/PLS)	Philippe-Henri Berger (SP/PS)	Otto A. de Dardel (LPS/PLS)	Paul E. Mosimann (FDP/PRD)	Ernest-Paul Graber (SP/PS)	Henri W. Calame (FDP/PRD)	Fritz Henry Eymann (SP/PS)	Arnold Bolle (PPN)
1923	S. A. Eugène Bonhôte (LPS/PLS)	Philippe-Henri Berger (SP/PS)	Otto A. de Dardel (LPS/PLS)	Henri Berthoud (FDP/PRD)	Ernest-Paul Graber (SP/PS)	Henri W. Calame (FDP/PRD)	Fritz Henry Eymann (SP/PS)	Arnold Bolle (PPN)
1924	Paul Borel (LPS/PLS)	Philippe-Henri Berger (SP/PS)	Otto A. de Dardel (LPS/PLS)	Henri Berthoud (FDP/PRD)	Ernest-Paul Graber (SP/PS)	Henri W. Calame (FDP/PRD)	Fritz Henry Eymann (SP/PS)	Arnold Bolle (PPN)
1925	Paul Borel (LPS/PLS)	Philippe-Henri Berger (SP/PS)	Otto A. de Dardel (LPS/PLS)	Henri Berthoud (FDP/PRD)	Ernest-Paul Graber (SP/PS)	Henri W. Calame (FDP/PRD)	Fritz Henry Eymann (SP/PS)	Arnold Bolle (PPN)
1927	Pierre-Frédéric Favarger (LPS/PLS)	Philippe-Henri Berger (SP/PS)	Otto A. de Dardel (LPS/PLS)	Henri Berthoud (FDP/PRD)	Ernest-Paul Graber (SP/PS)	Henri W. Calame (FDP/PRD)	Fritz Henry Eymann (SP/PS)	Arnold Bolle (PPN)
1928	Pierre-Frédéric Favarger (LPS/PLS)	Henri Perret (SP/PS)	Albert Rais (FDP/PRD)	7 seats 1928–1931	Ernest-Paul Graber (SP/PS)	Henri W. Calame (FDP/PRD)	Fritz Henry Eymann (SP/PS)	Arnold Bolle (PPN)
1931	Henri Berthoud (FDP/PRD)	Henri Perret (SP/PS)	Albert Rais (FDP/PRD)	6 seats 1931–1943	Ernest-Paul Graber (SP/PS)	Alfred Clottu (LPS/PLS)	Fritz Henry Eymann (SP/PS)	6 seats 1931–1943
1933	Henri Berthoud (FDP/PRD)	Henri Perret (SP/PS)	Albert Rais (FDP/PRD)	6 seats 1931–1943	Ernest-Paul Graber (SP/PS)	Marcel-René Krügel (LPS/PLS)	Fritz Henry Eymann (SP/PS)	6 seats 1931–1943
1935	Henri Berthoud (FDP/PRD)	Henri Perret (SP/PS)	Albert Rais (FDP/PRD)	6 seats 1931–1943	Ernest-Paul Graber (SP/PS)	Marcel-René Krügel (LPS/PLS)	René Robert (SP/PS)	6 seats 1931–1943
1939	Henri Berthoud (FDP/PRD)	Henri Perret (SP/PS)	Albert Rais (FDP/PRD)	6 seats 1931–1943	Ernest-Paul Graber (SP/PS)	Marcel-René Krügel (LPS/PLS)	René Robert (SP/PS)	6 seats 1931–1943
1940	Henri Berthoud (FDP/PRD)	Henri Perret (SP/PS)	Albert Rais (FDP/PRD)	6 seats 1931–1943	Ernest-Paul Graber (SP/PS)	Jean Humbert (LPS/PLS)	René Robert (SP/PS)	6 seats 1931–1943
1943	Henri Berthoud (FDP/PRD)	Henri Perret (SP/PS)	Tell Perrin (FDP/PRD)	5 seats 1943–2015		Jean Humbert (LPS/PLS)	René Robert (SP/PS)	5 seats 1943–2015
1946	Henri Berthoud (FDP/PRD)	Henri Perret (SP/PS)	Tell Perrin (FDP/PRD)	5 seats 1943–2015		Julien Girard (LPS/PLS)	René Robert (SP/PS)	5 seats 1943–2015
1947	Sydney de Coulon (LPS/PLS)	Henri Perret (SP/PS)	Tell Perrin (FDP/PRD)	5 seats 1943–2015		Paul-René Rosset (FDP/PRD)	René Robert (SP/PS)	5 seats 1943–2015
1949	André Petitpierre (LPS/PLS)	Henri Perret (SP/PS)	Tell Perrin (FDP/PRD)	5 seats 1943–2015		Paul-René Rosset (FDP/PRD)	René Robert (SP/PS)	5 seats 1943–2015
1951	Gaston Clottu (LPS/PLS)	Henri Perret (SP/PS)	Tell Perrin (FDP/PRD)	5 seats 1943–2015		Paul-René Rosset (FDP/PRD)	Adolphe Graedel (SP/PS)	5 seats 1943–2015
1955	Gaston Clottu (LPS/PLS)	Claude Berger (SP/PS)	Adrien Favre-Bulle (FDP/PRD)	5 seats 1943–2015		Paul-René Rosset (FDP/PRD)	Adolphe Graedel (SP/PS)	5 seats 1943–2015
1959	Gaston Clottu (LPS/PLS)	Claude Berger (SP/PS)	Adrien Favre-Bulle (FDP/PRD)	5 seats 1943–2015		Paul-René Rosset (FDP/PRD)	Adolphe Graedel (SP/PS)	5 seats 1943–2015
1963	Gaston Clottu (LPS/PLS)	Claude Berger (SP/PS)	Adrien Favre-Bulle (FDP/PRD)	5 seats 1943–2015		Paul-René Rosset (FDP/PRD)	André Sandoz (SP/PS)	5 seats 1943–2015
1967	Gaston Clottu (LPS/PLS)	Jean-Pierre Dubois (PdA/PST)	Adrien Favre-Bulle (FDP/PRD)	5 seats 1943–2015		René Felber (SP/PS)	André Sandoz (SP/PS)	5 seats 1943–2015
1971	Jean-François Aubert (LPS/PLS)	Tilo Frey (FDP/PRD)	Yann Richter (FDP/PRD)	5 seats 1943–2015		René Felber (SP/PS)	Rémy Schläppy (SP/PS)	5 seats 1943–2015
1975	Jean-François Aubert (LPS/PLS)	Robert Moser (FDP/PRD)	Yann Richter (FDP/PRD)	5 seats 1943–2015		René Felber (SP/PS)	Rémy Schläppy (SP/PS)	5 seats 1943–2015
1977	Jean-François Aubert (LPS/PLS)	Robert Moser (FDP/PRD)	Yann Richter (FDP/PRD)	5 seats 1943–2015		René Felber (SP/PS)	Heidi Deneys (SP/PS)	5 seats 1943–2015
1979	Jean Cavadini (LPS/PLS)	Claude Frey (FDP/PRD)	François Jeanneret (LPS/PLS)	5 seats 1943–2015		René Felber (SP/PS)	Heidi Deneys (SP/PS)	5 seats 1943–2015
1981	Jean Cavadini (LPS/PLS)	Claude Frey (FDP/PRD)	François Jeanneret (LPS/PLS)	5 seats 1943–2015		François Borel (SP/PS)	Heidi Deneys (SP/PS)	5 seats 1943–2015
1983	Jean Cavadini (LPS/PLS)	Claude Frey (FDP/PRD)	François Jeanneret (LPS/PLS)	5 seats 1943–2015		François Borel (SP/PS)	Heidi Deneys (SP/PS)	5 seats 1943–2015
1987	Jean Guinand (LPS/PLS)	Claude Frey (FDP/PRD)	François Jeanneret (LPS/PLS)	5 seats 1943–2015		François Borel (SP/PS)	Francis Matthey (SP/PS)	5 seats 1943–2015
1991	Jean Guinand (LPS/PLS)	Claude Frey (FDP/PRD)	Rémy Scheurer (LPS/PLS)	5 seats 1943–2015		François Borel (SP/PS)	Francis Matthey (SP/PS)	5 seats 1943–2015
1993	Rolf Graber (LPS/PLS)	Claude Frey (FDP/PRD)	Rémy Scheurer (LPS/PLS)	5 seats 1943–2015		François Borel (SP/PS)	Francis Matthey (SP/PS)	5 seats 1943–2015
1995	Daniel Vogel (FDP/PRD)	Claude Frey (FDP/PRD)	Rémy Scheurer (LPS/PLS)	5 seats 1943–2015		François Borel (SP/PS)	Didier Berberat (SP/PS)	5 seats 1943–2015
1999	Fernand Cuche (GPS/PES)	Claude Frey (FDP/PRD)	Rémy Scheurer (LPS/PLS)	5 seats 1943–2015		Valérie Garbani (SP/PS)	Didier Berberat (SP/PS)	5 seats 1943–2015
2003	Fernand Cuche (GPS/PES)	Didier Burkhalter (FDP/PRD)	Yvan Perrin (SVP/UDC)	5 seats 1943–2015		Valérie Garbani (SP/PS)	Didier Berberat (SP/PS)	5 seats 1943–2015
2005	Francine John-Calame (GPS/PES)	Didier Burkhalter (FDP/PRD)	Yvan Perrin (SVP/UDC)	5 seats 1943–2015		Valérie Garbani (SP/PS)	Didier Berberat (SP/PS)	5 seats 1943–2015
2007	Francine John-Calame (GPS/PES)	Laurent Favre (FDP/PRD/ FDP.The Liberals)	Yvan Perrin (SVP/UDC)	5 seats 1943–2015		Sylvie Perrinjaquet (FDP/PRD / FDP.The Liberals)	Didier Berberat (SP/PS)	5 seats 1943–2015
2009	Francine John-Calame (GPS/PES)	Laurent Favre (FDP/PRD/ FDP.The Liberals)	Yvan Perrin (SVP/UDC)	5 seats 1943–2015		Sylvie Perrinjaquet (FDP/PRD / FDP.The Liberals)	Jacques-André Maire (SP/PS)	5 seats 1943–2015
2011	Francine John-Calame (GPS/PES)	Laurent Favre (FDP/PRD/ FDP.The Liberals)	Yvan Perrin (SVP/UDC)	5 seats 1943–2015		Alain Ribaux (FDP.The Liberals)	Jacques-André Maire (SP/PS)	5 seats 1943–2015
2013	Francine John-Calame (GPS/PES)	Laurent Favre (FDP/PRD/ FDP.The Liberals)	Raymond Clottu (SVP/UDC)	5 seats 1943–2015		Sylvie Perrinjaquet (FDP.The Liberals)	Jacques-André Maire (SP/PS)	5 seats 1943–2015
2014	Francine John-Calame (GPS/PES)	Pierre-André Monnard (FDP.The Liberals)	Raymond Clottu (SVP/UDC)	5 seats 1943–2015		Sylvie Perrinjaquet (FDP.The Liberals)	Jacques-André Maire (SP/PS)	5 seats 1943–2015
2015	4 seats 2015-present	Philippe Bauer (FDP.The Liberals)	Raymond Clottu (SVP/UDC)	4 seats 2015-present		Denis de la Reussille (PdA/PST)	Jacques-André Maire (SP/PS)	4 seats 2015-present
2019	4 seats 2015-present	Damien Cottier (FDP.The Liberals)	Fabien Fivaz (GP/PV)	4 seats 2015-present		Denis de la Reussille (PdA/PST)	Baptiste Hurni (SP/PS)	4 seats 2015-present
2023	4 seats 2015-present	Damien Cottier (FDP.The Liberals)	Fabien Fivaz (GP/PV)	4 seats 2015-present		Didier Calame (SVP)	Baptiste Hurni (SP/PS)	4 seats 2015-present
