= Scheurer =

Scheurer is a German surname. Notable people with the surname include:

- Armin Scheurer (1917–1990), Swiss athlete
- Auguste Scheurer-Kestner (1833–1899), French chemist and industrialist
- Karl Scheurer (1872–1927), Swiss politician
- Rémy Scheurer (1934–2026), Swiss politician
- Rudolf Scheurer (1925–2015), Swiss football referee

== See also ==
- Scheuer
