= Heidi Deneys =

Swiss politician (1937–2014)

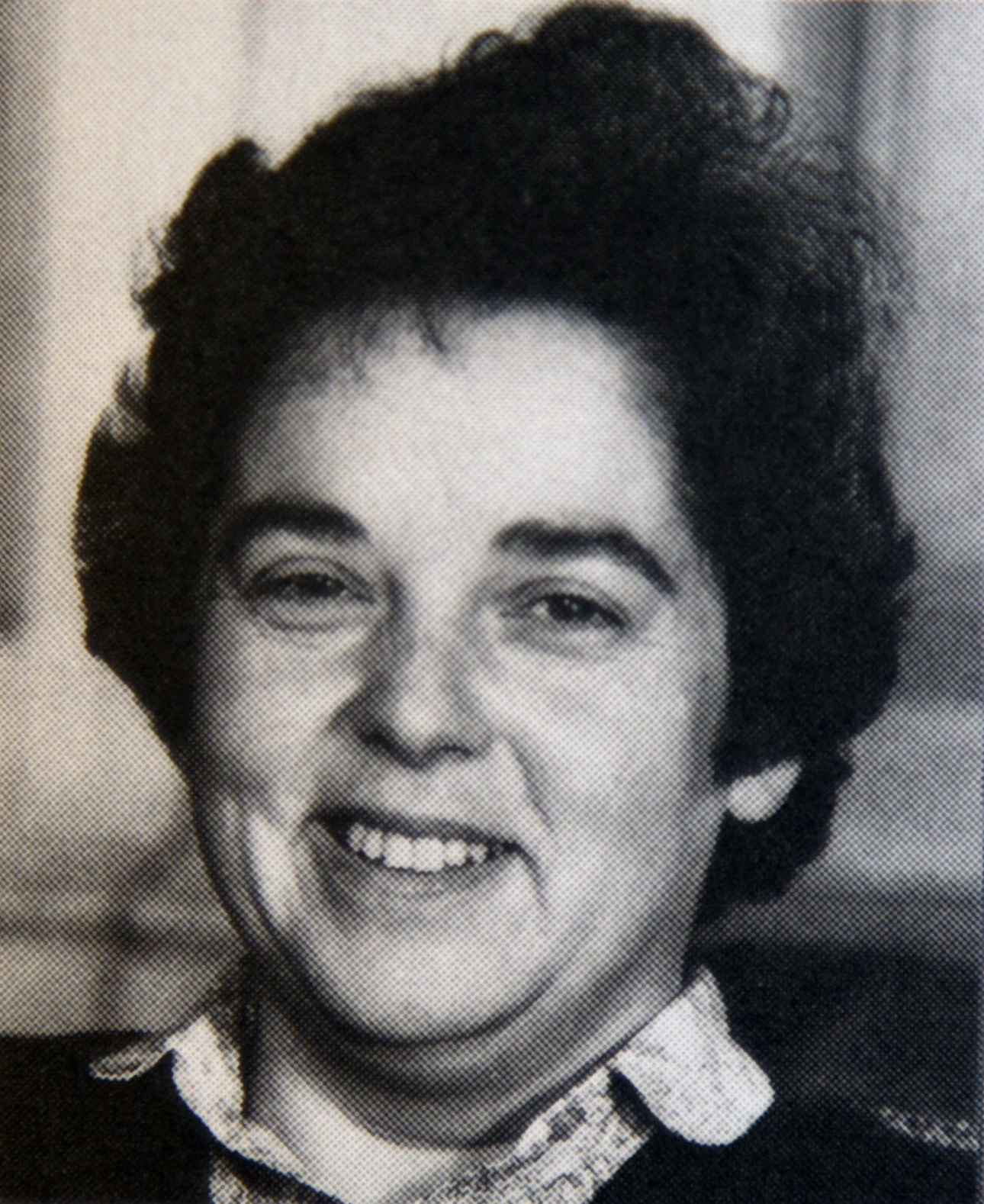
- Born: Heidi Oppliger; May 25, 1937; Saint-Imier, Switzerland
- Died: November 21, 2014 (aged 77); La Chaux-de-Fonds, Switzerland
- Education: University of Neuchâtel
- Occupations: Teacher, politician
- Political party: Socialist Party
- Spouse: Walter Deneys (m. 1965; div. 1967)
- Children: 2

Heidi Deneys (née Oppliger; 25 May 1937 – 21 November 2014) was a Swiss socialist politician who served as a National Councillor from Neuchâtel and became the first woman to preside over a cantonal party in Switzerland when she led the Socialist Party of Neuchâtel from 1972 to 1976.

== Early life and education ==
Heidi Oppliger was born on 25 May 1937 in Saint-Imier to Paul Oppliger, a farmer, and Louise Tanner, who worked as both a farmer and seamstress. She completed her primary education at Mont-Soleil and Saint-Imier before pursuing commercial studies, obtaining her commercial maturité in Neuchâtel in 1957. She continued her higher education at the University of Neuchâtel, earning a degree in social sciences in 1959.

== Teaching career ==
After completing her university studies, Deneys began her teaching career at the secondary school in Saint-Imier from 1960 to 1961. Following the Bizerte Crisis of summer 1961, which opposed France and Tunisia, she moved to North Africa where francophone non-French teachers were particularly sought after. She taught in Tunisia and Niger from 1961 to 1964. During her time in Tunisia, she met Walter Deneys, a Belgian teacher, whom she married in 1965. The couple had two children but divorced in 1967.

In 1965, Deneys returned to Switzerland and became a professor of geography and civic education at the secondary school in La Chaux-de-Fonds, where she remained for the rest of her teaching career.

== Political career ==
=== Early political involvement ===
Deneys was introduced to women's rights issues during her adolescence by her mother. In 1959, she joined the Neuchâtel movement of the Nouvelle gauche socialiste (New Socialist Left), which aimed to achieve "socialist democracy." This movement had a relatively short existence from 1958 to 1963, and through it she worked alongside René Meylan, Raymond Spyra, and Pierre Dubois.

=== Cantonal politics ===
Deneys became a member of the Socialist Party (PS) of Neuchâtel in 1969 and served as its president from 1972 to 1976, making her the first woman to lead a cantonal party in Switzerland. She served on the La Chaux-de-Fonds General Council from 1972 to 1976 and again from 1988 to 1990. At the cantonal level, she was elected to the Grand Council of Neuchâtel for two separate terms: 1973-1981 and 1989-2001.

=== Federal politics ===
Deneys was elected to the National Council in 1977, representing the Canton of Neuchâtel, and served until 1987. During her tenure in the Federal Parliament, she served on several important committees including military affairs, petitions, science and research, and marriage law revision. She served as president of both the public health and environment committee and the management committee.

Her political priorities included advocating for the establishment of civilian service and reducing military spending, supporting scientific research funding, promoting gender equality, and defending abortion rights. She also focused on economic policy issues, particularly supporting innovation for small and medium enterprises, and regional economic development, especially defending marginalized regions.

=== National party roles ===
At the national level, Deneys worked closely with prominent Socialist Party leaders. She served as vice-president of the party from 1986 to 1990 under Helmut Hubacher, and later as the party's central secretary for French-speaking Switzerland from 1990 to 1997 under Peter Bodenmann.

== Other activities ==
Beyond her political career, Deneys was involved in various professional and social organizations. She served as a member of the federal expert commission on human genetics, alongside Eva Segmüller and Lili Nabholz-Haidegger, and chaired the board of directors of the Perreux cantonal psychiatric hospital.

Deneys was particularly active in advocating for retirees and elderly people. She served as vice-president of the board of the Pro Senectute Switzerland foundation from 1994 to 2006, president of the Neuchâtel Association for the Defense and Recreation of Retirees (Avivo) from 2003 to 2012, and co-president, alongside Angeline Fankhauser, of the Swiss umbrella association of retirees (Fares) from 2004 to 2006.

== Publications ==
Deneys authored educational materials during her teaching career, including Géographie de la Suisse. Aspects physiques et humains. Enseignement secondaire, 1ère année classique, scientifique et moderne-préprofessionnelle (Geography of Switzerland: Physical and Human Aspects for Secondary Education, First Year Classical, Scientific and Modern-Pre-professional), published in 1978.

== Death ==
Heidi Deneys died on 21 November 2014 in La Chaux-de-Fonds at the age of 77.

== Bibliography ==
- L'Impartial, 17 September 1985; 4 September 1986; 12 October 1987
- L'Express, 14 February 1987
- L'Impartial/L'Express, 22 September 1999; 26 November 2014
- George, 5 July 2011
- Tribune de Genève, 26 November 2014
- Le Courrier, 1 December 2014
