= Funiculaire Saint-Imier – Mont-Soleil =

Funicular railway in the Jura, Switzerland

Funiculaire Saint-Imier - Mont-Soleil
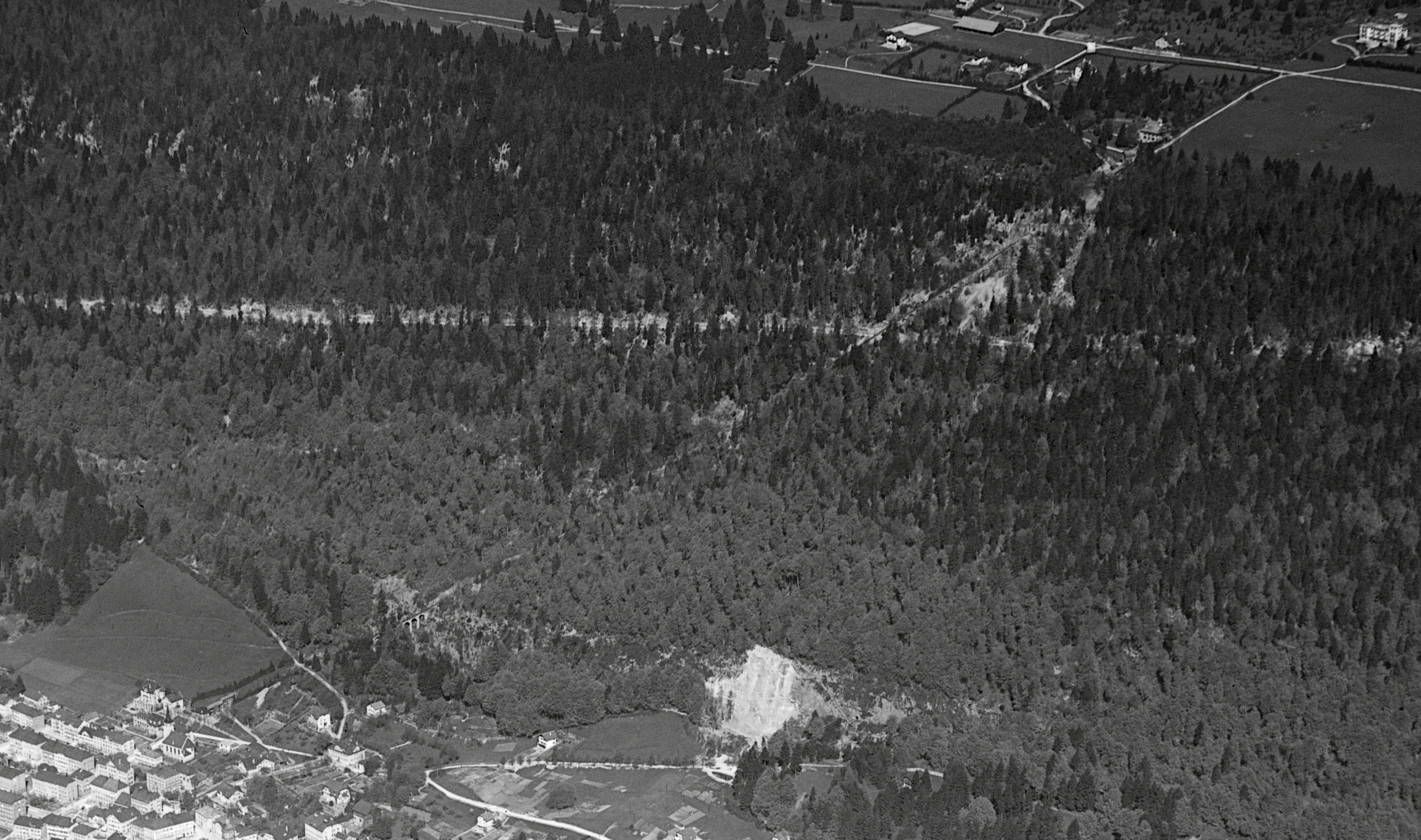
- aerial view (1930)

Overview
- Other name(s): Funisolaire; Chemin de fer funiculaire Saint-Imier - Sonnenberg; Funiculaire du Sonnenberg; Sonnenbergbahn
- Status: In operation
- Owner: Funiculaire Saint-Imier - Mont-Soleil SA
- Locale: Saint-Imier, Switzerland
- Termini: St-Imier (funiculaire) at Rue des Roches 31; Mont-Soleil (funiculaire)
- Stations: 2
- Website: funisolaire.ch

Service
- Type: Funicular
- Operator(s): Funiculaire Saint-Imier - Mont-Soleil SA
- Rolling stock: 1 for 60 persons (since 2003); 2 (before, for 54 persons in 1969)

History
- Opened: 10 August 1903

Technical
- Line length: 743 m (2,438 ft); before 2003: 728 m (2,388 ft)
- Number of tracks: 1 (before 2003: with passing loop)
- Track gauge: 1,000 mm (3 ft 3 3/8 in)
- Operating speed: 5 metres per second (16 ft/s); before 2003: 2.5 metres per second (8.2 ft/s)
- Highest elevation: 1,179 metres (3,868 ft) (since 2003)
- Maximum incline: 60% (min. 39%)

Funiculaire Saint-Imier – Mont-Soleil is a funicular railway in the Jura Mountains, Switzerland. The line leads from the village of Saint-Imier at 828 m to the station Mont-Soleil at 1179 m, on Mont Soleil (1291 m). The line of 743 m in length has a difference of elevation of 351 m at a maximum inclination of 60%.

Built in 1903 as a single-track line with two cars and a passing loop, the track was lengthened and converted to a single car operation in 2003. The line includes several bridges and a tunnel.

The base station is ca. 800 m from St-Imier railway station.

The railway is owned and operated by Funiculaire Saint-Imier - Mont-Soleil SA.
