= Imerius of Immertal =

Saint Imerius of Immertal
- Born: c. 570
- Died: c. 620
- Venerated in: Roman Catholic Church; Eastern Orthodox Church
- Feast: November 13
- Attributes: Depicted as a hermit with a bird of prey.

Imerius (Himerius, Imier, Immer) of Immertal (c. 570 – c. 620 AD) was a monk, hermit, and missionary in the present Swiss Jura. The names of the towns of Saint-Imier and Saint-Ismier refer to him.

Imerius was born in Lugnez, a small village now in the Canton of Jura about 570. He spent some time in Lausanne and made a voyage to Palestine. After he had returned he lived in the valley of Saint-Imier as a hermit. The legend says that Bishop Marius of Lausanne gave him the piece of land at Saint-Imier as a present, but this legend is historical very uncertain. In the 9th century, a monastery was built over his tomb.

== Literature ==
- Pierre-Olivier Walzer, La vie des saints du Jura, Réclère (1979), p. 99–132. (in French)
- Friedrich Wilhelm Bautz. "Himerius, (Hymerius, Imier, Immer), Heiliger". In Biographisch-Bibliographisches Kirchenlexikon. Vol. 2, Bautz, Hamm 1990, ISBN 3-88309-032-8, p. 875. (in German)
