= Alain Auderset =

Swiss cartoonist

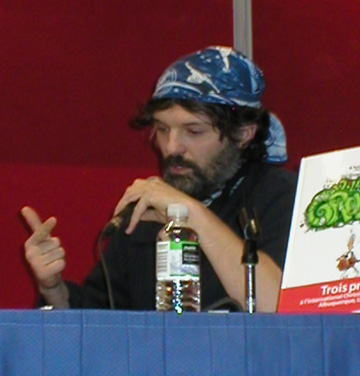
- Alain Auderset being interviewed at Le Festival de la BD francophone in Québec City, QC, Canada, in 2010
- Born: Alain Auderset; 27 October 1968 (age 58) Grenchen, Switzerland
- Areas: Cartoonist, Writer, Penciller, Artist, Inker, Publisher, Letterer, Colourist
- Notable works: Willy Grunch; Marcel; ROBI

Alain Auderset is a Swiss Christian author of bandes dessinées (Franco-Belgian comics) and is best known for his comics albums Willy Grunch, Marcel, and ROBI.

== Biography ==
Born on 27 October 1968 in Grenchen, Switzerland, Auderset was converted to Christianity after reading the French comic magazine Tournesol as a child. Later, passionate for drawing, he studied graphic arts and began to draw comic strips. In 2001 he released his first book, Conventional Wisdom, which has been translated into six additional languages (German, English, Portuguese, Spanish, Chinese and Danish) since it was originally published in French.

His books ROBI (2005) and Willy Grunch (2008) have both won the International Prize for French Language Christian Comics at the Angoulême International Comics Festival. Currently Auderset is self-publishing and claims he has sold approximately 110,000 copies of all his books.

Auderset is also a performance artist as well as a guitarist for the band Saahsal in which his wife Eliane is the lead singer. Since 2010 Auderset has been doing a stand-up comedy routine entitled "The Non-practicing Atheist," touring both in Europe and the Canadian province of Québec. During his last Québec tour in 2013 he was interviewed during a service at a church in Drummondville, QC, which was broadcast live through their website. He was also interviewed on CKZW radio in Montreal.

In 2012 Moondog Animation Studio in Charleston, South Carolina, raised US$117,534.00 through a crowd funding campaign on Kickstarter to produce five pilot episodes of The life and trials of Willy Grunch, based on Auderset's stories and art. The five pilots were completed and released in early 2013, and further episodes are slated to begin production in late 2016 as part of an additional Kickstarter project.

Currently Auderset lives in Saint-Imier with his wife and their four children.

== Bibliography ==
- Alain Auderset, Idées reçues (Conventional Wisdom), Atelier Auderset, 2001
- Alain Auderset, Marcel Book 1, Atelier Auderset, 2004
- Alain Auderset, ROBI, Atelier Auderset, 2005
- Alain Auderset, Idées reçues II (Conventional Wisdom 2), Atelier Auderset, 2006
- Alain Auderset, Willy Grunch, Atelier Auderset, 2008
- Alain Auderset, Les vacances de Marcel (Marcel’s vacations – Marcel Book 2), Atelier Auderset, 2010
- Alain Auderset, Idées reçues III (Conventional Wisdom 3), Atelier Auderset, 2012
- Alain Auderset, Marcel Book 3, Atelier Auderset, 2014

== Prizes ==
- Angoulême 2006: Special jury distinction for Idées reçues
- Angoulême 2007: International Prize for French Language Christian Comics for ROBI pour les intimes
- Albuquerque 2007 : ICCC2 People's Choice Awards – 1st, 3rd and 4th places
- Angoulême 2009: International Prize for French Language Christian Comics for Willy Grunch
