= Observatoire Astronomique de Mont-Soleil =

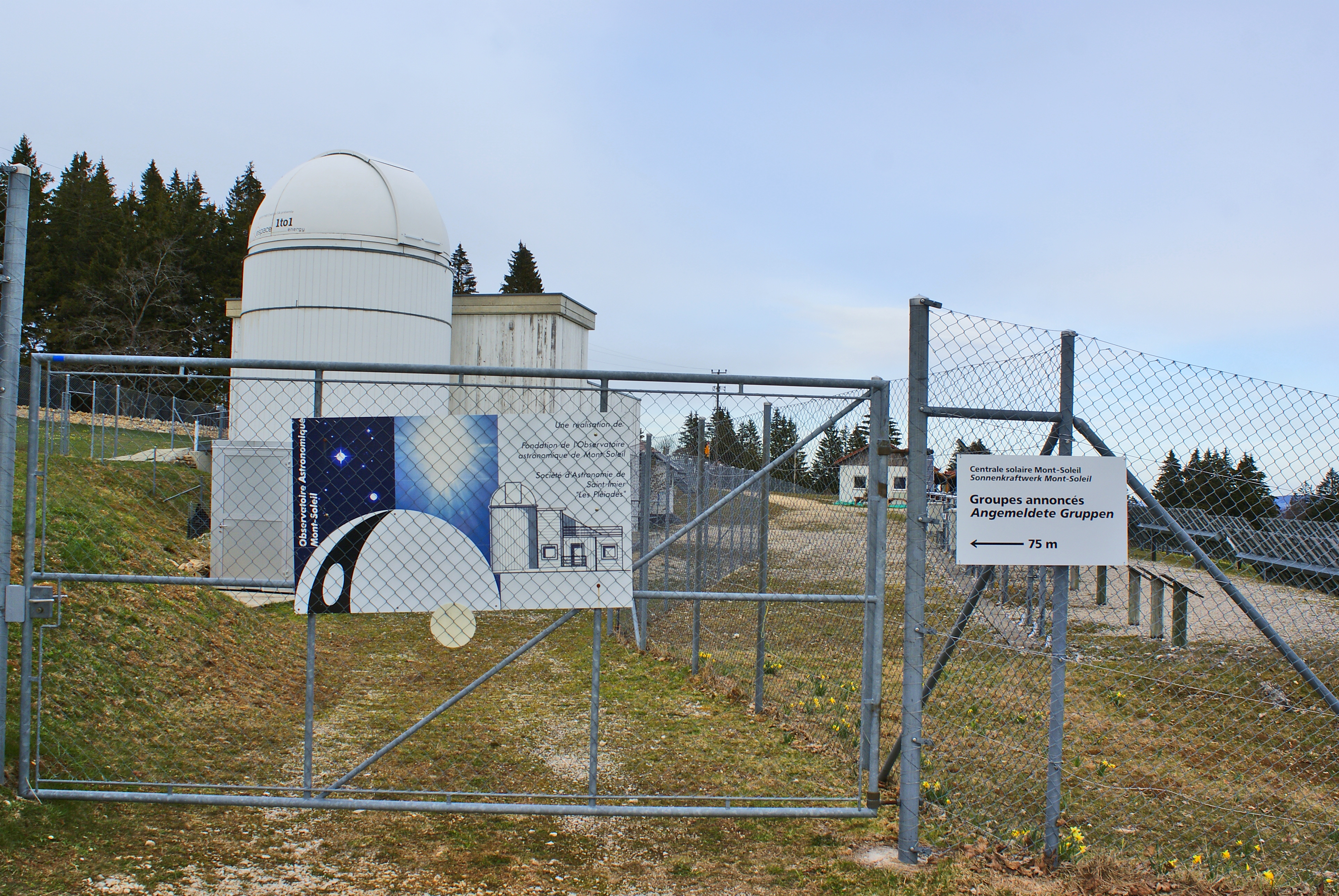
- Organization: Fondation de l'Observatoire Astronomique de Mont-Soleil, Société d'Astronomie de St-Imier - Les Pléiades
- Location: Saint-Imier, Canton of Bern, Switzerland
- Coordinates: 47.1640°N 6.9896°E
- Established: 2002; 24 years ago
- Website: www.pleiades.ch

Observatoire Astronomique de Mont-Soleil is an astronomical observatory located on Mont-Soleil, above Saint-Imier in the canton of Bern, Switzerland. It has a dome of 4.5 m (15 ft).
