= Baptiste Hurni =

Swiss politician and lawyer

Baptiste Hurni (born 4 April 1986 in Neuchâtel) is a Swiss politician (SP) and lawyer.

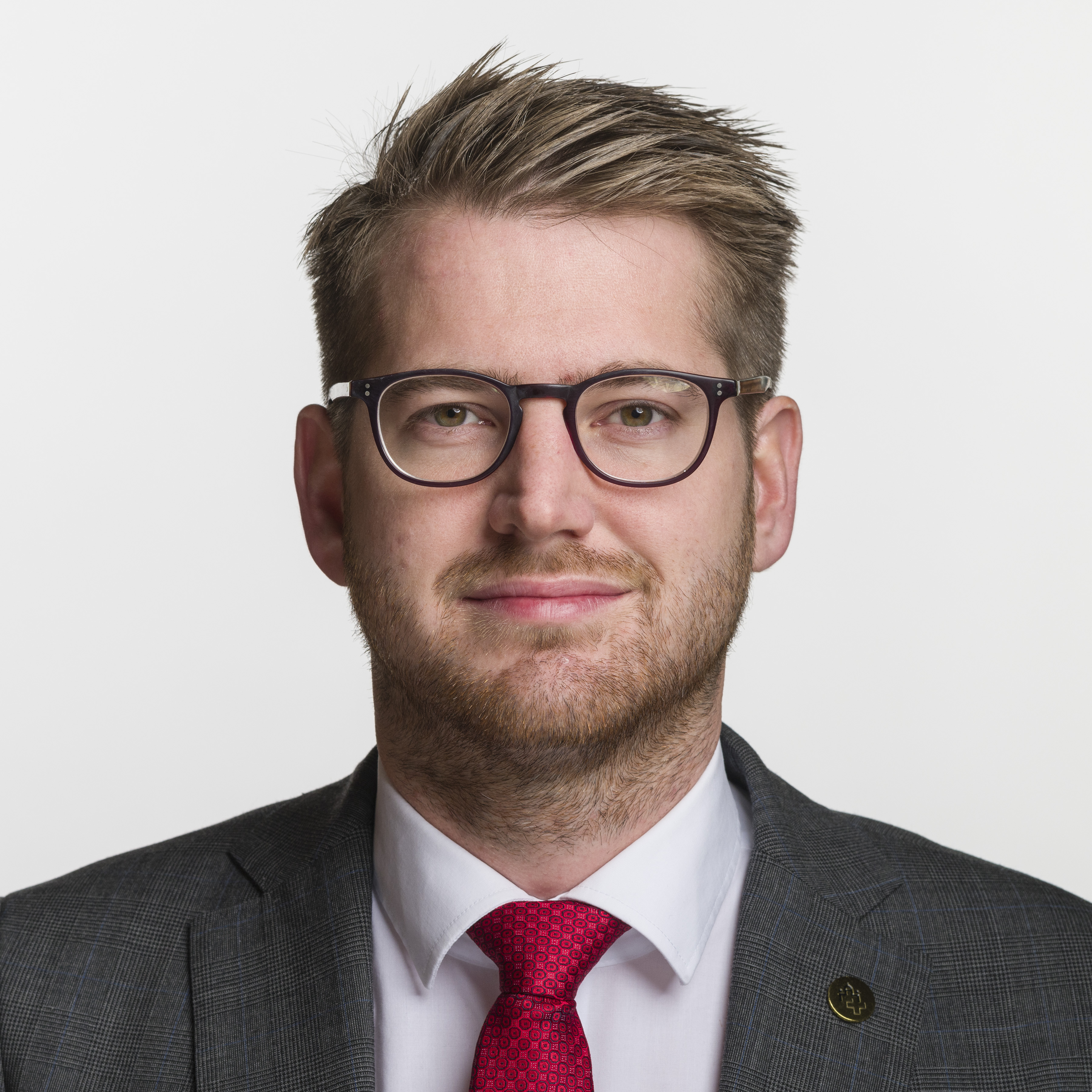
Baptiste Hurni (2019)

== Education ==
Coming from a family of teachers, Hurni first obtained a master's degree in history and French literature and then studied law at the University of Neuchâtel. After completing his bachelor's degree, he decided to do a double master's degree at two universities, the University of Neuchâtel and King's College London. He was certified as a lawyer in 2016 and has been working at Javet Schwarb Mauri Lawyers since 2019. He represents the tenants' side at the regional arbitration board for rental issues.

== Politics ==
After an involvement in the youth parliament, Baptiste Hurni was elected to the municipal council (executive) of Noiraigue at the age of 18 in 2004, where he worked until 2008. Together with others he achieved the merger of several municipalities there Municipality Val-de-Travers. From 2007 to 2019, Hurni was a member of the cantonal parliament and, since 2016, of the city parliament of Neuchâtel. From 2010 to 2013, he chaired the canton's Social Democratic Party.

In the Swiss parliamentary elections 2019, Hurni was elected to the National Council at the age of 33. He is a member of the Commission for Legal Affairs and the Legislative Planning Commission 2019–2023 (as of April 2022). Previously, he was able to gain experience in Federal Bern as a personal employee of his party colleague and Neuchâtel National Councilor Jacques-André Maire.

Baptiste Hurni presides over various associations, including (as of April 2022) the Red Cross of the Canton of Neuchâtel and the Fondation Romande pour la chanson et les musiques actuelles, and he works as Vice President of the Umbrella Association of Swiss Patient Centers.

In the Parliamentary elections 2023, Hurni was elected to the Council of States, so the FDP lost its Neuchâtel seat.
