= Saint-Imier =

- Municipality
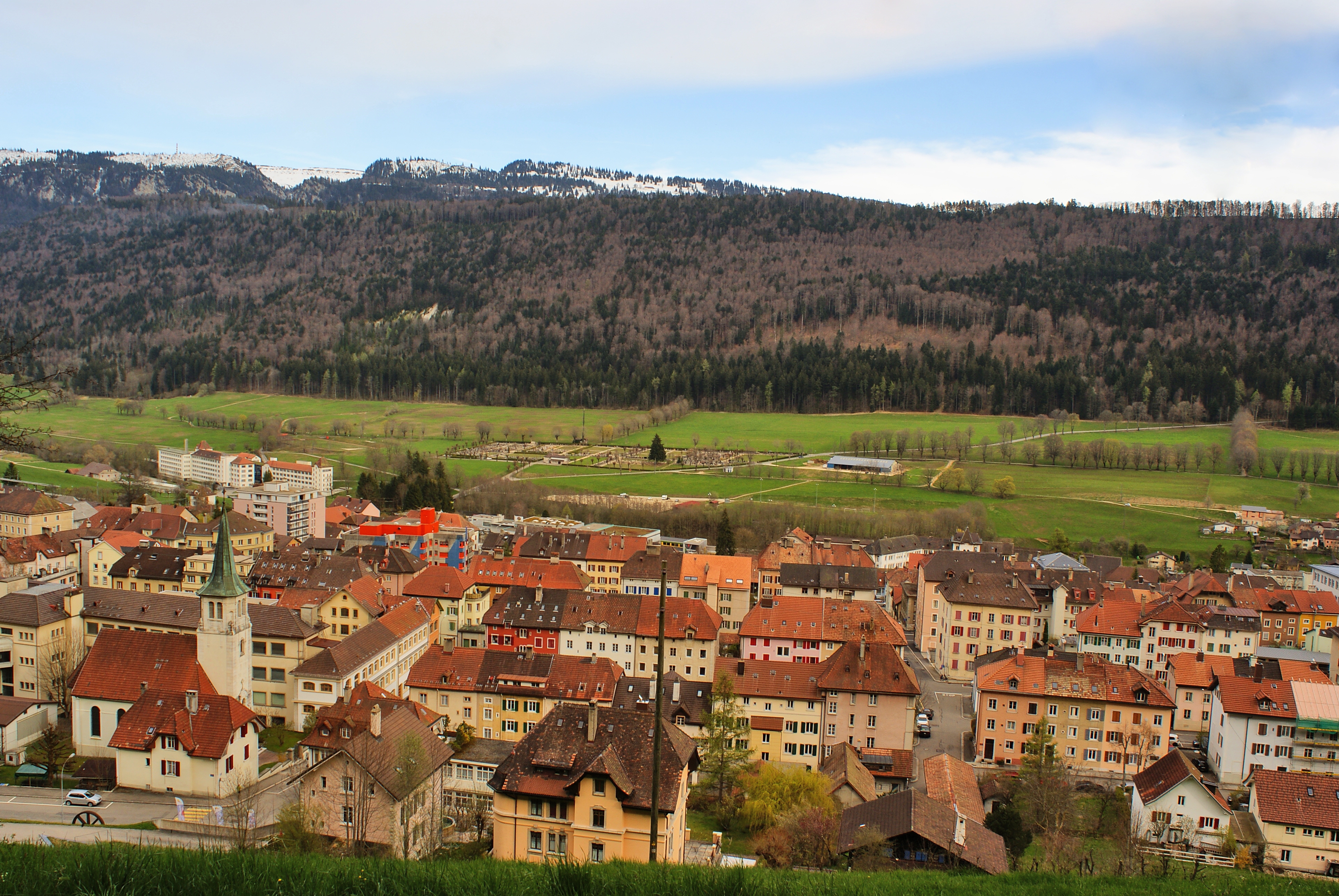

- Flag Coat of arms
- Location of Saint-Imier
- Location within Switzerland Location within Canton of Bern
- Coordinates: 47°9′N 7°0′E
- Country: Switzerland
- Canton: Bern
- District: Jura bernois

Government
  - Executive: Conseil municipal with 7 members
  - Mayor: Corentin Jeanneret FDP/PLR
  - Parliament: Conseil de Ville with 31 members

Area
  - Total: 20.96 km^{2} (8.09 sq mi)
- Elevation: 820 m (2,690 ft)

Population (December 2020)
  - Total: 5,156
  - Density: 246.0/km^{2} (637.1/sq mi)
- Time zone: UTC+01:00 (CET)
  - Summer (DST): UTC+02:00 (CEST)
- Postal code: 2610
- SFOS number: 443
- ISO 3166 code: CH-BE
- Surrounded by: Sonvilier, Villeret, Muriaux, Le Noirmont, Les Bois, Val-de-Ruz (NE)
- Website: www.saint-imier.ch

Saint-Imier (French pronunciation: [sɛ̃t‿imje]; Frainc-Comtou: Sainte-Mie) is a municipality in the Jura bernois administrative district in the canton of Bern in Switzerland. It is located in the French-speaking Bernese Jura (Jura Bernois).

It is notable for having hosted the Saint-Imier Congress, widely regarded as the birth of the anarchist movement. The town has held a special significance for anarchists ever since, serving as the site for numerous commemorations and international gatherings, such as Anarchy 2023. The Observatoire Astronomique de Mont-Soleil is located above the village.

== History ==
Saint-Imier is first mentioned in 884 as cella de sancti Himerii. The municipality was formerly known by its German name St. Immer, however, that name is no longer used. Its name refers to Imerius of Immertal, a 7th-century saint.

According to the legend of St. Imerius, he settled in the valley as a hermit in the late 6th or early 7th century on a piece of land that bishop Marius of Lausanne gave him as a present. In 884 a cella (probably a church, farm and monastery) was mentioned on the site. Archeological excavations around the former Church of St. Martin indicate that a village grew up around the cella around the same time. Two of the 142 graves from the church have been dated to the Early Middle Ages and the church was rebuilt at least three times before the 14th or early 15th century.

In 884 the cella with its outbuildings belonged to Moutier-Grandval Abbey. In 999, the Abbey donated Saint-Imier and a number of surrounding villages to the Prince-Bishop of Basel. In 1264, the Bishop appointed Otto of Arguel (or Erguel) as the vogt over the Saint-Imier valley fief. Otto raised the valley to become a seigniory and parish of the Diocese of Basel. By the end of the 15th century, Saint-Imier included the villages of Villeret, Sonvilier, Renan and La Ferriere.

Even though the physical valley was owned by the Bishop of Basel, religiously it was part of the Diocese of Lausanne. The Saint-Imier parish was probably founded in the 9th or 10th century. A village chapel was first mentioned in 968, with the parish church of St. Martin first appearing in the records in 1228. The church of St. Martin was later rebuilt in the gothic style. Another church, the collegiate church was built in the 11th century, probably under the direction of the Bishop of Basel. In 1530, Biel encouraged Saint-Imier to embrace the Protestant Reformation and convert to the new religion. The collegiate church before the parish church for the new Reformed parish. Over the following centuries, the Church of St. Martin was used less and less until it was demolished in 1828. In 1814 the town and the surrounding valley transferred from Lausanne to the Diocese of Basel. Catholic church services resumed in Saint-Imier in 1857 and in 1866 the neo-gothic Church of St. Martin was built. In 1912 a Christian Catholic church was built in the town.

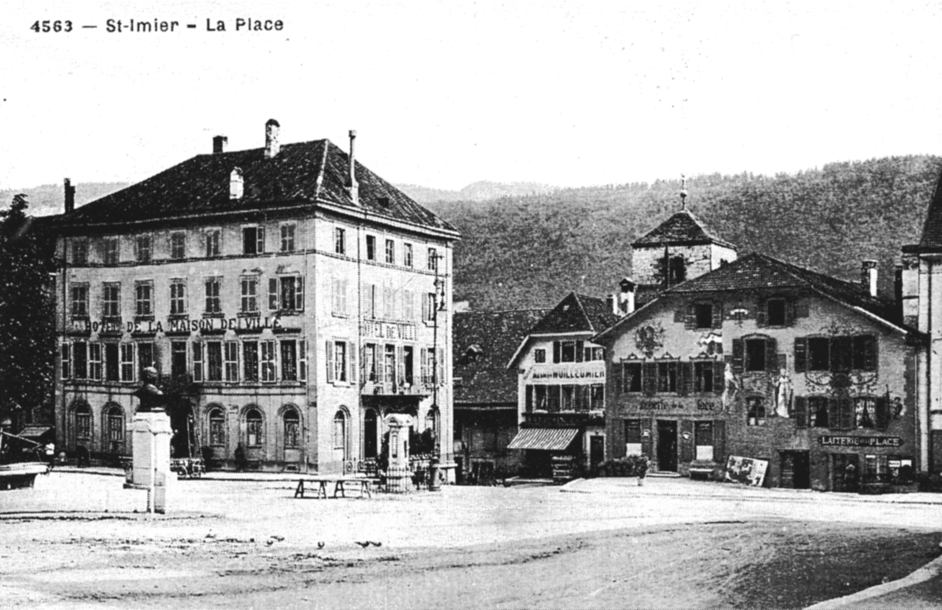
The Hôtel de la maison de Ville in Saint Imier. The Anti-authoritarian International was founded there on a congress taking place on September 15/16, 1872.

In 1792 Théodore Frédéric Louis Liomin, the vogt or bailiff of Saint-Imier, threw his support behind the revolutionary movement that was sweeping the region. After the 1797 French victory and the Treaty of Campo Formio, Saint-Imier became part of the French Département of Mont-Terrible. Three years later, in 1800 it became part of the Département of Haut-Rhin. After Napoleon's defeat and the Congress of Vienna, Saint-Imier was assigned to the Canton of Bern in 1815.

During the 19th century the anti-authoritarian or anarchist movement gained a foothold in the region. In 1872, the Jura Federation, which had strong support in Saint-Imier, organized a congress in Saint-Imier at which the Anti-authoritarian International was founded.

During the 18th century the inhabitants of the valley gradually gave up agriculture in favor of more lucrative jobs in the watch and lace-making industries. The first watch parts workshop opened in the 1720s and the industry continued to expand throughout the 19th century. By 1817 there were about 200 workers employed in either watchmaking workshops or small shops at home. The small scale workshops were replaced by large factory work, when Longines opened a factory in the town in 1867. By the end of the year, 1,600 people were employed in 47 watchmaking companies. Because the town's economy was so dependent on watchmaking, the economic crisis of the 1930s and the 1970s hit Saint-Imier hard. By the beginning of the 21st century, there were about ten watchmaking companies and the economy had diversified to include dental and medical technology and meteorology.

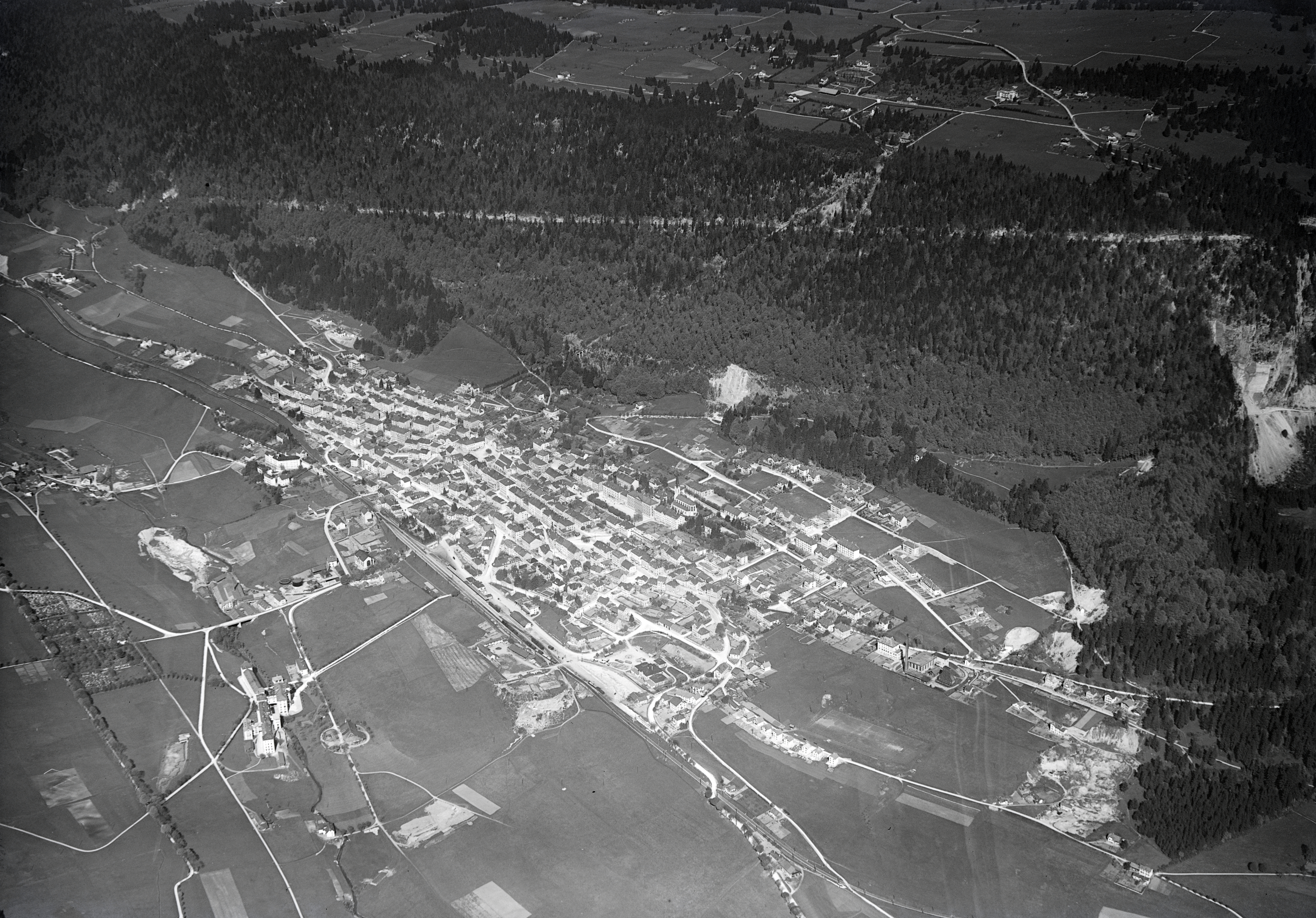
View of Saint Imier and of Mont Soleil

Portions of the town were destroyed by fire in 1839, 1843 and 1856. A hospital opened in Saint-Imier in 1856. In 1874 the town was connected to the Swiss rail network. The town's infrastructure was modernized early, before 1900 it had municipal water, gas and electricity. Saint-Imier has grown into a regional education center. The town's secondary school opened in 1860, followed by a watchmaker's school in 1866. The watch-maker's school was expanded into a machinist's school in 1896 and a technical vocational school in 1961. In 1976 it became a school of engineering and in 2005 it was integrated into the Haute école Arc/Hochschule Arc. A number of other schools opened in the town including the Bernese Jura Music School (1981), a vocational and technical school (1997), and a training center for health professionals (1993).

On 31 December 2009, the district of Courtelary, the municipality's former district, was dissolved. On the following day, 1 January 2010, a new district (or arrondissement administratif) of Jura bernois was created, which includes all of the former Courtelary District, as well as the former district of La Neuveville and the area around Tavannes.

=== Anarchy 2023 ===
On 19 July 2023, thousands of anarchists began arriving in Saint-Imier to participate in an international anarchist gathering, in celebration of the 150th anniversary of the Saint-Imier Congress. The event included lectures, workshops, concerts, film screenings, theatre plays, exhibitions and a book fair. By the second day of the event, thousands of people had arrived in the town, causing logistical issues for the self-managed space. The event also caused some safety problems, as its campsite was located next to train tracks that campers often crossed over in order to get to the event location, despite attempts by the event organisers to stop them. In order to guarantee safety, the Swiss Federal Railways halted all rail traffic between Saint-Imier and La Chaux-de-Fonds over the weekend, organising replacement bus services in order to maintain the public transit network. The event would end up counting 5,000 attendees, mostly people in their early twenties, who were reportedly warmly welcomed by the town's population. Saint-Imier mayor Corentin Jeanneret reported that the event went largely smoothly, with the exception of a few cases of graffiti.

== Geography ==
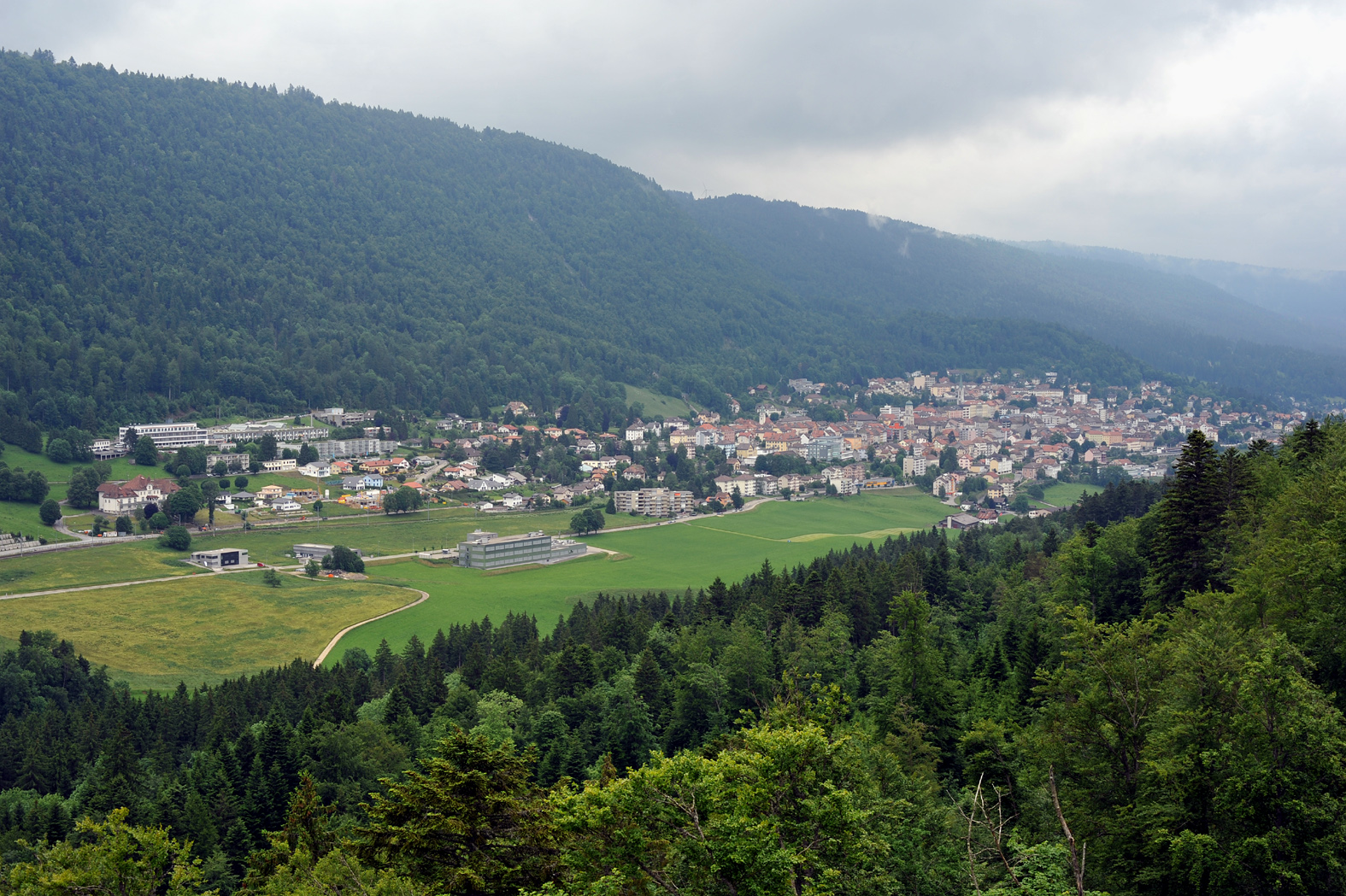
View of Saint-Imier from the ruins of the Erguel Castle

Saint-Imier has an area of 20.87 km^{2} (8.06 sq mi). Of this area, 49% is used for agricultural purposes, while or 40% is forested. Of the rest, 9.3% of the total is buildings or roads, and 0.7%of the total is unproductive.

Of the built up area, housing and buildings made up 5.8% and transportation infrastructure made up 2.2%. Out of the forested land, 34% of the total land area is heavily forested and 6% is covered with orchards or small clusters of trees. Of the agricultural land, 1.7% is used for growing crops and 20% is pastures and 27% is used for alpine pastures.

The municipality is located in the Saint-Imier valley along the Suze river and on the Biel/Bienne-La Chaux-de-Fonds road.

== Coat of arms ==
The blazon of the municipal coat of arms is Sable two Pales Or and overall on a Bar Argent a Mullet of Five Gules.

== Demographics ==
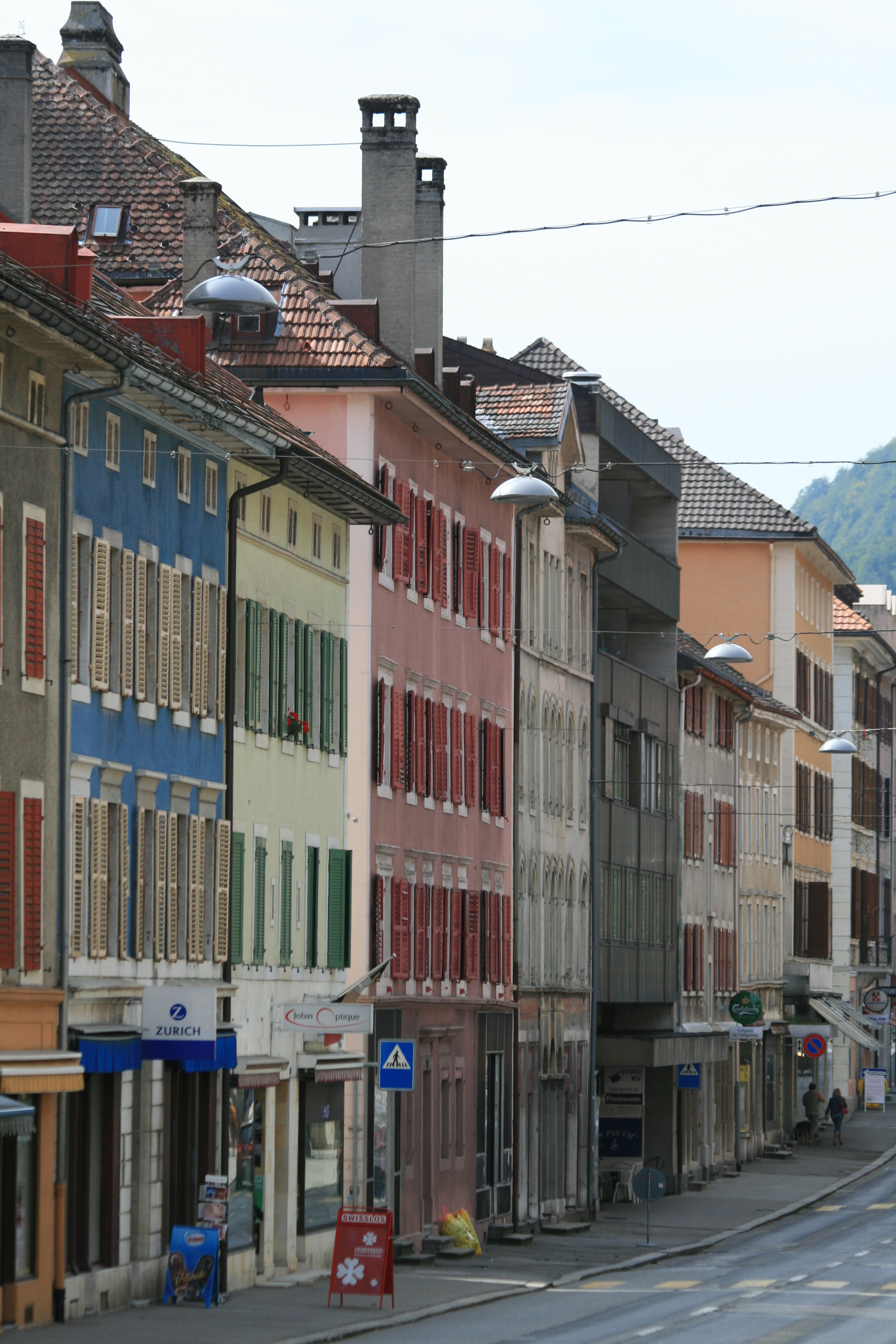
The historic old town of Saint-Imier

Saint-Imier has a population (as of December 2020) of 5,156. As of 2010, 23.9% of the population are resident foreign nationals. Over the last 10 years (2000-2010) the population has changed at a rate of 4.2%. Migration accounted for 6.3%, while births and deaths accounted for -2.9%.

Most of the population (as of 2000) speaks French (4,049 or 84.2%) as their first language, German is the second most common (315 or 6.6%) and Italian is the third (183 or 3.8%). There are 2 people who speak Romansh.

As of 2008, the population was 48.1% male and 51.9% female. The population was made up of 1,682 Swiss men (35.3% of the population) and 612 (12.8%) non-Swiss men. There were 1,947 Swiss women (40.8%) and 530 (11.1%) non-Swiss women. Of the population in the municipality, 1,486 or about 30.9% were born in Saint-Imier and lived there in 2000. There were 1,072 or 22.3% who were born in the same canton, while 1,040 or 21.6% were born somewhere else in Switzerland, and 1,028 or 21.4% were born outside of Switzerland.

As of 2010, children and teenagers (0–19 years old) make up 22.1% of the population, while adults (20–64 years old) make up 56.7% and seniors (over 64 years old) make up 21.2%.

As of 2000, there were 1,842 people who were single and never married in the municipality. There were 2,242 married individuals, 447 widows or widowers and 276 individuals who are divorced.

As of 2000, there were 916 households that consist of only one person and 86 households with five or more people. In 2000, a total of 2,190 apartments (78.9% of the total) were permanently occupied, while 362 apartments (13.0%) were seasonally occupied and 223 apartments (8.0%) were empty. As of 2010, the construction rate of new housing units was 1.3 new units per 1000 residents. The vacancy rate for the municipality, in 2011, was 4.5%.

The historical population is given in the following chart:

== Heritage sites of national significance ==
The Collégiale and the Longines Watch factory are listed as Swiss heritage site of national significance. The entire urban village of Saint-Imier is part of the Inventory of Swiss Heritage Sites.

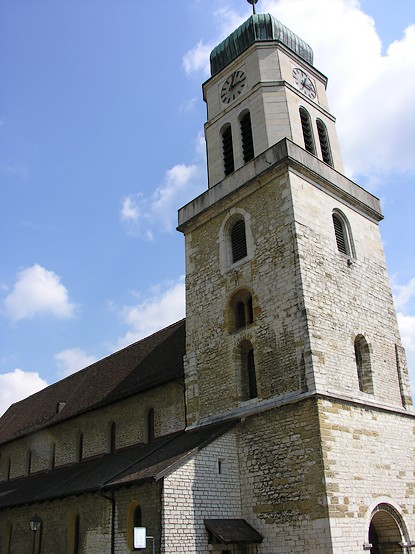
Collégiale of Saint-Imier

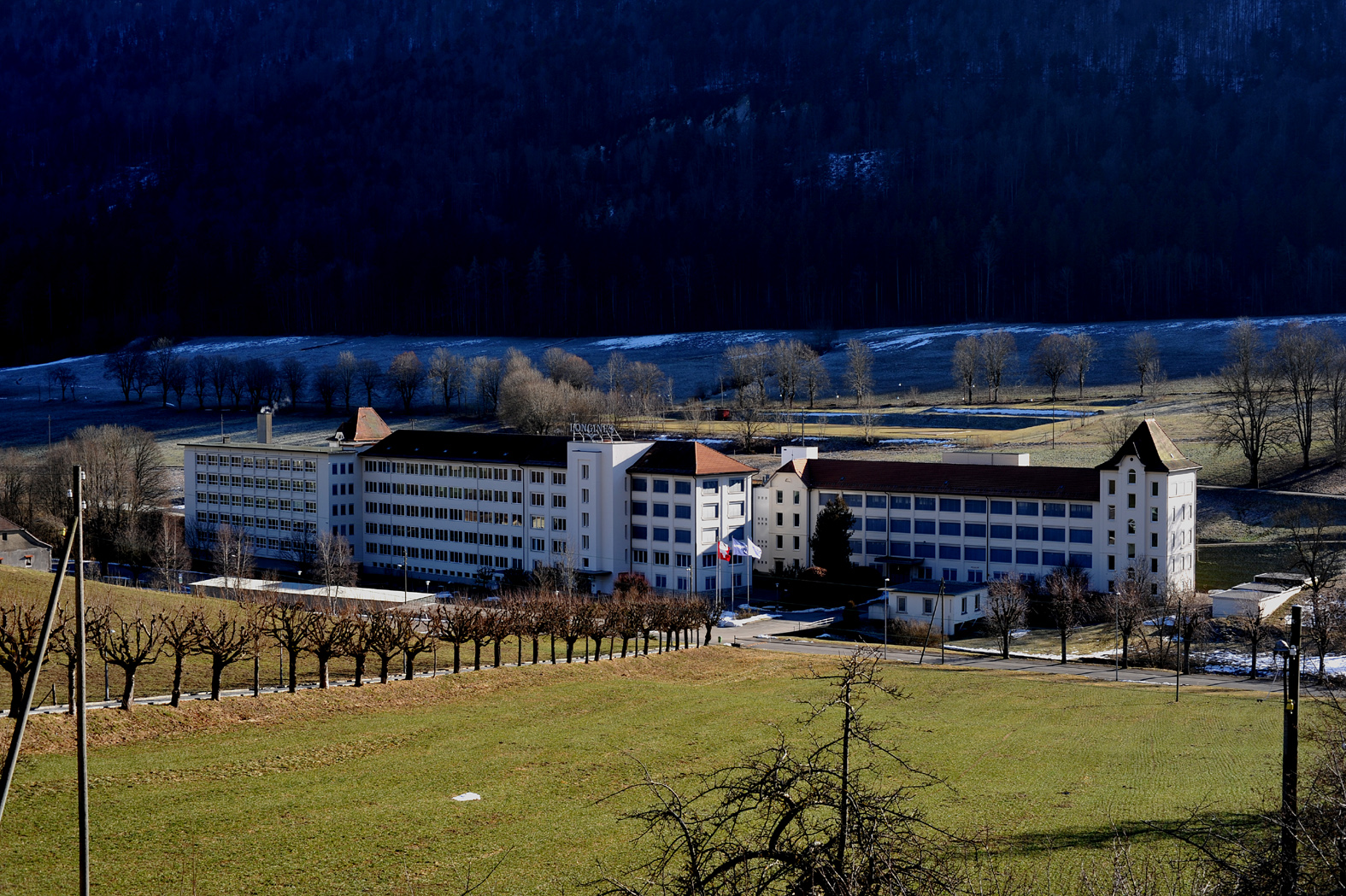
Longines Watch factory

== Politics ==
In the 2011 federal election the most popular party was the Social Democratic Party (SP) which received 26.4% of the vote. The next two most popular parties were the Swiss People's Party (SVP) (25.4%), and the FDP.The Liberals (18.2%). In the federal election, a total of 929 votes were cast, and the voter turnout was 31.6%.

== Economy ==
Saint-Imier is the hometown of the Longines watchmaking company. The Breitling watchmaking company was founded in Saint-Imier, but moved to Grenchen, Canton of Solothurn.

As of 2011, Saint-Imier had an unemployment rate of 3.59%. As of 2008, there were a total of 2,483 people employed in the municipality. Of these, there were 61 people employed in the primary economic sector and about 23 businesses involved in this sector. 1,102 people were employed in the secondary sector and there were 57 businesses in this sector. 1,320 people were employed in the tertiary sector, with 164 businesses in this sector. There were 183 residents of the municipality who were employed in some capacity, of which females made up 59.0% of the workforce.

In 2008 there were a total of 2,069 full-time equivalent jobs. The number of jobs in the primary sector was 46, of which 42 were in agriculture and 4 were in forestry or lumber production. The number of jobs in the secondary sector was 1,024 of which 879 or (85.8%) were in manufacturing and 81 (7.9%) were in construction. The number of jobs in the tertiary sector was 999. In the tertiary sector; 184 or 18.4% were in wholesale or retail sales or the repair of motor vehicles, 29 or 2.9% were in the movement and storage of goods, 48 or 4.8% were in a hotel or restaurant, 40 or 4.0% were the insurance or financial industry, 44 or 4.4% were technical professionals or scientists, 101 or 10.1% were in education and 437 or 43.7% were in health care.

In 2000, there were 1,624 workers who commuted into the municipality and 802 workers who commuted away. The municipality is a net importer of workers, with about 2.0 workers entering the municipality for every one leaving. About 11.3% of the workforce coming into Saint-Imier are coming from outside Switzerland. Of the working population, 10.2% used public transportation to get to work, and 53.3% used a private car.

== Religion ==
From the 2000 census, 1,989 or 41.4% belonged to the Swiss Reformed Church, while 1,642 or 34.2% were Roman Catholic. Of the rest of the population, there were 22 members of an Orthodox church (or about 0.46% of the population), there were 17 individuals (or about 0.35% of the population) who belonged to the Christian Catholic Church, and there were 386 individuals (or about 8.03% of the population) who belonged to another Christian church. There were 161 (or about 3.35% of the population) who were Islamic. There were 4 individuals who were Buddhist, 1 person who was Hindu and 4 individuals who belonged to another church. 617 (or about 12.84% of the population) belonged to no church, are agnostic or atheist, and 156 individuals (or about 3.25% of the population) did not answer the question.

== Education ==
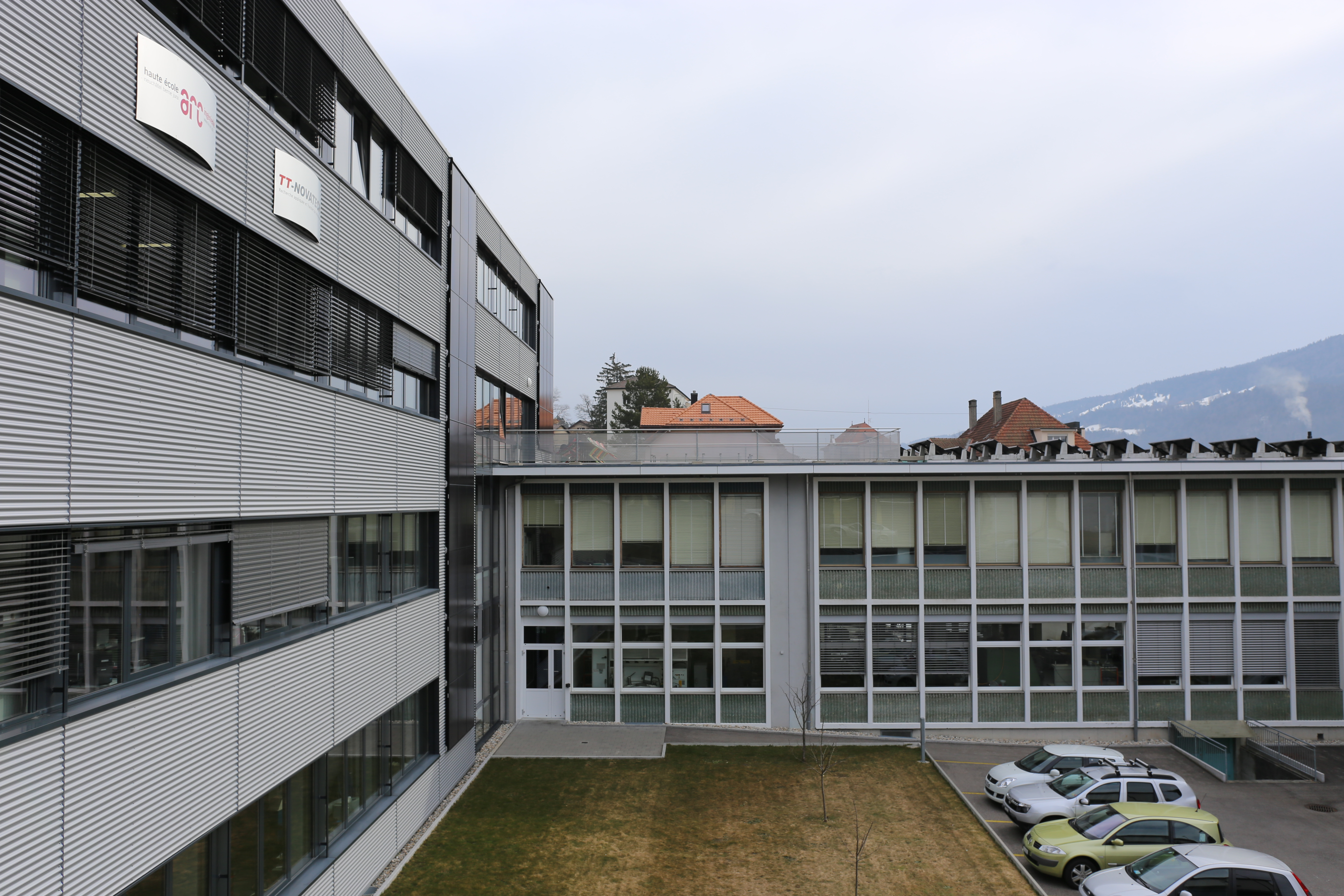
Haute Ecole Arc, Saint-Imier

In Saint-Imier about 1,696 or (35.3%) of the population have completed non-mandatory upper secondary education, and 438 or (9.1%) have completed additional higher education (either university or a Fachhochschule). Of the 438 who completed tertiary schooling, 60.5% were Swiss men, 20.5% were Swiss women, 11.0% were non-Swiss men and 8.0% were non-Swiss women.

The Canton of Bern school system provides one year of non-obligatory Kindergarten, followed by six years of Primary school. This is followed by three years of obligatory lower Secondary school where the students are separated according to ability and aptitude. Following the lower Secondary students may attend additional schooling or they may enter an apprenticeship.

During the 2010-11 school year, there were a total of 695 students attending classes in Saint-Imier. There were 5 kindergarten classes with a total of 100 students in the municipality. Of the kindergarten students, 27.0% were permanent or temporary residents of Switzerland (not citizens) and 33.0% have a different mother language than the classroom language. The municipality had 21 primary classes and 349 students. Of the primary students, 31.8% were permanent or temporary residents of Switzerland (not citizens) and 19.2% have a different mother language than the classroom language. During the same year, there were 13 lower secondary classes with a total of 246 students. There were 19.1% who were permanent or temporary residents of Switzerland (not citizens) and 15.9% have a different mother language than the classroom language. As of 2000, there were 396 students in Saint-Imier who came from another municipality, while 126 residents attended schools outside the municipality.

Saint-Imier is home to 2 libraries, the Haute école Arc – Ingénierie and the Bibliothèque régionale de St-Imier. There was a combined total (as of 2008) of 29,145 books or other media in the libraries, and in the same year a total of 41,777 items were loaned out.

== Transportation ==
The municipality has a railway station, St-Imier. The station is located on the Biel/Bienne–La Chaux-de-Fonds line and has half-hourly service to Biel/Bienne and La Chaux-de-Fonds.

Mont Soleil can be reached with Funiculaire Saint-Imier-Mont-Soleil.

== Sports ==
HC Sainti Bats plays in the Première Ligue, the fourth tier of Swiss hockey. Their home arena is the 3,000-seat Erguël Arena.

== Notable residents ==
- Alain Auderset, Christian author;
- George-Emile Eberhard, watchmaker and industrialist;
- Charles Guyot, professional road racing cyclist;
- Jonathan Hirschi, racing driver;
- Raymond Künzli, professional road racing cyclist;
- Conny Perrin, professional tennis player.
