= Mont Soleil =

Mountain in Switzerland

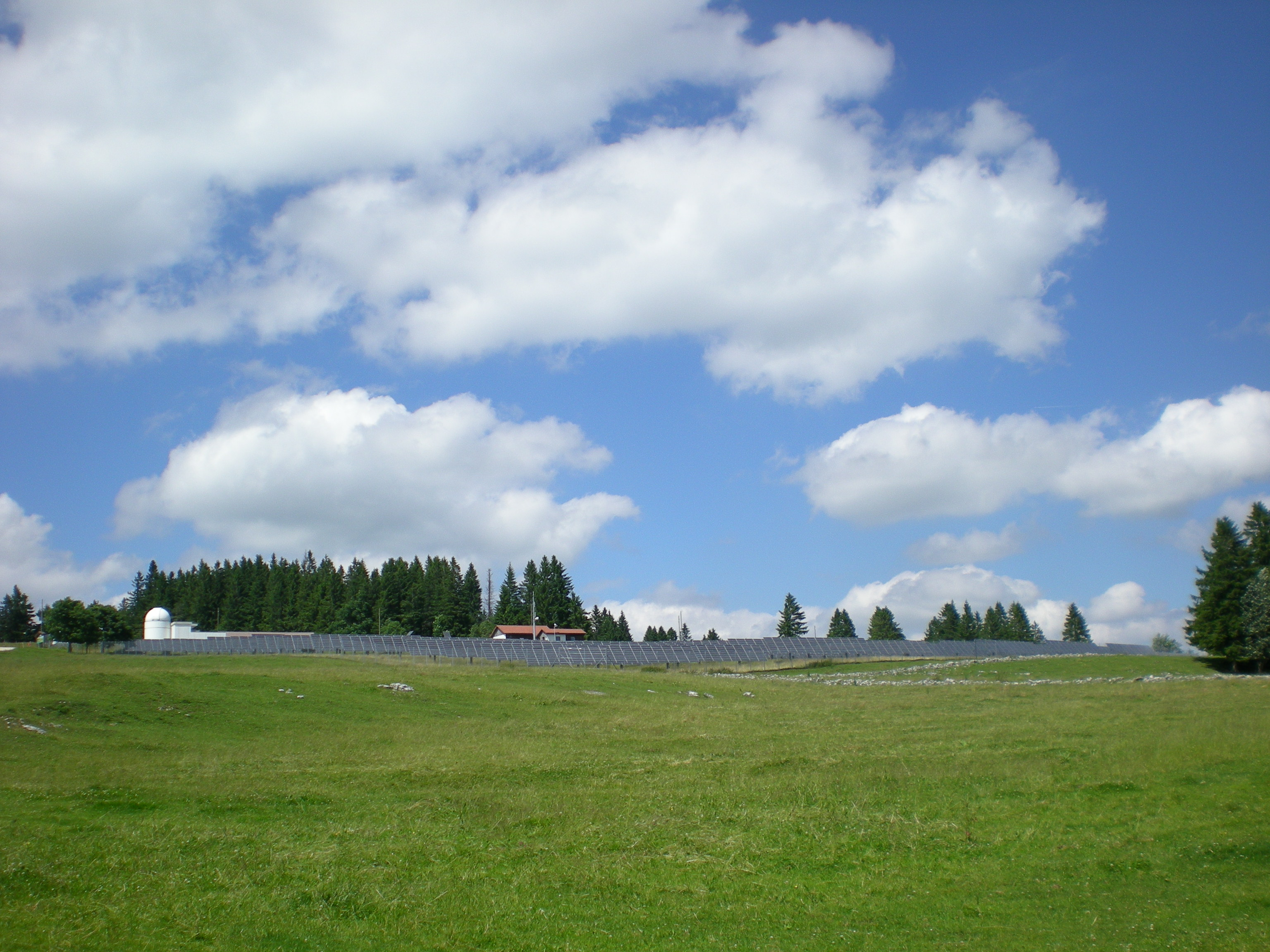
- View near the summit

Highest point
- Elevation: 1,291 m (4,236 ft)
- Prominence: 221 m (725 ft)
- Parent peak: Mont Racine
- Coordinates: 47°09′55″N 6°59′20″E

Geography
- Location within Switzerland
- Location: Bern, Switzerland
- Parent range: Jura Mountains

Mont Soleil is a mountain of the Jura Mountains, located north of Saint-Imier in the canton of Bern, Switzerland. The summit reaches to 1,291 metres (4,236 ft) and the area can be easily accessed with Funiculaire Saint-Imier-Mont-Soleil, a funicular from Saint-Imier, reaching a height of 1,180 m (3,870 ft).

An observatory is located on the summit as well as several wind turbines and a solar park: the former with their presence, the highest is 150 m (490 ft) high, and noise introduced an element of disturbance in the landscape.

== Gallery ==
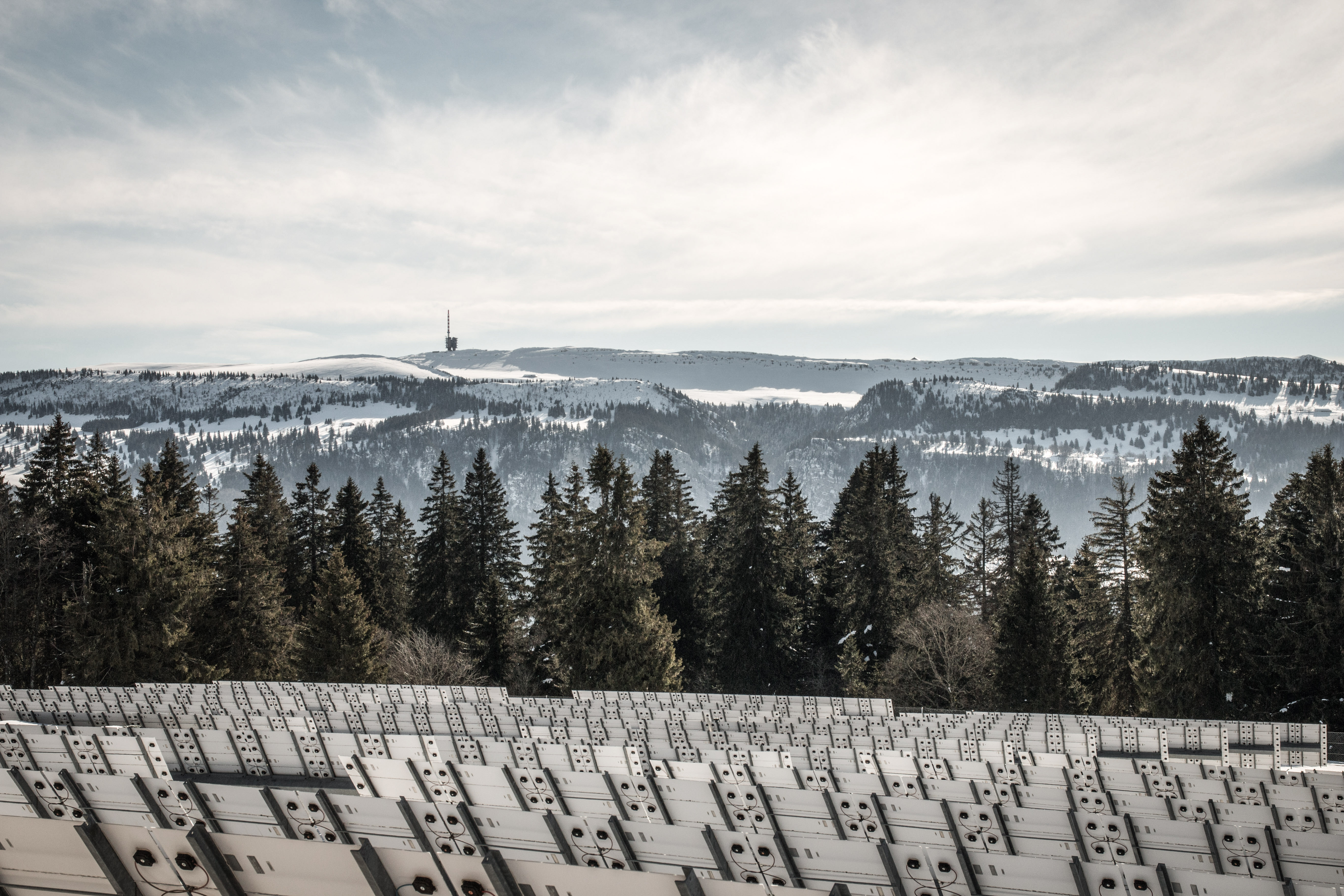
View of Chasseral from the solar park

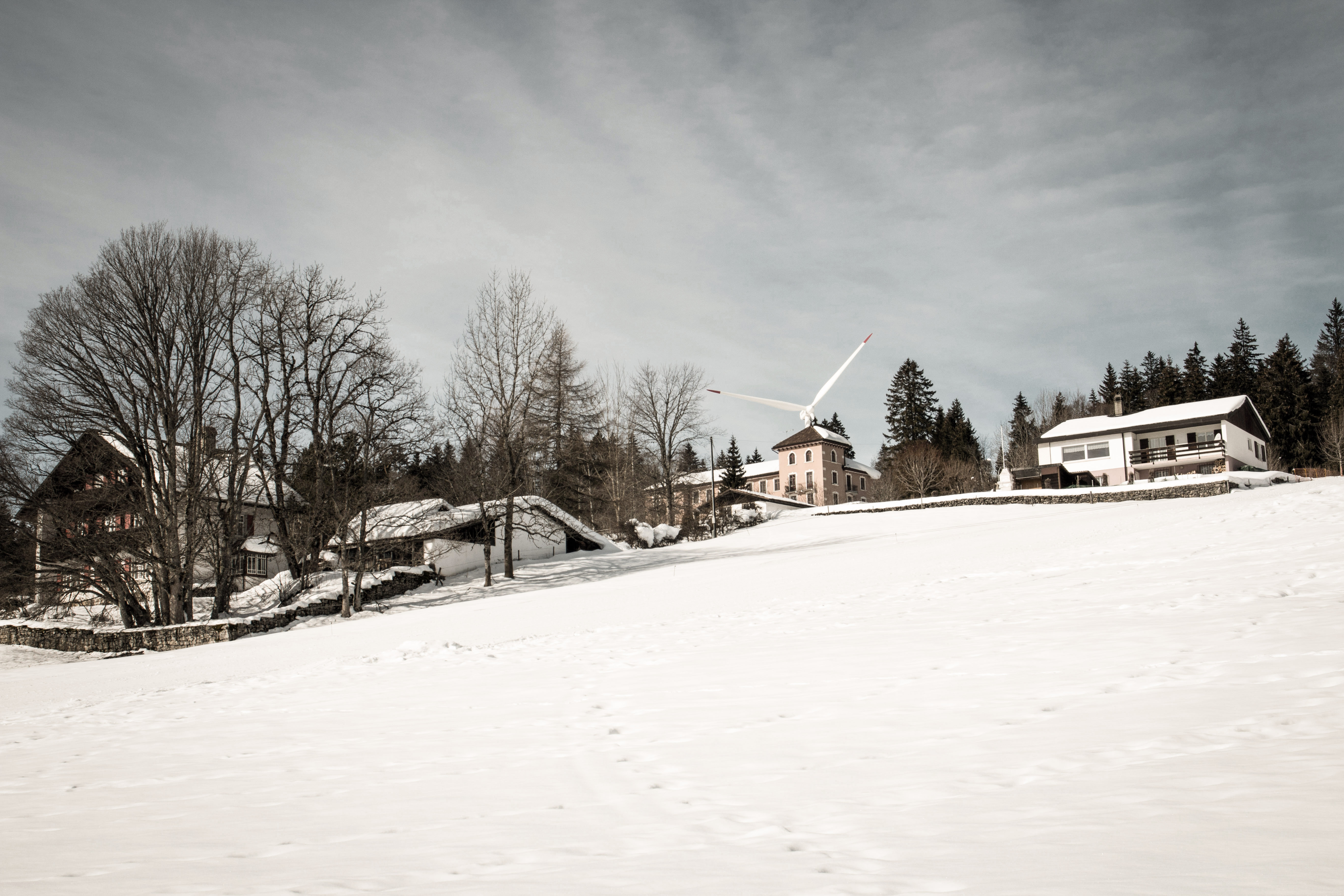
View of the summit with a wind turbine

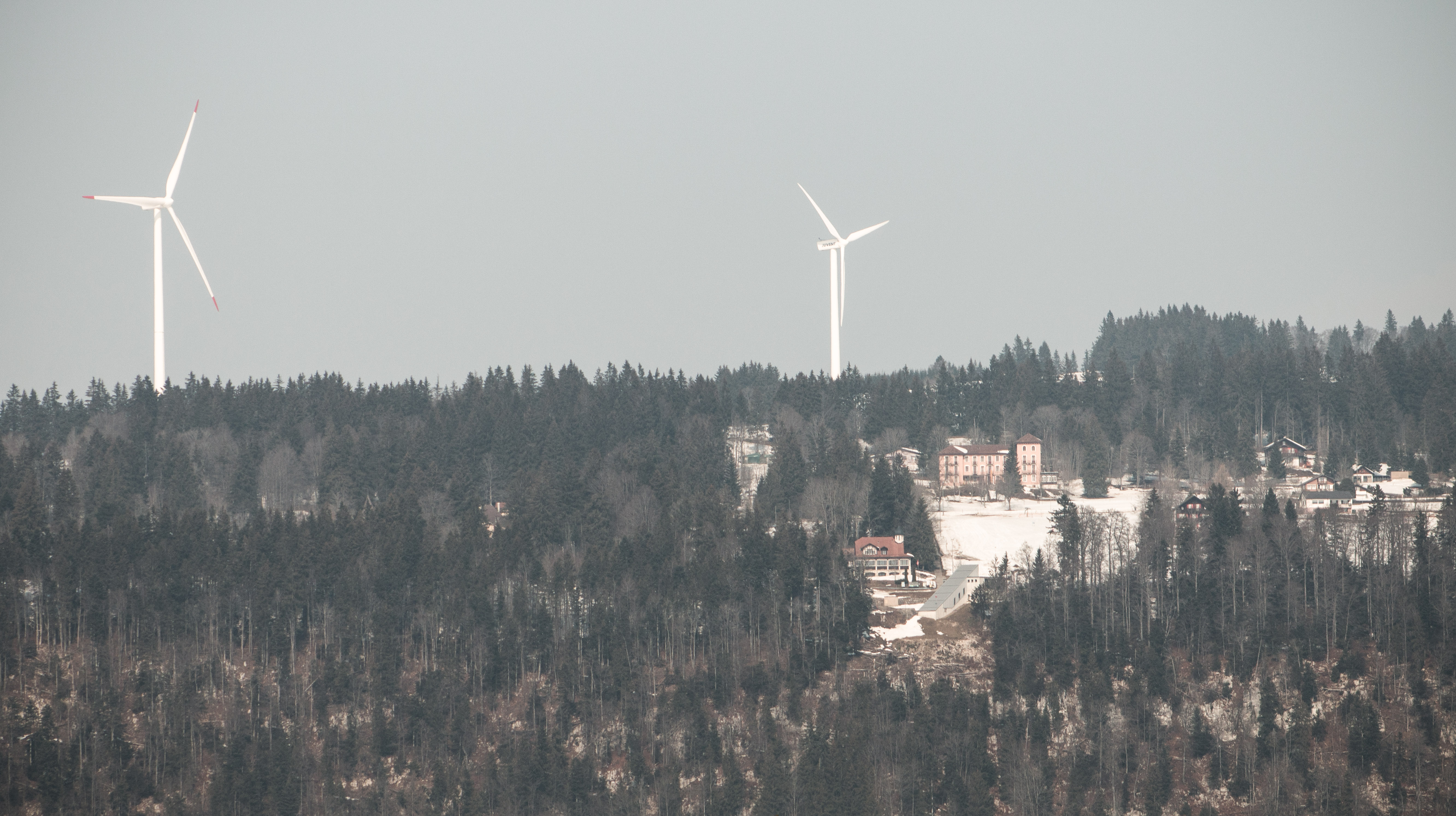
View of the summit with the wind turbines

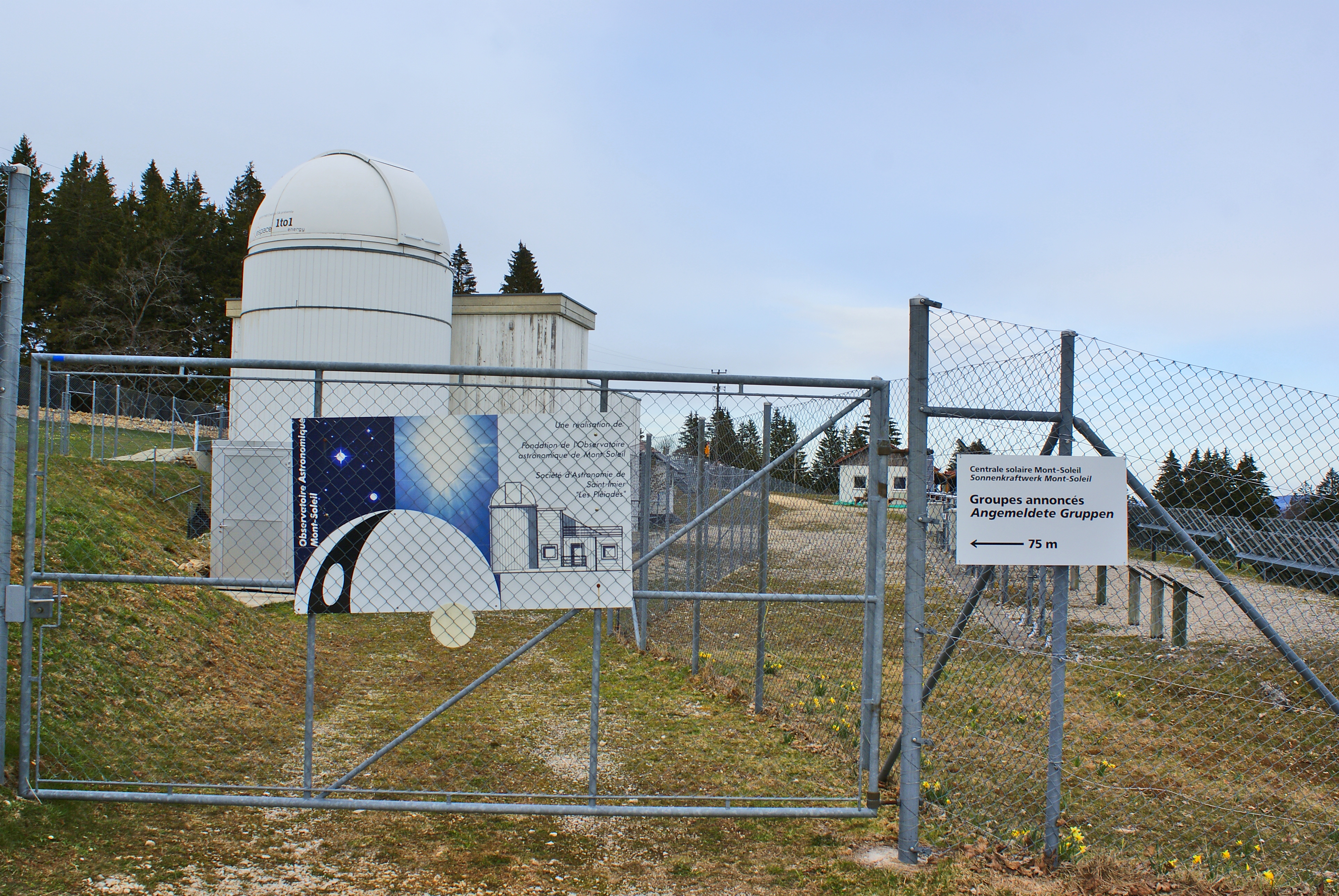
Astronomical Observatory

Pension des Eloyes

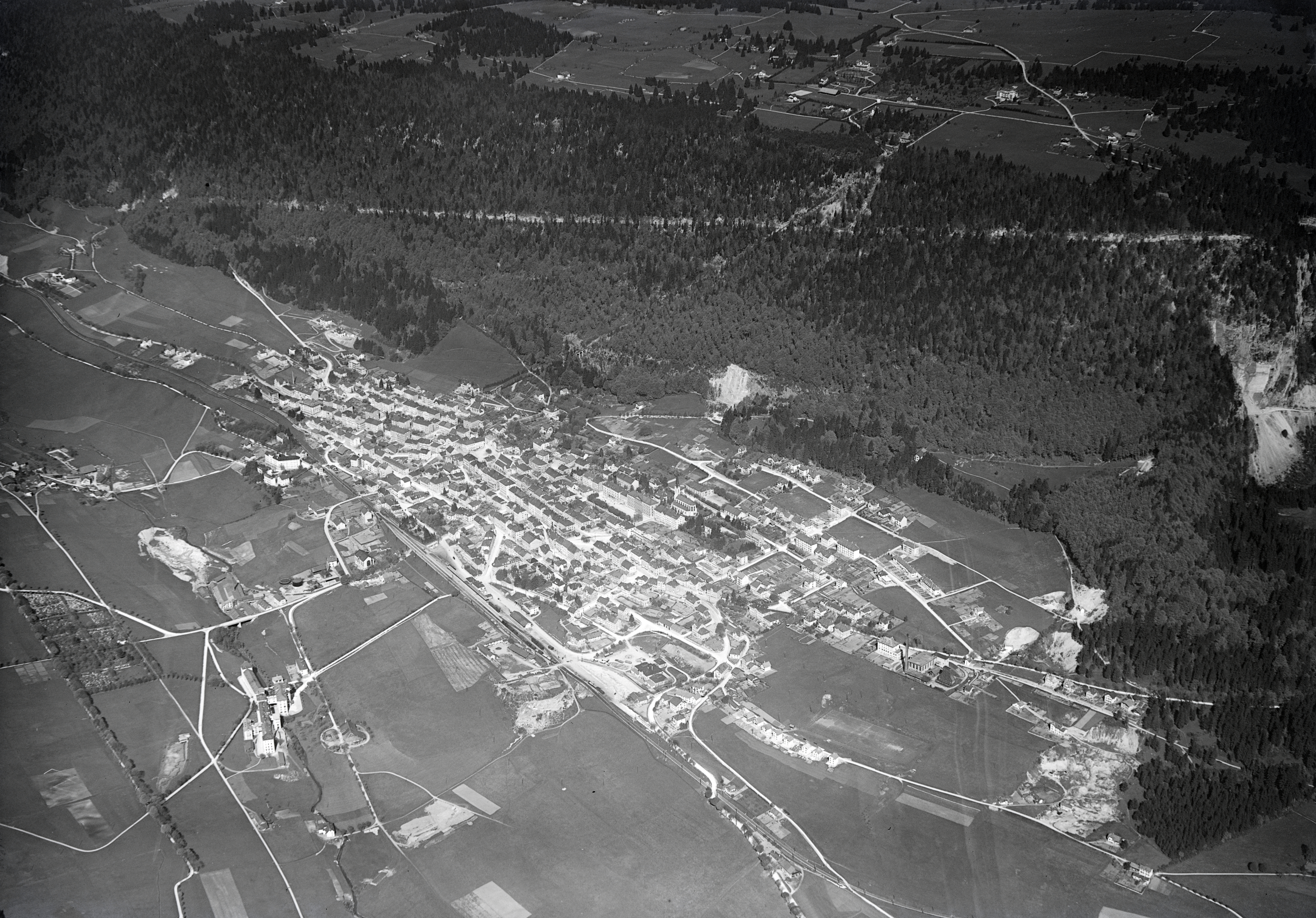
View of Saint Imier and Mont Soleil

House Peter Widmer

== See also ==
- List of mountains of Switzerland accessible by public transport
