= Rémy Scheurer =

Swiss politician (1934–2026)

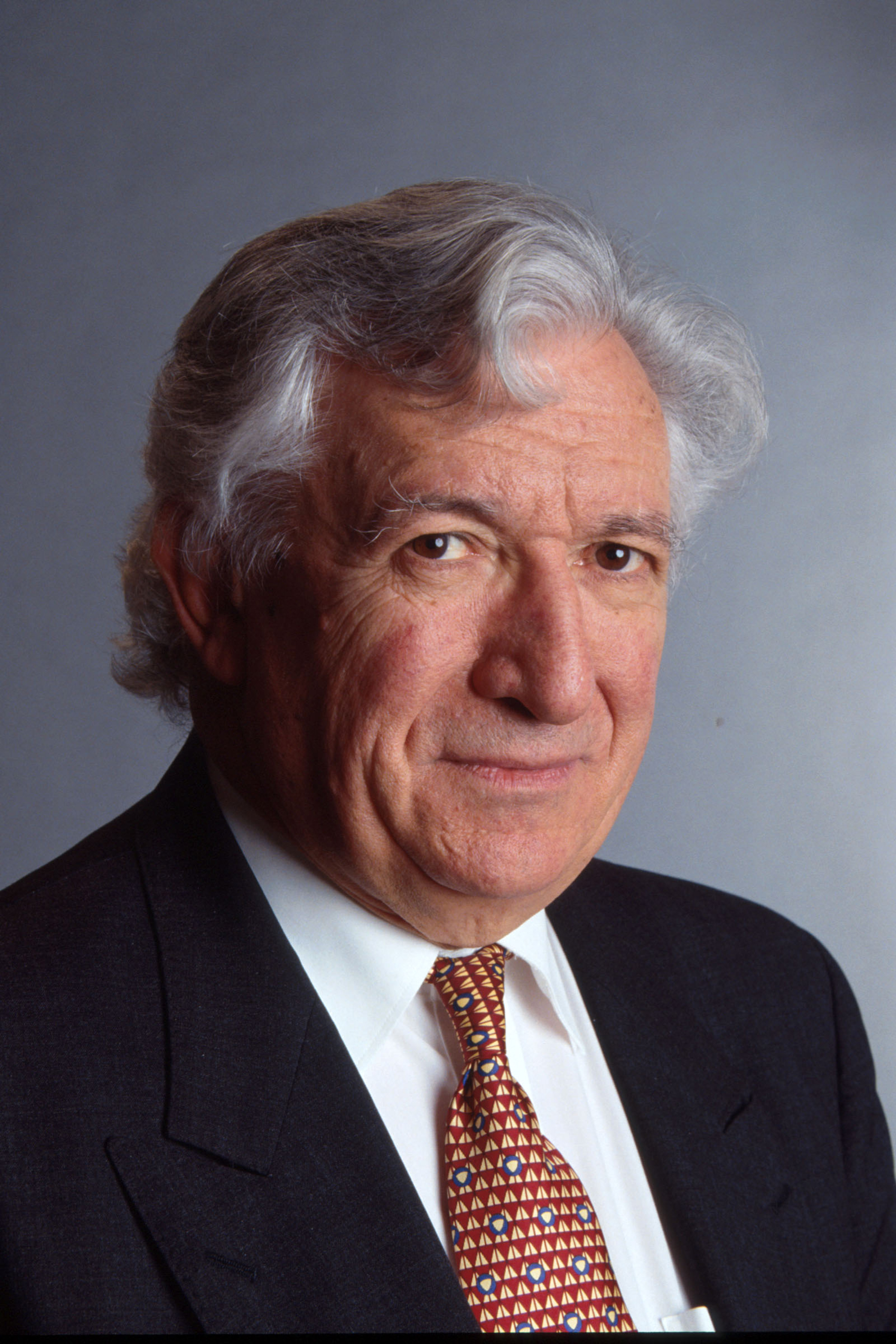

Member of the Swiss National Council
- In office 25 November 1991 – 30 November 2003

Member of the Grand Council of Neuchâtel
- In office 1977–1984

Personal details
- Born: 11 March 1934 Neuchâtel, Switzerland
- Died: 28 February 2026 (aged 91)
- Party: PLS
- Education: University of Neuchâtel (Lic.); École Nationale des Chartes
- Occupation: Academic

Rémy Scheurer (11 March 1934 – 28 February 2026) was a Swiss politician of the Swiss Liberal Party (PLS).

== Life and career ==
Born in Neuchâtel on 11 March 1934, Scheurer was the son of cabinetmaker Germain Scheurer and Charlotte Cuche. He earned a licentiate in letters from the University of Neuchâtel and subsequently attended the École Nationale des Chartes from 1958 to 1962. From 1962 to 1971, he taught secondary school in Neuchâtel and received a grant from the Swiss National Science Foundation. From 1968 to 1971, he was a lecturer of palaeography at the University of Neuchâtel. He was a full professor of medieval and Renaissance history from 1971 to 1999, and served as rector of the Faculty of Letters from 1987 to 1991. He served as president of the Société d'histoire et d'archéologie du canton de Neuchâtel and served on the Conseil national de la recherche scientifique from 1985 to 1996. He was a member of the scientific council of the journal Humanisme et renaissance and was also an associate member of the Société de l'histoire du protestantisme français.

Scheurer was president of the Canton of Neuchâtel chapter of the PLS from 1972 to 1976. He was a member of the communal council of Hauterive from 1968 to 2000. At the same time, he was a member of the Grand Council of Neuchâtel from 1977 to 1984. He served in the National Council from 1991 to 2003, leading the Liberal group in his final term. He served on the Science, Education and Culture Committee and the Assemblée parlementaire de la Francophonie. In 2003, he chose not to stand for re-election.

Scheurer died on 28 February 2026, at the age of 91.

== Publications ==
- Les finances du Comté de Neuchâtel à la fin du xvie siècle (1985)
- Pierre Chambrier, 1542 (?) - 1609. Aspects de la vie publique et privée d'un homme d'État neuchâtelois (1988)
- Correspondance du Cardinal Jean du Bellay . Volume 5, 1549-1550 (2012)
- Correspondance du Cardinal Jean du Bellay. Volume 6 1550-1555 (2015)
